= Boxing at the 1974 British Commonwealth Games =

- Venue: Canterbury Court
- Location: Christchurch, New Zealand
- Dates: 24 January to 2 February 1974

Boxing at the 1974 British Commonwealth Games was the tenth appearance of the Boxing at the Commonwealth Games. The events were held in Christchurch, New Zealand from 24 January to 2 February 1974 and featured contests in eleven weight classes.

The boxing events were held at Canterbury Court, a 4,700 seating capacity building owned by the Canterbury Manufacturer's Association.

England topped the boxing medal table by virtue of winning three gold medals.

== Medal table ==
* Host nation (New Zealand)

Medals won by nation with totals, ranked by number of golds—sortable
Rank	Nation	Gold	Silver	Bronze	Total
1	England	3	0	2	5
2	Uganda	2	3	2	7
3	Nigeria	2	2	2	6
4	Zambia	1	1	1	3
5	Kenya	1	0	3	4
6	Northern Ireland	1	0	2	3
7	Saint Vincent and the Grenadines	1	0	0	1
8	New Zealand*	0	1	3	4
8	Scotland	0	1	3	4
10	India	0	1	1	2
11	Ghana	0	1	0	1
11	Wales	0	1	0	1
13	Canada	0	0	1	1
13	Samoa	0	0	1	1
13	Singapore	0	0	1	1
Totals (15 entries)		11	11	22	44

== Medallists ==
Weight	Gold	Silver	Bronze
Light Flyweight	(Kenya) Stephen Muchoki	(Uganda) James Odwori	(Singapore) Syed Abdul Kadir (Scotland) John Bambrick
Flyweight	(Northern Ireland) Davy Larmour	(India) Chandra Narayanan	(Nigeria) Saliu Ishola (Uganda) John Byaruhanga
Bantamweight	(England) Patrick Cowdell	(Uganda) Ali Rojo	(Zambia) Newton Chisanga (Kenya) Isaac Maina
Featherweight	(Nigeria) Eddie Ndukwu	(Uganda) Shadrach Odhiambo	(Canada) Dale Anderson (Kenya) Samuel Mbugua
Lightweight	(Uganda) Ayub Kalule	(Nigeria) Kayin Amah	(India) Muniswamy Venu (New Zealand) Robert Colley
Light Welterweight	(Nigeria) Obisia Nwankpa	(Ghana) Joe Martey	(Kenya) Philip Mathenge (Scotland) Jim Douglas
Welterweight	(Uganda) Mohamed Muruli	(Wales) Errol McKenzie	(Northern Ireland) John Rodgers (Scotland) Steve Cooney
Light Middleweight	(Zambia) Lottie Mwale	(Scotland) Cy Harrison	(New Zealand) Lance Revill (England) Robbie Davies
Middleweight	(Saint Vincent and the Grenadines) Frankie Lucas	(Zambia) Julius Luipa	(England) Carl Speare (New Zealand) Les Rackley
Light Heavyweight	(England) Bill Knight	(New Zealand) William Byrne	(Northern Ireland) Gordon Ferris (Nigeria) Isaac Ikhouria
Heavyweight	(England) Neville Meade	(Nigeria) Fatai Ayinla	(Uganda) Benson Masanda (Samoa) Vai Samu

== Results ==
=== Light-flyweight under 48kg ===
Round	Winner	Loser	Score
Preliminary	(Scotland) John Bambrick	(India) Shivran Sutar	PTS
Preliminary	(England) Mickey Abrams	(Samoa) Elisaia Nania	PTS
Quarter-Final	(Uganda) James Odwori	(Tanzania) Bakari Seleman	KO 2
Quarter-Final	(Singapore) Syed Kadir	(Papua New Guinea) Jopha Yarawi	PTS
Quarter-Final	(Kenya) Stephen Muchoki	(Australia) Roger James Richens	PTS
Quarter-Final	(Scotland) John Bambrick	(England) Mickey Abrams	PTS
Semi-Final	(Uganda) James Odwori	(Singapore) Syed Kadir	PTS
Semi-Final	(Kenya) Stephen Muchoki	(Scotland) John Bambrick	PTS
Final	(Kenya) Stephen Muchoki	(Uganda) James Odwori	PTS

=== Flyweight 51kg ===
Round	Winner	Loser	Score
Preliminary	(India) Chandra Narayanan	(Papua New Guinea) Jack Eki	PTS
Preliminary	(Scotland) John Lawless	(England) Roy Hilton	RSC2
Preliminary	(Uganda) John Byaruhanga	(Wales) Bryn Griffiths	PTS
Preliminary	(Samoa) Elisaia Nanai	(Papua New Guinea) Willie Tarika	PTS
Preliminary	(Nigeria) Saliu Ishola	(Tanzania) Saidi Tambwe	PTS
Preliminary	(Ghana) Kulehu Kwao	(Australia) Thomas Mervyn Carney	PTS
Preliminary	(Northern Ireland) Davy Larmour	(Zambia) Timothy Feruka	PTS
Quarter-Final	(India) Chandra Narayanan	(Kenya) George Findo	PTS
Quarter-Final	(Uganda) John Byaruhanga	(Scotland) John Lawless	KO 2
Quarter-Final	(Nigeria) Saliu Ishola	(Samoa) Elisaia Nanai	PTS
Quarter-Final	(Northern Ireland) Davy Larmour	(Ghana) Kulehu Kwao	PTS
Semi-Final	(Northern Ireland) Davy Larmour	(Nigeria) Saliu Ishola	PTS
Semi-Final	(India) Chandra Narayanan	(Uganda) John Byaruhanga	PTS
Final	(Northern Ireland) Davy Larmour	(India) Chandra Narayanan	PTS

=== Bantamweight 54kg ===
Round	Winner	Loser	Score
Preliminary	(Nigeria) Chris Emenogu	(Papua New Guinea) John Kopi	RSC 3
Preliminary	(Zambia) Newton Chisanga	(Malawi) Kid Gondwe	PTS
Preliminary	(Samoa) Tuifagalilo Uiliata	(New Zealand) Warren Karaitiana	PTS
Preliminary	(Scotland) Stewart Ogilvie	(Australia) Joseph Donovan	PTS
Preliminary	(England) Patrick Cowdell	(Fiji) Jioji Robo	PTS
Quarter-Final	(Uganda) Ali Rojo	(Tanzania) Habibu Kinyogoli	PTS
Quarter-Final	(Kenya) Isaac Kuria Maina	(Nigeria) Chris Emenogu	PTS
Quarter-Final	(Zambia) Newton Chisanga	(Samoa) Tuifagalilo Uiliata	RSC 2
Quarter-Final	(England) Patrick Cowdell	(Scotland) Stewart Ogilvie	PTS
Semi-Final	(Uganda) Ali Rojo	(Kenya) Isaac Kuria Maina	PTS
Semi-Final	(England) Patrick Cowdell	(Zambia) Newton Chisanga	PTS
Final	(England) Patrick Cowdell	(Uganda) Ali Rojo	PTS

=== Featherweight 57kg ===
Round	Winner	Loser	Score
Preliminary	(Uganda) Shadrach Odhiambo	(Tonga) Sanipoi Naupoto	RSC2
Preliminary	(England) Colin Flinn	(Lesotho) Daniel Masia	PTS
Preliminary	(Northern Ireland) Gerard Hamill	(Papua New Guinea) Stephen Meta	PTS
Preliminary	(Tanzania) Jacob Mussa	(Singapore) Cyril Jeeris	PTS
Preliminary	(Canada) Dale Anderson	(Samoa) Pelema Kome	PTS
Preliminary	(Kenya) Samuel Mbugua	(New Zealand) Derek Wilson	RSC 2
Preliminary	(Nigeria) Eddie Ndukwu	(Australia) Kenneth Paterson	PTS
Quarter-Final	(Canada) Dale Anderson	(Wales) Chris Davies	PTS
Quarter-Final	(Uganda) Shadrach Odhiambo	(England) Colin Flinn	PTS
Quarter-Final	(Kenya) Samuel Mbugua	(Northern Ireland) Gerard Hamill	DQ 2
Quarter-Final	(Nigeria) Eddie Ndukwu	(Tanzania) Jacob Mussa	PTS
Semi-Final	(Nigeria) Eddie Ndukwu	(Kenya) Samuel Mbugua	PTS
Semi-Final	(Uganda) Shadrach Odhiambo	(Canada) Dale Anderson	PTS
Final	(Nigeria) Eddie Ndukwu	(Uganda) Shadrach Odhiambo	PTS

=== Lightweight 60kg ===
Round	Winner	Loser	Score
Preliminary	(Lesotho) Robert Moepi	(Papua New Guinea) Titi Christian	PTS
Preliminary	(Nigeria) Kayin Amah	(Samoa) Semi Pe'a	KO 3
Preliminary	(Kenya) George Oduori	(Scotland) John Gillan	PTS
Preliminary	(India) Muniswamy Venu	(Fiji) John Heritage	KO 3
Preliminary	(Uganda) Ayub Kalule	(Tanzania) William Lyimo	PTS
Preliminary	(Northern Ireland) Ray Heaney	(England) Des Gwilliam	PTS
Preliminary	(New Zealand) Robert Colley	(Cook Islands) Vaka Rima	PTS
Quarter-Final	(Nigeria) Kayin Amah	(Australia) David Sarago	KO 2
Quarter-Final	(India) Muniswamy Venu	(Kenya) George Oduori	W/O
Quarter-Final	(New Zealand) Robert Colley	(Lesotho) Robert Moepi	PTS
Quarter-Final	(Uganda) Ayub Kalule	(Northern Ireland) Ray Heaney	PTS
Semi-Final	(Uganda) Ayub Kalule	(New Zealand) Robert Colley	PTS
Semi-Final	(Nigeria) Kayin Amah	(India) Muniswamy Venu	PTS
Final	(Uganda) Ayub Kalule	(Nigeria) Kayin Amah	PTS

=== Light-welterweight 63.5kg ===
Round	Winner	Loser	Score
Extra Preliminary	(Uganda) Joseph Nsubuga	(Australia) Lindsay John Toole	PTS
Extra Preliminary	(Fiji) Sakiusa Vakacautadra	(Malawi) James Yesmya	PTS
Extra Preliminary	(Scotland) Jim Douglas	(Lesotho) Wyane Bennett	PTS
Preliminary	(England) Tommy Dunn	(Northern Ireland) David Campbell	PTS
Preliminary	(New Zealand) David Jackson	(Tonga) Matekihelia Lui	PTS
Preliminary	(Ghana) Joe Martey	(Lesotho) Mochochonono Mokhutloe	KO 1
Preliminary	(Kenya) Philip Mathenge	(Canada) Michel Briere	PTS
Preliminary	(Samoa) Uelese Pa'Upu'U	(Cook Islands) Emile Emile	RSC 1
Preliminary	(Nigeria) Obisia Nwankpa	(Tanzania) Robert Mwakosya	RSC 3
Preliminary	(Uganda) Joseph Nsubuga	(Papua New Guinea) Philip Sapak	RSC 1
Preliminary	(Scotland) Jim Douglas	(Fiji) Sakiusa Vakacautadra	PTS
Quarter-Final	(Kenya) Philip Mathenge	(England) Tommy Dunn	PTS
Quarter-Final	(Ghana) Joe Martey	(New Zealand) David Jackson	PTS
Quarter-Final	(Nigeria) Obisia Nwankpa	(Samoa) Uelese Pa'Upu'U	PTS
Quarter-Final	(Scotland) Jim Douglas	(Uganda) Joseph Nsubuga	PTS
Semi-Final	(Nigeria) Obisia Nwankpa	(Scotland) Jim Douglas	PTS
Semi-Final	(Ghana) Joe Martey	(Kenya) Philip Mathenge	PTS
Final	(Nigeria) Obisia Nwankpa	(Ghana) Joe Martey	PTS

=== Welterweight 67kg ===
Round	Winner	Loser	Score
Preliminary	(Uganda) Mohamed Muruli	(Kenya) Caleb Okech	PTS
Preliminary	(New Zealand) Ronald Jackson	(Samoa) Raymond Taefu	KO 2
Quarter-Final	(Northern Ireland) John Rodgers	(Australia) Robert Dauer	KO 1
Quarter-Final	(Wales) Errol McKenzie	(Ghana) Emma Ankudey	PTS
Quarter-Final	(Uganda) Mohamed Muruli	(Canada) Carmen Rinke	PTS
Quarter-Final	(Scotland) Steven Cooney	(New Zealand) Ronald Jackson	PTS
Semi-Final	(Uganda) Mohamed Muruli	(Scotland) Steven Cooney	PTS
Semi-Final	(Wales) Errol McKenzie	(Northern Ireland) John Rodgers	PTS
Final	(Uganda) Mohamed Muruli	(Wales) Errol McKenzie	PTS

=== Light-middleweight 71kg ===
Round	Winner	Loser	Score
Preliminary	(Samoa) Utifiu Vaili	(Canada) Michael Prevost	DQ 2
Preliminary	(New Zealand) Lance Revill	(Uganda) John Langol	RSC 2
Preliminary	(Scotland) Cy Harrison	(Ghana) Ricky Barnor	PTS
Preliminary	(Fiji) Siologologo Afamilioni	(Tonga) Solomone Namoa	RSC 3
Preliminary	(Zambia) Lottie Mwale	(Cook Islands) Nio Mare	KO 1
Preliminary	(Kenya) David Makumba	(Tanzania) Felix Massawe	PTS
Preliminary	(Wales) William Allen	(Papua New Guinea) Som Agum	PTS
Preliminary	(England) Robbie Davies	(Nigeria) Fidelis Olayiwola	RSC 1
Quarter-Final	(New Zealand) Lance Revill	(Samoa) Utifiu Vaili	PTS
Quarter-Final	(Scotland) Cy Harrison	(Fiji) Siologologo Afamilioni	RSC 3
Quarter-Final	(Zambia) Lottie Mwale	(Kenya) David Makumba	KO 1
Quarter-Final	(England) Robbie Davies	(Wales) William Allen	AB 3
Semi-Final	(Zambia) Lottie Mwale	(England) Robbie Davies	PTS
Semi-Final	(Scotland) Cy Harrison	(New Zealand) Lance Revill	PTS
Final	(Zambia) Lottie Mwale	(Scotland) Cy Harrison	PTS

=== Middleweight 75kg ===
Round	Winner	Loser	Score
Preliminary	(Zambia) Julius Luipa	(Fiji) Manueli Bese	RSC2
Preliminary	(Kenya) Simon Kent	(Papua New Guinea) Larry Dick	RSC3
Preliminary	(Nigeria) Kingsley Idami	(Lesotho) Daniel Mapanya	PTS
Preliminary	(Saint Vincent and the Grenadines) Frankie Lucas	(Samoa) Sefulu Tifaga	PTS
Preliminary	(England) Carl Speare	(Canada) Tim Taylor	PTS
Preliminary	(Tanzania) Titus Simba	(Australia) S Glover	PTS
Quarter-Final	(New Zealand) Les Rackley	(Uganda) Mustapha Wasajja	KO 1
Quarter-Final	(Zambia) Julius Luipa	(Tanzania) Titus Simba	AB 2
Quarter-Final	(England) Carl Speare	(Kenya) Simon Kent	PTS
Quarter-Final	(Saint Vincent and the Grenadines) Frankie Lucas	(Nigeria) Kingsley Idami	KO 1
Semi-Final	(Saint Vincent and the Grenadines) Frankie Lucas	(England) Carl Speare	PTS
Semi-Final	(Zambia) Julius Luipa	(New Zealand) Les Rackley	PTS
Final	(Saint Vincent and the Grenadines) Frankie Lucas	(Zambia) Julius Luipa	KO 2

=== Light-heavyweight 81kg ===
Round	Winner	Loser	Score
Preliminary	(Kenya) Peter Dula	(Tonga) Talete Moala	KO 2
Preliminary	(Nigeria) Isaac Ikhouria	(Uganda) Deo Grasis Zinkubire	PTS
Quarter-Final	(Nigeria) Isaac Ikhouria	(Kenya) Peter Dula	PTS
Quarter-Final	(Northern Ireland) Gordon Ferris	(Fiji) Salusalu Viavia	KO 2
Quarter-Final	(England) Bill Knight	(Samoa) Tolai Liuteine	PTS
Quarter-Final	(New Zealand) William Byrne	(Papua New Guinea) Paul Thompson	RSC 2
Semi-Final	(England) Bill Knight	(Northern Ireland) Gordon Ferris	RSC 3
Semi-Final	(New Zealand) William Byrne	(Nigeria) Isaac Ikhouria	PTS
Final	(England) Bill Knight	(New Zealand) William Byrne	W/O

=== Heavyweight +81kg ===
Round	Winner	Loser	Score
Preliminary	(New Zealand) Fisi Brown	(Kenya) Sylvester Onyango	PTS
Quarter-Final	(Uganda) Benson Masanda	(New Zealand) Fisi Brown	PTS
Quarter-Final	(Samoa) Vai Samu	(Tonga) Sione Pulu	PTS
Quarter-Final	(England) Neville Meade	(Canada) Caroll Morgan	PTS
Quarter-Final	(Nigeria) Fatai Ayinla	(Australia) Malcolm Ross Challenor	DQ 3
Semi-Final	(England) Neville Meade	(Samoa) Vai Samu	PTS
Semi-Final	(Nigeria) Fatai Ayinla	(Uganda) Benson Masanda	RSC 1
Final	(England) Neville Meade	(Nigeria) Fatai Ayinla	RSCI 1
