= Boxing at the 1970 British Commonwealth Games =

- Venue: Murrayfield Ice Rink
- Location: Edinburgh, Scotland
- Dates: 16 to 25 July 1970

Boxing at the 1970 British Commonwealth Games was the ninth appearance of the Boxing at the Commonwealth Games. The events were held in Edinburgh, Scotland, from 16 to 25 July 1970 and featured contests in eleven weight classes.

The boxing events were held at the Murrayfield Ice Rink

Uganda topped the boxing medal table by virtue of winning three gold medals.

== Medal table ==
* Host nation (Scotland)

Medals won by nation with totals, ranked by number of golds—sortable
Rank	Nation	Gold	Silver	Bronze	Total
1	Uganda	3	2	0	5
2	England	2	0	3	5
3	Ghana	2	0	2	4
4	Nigeria	2	0	0	2
5	Kenya	1	2	2	5
6	Scotland*	1	1	4	6
7	Wales	0	2	0	2
8	Northern Ireland	0	1	2	3
8	Zambia	0	1	2	3
10	Jamaica	0	1	0	1
10	Tanzania	0	1	0	1
12	Australia	0	0	2	2
13	Canada	0	0	1	1
13	Guyana	0	0	1	1
13	India	0	0	1	1
13	Malawi	0	0	1	1
13	Pakistan	0	0	1	1
Totals (17 entries)		11	11	22	44

== Medallists ==
Weight	Gold	Silver	Bronze
Light Flyweight	James Odwori (UGA)	Tony Davies (WAL)	Peter J. Butterfield (AUS); Mickey Abrams (ENG)
Flyweight	Dave Needham (ENG)	Leo Rwabwogo (UGA)	Alex McHugh (SCO); Davy Larmour (NIR)
Bantamweight	Sulley Shittu (GHA)	Samuel Mbugua (KEN)	Stewart Ogilvie (SCO); Courtney Atherly (GUY)
Featherweight	Philip Waruinge (KEN)	Deogratias Musoke (UGA)	Mir Samar (PAK); Alan Richardson (ENG)
Lightweight	Adeyemi Abayomi (NGR)	John Gillan (SCO)	Tatu Ghionga (MAW); Moses Mbogwa (KEN)
Light Welterweight	Mohamed Muruli (UGA)	Dai Davies (WAL)	Emmanuel Lawson (GHA); Paul Kayula (ZAM)
Welterweight	Emma Ankudey (GHA)	John Olulu (KEN)	Tommy Joyce (SCO); Shivaji Bhonsle (IND)
Light Middleweight	Tom Imrie (SCO)	Julius Luipa (ZAM)	Paddy Doherty (NIR); David Attan (KEN)
Middleweight	John Conteh (ENG)	Titus Simba (TAN)	Robert Murphy (AUS); Samuel Kasongo (ZAM)
Light Heavyweight	Fatai Ayinla (NGR)	Oliver Wright (JAM)	Victor Attivor (GHA); John Rafferty (SCO)
Heavyweight	Benson Masanda (UGA)	John McKinty (NIR)	Jack Meda (CAN); Les Stevens (ENG)

== Results ==
=== Light-flyweight under 48kg ===
Round	Winner	Loser	Score
Preliminary	(Australia) Peter Butterfield	(Malawi) Shekie Kongo	PTS
Preliminary	(Nigeria) Gabriel Ogun	(Kenya) Douglas Ogada	RSC 2
Quarter-Final	(Uganda) James Odwori	(Scotland) Tony Kerr	PTS
Quarter-Final	(England) Mickey Abrams	(Ghana) Hurana Bukari	PTS
Quarter-Final	(Wales) Tony Davies	(Zambia) B. Mazyopa	PTS
Quarter-Final	(Australia) Peter Butterfield	(Nigeria) Gabriel Ogun	PTS
Semi-Final	(Uganda) James Odwori	(England) Mickey Abrams	PTS
Semi-Final	(Wales) Tony Davies	(Australia) Peter Butterfield	PTS
Final	(Uganda) James Odwori	(Wales) Tony Davies	PTS

=== Flyweight 51kg ===
Round	Winner	Loser	Score
Preliminary	(England) Dave Needham	(Nigeria) Columba Durango	5:0
Preliminary	(Zambia) David Natta	(Pakistan) Jan Balouch	RSC 2
Preliminary	(Scotland) Alex McHugh	(Wales) Maurice O'Sullivan	KO 2
Preliminary	(Ghana) Joe Destimo	(Canada) Neil Austin	KO 1
Quarter-Final	(Northern Ireland) Davy Larmour	(Kenya) Isaac Kuria Maina	PTS
Quarter-Final	(Uganda) Leo Rwabwogo	(Australia) Leon Nissen	RSC 2
Quarter-Final	(England) Dave Needham	(Zambia) David Natta	3:2
Quarter-Final	(Scotland) Alex McHugh	(Ghana) Joe Destimo	PTS
Semi-Final	(Uganda) Leo Rwabwogo	(Northern Ireland) Davy Larmour	PTS
Semi-Final	(England) Dave Needham	(Scotland) Alex McHugh	PTS
Final	(England) Dave Needham	(Uganda) Leo Rwabwogo	4:1

=== Bantamweight 54kg ===
Round	Winner	Loser	Score
Preliminary	(Northern Ireland) Mickey Tohill	(Zambia) Arnold Katakala	PTS
Preliminary	(Guyana) Courtney Atherly	(Wales) Philip Davies	PTS
Preliminary	(Ghana) Sulley Shittu	(England) Tony Oxley	PTS
Preliminary	(Scotland) Stewart Ogilvie	(Pakistan) Ghulan Sarwar	PTS
Preliminary	(Nigeria) Eddie Ndukwu	(Malawi) C. Nguwo	PTS
Preliminary	(Canada) Joe Cooke	(Uganda) Eridadi Mukwanga	PTS
Quarter-Final	(Kenya) Samuel Mbugua	(Australia) Brian Everard	PTS
Quarter-Final	(Guyana) Courtney Atherly	(Northern Ireland) Mickey Tohill	KO 2
Quarter-Final	(Ghana) Sulley Shittu	(Nigeria) Eddie Ndukwu	PTS
Quarter-Final	(Scotland) Stewart Ogilvie	(Canada) Joe Cooke	RSC 1
Semi-Final	(Kenya) Samuel Mbugua	(Guyana) Courtney Atherly	RSC 2
Semi-Final	(Ghana) Sulley Shittu	(Scotland) Stewart Ogilvie	RSC 2
Final	(Ghana) Sulley Shittu	(Kenya) Samuel Mbugua	PTS

=== Featherweight 57kg ===
Round	Winner	Loser	Score
Preliminary	(England) Alan Richardson	(Jersey) Mauro Micheletti	RSC 1
Preliminary	(Scotland) Ian Cameron	(Canada) Frank Scott	PTS
Preliminary	(Nigeria) Kayin Amah	(Northern Ireland) Gerald Jordan	PTS
Preliminary	(Kenya) Philip Waruinge	(Zambia) Godfrey Mwamba	KO 1
Preliminary	(Uganda) Deogratias Musoke	(Tanzania) G. Marisa	RSC 2
Preliminary	(Wales) Eddie Pritchard	(Malawi) John Bakayao	RSC 1
Preliminary	(New Zealand) Brian Kendall	(Papua New Guinea) Phillip Yang	PTS
Preliminary	(Pakistan) Samad Mir	(Ghana) S. Akushe	PTS
Quarter-Final	(England) Alan Richardson	(Scotland) Ian Cameron	4:1
Quarter-Final	(Uganda) Deogratias Musoke	(Wales) Eddie Pritchard	PTS
Quarter-Final	(Kenya) Philip Waruinge	(Nigeria) Kayin Amah	PTS
Quarter-Final	(Pakistan) Samad Mir	(New Zealand) Brian Kendall	PTS
Semi-Final	(Kenya) Philip Waruinge	(England) Alan Richardson	PTS
Semi-Final	(Uganda) Deogratias Musoke	(Pakistan) Samad Mir	WO
Final	(Kenya) Philip Waruinge	(Uganda) Deogratias Musoke	PTS

=== Lightweight 60kg ===
Round	Winner	Loser	Score
Preliminary	(Zambia) Kenneth Mwansa	(Uganda) Joseph Nsubuga	PTS
Preliminary	(Nigeria) Adeyemi Abayomi	(Tanzania) Habibu Kinyogoli	PTS
Preliminary	(Ghana) Joe Martey	(England) Howard Hayes	PTS
Preliminary	(Kenya) Moses Kamau Mbogwa	(Jamaica) Errol West	4:1
Preliminary	(Malawi) Tatu Chionga	(Australia) Roger Bowyer	RSC 2
Preliminary	(Wales) Marin Phillips	(Papua New Guinea) Stephan Sapan	RSC 3
Preliminary	(Scotland) John Gillan	(India) Muniswamy Venu	PTS
Preliminary	(Northern Ireland) Paul Carson	(Canada) Marvin Arneson	RSC 2
Quarter-Final	(Nigeria) Adeyemi Abayomi	(Zambia) Kenneth Mwansa	PTS
Quarter-Final	(Kenya) Moses Kamau Mbogwa	(Ghana) Joe Martey	PTS
Quarter-Final	(Malawi) Tatu Chionga	(Wales) Marin Phillips	RSC 3
Quarter-Final	(Scotland) John Gillan	(Northern Ireland) Paul Carson	PTS
Semi-Final	(Nigeria) Adeyemi Abayomi	(Kenya) Moses Kamau Mbogwa	PTS
Semi-Final	(Scotland) John Gillan	(Malawi) Tatu Chionga	PTS
Final	(Nigeria) Abayomi Adeyemi	(Scotland) John Gillan	PTS

=== Light-welterweight 63.5kg ===
Round	Winner	Loser	Score
Preliminary	(Wales) Dai Davies	(Kenya) Stephen Baraza	PTS
Preliminary	(Nigeria) Anthony Andeh	(Scotland) Peter Harrison	KO 1
Preliminary	(Zambia) Paul Mulenga Kayula	(England) Ron Thurston	PTS
Preliminary	(Bermuda) Roy Johnson	(Canada) Fred Fuller	4:1
Quarter-Final	(Ghana) Odartey Lawson	(Pakistan) M. Siddique	PTS
Quarter-Final	(Uganda) Mohamed Muruli	(Guyana) Reggie Ford	PTS
Quarter-Final	(Wales) Dai Davies	(Nigeria) Anthony Andeh	3:2
Quarter-Final	(Zambia) Paul Mulenga Kayula	(Bermuda) Roy Johnson	PTS
Semi-Final	(Uganda) Mohamed Muruli	(Ghana) Odartey Lawson	RSC 1
Semi-Final	(Wales) Dai Davies	(Zambia) Paul Mulenga Kayula	PTS
Final	(Uganda) Mohamed Muruli	(Wales) Dai Davies	3:2

=== Welterweight 67kg ===
Round	Winner	Loser	Score
Preliminary	(Nigeria) Joe Mensah	(Papua New Guinea) B. Kodang	RSC 3
Preliminary	(Kenya) John Olulu	(New Zealand) Ali Afakasi	PTS
Preliminary	(Scotland) Tommy Joyce	(Wales) Mike McCluskie	PTS
Preliminary	(England) Terry Waller	(Northern Ireland) John Rodgers	PTS
Preliminary	(Ghana) Emma Ankudey	(Tanzania) N. Mhindi	RSC 3
Preliminary	(Uganda) Andrew Kajjo	(Zambia) Hugo Chansa	PTS
Quarter-Final	(India) Shivaji Bhonsle	(Canada) Paride Baldassare	PTS
Quarter-Final	(Kenya) John Olulu	(Nigeria) Joe Mensah	PTS
Quarter-Final	(Ghana) Emma Ankudey	(Uganda) Andrew Kajjo	PTS
Quarter-Final	(Scotland) Tommy Joyce	(England) Terry Waller	PTS
Semi-Final	(Kenya) John Olulu	(India) Shivaji Bhonsle	PTS
Semi-Final	(Ghana) Emma Ankudey	(Scotland) Tommy Joyce	RSC 1
Final	(Ghana) Emma Ankudey	(Kenya) John Olulu	PTS

=== Light-middleweight 71kg ===
Round	Winner	Loser	Score
Preliminary	(England) Dave Simmonds	(Mauritius) Gaetane Jubeau	KO 1
Preliminary	(Kenya) David Attan	(Nigeria) F. Oviawe	KO 2
Quarter-Final	(Scotland) Tom Imrie	(Uganda) David Jackson	RSC 1
Quarter-Final	(Northern Ireland) Paddy Doherty	(Ghana) Prince Amartey	PTS
Quarter-Final	(Zambia) Julius Luipa	(Wales) Peter Lloyd	KO 3
Quarter-Final	(Kenya) David Attan	(England) Dave Simmonds	PTS
Semi-Final	(Scotland) Tom Imrie	(Northern Ireland) Paddy Doherty	RSC 2
Semi-Final	(Zambia) Julius Luipa	(Kenya) David Attan	PTS
Final	(Scotland) Tom Imrie	(Zambia) Julius Luipa	3:2

=== Middleweight 75kg ===
Round	Winner	Loser	Score
Preliminary	(Tanzania) Titus Simba	(Scotland) Mike Imrie	KO 1
Preliminary	(England) John Conteh	(Bermuda) C. Simmons	KO 1
Preliminary	(Zambia) Samuel Kasongo	(Northern Ireland) Frank McCormick	RSC 2
Preliminary	(Pakistan) Arif Malik	(Ghana) Joe Darkey	PTS
Preliminary	(Uganda) John Opio	(Wales) Billie May	PTS
Quarter-Final	(Australia) Robert Murphy	(Nigeria) Isaac Ikhouria	PTS
Quarter-Final	(Tanzania) Titus Simba	(Kenya) S. Matianyi	PTS
Quarter-Final	(England) John Conteh	(Pakistan) Arif Malik	PTS
Quarter-Final	(Zambia) Samuel Kasongo	(Uganda) John Opio	RSC 3
Semi-Final	(Tanzania) Titus Simba	(Australia) Robert Murphy	RSC 1
Semi-Final	(England) John Conteh	(Zambia) Samuel Kasongo	PTS
Final	(England) John Conteh	(Tanzania) Titus Simba	4:1

=== Light-heavyweight 81kg ===
Round	Winner	Loser	Score
Preliminary	(Ghana) Victor Attivor	(Canada) Darryl Olsen	PTS
Preliminary	(England) Johnny Banham	(Uganda) Matthias Ouma	DQ 2
Preliminary	(Nigeria) Fatai Ayinla	(Jersey) Peter Parker	RSC 2
Preliminary	(Northern Ireland) Robert Espie	(Kenya) Stephen Thega	RSC 1
Quarter-Final	(Jamaica) Oliver Wright	(Papua New Guinea) Danny Ottley	RSC 1
Quarter-Final	(Scotland) John Rafferty	(Wales) Anthony Roberts	PTS
Quarter-Final	(Ghana) Victor Attivor	(England) Johnny Banham	PTS
Quarter-Final	(Nigeria) Fatai Ayinla	(Northern Ireland) Robert Espie	RSC 3
Semi-Final	(Jamaica) Oliver Wright	(Scotland) John Rafferty	KO 1
Semi-Final	(Nigeria) Fatai Ayinla	(Ghana) Victor Attivor	DQ 3
Final	(Nigeria) Fatai Ayinla	(Jamaica) Oliver Wright	PTS

=== Heavyweight 91kg ===
Round	Winner	Loser	Score
Quarter-Final	(Canada) Jack Meda	(Ghana) Adonis Ray	PTS
Quarter-Final	(Northern Ireland) John McKinty	(Nigeria) Ngozika Ekwelum	PTS
Quarter-Final	(England) Les Stevens	(Scotland) Jim Gilmour	PTS
Semi-Final	(Uganda) Benson Masanda	(Canada) Jack Meda	DQ 2
Semi-Final	(Northern Ireland) John McKinty	(England) Les Stevens	4:1
Final	(Uganda) Benson Masanda	(Northern Ireland) John McKinty	PTS
