= Boxing at the 1972 Summer Olympics – Light flyweight =

Olympic boxing tournament

Light flyweight boxing at the Games of the XX Olympiad
- Venue: Boxing Hall, Munich
- Dates: 28 August – 10 September 1972
- Competitors: 31 from 31 nations

Medalists
| 1st place, gold medalist(s) | | György Gedó | Hungary |
| 2nd place, silver medalist(s) | | Kim U-gil | North Korea |
| 3rd place, bronze medalist(s) | | Ralph Evans | Great Britain |
| 3rd place, bronze medalist(s) | | Enrique Rodríguez | Spain |

The men's light flyweight event was part of the boxing programme at the 1972 Summer Olympics. The weight class was the lightest contested, and allowed boxers of up to 48 kilograms to compete. The competition was held from 28 August to 10 September 1972. 31 boxers from 31 nations competed.

== Medalists ==
| Gold | György Gedó; Hungary |
| Silver | Kim U-gil; North Korea |
| Bronze | Ralph Evans; Great Britain |
| Bronze | Enrique Rodríguez; Spain |

== Results ==
The following boxers took part in the event:

| Rank | Name | Country |
|---|---|---|
| 1 | György Gedó | Hungary |
| 2 | Kim U-gil | North Korea |
| 3T | Ralph Evans | Great Britain |
| 3T | Enrique Rodríguez | Spain |
| 5T | Chanyalew Haile | Ethiopia |
| 5T | Volodymyr Ivanov | Soviet Union |
| 5T | James Odwori | Uganda |
| 5T | Rafael Carbonell | Cuba |
| 9T | Shekie Kongo | Malawi |
| 9T | Héctor Velásquez | Chile |
| 9T | Asen Nikolov | Bulgaria |
| 9T | Dennis Talbot | Australia |
| 9T | Said Ahmed El-Ashry | Egypt |
| 9T | Lee Seog-un | South Korea |
| 9T | Davey Armstrong | United States |
| 9T | Syed Abdul Kadir | Singapore |
| 17T | Timothy Feruka | Zambia |
| 17T | Vanduin Batbayar | Mongolia |
| 17T | Salvador García | Mexico |
| 17T | Yoshimitsu Aragaki | Japan |
| 17T | Carlos Leyes | Argentina |
| 17T | Surapong Sripirom | Thailand |
| 17T | Francisco Rodríguez | Venezuela |
| 17T | Meriga Salou Seriki | Dahomey |
| 17T | Vicente Arsenal | Philippines |
| 17T | Bakari Seleman | Tanzania |
| 17T | Roman Rożek | Poland |
| 17T | Arif Doğru | Turkey |
| 17T | Alexandru Turei | Romania |
| 17T | Prudencio Cardona | Colombia |
| 17T | Gaetano Curcetti | Italy |

=== First round ===
- Chanyalev Haile (ETH) def. Timothy Feruka (ZAM), KO-1
- Héctor Velasquez (CHL) def. Vandui Batbayar (MGL), 5:0
- Ralph Evans (GBR) def. Salvador García (MEX), 4:1
- Asen Nikolov (BUL) def. Yoshimitsu Aragaki (JPN), 5:0
- Vladimir Ivanov (URS) def. Carlos Leyes (ARG), 5:0
- György Gedó (HUN) def. Sripirom Surapong (THA), TKO-3
- Dennis Talbot (AUS) def. Francisco Rodríguez (VEN), KO-2
- Said Ahmed El-Ashry (EGY) def. Meriga Salou Seriki (DAH), 5:0
- James Odwori (UGA) def. Vicente Arsenal (PHI), TKO-2
- Kim U-Gil (PRK) def. Bakari Selemani (TNZ), TKO-1
- Lee Suk-Un (KOR) def. Roman Rozek (POL), 5:0
- Davey Armstrong (USA) def. Arif Dorgu (TUR), 4:1
- Enrique Rodriguez (ESP) def. Alexandru Turei (ROU), 3:2
- Rafael Carbonell (CUB) def. Prudencio Cardona (COL), 5:0
- Kadir Syed Abdul (SIN) def. Gaetano Curcetti (ITA), TKO-3

=== Second round ===
- Chanyalev Haile (ETH) def. Shekie Kongo (MAW), TKO-2
- Ralph Evans (GBR) def. Héctor Velasquez (CHL), 5:0
- Vladimir Ivanov (URS) def. Asen Nikolov (BUL), 5:0
- György Gedó (HUN) def. Dennis Talbot (AUS), 5:0
- James Odwori (UGA) def. Said Ahmed El-Ashry (EGY), TKO-2
- Kim U-Gil (PRK) def. Lee Suk-Un (KOR), 4:1
- Enrique Rodríguez (ESP) def. Davey Armstrong (USA), 5:0
- Rafael Carbonell (CUB) def. Kadir Syed Abdul (SIN), TKO-2

=== Quarterfinals ===
- Ralph Evans (GBR) def. Chanyalev Haile (ETH), 5:0
- György Gedó (HUN) def. Vladimir Ivanov (URS), 3:2
- Kim U-Gil (PRK) def. James Odwori (UGA), KO-2
- Enrique Rodríguez (ESP) def. Rafael Carbonell (CUB), 4:1

=== Semifinals ===
- György Gedó (HUN) def. Ralph Evans (GBR), 5:0
- Kim U-Gil (PRK) def. Enrique Rodríguez (ESP), 3:2

=== Final ===
- György Gedó (HUN) def. Kim U-Gil (PRK), 5:0
