= Boxing at the 1972 Summer Olympics – Light welterweight =

Olympic boxing tournament

Light welterweight boxing at the Games of the XX Olympiad
- Venue: Boxing Hall, Munich
- Dates: 30 August – 10 September 1972
- Competitors: 32 from 32 nations

Medalists
1st place, gold medalist(s)		Ray Seales	United States
2nd place, silver medalist(s)		Angel Angelov	Bulgaria
3rd place, bronze medalist(s)		Issake Dabore	Niger
3rd place, bronze medalist(s)		Zvonimir Vujin	Yugoslavia

The men's light welterweight event was part of the boxing programme at the 1972 Summer Olympics. The weight class allowed boxers of up to 63.5 kilograms to compete. The competition was held from 30 August to 10 September 1972. 32 boxers from 32 nations competed.

== Medalists ==
Gold	Ray Seales; United States
Silver	Angel Angelov; Bulgaria
Bronze	Issake Dabore; Niger
Bronze	Zvonimir Vujin; Yugoslavia

== Results ==
The following boxers took part in the event:

Rank	Name	Country
1	Ray Seales	United States
2	Angel Angelov	Bulgaria
3T	Issake Dabore	Niger
3T	Zvonimir Vujin	Yugoslavia
5T	Andrés Molina	Cuba
5T	Graham Moughton	Great Britain
5T	Bantow Srisook	Thailand
5T	Kyoji Shinohara	Japan
9T	Jim Montague	Ireland
9T	Anatoly Kamnev	Soviet Union
9T	Emilio Villa	Colombia
9T	Sodnomyn Gombo	Mongolia
9T	Walter Gómez	Argentina
9T	Calistrat Cuțov	Romania
9T	Park Tae-sik	South Korea
9T	Laudiel Negrón	Puerto Rico
17T	Nosra Vakil Monfard	Iran
17T	Ulrich Beyer	East Germany
17T	Roy Johnson	Bermuda
17T	Pentti Saarman	Finland
17T	Timsah Okalo Mulwal	Sudan
17T	Malang Balouch	Pakistan
17T	Robert Mwakosya	Tanzania
17T	Yotham Kunda	Zambia
17T	Luis Contreras	Venezuela
17T	Krzysztof Pierwieniecki	Poland
17T	Ernesto Bergamasco	Italy
17T	Mohamed Muruli	Uganda
17T	Abdou Fall	Senegal
17T	Emmanuel Lawson	Ghana
17T	Obisia Nwakpa	Nigeria
17T	Fekrou Gabreselassie	Ethiopia

=== First round ===
- James Montague (IRL) def. Nosrat Vakil Monfared (IRI), TKO-3
- Ray Seales (USA) def. Ulrich Beyer (GDR), 3:2
- Anatoliy Kamnev (URS) def. Roy Johnson (BER), KO-2
- Andres Molina (CUB) def. Pentti Saarman (FIN), TKO-2
- Emiliano Villa (COL) def. Timsah Milwal Okalo (SUD), 5:0
- Graham Moughton (GBR) def. Malang Balouch (PAK), 5:0
- Zvonimir Vujin (YUG) def. Robert Mwakosya (TNZ), TKO-2
- Sodnomyn Gombo (MGL) def. Ytham Kunda (ZAM), 5:0
- Angel Angelov (BUL) def. Luis Contreras (VEN), TKO-3
- Walter Desiderio Gomez (ARG) def. Krzysztof Pierwieniecki (POL), 5:0
- Srisook Buntoe (THA) def. Ernesto Bergamasco (ITA), 4:1
- Calistrat Cuțov (ROU) def. Mohamed Muruli (UGA), 4:1
- Park Tai-Shik (KOR) def. Abdou Fall (SEN), TKO-3
- Issaka Dabore (NIG) def. Odartey Lawson (GHA), TKO-3
- Laudiel Negron (PUR) def. Obisia Nwakpa (NGR), 4:1
- Kyoji Shinohara (JPN) def. Fekadu Gabre Selassie (ETH), 5:0

=== Second round ===
- Ray Seales (USA) def. James Montague (IRL), 5:0
- Andres Molina (CUB) def. Anatoliy Kamnev (URS), KO-3
- Graham Moughton (GBR) def. Emiliano Villa (COL), 3:2
- Zvonimir Vujin (YUG) def. Sodnomyn Gombo (MGL), 3:2
- Angel Angelov (BUL) def. Walter Desiderio Gomez (ARG), 4:1
- Srisook Buntoe (THA) def. Calistrat Cuțov (ROU), TKO-3
- Issaka Dabore (NIG) def. Park Tai-Shik (KOR), TKO-3
- Kyoji Shinohara (JPN) def. Laudiel Negron (PUR), 5:0

=== Quarterfinals ===
- Ray Seales (USA) def. Andres Molina (CUB), 3:2
- Zvonimir Vujin (YUG) def. Graham Moughton (GBR), 5:0
- Angel Angelov (BUL) def. Srisook Bantow (THA), TKO-2
- Issaka Dabore (NIG) def. Kyoji Shinohara (JPN), 3:2

=== Semifinals ===
- Ray Seales (USA) def. Zvonimir Vujin (YUG), 5:0
- Angel Angelov (BUL) def. Issaka Dabore (NIG), 5:0

=== Final ===
- Ray Seales (USA) def. Angel Angelov (BUL), 3:2
