= Ralph Evans (boxer) =

Wales boxer (born 1953)

Medal record

Men's Boxing

Representing Great Britain

Olympic Games
Bronze medal – third place	1972 Munich	Light flyweight

Ralph Evans (born 20 December 1953) is a Welsh former boxer. He represented Great Britain at the 1972 Summer Olympics in Munich, reaching the semi-final before losing to György Gedó. He received the bronze medal for the event, becoming the first Welsh boxer to win an Olympic medal. His performance was also the best finish by a Welsh boxer at an Olympic games for 40 years until it was surpassed in 2012.

He chose to retire after the tournament, becoming a coach for his brother Wayne during his professional boxing career.

== Early life ==
Ralph Evans was one of six children born in Tonypandy, South Wales, to parents Gwynfor and Jean Evans (née Powell). The family lived in Rosehill Terrace in Gilfach Goch until Evans was seven before moving to Waterlooville, Hampshire, near Portsmouth.

== Career ==
Evans' father was a former youth and miners' boxing champion and his uncle Gordon had owned Tonypandy Boxing Club. Evans' younger brother Wayne had also taken up the sport but Ralph preferred racing pigeons in his early teens. However, when his father later founded and ran the Waterlooville Amateur Boxing Club in the town, Ralph began to take an interest in the sport. In his first year as an amateur, Evans fought 27 times and reached the British Schools' final but was disqualified when the referee deemed a punch that floored his opponent was a low blow.

In his second year, Evans met Patrick Cowdell in the National Association of Boy's Clubs' final but suffered a close points defeat. The prize for winning the tournament was a training scholarship with heavyweight Joe Bugner in Norway. However, Evans' defeat to Cowdell was deemed so close that he was also offered a place. During the scholarship, Evans lived with Bugner's mother. On his return to Britain, Evans became the first Welsh Amateur Boxing Association (ABA) champion of the newly created light flyweight division. He went on to reach the British final at the age of 17 but suffered a defeat to Englishman Mickey Abrams in May 1971.

Evans was chosen to represent Wales at the 1971 European Amateur Boxing Championships in Madrid. He met Italian Franco Udella, losing a controversial split 3–2 decision despite knocking down his opponent five times during the bout. Disgruntled spectators ripped up seats and threw them into the ring in protest at the decision which delayed the event for several hours.

=== 1972 Summer Olympics ===
Evans met Abrams again in an eliminator for a place at the 1972 Summer Olympics in Munich. Evans avenged his previous defeat by winning on points at the Double Diamond Club in Caerphilly but the victory proved unpopular with some authorities who had lined up Abrams as the captain of the British Boxing team at the event. A rematch was ordered only for Evans to win again, this time after Abrams suffered a cut over his eye. In the first round at the Olympics, Evans was drawn against 18-yeat old Mexican Salvador Garcia. His opponent arrived late for the bout, so much so that Evans briefly sat in the crowd conversing with spectators. Facing a fellow southpaw for the first in his career, Evans emerged victorious with a 4–1 points victory.

Evans dominated Chilean Héctor Velásquez in the second round, claiming a 5–0 points victory in a performance that was described as "the purest boxing exhibition of the tournament." He repeated the feat in the quarter-final by defeating Chanyalew Haile of Ethiopia, including scoring a knockdown of his opponent in the first round. His victories earned him a semi-final fight against Hungarian György Gedó. Evans was defeated by Gedó who proved too strong for the Welshman, opening a cut in Evans' mouth during the bout. Despite his defeat, Evans secured a bronze medal for Britain, becoming the first Welshman to win an Olympic medal in boxing. His performance remained the best finish by a Welsh boxer at the Olympics for 40 years, until the 2012 Summer Olympics where Fred Evans won a silver medal.

== Later life ==
Despite being described as possessing "a most promising future" by The Guardian in the immediate aftermath of his Olympic defeat, Evans chose to retire from boxing soon after the tournament at the age of 19. He fought only once more, stepping in at late notice when a fighter pulled out of an event organised by his father's boxing club. Evans later worked at the club, coaching his younger brother Wayne during his professional career which culminated in a British bantamweight title defeat to Johnny Owen in 1978.
