= Kyōji =

- Gender: Male

Origin
- Origin: Japanese
- Meaning: Different meanings depending on the kanji used

Kyōji (written: 恭司, 恭二, 恭士 or 喬二, and alternatively romanised as Kyoji, Kyouji or Kyozi) is a masculine Japanese given name. Notable people with the name include:

- Kyoji Horiguchi (堀口 恭司; born 1990), Japanese mixed martial artist
- Kyozi Kawasaki (川崎 恭治; 1930–2021), Japanese physicist
- Kyoji Komachi (小町 恭士; born 1946), Japanese diplomat
- Kyoji Kutsuna (忽那 喬司; born 1997), Japanese footballer
- Kyoji Saito (齋藤 恭司; born 1944), Japanese mathematician
- Kyoji Shinohara (篠原 恭二; born 1949), Japanese boxer
- Kyoji Suga (菅 恭司; born 1969), Japanese biathlete
- Kyoji Tan (丹 喬二; 1937–2011), Japanese historian
- Kyoji Tominaga (富永 恭次; 1892–1960), Japanese officer in the Imperial Japanese Army
- Kyōji Watanabe (渡辺 京二; 1930–2022), Japanese historian, literary critic and essayist
- Kyoji Yamamoto (山本 恭司; born 1956), Japanese musician, singer-songwriter and record producer
- Kyoji Yamawaki (山脇 恭二; born 1957), Japanese gymnast

== Fictional characters ==
- Kyōji Itan (伊丹 キョウジ), an antagonist in the anime series Little Battlers Experience WARS
- Kyoji Kash, a character in the anime series Mobile Fighter G Gundam
- Kyōji Shinkawa (新川 恭二) a character in the light novel series Sword Art Online
