= Uganda at the Commonwealth Games =

- CGF code: UGA
- CGA: Commonwealth Games Association Uganda
- Website: nocuganda.org
- Medals Ranked 18th: Gold 19 Silver 16 Bronze 23 Total 58

Commonwealth Games appearances (overview)
- 1954; 1958; 1962; 1966; 1970; 1974; 1978; 1982; 1986; 1990; 1994; 1998; 2002; 2006; 2010; 2014; 2018; 2022; 2026; 2030

Uganda has competed in fifteen Commonwealth Games, from 1954.

== Medallists ==
=== List of medallists ===
Medal	Name	Games	Sport	Event
Gold	George Oywello	1962 Perth	Boxing	Heavyweight
Gold	James Odwori	1970 Edinburgh	Boxing	Light Flyweight
Gold	Mohamed Muruli	1970 Edinburgh	Boxing	Light Welterweight
Gold	Benson Masanda	1970 Edinburgh	Boxing	Heavyweight
Gold	Mohamed Muruli	1974 Christchurch	Boxing	Welterweight
Gold	Ayub Kalule	1974 Christchurch	Boxing	Lightweight
Gold	Justin Juuko	1990 Auckland	Boxing	Light Flyweight (– 48 kg)
Gold	Godfrey Nyakana	1990 Auckland	Boxing	Lightweight (– 60 kg)
Gold	Dorcus Inzikuru	2006 Melbourne	Athletics	3000m Steeplechase
Gold	Boniface Kiprop	2006 Melbourne	Athletics	10,000 metres
Gold	Moses Ndiema Kipsiro	2010 Delhi	Athletics	5,000 metres
Gold	Moses Ndiema Kipsiro	2010 Delhi	Athletics	10,000 metres
Gold	Moses Ndiema Kipsiro	2014 Glasgow	Athletics	10,000 metres
Silver	Patrick Etolu	1954 Vancouver	Athletics	High Jump
Silver	Thomas Kawere	1958 Cardiff	Boxing	Welterweight
Silver	Kesi Odongo	1962 Perth	Boxing	Lightweight
Silver	Leo Rwabwogo	1970 Edinburgh	Boxing	Flyweight
Silver	Deogratias Musoke	1970 Edinburgh	Boxing	Featherweight
Silver	William Koskei	1970 Edinburgh	Athletics	400 metres hurdles
Silver	Silver Ayoo	1974 Christchurch	Athletics	400 metres
Silver	James Odwori	1974 Christchurch	Boxing	Light Flyweight
Silver	Ali Rojo	1974 Christchurch	Boxing	Bantamweight
Silver	Shadrack Odhiambo	1974 Christchurch	Boxing	Featherweight
Silver	Ruth Kyalisima	1982 Brisbane	Athletics	400m Hurdles
Silver	Peter Rwamuhanda	1982 Brisbane	Athletics	400m Hurdles
Silver	Victor Byarugaba	1982 Brisbane	Boxing	Light Middleweight
Silver	Joseph Lubega	2002 Manchester	Boxing	Light Heavyweight
Silver	Mohamed Kayongo	2002 Manchester	Boxing	Light Welterweight

== Overall medal tally ==
With 39 medals, Uganda ranked eighteenth as of 2008 in the all-time tally of medals.

Games	Gold	Silver	Bronze	Total
1954 Vancouver	0	1	0	1
1958 Cardiff	0	1	0	1
1962 Perth	1	1	4	6
1966 Kingston	0	0	1	1
1970 Edinburgh	3	3	1	7
1974 Christchurch	2	4	3	9
1982 Brisbane	0	3	0	3
1990 Auckland	2	0	2	4
1994 Victoria	0	0	2	2
1998 Kuala Lumpur	0	0	1	1
2002 Manchester	0	2	0	2
2006 Melbourne	2	0	1	3
2010 Delhi	2	0	0	2
2014 Glasgow	1	0	4	5
2018 Gold Coast	3	1	2	6
2022 Birmingham	3	0	2	5
Totals (16 entries)	19	16	23	58
