= György Gedó =

Hungarian boxer (born 1949)

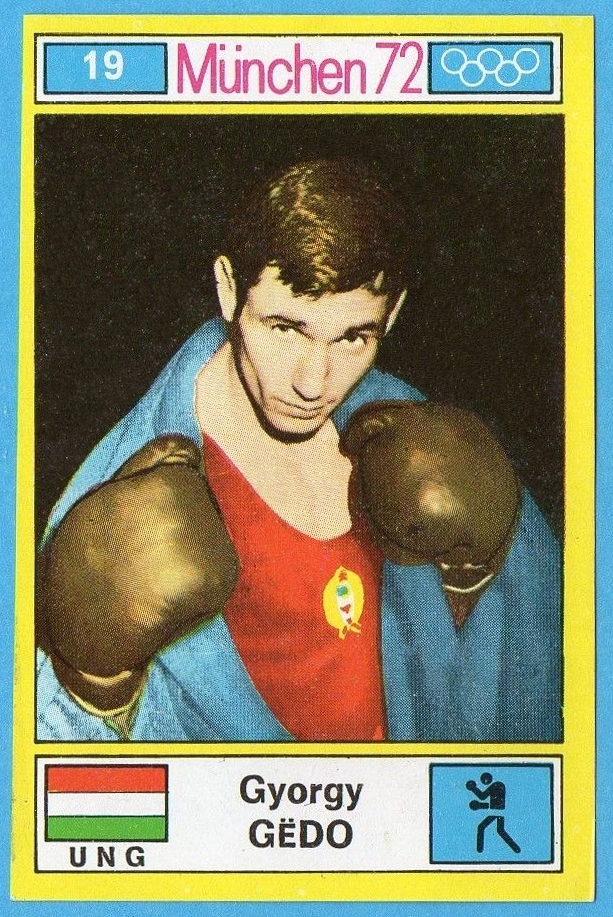

Personal information
- Born: 23 April 1949 (age 77) Újpest, Hungary
- Height: 162 cm (5 ft 4 in)

Sport
- Sport: Boxing
- Club: Vasas, Budapest
Medal record
Representing Hungary
Olympic Games
Gold medal – first place	1972 Munich	-48 kg
European Amateur Championships
Gold medal – first place	1969 Bucharest	-48 kg
Gold medal – first place	1971 Madrid	-48 kg
Bronze medal – third place	1975 Katowice	-48 kg

György Gedó (born 23 April 1949) is a retired Hungarian light-flyweight boxer. He competed in the 1968, 1972, 1976 and 1980 Olympics and won a gold medal in 1972. He was the European light-flyweight champion in 1969 and 1971. Gedó is Jewish.

== 1972 Olympic record ==
Below are the results of György Gedó, a Hungarian light flyweight boxer who competed at the 1972 Munich Olympics:

- Round of 32: defeated Surapong Sripirom (Thailand) by a third-round technical knockout
- Round of 16: defeated Dennis Talbot (Australia) by decision, 5–0
- Quarterfinal: defeated Volodymyr Ivanov (Soviet Union) by decision, 3–2
- Semifinal: defeated Ralph Evans (Great Britain) by decision, 5–0
- Final: defeated Kim U-gil (North Korea) by decision, 5-0 (won gold medal)
