= Issake Dabore =

Nigerien boxer (1940–2021)

Personal information
- Nickname: Aradou
- Nationality: Nigerien
- Born: 1940
- Died: 25 December 2021 (aged 80–81)
- Height: 163 cm (5 ft 4 in)
- Weight: 64 kg (141 lb)

Sport
- Sport: Boxing
- Weight class: Welterweight; Light-welterweight
Medal record
Representing Niger
Summer Olympic Games
| Bronze medal – third place | 1972 Munich | Light-welterweight |
African Games
| Silver medal – second place | 1965 Brazzaville | Welterweight |
| Silver medal – second place | 1973 Lagos | Light-welterweight |
- Updated on 10 February 2017

Issake Dabore (1940 – 25 December 2021) was a boxer from Niger who mainly fought in the light-welterweight and welterweight weight classes. Dabore competed at three Olympics; Tokyo 1964, Mexico City 1968 and Munich 1972. He was the first Nigerien person to compete at the Olympics and the first Nigerien to win an Olympic medal. Dabore won his Olympic medal at the 1972 Munich Olympics, where he won a bronze medal in the men's light-welterweight.

== Competition ==
=== 1964 Summer Olympics ===
At the 1964 Summer Olympics in Tokyo, Japan, Dabore competed in the men's welterweight competition. By doing so, he became the first person from Niger to compete at an Olympics. Dabore was the only athlete from Niger who competed at the games. In his competition, Dabore was drawn against Hong Tshun Fu of Taiwan in the first round. Dabore won the fight due to a technical knockout. In the second round, in which sixteen athletes competed in, Dabore was drawn against and beat Hans-Erik Pedersen of Denmark. Dabore again won the fight due to a technical knockout. In the quarterfinals held on 19 October 1964, Dabore was drawn against Pertti Purhonen who had defeated Australian Frank Roberts and Czechoslovak Bohumil Němeček to reach the quarterfinal stage. Purhonen won the fight 3–2 and, therefore, Dabore was eliminated. The competition was eventually won by Marian Kasprzyk of Poland.

=== 1965 All-Africa Games ===
At the 1965 All-Africa Games in Brazzaville, Dabore participated in the welterweight competition. He won the silver medal, losing in the final to Joseph Bessala of Cameroon.

=== 1968 Summer Olympics ===
At the 1968 Summer Olympics in Mexico City, Mexico, Dabore competed in the men's light-welterweight competition. He was one of two Nigeriens who competed at the games, with fellow male boxer Dary Dasuda the other. In the second round of his competition (he had a bye in the first), Dabore was drawn against José Marín of Costa Rica. Dabore won the fight 5–0 and he therefore progressed to the third round. In the third round, Dabore lost 4–1 to Yevgeny Frolov of the Soviet Union. Dabore was, therefore, eliminated from the competition; a competition that was eventually won by Jerzy Kulej of Poland.

=== 1972 Summer Olympics ===
At the 1972 Summer Olympics in Munich, Germany, Dabore competed in the men's light-welterweight competition. Dabore was one of four athletes from Niger who competed at the 1972 games. The other three athletes; Mayaki Seydou, Harouna Lago and Issoufou Habou; were all also boxers. Dabore carried the Nigerien flag in the opening ceremony. In the first round of his competition, Dabore fought against Odartey Lawson of Ghana. Dabore beat Lawson due to a technical knockout. In the second round, Dabore beat South Korean Park Tai-Shik, again due to a technical knockout. In the quarterfinals, Dabore faced Kyoji Shinohara of Japan. Dabore won the fight 3–2 to progress to the semi-finals. In his semi-final, Dabore faced Bulgarian Angel Angelov. Angelov won the fight 5–0 and, therefore, Dabore was eliminated. Dabore, along with the other loser in the semi-finals, Zvonimir Vujin of Yugoslavia, won a bronze medal. Dabore's medal was Niger's first ever Olympic medal. As of 2016, only one other Nigerien athlete has won an Olympic medal. That was Abdoul Razak Issoufou, who won a silver medal at the 2016 Summer Olympics in Taekwondo.

=== 1973 All-Africa Games ===
At the 1973 All-Africa Games in Lagos, Dabore participated in the light-welterweight competition. He won the silver medal, losing in the final to Obisia Nwankpa of Nigeria.

Olympic Games
| Preceded by | Flagbearer for Niger; 1972 Munich | Succeeded by Boubagar Soumana |
