= Enrique Rodríguez (boxer) =

Spanish boxer (1951–2022)

Personal information
- Born: 19 November 1951 Candás, Asturias, Spain
- Died: 23 November 2022 (aged 71) Avilés, Spain
Medal record
Men's Boxing
Representing Spain
Olympic Games
Bronze medal – third place	1972 Munich	Light Flyweight
World Amateur Championships
Bronze medal – third place	1974 Havana	Light Flyweight
European Amateur Championships
Bronze medal – third place	1973 Belgrade	Light Flyweight
Silver medal – second place	1975 Katowice	Light Flyweight
Mediterranean Games
Gold medal – first place	1971 Izmir	Light Flyweight
Gold medal – first place	1975 Algiers	Light Flyweight

Enrique Rodríguez Cal (19 November 1951 – 23 November 2022) was a Spanish boxer who won the bronze medal in the light flyweight division (– 48 kg) division at the 1972 Summer Olympics. It was Spain's only medal in Munich, West Germany. He captured the bronze medal at the inaugural 1974 World Championships in Havana, Cuba. Rodríguez also represented his native country at the 1976 Summer Olympics, where he was eliminated in the first round, and carried the flag at the opening ceremony.

Rodríguez died on 23 November 2022, at the age of 71.

== Olympic results ==
1972

- Defeated Alexandru Turei (Romania) 3-2
- Defeated Davey Armstrong (United States) 5-0
- Defeated Rafael Carbonell (Cuba) 4-1
- Lost to Kim U-Gil (North Korea) 2-3

1976

- Lost to Serdamba Batsuk (Mongolia) RSC 3

== Sources ==
- Spanish Olympic Committee
