= John Bambrick =

Scottish boxer

Personal information
- Nationality: British (Scottish)
- Born: 1955 or 1956 (age 70–71)

Boxing career
- Club: Edinburgh Transport ABC
Medal record
Men's amateur boxing
Representing Scotland
European Championships
| Bronze medal – third place | 1973 Belgrade | Light flyweight |
Commonwealth Games
| Bronze medal – third place | 1974 Christchurch | Light flyweight |

John Bambrick (born 1955/1956) (Note: Bambrick was 17 years old in 1973) is a Scottish former amateur boxer who won medals at the Commonwealth Games and European Championships.

== Biography ==
Bambrick was a member of the Edinburgh Transport Amateur Boxing Club and competed at the 1973 European Amateur Boxing Championships, winning the bronze medal in the light flyweight event.

The following year in 1974, he represented the Scottish Commonwealth Games team at the 1974 British Commonwealth Games in Christchurch, New Zealand, participating in the light-flyweight category. He won the bronze medal after victories over Shivran Sutar of India and Mickey Abrams of England before losing to the eventual gold medal winner Stephen Muchoki of Kenya in the semi-final bout.

In 1977 he won the prestigious bantamweight ABA Championship at the Empire Pool, Wembley.
