= Nosrat Vakil Monfared =

Iranian boxer

Personal information
- Nationality: Iranian
- Born: 19 January 1947 Bandar-e Anzali, Iran
- Died: 8 April 2016 (aged 69) Bandar-e Anzali, Iran

Sport
- Sport: Boxing

Nosrat Vakil Monfared (Persian: نصرت وکیل منفرد; 19 January 1947 – 8 April 2016) was an Iranian boxer. He competed in the men's light welterweight event at the 1972 Summer Olympics. At the 1972 Summer Olympics, he lost to Jim Montague of Ireland, and finished in 17th place.
