= Andrés Molina (boxer) =

Cuban boxer (1944–2003)

Personal information
- Full name: Andrés Molina Casañola
- Born: 10 November 1944 Las Villas, Cuba
- Died: 12 November 2003 (aged 59) Santa Clara, Cuba
- Height: 168 cm (5 ft 6 in)
- Weight: 64 kg (141 lb)

Sport
- Sport: Boxing
- Weight class: Welterweight
Medal record
Men's boxing
Representing Cuba
Central American and Caribbean Games
Gold medal – first place	1966 San Juan	Welterweight -67 kg
Pan American Games
Gold medal – first place	1967 Winnipeg	Welterweight -67 kg

Andrés Molina Casañola (Note: In this Spanish name, the first or paternal surname is Molina and the second or maternal family name is Casañola.) (10 November 1944 – 12 November 2003) was a Cuban boxer. He competed at the 1968 Summer Olympics and the 1972 Summer Olympics. At the 1968 Summer Olympics, he lost to Manfred Wolke of East Germany. At the 1972 Summer Olympics, he defeated Pentti Saarman and Anatoliy Kamnev, before losing to Ray Seales.
