= Vujin =

Vujin (Serbian Cyrillic: Вујин) is a Serbian surname. Notable people with the surname include:

- Marko Vujin (born 1984), Serbian handball player
- Zvonimir Vujin (1943–2019), Yugoslav boxer
