= Dave Needham =

Dave Needham may refer to:

- David Needham (born 1949), English former footballer
- Dave Needham (boxer) (1951–2008), British boxer
