= Andrés Molina =

Andrés Molina may refer to:

- Andrés Molina (boxer), Cuban boxer
- Andrés Molina Magofke, Chilean politician
- Andrés Molina Enríquez, Mexican revolutionary intellectual and author
- Andrés Molina (Mexico City Metrobús), Metrobús station in Mexico City
