= Howard Hayes =

Howard Hayes may refer to:

- Howard Hayes (athlete) (1877–1937), American athlete
- Howard Hayes (boxer) (born 1949), British boxer
- Howard Hayes Scullard (1903–1983), British historian
