= Nwankpa =

Nwankpa is a surname of Nigerian origin, specifically from the Igbo culture in Southeastern Nigeria. Notable people with the surname include:

- Obisia Nwankpa (1950–2025), Nigerian boxer
- Xavier Nwankpa (born 2003), American football player
