= Turei =

Turei is a Māori and Romanian surname that may refer to the following people:

- Alexandru Turei (b. 1952), Romanian boxer
- Brown Turei (1924–2017), New Zealand Māori religious leader
- Bronwyn Turei (b. 1984), New Zealand actress and singer
- Metiria Turei (b. 1970), New Zealand politician and artist
- Mohi Tūrei (c.1830–1914), New Zealand Māori tribal leader
- Raukura Turei (b. 1987), New Zealand Māori artist, actor and architect

== See also ==
- Dragon's Teeth (Star Trek: Voyager)
