= Vanduin Batbayar =

Mongolian boxer (born 1950)

Personal information
- Nationality: Mongolian
- Born: 25 December 1950 (age 75)
- Height: 161 cm (5 ft 3 in)
- Weight: 48 kg (106 lb)

Boxing career
- Weight class: Light flyweight

Vanduin Batbayar (Вандуйн Батбаяр, born 25 December 1950) is a Mongolian boxer. He competed in the men's light flyweight event at the 1972 Summer Olympics. At the 1972 Summer Olympics, he lost to Héctor Velásquez of Chile.
