= Asen Nikolov =

Asen Nikolov may refer to:

- Asen Nikolov (footballer)
- Asen Nikolov (boxer)
- Asen Nikolov (officer)
