= Johnny Banham =

English boxer (1943–1992)

Personal information
- Nationality: British (English)
- Born: 27 November 1943 Doncaster, England
- Died: 3 December 1992 (aged 49)

Sport
- Sport: Boxing
- Event: light-heavyweight
- Club: Metropolitan Police BC; Fitzroy Lodge ABC

Johnny Banham (27 November 1943 – 3 December 1992) was a male boxer who competed for England.

== Biography ==
Banham was the ABA London champion in 1972 after winning the 1972 light-heavyweight championships.

He represented the England team at the 1970 British Commonwealth Games in Edinburgh, Scotland, where he participated in the -81 kg light-heavyweight division.

He was a member of the Metropolitan Police Boxing Club and the Fitzroy Lodge ABC.
