= Tony Oxley (boxer) =

English boxer

Personal information
- Nationality: British (English)
- Born: 1942 Bradford, England
- Died: 19 April 2015 (aged 72) Maidstone, England

Sport
- Sport: Boxing
- Event: Bantamweight
- Club: Royal Navy BC

Anthony Oxley (1942 – 19 April 2015), was a male international boxer who competed for England, a national boxing coach and international security officer. He fought as Tony Oxley.

== Biography ==
Oxley joined the Royal Navy in 1961 and left in 1983, he then joined HM Diplomatic Service as a security officer.

Oxley represented the England team at the 1970 British Commonwealth Games in Edinburgh, Scotland, where he participated in the 54 kg bantamweight division.

Oxley was the National champion in 1971 after winning the 1971 bantamweight ABA championships. He also won the Royal Navy and Combined Services championships.

In 1974 he was appointed the Royal Navy coach and an England coach the following year. Between 1978 and 1982 his team won five back-to-back Combined Services championships and five ABA titles.
