= Dave Simmonds (boxer) =

English boxer (born c.1950)

Personal information
- Nationality: British (English)
- Born: c. 1950

Sport
- Sport: Boxing
- Event: Light-middlweight
- Club: Cinderford & Gloucester ABC

Dave Simmonds (born c. 1950) is a male former boxer who competed for England who competed at the Commonwealth Games.

== Biography ==
Simmonds won the 1970 Amateur Boxing Association British light-middleweight title, when boxing out of the Gloucester ABC.

Simmonds represented the England team at the 1970 British Commonwealth Games in Edinburgh, Scotland, where he participated in the 71 kg light-middleweight division.

He turned professional and fought in 4 fights from 1974 until 1980.
