= Abdou Fall =

Senegalese boxer

Personal information
- Nationality: Senegalese

Sport
- Sport: Boxing

Abdou Fall is a Senegalese boxer. He competed in the men's light welterweight event at the 1972 Summer Olympics.
