= Arif Doğru =

Turkish boxer

Personal information
- Nationality: Turkish
- Born: 4 June 1951 (age 73); Boğazlıyan, Turkey

Sport
- Sport: Boxing

Arif Doğru (born 4 June 1951) is a Turkish boxer. He competed in the men's light flyweight event at the 1972 Summer Olympics.
