= 1969 European Amateur Boxing Championships =

Boxing competitions

- Host city: Bucharest
- Country: Romania
- Nations: 25
- Athletes: 180
- Dates: 30 May–8 June

The 1969 European Amateur Boxing Championships were held in Bucharest, Romania from 30 May to 8 June. The 18th edition of the bi-annual competition was organised by the European governing body for amateur boxing, EABA. There were 180 fighters from 25 countries participating.

The Light Flyweight (– 48 kilograms) category was contested for the first time.

== Medal winners ==
Event	Gold	Silver	Bronze
Light Flyweight (– 48 kilograms)	György Gedo; Hungary	Franco Udella; Italy	José Escudero; Spain Roman Rożek; Poland
Flyweight (– 51 kilograms)	Constantin Ciucă; Romania	Nikolay Novikov; Soviet Union	Filippo Grasso; Italy Artur Olech; Poland
Bantamweight (– 54 kilograms)	Aurel Dumitrescu; Romania	Aldo Cosentino; France	(Republic of Ireland) Michael Dowling; Ireland Mickey Piner; England
Featherweight (– 57 kilograms)	László Orbán; Hungary	Seyfi Tatar; Turkey	Ivan Mihailov; Bulgaria Alan Richardson; England
Lightweight (– 60 kilograms)	Calistrat Cuțov; Romania	Stoyan Pilichev; Bulgaria	Sergey Lomakin; Soviet Union Ryszard Petek; Poland
Light Welterweight (– 63.5 kilograms)	Valeriy Frolov; Soviet Union	Petar Stoitchev; Bulgaria	Gianbattista Capretti; Italy Bogdan Jakubowski; Poland
Welterweight (– 67 kilograms)	Günther Meier; West Germany	Victor Zilberman; Romania	Ivan Kiryakov; Bulgaria Vladimir Musalimov; Soviet Union
Light Middleweight (– 71 kilograms)	Valery Tregubov; Soviet Union	Bruno Facchetti; Italy	Ion Covaci; Romania Tom Imrie; Scotland
Middleweight (– 75 kilograms)	Vladimir Tarassenko; Soviet Union	(Socialist Federal Republic of Yugoslavia) Mate Parlov; Yugoslavia	Simeon Georgiev; Bulgaria Reima Virtanen; Finland
Light Heavyweight (– 81 kilograms)	Danas Pozniakas; Soviet Union	Ion Monea; Romania	Ralf Jensen; Denmark Jürgen Schlegel; East Germany
Heavyweight (+ 81 kilograms)	Ion Alexe; Romania	Kiril Pandov; Bulgaria	Ludwik Denderys; Poland Peter Hussing; West Germany

== Medal table ==
* Host nation (Romania)

Rank	Nation	Gold	Silver	Bronze	Total
1	Romania (ROU)*	4	2	1	7
2	Soviet Union (URS)	4	1	2	7
3	Hungary (HUN)	2	0	0	2
4	West Germany (FRG)	1	0	1	2
5	Bulgaria (BUL)	0	3	3	6
6	Italy (ITA)	0	2	2	4
7	France (FRA)	0	1	0	1
7	Turkey (TUR)	0	1	0	1
7	Yugoslavia (YUG)	0	1	0	1
10	Poland (POL)	0	0	5	5
11	England (ENG)	0	0	2	2
12	Denmark (DEN)	0	0	1	1
12	East Germany (GDR)	0	0	1	1
12	Finland (FIN)	0	0	1	1
12	Ireland (IRL)	0	0	1	1
12	Scotland (SCO)	0	0	1	1
12	Spain (ESP)	0	0	1	1
Totals (17 entries)		11	11	22	44
