= Obisia Nwankpa =

Nigerian boxer (1949–2025)

Personal information
- Nickname: Golden Gloves
- Nationality: Nigerian
- Born: 14 June 1949 Lagos, Colony and Protectorate of Nigeria
- Died: 3 June 2025 (aged 75)
- Weight: Light, light welterweight

Boxing career

Boxing record
- Total fights: 29
- Wins: 23 (KO 16)
- Losses: 6 (KO 3)

Obisia "Golden Gloves" Nwankpa (14 June 1949 – 3 June 2025) was a Nigerian professional light and light welterweight boxer of the 1970s, 1980s, and 1990s who won Nigerian lightweight title, African Boxing Union light welterweight title, and Commonwealth lightweight title, and was a challenger for World Boxing Council (WBC) light welterweight title against Saoul Mamby. His professional fighting weight varied from 135 lb (61 kg; 9 st 9 lb), i.e. lightweight to 139 1/4 lb (63.2 kg; 9 st 13.3 lb), i.e. light welterweight.

Nwankpa competed in the men's light welterweight event at the 1972 Summer Olympics. At the 1972 Summer Olympics, he lost in his first fight to Laudiel Negron of Puerto Rico.

At the 1973 All-Africa Games in Lagos, Nwankpa participated in the light-welterweight competition. He won the gold medal, defeating Issake Dabore of Niger in the final. He also won the gold medal in the light-welterweight category at the 1974 British Commonwealth Games, defeating Anthony Martey of Ghana in the final.

Nwankpa died on 3 June 2025, at the age of 75.
