= Les Stevens (boxer) =

English boxer (1951–2020)

Personal information
- Nationality: British (English)
- Born: 7 March 1951
- Died: 25 April 2020 (aged 69)

Sport
- Sport: Boxing
- Event: Heavyweight
- Club: Reading ABC
Medal record
Men's Boxing
Representing England
Commonwealth Games
Bronze medal – third place	1970 Edinburgh	heavyweight

Leslie Stevens (7 March 1951 – 25 April 2020) was a boxer who competed for England.

== Boxing career ==
Stevens won the Amateur Boxing Association 1971 heavyweight title, when boxing out of the Reading Amateur Boxing Club.

Stevens represented the England team at the 1970 British Commonwealth Games in Edinburgh, Scotland, where he participated in the 91kg heavyweight category event, winning a bronze medal.

He turned professional on 13 September 1971 and fought in 27 fights until 1979.
