= Sugar Ray Seales =

American boxer (born 1952)

Ray Seales
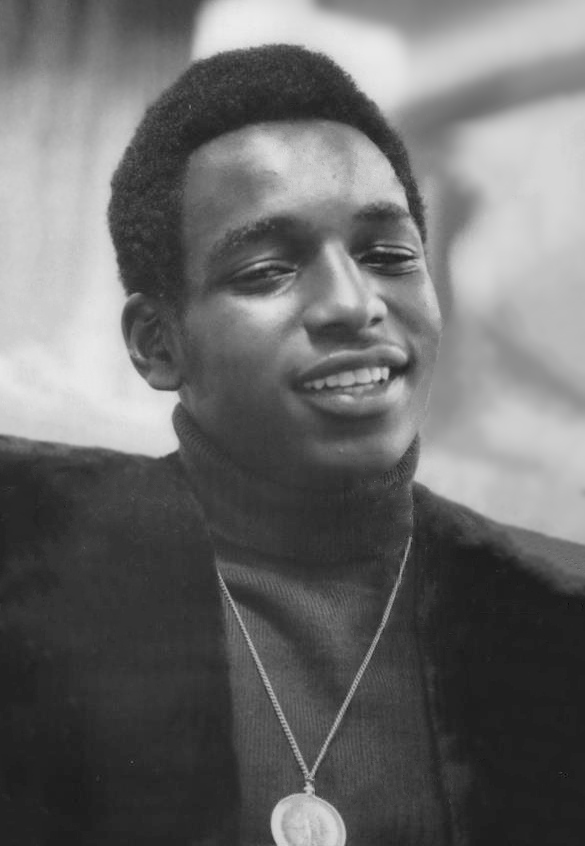
- Seales in 1973

Personal information
- Nickname: Sugar
- Nationality: American
- Born: 4 September 1952 (age 73) Saint Croix, U.S. Virgin Islands
- Height: 6 ft 1 in (185 cm)
- Weight: Middleweight

Boxing career
- Stance: Southpaw

Boxing record
- Total fights: 68
- Wins: 57
- Win by KO: 34
- Losses: 8
- Draws: 3
Medal record
Representing the United States
Olympic Games
Gold medal – first place	1972 Munich	Light welterweight
North American Championships
Gold medal – first place	1971 Latham	Light welterweight

"Sugar" Ray Seales, (born September 4, 1952) is an American former boxer. He was the only American boxer to win a gold medal in the 1972 Summer Olympics. As a professional, he fought middleweight champion Marvin Hagler three times. He is also the former NABF and USBA middleweight champion.

== Family and early life ==
Seales was born in the U.S. Virgin Islands, where his father, who boxed in the U.S. Army, was stationed. The Seales family moved to Tacoma, Washington in 1965. He is the half-brother of boxer Dale Grant and the brother of boxer Wilbur Seales.

== Career ==
=== Olympic ===
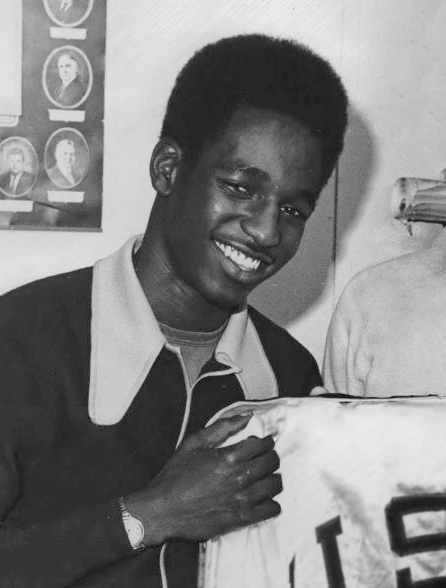
Sugar Ray Seales

Seales was a product of the Tacoma Boys Club amateur boxing program, and was coached by Joe Clough.

Amateur record: 338–12

- 1972 Olympic gold medalist (139 lbs.)
- 1971 National AAU light welterweight champion
- 1972 National Golden Gloves 139 pounds champion, defeating Donnie Nelson of Lowell, MA in the final

=== 1972 Olympic results ===
- Round of 32: defeated Ulrich Beyer (East Germany) on points
- Round of 16: defeated Jim Montague (Ireland) on points
- Quarterfinal: defeated Andres Molina (Cuba) 3–2
- Semifinal: defeated Zvonimir Vujin (Yugoslavia) 5–0
- Final: defeated Angel Angelov (Bulgaria) 3–2

=== Professional ===
Seales was a contender for the middleweight title during the late '70s and early '80s, winning the regional level USBA and NABF titles in the process. In his two most memorable fights, he lost a narrow decision to future middleweight champion Marvin Hagler in July 1974, then drew with Hagler in a rematch three months later. After losing to European champion Alan Minter in 1976, Seales remained on the outskirts of contention, until a first-round technical knockout at the hands of Hagler effectively ended his title hopes.

== Retirement ==
In 1980, Seales injured his left eye in a fight with Jaime Thomas, and retired due to a serious retinal tear. He was subsequently declared legally blind, and was used as a cause célèbre along with Sugar Ray Leonard during the 1980s for those pushing for a ban on boxing.

== Life after boxing ==
Years later, doctors operated and restored Seales' vision in his right eye, though he wears glasses. Seales later worked as a schoolteacher of autistic students at Lincoln High School in Tacoma for 17 years, retiring in 2004. In 2006, he moved to Indianapolis with his wife, and currently teaches at Indy Boxing and Grappling.

== Honors ==
Seales was a 2005 inductee into the Tacoma-Pierce County Sports Hall of Fame.

On May 5, 2018, Seales was inducted to the Indiana Boxing Hall of Fame in their inaugural class.

== Professional boxing record ==
68 fights	57 wins	8 losses
By knockout	34	3
By decision	23	5
Draws	3	

No.	Result	Record	Opponent	Type	Round, time	Date	Location	Notes
68	Win	57–8–3	Max Hord	TKO	1 (10), 2:44	Jan 22, 1983	Regency Hotel, Denver, Colorado, U.S.	
67	Loss	56–8–3	James Shuler	UD	12	Oct 23, 1982	Great Gorge Resort, McAfee, New Jersey, U.S.	Lost NABF middleweight title
66	Win	56–7–3	Jesse Lara	KO	3 (10), 1:29	Aug 7, 1982	University of New Mexico, Albuquerque, New Mexico, U.S.	
65	Win	55–7–3	John LoCicero	UD	10	Mar 31, 1982	Felt Forum, New York City, New York, U.S.	
64	Win	54–7–3	Alejo Rodriguez	TKO	6 (10), 1:07	Jan 23, 1982	Sahara Tahoe Hotel, Stateline, Nevada, U.S.	
63	Win	53–7–3	Juan Rivas	KO	1 (10), 2:34	Sep 23, 1981	Civic Auditorium, Bakersfield, California, U.S.	
62	Win	52–7–3	Sammy NeSmith	KO	5 (12), 1:00	Mar 31, 1981	Market Square Arena, Indianapolis, Indiana, U.S.	Retained NABF middleweight title
61	Win	51–7–3	James Williams	UD	10	Dec 23, 1980	Bicentennial Pavilion, Tacoma, Washington, U.S.	
60	Win	50–7–3	Jamie Thomas	UD	10	Aug 2, 1980	Centroplex, Baton Rouge, Louisiana, U.S.	
59	Loss	49–7–3	Dwight Davison	TKO	10 (10), 1:47	May 23, 1980	Pine Knob Music Theatre, Clarkston, Michigan, U.S.	
58	Win	49–6–3	Ted Sanders	RTD	7 (10), 3:00	Apr 19, 1980	MetraPark, Billings, Montana, U.S.	
57	Win	48–6–3	Art Harris	TKO	6 (10), 2:35	Apr 5, 1980	Armory, Akron, Ohio, U.S.	
56	Draw	47–6–3	Mike Colbert	PTS	12	Jun 21, 1979	Seattle Center Arena, Seattle, Washington, U.S.	For vacant Pacific Northwest middleweight title
55	Win	47–6–2	Raul Adams	TKO	3 (10), 2:15	Mar 24, 1979	Paul E. Joseph Stadium, Frederiksted, U.S. Virgin Islands	
54	Loss	46–6–2	Marvin Hagler	TKO	1 (10), 1:26	Feb 3, 1979	Boston Garden, Boston, Massachusetts, U.S.	
53	Loss	46–5–2	Ayub Kalule	MD	10	Nov 9, 1978	Brondby Hallen, Brondby, Denmark	
52	Win	46–4–2	Sammy NeSmith	TKO	5 (15), 2:49	Aug 29, 1978	Seattle Center Arena, Seattle, Washington, U.S.	Retained USBA middleweight title
51	Win	45–4–2	Johnny Heard	UD	10	Jun 28, 1978	DC Armory, Washington, D.C., U.S.	
50	Win	44–4–2	Tommy Howard	UD	12	Jun 20, 1978	Seattle Center Coliseum, Seattle, Washington, U.S.	
49	Win	43–4–2	Mayfield Pennington	TKO	8 (10), 2:57	Apr 8, 1978	High School Gym, Pikeville, Kentucky, U.S.	
48	Draw	42–4–2	Willie Warren	SD	10	Feb 28, 1978	Seattle Center Arena, Seattle, Washington, U.S.	
47	Win	42–4–1	Emmett Atlas	TKO	2 (10), 2:43	Jan 26, 1978	Seattle Center Arena, Seattle, Washington, U.S.	
46	Win	41–4–1	Doug Demmings	UD	15	Dec 2, 1977	Auditorium Theatre, Chicago, Illinois, U.S.	Won vacant USBA middleweight title
45	Win	40–4–1	Joe Gonsalves	KO	5 (10), 1:22	Oct 25, 1977	Seattle Center Coliseum, Seattle, Washington, U.S.	
44	Win	39–4–1	Mike Hallacy	UD	10	Sep 21, 1977	Municipal Auditorium, West Memphis, Arkansas, Kansas, U.S.	
43	Win	38–4–1	Eddie Davis	KO	7 (10)	Sep 6, 1977	Municipal Auditorium, West Memphis, Arkansas, U.S.	
42	Win	37–4–1	Nate Lenoir	KO	2 (10)	Jul 19, 1977	Seattle Center Arena, Seattle, Washington, U.S.	
41	Win	36–4–1	Vicente Medina	UD	10	Jun 29, 1977	Anchorage Sports Arena, Anchorage, Alaska, U.S.	Retained NABF middleweight title
40	Win	35–4–1	Clifford Wills	UD	10	Jun 22, 1977	Exhibition Gardens, Vancouver, British Columbia, Canada	
39	Win	34–4–1	Johnny Heard	KO	2 (10), 1:40	Jun 9, 1977	Civic Center, Butte, Montana, U.S.	
38	Win	33–4–1	Tony Gardner	KO	4 (15), 2:28	May 25, 1977	Anchorage Sports Arena, Anchorage, Alaska, U.S.	Retained NABF middleweight title
37	Win	32–4–1	George Davis	TKO	2 (10), 2:59	Apr 26, 1977	Seattle Center Arena, Seattle, Washington, U.S.	
36	Loss	31–4–1	Ronnie Harris	UD	10	Mar 2, 1977	Madison Square Garden, New York City, New York, U.S.	
35	Loss	31–3–1	Alan Minter	TKO	5 (10), 2:14	Dec 7, 1976	Royal Albert Hall, Kensington, England	
34	Win	31–2–1	Gianni Mingardi	TKO	6 (8)	Oct 15, 1976	Palasport di San Siro, Milan, Italy	
33	Win	30–2–1	Bobby Hoye	KO	4 (12), 2:18	May 25, 1976	Seattle Center Arena, Seattle, Washington, U.S.	Retained NABF middleweight title
32	Win	29–2–1	George Cooper	UD	12	Mar 9, 1976	Seattle Center Coliseum, Seattle, Washington, U.S.	Won NABF middleweight title
31	Win	28–2–1	Renato Garcia	MD	10	Dec 2, 1975	Seattle Center Arena, Seattle, Washington, U.S.	
30	Win	27–2–1	Mike Lankester	KO	2 (10), 1:45	Oct 21, 1975	Seattle Center Arena, Seattle, Washington, U.S.	
29	Loss	26–2–1	Eugene Hart	PTS	10	Sep 15, 1975	Convention Hall, Atlantic City, New Jersey, U.S.	
28	Win	26–1–1	Rudy Cruz	UD	10	May 13, 1975	Memorial Auditorium, Sacramento, California, U.S.	
27	Win	25–1–1	Manuel Elizondo	KO	2 (10), 1:50	Apr 22, 1975	Memorial Auditorium, Sacramento, California, U.S.	
26	Win	24–1–1	Johnny Rico	UD	10	Mar 28, 1975	Community Center, Tucson, Washington, U.S.	
25	Win	23–1–1	Mike Nixon	UD	10	Feb 11, 1975	Seattle Center Coliseum, Seattle, Washington, U.S.	
24	Draw	22–1–1	Marvin Hagler	MD	10	Nov 26, 1974	Seattle Center Coliseum, Seattle, Washington, U.S.	
23	Win	22–1	Les Riggins	TKO	2 (10)	Sep 17, 1974	Seattle Center Coliseum, Seattle, Washington, U.S.	
22	Loss	21–1	Marvin Hagler	UD	10	Aug 30, 1974	WNAC-TV Studio, Boston, Massachusetts, U.S.	
21	Win	21–0	David Love	TKO	12 (12), 2:45	Aug 6, 1974	U. of Puget Sound Fieldhouse, Tacoma, Washington, U.S.	
20	Win	20–0	John L. Sullivan	TKO	2 (10)	Jun 8, 1974	Saint Martin's Pavilion, Lacey, Washington, U.S.	Won vacant Pacific Northwest middleweight title
19	Win	19–0	Jose Martin Flores	TKO	4 (10)	Apr 16, 1974	U. of Puget Sound Fieldhouse, Tacoma, Washington, U.S.	
18	Win	18–0	Joe Espinosa	KO	10 (10), 2:42	Mar 19, 1974	Denver Coliseum, Denver, Colorado, U.S.	
17	Win	17–0	Beto Gonzalez	KO	3 (10), 2:45	Mar 6, 1974	Centennial Coliseum, Reno, Nevada, U.S.	
16	Win	16–0	Omar Chavez	KO	8 (10), 2:44	Feb 27, 1974	Circus Circus Hippodrome Theater, Las Vegas, Nevada, U.S.	
15	Win	15–0	Angel Robinson Garcia	UD	10	Feb 13, 1974	Circus Circus Hippodrome Theater, Las Vegas, Nevada, U.S.	
14	Win	14–0	Jose Miranda	UD	10	Dec 11, 1973	Civic Auditorium, San Francisco, California, U.S.	
13	Win	13–0	Dave Coventry	TKO	4 (10), 1:38	Nov 11, 1973	Sports Arena, Portland, Oregon, U.S.	
12	Win	12–0	Roy Barrientos	UD	10	Oct 11, 1973	Memorial Auditorium, Dallas, Texas, U.S.	
11	Win	11–0	Chucho Garcia	UD	10	Aug 22, 1973	Cheney Stadium, Tacoma, Washington, U.S.	
10	Win	10–0	Chu Chu Padilla	TKO	2 (10), 2:25	Jul 27, 1973	Community Center, Tucson, Arizona, U.S.	
9	Win	9–0	Frank Davila	UD	10	Jul 7, 1973	Gardnerville Ballpark, Gardnerville, Nevada, U.S.	
8	Win	8–0	Leroy Romero	UD	10	Jun 25, 1973	Civic Center, Butte, Montana, U.S.	
7	Win	7–0	Roger Buckskin	TKO	5 (10), 3:00	May 19, 1973	Hoquiam High School Gym, Hoquiam, Washington, U.S.	
6	Win	6–0	Chico Andrade	TKO	3 (8)	Apr 12, 1973	Centennial Coliseum, Reno, Nevada, U.S.	
5	Win	5–0	Jose Miranda	UD	8	Mar 26, 1973	Lane County Fairgrounds, Eugene, Oregon, U.S.	
4	Win	4–0	Felix Alvarado	UD	8	Mar 15, 1973	Seattle Center Arena, Seattle, Washington, U.S.	
3	Win	3–0	Sugar Montgomery	TKO	6 (8)	Mar 1, 1973	Civic Auditorium, Stockton, California, U.S.	
2	Win	2–0	Conrad Green	KO	2 (8), 2:03	Feb 12, 1973	Lane County Fairgrounds, Eugene, Oregon, U.S.	
1	Win	1–0	Gonzalo Rodriguez	UD	8	Jan 11, 1973	U. of Puget Sound Fieldhouse, Tacoma, Washington, U.S.	

Awards and achievements
Preceded by Tony Licata	NABF Middleweight Champion; May 25, 1976 – June 21, 1977; Vacated	Vacant Title next held by Ralph Palladin
Vacant Title last held by Tony Licata	USBA Middleweight Champion; December 2, 1977 – May 4, 1980; Vacated	Vacant Title next held by Curtis Parker
Preceded by Sammy NeSmith	NABF Middleweight Champion; March 31, 1981 – October 23, 1982	Succeeded by James Shuler
