= Walter Gómez (boxer) =

Argentine boxer

Personal information
- Born: 25 March 1953; Bernasconi, Argentina
- Died: 30 March 2015 (aged 62); Buenos Aires, Argentina

Sport
- Sport: Boxing

Walter Desiderio Gómez (25 March 1953 – 30 March 2015) was an Argentine boxer. He competed in the men's light welterweight event at the 1972 Summer Olympics. After his boxing career, he worked as a coach at a gym in Rio Gallegos.
