= Frankie Lucas =

Vincentian and British boxer (1953–2023)

Personal information
- Nationality: Vincentian / British
- Born: 15 August 1953 Saint Vincent
- Died: 8 April 2023 (aged 69)

Sport
- Sport: boxing
Medal record
Men's Boxing
Representing Saint Vincent and the Grenadines
British Commonwealth Games
Gold medal – first place	1974 Christchurch	Middleweight

Frankie Lucas (15 August 1953 – 8 April 2023) was a boxer best known for winning the gold medal in the 1974 British Commonwealth Games in Christchurch, New Zealand in the middleweight category for St. Vincent and the Grenadines. In the final, Lucas defeated Julius Luipa of Zambia by knockout in the second round.

Lucas moved from Saint Vincent to Croydon, London when he was nine. In 1972 and 1973 Lucas won the British Amateur Boxing Association middleweight title boxing out of the Sir Philip Game ABC. He was not selected for the 1974 Commonwealth Games to represent England. The boxer he defeated in the 1973 ABA final, Carl Speare, was chosen instead. Lucas ultimately represented Saint Vincent in the Games, and defeated Speare in the semi-final in Christchurch. As a professional, he fought just 17 times and twice challenged for the British title, losing to Tony Sibson and Kevin Finnegan.

In 2002, it was reported that he was living in a council care home in North London. Previously, many in Lucas's former circle had not heard from Lucas in years and had assumed that he had died.

Lucas died on 8 April 2023, at the age of 69.

Lucas is the subject of a 2023 play by Rose Hollingsworth (Lisa Lintott) - Going for Gold, shown at the Chelsea Theatre from June 5th to June 8th. Going for Gold was published by Salamander Street in 2024.
