= Roman Rożek =

Polish boxer (born 1942)

Personal information
- Nationality: Polish
- Born: 5 August 1942 (age 83) Busko-Zdrój, Poland

Sport
- Sport: Boxing
Medal record
Men's amateur boxing
Representing Poland
European Amateur Championships
Bronze medal – third place	1969 Bucharest	Light Flyweight

Roman Rożek (born 5 August 1942) is a Polish boxer. He competed in the men's light flyweight event at the 1972 Summer Olympics.
