= Dur Muhammad Baloch =

Pakistani boxer (1982/1983–2023)

- Born: 1982/1983
- Died: 9 July 2023 (aged 40)
- Nationality: Pakistani
- Statistics
- Weight class: Welterweight

Dur Muhammad Baloch (1982/1983 – 9 July 2023) was a Pakistani international boxer and national champion. He participated in Boxing at the 2006 Asian Games – Men's 69 kg. Baloch had previously played for Karachi Port Trust and the Pakistan Navy, and had connections with the Merchant Navy.

Baloch was the nephew of Vice President of the Pakistan Boxing Federation and Secretary of the Sindh Boxing Association, Asghar Baloch. He lived in Lyari and is survived by a widow and three children. Baloch died from a heart attack while aboard a ship in a port in Africa on 9 July 2023. He was 40. His father, Olympian Malang Baloch, died seven months prior to his death.
