= Luis Contreras (boxer) =

Venezuelan boxer (born 1951)

Personal information
- Nationality: Venezuelan
- Born: 5 February 1951 (age 74)

Sport
- Sport: Boxing

Luis Contreras (born 5 February 1951) is a Venezuelan boxer. He competed in the men's light welterweight event at the 1972 Summer Olympics.
