= Vicente Arsenal =

Filipino boxer

Personal information
- Nationality: Filipino
- Born: July 10, 1948 (age 77)
- Height: 5 ft 5 in (165 cm)
- Weight: 106 lb (48 kg)

Sport
- Sport: Boxing

Vicente Arsenal (born July 10, 1948) is a Filipino former boxer. He competed in the men's light flyweight event at the 1972 Summer Olympics.

He later went on to become a coach for other Filipino amateur boxers competing for the Philippines in international competitions. He served as coach for Filipino boxers in the 2003 Southeast Asian Games with Elmer Pamisa as his assistant.

Arsenal also served in the Philippine Navy.
