= Lee Suk-un =

Korean male boxer

Personal information
- Nationality: South Korean
- Born: 17 March 1952 (age 73)

Sport
- Sport: Boxing

Lee Suk-un (born 17 March 1952) is a South Korean boxer. He competed in the men's light flyweight event at the 1972 Summer Olympics.
