= Krzysztof Pierwieniecki =

Polish boxer

Personal information
- Nationality: Polish
- Born: 7 April 1952 (age 72); Łubowo, Poland

Sport
- Sport: Boxing

Krzysztof Pierwieniecki (born 7 April 1952) is a Polish boxer. He competed in the men's light welterweight event at the 1972 Summer Olympics.
