= Yotham Kunda =

Zambian boxer (born 1948)

Personal information
- Nationality: Zambian
- Born: 25 November 1948 (age 76)

Sport
- Sport: Boxing

Yotham Kunda (born 25 November 1948) is a Zambian boxer. He competed in the men's light welterweight event at the 1972 Summer Olympics.
