= Malang Balouch =

Pakistani boxer (1948–2022)

Personal information
- Nationality: Pakistani
- Born: 10 August 1948
- Died: 17 December 2022 (aged 74)
- Children: Dur Muhammad Baloch

Sport
- Sport: Boxing

Malang Balouch (10 August 1948 – 17 December 2022) was a Pakistani boxer. He competed in the men's light welterweight event at the 1972 Summer Olympics.
