= Hans-Erik Pedersen =

Danish boxer

Personal information
- Nationality: Danish
- Born: 10 December 1943 Vejle, Denmark
- Died: 18 February 2022 (aged 78)

Sport
- Sport: Boxing

Hans-Erik Pedersen (10 December 1943 – 18 February 2022) was a Danish boxer. He competed in the men's welterweight event at the 1964 Summer Olympics. At the 1964 Summer Olympics, he defeated Boniface Hie Toh of the Ivory Coast, before losing to Issake Dabore of Niger.
