= Freddy Stephen Fuller =

Canadian boxer

Stephen Fuller
Sport
- Sport: Boxing
Medal record
Men's amateur boxing
Representing Canada
North American Championships
Gold medal – first place	1970 Vancouver	Light welterweight

Freddy Fuller is an ex-amateur boxer from British Columbia, Canada. He was a member of the 1967 Canadian Pan Am Games boxing team, a several times Canadian Amateur Boxing Champion in the 1960s and 1970, and a member of the Canadian boxing team for the 1970 Commonwealth Games.

== Fighting career ==
Fuller began his boxing journey in the 1950s at the Burnaby Boxing Club under coach Harry Twist, then joined the East Vancouver Optimist Club. In his junior years Fuller was twice named Emerald Boy and in 1963, he earned the BC Jr. Golden Boy award.

As a junior boxer Fuller won the 1963 Jr Golden Boy Award and the 1965 Golden Boy Award. Some of his Golden Gloves victories in the US were reported in The RING magazine in an article by Tony Simnett.

In 1965, Fuller was a Tacoma Golden Gloves champion.

Stan Smith, chairman of the British Columbia branch of the Amateur Athletic Union (AAU) in 1966 said: "Fuller is the best boxer I've seen in the Western Canadian area in 10 years".

In the final of the 1967 International Diamond Belt Centennial Boxing Championship light-welterweight division, Fuller fought against Dave Wylie which was featured on a boxing program in January 1968.

Fuller competed as part of the 1967 Pan Am Games Canadian Boxing Team.

In 1968, Fuller was one of 19 BC boxers to participate in the Seattle Golden Gloves that also was the Pacific Northwest AAU Championships. As winner, he went to Ohio in April 1968, to compete in the USA National Boxing Championships.

Fuller participated in the 1970 Commonwealth Games in the light-welterweight division. In that tournament, Prince George boxer Jack Meda earned a bronze medal. Some of the other Canadian boxers were Joe Cooke, Frank Scott, Marv Arneson and Darryl Olsen.

He won the 1970 BC Golden Gloves, Western Canadian Championships and the Canadian National Championships.

In 2010, Fuller was one of 14 boxers considered for inclusion in the British Columbia Amateur Boxing Hall Of Fame. In 2011, Fuller was to be an honorary director along with Irene Brough, Dick Findlay, David Ius and Blake Scott.

In January 2018, Fuller was joined in the BC Amateur Boxing Hall of Fame by former club and teammates Dave Wyley and Brian Zelley.
