= Angel Angelov =

Bulgarian boxer

Olympic medal record

Men's boxing
Silver medal – second place	1972 Munich	light-welterweight

Anghei Anghelov (more frequently transliterated as Angel Angelov) (Bulgarian: Ангел Ангелов; born July 10, 1948) is a former boxer from Bulgaria, who won a silver medal in the light welterweight division the 1972 Summer Olympics. Anghelov lost by decision in the final to American boxer Sugar Ray Seales.

1972 Olympic Results

Below are the results of Angel Angelov, a Bulgarian light welterweight boxer who competed at the 1972 Munich Olympics:

- Round of 32: defeated Luis Contreras (Venezuela) by third-round TKO
- Round of 16: defeated Walter Desiderio Gomez (Argentina) by decision, 4-1
- Quarterfinal: defeated Srisook Bantow (Thailand) by second-round TKO
- Semi-final: defeated Issaka Daborg (Niger) bey decision, 5-0
- Gold medal match: lost to Sugar Ray Seales (United States) by decision, 2-3 (was awarded silver medal)
