= Ernesto Bergamasco =

Italian boxer (1950–2024)

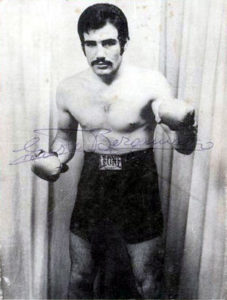

Personal information
- Nationality: Italian
- Born: 17 February 1950 Torre Annunziata, Italy
- Died: 17 March 2024 (aged 74) Torre Annunziata, Italy

Sport
- Sport: Boxing

Ernesto Bergamasco (17 February 1950 – 17 March 2024) was an Italian boxer. He represented Italy in the 1972 Olympics in Munich, West Germany.

== Biography ==
=== Amateur career ===
Bergamasco was the Italian amateur champion in the super lightweight division. In 1971 in Udine, Ernesto won the Italian super lightweight amateur title against Antonio Chiodoni. In the year of 1972 in Rome, Ernesto defended his title against Stefano Oppo.

Ernesto defended the Italian colors in many international competitions. He participated in the 1972 Olympics in Munich, losing in the first round of the light welterweight category to Thai boxer, Bantow Srisook (4ː1).

=== Professional career ===
Bergamasco turned professional right after the Olympics. He had a winning streak of 19 matches. Among his defeated opponents was the former Italian champion of the lightweight division, Bruno Melissano.

On 25 September 1974, he fought for the Italian Super Lightweight title but was defeated by technical knockout in the second round by Bruno Freschi. He continued to fight, racking up another six consecutive victories and then proceeding in the downward phase of his career. Between the end of 1975 and 1977 he fought 14 matches with only six wins and eight defeats. One of these, however, was suffered at the hands of Argentine naturalized Italian Juan José Giménez, future challenger of the American Leroy Haley for the WBC world title of the category and of Patrizio Oliva for the European title.

On 3 February 1978, he was given the chance to fight again for the Italian super lightweight belt but was again defeated by the future European champion Giuseppe Martinese with TKO in the eighth round. After this match he abandoned his competitive career.

=== Coaching career ===
Founder and manager of one of the most famous boxing clubs in the Vesuvius area, the Oplonti Boxing , as a coach he brought many high-value boxers to the ring, including his son Raffaele Bergamasco, multiple Italian champions, and among the professionals Alfonso Pinto (silver medal at the European Championships) and Pietro Aurino, engaged in London in 2000 as a failed challenger for the WBO world cruiserweight title.

=== YouTube ===
He went viral in the early 2010’s for a YouTube video in which he beat a much younger opponent in less than 20 seconds in a sparring match

=== Death ===
Bergamasco died in Torre Annunziata on 17 March 2024, at the age of 74.
