= Sammy NeSmith =

American boxer

Sammy NeSmith, known as Slammin' Sammy, was an American professional light middleweight boxer of the early 1970s.

NeSmith lived in Indianapolis during the 1970s and '80s, where he built his boxing career. In 1971, he won the National Golden Gloves Light middleweight championship. NeSmith won the North American Boxing Federation middleweight belt in Indianapolis in May 1980 after scoring a 10th-round knockout victory over Ronnie Harris of Canton, Ohio. On March 31, 1981, he lost that title to Sugar Ray Seales in a fifth-round knockout. Smith had a professional record of 38 wins and seven losses, with 34 of his wins by knockout.

NeSmith frequently volunteered as a boxing coach for youth at the Riverside Park & Family Center in Indianapolis. He later worked as a truck driver for the Coca-Cola Company in Indianapolis till 1991 when he relocated to New Jersey where he married Delores Green.

NeSmith died on January 20, 2014, of an apparent heart attack in New York City while at work. He was interred in Kingstree, South Carolina.
