= Yoshimitsu Aragaki =

Japanese boxer (1950–2002)

Personal information
- Nationality: Japanese
- Born: 14 August 1950
- Died: 15 March 2002 (aged 51)

Sport
- Sport: Boxing

Yoshimitsu Aragaki (新垣 吉光, Aragaki Yoshimitsu; born 14 August 1950 – 15 March 2002) was a Japanese boxer. He competed in the men's light flyweight event at the 1972 Summer Olympics.
