= Tommy Dunn (boxer) =

English boxer (born 1954)

Personal information
- Nationality: British (English)
- Born: 30 September 1954 (age 72)

Thomas Dunn (born 1954) is a male retired boxer who competed for England.

== Boxing career ==
Dunn was the National Champion in 1973 after winning the prestigious ABA lightweight title, boxing out of the Reading ABC.

He represented England in the light-welterweight (-63.5 Kg) division, at the 1974 British Commonwealth Games in Christchurch, New Zealand.

He turned professional on 25 March 1974 and fought in 36 fights until 1979.
