= Timothy Feruka =

Zambian boxer (1954–2003)

Timothy Feruka (3 May 1954 – 8 December 2003) was a Zambian boxer and coach. Nicknamed Tim the Tiger, he is regarded as a legend in his native Zambia.

The 5'3" (161 cm) 106 lbs (48 kg) Feruka competed in the Men's Light-Flyweight 48 kg category for Zambia at the 1972 Summer Olympics in Munich. He lost against Ethiopian boxer Chanyalev Haile in the first round.

Feruka was the first Zambian to win a gold medal during the All-Africa Games in 1973.

He retired as an amateur in 1976 due to ill health and started coaching.

He died on 8 December 2003. His funeral was subject to controversy when both the National Sports Council of Zambia (NSCZ) and Boxing Board of Control (BBC) failed to attend his burial.
