= Jim Montague =

Irish boxer

Personal information
- Nationality: Irish
- Born: 11 June 1950 (age 74)

Sport
- Sport: Boxing

Jim Montague (born 11 June 1950) is an Irish boxer. He competed in the men's light welterweight event at the 1972 Summer Olympics.
