= Tatu Chionga =

Malawian boxer (born 1944)

Personal information
- Nationality: Malawian
- Born: 1 March 1944 (age 82)

Sport
- Sport: Boxing

Tatu Chionga (born 1 March 1944) is a Malawian boxer. He competed in the men's lightweight event at the 1972 Summer Olympics.
