= Alan Richardson (boxer) =

English boxer

Personal information
- Nationality: British (English)
- Born: 4 November 1948 (age 77) Fitzwilliam, England
- Weight: featherweight

Boxing career

Boxing record
- Total fights: 27
- Wins: 17
- Win by KO: 5
- Losses: 9
- Draws: 1
- No contests: 0
Medal record
Representing England
Men's boxing
EuBC Amateur Championships
| Bronze medal – third place | 1969 | featherweight |
British Commonwealth Games
| Bronze medal – third place | 1970 | featherweight |

Alan Richardson (born 4 November 1948) is an English amateur and professional featherweight boxer of the 1960s, and 1970s, he was the 1969 Amateur Boxing Association of England featherweight boxing champion, won bronze medals in both the 1969 European Amateur Boxing Championships and the 1970 British Commonwealth Games, and was British professional featherweight boxing champion from Tuesday 15 March 1977 to Thursday 20 April 1978.

== Background ==
Allan Richardson was born in Fitzwilliam, West Riding of Yorkshire, as of 2018 he works as a lorry driver, and he lives in Thurnscoe, South Yorkshire.

== Boxing career ==
=== Amateur ===
Richardson initially trained in Hemsworth, and then at the White Rose Boys' Club Amateur Boxing Club in Wakefield, and won the Amateur Boxing Association of England (ABAE) Junior Class-B title against Brian Harding (St George's Stepney ABC) at RAF Stanmore Park Sports Arena, Middlesex on Thursday 27 May 1965, was runner-up for the Senior featherweight title against Johnny Cheshire (Repton ABC) at the 81st ABAE National Championship at Empire Pool and Sports Arena, Wembley on Friday 10 May 1968, won the Senior featherweight title against Eddie Pritchard (Llangefni ABC) at the 82nd ABAE National Championship at Empire Pool and Sports Arena, Wembley on Friday 9 May 1969, won a bronze medal losing on points in the semi-final to eventual gold medalist László Orbán at featherweight in the 1969 European Amateur Boxing Championships at Bucharest, Romania on Sunday 8 June 1969.

He represented England and won a bronze medal, losing on points in the semi-final to eventual gold medalist Philip Waruinge at featherweight in the 1970 British Commonwealth Games, at Edinburgh on 22 July 1970.

=== Professional ===
Managed by Trevor Callaghan, Alan Richardson's first professional boxing bout was a victory over Abu Arrow on Tuesday 30 November 1971, this was followed by fights including; victory over Bingo Crooks (Midlands (England) Area lightweight champion), defeat by, and victory over Billy Hardacre challenging for the British Boxing Board of Control Central (England) Area featherweight title, draw with Billy Waith (Welsh Area welterweight champion, and British welterweight challenger), defeat by Barry Harris challenging for the Central (England) Area featherweight title, defeat by Evan Armstrong challenging for the British featherweight, and British Commonwealth featherweight titles, defeat by Fernand Roelands (EBU European lightweight champion) at Bruges, Belgium, victory over John Mitchell (Scottish Area featherweight challenger), victory over Ray Ross (Northern Ireland Area lightweight challenger, Irish light welterweight challenger, and Northern Ireland Area light welterweight challenger), Gerry Duffy (Scottish Area featherweight champion), victory over Vernon Sollas (EBU European featherweight challenger) challenging for the British featherweight title, victory over Les Pickett (Welsh Area featherweight champion) defending the British featherweight title, defeat by Eddie Ndukwu challenging for the British Commonwealth featherweight title at Lagos National Stadium, Nigeria, defeat by Dave Needham (British bantamweight champion, and EBU European bantamweight Challenger, and British Commonwealth featherweight Challenger) defending the British featherweight title, Alan Richardson's final professional bout was a defeat by Les Pickett on Tuesday 3 October 1978.

== Note ==
The birth registration index detailed on FreeBMD states that Richardson's given name is Allan, i.e. two-els, whereas all other references state Alan. i.e. one-el.
