= Asen Nikolov (boxer) =

Bulgarian boxer

Personal information
- Nationality: Bulgarian
- Born: 28 July 1951 (age 73)

Sport
- Sport: Boxing

Asen Nikolov (born 28 July 1951) is a Bulgarian boxer. He competed in the men's light flyweight event at the 1972 Summer Olympics.
