= David Attan =

Kenyan boxer (born 1948)

Personal information
- Nationality: Kenyan
- Born: 15 December 1948 (age 76)

Sport
- Sport: Boxing

David Attan (born 15 December 1948) is a Kenyan boxer. He competed in the men's light middleweight event at the 1972 Summer Olympics.
