= Shekie Kongo =

Malawian boxer (born 1949)

Personal information
- Nationality: Malawian
- Born: 13 June 1949 (age 77)
- Height: 1.47 m (4 ft 10 in)
- Weight: 48 kg (106 lb)

Sport
- Sport: Boxing
- Weight class: Light flyweight

Shekie Kongo (born 13 June 1949) is a Malawian former boxer.

Shekie competed in the light flyweight event at the 1972 Summer Olympics in Munich. Standing under five feet tall, he was the smallest man in the boxing tournament and a favourite with the crowd. Kongo was given a bye in the first round, but was defeated in round two by his Ethiopian opponent Chanyalev Haile.
