= Bakari Seleman =

Tanzanian boxer (born 1955)

Personal information
- Nationality: Tanzanian
- Born: 5 June 1955 (age 69)

Sport
- Sport: Boxing

Bakari Seleman (born 5 June 1955) is a Tanzanian boxer. He competed in the men's light flyweight event at the 1972 Summer Olympics. Seleman also represented Tanzania at the 1974 British Commonwealth Games.
