= Pentti Saarman =

Finnish boxer (1941–2021)

Personal information
- Nationality: Finnish
- Born: 28 July 1941; Vanaja, Finland
- Died: 23 June 2021 (aged 79)

Sport
- Sport: Boxing

Pentti Saarman (28 July 1941 – 23 June 2021) was a Finnish boxer. He competed in the men's light welterweight event at the 1972 Summer Olympics.
