= Laudiel Negrón =

Puerto Rican boxer

Personal information
- Nationality: Puerto Rican
- Born: September 20, 1952 Aguas Buenas, Puerto Rico
- Died: October 15, 2021 (aged 69)

Sport
- Sport: Boxing

Laudiel Negrón (born 20 September 1952) is a Puerto Rican boxer. He competed in the men's light welterweight event at the 1972 Summer Olympics.
