= Kim U-gil =

North Korean boxer (born 1949)

- Hangul: 김우길
- RR: Gim Ugil
- MR: Kim Ugil

Olympic medal record

Men's boxing

Representing North Korea
Silver medal – second place	1972 Munich	Light Flyweight

Asian Games
Bronze medal – third place	1974 Tehran	Light Flyweight

Kim U-gil (Korean: 김우길; born 17 October 1949) is a former boxer from North Korea who won the silver medal in the light flyweight division (– 48 kg) at the 1972 Summer Olympics in Munich, West Germany. In the final he was defeated by Hungary's György Gedó on points (5:0).
