= Adeyemi Abayomi =

Nigerian boxer (1947–2021)

Personal information
- Nationality: Nigerian
- Born: 22 April 1941
- Died: 2021 (aged 73–74)
- Height: 1.70 m (5 ft 7 in)
- Weight: 51 kg (112 lb)

Sport
- Sport: Boxing

Adeyemi Abayomi Isaac (22 April 1941 – 2021) was a Nigerian boxer. He competed in the men's lightweight division at the 1972 Summer Olympics.
