= Kyoji Tan =

Japanese historian

Kyoji Tan (丹 喬二, Tan Kyōji, 1937 – January 3, 2011) was a Japanese historian. He specialized in Song dynasty history.

== Education and career ==
He graduated from Tokyo University of Education, and later served as a professor at Nihon University until 2007 .
