= Benson Masanda =

Ugandan former amateur boxer

Medal record

Men's amateur boxing

Representing Uganda

British Commonwealth Games
Gold medal – first place	1970 Edinburgh	Heavyweight (91 kg)
Bronze medal – third place	1974 Christchurch	Heavyweight (91 kg)

Benson Masanda is a Ugandan former amateur boxer who won a gold medal at the 1970 British Commonwealth Games and bronze at the 1974 edition.
