= Andrew Kajjo =

Ugandan boxer

Personal information
- Nationality: Ugandan
- Born: 4 September 1948 (age 78) Kampala, Uganda

Sport
- Sport: Boxing

Andrew Kajjo (born 4 September 1948) is a Ugandan boxer. He competed in the men's welterweight event at the 1968 Summer Olympics.

Kajjo's most significant career highlight came during the 1972 Munich Olympics, where he represented Uganda and showcased his talent on a global stage.
