= Howard Hayes (boxer) =

English boxer (born 1949)

Personal information
- Nationality: British (English)
- Born: 27 November 1949 Doncaster, England

Sport
- Sport: Boxing
- Event: Lightweight
- Club: Doncaster Plant Works BC

Howard Hayes (born 27 November 1949) is a male former boxer who competed for England. He was a member of the Doncaster Plant Works Boxing Club.

== Biography ==
Hayes won the 1969 Amateur Boxing Association British lightweight title, when boxing out of the Plant Works ABC.

He represented the England team at the 1970 British Commonwealth Games in Edinburgh, Scotland, where he participated in the -60 kg lightweight division.

He turned professional on 3 November 1970 and fought in 21 fights until 1974.
