= Surapong Sripirom =

Thai boxer

Personal information
- Nationality: Thai
- Born: 31 March 1949 (age 76)

Sport
- Sport: Boxing

Surapong Sripirom (born 31 March 1949) is a Thai boxer. He competed in the men's light flyweight event at the 1972 Summer Olympics.
