= Roy Johnson (boxer) =

Bermudian boxer (1948–2024)

Personal information
- Nationality: Bermudian
- Born: 2 July 1948 Bermuda
- Died: 13 February 2024 (aged 75) Bermuda

Sport
- Sport: Boxing

Roy Johnson (2 July 1948 – 13 February 2024) was a Bermudian boxer. He competed in the men's light welterweight event at the 1972 Summer Olympics. Johnson died in Bermuda in February 2024, at the age of 75.
