= Said Ahmed El-Ashry =

Egyptian boxer (born 1949)

Personal information
- Nationality: Egyptian
- Born: 15 August 1949 (age 77) Alexandria, Egypt

Sport
- Sport: Boxing

Said Ahmed El-Ashry (born 15 August 1949) is an Egyptian boxer. He competed at the 1972 Summer Olympics and the 1976 Summer Olympics.
