= Emma Ankudey =

Ghanaian boxer

Personal information
- Full name: Emma Flash Ankudey
- Nationality: Ghanaian
- Born: 10 September 1943 (age 82)
- Height: 1.70 m (5 ft 7 in)
- Weight: 67 kg (148 lb)

Sport
- Sport: Boxing
Medal record
Men's Boxing
Representing Ghana
Commonwealth Games
Gold medal – first place	1970 Edinburgh	Welterweight

Emma Flash Ankudey (born 10 September 1943) is a Ghanaian former amateur boxer.

Ankudey won a gold medal in the welterweight division of the boxing at the 1970 British Commonwealth Games, which were held in Edinburgh.

At the 1972 Summer Olympics, Ankudey represented Ghana in the welterweight competition. He was eliminated in round two by Mongolia's Damdinjavyn Bandi.
