= Robert Mwakosya =

Tanzanian boxer (born 1952)

Personal information
- Nationality: Tanzanian
- Born: 12 September 1952 (age 73)

Sport
- Sport: Boxing

Robert David Mwakosya (born 12 September 1952) was a Tanzanian boxer. He competed in the men's light welterweight event at the 1972 Summer Olympics.
