= Graham Moughton =

English boxer

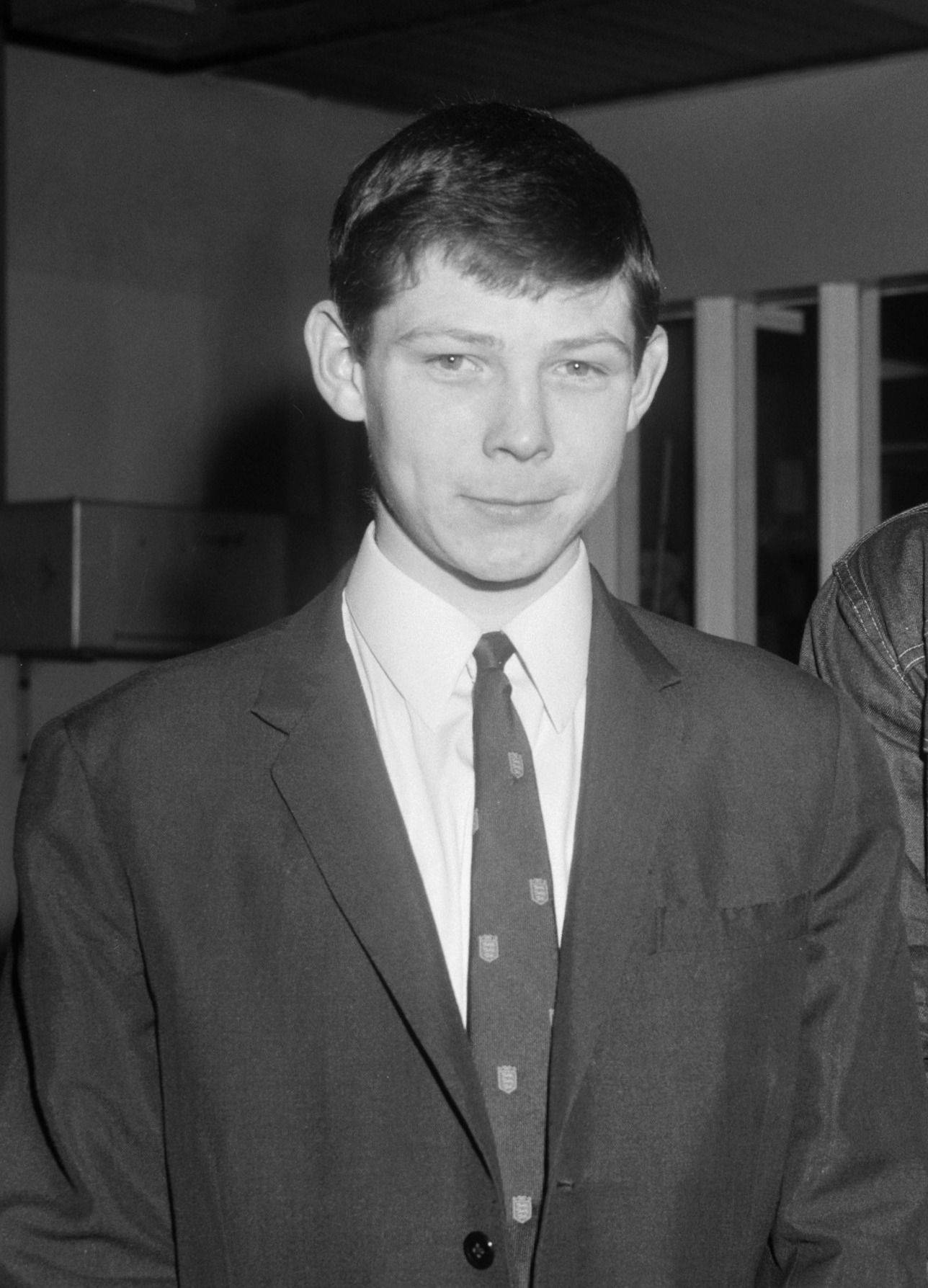
- Graham Moughton in 1966

Personal information
- Born: 2 December 1948 (age 77) Ilford, England
- Height: 1.73 m (5 ft 8 in)
- Weight: 61 kg (134 lb)

Sport
- Sport: Boxing
- Club: Repton ABC, London

Graham Moughton (born 2 December 1948) is a retired English amateur boxer. He captained the British Olympic boxing team representing Repton ABC and competed at the 1972 Summer Olympics in the light-welterweight division, but was eliminated in the third bout. On 13 January 1973 Graham boxed in a tournament against Sugar Ray Leonard losing a close 2-1 split decision. The same year Moughton represented Bermuda at the world championships in Cuba. Overall Moughton would box 304 bouts, representing England on 35 occasions and is the only boxer to represent 3 countries. England (35) 1972 Olympics, Bermuda (15) 1973 World Championships and a Denmark select (1) where he would lose on a cut eye to future world champion Ayube Kaluli of Uganda.
