= Salvador García (boxer) =

Mexican boxer (born 1953)

Personal information
- Nationality: Mexican
- Born: 18 November 1953 (age 72)

Sport
- Sport: Boxing
Medal record
Men's amateur boxing
Representing Mexico
Pan American Games
Bronze medal – third place	1971 Cali	Light flyweight

Salvador García (born 18 November 1953) is a Mexican boxer. He competed in the men's light flyweight event at the 1972 Summer Olympics.
