= Kyōji Watanabe =

Japanese historian, literary critic and essayist (1930–2022)

Kyoji Watanabe
- 渡辺京二
- Watanabe in 1991
- Born: 1 August 1930; Kyoto, Empire of Japan
- Died: 25 December 2022 (aged 92); Kumamoto, Japan

Kyoji Watanabe (Japanese: 渡辺京二; 1 August 1930 – 25 December 2022) was a Japanese historian, literary critic and essayist.

== Life and career ==
Born in Kyoto, Watanabe grew up between Kumamoto and the Chinese city of Dalian. He graduated in sociology at the Hosei University in Tokyo and in 1965 he founded the literary magazine Kumamoto Fudoki, in which Michiko Ishimure first published the novel Paradise in the Sea of Sorrow in a serialized format. In 1969 he founded the 'Association to Denounce Minamata Disease', which had a key role in raising public awareness of the disease and negotiating for compensation with the chemical company responsible for the disease Chisso. His best-known work is Remnants of Days Past (逝きし世の面影; Yukishi yo no omokage), a look at the Edo period from the perspective of how modernization actually worsened the quality of people's lives.

During his career Watanabe received various awards and honors, notably the Mainichi Publishing Culture Award in 1979 and the Yomiuri Prize in the "criticism and biography" category in 2006.

On 25 December 2022, Watanabe died at his home in Kumamoto, at the age of 92.
