= Carl Speare =

Boxer who competed for England

Personal information
- Nationality: England
- Born: 17 December 1952 Liverpool
- Died: 20 April 2009 (aged 56)
Medal record
Boxing
Representing England
Commonwealth Games
Bronze medal – third place	1974 Christchurch	middleweight

Carl Alexander Speare (1952-2009), was a male boxer who competed for England.

== Boxing career ==
Speare represented England and won a bronze medal in the middleweight (-73 Kg) division, at the 1974 British Commonwealth Games in Christchurch, New Zealand.

He turned professional on 22 April 1974 and fought in 17 fights until 1978.
