= Volodymyr Ivanov (boxer) =

Belarusian boxer (1936–2021)

Personal information
- Nationality: Belarusian
- Born: 8 February 1936; Gomel, Belarusian SSR, Soviet Union
- Died: 21 August 2021 (aged 85)

Sport
- Sport: Boxing

Volodymyr Ivanov (8 February 1936 – 21 August 2021) was a Belarusian boxer. He competed in the men's light flyweight event at the 1972 Summer Olympics, representing the Soviet Union.
