= Dennis Talbot =

Australian boxer

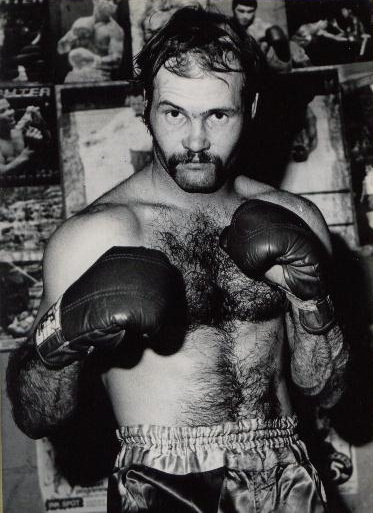
- After training, 2 days before winning the Australasian title 1980

Personal information
- Nickname: The Mudgee Mauler
- Nationality: (Australia) Australian
- Born: Dennis Alan Talbot; 18 April 1954 (age 72) Rylstone, New South Wales, Australia
- Height: 1.57 m (5 ft 2 in)

Boxing career
- Stance: Southpaw

Boxing record
- Total fights: 52 (professional)
- Wins: 29
- Win by KO: 8
- Losses: 22
- Draws: 1

Dennis Alan Talbot (born 18 April 1954) is an Australian former boxer. His boxing career started from Mudgee in June 1969 and went on for a period of 15 years. He retired in April 1984 after successfully defending his lightweight title against Brett Young.

Dennis traveled to every part of Australia and visited many parts around the World (New Caledonia, Fiji, Bahrain, Italy, Marreia Island, Singapore, Austria, American Samoa, Tahiti, Germany, The Philippines and New Zealand).

He met many celebrities, including; Prince Philip, Princess Anne, Raymond Burr, Mick Jagger, Marlon Brando, Johnny Weissmuller, Ferdinand Marcos, Lionel Rose, Johnny Famechon and Jimmy Carruthers.

Dennis entered the ring against 4 World Champions.

He fought over 100 fights including 30 title fights, with 85% in victories, 50% KO's, 26 KO's in under 2 rounds, 3 KO's under 1 round and 2 KO's under 30 seconds of the first round.

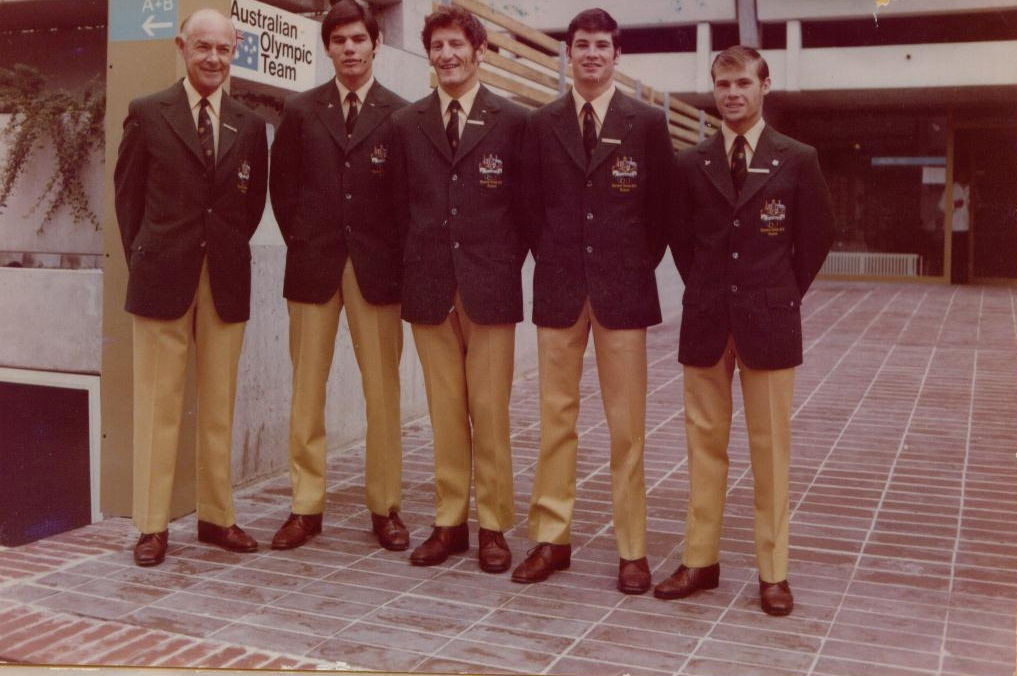
Dennis Talbot (far right) with the Australian Olympic Boxing Team, Munich, 1972

== Titles held 1970-1972 ==
- State Schoolboys (August 1970)
- State Novice Titles (1970)
- State Open Senior Titles (1971)
- Australian Titles - Adelaide SA (1971)
- Australian Titles - Perth W.A. (1972)
- Pacific Games Tahiti (1972)

These titles were never lost; he retired with all titles.

== At the 1972 Olympics in Munich ==
He was one of four boxers selected to represent Australia in 1972 in the Munich Olympics.

- Defeated Francisco Rodríguez (Venezuela) KO 2
- Lost to György Gedó (Hungary) (went on to become gold medalist) 5-0

== Honors ==
He was one of the Australian torch carriers at the 2000 Sydney Olympics.
