= Bantow Srisook =

Thai boxer

Bantow Srisukh
Personal information
- Nationality: Thai
- Born: 30 August 1946 (age 78)

Sport
- Sport: Boxing

Bantow Srisukh (born 30 August 1946) is a Thai boxer. He competed in the men's light welterweight event at the 1972 Summer Olympics.
