= Anatoly Kamnev =

Russian boxer

Personal information
- Nationality: Russian
- Born: 27 November 1948 Moscow, Russian SFSR, Soviet Union
- Died: 10 November 1992 (aged 43) Moscow, Russia

Sport
- Sport: Boxing

Anatoly Petrovich Kamnev (Russian: Анатолий Петрович Камнев; 27 November 1948 – 10 November 1992) was a Russian boxer. He competed in the men's light welterweight event at the 1972 Summer Olympics.

== Death ==
In 1992, Kamnev was on a train and stood up to defend a woman from being robbed, and in the process was stabbed to death by the perpetrator.
