= Colin Flinn =

Retired boxer who competed for England

Personal information
- Nationality: England
- Born: 1953

Colin Flinn (born 1953), is a male retired boxer who competed for England.

== Boxing career ==
Flinn was National Championship runner-up in the prestigious 1973 ABA featherweight Championship, boxing out of Tile Hill ABC.

He was then selected for England in the featherweight (-57 Kg) division, at the 1974 British Commonwealth Games in Christchurch, New Zealand.
