= William Byrne (boxer) =

New Zealand boxer

Medal record

Representing New Zealand

Men's Boxing

Commonwealth Games
Silver medal – second place	1974 Christchurch	Light-Heavyweight

William 'Bill' Byrne is a former boxer from New Zealand. He won the silver medal in the Lightweight (75 – 81 kg) division at the 1974 British Commonwealth Games.

Bill Byrne (Ngāti Porou) won a record ten New Zealand senior boxing titles between 1970 and 1977 - six heavyweight and four light heavyweight titles, winning the heavyweight and light-heavy on the same night on three occasions (1972, 1974 and 1975)
