= Héctor Velásquez =

Chilean boxer (1952–2010)

Héctor Juan Velásquez Vergara
Personal information
- Born: 9 February 1952 Loncoche, Chile
- Died: 18 August 2010 (aged 58) Santiago, Chile
Medal record
Men's Boxing
Representing Chile
Pan American Games
Silver medal – second place	1971 Cali	Light Flyweight

Héctor "Joto" Velásquez Vergara (9 February 1952 – 18 August 2010) was a boxer from Chile. He represented his native country at the 1972 Summer Olympics in Munich, West Germany.

Velásquez won the silver medal in the Men's Light-Flyweight division (– 47 kg) at the 1971 Pan American Games, where the weight division was included for the first time. In the final, he was defeated by Cuba's Rafael Carbonell.
