= Shadrach Odhiambo =

Swedish boxer

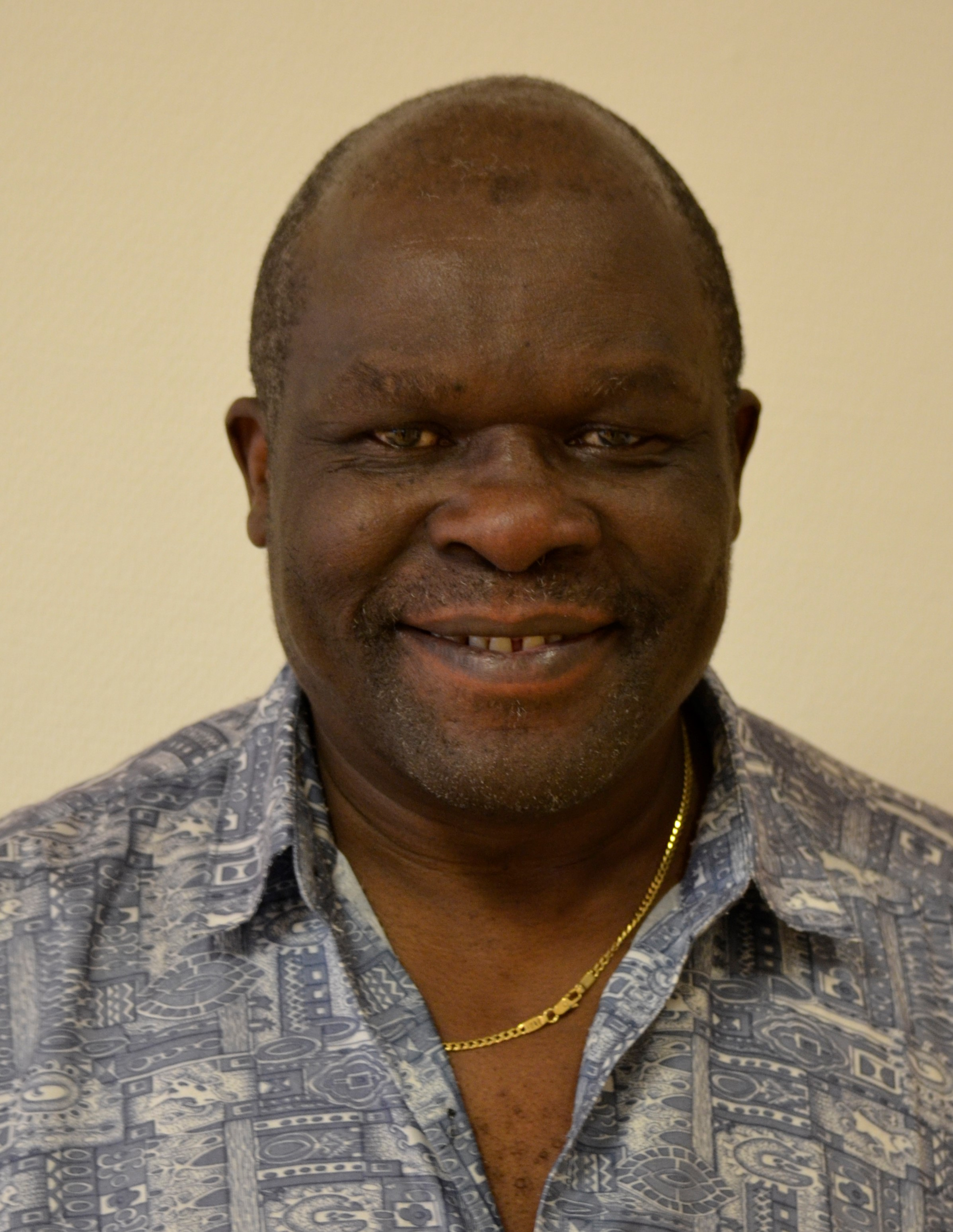

Personal information
- Nationality: Swedish
- Born: 20 October 1954 (age 70); Jinja, Uganda

Sport
- Sport: Boxing

Shadrach Odhiambo (born 20 October 1954) is an Ugandan-born Swedish boxer. He competed at the 1980 Summer Olympics and the 1984 Summer Olympics. At the 1980 Summer Olympics, he defeated Bogdan Gajda of Poland, before losing to Tony Willis of Great Britain.
