= Stephen Muchoki =

Kenyan boxer (born 1956)

Personal information
- Born: 23 December 1956 (age 69)
Medal record
Men's Boxing
Representing Kenya
World Amateur Championships
Gold medal – first place	1978 Belgrade	Light Flyweight
Silver medal – second place	1974 Havana	Light Flyweight
Commonwealth Games
Gold medal – first place	1974 Christchurch	Light Flyweight
Gold medal – first place	1978 Edmonton	Light Flyweight
All-Africa Games
Silver medal – second place	1978 Algiers	Light Flyweight

Stephen ("Steve") Muchoki (born 23 December 1956) is a retired light flyweight boxer from Kenya, who had an excellent career (197 wins, three losses) as an amateur. He won the silver medal at the inaugural 1974 World Amateur Boxing Championships in Havana, Cuba. The same year he captured the title at the 1974 Commonwealth Games in Christchurch, New Zealand.

Muchoki was to represent Kenya at the 1976 Summer Olympics in Montreal, Quebec, Canada, but Kenya choose to boycott. Two years later he won the world title at the 1978 World Amateur Boxing Championships in Belgrade, Yugoslavia, and the gold medal at the 1978 Commonwealth Games once again.
