= Jack Meda =

Canadian boxer (1945–2019)

Jack Michael Meda (November 17, 1945 – September 22, 2019) was a boxer from British Columbia, Canada in the late 1960s and early 1970s. In 1970, he won a bronze medal in the 1970 Commonwealth Games. He was born in New Westminster, British Columbia.

== Boxing tournaments and teams ==
In 1967, Meda made his initial entry into the 1967 BC Golden Gloves tournament and was defeated by Seattle boxer Wesley Craven. After that first setback, Meda, under coach Harold Mann of Prince George's Spruce Capital Boxing Club, came back to win three Golden Glove heavyweight titles in British Columbia, and Canadian titles in 1970 and 1971.

== Later life ==
Meda was inducted into the Prince George Sports Hall of Fame in 2003.

He died in Prince George at the age of 73 from a heart attack on September 22, 2019.
