= Dave Needham (boxer) =

British boxer

Personal information
- Nickname: The Artful Dodger
- Nationality: British (English)
- Born: Dave Needham; 15 August 1951 Nottingham, England.
- Died: 19 September 2008 (aged 57) Chonburi, Thailand
- Weight: Featherweight and Bantamweight

Boxing career
- Stance: Southpaw

Boxing record
- Total fights: 39
- Wins: 30
- Win by KO: 10
- Losses: 8
- Draws: 1
- No contests: 0
Medal record
Men's boxing
Representing England
Commonwealth Games
Gold medal – first place	1970 Edinburgh	Flyweight

Dave Needham (15 August 1951 – 19 September 2008) was a British boxer. He was a Commonwealth Games gold medal winner and one of the few boxers to have held both the BBBC bantamweight and featherweight titles.

== Early life and amateur career ==
Needham was born in Nottingham and attended Cottesmore School. He trained at the Nottingham Boxing School in Radford.

Needham won the 1969 and 1970 Amateur Boxing Association British flyweight title, when boxing out of the Nottingham School of Boxing ABC. He represented England and won a gold medal in the flyweight division, at the 1970 British Commonwealth Games in Edinburgh, Scotland. defeating Uganda's Leo Rwabwogo in the final.

== Professional career ==
Needham's first professional fight was on 25 January 1971 when he fought Jimmy Killeen.

His first title fight was on 10 December 1974 at the former Nottingham ice rink, when he had a points win over Paddy Maguire and became the British bantamweight champion.

He lost the bantamweight title on 20 October 1975 at Grosvenor House (World Sporting Club), Mayfair on a technical knockout (TKO) to the same Paddy Maguire.

On 20 April 1978 at the World Sporting Club, Piccadilly. Needham won the title of British featherweight champion when he defeated Alan Richardson on points.

On 16 December 1978 in Leon, Spain, he fought for the EBU featherweight title, but lost on a TKO to Roberto Castanon.

Needham lost the featherweight title on 6 November 1979 at the Royal Albert Hall when he was defeated by Pat Cowdell on points.

His last fight was on 29 May 1979 at Wolverhampton Civic Hall against Pat Cowdell for the British featherweight title. Cowdell won on a TKO.

== Retirement ==
Needham retired aged 29 in 1980, after becoming disillusioned with the sport. He went on to run a motorcycle dealership with his brother.
He spent the last couple of years of his life in Thailand. Needham died in Chonburi hospital from liver problems. He was 57.

== See also ==
- List of British bantamweight boxing champions
- List of British featherweight boxing champions
