= Alexandru Turei =

Romanian boxer (born 1952)

Alexandru Turei (born August 7, 1952, in Cluj-Napoca) is a former light flyweight Romanian boxer who competed in the 1972 Summer Olympics.

He was defeated by Enrique Rodríguez in the first round of Olympic tournament.
