= Kyoji Shinohara =

Japanese boxer

Personal information
- Nationality: Japanese
- Born: 12 August 1949 (age 75)

Sport
- Sport: Boxing

Kyoji Shinohara (篠原 恭二, Shinohara Kyōji, born 12 August 1949) is a Japanese boxer. He competed in the men's light welterweight event at the 1972 Summer Olympics.
