= Deogratias Musoke =

Ugandan boxer

Personal information
- Nationality: Ugandan
- Born: 20 July 1949 (age 75)

Sport
- Sport: Boxing

Deogratias Musoke (born 20 July 1949) is a Ugandan boxer. He competed in the men's featherweight event at the 1972 Summer Olympics.
