= Rafael Carbonell =

Cuban boxer (born 1943)

Personal information
- Full name: Rafael Carbonell Carrion
- Nationality: Cuban
- Born: November 25, 1943 (age 82) Oriente, Ciudad de la Habana
- Height: 1.60 m (5 ft 3 in)
- Weight: 48 kg (106 lb)

Sport
- Sport: Boxing
- Weight class: Light Flyweight
Medal record
Pan American Games
Gold medal – first place	1971 Cali	Light Flyweight

Rafael Carbonell Carrion (born November 25, 1943, in Oriente, Ciudad de la Habana) is a retired boxer from Cuba, who represented his native country in three consecutive Summer Olympics, starting in 1964.

Carbonell won the gold medal in the men's light-flyweight (– 48 kg) division at the 1971 Pan American Games, where the weight division was included for the first time.

== 1964 Olympic record ==
Below are the results of Rafael Carbonell, a Cuban flyweight boxer who competed at the 1964 Tokyo Olympics:

- Round of 32: lost to John McCafferty (Ireland) by decision, 0-5
