= Zvonimir Vujin =

Serbian boxer (1943–2019)

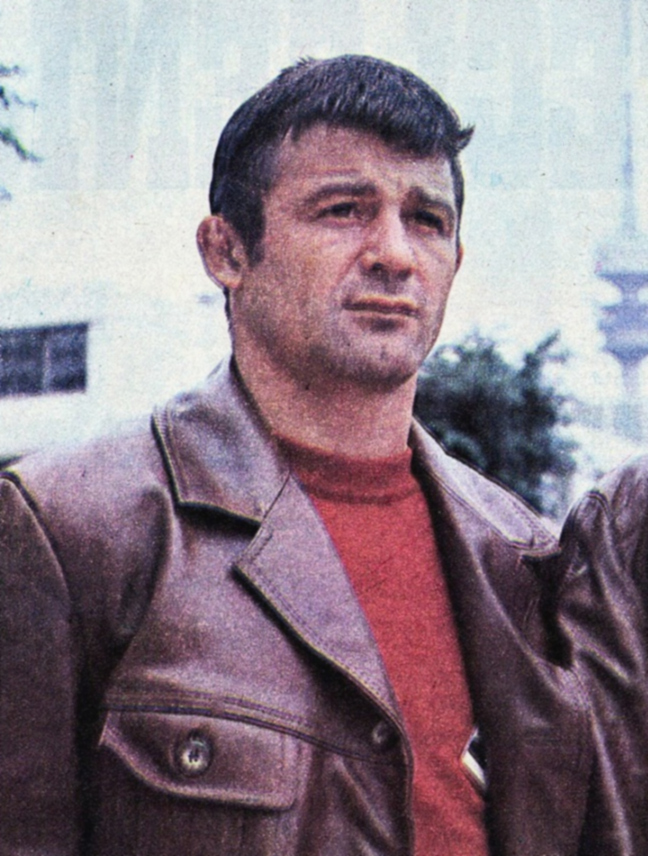
- Vujin in 1972

Personal information
- Born: 23 July 1943 Great Bečkerek, German-occupied Serbia
- Died: 8 December 2019 (aged 76) Zrenjanin, Serbia
- Height: 167 cm (5 ft 6 in)

Sport
- Sport: Boxing
- Club: BK Banat Zrenjanin
Medal record
Representing Yugoslavia
Olympic Games
Bronze medal – third place	1968 Mexico	-60 kg
Bronze medal – third place	1972 Munich	-63.5 kg
European Championships
Silver medal – second place	1967 Rome	-60 kg
Mediterranean Games
Bronze medal – third place	1963 Naples	-57 kg
Gold medal – first place	1967 Tunis	-60 kg

Zvonimir "Zvonko" Vujin (23 July 1943 – 8 December 2019) was a Serbian amateur boxer. He competed in the 1968 and 1972 Olympics for Yugoslavia and won bronze medals on both occasions. In 1967 he won a silver medal at the European championships and a gold at the Mediterranean Games. He died on 8 December 2019 in his hometown, Zrenjanin.

== 1968 Olympic results ==
Below is the Olympic record of Zvonimir Vujin, a Yugoslavian lightweight boxer who competed at the 1968 Mexico City Olympics:

- Round of 64: bye
- Round of 32: defeated Peter Rieger (East Germany) by decision, 3–2
- Round of 16: defeated Valery Belousov (Soviet Union) by decision, 5–0
- Quarterfinal: defeated Luis Minami (Peru) by decision, 5–0
- Semifinal: lost to Josef Grudzien (Poland) by decision, 0–5 (was awarded bronze medal)

== 1972 Olympic results ==
Below is the Olympic record of Zvonimir Vujin, a Yugoslavian light welterweight boxer who competed at the 1972 Munich Olympics:

- Round of 32: defeated Robert Mwakosya (Tanzania) by a second-round TKO
- Round of 16: defeated Sodnom Gombo (Mongolia) by decision, 3–2
- Quarterfinal: defeated Graham Moughton (Great Britain) by decision, 5–0
- Semifinal: lost to Ray Seales (United States) by decision, 0–5 (was awarded bronze medal)
