= James Odwori =

Ugandan boxer (born 1951)

Personal information
- Nationality: Ugandan
- Born: 23 October 1951 (age 73)

Sport
- Sport: Boxing

James Odwori (born 23 October 1951) is a Ugandan boxer. He competed in the men's light flyweight event at the 1972 Summer Olympics.
