= Michael Abrams (boxer) =

English boxer (born 1949)

Micky Abrams
Personal information
- Nicknames: (Mickey, Micky)
- Nationality: British (English)
- Born: 27 September 1949 (age 76) London, England
- Weight: Light-flyweight

Boxing career
- Stance: Orthodox
Medal record
Men's Boxing
Representing England
Commonwealth Games
Bronze medal – third place	1970 Edinburgh	Light Flyweight

Michael Abrams (born 27 September 1949) is an English former amateur and Commonwealth Games light-flyweight boxer. He fought as Mickey Abrams.

== Early career ==
Mickey was a promising boxer from a very early age becoming the Southwest and London schoolboy champion in 1964, and was also the national runner up that year at the 6 st 3 lb division. The following year he became the Junior ABA Southwest and London champion in the class A division, also becoming the national runner up that year.

He did well at the senior ABA competition of 1969/70 at the then "Flyweight" division, before winning the national ABA title for the next 3 years running at Light-Flyweight.

He represented England and won a bronze medal in the light-flyweight category, at the 1970 British Commonwealth Games in Edinburgh, Scotland.

He captained the 1971 Madrid European games, won a Pre-Olympic silver for the 1972 Munich Olympics as well as captaining for the 1973 European games in Belgrade and also the 1974 British Commonwealth Games in Christchurch, New Zealand.

He also had great success in a couple of tours of America, winning 3 fights at the Ohio State fair, Indianapolis and the New Jersey State fair in an ABA tour of 1970, and fought in Madison Square Garden in 1973 in a USA vs the ABA tour. On one of these tours he also met and became good friends with Dustin Hoffman.

== Amateur career ==
Abrams was an amateur boxer for Battersea Amateur Boxing Club, and gained the following ABA titles:

- ABA Light-flyweight Champion (48 kg) - 1971
- ABA Light-flyweight Champion (48 kg) - 1972
- ABA Light-flyweight Champion (48 kg) - 1973

== Personal life ==
Mickey lives in Battersea with his partner Valerie and his young daughter Valentine. He was a school governor at his daughter's school (Wix Primary), which is the same school that he attended.
