= Chanyalew Haile =

Ethiopian boxer (born 1949)

Personal information
- Nationality: Ethiopian
- Born: 20 November 1949 (age 75)

Sport
- Sport: Boxing

Chanyalew Haile (born 20 November 1949) is an Ethiopian boxer. He competed in the men's light flyweight event at the 1972 Summer Olympics.
