= Joe Martey =

Ghanaian boxer

Personal information
- Nationality: Ghanaian
- Born: 23 June 1944 (age 80); Aflao, Ghana

Sport
- Sport: Boxing

Joe Martey (born 23 June 1944) is a Ghanaian boxer. He competed in the men's lightweight event at the 1968 Summer Olympics. At the 1968 Summer Olympics, he lost to Enzo Petriglia of Italy.
