= Mohamed Muruli =

Ugandan boxer

Personal information
- Born: 13 July 1947 Kabarole, Uganda
- Died: 1995 (aged 47–48)
Medal record
Men's Boxing
Representing Uganda
British Commonwealth Games
Gold medal – first place	1970 Edinburgh	Light Welterweight
Gold medal – first place	1974 Christchurch	Welterweight

Mohamed Muruli (13 July 1947 – 1995) was a Ugandan boxer. He was born in Kichwamba, Kabarole District, Uganda, and died in 1995 in Fort Portal in Kabarole District. Muruli competed at the 1968 Summer Olympics in Mexico City, where he reached the quarterfinal in the lightweight class, and in the 1972 Summer Olympics in Munich, as a light welterweight.
