= List of Commonwealth Games medallists in boxing =

This is the complete list of Commonwealth Games medallists in boxing from 1930 to 2014.

== Men's ==
=== Light flyweight ===
Event	Gold	Silver	Bronze
1970	James Odwori (UGA)	Anthony Davies (WAL)	P.J. Butterfield (AUS)
1970	James Odwori (UGA)	Anthony Davies (WAL)	Michael Abrams (ENG)
1974	Stephen Muchoki (KEN)	James Odwori (UGA)	Syed Abdul Kadir (SIN)
1974	Stephen Muchoki (KEN)	James Odwori (UGA)	John Bambrick (SCO)
1978	Stephen Muchoki (KEN)	Francis Kabala (ZAM)	Birender Thapa (IND)
1978	Stephen Muchoki (KEN)	Francis Kabala (ZAM)	Kid Jumalia (GHA)
1982	Abraham Wachire (KEN)	John Lyon (ENG)	Lucky Siame (ZAM)
1982	Abraham Wachire (KEN)	John Lyon (ENG)	Leonard Makhanya (SWZ)
1986	Scotty Olson (CAN)	Mark Epton (ENG)	Johnston Todd (NIR); Wilson Docherty (SCO)
1990	Justin Juuko (UGA)	Abdurahaman Ramadhani (KEN)	Domenic Figliomeni (CAN); Dharmendra Singh Yadav (IND)
1994	Abdurahaman Ramadhani (KEN)	Victor Kasote (ZAM)	Birju Sah (IND); Domenic Figliomeni (CAN)
1998	Sapok Biki (MAS)	Moses Kinyua (KEN)	Boudik Kazanijian (CYP); Gary Jones (ENG)
2002	Mohammed Ali Qamar (IND)	Darran Langley (ENG)	Taoreed Ajabe (NGR)
2002	Mohammed Ali Qamar (IND)	Darran Langley (ENG)	Zamzai Azizi Mohamed (MAS)
2006	Japhet Uutoni (NAM)	Darran Langley (ENG)	Simanga Shiba (SWZ)
2006	Japhet Uutoni (NAM)	Darran Langley (ENG)	Mo Nasir (WAL)
2010	Paddy Barnes (NIR)	Japhet Uutoni (NAM)	Muhammad Waseem (PAK)
2010	Paddy Barnes (NIR)	Japhet Uutoni (NAM)	Amandeep Singh (IND)
2014	Paddy Barnes (NIR)	Devendro Laishram (IND)	Ashley Williams (WAL)
2014	Paddy Barnes (NIR)	Devendro Laishram (IND)	Fazil Juma Kaggwa (UGA)

=== Flyweight ===
Event	Gold	Silver	Bronze
1930	Jacob Smith (SAF)	Thomas Pardoe (ENG)	Ross Galloway (CAN)
1934	Pat Palmer (ENG)	Maxie Berger (CAN)	Jackie Pottinger (WAL)
1938	(South Africa) Johnny Joubert (SAF)	Joe Gagnon (CAN)	Hugh Cameron (SCO)
1950	Hugh Riley (SCO)	(Dominion of Ceylon) K. Edwin (CEY)	(South Africa) Marcus Temple (SAF)
1954	Dick Currie (SCO)	Abe Bekker (NRH)	Warner Batchelor (AUS)
1958	Jackie Brown (SCO)	Tommy Bache (ENG)	Peter Lavery (NIR)
1958	Jackie Brown (SCO)	Tommy Bache (ENG)	Donald Braithwaite (WAL)
1962	Bobby Mallon (SCO)	Cassis Aryee (GHA)	Philip Waruinge (KEN)
1962	Bobby Mallon (SCO)	Cassis Aryee (GHA)	Mike Pye (ENG)
1966	Sulley Shittu (GHA)	Kenneth Campbell (JAM)	Frank Scott (CAN); John Rakowski (AUS)
1970	Dave Needham (ENG)	Leo Rwabwogo (UGA)	Alex McHugh (SCO)
1970	Dave Needham (ENG)	Leo Rwabwogo (UGA)	Davy Larmour (NIR)
1974	(Northern Ireland) Davy Larmour	(India) Chander Narayanan	(Nigeria) Saliu Ishola
1974	(Northern Ireland) Davy Larmour	(India) Chander Narayanan	(Uganda) John Byaruhanga
1978	Michael Irungu (KEN)	Ian Clyde (CAN)	Peter Wighton (AUS)
1978	Michael Irungu (KEN)	Ian Clyde (CAN)	Hugh Russell (NIR)
1982	Michael Mutua (KEN)	Joseph Kelly (SCO)	Grant Richards (AUS)
1982	Michael Mutua (KEN)	Joseph Kelly (SCO)	Albert Musankabala (ZAM)
1986	John Lyon (ENG)	Leonard Makhanya (SWZ)	Kerry Webber (WAL); Steve Beaupré (CAN)
1990	Wayne McCullough (NIR)	Nokuthula Tshabangu (ZIM)	Born Siwakwi (ZAM); Maurice Maina (KEN)
1994	Paul Shepherd (SCO)	Duncan Karanja (KEN)	Bornface Makuka (ZAM); Danny Costello (ENG)
1998	Richard Sunee (MRI)	Liam Cunningham (NIR)	Phumzile Matyhila (RSA); Jackson Asiku (UGA)
2002	Kennedy Kanyanta (ZAM)	Lechedzani Luza (BOT)	Sébastien Gauthier (CAN)
2002	Kennedy Kanyanta (ZAM)	Lechedzani Luza (BOT)	Nzimeni Msutu (RSA)
2006	Don Broadhurst (ENG)	Jackson Chauke (RSA)	Jitender Kumar (IND)
2006	Don Broadhurst (ENG)	Jackson Chauke (RSA)	Martin Mubiru (UGA)
2010	Suranjoy Singh (IND)	Benson Gicharu (KEN)	Oteng Oteng (BOT)
2010	Suranjoy Singh (IND)	Benson Gicharu (KEN)	Haroon Khan (PAK)
2014 (52 kg)	Andrew Moloney (AUS)	Muhammad Waseem (PAK)	Abdul Omar (GHA)
2014 (52 kg)	Andrew Moloney (AUS)	Muhammad Waseem (PAK)	Reece McFadden (SCO)

=== Bantamweight ===
Event	Gold	Silver	Bronze
1930	Harry Mizler (ENG)	John Keller (CAN)	Tommy Holt (SCO)*
1934	Eddie Ryan (ENG)	Albert Barnes (WAL)	Thomas Wells (SCO)
1938	William Butler (ENG)	(South Africa) Hendrik Knoesen (SAF)	Jack Dillon (AUS)
1950	(South Africa) Johnny van Rensburg (SAF)	(Dominion of Ceylon) Albert Perera (CEY)	Len Walters (CAN)
1954	John Smillie (SCO)	Gordon Smith (SRH)	Abubakar Idi Garuba (NGR)
1958	Howard Winstone (WAL)	Oliver "Frankie" Taylor (AUS)	Olfred Owen (SCO); Richard Hanna (NIR)
1962	Jeff Dynevor (AUS)	Sammy Abbey (GHA)	John Sentongo (UGA); Peter Benneyworth (ENG)
1966	Edward Ndukwu (NGA)	Darryl Norwood (AUS)	John Nderu (KEN); Brian Kendall (NZL)
1970	Sulley Shittu (GHA)	Samuel Mbugua (KEN)	Stewart Ogilvie (SCO); Courtney Atherly (GUY)
1974	(England) Patrick Cowdell	(Uganda) Ali Rojo	(Zambia) Newton Chisanga (Kenya) Isaac Maina
1978	Barry McGuigan (NIR)	Tumat Sogolik (PNG)	Douglas Maina (KEN); William Rannelli (CAN)
1982	Joe Orewa (NGR)	Roy Webb (NIR)	Ray Gilbody (ENG); Richard Reilly (AUS)
1986	Sean Murphy (ENG)	Roy Nash (NIR)	Glen Brooks (SCO); John Sollitoe (JER)
1990	Mohammed Sabo (NGR)	Geronimo Bie (CAN)	Justin Chikwanda (ZAM); Wesley Christmas (GUY)
1994	Robbie Peden (AUS)	Spencer Oliver (ENG)	Fred Mutuweta (UGA)
1998	Michael Yomba (TAN)	Herman Ngoudjo (CMR)	Adnan Yusoh (MAS); Andrew Kooner (CAN)
2002	Justin Kane (AUS)	Andrew Kooner (CAN)	Ezekiel Letuka (LES)
2002	Justin Kane (AUS)	Andrew Kooner (CAN)	Mark Moran (ENG)
2006	Akhil Kumar (IND)	Bruno Julie (MRI)	Nestor Bolum (NGR)
2006	Akhil Kumar (IND)	Bruno Julie (MRI)	Mmoloki Nogeng (BOT)
2010	Sean McGoldrick (WAL)	Tirafalo Seoko (BOT)	Nick Okoth (KEN)
2010	Sean McGoldrick (WAL)	Tirafalo Seoko (BOT)	Louis Julie (MRI)
2014	Michael Conlan (NIR)	Qais Ashfaq (ENG)	Sean McGoldrick (WAL)
2014	Michael Conlan (NIR)	Qais Ashfaq (ENG)	Benson Gicharu (KEN)

=== Featherweight ===
Event	Gold	Silver	Bronze
1930	Freddie Meachem (ENG)	Lawrence Stevens (SAF)	Alex Lyons (SCO)
1934	(South Africa) Charles Catterall (SAF)	J. D. Jones (WAL)	(Southern Rhodesia) William Fulton (RHO)
1938	(Dominion of Ceylon) Barney Henricus (CEY)	James Watson (SCO)	Kenneth Moran (NZL)
1950	John Rees (WAL)	(Southern Rhodesia) Andy Verceuil (RHO)	Peter Brander (ENG)
1954	Leonard Leisching (SAF)	John Rees (WAL)	Dave Charnley (ENG)
1958	Wally Taylor (AUS)	John Rees (WAL)	Gert Coetzee (SAF)
1958	Wally Taylor (AUS)	John Rees (WAL)	John McClory (NIR)
1962	John McDermott (SCO)	Ali Juma (KEN)	Turori George (NZL)
1962	John McDermott (SCO)	Ali Juma (KEN)	Ted Stone (AUS)
1966	Philip Waruinge (KEN)	Paddy Maguire (NIR)	Amos Ajoo (GHA); Harold West (JAM)
1970	Philip Waruinge (KEN)	Deogratias Musoke (UGA)	Mir Samar (PAK)
1970	Philip Waruinge (KEN)	Deogratias Musoke (UGA)	Alan Richardson (ENG)
1974	(Nigeria) Edward Ndukwu	(Uganda) Shadrach Odhiambo	(Canada) Dale Anderson
1974	(Nigeria) Edward Ndukwu	(Uganda) Shadrach Odhiambo	(Kenya) Samuel Mbugua
1978	Azumah Nelson (GHA)	John Sichula (ZAM)	Guy Boutin (CAN)
1978	Azumah Nelson (GHA)	John Sichula (ZAM)	Moss O'Brien (ENG)
1982	Peter Konyegwachie (NGR)	Peter Hanlon (ENG)	Rodney Harberger (AUS)
1982	Peter Konyegwachie (NGR)	Peter Hanlon (ENG)	Winfred Kabunda (ZAM)
1986	Billy Downey (CAN)	Peter English (ENG)	Chris Carleton (NIR); Johnny Wallace (NZL)
1990	John Irwin (ENG)	Haji Ally (TAN)	David Gakuha (KEN); Jamie Nicolson (AUS)
1994	Casey Patton (CAN)	Jason Cook (WAL)	Matumla Hassan (TAN); James Swan (AUS)
1998	Alex Arthur (SCO)	Marty O'Donnell (CAN)	Lynch Ipera (PNG); James Swan (AUS)
2002	Haider Ali (PAK)	Som Bahadur Pun (IND)	Benoit Gaudet (CAN)
2002	Haider Ali (PAK)	Som Bahadur Pun (IND)	Joshua Veikko (NAM)
2006	Stephen Smith (ENG)	Mehrullah Lassi (PAK)	Luke Jackson (AUS)
2006	Stephen Smith (ENG)	Mehrullah Lassi (PAK)	Darren Edwards (WAL)

=== Lightweight ===
Event	Gold	Silver	Bronze
1930	James Rolland (SCO)	Cosmos Canzano (CAN)	Albert Love (ENG)
1934	Leonard Cook (AUS)	Frank Taylor (WAL)	Harry Moy (ENG)
1938	Harry Groves (ENG)	Harry Hurst (CAN)	(Southern Rhodesia) William Fulton (RHO)
1950	Ronnie Latham (ENG)	Billy Barber (AUS)	Jim Barnden (NZL)
1954	Piet van Staden (SRH)	Frank McQuillan (SCO)	Brian Cahill (AUS)
1958	Dick McTaggart (SCO)	James Jordan (NIR)	Johnny Cooke (ENG)
1958	Dick McTaggart (SCO)	James Jordan (NIR)	Paddy Donovan (NZL)
1962	Eddie Blay (GHA)	Kesi Odongo (UGA)	Paddy Donovan (NZL)
1962	Eddie Blay (GHA)	Kesi Odongo (UGA)	Brian Whelan (ENG)
1966	Anthony Andeh (NGA)	Ron Thurston (ENG)	Stephen Baraza (KEN); Samuel Lockhart (NIR)
1970	Adeyemi Abayomi (NGR)	John Gillan (SCO)	Tatu Chionga (MAW)
1970	Adeyemi Abayomi (NGR)	John Gillan (SCO)	Moses Mbogwa (KEN)
1974	(Uganda) Ayub Kalule	(Nigeria) Kayin Amah	(India) Muniswamy Venu
1974	(Uganda) Ayub Kalule	(Nigeria) Kayin Amah	(New Zealand) Robert Colley
1978	Gerry Hamill (NIR)	Patrick Waweru (KEN)	Teddy Makofi (ZAM)
1978	Gerry Hamill (NIR)	Patrick Waweru (KEN)	John McAllister (SCO)
1982	Hussein Khalili (KEN)	James McDonnell (ENG)	Brian Tink (AUS)
1982	Hussein Khalili (KEN)	James McDonnell (ENG)	Steve Larrimore (BAH)
1986	Asif Dar (CAN)	Neil Haddock (WAL)	Lyton Mphande (MAW); Joey Jacobs (ENG)
1990	Godfrey Nyakana (UGA)	Justin Rowsell (AUS)	B. Mambeya (TAN); David Anderson (SCO)
1994	Michael Strange (CAN)	Martin Renaghan (NIR)	Kalolo Fiaui (NZL); Arshad Hussain (PAK)
1998	Ray Narh (GHA)	Ali Asghar (PAK)	Andrew McLean (ENG); Giovanni Frontin (MRI)
2002	Jamie Arthur (WAL)	Denis Zimba (ZAM)	Gilbert Khunwane (BOT)
2002	Jamie Arthur (WAL)	Denis Zimba (ZAM)	Andy Morris (ENG)
2006	Frankie Gavin (ENG)	Giovanni Frontin (MRI)	Charles Menya (KEN)
2006	Frankie Gavin (ENG)	Giovanni Frontin (MRI)	Leonardo Zappavigna (AUS)
2010	Thomas Stalker (ENG)	Josh Taylor (SCO)	Jai Bhagwan (IND)
2010	Thomas Stalker (ENG)	Josh Taylor (SCO)	Lomalito Moala (TON)
2014	Charlie Flynn (SCO)	Joe Fitzpatrick (NIR)	Joseph Cordina (WAL)
2014	Charlie Flynn (SCO)	Joe Fitzpatrick (NIR)	Michael Alexander (TRI)

=== Light welterweight ===
Event	Gold	Silver	Bronze
1954	Mickey Bergin (CAN)	Aubrey Harris (SRH)	Des Duguid (AUS)
1958	Henry Loubscher (SAF)	Robert Kane (SCO)	Joey Jacobs Sr. (ENG)
1958	Henry Loubscher (SAF)	Robert Kane (SCO)	Raymond Galante (CAN)
1962	Clement Quartey (GHA)	Dick McTaggart (SCO)	Harvey Reti (CAN)
1962	Clement Quartey (GHA)	Dick McTaggart (SCO)	Brian Brazier (ENG)
1966	Jim McCourt (NIR)	Aaron Popoola (GHA)	Alex Odhiambo (UGA); Bryan Knoche (AUS)
1970	Mohamed Muruli (UGA)	Dai Davies (WAL)	Emmanuel Lawson (GHA)
1970	Mohamed Muruli (UGA)	Dai Davies (WAL)	Paul Kayula (ZAM)
1974	(Nigeria) Obisia Nwankpa	(Ghana) Joe Martey	(Kenya) Philip Mathenge
1974	(Nigeria) Obisia Nwankpa	(Ghana) Joe Martey	(Scotland) James Douglas
1978	Winfield Braithwaite (GUY)	James Douglas (SCO)	John Raftery (CAN)
1978	Winfield Braithwaite (GUY)	James Douglas (SCO)	Michael Mawangi (KEN)
1982	Christopher Ossai (NGR)	Charles Owiso (KEN)	Clyde McIntosh (ENG)
1982	Christopher Ossai (NGR)	Charles Owiso (KEN)	David Chibuye (ZAM)
1986	Howard Grant (CAN)	David Clencie (AUS)	Brendan Lowe (NIR); Solomon Kondowe (MAW)
1990	Charlie Kane (SCO)	Nicodemus Odore (KEN)	Stefan Scriggins (AUS); Duke Chinyadza (ZIM)
1994	Peter Richardson (ENG)	Mark Winters (NIR)	Trevor Shailer (NZL); Tijani Moro (GHA)
1998	Michael Strange (CAN)	Gerry Legras (SEY)	Casey Johns (AUS); Davis Mwale (ZAM)
2002	Darren Barker (ENG)	Mohammed Kayongo (UGA)	Davidson Emenogu (NGR)
2002	Darren Barker (ENG)	Mohammed Kayongo (UGA)	Davis Mwale (ZAM)
2006	Jamie Cox (ENG)	Moses Kopo (LES)	Jamie Crees (WAL)
2006	Jamie Cox (ENG)	Moses Kopo (LES)	Black Mathenge (KEN)
2010	Manoj Kumar (IND)	Bradley Saunders (ENG)	Valentino Knowles (BAH)
2010	Manoj Kumar (IND)	Bradley Saunders (ENG)	Louis Colin (MRI)
2014	Josh Taylor (SCO)	Jonas Junias (NAM)	Samuel Maxwell (ENG)
2014	Josh Taylor (SCO)	Jonas Junias (NAM)	Sean Duffy (NIR)

=== Welterweight ===
Event	Gold	Silver	Bronze
1930	Leonard Hall (SAF)	Howard Williams (CAN)	Frank Brooman (ENG)
1934	Dave McCleave (ENG)	(South Africa) Dick Barton (SAF)	William Duncan (NIR)
1938	Bill Smith (AUS)	Darcy Heeney (NZL)	(Southern Rhodesia) Andrew Tsirindonis (RHO)
1950	Terry Ratcliffe (ENG)	Bill Seewitz (AUS)	(Dominion of Ceylon) Alex Obeysekere (CEY)
1954	Nicholas Gargano (ENG)	Rodney Litzow (AUS)	Hendrik van der Linde (SAF)
1958	Joseph Greyling (SAF)	Thomas Kawere (UGA)	Robert Dickson Scott (SCO)
1958	Joseph Greyling (SAF)	Thomas Kawere (UGA)	Brian Nancurvis (ENG)
1962	Wallace Coe (NZL)	John Pritchett (ENG)	Albert Turmel (JER)
1966	Eddie Blay (GHA)	Bobby Arthur (ENG)	Frank Young (NIR); Andy Peace (SCO)
1970	Emma Ankudey (GHA)	John Olulu (KEN)	Tommy Joyce (SCO)
1970	Emma Ankudey (GHA)	John Olulu (KEN)	Shivaji Bhonsle (IND)
1974	(Uganda) Mohamed Muruli	(Wales) Errol McKenzie	(Northern Ireland) John Rodgers
1974	(Uganda) Mohamed Muruli	(Wales) Errol McKenzie	(Scotland) Steve Cooney
1978	Mike McCallum (JAM)	Ken Beattie (NIR)	Derrick Hoyt (CAN)
1978	Mike McCallum (JAM)	Ken Beattie (NIR)	Anthony Freal (WAL)
1982	Chris Pyatt (ENG)	Laston Mukobe (ZAM)	Charles Nwokolo (NGR)
1982	Chris Pyatt (ENG)	Laston Mukobe (ZAM)	C. C. Machaiah (IND)
1986	Darren Dyer (ENG)	John McAllister (SCO)	John Shaw (CAN); Damien Denny (NIR)
1990	David Defiagbon (NGR)	Greg Johnson (CAN)	Anthony Mwamba (ZAM); Grahame Cheney (AUS)
1994	Neil Sinclair (NIR)	Eromosele Albert (NGR)	Richard Rowles (AUS); Wald Fleming (CAN)
1998	Jeremy Molitor (CAN)	Absolom Okoth (KEN)	Colin McNeil (SCO); Lynden Hosking (AUS)
2002	Daniel Geale (AUS)	Kwanele Zulu (RSA)	Danny Codling (NZL)
2002	Daniel Geale (AUS)	Kwanele Zulu (RSA)	Paulus Ali Nuumbembe (NAM)
2006	Bongani Mwelase (RSA)	Vijender Singh (IND)	Neil Perkins (ENG)
2006	Bongani Mwelase (RSA)	Vijender Singh (IND)	Olufemi Ajayi (NGR)
2010	Patrick Gallagher (NIR)	Callum Smith (ENG)	Carl Hield (BAH)
2010	Patrick Gallagher (NIR)	Callum Smith (ENG)	Dilbag Singh (IND)
2014 (69 kg)	Scott Fitzgerald (ENG)	Mandeep Jangra (IND)	Tulani Mbenge (RSA)
2014 (69 kg)	Scott Fitzgerald (ENG)	Mandeep Jangra (IND)	Steven Donnelly (NIR)

=== Light middleweight ===
Event	Gold	Silver	Bronze
1954	Wilf Greaves (CAN)	Freddy Wright (NRH)	Bruce Wells (ENG)
1958	Grant Webster (SAF)	Stuart Pearson (ENG)	James Arthur Walters (CAN)
1958	Grant Webster (SAF)	Stuart Pearson (ENG)	Bill Brown (WAL)
1962	Harold Mann (CAN)	Brian Benson (FRN)	Frank Nyangweso (UGA)
1962	Harold Mann (CAN)	Brian Benson (FRN)	Kenneth Hopkins (PNG)
1966	Mark Rowe (ENG)	Tom Imrie (SCO)	Robert Okine (GHA); Nojim Maiyegun (NGA)
1970	Tom Imrie (SCO)	Julius Luipa (ZAM)	Patrick Doherty (NIR)
1970	Tom Imrie (SCO)	Julius Luipa (ZAM)	David Attan (KEN)
1974	(Zambia) Lottie Mwale	(Scotland) Alex Harrison	(New Zealand) Lance Revill
1974	(Zambia) Lottie Mwale	(Scotland) Alex Harrison	(England) Robbie Davies
1978	Kelly Perlette (CAN)	Abdurahman Athuman (KEN)	Ropati Vipo Samu (SAM)
1978	Kelly Perlette (CAN)	Abdurahman Athuman (KEN)	Enock Chama (ZAM)
1982	Shawn O'Sullivan (CAN)	Nick Croombes (ENG)	Roland Omoruyi (NGR)
1982	Shawn O'Sullivan (CAN)	Nick Croombes (ENG)	Tom Corr (NIR)
1986	Dan Sherry (CAN)	Rick Finch (AUS)	Glynn Thomas (WAL); Alec Mullen (SCO)
1990	Richie Woodhall (ENG)	Ray Downey (CAN)	Sililo Figota (SAM); Andy Creary (NZL)
1994	Jimmy Webb (NIR)	Bob Gasio (WSM)	Joseph Townsley (SCO); Rival Cadeau (SEY)
1998	Chris Bessey (ENG)	Scott MacIntosh (CAN)	James Tony (GHA); Jackie Townsley (SCO)
2002	Jean Pascal (CAN)	Paul Smith (ENG)	Junior Greenidge (BAR)
2002	Jean Pascal (CAN)	Paul Smith (ENG)	Craig McEwan (SCO)

=== Middleweight ===
Event	Gold	Silver	Bronze
1930	Fred Mallin (ENG)	Dudley Gallagher (AUS)	Ernest Peirce (SAF)
1934	Alf Shawyer (ENG)	Leonard Wadsworth (CAN)	Jimmy Magill (NIR)
1938	Denis Reardon (WAL)	Maurice Dennis (ENG)	Rex Carey (CAN)
1950	(South Africa) Theunis van Schalkwyk (SAF)	James Beal (NZL)	Bill Pinkus (CAN)
1954	Johannes van der Kolff (SAF)	Arthur Crawford (NRH)	Marcel Piau (CAN)
1958	Terry Milligan (NIR)	Philippus du Plessis (SAF)	Robert Piau (CAN)
1958	Terry Milligan (NIR)	Philippus du Plessis (SAF)	Johnny Caiger (ENG)
1962	Cephas Colquhoun (JAM)	Thomas Arimi (GHA)	Moses Evans (FIJ)
1966	Joe Darkey (GHA)	Arthur Trout (JAM)	John Turpin (ENG); Matthias Ouma (UGA)
1970	John Conteh (ENG)	Titus Simba (TAN)	Robert Murphy (AUS)
1970	John Conteh (ENG)	Titus Simba (TAN)	Samuel Kasongo (ZAM)
1974	(Saint Vincent and the Grenadines) Frankie Lucas	(Zambia) Julius Luipa	(England) Carl Speare
1974	(Saint Vincent and the Grenadines) Frankie Lucas	(Zambia) Julius Luipa	(New Zealand) Les Rackley
1978	Philip McElwaine (AUS)	Delroy Parkes (ENG)	Roddy MacDonald (CAN)
1978	Philip McElwaine (AUS)	Delroy Parkes (ENG)	Richard Betham (SAM)
1982	Jimmy Price (ENG)	Douglas Sam (AUS)	Jeremiah Okoroduddu (NGR)
1982	Jimmy Price (ENG)	Douglas Sam (AUS)	Kevin McDermott (CAN)
1986	Rod Douglas (ENG)	Jeff Harding (AUS)	Patrick Tinney (NIR); George Ferrie (SCO)
1990	Chris Johnson (CAN)	Joseph Laryea (GHA)	Charles Matata (UGA); Mark Edwards (ENG)
1994	Rowan Donaldson (CAN)	Rasmus Ojemaye (NGR)	Peter Wanyoike (KEN); Mike Penniston-John (TRI)
1998	John Pearce (ENG)	Jitender Kumar (IND)	Trevor Stewardson (CAN); Brian Magee (NIR)
2002	Paul Miller (AUS)	Steven Birch (ENG)	Jitender Kumar (IND)
2002	Paul Miller (AUS)	Steven Birch (ENG)	Michael Walchuk (CAN)
2006	Jarrod Fletcher (AUS)	Adonis Stevenson (CAN)	Warren Fuavailili (SAM)
2006	Jarrod Fletcher (AUS)	Adonis Stevenson (CAN)	James DeGale (ENG)
2010	Eamonn O'Kane (NIR)	Anthony Ogogo (ENG)	Vijender Singh (IND)
2010	Eamonn O'Kane (NIR)	Anthony Ogogo (ENG)	Keiran Harding (WAL)
2014	Anthony Fowler (ENG)	Vijender Singh (IND)	Connor Coyle (NIR)
2014	Anthony Fowler (ENG)	Vijender Singh (IND)	Benny Muziyo (ZAM)

=== Light heavyweight ===
Event	Gold	Silver	Bronze
1930	Joe Goyder (ENG)	Al Pitcher (CAN)	Joey Basson (SAF)
1934	George Brennan (ENG)	George Holton (SCO)	(South Africa) Robey Leibbrandt (SAF)
1938	(South Africa) Nick Wolmarans (SAF)	Cecil Overell (AUS)	Joseph Wilby (ENG)
1950	Don Scott (ENG)	Chris Rollinson (NZL)	Jack Taylor (AUS)
1954	Piet van Vuuren (SAF)	Anthony Madigan (AUS)	Bill Misselbrook (CAN)
1958	Anthony Madigan (AUS)	Robert Higgins (WAL)	William Bannon (SCO)
1958	Anthony Madigan (AUS)	Robert Higgins (WAL)	Gerhardus Jacobus De Bruyn (SAF)
1962	Anthony Madigan (AUS)	Jojo Miles (GHA)	Hans Christie (NIR)
1962	Anthony Madigan (AUS)	Jojo Miles (GHA)	Tom Menzies (SCO)
1966	Roger Tighe (ENG)	Fatai Ayinla (NGA)	Dennis Booth (AUS); Sylvester Hines (JAM)
1970	Fatai Ayinla (NGR)	Oliver Wright (JAM)	Victor Attivor (GHA)
1970	Fatai Ayinla (NGR)	Oliver Wright (JAM)	John Rafferty (SCO)
1974	(England) Bill Knight	(New Zealand) William Byrne	(Northern Ireland) Gordon Ferris
1974	(England) Bill Knight	(New Zealand) William Byrne	(Nigeria) Isaac Ikhouria
1978	Roger Fortin (CAN)	Vince Smith (ENG)	Fautala Su'a (SAM)
1978	Roger Fortin (CAN)	Vince Smith (ENG)	Edward Thande (KEN)
1982	Fine Sani (FIJ)	Jonathan Kiriisa (UGA)	Kevin Barry (NZL)
1982	Fine Sani (FIJ)	Jonathan Kiriisa (UGA)	Joseph Poto (ZAM)
1986	Jim Moran (ENG)	Harry Lawson (SCO)	Brent Kosolofski (CAN)
1990	Joseph Akhasamba (KEN)	Dale Brown (CAN)	Nigel Anderson (NZL); Abdu Kaddu (UGA)
1994	Dale Brown (CAN)	John Wilson (SCO)	France Mabiletsa (BOT); Peter Odhiambo (KEN)
1998	Courtney Fry (ENG)	Troy Amos-Ross (CAN)	Samuel Odindo (KEN); Charles Adamu (GHA)
2002	Jegbefumere Albert (NGR)	Joseph Lubega (UGA)	Ben McEachran (AUS)
2002	Jegbefumere Albert (NGR)	Joseph Lubega (UGA)	Danie Venter (RSA)
2006	Kenny Anderson (SCO)	Adura Olalehin (NGR)	Joshua Makonjio (KEN)
2006	Kenny Anderson (SCO)	Adura Olalehin (NGR)	Benjamin McEachran (AUS)
2010	Callum Johnson (SCO)	Thomas McCarthy (NIR)	Joshua Makonjio (KEN)
2010	Callum Johnson (SCO)	Thomas McCarthy (NIR)	Jermaine Asare (WAL)
2014	David Nyika (NZL)	Kennedy St-Pierre (MRI)	Nathan Thorley (WAL)
2014	David Nyika (NZL)	Kennedy St-Pierre (MRI)	Sean McGlinchy (NIR)

=== Heavyweight ===
Event	Gold	Silver	Bronze
1930	Anthony Stuart (ENG)	William Skimming (CAN)	none awarded
1934	Pat Floyd (ENG)	(South Africa) Jan van Rensburg (SAF)	David Douglas-Hamilton (SCO)
1938	Thomas Osborne (CAN)	(South Africa) Claude Sterley (SAF)	Leslie Harley (AUS)
1950	Frank Creagh (NZL)	Sid Cousins (AUS)	none awarded
1954	Brian Harper (ENG)	Gerry Buchanan (CAN)	George Jenkins (SAF)
1958	Daniel Bekker (SAF)	David Thomas (ENG)	Roger Pleace (WAL)
1958	Daniel Bekker (SAF)	David Thomas (ENG)	Gbadegesin Salawu (NGR)
1962	George Oywello (UGA)	Bill Kini (NZL)	Holgar Johansen (FIJ)
1962	George Oywello (UGA)	Bill Kini (NZL)	Graham Robinson (AUS)
1966	Bill Kini (NZL)	Adonis Ray (GHA)	Danny McAlinden (NIR); Benson Ocan (UGA)
1970	Benson Masanda (UGA)	John McKinty (NIR)	Jack Meda (CAN)
1970	Benson Masanda (UGA)	John McKinty (NIR)	Leslie Stevens (ENG)
1974	(England) Neville Meade	(Nigeria) Fatai Ayinla	(Uganda) Benson Masanda
1974	(England) Neville Meade	(Nigeria) Fatai Ayinla	(Samoa) Vai Samu
1978	Julius Awome (ENG)	Adamah Mensah (GHA)	George Stankovich (NZL)
1982	Willie deWit (CAN)	Harold Hylton (ENG)	William Isangura (TAN)
1982	Willie deWit (CAN)	Harold Hylton (ENG)	Mohammed Abdallah (KEN)
1986	James Peau (NZL)	Douggie Young (SCO)	Dominic D'Amico (CAN); Eric Cardouza (ENG)
1990	George Onyango (KEN)	Pat Jordan (CAN)	Kevin Onwuka (NGR); Emerio Fainuulua (SAM)
1994	Omar Ahmed (KEN)	Steve Gallinger (CAN)	Ezwell Ndlovu (ZIM); Charles Kizza (UGA)
1998	Mark Simmons (CAN)	Roland Raforme (SEY)	Kevin Evans (WAL); Garth da Silva (NZL)
2002	Jason Douglas (CAN)	Kertson Manswell (TRI)	Shane Cameron (NZL)
2002	Jason Douglas (CAN)	Kertson Manswell (TRI)	Andrew Young (SCO)
2006	Brad Pitt (AUS)	Harpreet Singh (IND)	Awusone Yekeni (GHA)
2006	Brad Pitt (AUS)	Harpreet Singh (IND)	Fitzgerald Emmanuel (BAR)
2010	Simon Vallily (ENG)	Steven Ward (NIR)	Awusone Yekeni (GHA)
2010	Simon Vallily (ENG)	Steven Ward (NIR)	Stephen Simmons (SCO)
2014	Samir El-Mais (CAN)	David Light (NZL)	Efetobor Wesley Apochi (NGR)
2014	Samir El-Mais (CAN)	David Light (NZL)	Stephen Lavelle (SCO)

=== Super heavyweight ===
Event	Gold	Silver	Bronze
1986	Lennox Lewis (CAN)	Aneurin Evans (WAL)	James Oyebola (ENG)
1990	Michael Kenny (NZL)	Liadi Al-Hassan (GHA)	Vernon Linklater (CAN); Paul Douglas (NIR)
1994	Duncan Dokiwari (NGR)	David Anyim (KEN)	Paea Wolfgramm (TON); Danny Williams (ENG)
1998	Audley Harrison (ENG)	Michael Macaque (MRI)	Justin Whitehead (AUS); Moyoyo Aloryi (GHA)
2002	David Dolan (ENG)	David Cadieux (CAN)	Gozie Dijeh (ZAM)
2002	David Dolan (ENG)	David Cadieux (CAN)	Kevin Evans (WAL)
2006	David Price (ENG)	Kevin Evans (WAL)	Steven Rudic (AUS)
2006	David Price (ENG)	Kevin Evans (WAL)	Varghese Johnson (IND)
2010	Paramjeet Samota (IND)	Tariq Abdul Haqq (TRI)	Blaise Yepmou (CMR)
2010	Paramjeet Samota (IND)	Tariq Abdul Haqq (TRI)	Junior Fa (TON)
2014	Joe Joyce (ENG)	Joseph Goodall (AUS)	Mike Sekabembe (UGA)
2014	Joe Joyce (ENG)	Joseph Goodall (AUS)	Efe Ajagba (NGR)

== Women's ==
=== Flyweight ===
Event	Gold	Silver	Bronze
2014 (48–51 kg)	Nicola Adams (ENG)	Michaela Walsh (NIR)	Pinki Rani (IND)
2014 (48–51 kg)	Nicola Adams (ENG)	Michaela Walsh (NIR)	Mandy Bujold (CAN)

=== Lightweight ===
Event	Gold	Silver	Bronze
2014 (57–60 kg)	Shelley Watts (AUS)	Laishram Devi (IND)	Alanna Audley-Murphy (NIR)
2014 (57–60 kg)	Shelley Watts (AUS)	Laishram Devi (IND)	Maria Machongua (MOZ)

=== Middleweight ===
Event	Gold	Silver	Bronze
2014 (69–75 kg)	Savannah Marshall (ENG)	Ariane Fortin (CAN)	Lauren Price (WAL)
2014 (69–75 kg)	Savannah Marshall (ENG)	Ariane Fortin (CAN)	Edith Ogoke (NGR)

(*) Tommy Holt received a bronze medal and not a silver medal as stated on some websites, the bantamweight final was between Harry Mizler of England and John Keller of Canada.
