= Boxing at the 1966 British Empire and Commonwealth Games =

- Venue: Sabina Park (prelims); National Stadium (finals)
- Location: Kingston, Jamaica
- Dates: 4 to 13 August 1966

Boxing at the 1966 British Empire and Commonwealth Games was the eighth appearance of the Boxing at the Commonwealth Games. The events were held in Kingston, Jamaica and featured contests in ten weight classes.

The boxing events were held at two locations, with the early rounds held at Sabina Park and the finals held at the National Stadium in Independence Park.

Ghana topped the boxing medal table again (having previously done so four years earlier) by virtue of winning three gold medals.

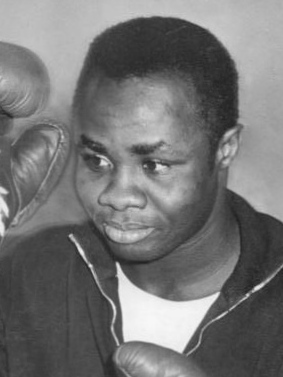
Eddie Blay won welterweight gold and helped Ghana top the medal table

== Medal table ==
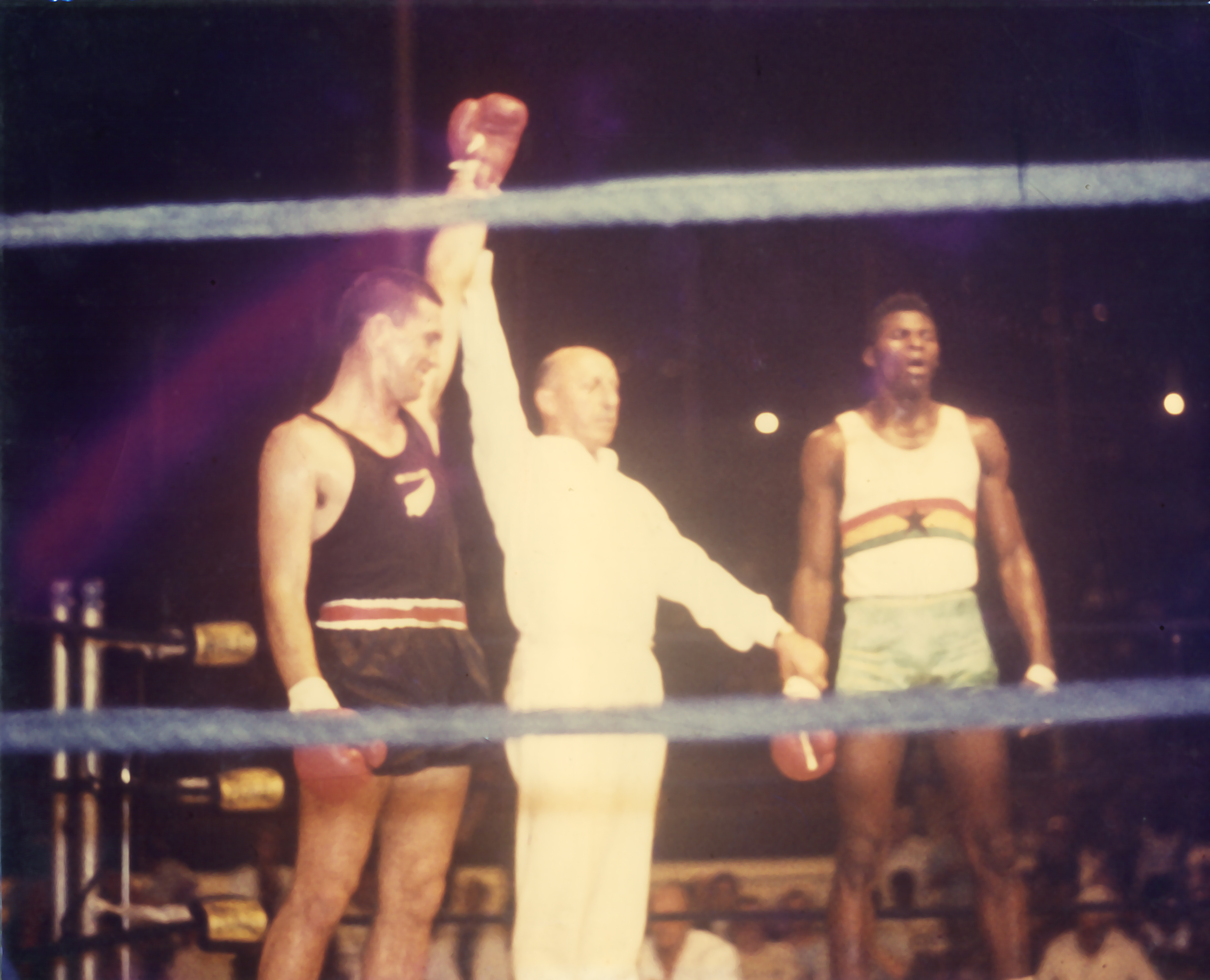
New Zealander Bill Kini wins heavyweight gold

* Host nation (Jamaica)

Medals won by nation with totals, ranked by number of golds—sortable
Rank	Nation	Gold	Silver	Bronze	Total
1	Ghana	3	2	2	7
2	England	2	2	2	6
3	Nigeria	2	1	1	4
4	Northern Ireland	1	1	2	4
5	Kenya	1	0	2	3
6	New Zealand	1	0	1	2
7	Jamaica*	0	2	2	4
8	Australia	0	1	3	4
9	Scotland	0	1	1	2
10	Uganda	0	0	3	3
11	Canada	0	0	1	1
Totals (11 entries)		10	10	20	40

== Medallists ==
Weight	Gold	Silver	Bronze
Flyweight	Sulley Shittu (Ghana)	Kenneth Campbell (Jamaica)	Frank Scott (Canada); John Rakowski (Australia)
Bantamweight	Eddie Ndukwu (Nigeria)	Darryl Norwood (Australia)	Nderu Mwaura (Kenya); Brian Kendall (New Zealand)
Featherweight	Philip Waruinge (Kenya)	Paddy Maguire (Northern Ireland)	Amos Ajoo (Ghana); Harold West (Jamaica)
Lightweight	Anthony Andeh (Nigeria)	Ron Thurston (England)	Stephen Baraza (Kenya); Sammy Lockhart (Northern Ireland)
Light Welterweight	Jim McCourt (Northern Ireland)	Aaron Popoola (Ghana)	Alex Odhiambo (Uganda); Bryan Knoche (Australia)
Welterweight	Eddie Blay (Ghana)	Bobby Arthur (England)	Frank Young (Northern Ireland); Andy Peace (Scotland)
Light Middleweight	Mark Rowe (England)	Tom Imrie (Scotland)	Robert Okine (Ghana); Nojim Maiyegun (Nigeria)
Middleweight	Joe Darkey (Ghana)	Arthur Trout (Jamaica)	John Turpin (England); Matthias Ouma (Uganda)
Light Heavyweight	Roger Tighe (England)	Fatai Ayinla (Nigeria)	Dennis Booth (Australia); Sylvester Hines (Jamaica)
Heavyweight	Bill Kini (New Zealand)	Adonis Ray (Ghana)	Danny McAlinden (Northern Ireland); Benson Ocan (Uganda)

== Results ==
=== Flyweight 51kg ===
Round	Winner	Loser	Score
Preliminary	(Canada) Frank Scott	(New Zealand) Wayne Young	Pts
Quarter-Final	(Jamaica) Kenneth Campbell	(Kenya) Peter Manene	Pts
Quarter-Final	(Canada) Frank Scott	(Scotland) John Kellie	w/o
Quarter-Final	(Australia) John Rakowski	(Wales) Maurice Aldridge	Pts
Quarter-Final	(Ghana) Sulley Shittu	(England) Johnny Clark	Pts
Semi-Final	(Jamaica) Kenneth Campbell	(Canada) Frank Scott	Pts
Semi-Final	(Ghana) Sulley Shittu	(Australia) John Rakowski	TKO2
Final	(Ghana) Sulley Shittu	(Jamaica) Kenneth Campbell	Pts

=== Bantamweight 54kg ===
Round	Winner	Loser	Score
Preliminary	(Ghana) Steve Akushie	(Scotland) Bobby Mallon	Pts
Preliminary	(India) Namdeo More	(Northern Ireland) Jim McAuley	Pts
Preliminary	(Jamaica) Charlie Henry	(British Honduras) Wilfred McDonald	AB2
Preliminary	(Australia) Darryl Norwood	(Canada) Jim MacMillan	Pts
Preliminary	(New Zealand) Brian Kendall	(Singapore) Nai Nee Virabhak	Pts
Quarter-Final	(Kenya) John Nderu	(Jersey) M. Micheletti	TKO 2
Quarter-Final	(Nigeria) Eddie Ndukwu	(Ghana) Steve Akushie	Pts
Quarter-Final	(New Zealand) Brian Kendall	(Jamaica) Charlie Henry	Pts
Quarter-Final	(Australia) Darryl Norwood	(India) Namdeo More	Pts
Semi-Final	(Nigeria) Eddie Ndukwu	(Kenya) John Nderu	Pts
Semi-Final	(Australia) Darryl Norwood	(New Zealand) Brian Kendall	Pts
Final	(Nigeria) Eddie Ndukwu	(Australia) Darryl Norwood	Pts

=== Featherweight 57kg ===
Round	Winner	Loser	Score
Preliminary	(Wales) Tommy Dwyer	(Guyana) T. Green	DQ 2
Preliminary	(Ghana) Amos Ajao	(British Honduras) Llewelyn Sutherland	TKO 1
Preliminary	(Kenya) Philip Waruinge	(England) Ken Cooper	Pts
Prelimvary	(India) Denis Swamy	(Dominion of Ceylon) Arachige Gunasinghe	TKO 2
Preliminary	(Northern Ireland) Paddy Maguire	(Scotland) Hugh Baxter	Pts
Quarter-Final	(Ghana) Amos Ajao	(Wales) Tommy Dwyer	Pts
Quarter-Final	(Kenya) Philip Waruinge	(India) Denis Swamy	TKOI 3
Quarter-Final	(Northern Ireland) Paddy Maguire	(Canada) Walter Johnston	TKOI 2
Quarter-Final	(Jamaica) Harold West	(Nigeria) Jonathan Dele	Pts
Semi-Final	(Kenya) Philip Waruinge	(Ghana) Amos Ajao	Pts
Semi-Final	(Northern Ireland) Paddy Maguire	(Jamaica) Harold West	Pts
Final	(Kenya) Philip Waruinge	(Northern Ireland) Paddy Maguire	Pts

=== Lightweight 60kg ===
Round	Winner	Loser	Score
Preliminary	(Scotland) Bobby Porteous	(New Zealand) Paul Domney	Pts
Preliminary	(England) Ron Thurston	(Jamaica) Charles Bryan	Pts
Preliminary	(Kenya) Stephen Baraza	(Wales) Reg Perry	Pts
Preliminary	(Canada) Arthur Jones	(Australia) William Fry	KO 3
Quarter-Final	(Nigeria) Anthony Andeh	(Ghana) Jack Sennas	TKO 2
Quarter-Final	(Northern Ireland) Sammy Lockhart	(India) G. Rajan	Pts
Quarter-Final	(Kenya) Stephen Baraza	(Scotland) Bobby Porteous	Pts
Quarter-Final	(England) Ron Thurston	(Canada) Arthur Jones	Pts
Semi-Final	(England) Ron Thurston	(Kenya) Stephen Baraza	TKOI 2
Semi-Final	(Nigeria) Anthony Andeh	(Northern Ireland) Sammy Lockhart	Pts
Final	(Nigeria) Anthony Andeh	(England) Ron Thurston	Pts

=== Light Welterweight 63.5kg ===
Round	Winner	Loser	Score
Preliminary	(Kenya) John Olulu	(Jamaica) Kenneth Nelson	Pts
Preliminary	(Uganda) Alex Odhiambo	(Wales) Geoff Cutts	TKO 2
Preliminary	(Northern Ireland) Jim McCourt	(British Honduras) David Dakers	w/o
Preliminary	(Guyana) Ivelaw Glen	(Sierra Leone) L. Sesay	Pts
Quarter-Final	(Northern Ireland) Jim McCourt	(Guyana) Ivelaw Glen	KO 2
Quarter-Final	(Uganda) Alex Odhiambo	(Kenya) John Olulu	Pts
Quarter-Final	(Ghana) Aaron Popoola	(Canada) Dick Findlay	TKOI 3
Quarter-Final	(Australia) Ray Maguire	(England) Billy Hiatt	Pts
Semi-Final	(Northern Ireland) Jim McCourt	(Uganda) Alex Odhiambo	Pts
Semi-Final	(Ghana) Aaron Popoola	(Australia) Ray Maguire	Pts
Final	(Northern Ireland) Jim McCourt	(Ghana) Aaron Popoola	Pts

=== Welterweight 67kg ===
Round	Winner	Loser	Score
Preliminary	(England) Bobby Arthur	(Jersey) Albert Turmel	Pts
Preliminary	(Kenya) Alex Oundo	(Sierra Leone) J. Robinson	DQ 3
Quarter-Final	(England) Bobby Arthur	(Kenya) Alex Oundo	Pts
Quarter-Final	(Northern Ireland) Frank Young	(Nigeria) Raimi Gbadamosi	Pts
Quarter-Final	(Scotland) Andy Peace	(Guyana) D. Green	TKO 3
Quarter-Final	(Ghana) Eddie Blay	(Jamaica) Beresford Small	Pts
Semi-Final	(England) Bobby Arthur	(Northern Ireland) Frank Young	Pts
Semi-Final	(Ghana) Eddie Blay	(Scotland) Andy Peace	Pts
Final	(Ghana) Eddie Blay	(England) Bobby Arthur	Pts

=== Light Middleweight 71kg ===
Round	Winner	Loser	Score
Preliminary	(Canada) Donato Paduano	(Northern Ireland) Eamonn McCusker	Pts
Preliminary	(Jamaica) Nasley Thompson	(Gibraltar) Jose Luis Caballero	TKO 3
Preliminary	(England) Mark Rowe	(Wales) Dave Cranswick	TKO 2
Quarter-Final	(Scotland) Tom Imrie	(Kenya) Ali Said	KO 3
Quarter-Final	(Ghana) Robert Okine	(Guyana) Aubrey December	DQ 1
Quarter-Final	(Nigeria) Nojim Maiyegun	(Canada) Donato Paduano	Pts
Quarter-Final	(England) Mark Rowe	(Jamaica) Nasley Thompson	TKO 3
Semi-Final	(Scotland) Tom Imrie	(Ghana) Robert Okine	Pts
Semi-Final	(England) Mark Rowe	(Nigeria) Nojim Maiyegun	TKOI 2
Final	(England) Mark Rowe	(Scotland) Tom Imrie	Pts

=== Middleweight 75kg ===
Round	Winner	Loser	Score
Quarter-Final	(England) John Turpin	(Sierra Leone) Ben Akins	Pts
Quarter-Final	(Jamaica) Arthur Troutt	(Kenya) Patrick Wattengah	Pts
Quarter-Final	(Uganda) Matthias Ouma	(Guyana) Neville Braithwaite	TKO 2
Semi-Final	(Jamaica) Arthur Troutt	(England) John Turpin	Pts
Semi-Final	(Ghana) Joe Darkey	(Uganda) Matthias Ouma	Pts
Final	(Ghana) Joe Darkey	(Jamaica) Arthur Troutt	KO 2

=== Light Heavyweight 81kg ===
Round	Winner	Loser	Score
Quarter-Final	(Jamaica) Sylvester Hines	(Canada) Heinz Koppe	Pts
Quarter-Final	(Nigeria) Fatai Ayinla	(Kenya) Hamisi Abdullah	Pts
Semi-Final	(Nigeria) Fatai Ayinla	(Jamaica) Sylvester Hines	TKO 2
Semi-Final	(England) Roger Tighe	(Australia) Dennis Booth	Pts
Final	(England) Roger Tighe	(Nigeria) Fatai Ayinla	Pts

=== Heavyweight +81kg ===
Round	Winner	Loser	Score
Quarter-Final	(New Zealand) Bill Kini	(Sierra Leone) John Coker	w/o
Quarter-Final	(Ghana) Adonis Ray	(Jamaica) Leroy Johnson	TKO 2
Quarter-Final	(Uganda) Benson Ocan	(Kenya) Stephen Matiani	Pts
Semi-Final	(Kenya) Bill Kini	(Northern Ireland) Danny McAlinden	Pts
Semi-Final	(Ghana) Adonis Ray	(Uganda) Benson Ocan	TKO 1
Final	(New Zealand) Bill Kini	(Ghana) Adonis Ray	Pts
