= List of Nigerian male boxers =

This is a list of Nigerian male boxers. Boxing is a combat sport in which two people wearing protective gloves throw punches at each other for a predetermined set of time in a boxing ring.

- Friday Ahunanya
- Muideen Akanji
- Jegbefumere Albert
- Ray Amoo
- Davidson Andeh
- Akeem Anifowoshe
- Efetobor Wesley Apochi
- Efe Ajagba
- Tunji Awojobi
- Fatai Ayinla
- Hogan Bassey
- Nestor Bolum
- Jonathan Dele
- Duncan Dokiwari
- Olanrewaju Durodola
- Ehinomen Ehikhamenor
- Onorede Ehwareme
- Isaac Ekpo
- Billy Famous
- Muideen Ganiyu
- Ike Ibeabuchi
- Richard Igbineghu
- Kingsley Ikeke
- Isaac Ikhouria
- Dauda Izobo
- David Izonritei
- Emmanuel Izonritei
- Jacklord Jacobs
- Hogan Jimoh
- Yaqub Kareem
- Lateef Kayode
- Peter Konyegwachie
- Lukman Lawal
- Rasheed Lawal
- Nojim Maiyegun
- Eddie Ndukwu
- Obisia Nwankpa
- Emmanuel Nwodo
- Effiong Okon
- Andy Ologun
- Gbenga Oloukun
- Fatai Onikeke
- Joe Orewa
- Teke Oruh
- Christopher Ossai
- Cyril Panther
- Samuel Peter
- Mohammed Sabo
- Ahmed Sadiq
- Dick Tiger
- Tony Saibu
- Obaloluwa Fasanya
