= Scotland at the 1966 British Empire and Commonwealth Games =

- CGF code: SCO
- CGA: Commonwealth Games Scotland
- Website: www.teamscotland.scot

in Kingston, Jamaica
- Flag bearer: Phil Caira
- Medals Ranked 13th: Gold 1 Silver 4 Bronze 4 Total 9

British Empire and Commonwealth Games appearances
- 1930; 1934; 1938; 1950; 1954; 1958; 1962; 1966; 1970; 1974; 1978; 1982; 1986; 1990; 1994; 1998; 2002; 2006; 2010; 2014; 2018; 2022; 2026; 2030

Scotland competed at the 1966 British Empire and Commonwealth Games in Kingston, Jamaica, from 4 to 14 August 1966.

Scotland sent a team of 60 athletes and 11 officials with £13,000 raised against a £10,000 target. Weightlifter Phil Caira was the flag bearer and Bob McGregor was named the team captain.

Scotland came 13th overall with one gold, four silver and four bronze medals.

== Medalists ==
=== Gold ===
- Jim Alder (marathon)

=== Silver ===
- Wallace Booth (wrestling)
- Tom Imrie (boxing)
- Sandy Leckie (fencing)
- Bob McGregor (swimming)

=== Bronze ===
- Jim Alder (6 miles)
- Andy Peace (boxing)
- Men's foil team (fencing)
- Mixed doubles team (badminton)

== Team ==
=== Athletics ===
Men

Athlete	Events	Club	Medals
Jim Alder	6 miles, marathon	Edinburgh AC	,
Laurie Bryce	Hammer throw	Edinburgh University AC	
Menzies Campbell	100, 220 yards	Garscube Harriers	
Crawford Fairbrother	High jump	Victoria Park AAC	
Norrie Foster	Decathlon, pole vault	Glasgow University AC	
Graeme Grant	1 mile	Dumbarton AAC	
John Linaker	1 mile, steeplechase	Pitreavie AAC	
Mike Lindsay	Discus, shot put	Queen's Park Harriers	
Ian McCafferty	3 miles	Motherwell Y.M.C.A.	
Fergus Murray	3 miles	Edinburgh University AC	
Dave Stevenson	Pole vault	Edinburgh Southern Harriers	
Lachie Stewart	3 miles, steeplechase	Vale of Leven AC	

Women

Athlete	Events	Club	Medals
Georgena Craig	880 yards	Western AC	
Alix Jamieson	100 yards, Long jump	Western AC	
Moira Kerr	Shot put	Maryhill Ladies AC	
Barbara Lyall	220, 440 yards	Tayside AAC	
Rosemary Payne	Discus, shot put	Lozells AC	
Rosemary Stirling	880 yards	Wolverhampton & Bilston AC	

=== Badminton ===
Men

Athlete	Events	Club	Medals
Mac Henderson	doubles, mixed doubles	Glasgow	
Bob McCoig	singles, doubles, mixed doubles	Cazinove BC, Middlesex	Bronze medal

Women

Athlete	Events	Club	Medals
Cathie Dunglison	doubles, mixed doubles	Pollockshields BC, Glasgow	
Muriel Ferguson	singles, doubles, mixed doubles	Cazinove BC, Middlesex	Bronze medal

=== Boxing ===
Athlete	Events	Club	Medals
Hugh Baxter	57kg featherweight	Kelvin ABC, Glasgow	
Tom Imrie	71kg Light-middleweight	Buccleuch ABC	Silver medal
John Kellie	51kg flyweight	Dundee ABC	
Bobby Mallon	54kg bantamweight	Dennistoun Youth Club, Glasgow	
Andy Peace	67kg Welterweight	Fife & Clackmannan Miners ABC	Bronze medal
Bobby Porteous	60kg lightweight	Ormiston Welfare ABC	

=== Cycling ===
Athlete	Events	Club	Medals
Billy Bilsland	Road race	Glasgow Wheelers	

=== Diving ===
Athlete	Events	Club	Medals
Brian Davidson	Platform	Glasgow	

=== Fencing ===
Men

Athlete	Events	Club	Medals
Sandy Leckie	Foil, sabre, team épée & foil	London Fencing Club	Silver medal
Joseph Rorke	team foil	Glasgow Fencing Club	Bronze medal
George Sandor	épée, foil, team foil	Edinburgh University FC	Bronze medal
Robert Wilson	épée, sabre, team épée & foil	Glasgow Fencing Club	Bronze medal

Women

Athlete	Events	Club	Medals
Judith Herriot	Foil	Glasgow Fencing Club	

=== Shooting ===
Men

Athlete	Events	Club	Medals
William H. Crawford	Fullbore rifle	Dumfries	
Adam Gordon	50m rifle prone	Bon Accord Rifle Club, Aberdeen	
Ronald J. Ramsay	50m pistol, centre fire pistol	Dundonald Rifle & Pistol Club	
Ian B. Robertson	50m rifle prone	Bon Accord Rifle Club, Aberdeen	
James M. Robertson	Fullbore rifle		

=== Swimming ===
Men

Athlete	Events	Club	Medals
Gordon Black	110y freestyle, 110y butterfly, relay x 2	Inverness ASC	
Downie Brown	110y, 440y freestyle, relay	Arlington Baths Club, Glasgow	
Alex Galletly	440y freestyle, 220y butterfly, relay	Perth SC	
Andrew Harrower	110y, 220y butterfly	Dunfermline Carnegie SC	
Eric Henderson	110y, 220y butterfly, relay	Paisley SC	
Bob McGregor	110 yd freestyle, relay x 2	Falkirk Otter ASC	Silver medal
Casey Nelson	110y, 220y backstroke, relay	Falkirk Otter ASC	

Women

Athlete	Events	Club	Medals
Ann Baxter	110y, 220y breaststroke, relay	Dunfermline Carnegie SC	
Margaret Fenton	110y, 440y freestyle	Paisley SC	
Fiona Kellock	110y, 440y freestyle, relay	Falkirk Otter ASC	
Bobbie Robertson	110y, 220y backstroke, relay	Leith ASC	
Eleanor Stewart	110y freestyle , 110y butterfly, relay	Kilmarnock ASC	

=== Weightlifting ===
Athlete	Events	Club	Medals
Phil Caira	82.5kg light-heavyweight	Phil Caira Physical School of Training, Kirkcaldy	
Jim Ferguson	110kg heavyweight	Al Murray's, London	
John McNiven	56kg bantamweight	Glasgow Sports Centre	
Jimmy Moir	67.5kg lightweight	Hamilton, Ontario	

=== Wrestling ===
Athlete	Events	Club	Medals
Tam Anderson	68kg lightweight	Schiltorn Club	
Wallace Booth	90kg light-heavyweight	Milton, Edinburgh	Silver medal
John McCourtney	62kg featherweight	Milngavie 41 Club	
Jim Turnbull	57kg bantamweight	Milton, Edinburgh	
