= Mark Rowe =

Mark Rowe may refer to:

- Mark Rowe (sprinter)
- Mark Rowe (boxer)

== See also ==
- Mark Roe, English golfer
- Mark O'Rowe, Irish playwright and screenwriter
