= BC Golden Gloves =

Boxing competitions

The Golden Gloves in British Columbia, Canada has been a key amateur boxing tournament since its inception in 1939. The debut Golden Gloves champions in 1939 were Wayne Morris, Alan Dunn, Phil Vickery, Erick Burnell, Bob Hickey, Henry Devine and Kenny Lindsay. The first Golden Boy was Phil Vickery.

== The Sun Golden Gloves ==
Following promotion of amateur boxing in 1938, the executive of the BC Amateur Boxing Association believed it was time to start a Golden Gloves tournament. The Vancouver Sun newspaper accepted the sponsorship for the province of British Columbia. The first tournament took place in 1939.

Some of the Golden Gloves Alumni (boxers) from 1939 to 2010 were:

- Gordon Grayson - Royal Canadian Navy heavyweight boxer
- Bobby Parker - 1940s boxer
- Jack Patterson - 1940 won Heavyweight title in Seattle Golden Gloves
- Tommy Symes - 1940s boxer
- Chester Orr - 1945 Golden Boy
- Art Burgess - Victoria boxer in 1946 Golden Gloves
- Everett Biggs - Alberni boxer 1946 Golden Gloves
- Eddie Haddad - 1947
- Harold Mann - 1958
- Jack Straza - 1959 Golden Boy
- Skimp Williams - two special awards in 1960
- Alan Curtis - 1960 Golden Boy
- Mike Caird - 1960 and 1963
- Freddy Fuller - 1965
- Bob Kacer - 1966 Tacoma Golden Gloves featherweight champion
- Brian Zelley - 1967 and 1968
- Dave Wylie: 1967 Diamond Boy
- Ray Lampkin - 1968 Golden Boy
- Neil Knight - 1969 Golden Boy
- Buzz Montour - 1970 Golden Boy
- Garry Serko - 1983 and 1985 Golden Gloves Champion, 1985 runner-up Golden Boy and 1985 Provincial Champion
- Manny Sobral - 1986
- Geronimo Bie - 1988
- Jack Meda
- Dick Findlay Dick Findlay - 1966 and 1967 BC Golden Boy and 1968 Olympic boxer
- Chris Ius Chris Ius - 1972 and 1976 Olympic boxer
- Leslie Hamilton - 1972 Olympic boxer
- Gordie Lawson - scored the only knockout in the 1975 BC Golden Gloves
- Wayne Crowe - 1976
- Danny O'Sullivan - 1976
- Dale Walters - 1984 Olympic bronze medal
- Sidney McKnight - 1976 Olympic boxer
- Frank Albert Scott - 1966 Commonwealth Games bronze medal
- Randy Elson - three time Junior Golden Boy
- Clary Poitras - 2006 Heavyweight Champ
- Travis Lepine - 2006 BC Golden Boy
- Shane Knox - 2006 BC Golden Boy
- Oliver Enns - 2008 BC Golden Boy
- Dylan Bishop - 2010 BC Golden Boy

== 1946 Golden Gloves ==
The tournament was sponsored by The Vancouver Sun, and was held February 14 and 15, 1946 at the Hastings Park Forum, Vancouver, BC.

Some of the boxers highlighted in the official program were Jimmy Crook, Lyle Kehoe, Ken McPhee, Terry Doyle, coach Tommy Gann, Vic Murdoch, coach Russ Gatake, coach Len Gervais, Jackie Tuner, Freddy Steele, Roddy MacDonald, referee Ernie Brown, Jack Herwynen and world champion Barney Ross.

A special section of the official program included names of some of the past British Columbia boxers that were in previous Seattle Golden Glove tournaments between 1942 and 1945: Gordon Grayson, Robert Hickie, Tommy Symes, Jackie Turner, Joe Ashenbrenner, Hank Egli, Roy Burnell, Bert Lepitre, Freddy Steele, Bobby Parker, Vic Murdoch, and Lyle Keho.

== 1960 BC Golden Gloves ==
Following the competition, the boxer selected as the Golden Boy was Victoria boxer Alan Curtis.

== 1961 BC Golden Gloves ==
The Golden Boy for 1961 was Bill "Curly" Adams.

== 1967 BC Golden Gloves ==
The Golden Boy for the second year in a row was Dick Findlay.

=== Preliminary bout boxers ===
From the newspaper files, the results were published in a February issue of the Vancouver Sun.

=== Boxers ===
Jack Straza, Orlan Ralph, Leo Chabot, Stephen Flajole, Cliff Belcourt, Bob Kacer, Wayne Boyce, Ken Henderson, Brian Zelley, Vern Fouth, Del Deugau, Danny Gontes, Ron White, Fred Fuller, Dave Wylie, Steve Tohill, Pete Salgot, Pat O'Reilly, Jim Dixon, Lennie Erdmann, Kevin Jones, Fred Desrosiers, Toby Crook, Colin Coleridge, George Perez, Denis Rorick, Ken Egan, Gord Sinclair, Kelly Adams, Ron Wilson, George Smith, Ken Tommy, Howard Hewitt, Glenn McGee, Terry Eastman, Marion Kolar, Richard Fleck, Travis Lepine, Ken Alexander, Ed Ostapovich, John Kirk, George Van Nockay, Roy Smith, Jack Meda, Bill Taylor.

=== Champions and finalists ===
Derek Austin, Randy Jones, Ray Lampkin, Frank Scott, Brian Zelley, Dick Coulson, Philip King, Dick Findlay, Freddy Fuller, Lennie Erdmann, Steve Tohill, Gordon Sinclair, Colin Coleridge, Ron Manson, Ron Wilson, Ken Tommy, Marion Kolar, Wes Craven and Jack Meda

British Columbia Amateur Boxing Semi-Final Action Winners

The semi-final stage of the British Columbia amateur boxing tournament featured a competitive lineup of boxers representing various regions and clubs across the province. Among the performers were:

Derek Austin of Langley

Dave Johnson and Dave Allerdice of the North West Eagles

Brian Zelley

Frank Scott

John Carr of the Vancouver Firefighters Boxing Club

Laurie Rorick of Prince George

Travis Lepine, a 2006 British Columbia Champion known for securing nine first-round knockouts, who trained out of Trail, British Columbia

Billy Taylor

Rick Fleck

These athletes advanced through the tournament bracket while competing for provincial titles and qualification opportunities at the national level.

== 1984 BC Golden Gloves ==
The tournament took place in January 1984 in Burnaby at the Boxing BC Training centre, which would also be used as a training camp for the 1984 and 1988 Canadian Olympic boxing teams.

At the end of the tournament the Golden Boy for 1984 was boxer Michael O'Connell and the runner-up was Joe Pendry, and the best youth boxer was Deep Butter.

=== Ring officials ===
Bert Lowes, Fred Fuller, Rudy Bianco, Sid Knopp Vic Murdoch, Larry Carney, Earl Vance, Jack Mellor, Larry Krangle, Brian Zelley, Rick Brough and Bob Newbrook.

Announcer: Joe Swift. Glovers: Tommy Yule and Gordon Miller.

=== Champions and finalists ===
Bassam Batrani, Scott Bannink, Jamie Ballard, Gary Wood, Dale Walters, Scott Cessford, Joe Pendry, Ken Smith, Alex Angelomatis, Tim Howie, Leon Chambers, Dan Zaleski, Lee Gauthier, John Wilson George Pires, Derek Wolfe, Deep Butter, Willie Curry, Michael O'Connell, Kika Singh, Al Harper, Garry Serko, Cody Redford, Joe Martin and Tom Coady.

== 2012 BC Golden Gloves and other tournaments ==
The 2012 BC Golden Gloves were scheduled to take place in Vernon, BC in April. The 2012 Silver Gloves were scheduled to be hosted by the Mission City Boxing Club in June 2012.

The Silver Gloves has a history that begins in 1943 due to the efforts of Val Roach. In 1960, the tournament was hosted by the South Burnaby boxing club under the direction of Harry Twist. From 1961 to 1967 the tournament remained inactive until a revival in 1968 in Richmond, BC.

== Sources ==
- Brian W. Zelley, former editor BC Amateur Boxing News, 1984 BC Amateur Boxing News Annual
- Ring records of Frederick Stephen Fuller, and Boxing BC
- Boxing records of Bert Lowes, Mike Caird and Tommy Paonessa

The Paonessa records are courtesy of John Paonessa

- Boxing records of Gordie Lawson, former amateur and professional boxer
- Boxing records of Howard Curling, former Vancouver Island Amateur Boxing Commissioner and ring official
- For 2012, the sources include Boxing BC and the host clubs.
