= Tommy Dwyer =

Tommy Dwyer may refer to:

- Tommy Dwyer (hurler), Irish hurler
- Tommy Dwyer (American football) (1900–1967), American football, basketball, and baseball coach and civil engineer
- Tommy Dwyer (boxer), Welsh boxer
