= Brian Kendall =

Brian Kendall may refer to:

- Brian Kendall (One Life to Live), a character in the American soap opera One Life to Live
- Brian Kendall (boxer) (1947–1998), New Zealand boxer
