= Athletics at the 1966 British Empire and Commonwealth Games – Women's shot put =

Women's shot put at the 1966 British Empire and Commonwealth Games
- Venue: Independence Park, Kingston
- Dates: August 6, 1966

Medalists
| gold medal | Valerie Sloper-Young | New Zealand |
| silver medal | Mary Peters | Northern Ireland |
| bronze medal | Nancy McCredie | Canada |

The women's shot put event at the 1966 British Empire and Commonwealth Games was held on 6 August at the Independence Park in Kingston, Jamaica.

== Results ==
Final results
| Rank | Name | Nationality | Distance | Notes |
|---|---|---|---|---|
| 1st place, gold medalist(s) | Valerie Sloper-Young | New Zealand | 54 ft 1 3/4 in (16.50 m) | |
| 2nd place, silver medalist(s) | Mary Peters | Northern Ireland | 53 ft 5 1/2 in (16.29 m) | |
| 3rd place, bronze medalist(s) | Nancy McCredie | Canada | 50 ft 4 in (15.34 m) | |
| 4 | Jean Roberts | Australia | 48 ft 1 1/4 in (14.66 m) | |
| 5 | Diane Charteris | New Zealand | 46 ft 5 1/4 in (14.15 m) | |
| 6 | Brenda Bedford | England | 45 ft 9 in (13.94 m) | |
| 7 | Carol Martin | Canada | 44 ft 6 3/4 in (13.58 m) | |
| 8 | Judy Dahlgren | Canada | 42 ft 3 1/4 in (12.88 m) | |
| 9 | Jennifer Wingerson | Canada | 40 ft 10 in (12.45 m) | |
| 10 | Moira Kerr | Scotland | 40 ft 4 in (12.29 m) | |
| 11 | Joan Gordon | Jamaica | 37 ft 10 1/2 in (11.54 m) | |
| | Christine Payne | Scotland | DNS | |
