= John Turpin =

John Turpin may refer to:

- John Turpin (boxer), English boxer
- John Henry Turpin, sailor in the United States Navy
