= Roger Pratt =

Roger Pratt may refer to:

- Roger Pratt (architect) (1620–1684), English gentleman architect
- Roger Pratt (cinematographer) (1947–2024), British cinematographer
- Roger Pratt (cyclist) (born 1944), Welsh cyclist
