= Margaret Fenton =

British swimmer

Personal information
- Nationality: British (Scottish)
- Born: 1950 Scotland

Sport
- Sport: Swimming
- Events: Freestyle, Backstroke, Medley
- Club: Paisley SC

Margaret Fenton (born c.1950) is a former international swimmer from Scotland who competed at the Commonwealth Games.

== Biography ==
Fenton was a member of the Paisley Swimming Club and specialised in the freestyle but was also proficient in backstroke and the medley.

Fenton represented the Scotland team at the 1966 British Empire and Commonwealth Games in Kingston, Jamaica, where she participated in 110 and 440 yards freestyle events.

Shortly after the Games, Fenton won the 440 yards freestyle at the Wales versus Scotland Tenovus Trophy and was the Scottish medley record holder in 1967.

She attended a second Commonwealth Games at the 1970 British Commonwealth Games in Edinburgh.
