= Ruth Graham (swimmer) =

Northern Irish swimmer

Personal information
- Nationality: British (Northern Irish)
- Born: c.1952 Northern Ireland

Sport
- Sport: Swimming
- Events: Breaststroke, Medley
- Club: New Northern ASC

Ruth Graham (born c.1952) is a former swimmer from Northern Ireland, who represented Northern Ireland at the British Empire and Commonwealth Games (now Commonwealth Games).

== Biography ==
Graham was a member of the New Northern Amateur Swimming Club in Belfast

In February 1965, she was selected in the initial list of swimmers for the forthcoming Empire Games. In April 1966 at the age of 14, she broke two Irish swimming records.

Graham represented the 1966 Northern Irish Team at the 1966 British Empire and Commonwealth Games in Kingston, Jamaica, participating in the 110 yards and 220 yards breaststroke events.

Her older brother Paddy Graham was an international swimmer and also competed at the Games.

Graham a pupil at Victoria College, Belfast, continued to represent Ireland at international level and was also proficient in the medley events.
