= Hugh Baxter =

Scottish boxer

Personal information
- Nationality: British (Scottish)
- Born: c.1943

Sport
- Sport: Boxing
- Event: Featherweight
- Club: Kelvin ABC, Glasgow

Hugh Baxter (born c.1943) is a former boxer from Scotland who competed at the 1966 British Empire and Commonwealth Games (now Commonwealth Games).

== Biography ==
Baxter boxed out of the Kelvin Amateur Boxing Club in Glasgow and finished runner-up behind Frankie Gilfeather in the 1965 lightweight championship of Scotland

Baxter represented the Scottish Empire and Commonwealth Games team at the 1966 British Empire and Commonwealth Games in Kingston, Jamaica, participating in the 57kg featherweight category.

A boiler maker by profession, he won the prestigious ABA featherweight title at Wembley in 1966.

Baxter turned professional on 19 December 1966 and fought in 21 bouts.
