= Dave Cranswick =

Welsh boxer

Personal information
- Nationality: British (Welsh)
- Born: 15 July 1945

Sport
- Sport: Boxing
- Events: Light-middleweight welterweight
- Club: Domino BC, Barry; Roath, Cardiff; Barry Sea Cadets

Dave Cranswick (born 15 July 1946) is a former boxer from Wales, who competed at the 1966 British Empire and Commonwealth Games (now Commonwealth Games).

== Biography ==
Cranswick began boxing at the Domino Boxing Club in Barry and later boxing for Roath and was the 1966 Welsh light-middleweight champion.

In May 1966 he represented Wales against France in an International match.

He represented the 1966 Welsh team at the 1966 British Empire and Commonwealth Games in Kingston, Jamaica, participating in the light-middleweight category;

In 1967, boxing for Barry Sea Cadets, he was the Welsh welterweight champion, defeating Geoffrey Cutts in the final and also won the prestigious A.B.A. welterweight title.

Cranswick turned professional in 1968 and fought 22 bouts from 1968 to 1973.

He spent 40 years as a merchant seaman.
