= Luis Romo (boxer) =

Argentine boxer

Personal information
- Nationality: Argentine
- Born: 18 August 1944 (age 80)

Sport
- Sport: Boxing

Luis Romo (born 18 August 1944) is an Argentine boxer. He competed in the men's flyweight event at the 1964 Summer Olympics. At the 1964 Summer Olympics, he lost to Darryl Norwood of Australia.
