= Marcus Dickson =

Sports shooter from Northern Ireland

Personal information
- Nationality: British (Northern Irish)
- Born: c.1928 Northern Ireland

Sport
- Sport: Sports shooting
- Event: 50m rifle prone
- Club: County Londonderry X.B. Rifle Club

Marcus Dickson (born c.1928) is a former sports shooter from Northern Ireland, who competed at the Commonwealth Games.

== Biography ==
Dickson was a grocer and egg exporter, based in Garvagh, County Londonderry and was a member of the County Londonderry X.B. Rifle Club.

He represented Great Britain at small-bore rifle shooting and by 1966 was a six-times champion of Northern Ireland, in addition to five-times U.S.R.A. champion.

Dickson represented the 1966 Northern Irish Team at the 1966 British Empire and Commonwealth Games in Kingston, Jamaica, participating in the 50 metres rifle prone event.

He competed at the 1974 Commonwealth Championships in Scotland and was an accomplished billiards and snooker player, playing for Coleraine at the highest level in Northern Ireland.
