= Northern Ireland at the 1966 British Empire and Commonwealth Games =

- CGF code: NIR
- CGA: Northern Ireland Commonwealth Games Council
- Website: nicgc.org

in Kingston, Jamaica
- Flag bearers: Opening: Closing:
- Medals Ranked =14thth: Gold 1 Silver 3 Bronze 3 Total 7

British Empire and Commonwealth Games appearances
- 1934; 1938; 1950; 1954; 1958; 1962; 1966; 1970; 1974; 1978; 1982; 1986; 1990; 1994; 1998; 2002; 2006; 2010; 2014; 2018; 2022; 2026; 2030

Other related appearances
- Ireland (1930)

Northern Ireland competed at the 1966 British Empire and Commonwealth Games in Kingston, Jamaica, from 4 to 13 August 1966.

Northern Ireland finished 14th in the medal table with one gold medal, three silver medals and three bronze medals.

An initial Northern Irish team of 22 athletes and three officials were named during June 1966.

== Medalists ==
=== Gold ===
- Jim McCourt (boxing)

=== Silver ===
- Mike Bull (Pole vault)
- Paddy Maguire (boxing)
- Mary Peters (Shot put)

=== Bronze ===
- Sammy Lockhart (boxing)
- Danny McAlinden (boxing)
- Frank Young (boxing)

== Team ==
=== Officials ===
- W. J. Goodman (team commandant)
- R. J. McColgan (general team manager)
- H. Enwright (boxing trainer)

=== Athletics ===
Men

Athlete	Events	Club	Medals
Mike Bull	pole vault	Albert Foundry AC	Silver medal
Derek Graham	1 mile, 3 miles	9th Old Boys Harriers, Belfast	
Johnny Kilpatrick	100y, 220y	Ballymena AC	
Stan Vennard	6 miles, marathon	Duncairn Nomads AC	

Women

Athlete	Events	Club	Medals
Lorna McGarvey	100y, 220y	Ballymena AC	
Mary Peters	Shot Put	Ballymena AC	Silver medal

=== Boxing ===
Athlete	Events	Club	Medals
Sammy Lockhart	60 kg lightweight	Achilles BC, Belfast	Bronze medal
Danny McAlinden	91 kg heavyweight	Edgewick Trades Hall ABC	Bronze medal
Jim McAuley	54 kg bantamweight	Immaculata BC, Belfast	
Jim McCourt	63.5 kg light-welterweight	Immaculata BC, Belfast	Gold medal
Eamonn McCusker	71 kg light-middleweight	Banbridge ABC	
Paddy Maguire	57 kg featherweight	South Belfast ABC	Silver medal
Frank Young	67 kg welterweight	Dominic Savio ABC, Belfast	Bronze medal

=== Cycling ===
Athlete	Events	Club	Medals
Steve Chivers	Road race, 10 mile scratch	Cyprus Cycling Club	
Morris Foster	Road race, 10 mile scratch	Cyprus Cycling Club	
Dave Kane	Road race	Northern Cycling Club, Belfast	

=== Shooting ===
Athlete	Events	Club	Medals
Marcus Dickson	50m rifle prone	Co.Derry X.B. Rifle Club	
Ernie Neely	centre fire pistol, Fullbore rifle	Ulster Rifle Association	
Ken Stanford	free pistol, centre fire pistol, rapid fire pistol	Royal Ulster Constabulary	

=== Swimming ===
Men

Athlete	Events	Club	Medals
Liam Ball	110y, 220y breaststroke	City of Derry SC	
Paddy Graham	110y butterfly, 110y freestyle	New Northern ASC, Belfast	

Women

Athlete	Events	Club	Medals
Ruth Graham	110y, 220y breaststroke	New Northern ASC, Belfast	

=== Weightlifting ===
Athlete	Events	Club	Medals
Sammy Dalzell	56 kg bantamweight	Richmond WC	
Alex McAfee	75 kg middleweight	St Gabriel's WC, Belfast	
Paul Ross	67.5 kg lightweight	Baxter's PCS, Belfast	
