= Paddy Graham =

Northern Irish swimmer

Personal information
- Nationality: British (Northern Irish)
- Born: c.1947 Northern Ireland

Sport
- Sport: Swimming
- Events: Butterfly, Freestyle
- Club: New Northern ASC, Belfast

Paddy Graham (born c.1947) is a former swimmer from Northern Ireland, who represented Northern Ireland at the British Empire and Commonwealth Games (now Commonwealth Games).

== Biography ==
Graham was a member of the New Northern Amateur Swimming Club in Belfast.

In February 1965 while still at school, he was selected in the initial list of swimmers for the forthcoming Empire Games. Shortly afterwards, the Royal Belfast Academical Institution pupil won the Ulster Swimmer of the Year, after winning the 100, 200 and 400 freestyle at the Ulster Championships.

Graham also excelled at water polo and represented Ireland at international level. In 1966 he studied electrical engineering at Queen's University Belfast.

Graham represented the 1966 Northern Irish Team at the 1966 British Empire and Commonwealth Games in Kingston, Jamaica, participating in the 110 yards butterfly and 110 yards freestyle events. His younger sister Ruth Graham was an international swimmer and also competed at the Games.

In November 1966 Graham became the assistant to the club coach and his father Robert was appointed President of the New Northern ASC.
