= Wales at the 1966 British Empire and Commonwealth Games =

- CG code: WAL
- CGA: Wales at the Commonwealth Games
- Website: teamwales.cymru

in Kingston, Jamaica
- Flag bearers: Opening: Closing:
- Medals Ranked 11th: Gold 3 Silver 2 Bronze 2 Total 7

British Empire and Commonwealth Games appearances
- 1930; 1934; 1938; 1950; 1954; 1958; 1962; 1966; 1970; 1974; 1978; 1982; 1986; 1990; 1994; 1998; 2002; 2006; 2010; 2014; 2018; 2022; 2026; 2030

Wales competed at the 1966 British Empire and Commonwealth Games in Kingston, Jamaica, from 4 to 13 August 1966.

Wales finished 11th in the medal table with three gold medals, two silver medals and two bronze medals.

Forty-nine athletes were nominated in June 1966 to take part in the Games.

== Medalists ==
=== Gold ===
- Lynn Davies, long jump
- John Vivian, shooting
- Chung Kum Weng, weightlifting

=== Silver ===
- Clive Longe, decathlon
- Horace Johnson, weightlifting

=== Bronze ===
- Robert Reynolds, fencing
- Ieuan Owen, weightlifting

== Team ==
=== Athletics ===
Men

Athlete	Events	Club	Medals
Howard Davies	220y, 440y	Swansea University AC	
Lynn Davies	Long jump, 220y, relay	Roath Harriers, Cardiff	Gold medal
Terry Davies	100y, 220y, relay	Carmarthen Harriers	
Tony Harris	880y, 1 mile	Mitcham AC	
Roy Hart	20 miles walk	Royal Air Force	
Ron Jones	100y, relay	Enfield Harriers	
Keri Jones	100y, 220y, relay	Cardiff C.o.E	
Clive Longe	Decathlon, Shot put	Royal Air Force	Silver medal

Women

Athlete	Events	Club	Medals
Thelwyn Appleby	100y, 220y, 440y, relay	Coventry Godiva Harriers	
Gloria Dourass	100y, 220y, 440y, relay	Small Heath Harriers, Birmingham	
Liz Gill	110y, 220y, relay	Glamorgan C.o.E	
Liz Parsons	100y, 220y, relay	Roath Harriers, Cardiff	

=== Badminton ===
Athlete	Events	Club	Medals
Howard Jennings	singles, doubles	Steinberg BC, Hawthorn	
Peter Seaman	singles, doubles	Steinberg BC, Hawthorn	

=== Boxing ===
Athlete	Events	Club	Medals
Maurice Aldridge	51kg flyweight	Splott YMCA, Cardiff	
Dave Cranswick	71kg light-middleweight	Barry Sea Cadets	
Geoffrey Cutts	63.5kg light-welterweight	British Army	
Tommy Dwyer	57kg featherweight	Roath Youth ABC	
Reg Perry	60kg lightweight	Roath Vale BC	

=== Cycling ===
Athlete	Events	Club	Medals
John Dyer	Scratch, Sprint, Time trial	Abercynon CC	
Colin Lewis	Road race, Pursuit	Mid-Devon Cycling Club	
Roger Pratt	Road race, Pursuit	Cardiff Ajax	
Eddie Smart	Road race, Scratch, Sprint, Time trial, Pursuit	Polytechnic	

=== Diving ===
Men

Athlete	Events	Club	Medals
David Priestley	Springboard, Platform	City of Cardiff	

Women

Athlete	Events	Club	Medals
Mandi Haswell	Springboard, Platform	Cardiff S.C.	

=== Fencing ===
Men

Athlete	Events	Club	Medals
John N. McGrath	Épée, Sabre	Salle Reynolds Fencing Club	
Andrew Reynolds	Foil, Sabre, team foil	Salle Reynolds Fencing Club	
Robert Reynolds	Épée, Foil, team foil	Salle Reynolds Fencing Club	Bronze medal
Duncan R. Turner	Épée, Foil, Sabre, team foil	Salle Reynolds Fencing Club	

Women

Athlete	Events	Club	Medals
Julia Davis	Foil, team foil	Salle Reynolds Fencing Club	
Angela M. Julian	Foil, team foil	Salle Reynolds Fencing Club	
Frances Reynolds	Foil, team foil	Salle Reynolds Fencing Club	

=== Shooting ===
Men

Athlete	Events	Club	Medals
Thomas W. Dunn	50m fifle prone		
Douglas D. Dyer	50m fifle prone		
Robert S. Hassall	Centre fire pistol, Rapid fire pistol	Royal Air Force	
John Pryor	Fullbore rifle		
John Vivian	Fullbore rifle		Gold medal

=== Swimming ===
Men

Athlete	Events	Club	Medals
Hugh Jenkins	110, 220y breaststroke, relay	Newport Swimming Club	
Roddy Jones	110y, 220y backstroke, 2x relay	Newport Swimming Club	
Alun Lewis	110y freestyle, relay	St James' Swimming Club, London	
Kevan Moran	110y freestyle, relay	Swansea Swimming Club	
Keith Ross	110y freestyle, 2 x relay	Ilford Swimming Club, London	
Martyn Woodroffe	110y, 220y butterfly, 440y medley, relay	Cardiff Swimming Club	

Women

Athlete	Events	Club	Medals
Julie Bevan	110y, 220y backstroke	Newport Swimming Club	
Glenda Phillips	110y, 220y butterfly	Swansea Swimming Club	

=== Weightlifting ===
Athlete	Events	Club	Medals
Peter Arthur	82.5kg light-heavyweight	Samurai WC, Swansea	
Horace Johnson	75kg middleweight	Rhyl Barbell WC	Silver medal
Ieuan Owen	67.5kg lightweight	Llanrug AWC	Bronze medal
Terry Perdue	110kg heavyweight	Samurai WC, Swansea	
Chung Kum Weng	60kg featherweight	Cardiff Youths	Gold medal
