= Johnny Clark =

British boxer (1947–2020)

Personal information
- Nationality: British (English)
- Born: 10 September 1947 Walworth, London, England
- Died: 28 December 2020 (aged 73)
- Weight: Bantamweight

Boxing career
- Club: Robert Browning ABC, London

Boxing record
- Total fights: 43
- Wins: 39
- Win by KO: 27
- Losses: 3
- Draws: 1

Johnny A Clark (10 September 1947 – 28 December 2020) was a British boxer who won the British and European bantamweight titles in 1973.

== Career ==
=== Amateur career ===
As an amateur he represented England in the flyweight division at the 1966 British Empire and Commonwealth Games in Kingston, Jamaica.

He won the 1966 Amateur Boxing Association British bantamweight title, when boxing out of the Robert Browning ABC.

== Professional career ==
From Walworth in London, Clark made his professional debut in October 1966, fighting a draw against Tommy Connor.

Trained by Charlie Page at the Thomas a Becket gym, he won his next 27 fights, and in April 1970 faced Alan Rudkin for the British bantamweight title and the vacant Commonwealth bantamweight title at the Royal Albert Hall. Rudkin stopped him in the twelfth round to take both titles. In April 1971 he faced John Kellie in a final eliminator for the British title; He was stopped in the second round, but six months later they met again, with Clark stopping Kellie in the eighth. This led to a challenge for Rudkin's British and Commonwealth titles in January 1972; The fight went the full 15 rounds, with Rudkin retaining the titles by half a point.

Clark got a third shot at the British title in 1973 after Rudkin had vacated it. He faced Paddy Maguire at the Royal Albert Hall, winning on points to become British champion.

In April 1973 he added the European title, beating Franco Zurlo by unanimous decision. He successfully defended the title in January 1974, beating Salvatore Fabrizio by majority decision.

He beat Chuck Spencer in March 1974, and Luigi Tessarin in May, but in the absence of adequate purse offers, relinquished his British title, and in August 1974 was forced to retire due to a detached retina in his right eye, while still the reigning European champion.

Clark died in December 2020 at the age of 73.
