= John Kellie =

Scottish boxer

Personal information
- Nationality: British (Scottish)
- Born: c.1946 Dundee, Scotland

Sport
- Sport: Boxing
- Event: Flyweight
- Club: Dundee ABC

John Kellie (c.1946) is a former boxer from Scotland who competed at the 1966 British Empire and Commonwealth Games (now Commonwealth Games).

== Biography ==
Kellie, born in Dundee, Scotland, was a toffee factory worker in 1966 and boxed out of the Dundee Amateur Boxing Club. He was a Scottish bantamweight champion.

Kellie represented the Scottish Empire and Commonwealth Games team at the 1966 British Empire and Commonwealth Games in Kingston, Jamaica, participating in the 51kg flyweight category.

However, he failed to make the weight in his quarter-final bout against Canadian Frank Scott and was eliminated. Towards the end of the Games, Kellie and fellow Scottish team member Andy Peace were blamed for setting off fireworks in the athletes village and were sent home early from the Games. They denied that they set off the fireworks.

Kellie turned professional on 11 November 1968 and fought in 33 bouts.
