= Maurice Aldridge =

Welsh boxer

Personal information
- Nationality: British (Welsh)
- Born: c.1946 Cardiff, Wales

Sport
- Sport: Boxing
- Event: Flyweight
- Club: St Dyfrig's ABC Cardiff; Splott YMCA, Cardiff

Maurice A. Aldridge (born c.1946) is a former boxer from Wales, who competed at the 1966 British Empire and Commonwealth Games (now Commonwealth Games).

== Biography ==
Aldridge's first year as a senior boxer was in 1964 and boxing for St Dyfrig's Amateur Boxing Club in Cardiff, he won the Welsh bantamweight championship.

In 1966 he was boxing out of Splott YMCA in Cardiff and in May 1966 he represented Wales against France in an International match.

He represented the 1966 Welsh team at the 1966 British Empire and Commonwealth Games in Kingston, Jamaica, participating in the flyweight category;

He continued to represent Wales after the Games.
