= Jim McAuley =

Northern Irish boxer

Personal information
- Nationality: British (Northern Irish)
- Born: c.1947 Northern Ireland

Sport
- Sport: Boxing
- Event: Bantamweight
- Club: Immaculata BC, Belfast

Jim McAuley (born c.1947) is a former boxer from Northern Ireland, who represented Northern Ireland at the British Empire and Commonwealth Games (now Commonwealth Games).

== Biography ==
McAuley was a paper cutter by profession in 1966 and a member of the Immaculata Amateur Boxing Club in Belfast. He represented Ireland at international level.

In April 1966 he won the Ulster senior chamionship, which helped him gain selection by the Empire Games committee for the forthcoming Games.

McAuley represented the 1966 Northern Irish Team at the 1966 British Empire and Commonwealth Games in Kingston, Jamaica, participating in the 54kg bantamweight category.

McAuley turned professional in 1967 and boxed in 20 bouts between 1967 and 1977.
