= Sabina Park =

Cricket ground in Kingston, Jamaica

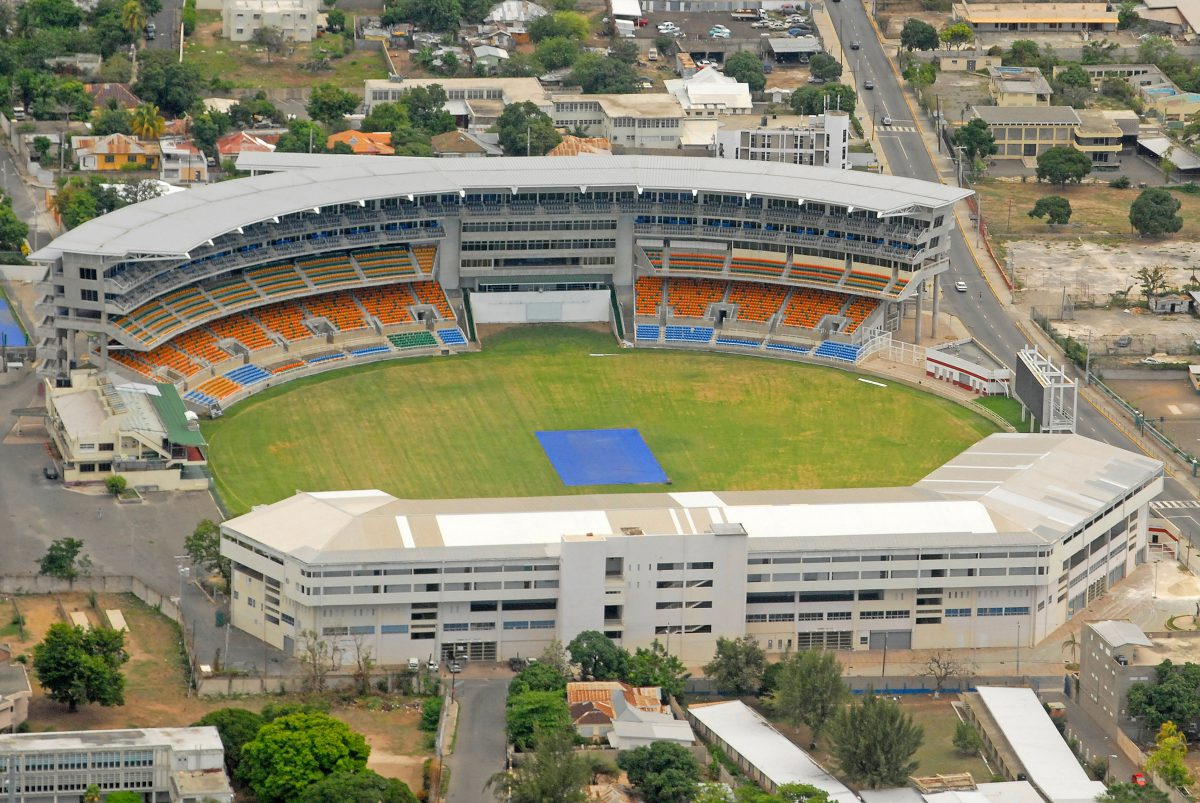
- Sabina Park in 2022
- Interactive map of Sabina Park

Ground information
- Location: Kingston, Jamaica
- Country: Jamaica
- Coordinates: 17°58′40″N 76°46′57″W
- Establishment: 1895
- Capacity: 15,600
- Tenants: Jamaica cricket team
- End names
- Michael Holding End; Courtney Walsh End

International information
- First men's Test: 3–12 April 1930: West Indies v England
- Last men's Test: 12–14 July 2025: West Indies v Australia
- First men's ODI: 26 April 1984: West Indies v Australia
- Last men's ODI: 03 June 2026: West Indies v Sri Lanka
- First men's T20I: 19 February 2014: West Indies v Ireland
- Last men's T20I: 23 July 2025: West Indies v Australia
- Only women's Test: 14–16 May 1976: West Indies v Australia
- First women's ODI: 6 October 2013: West Indies v New Zealand
- Last women's ODI: 19 October 2016: West Indies v England

Team information
Jamaica	(1895 – present)
Jamaica Tallawahs	(2013 – 2023)
- As of 03 June 2026; Source: ESPNcricinfo

Sabina Park is a cricket ground in Kingston, Jamaica. It is the home of the Jamaica cricket team and is the only Test cricket ground in Jamaica.

== History ==
Sabina Park was originally a Pen, the urban residence and adjoining land of a wealthy merchant, shopkeeper or professional. The entire estate was 30 acres (12 hectares). Part of the land was sold to the Kingston Cricket Club for their ground. The Great House at Sabina Park Pen was named Rosemount.

=== Sabina Park Pen ===
Higman and Hudson state that the name is a "transfer name", i.e. a name copied from somewhere else, in this case "the region around Rome" of Magliano Sabina.

Shalman Scott, writing in the Jamaica Observer, reported that:

Sabina Park murdered her four-month-old child and in her deposition in the Half-Way-Tree court, admitted that she had killed her child- and proceeded to give her reason for doing so. Sabina's complaint, according to the Crown witness, was that “she had worked enough for 'Backra' (Master) already and that she would not be plagued to raise the child…to work for white people”.

[She] was found guilty of murder by the court and hanged. She was buried on the Liguanea Plain at a place that bore, in perpetuity, her name — Sabina Park.

Sabina Park, the slave, was owned by Joseph Gordon, father of National Hero George William Gordon. She was one of 17 slaves on Goat Island, a property also owned by Joseph Gordon, a Scottish planter who was given huge acreage of land in Jamaica after the restoration of the Monarchy in England, by King Charles II...

Known ownership of Sabina Park Pen includes:

Dates	Owner	Notes
1809-1820	Isabella Hall	Free woman of colour. Died c. 1822, partner of Robert Rainford senior (q.v.) with whom she had two sons, Robert and Samuel. Probably the daughter of Elizabeth Pinnock, "a free Negro woman" by Oliver Hall, born 05/02/1762 and baptised 16/06/1762 in Kingston, Jamaica. In her will she manumitted several enslaved people and divided her property between her nieces and her two sons, adding "All my wearing apparel to be equally divided among my slave relations."
1823-c1825	Netlam Tory	A merchant in Liverpool, partner in Tory, Holt (q.v.) who apparently moved to Britain from Kingston Jamaica in the early 1830s.
1825-1830	William Titley	Resident merchant of Kingston Jamaica, dying there in 1851.
1839-18??	Robert Fairweather	Resident planting attorney and slave-owner.
18??-1???	Ellen Agnes Hill née Blakely; Albert Maurice Hill (spouse)	Ellen Hill was the vendor of the land sold to Kingston Cricket Club.

=== Sabina Park Cricket Ground ===
From 1880, Sabina Park was rented by Kingston Cricket Club from Mrs. Blakely, the then owner, for an annual fee of £27. That arrangement continued until 27 November 1890 when the land was purchased for £750.

Sabina Park became a Test cricket ground in 1930 when it hosted the visiting MCC team for the fourth and final Test in the West Indies' first home series.

The picturesque ground is perhaps one of the most significant in Test cricket history recording the first triple century in the game with England's Andy Sandham's 325 versus the West Indies in the 1930 game. The 365 not out by Sir Garfield Sobers which stood as a Test record for over 36 years is also regaled, as is Lawrence Rowe's world record on debut 214 and 100 not out against the visiting New Zealand in 1972.

Sabina Park was the venue for the abandoned test in 1998 involving the touring England team. The test was abandoned after less than an hour's play due to the pitch being deemed unfit for play.

Prior to Independence Park opening in 1962, Sabina Park hosted the Jamaica national football team.

The venue hosted the preliminary rounds of the boxing events at the 1966 British Empire and Commonwealth Games.

== Facilities ==
The members pavilion lies square of the wicket on the west side.

The Blue Mountains form a backdrop to the north, facing the George Headley Stand, with Kingston Harbour to the south. This view is currently blocked by the Northern Stand, built as part of the ground's redevelopment for the 2007 Cricket World Cup.

The George Headley stand which dominates the south end is currently the only stand in the ground named after anyone, and has a capacity of just over 6,000. The Eastern Stands has given way to a "Party Stand" replacing the popular "Mound" stand. The general capacity of Jamaicans for excess is aptly demonstrated in the construction of the huge five-level concrete stand which hosts the outside broadcast facilities, players facilities as well as a fleet of upscale private boxes.

In terms of size, Sabina Park is still relatively small. It can fit a 400-metre running track comfortably on its perimeter, but little else, and with its refurbishing, the capacity has increased to 20,000.

With the commissioning of floodlights in August 2014, Sabina Park became the last of the international grounds in the Caribbean to have this facility. The ground is now capable of hosting day/night matches and this is especially useful for the Caribbean Premier League where the Jamaica Tallawahs played their home games.

A mural featuring 19 famous Jamaican cricketers was installed outside the ground in 2021.

== See also ==
- List of Test cricket grounds
