= Geoffrey Cutts =

Welsh boxer

Personal information
- Nationality: British (Welsh)
- Born: Q3.1948 Cardiff, Wales

Sport
- Sport: Boxing
- Event: Light-welterweight
- Club: British Army BC; Roath Vale BC

Ian Geoffrey Cutts (born c.1948) is a former boxer from Wales, who competed at the 1966 British Empire and Commonwealth Games (now Commonwealth Games).

== Biography ==
Cutts was educated at Penarth Secondary Modern School and was the Welsh Schools' boxing champion for four consecutive years from 1960 to 1963. In 1965, he lived in Penarth and boxed out of St. Athan in Barry, while serving with the Junior Tradesmen's Regiment at Kinmel Camp in Rhyl.

In May 1966 he represented Wales against France in an International match.

He represented the 1966 Welsh team at the 1966 British Empire and Commonwealth Games in Kingston, Jamaica, participating in the light-welterweight category;

He continued to represent Wales after the Games and in 1967 he was Welsh Championships runner-up to Dave Cranswick and in 1969 he was boxing for Roath Vale and was the Army and Imperial Services champion at welterweight.
