= Moira Kerr =

Scottish athlete

Personal information
- Nationality: British (Scottish)
- Born: c.1946

Sport
- Sport: Athletics
- Event: Shot put
- Club: Maryhill Ladies Athletic Club

Moira Kerr (born c.1946) is a former track and field athlete from Scotland who competed at the 1966 British Empire and Commonwealth Games (now Commonwealth Games).

== Biography ==
Kerr was a member of the Maryhill Ladies Athletic Club and broke the Scottish shot put record with a throw of 43 feet, 4.5 inches, in May 1964.

Kerr represented the Scottish Empire and Commonwealth Games team at the 1966 British Empire and Commonwealth Games in Kingston, Jamaica, participating in one event, the shot put event.

Kerr was a four-times Scottish champion in the shot put, winning the Scottish AAA Championship title in 1963, 1964, 1966 and 1967.
