= Eamonn McCusker =

Irish boxer

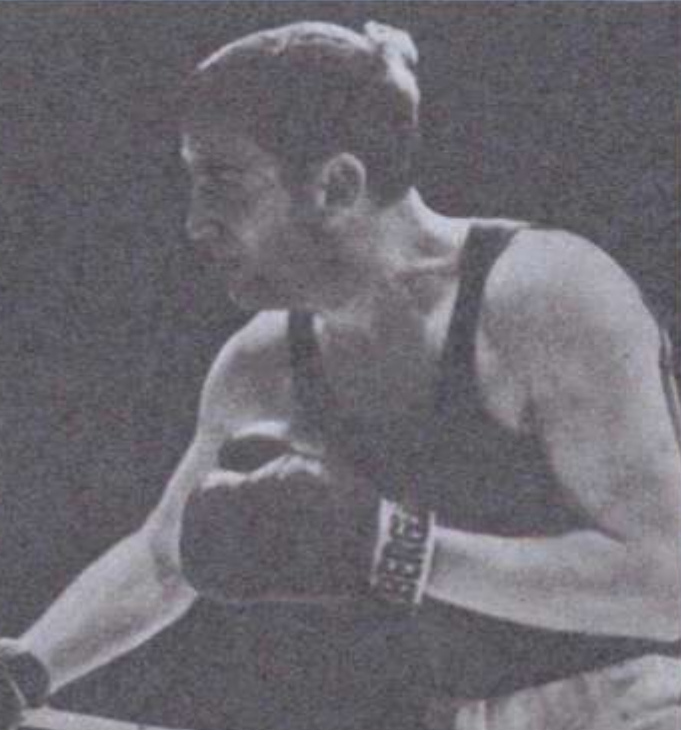

Personal information
- Nationality: British (Northern Irish)
- Born: 20 August 1945 (age 80) Banbridge, Northern Ireland
- Height: 173 cm (5 ft 8 in)
- Weight: 71 kg (157 lb)

Sport
- Sport: Boxing
- Event: Light-middleweight
- Club: Banbridge ABC; St. John Bosco ABC, Belfast

Eamonn Henry McCusker (born 20 August 1945) is an Irish boxer who competed at the 1968 Summer Olympics.

== Biography ==
McCusker was a member of the Banbridge Boxing Club and the St. John Bosco Amateur Boxing Club in Belfast.

McCusker represented the 1966 Northern Irish Team at the 1966 British Empire and Commonwealth Games in Kingston, Jamaica, participating in the 71kg light-middleweight category.

At the 1968 Olympic Games in Mexico City, he participated in the men's light middleweight event, where he lost to Rolando Garbey of Cuba.
