= Ken Cooper (boxer) =

English boxer (born 1943)

Personal information
- Nationality: British (English)
- Born: 20 October 1943 (age 82) Birmingham, England

Sport
- Club: Kyrle Hall ABC, Birmingham

Kenneth "Ken" J. Cooper (born 20 October 1943) is an English former boxer.

== Boxing career ==
Cooper was a member of the Kyrle Hall ABC, in Birmingham and was the 1967 featherweight ABA champion, which was regarded as the UK National Championships at the time. The success included a win over Ken Buchanan. He had finished runner-up the previous year in 1966.

Cooper represented England in tournaments with the highlight being selection for the Commonwealth Games. He represented the England team at the 1966 British Empire and Commonwealth Games in Kingston, Jamaica where he competed in the 57kg featherweight category.

Cooper made his professional debut on 14 November 1967. and fought in 17 fights until 1970.
