= Reg Perry =

Welsh boxer

Personal information
- Nationality: British (Welsh)
- Born: c.1936 Cardiff, Wales

Sport
- Sport: Boxing
- Event: Lightweight
- Club: Roath Vale BC

Reginald D. Perry (born c.1936) is a former boxer from Wales, who competed at the 1966 British Empire and Commonwealth Games (now Commonwealth Games).

== Biography ==
Perry was a member of the Roath Vale Boxing Club and in November 1963 he represented Wales against Germany in an International match. In 1965 he was boxing at lightweight and in May 1966 competed for Wales against France in an International match.

He represented the 1966 Welsh team at the 1966 British Empire and Commonwealth Games in Kingston, Jamaica, participating in the lightweight category;

He continued to compete for Wales at international level after the Games.
