= Bobby Porteous =

Scottish boxer

Personal information
- Nationality: British (Scottish)
- Born: c.1942

Sport
- Sport: Boxing
- Event: Lightweight
- Club: Ormiston Welfare ABC

Robert "Bobby" Porteous (born c.1942) is a former boxer from Scotland who competed at the 1966 British Empire and Commonwealth Games (now Commonwealth Games).

== Biography ==
Porteous boxed out of the Ormiston Welfare Amateur Boxing Club, was a British youth bantamweight champion and was capped by Scotland during the 1959/60 season.

He was still fighting for Scotland during 1964 before he retired. After retiring from boxing for two years, he returned in 1966 to win the Scottish lightweight title.

Porteous represented the Scottish Empire and Commonwealth Games team at the 1966 British Empire and Commonwealth Games in Kingston, Jamaica, participating in the 60kg lightweight category.
