= Dick Findlay =

Canadian boxer

Dick Findlay is a Canadian boxer who represented Canada in the 1968 Summer Olympic Games.

== Early career ==
In 1966 and 1967, Findlay was the first boxer to earn back-to-back "Golden Boy" awards in the BC Golden Gloves. He also boxed in the 1967 International Diamond Belt Centennial Boxing Championship hosted by the Rajah and Burnaby Shrine Clubs at the PNE Agrodome in Vancouver. After earning a decision over Nicky McDonald in the finals of the 1968 BC Golden Gloves, he was named BC Golden Boy runner-up in 1968.

== Commonwealth, Pan-American and Olympic Games ==
In 1966, Findlay competed in the British Empire and Commonwealth Games. In 1967, Findlay was a member of the Canadian Pan American Games Boxing Team. In 1968 he was a member of the Canadian Olympic boxing team.

== 1968 Olympic results ==
Below is the record of Richard (Dick) Findlay, a Canadian light welterweight boxer who competed at the 1968 Mexico City Olympics:

- Round of 64: lost to Giambattista Capretti (Italy) referee stopped contest

== British Columbia Amateur Boxing Hall Of Fame ==
In September 2010, Findlay was named as one of 15 first ever inductees into the British Columbia Amateur Boxing Hall Of Fame.
