= Roger Tighe =

English boxer (1944–2022)

Personal information
- Nationality: British (English)
- Born: 23 July 1944 Hull, England
- Died: 1 July 2022 (aged 77)

Sport
- Sport: Boxing
- Event: Light-heavyweight
- Club: Hull Boys' Club
Medal record
Boxing
Representing England
British Empire & Commonwealth Games
Gold medal – first place	1966 Kingston	81 kg light-heavyweight

Roger Stephen Tighe (23 July 1944 – 1 July 2022) was a boxer who competed for England.

== Boxing career ==
Tighe won the prestigious Amateur Boxing Association 1966 light heavyweight title, when boxing out of the Hull Boys Boxing Club.

Tighe represented The England team and won a gold medal in the 81 kg light-heavyweight, at the 1966 British Empire and Commonwealth Games in Kingston, Jamaica.

He made his professional debut on 24 October 1966 and fought in 38 fights until 1976.

== Personal life ==
Tighe died in July 2022, at the age of 77.
