= Andy Peace =

Scottish boxer

Personal information
- Nationality: British (Scottish)
- Born: 28 January 1945 Lochore, Scotland
- Died: 29 June 2009 (aged 64)

Sport
- Sport: Boxing
- Event: Welterweight
- Club: Fife & Clackmannan Miners ABC
Medal record
Men's boxing
Representing Scotland
Commonwealth Games
Bronze medal – third place	1966 Kingston	welterweight

Andrew Peace (28 January 1945 – 29 June 2009) was a boxer from Scotland who competed at the 1966 British Empire and Commonwealth Games (now Commonwealth Games).

== Biography ==
Peace, born in Lochore, Scotland, boxed out of the Fife & Clackmannan Miners Amateur Boxing Club. He was the 1965 Scottish champion.

Peace represented the Scottish Empire and Commonwealth Games team at the 1966 British Empire and Commonwealth Games in Kingston, Jamaica, participating in the 67kg welterweight category. He won the bronze medal.

Towards the end of the Games, Peace and fellow Scottish team member John Kellie were blamed for setting off fireworks in the athletes village and were sent home early from the Games. They denied that they set off the fireworks.

Peace turned professional on 18 February 1969 and fought in 16 bouts. After retiring he ran the Exit Boxing Club in Glenrothes. He died in 2009 at the age of 64.
