= Ron Thurston =

Former boxer who competed for England

Personal information
- Nationality: British (English)
- Born: 20 August 1945 Warrington, England
- Died: 24 July 2023 (aged 77) Warrington, England

Sport
- Sport: Boxing
- Event: Lightweight
- Club: Raven BC, Warrington
Medal record
Boxing
Representing England
British Empire & Commonwealth Games
Silver medal – second place	1966 Kingston	60 kg lightweight

Ronald "Ron" Vincent Thurston (20 August 1945 – 24 July 2023), was a boxer who competed for England.

== Boxing career ==
Thurston was educated at St Augustine's RC Primary School, St John's RC Secondary Modern. He was a member of the Raven Boxing Club in Warrington, which was run by father and son duo, Herbie and young Herbie Goulding.

He represented the England team and won a silver medal in the 60 kg lightweight, at the 1966 British Empire and Commonwealth Games in Kingston, Jamaica.

Four years later he represented England again at the 1970 British Commonwealth Games in Edinburgh, Scotland.

By profession he worked for the James & Nuttall Engineering Company, where he was an engineer. He fought in 120 amateur contests and won 97 of them.

Thurston died in 2023 aged 77.
