= Raymond Maguire =

Australian boxer

Personal information
- Nationality: Australian
- Born: 1 December 1944 (age 80); Queensland, Australia

Sport
- Sport: Boxing

Raymond Maguire (born 1 December 1944) is an Australian boxer. He competed in the men's light welterweight event at the 1968 Summer Olympics.
