= Alex Oundo =

Kenyan boxer

Personal information
- Nationality: Kenyan
- Born: 10 December 1943 (age 81)

Sport
- Sport: Boxing

Alex Oundo (born 10 December 1943) is a Kenyan boxer. He competed in the men's lightweight event at the 1964 Summer Olympics. At the 1964 Summer Olympics, he defeated Bruno Arcari of Italy, before losing to Józef Grudzień of Poland.
