= Frank Young (boxer) =

Northern Irish boxer

Personal information
- Nationality: British (Northern Irish)
- Born: c.1947 Belfast, Northern Ireland
- Died: 20 March 2020 Lisburn, Northern Ireland

Sport
- Sport: Boxing
- Event: Welterweight
- Club: Dominic Savio ABC, Belfast
Medal record
Representing Northern Ireland
British Empire and Commonwealth Games
Bronze medal – third place	1966 Kingston	welterweight

Frank Young (c.1947 – 20 March 2020) was a boxer from Northern Ireland, who represented Northern Ireland at the British Empire and Commonwealth Games (now Commonwealth Games).

== Biography ==
Young was a member of the Dominic Savio Amateur Boxing Club in Belfast, and was the Ulster junior welterweight champion in 1964.

In April 1966, he won his fight against a Scotland select team, which helped him gain selection by the Empire Games committee for the forthcoming Games.

Young represented the 1966 Northern Irish Team at the 1966 British Empire and Commonwealth Games in Kingston, Jamaica, participating in the 67kg welterweight category and won a bronze medal.

He turned professional in 1968 and fought in 40 bouts from 1968 to 1974. He died on 20 March 2020.
