= Mark Rowe (boxer) =

English boxer (1947–2021)

Personal information
- Nationality: British (English)
- Born: 12 July 1947 Camberwell, England
- Died: 27 December 2021 (aged 74)
- Height: 5 ft 10 in (178 cm)
- Weight: light middle/middle/light heavyweight

Boxing career
- Club: Fitzropy Lodge ABC

Boxing record
- Total fights: 47
- Wins: 38 (KO 28)
- Losses: 8 (KO 5)
- Draws: 1
Medal record
Boxing
Representing England
British Empire & Commonwealth Games
Gold medal – first place	1966 Kingston	71 kg light-middleweight

Mark Rowe (12 July 1947 – 27 December 2021) was an amateur light middleweight and professional light middle/middle/light heavyweight boxer from England.

== Boxing career ==
As an amateur he was runner-up for the 1966 Amateur Boxing Association of England Light middleweight (71 kg) title, against Tom Imrie (Bucchleuch BC). boxing out of Fitzroy Lodge ABC.

He represented the England team and won a gold medal at light middleweight beating Tom (Scotland) in the boxing at the 1966 British Empire and Commonwealth Games in Kingston, Jamaica.

As a professional he won the British Boxing Board of Control (BBBofC) British middleweight, and Commonwealth middleweight title, and was a challenger for the BBBofC British middleweight title against Bunny Sterling, his professional fighting weight varied from 154 lb (70 kg; 11 st 0 lb), i.e. light middleweight to 162 lb (73 kg; 11 st 8 lb), i.e. light heavyweight.
