= Roger Pratt (cyclist) =

Welsh cyclist (born 1944)

Personal information
- Born: 1944 (age 81–82) Cardiff, Wales

Cycling career
- Sport: Cycling
- Disciplines: Track & Road
- Role: Rider

Amateur team
- Britannia team (1965); Cardiff Ajax

Major wins
- Welsh Road Race Champion (1965)

Roger T. Pratt (born 1944) is a former cyclist from Wales.

== Biography ==
Pratt began road racing in 1962, winning his first event the following year.

In 1965 he rode the Tour of Britain Milk Race for the Britannia team (after one of the French riders dropped out). Drug testing was introduced for the first time in this race and Pratt was tested twice.

Pratt became the Welsh Road Race Champion in 1965. He rode the Tour of Britain Milk Race again in 1966 in the Midlands team of Hugh Porter and Les West.

He represented the 1966 Welsh team at the 1966 British Empire and Commonwealth Games in Kingston, Jamaica, participating in the road race and pursuit events.

After five years of competition in the United Kingdom he retired from competition aged only 23, in 1967. Pratt raced again briefly in 1988 when he became Welsh Veterans Road Race Champion.
