= Sammy Lockhart =

Northern Irish boxer

Personal information
- Nationality: British (Northern Irish)
- Born: c.1946 Northern Ireland
- Died: 16 May 2011 Lisburn, Northern Ireland

Sport
- Sport: Boxing
- Event: Lightweight
- Club: Lisburn ABC; Achilles BC, Belfast
Medal record
Representing Northern Ireland
British Empire and Commonwealth Games
Bronze medal – third place	1966 Kingston	lightweight

Samuel Lockhart (1946 – 16 May 2011) was a boxer from Northern Ireland, who represented Northern Ireland at the British Empire and Commonwealth Games (now Commonwealth Games).

== Biography ==
Lockhart from Lisburn, a southpaw, was a member of the Lisburn Amateur Boxing Club and later the Achilles Amateur Boxing Club in Belfast.

In 1963 he was an apprentice plumber and won four Ulster Juvenile titles in 1957, 1960, 1961 and 1963 and three Ulster Senior titles in 1965, 1966 and 1967, which helped him gain selection by the Empire Games committee for the forthcoming Games.

Lockhart represented the 1966 Northern Irish Team at the 1966 British Empire and Commonwealth Games in Kingston, Jamaica, participating in the 60kg lightweight category and won a bronze medal.

He died at Hancock Street in Lisburn during on 16 May 2011.
