= Bobby Arthur =

English boxer (1947–2023)

Personal information
- Nationality: British (English)
- Born: 25 July 1947 Coventry, England
- Died: 27 July 2023 (aged 76) Coventry, England
- Weight: Welterweight, light middleweight

Boxing career
- Club: Coventry Irish ABC

Boxing record
- Total fights: 41
- Wins: 26
- Win by KO: 6
- Losses: 15
Medal record
Boxing
Representing England
British Empire & Commonwealth Games
Silver medal – second place	1966 Kingston	welterweight -67 Kg

Robert Arthur (25 July 1947 – 27 July 2023) was a British boxer who was national welterweight champion between 1972 and 1973.

== Career ==
From Coventry, Bobby Arthur had a successful amateur career, including representing the England team and winning a silver medal at welterweight at the 1966 British Empire and Commonwealth Games, in Kingston, Jamaica. He made his professional debut in March 1967 with a win over Pat Walsh. He won his first 14 fights before suffering his first defeat in November 1969 to former British lightweight champion Maurice Cullen. He won only two of seven fights in 1970, but a win over Ernest Musso in May 1971 started a run of three consecutive wins, which led to a fight against John H. Stracey in October 1972 for the vacant British welterweight title at the Royal Albert Hall. Stracey was disqualified in the seventh round for punching after the referee had called a break, giving Arthur the title.

Arthur and Stracey met again for the title at the same venue in June 1973; This time Stracey was the winner via a fourth-round knockout.

Arthur then moved up to light middleweight to face Larry Paul for the newly created British title in September 1973. Paul knocked Arthur out in the tenth round to take the title.

Arthur was out of the ring for over a year, returning with a loss to Jeff Gale in December 1974. He continued until late 1976 but won only three more fights.

== Death ==
Bobby Arthur died from lung cancer in Coventry on 27 July 2023, just after his 76th birthday.
