= Bill Kini =

New Zealand boxer

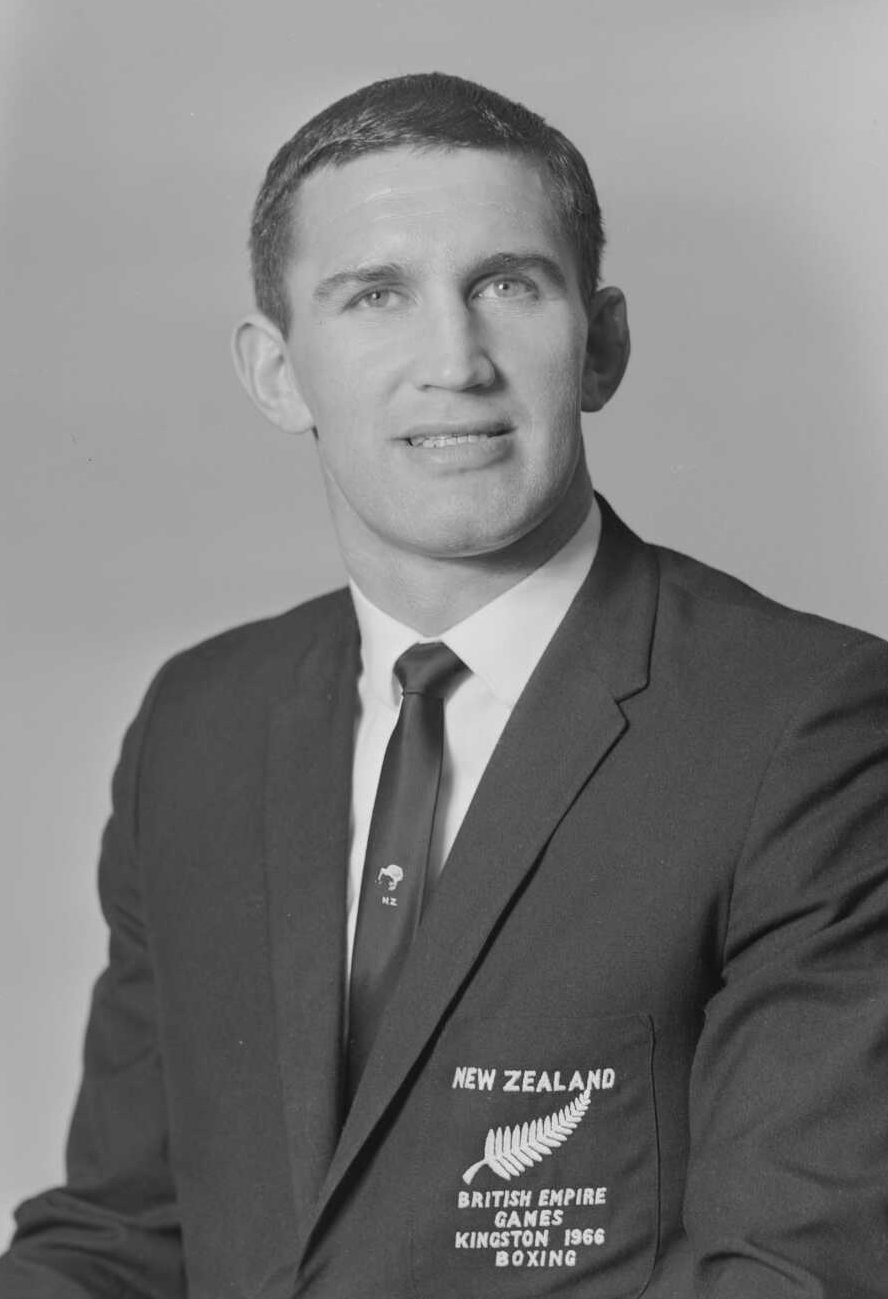

Personal information
- Born: 9 July 1937 Winton, New Zealand
- Died: 30 August 2012 (aged 75) Whangārei, New Zealand

Sport
- Sport: Boxing
Medal record
Representing New Zealand
Men's boxing
British Empire Games
Gold medal – first place	1966 Kingston	Heavyweight
Silver medal – second place	1962 Perth	Heavyweight

William George Kini (9 July 1937 – 30 August 2012) was a New Zealand heavyweight boxer and rugby union prop. He won a gold medal for boxing at the 1966 British Empire and Commonwealth Games and placed second in the 1962 British Empire and Commonwealth Games.

== Biography ==
Kini was born in Winton in 1937. Of Ngāi Tahu descent, he was educated at Southland Technical College in Invercargill.

Kini won the first of his eight New Zealand heavyweight boxing titles in 1959 representing Southland. He then went on to win a further 7 National Heavyweight titles from 1961 through to his last in 1967. Still a standing record for the Heavyweight division.

Kini was selected for the 1962 British Empire and Commonwealth Games where he won the silver medal in the 81–91 kg (heavyweight) division, losing on points to Ugandan George Oywello.

Four years later, Kini fought Ghanaian boxer Adonis Ray in the Heavyweight final to win gold at the 1966 Kingston Commonwealth Games.

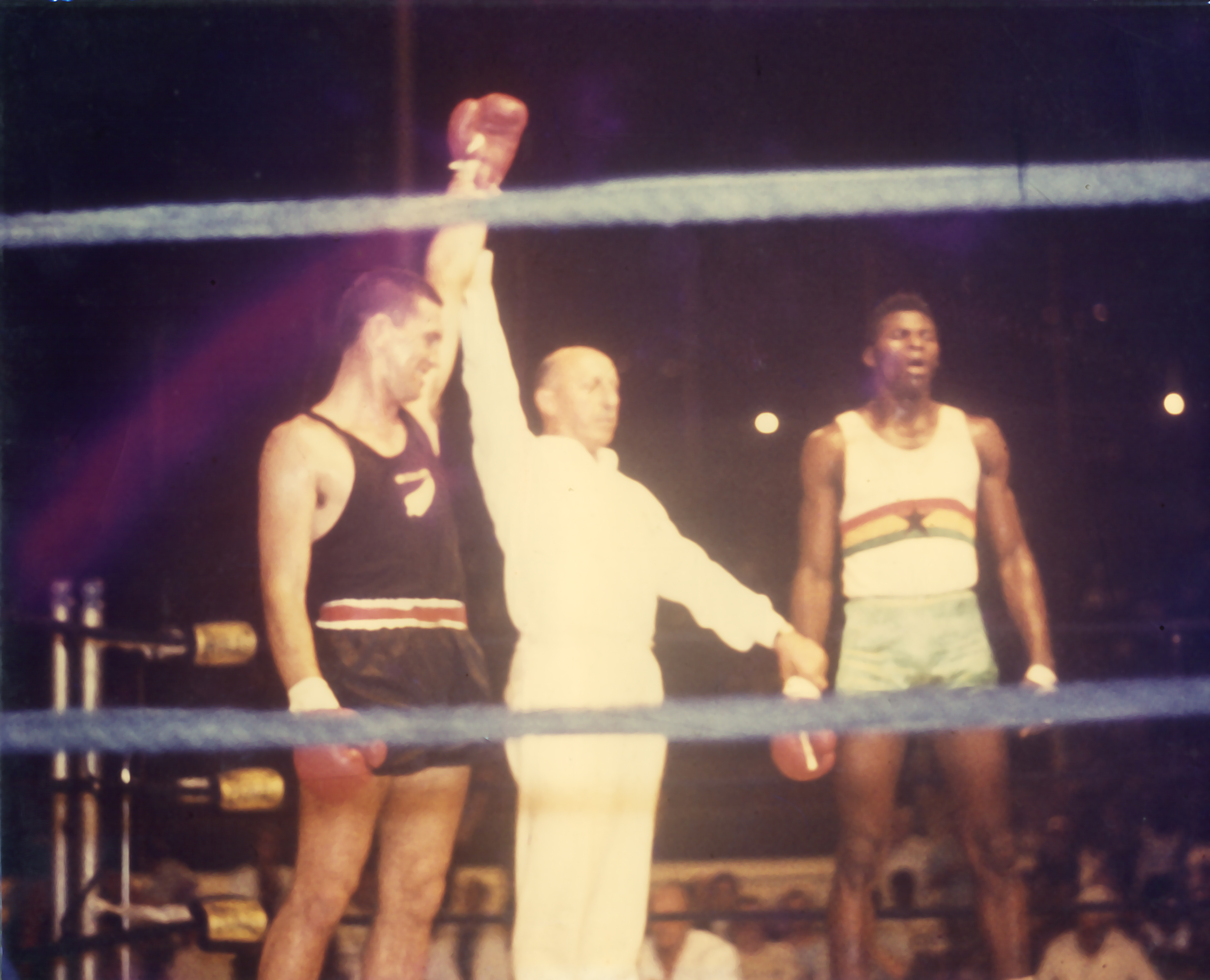
Bill Kini defeats Ghanaian boxer Adonis Ray in the heavyweight gold medal bout 1966 British Empire and Commonwealth Games, Kingston, Jamaica.

In the early 1960s, Kini was a member of the successful Ōtāhuhu rugby team in the Auckland club competition, winning the Gallaher Shield four times. He played in the prop position. During this period he also captained the Auckland Māori rugby team.

Kini and his family moved to Whangārei in 1980. He was the strapper and masseur for the Northland rugby team for 11 years until 2003.

2004 saw him become one of the inaugural inductees into the New Zealand Māori Sports Hall of Fame. He was awarded this legendary status alongside fellow Northlander Sid Going, and other Māori legends Pat Walsh, Mack Herewini, Waka Nathan, Manga Emery and the late George Nepia.

Kini died in Whangārei in 2012, as a result of complications from a cancerous tumour on his spine. He is survived by his wife Janice, children Brad, Jason, Ferne and André, his children-in-law and seven grandchildren.
