= Aaron Popoola =

Ghanaian boxer

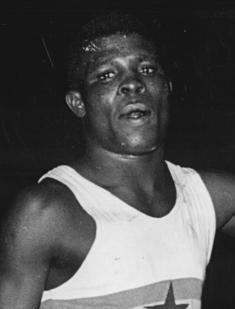
- Popoola in 1962

Personal information
- Born: 22 March 1942 (age 84) Accra, Ghana
- Height: 1.68 m (5 ft 6 in)
- Weight: 67 kg (148 lb)

Sport
- Sport: Boxing
Medal record
Representing Ghana
Commonwealth Games
Silver medal – second place	1966 Kingston	Light Welterweight

Aaron Popoola (born 22 March 1942) is a former Ghanaian boxer. He participated in the 1968 Olympics, where he lost in the second round to Turkish Celal Sandal. He participated in the 1962 British Empire and Commonwealth Games and 1966 Commonwealth Games, winning the silver medal in 1966 after losing to Jim McCourt.

== 1968 Olympic results ==
Below is the record of Aaron Popoola, a Ghanaian welterweight boxer who competed at the 1968 Mexico City Olympics:

- Round of 64: bye
- Round of 32: lost to Celal Sandal (Turkey) by decision, 2-3
