= Paddy Maguire (boxer) =

Irish boxer

Personal information
- Nationality: British (Northern Irish)
- Born: 26 September 1948 (age 77) Belfast, Northern Ireland
- Weight: Featherweight / Bantamweight

Boxing career
- Sport: Boxing
- Club: South Belfast ABC
- Stance: Orthodox

Boxing record
- Total fights: 35
- Wins: 26
- Win by KO: 16
- Losses: 8
- Draws: 1
- No contests: 0
Medal record
Men's boxing
Representing Northern Ireland
Commonwealth Games
Silver medal – second place	1966 Kingston	Featherweight

Patrick Maguire (born 26 September 1948) is a former boxer from the Falls Road area of Belfast, Northern Ireland. He was a Commonwealth Games silver medal winner and holder of the BBBC bantamweight title.

== Amateur career ==
Maguire, who was born in the Kashmir Road area of Clonard, West Belfast, represented the 1966 Northern Irish Team at the 1966 British Empire and Commonwealth Games in Kingston, Jamaica, participating in the 57kg featherweight category, and won a silver medal.

== Professional career ==
Maguire's first professional fight was on 4 March 1969 when he beat Bernard Nicholls on points. He fought on the undercard of Muhammad Ali's bout with Al "Blue" Lewis at Croke Park, Dublin, on 19 July 1972, defeating Guy Caudron of France on points.

His first title fight was on 20 February 1973, at the Royal Albert Hall, for the British bantamweight title. He lost on points to Johnny Clark.

Maguire's second attempt to lift the bantamweight title came on 10 December 1974, at Nottingham ice rink. His opponent was Dave Needham, Maguire again losing on points. On 20 October 1975 Maguire's third attempt to win the British bantamweight title was successful. This time he beat Needham, winning by a technical knockout in the 14th round.

Maguire had two unsuccessful attempts to win the European Boxing Union (EBU) bantamweight title. The first took place at Cluses, France, on 16 January 1976, when he drew with Daniel Trioulaire. At Cagliari, Sardinia, on 28 September 1977, Maguire lost by TKO in the 8th round to Franco Zurlo.

Maguire lost his British bantamweight title on 29 November 1977, at the National Sporting Club, Piccadilly, to relative newcomer Johnny Owen. After a TKO in the 11th round Maguire never fought again.

== Retirement ==
Maguire retired from professional boxing in 1977 aged 29. He is still involved in the sport and is currently serving as a Council Member on the Northern Ireland Area Council of the British Boxing Board of Control

Conservative politician Colin Moynihan is recorded in Hansard as having once sparred with the retired Maguire at the Thomas A Becket public house on London's Old Kent Road.

== See also ==
- List of British bantamweight boxing champions
