= Tommy Dwyer (boxer) =

Welsh boxer

Personal information
- Nationality: British (Welsh)
- Born: Wales

Sport
- Sport: Boxing
- Event: Featherweight
- Club: Roath Youth ABC

Thomas H. Dwyer is a former boxer from Wales, who competed at the 1966 British Empire and Commonwealth Games (now Commonwealth Games).

== Biography ==
Dwyer boxed for Roath Youth Amateur Boxing Club. and in 1965 was boxing at featherweight.

In May 1966 he represented Wales against France in an International match and also won the 1966 Welsh Senior ABA Championships.

He represented the 1966 Welsh team at the 1966 British Empire and Commonwealth Games in Kingston, Jamaica, participating in the featherweight category;

He continued to represent Wales after the Games.
