= Bobby Mallon (boxer) =

Scottish boxer

Personal information
- Nationality: British (Scottish)
- Born: 1942 Barrowfield, Glasgow, Scotland
- Died: 2019 (aged 76–77)

Sport
- Sport: Boxing
- Event: Flyweight
- Club: Dennistoun Youth Club; Kelvin A.B.C; Rolls Royce ABC
Medal record
Representing Scotland
Commonwealth Games
| Gold medal – first place | 1962 Perth | flyweight |

Robert Mallon (1942 – 2019) was a boxer who competed for Scotland and won a gold medal at the Commonwealth Games.

== Biography ==
Mallon was visually impaired and boxed out of Dennistoun Youth Club. He won the 1962 Scottish flyweight title.

Mallon also won Scottish titles at bantamweight, featherweight and lightweight and was a Scottish international.

He was selected for the 1962 Scottish team for the 1962 British Empire and Commonwealth Games in Perth, Australia. He competed in the flweight category, where he won the gold medal, defeating Isaac Aryee of Ghana in the final.

He also won the prestigious ABA championships title in 1965, boxing out of Rolls Royce BC.

Mallon represented the Scottish Empire and Commonwealth Games team again at the 1966 British Empire and Commonwealth Games in Kingston, Jamaica, participating in the 54kg bantamweight category.
