= John Olulu =

Kenyan boxer (1944–1972)

Personal information
- Nationality: Kenyan
- Born: 20 May 1944; Kitui, Kenya
- Died: 17 March 1972 (aged 27)

Sport
- Sport: Boxing

John Olulu (20 May 1944 – 17 March 1972) was a Kenyan boxer. He competed at the 1964 Summer Olympics and the 1968 Summer Olympics. At the 1968 Summer Olympics, he lost to Arto Nilsson of Finland.
