= Sulley Shittu =

Ghanaian boxer (born 1946)

Personal information
- Nationality: Ghanaian
- Born: 15 April 1946 (age 80) Koforidua, Ghana
- Height: 5 ft 6 in (1.68 m)
- Weight: fly/bantamweight

Boxing career
- Stance: Orthodox

Boxing record
- Total fights: 35
- Wins: 34 (KO 20)
- Losses: 1 (KO 1)

Sulley Shittu (born 15 April 1946 in Koforidua) is a Ghanaian amateur fly/bantamweight, and professional bantamweight boxer of the 1960s and 1970s who as an amateur represented Ghana at flyweight in the Boxing at the 1964 Summer Olympics in Tokyo, Japan, losing to John McCafferty of the Republic of Ireland, won silver at the 1965 All-Africa Games in Brazzaville, won a gold medal at flyweight in the Boxing at the 1966 British Empire and Commonwealth Games in Kingston, Jamaica, represented Ghana at bantamweight in the Boxing at the 1968 Summer Olympics in Mexico City, losing to Horst Rascher of West Germany, and won a gold medal at bantamweight in the Boxing at the 1970 British Commonwealth Games in Edinburgh, Scotland and as a professional won the African Boxing Union (ABU) bantamweight title, and Commonwealth bantamweight title.

== 1964 Olympic results ==
Below is the record of Sulley Shittu, a Ghanaian flyweight boxer who competed at the 1964 Tokyo Olympics:

- Round of 32: defeated Jumaat Ibrahim (Malaysia) by knockout
- Round of 16: lost to Sean McCafferty (Ireland) by decision, 2-3
