= Tom Imrie =

Scottish boxer

Personal information
- Nationality: British (Scottish)
- Born: 7 June 1947 Edinburgh, Scotland
- Died: 16 May 2015 (aged 67) Dunfermline, Scotland

Sport
- Sport: Boxing
- Event: Light-middleweight
- Club: Buccleuch ABC
Medal record
Men's boxing
Representing Scotland
Commonwealth Games
Silver medal – second place	1966 Kingston	light-middleweight
Gold medal – first place	1970 Edinburgh	light-middleweight

Tom Imrie (7 June 1947 – 16 May 2015) was a boxer from Scotland who won gold and silver medals at the Commonwealth Games.

== Biography ==
Imrie boxed out of the Buccleuch Amateur Boxing Club and was the 1965 Scottish welterweight champion at the age of 17.

Imrie represented the Scottish Empire and Commonwealth Games team at the 1966 British Empire and Commonwealth Games in Kingston, Jamaica, participating in the light-middleweight category. He won the silver medal.

Four years later he won the gold medal at the 1970 British Commonwealth Games in Edinburgh.

He was twice winner of the prestigious ABA light-middleweight title at Wembley in 1966 and 1969.

He died in 2015 in Dunfermline, aged 67.
