= Darryl Norwood =

Australian boxer

Personal information
- Nationality: Australian
- Born: 4 December 1944 (age 81)

Sport
- Sport: Boxing
Medal record
British Empire Games
Silver medal – second place	1966 Kingston	Men's Bantamweight

Darryl Norwood (born 4 December 1944) is an Australian boxer. He competed in the men's flyweight event at the 1964 Summer Olympics. At the 1964 Summer Olympics, he defeated Luis Romo of Argentina, before losing to Fernando Atzori of Italy.
