= Matthias Ouma =

Ugandan boxer (born 1945)

Personal information
- Nationality: Ugandan
- Born: 3 December 1945 (age 79); Kampala, Uganda

Sport
- Sport: Boxing

George Matthias Ouma (born 3 December 1945) is a Ugandan boxer. He competed at the 1968 Summer Olympics and the 1972 Summer Olympics. At the 1972 Summer Olympics, he lost to Imre Tóth in his first fight.
