= Kenneth Campbell (boxer) =

Jamaican boxer (born 1949)

Personal information
- Born: 19 August 1949 (age 76) Clarendon, Colony of Jamaica, British Empire

Sport
- Sport: Boxing
Medal record
Men's amateur boxing
Representing Jamaica
British Empire and Commonwealth Games
Silver medal – second place	1966 Kingston	Flyweight

Kenneth Campbell (born 19 August 1949) is a Jamaican boxer. He competed in the men's bantamweight event at the 1968 Summer Olympics.
