= Jim McCourt =

Irish boxer (1944–2023)

Personal information
- Nationality: British (Northern Irish)
- Born: 24 January 1944 Belfast, Northern Ireland
- Died: 19 June 2023 (aged 79)
- Height: 170 cm (5 ft 7 in)
- Weight: 64 kg (141 lb)

Sport
- Sport: Boxing
- Event: Light-welterweight
- Club: Immaculata ABC, Belfast
Medal record
Men’s boxing
Representing Ireland
Olympic Games
Bronze medal – third place	1964 Tokyo	Lightweight
European Championships
Bronze medal – third place	1965 East Berlin	Lightweight
Representing Northern Ireland
Commonwealth Games
Gold medal – first place	1966 Kingston	Light Welterweight

James Vincent McCourt (24 January 1944 – 19 June 2023) was an Irish boxer from Belfast, Northern Ireland.

== Biography ==
McCourt won a bronze medal for Ireland in the 1964 Summer Olympics in Tokyo in the lightweight division. He lost a hotly disputed 3–2 decision to Russian Velikton Barannikov in the semi-final. Shortly after the games, McCourt defeated Olympic champion Józef Grudzień of Poland. A year later, he repeated his bronze medal performance at the 1965 European Amateur Boxing Championships in Berlin in the same grade.

McCourt represented the 1966 Northern Irish Team at the 1966 British Empire and Commonwealth Games in Kingston, Jamaica, participating in the 63.5kg light-welterweight category and won the gold medal.

McCourt was rated the number one amateur boxer in the world for four years. A master of defence and counter punching, he was inducted in the Irish Amateur Boxing Hall of Fame.
