= Eddie Ndukwu =

Nigerian boxer (born 1950)

Personal information
- Nationality: Nigerian
- Born: Edward Ndukwu; 1 June 1950 (age 76) Lagos, Nigeria
- Weight: bantam/super bantam/featherweight

Boxing career

Boxing record
- Total fights: 16
- Wins: 14 (KO 10)
- Losses: 2 (KO 2)

Eddie Ndukwu (born 1 June 1950) is a Nigerian amateur and professional bantam/super bantam/featherweight boxer of the 1960s, '70s and '80s who as an amateur won the gold medal at bantamweight in the Boxing at the 1966 British Empire and Commonwealth Games in Kingston, Jamaica, won the silver medal at featherweight at the 1973 All-Africa Games, won the featherweight class at the 1974 British Commonwealth Games, and represented Nigeria in the 1974 World Amateur Boxing Championships losing to eventual gold medal winner Howard Davis, Jr. of the United States. As a professional, he won the Nigerian Featherweight title, and Commonwealth featherweight title, his professional fighting weight varied from 118 lb (54 kg; 8 st 6 lb), i.e. bantamweight to 124 3/4 lb (56.6 kg; 8 st 12.8 lb), i.e. featherweight.

As a professional, Ndukwu was undefeated until he fought Wilfredo Gomez at the Puerto Rican's hometown of San Juan. The World Boxing Council wanted to design this a world featherweight championship eliminator fight but they were dissuaded once Gomez was not able to make the Featherweight division's limit, so the fight was fought without their sanctioning. On Sunday, April 4, 1980, Ndukwu lost to the International Boxing Hall of Fame member by a fourth-round technical knockout at San Juan's Hiram Bithorn Stadium.
