= Joe Darkey =

Ghanaian boxer

Medal record

Men's Boxing

Representing Ghana

British Empire and Commonwealth Games
Gold medal – first place	1966 Kingston	Middleweight

Joe Darkey (born 22 May 1942) is a former Ghanaian professional boxer who competed in the 1960s. A middleweight he competed in Boxing at the 1964 Summer Olympics - Middleweight, but was defeated in the third round. However two years later in 1966 he participated in the 1966 British Empire and Commonwealth Games and won a gold medal.

== 1964 Olympic results ==
Below is the Olympic record of Joe Darkey, a Ghanaian middleweight boxer who competed at the 1964 Tokyo Olympics:

- Round of 32: bye
- Round of 16: defeated James Rosette (United States) by decision, 3-2
- Quarterfinal: lost to Valery Popenchenko (Soviet union) by decision, 0-5
