= John Turpin (boxer) =

Former boxer who competed for England

Personal information
- Nationality: British (English)
- Born: c. 1945

Sport
- Sport: Boxing
- Event: Middleweight
- Club: Rothwell Collliery ABC, Leeds
Medal record
Boxing
Representing England
British Empire & Commonwealth Games
Bronze medal – third place	1966 Kingston	75 kg middleweight

John Turpin (born c. 1945) is a male former boxer who competed for England.

== Biography ==
Turpin was a miner by profession and fouth out of the Rothwell Collliery Amateur Boxing Club in Leeds.

He represented the England team and won a bronze medal in the 75 kg middleweight, at the 1966 British Empire and Commonwealth Games in Kingston, Jamaica.

He was a member of the Rothwell Colliery ABC and was 1966 Light Welterweight ABA champion runner-up.

Turpin was the nephew of Randolph Turpin.
