= Alex Odhiambo =

Ugandan boxer

Personal information
- Nationality: Ugandan
- Born: 10 October 1943 (age 81); Jinja, Uganda

Sport
- Sport: Boxing

Alex Odhiambo (born 10 October 1943) is a Ugandan boxer. He competed at the 1964 Summer Olympics and the 1968 Summer Olympics.
