= John Rakowski =

Australian boxer

Personal information
- Nationality: Australian
- Born: 16 March 1948 (age 78) Brisbane, Australia

Sport
- Sport: Boxing
Medal record
British Empire Games
Bronze medal – third place	1966 Kingston	Men's Flyweight

John Rakowski (born 16 March 1948) is an Australian boxer. He competed in the men's bantamweight event at the 1968 Summer Olympics.
