= Adonis Ray =

Ghanaian boxer

Personal information
- Nationality: Ghanaian
- Born: 4 August 1944 (age 80); Takoradi, Ghana

Sport
- Sport: Boxing

Adonis Ray (born 4 August 1944) is a Ghanaian boxer. He competed in the men's heavyweight event at the 1968 Summer Olympics. At the 1968 Summer Olympics, he lost to Joaquin Rocha of Mexico.
