= Fatai Ayinla =

Nigerian boxer (1939–2016)

Medal record
Representing Nigeria
Men's Boxing
World Amateur Championships
Bronze medal – third place	1974 Havana	Heavyweight
All-Africa Games
Gold medal – first place	1973 Lagos	Heavyweight
Commonwealth Games
Silver medal – second place	1966 Kingston	Light Heavyweight
Gold medal – first place	1970 Edinburgh	Light Heavyweight
Silver medal – second place	1974 Christchurch	Heavyweight

Fatai Ayinla-Adekunle (6 May 1939 – 12 October 2016) was an amateur boxer from Nigeria, who won the gold medal in the men's heavyweight division (+ 81 kg) at the 1973 All-Africa Games in Lagos, Nigeria. He was born in Ibadan, Oyo. Ayinla represented his native country twice at the Summer Olympics: in 1968 and 1972. He claimed a bronze medal at the first World Amateur Boxing Championships in Havana, Cuba (1974).

== 1972 Olympic results ==
Below is the record of Fatai Ayinla, a Nigerian heavyweight boxer who competed at the 1972 Munich Olympics:

- Round of 16: lost to Carroll Morgan (Canada) by decision, 2-3
