= Brian Kendall (boxer) =

New Zealand boxer (1947–1998)

Medal record

Representing New Zealand

Men's Boxing

British Empire Games
Bronze medal – third place	1966 Kingston	Bantamweight

Brian Kendall (20 March 1947 – 1 May 1998) was a New Zealand boxer.

== Biography ==
Born in Christchurch, New Zealand, in 1947, Kendall began boxing as a nine-year-old at the Linwood Boys' Club.

He won the bronze medal in the men's 51–54 kg (bantamweight) division at the 1966 British Empire and Commonwealth Games, and competed in the 54–57 kg (featherweight) division at the 1970 British Commonwealth Games.

Kendall won seven consecutive national boxing titles in four different weight divisions from 1963 to 1969. He won the Jameson Belt for most scientific boxer at the 1965 and 1966 national championships. His career record was 97 wins from 108 bouts.

Kendall died from cancer in Brisbane, Australia, in 1998.
