= Nojim Maiyegun =

Nigerian boxer (1941–2024)

Medal record

Representing Nigeria

Men's Boxing

Olympic Games
| Bronze medal – third place | 1964 Tokyo | Light Middleweight |

Commonwealth Games
| Bronze medal – third place | 1966 Kingston | Light Middleweight |

Nojim Maiyegun (17 February 1941 – 26 August 2024) was a Nigerian boxer, who won the bronze medal in the men's Light Middleweight (71 kg) category at the 1964 Summer Olympics in Tokyo, Japan.

Maiyegun was born in Lagos on 17 February 1941. He was Nigeria's first Olympic medalist. Maiyegun revealed his loss of vision in 2012.

Maiyegun died on 26 August 2024, at the age of 83.
