= Frank Albert Scott =

Canadian boxer (1949–2005)

Medal record
Men's amateur boxing
Representing Canada
British Empire and Commonwealth Games
| Bronze medal – third place | 1966 Kingston | Flyweight |

Frank Albert Scott (1949–2005) was a boxer and boxing coach.

== Career ==
Scott won a bronze medal at the 1966 Commonwealth Games. He was a member of the Canadian boxing team in the 1966 and 1970 Commonwealth Games and the 1967 Pan American Games. During his active years, some of his bouts took place in Seattle, Washington, including an "All Star" boxing card that took place on March 23, 1968. Scott also competed in the 1968 Seattle Golden Gloves/Pacific Northwest AAU Championships as part of one of the largest British Columbian teams ever to compete.

Prior to the 1968 Seattle Golden Gloves, Scott competed in the 1968 BC Golden Gloves, held at Vancouver's PNE Garden Auditorium. He made it to the finals with a victory over Steven Flajole of Renton, Washington to face teammate Brian Zelley, who defeated Brian Gray of the East Vancouver Optimists Boxing Club. In the finals, Scott earned a victory by decision.

Scott was a boxing coach with the Queensborough Boxing Club in New Westminster, British Columbia, Canada.

== British Columbia Amateur Boxing Hall of Fame ==
In 2010, Scott was one of fifteen selected for enshrinement into the newly created British Columbia Amateur Boxing Hall of Fame.
