= List of British super-featherweight boxing champions =

List of British super-featherweight boxing champions is a table showing the boxers who have won the British super-featherweight title. A junior-lightweight title was sanctioned by the British Boxing Board of Control (BBBoC) from 1968 to 1969. A title at the weight was reintroduced in 1986, now renamed the super-featherweight title.

A champion may retire or voluntarily relinquish the title in order to fight for a higher-ranked championship. Where the date on which a champion relinquished the title is unclear, the date of the last BBBoC sanctioned fight is shown.

^{r}–Champion relinquished title.

^{s}–Champion stripped of title.

Name	Duration of reign	Defences
Jimmy Anderson	20 February 1968 – 25 February 1969^{r}	2
John Doherty	16 January 1986 – 17 April 1986	1
Pat Cowdell	17 April 1986 – 24 May 1986	1
Najib Daho	24 May 1986 – 26 October 1987	1
Pat Cowdell	26 October 1987 – 18 May 1988	1
Floyd Havard	18 May 1988 – 6 September 1989	1
John Doherty	6 September 1989 – 6 February 1990	1
Joey Jacobs	6 February 1990 – 18 September 1990	1
Hugh Forde	18 September 1990 – 24 October 1990	1
Kevin Pritchard	24 October 1990 – 5 March 1991	1
Robert Dickie	5 March 1991 – 30 April 1991	1
Sugar Gibiliru	30 April 1991 – 19 September 1991	1
John Doherty	19 September 1991 – 25 April 1992	1
Michael Armstrong	25 April 1992 – 13 October 1992	1
Neil Haddock	13 October 1992 – 23 March 1994	2
Floyd Havard	23 March 1994 – 5 May 1995^{r}	2
PJ Gallagher	22 April 1996 – 29 June 1996^{r}	1
Charles Shepherd	22 September 1997 – 2 May 1998^{r}	2
Michael Gomez	4 September 1999 – 27 October 2001^{r}	4
Alex Arthur	19 October 2002 – 25 October 2003	3
Michael Gomez	25 October 2003^{r}	0
Alex Arthur	8 April 2005 – 18 February 2006	1
Carl Johanneson	12 July 2006 – 8 March 2008	4
Kevin Mitchell	8 March 2008^{r}	0
Gary Sykes	5 March 2010 – 24 September 2011	3
Gary Buckland	24 September 2011 – 17 August 2013	4
Stephen Smith	17 August 2013^{r}	0
Gary Sykes	24 May 2014 – 29 November 2014	1
Liam Walsh	29 November 2014 – 30 April 2016^{r}	2
Martin J Ward	10 September 2016 – 15 July 2017^{r}	3
Sam Bowen	14 April 2018 – 30 November 2019	1
Anthony Cacace	30 November 2019 – ?^{r}	1
Liam Dillon	15 July 2023 – 10 February 2024	0
Reece Bellotti	10 February 2024 – 26 July 2025	2
Ryan Garner	26 July 2025 – January 2026^{r}	0
Royston Barney-Smith	17 April 2026 – present	0

== See also ==
- List of British heavyweight boxing champions
- List of British cruiserweight boxing champions
- List of British light-heavyweight boxing champions
- List of British super-middleweight boxing champions
- List of British middleweight boxing champions
- List of British light-middleweight boxing champions
- List of British welterweight boxing champions
- List of British light-welterweight boxing champions
- List of British lightweight boxing champions
- List of British featherweight boxing champions
- List of British super-bantamweight boxing champions
- List of British bantamweight boxing champions
- List of British super-flyweight boxing champions
- List of British flyweight boxing champions
- List of British world boxing champions

== Sources ==
- boxrec
