= Boxing in Wales =

Boxing is a popular sport in Wales, and since the early 20th century Wales has produced a notable number of professional boxers including several World Champions. The most notable boxers include Wales' first World Champion Percy Jones; Jimmy Wilde, who is seen as pound-for-pound one of the World's finest boxers and Joe Calzaghe, who ended his career an undefeated World Champion.

== The early history of boxing in Wales ==
Despite the sport of boxing in Wales being heavily identified with the industrial south, it was a common pastime in pre-industrial Wales around the country; and was patronized by the local gentry. In the late 18th century, boxing became more commercialised with promoters and publicans organising paid matches that attracted spectators, and with them heavy betting. In 1797 the skilful 'Whitechapel Jew', Daniel Mendoza fought in a match near Neath and 1819 saw exhibition bouts staged by two of England's greatest bare-knuckle boxers, Tom Cribb and Tom Spring. One of the more common ways for the Welsh public to watch a fight was at race meets. Boxing had always been associated with horse racing, and according to the Racing Calendar the favoured Welsh courses were Brecon, Carmarthen, Knighton, Wrexham and Monmouth. In 1824 the 4,000 racing pundits at Monmouth were also entertained with a fight in which a quarryman called Parry beat Powell in a 103-round contest. The early 19th century also witnessed the emergence of Welsh boxers whose fame extended beyond the confines of the boxing rings. One of the first Welsh fighters of note, despite being born in Southwark in London, was Ned Turner. Turner's parents were both from Montgomeryshire and he was dubbed the "pugilistic prince of Wales' by the North Wales Gazette in 1823.

...a crowd of men, young and old, assembled to take part in that brutalising practice - a prizefight! The scene was in a hollow on Cilsanws hill behind the Cefn. ...for a long period these individuals for we can scarcely call them men, with the ferocity of beasts, fought each other in endeavoring to win a paltry wager of a few shillings, until all recognition by their features was impossible.

— Extract from the Merthyr Telegraph 25 September 1858

The opening of the South Wales Valleys to industrialisation in the mid-1800s saw a large influx of commercial immigration. This was followed by an improved transport network, which in turn allowed larger crowds, and larger wagers, to be brought to the sport of boxing. When the Taff Vale Railway was extended to Merthyr Tydfil in 1840, the locals celebrated by a contest between Cyfarthfa champion John Nash, and Merthyr hardman Shoni Sguborfawr. The adoption of boxing as a sport for the underprivileged in industrial Wales is compared, by Welsh historian Gareth Williams, to the living conditions of the emerging towns themselves. Towns like Merthyr, one of the heartlands of the world's iron industry, with its dire health and living conditions, along with a high rate of industrial injury and death, reinforced in the minds of the working class that life was short and brutal. The sport of boxing, though exploitative of the common man, was still a means to rise above the poverty of everyday life and glamourized the primitive.

In 1867, Wales made its first major contribution to boxing, when Llanelli-born sportsman and sport organiser John Graham Chambers devised and drafted the Queensbury Rules, the basic code to which boxing still practices under to this day. Although boxing now had its legitimate code of laws, Wales would often be the location of illegal bare-knuckled fights, and there would be known mountainside locations where locals would meet to watch fights. These illegal fights were often conducted at dawn in isolated or remote areas, though they were still sometimes disrupted by the law. To evade criminal proceedings, fights were often arranged on land near county borders where jurisdiction was vague and law enforcement intermittent. In particular the area between Tafarnaubach near Tredegar and Llangynidr in Powys became the 'nursery for would-be champions' due to its proximity to the borders of three counties. Towards the end of the Victorian period several Welsh boxers, who made their name as mountain fighters, began fighting under Queensbury rules and became well known and respected sportsmen. Among their number were champion fighters, John O'Brien, Dai St. John, Redmond Coleman and butcher brothers Sam and Ivor Thomas. By the early 20th century, boxing had not advanced to a great degree in Wales, and many of the country's early professional boxers began their career fighting in booths at fairgrounds. With the popularity of the sport increasing, a scale of weights and titles evolved, which allowed the emergence of working-class local heroes.

== 20th century boxing in Wales ==
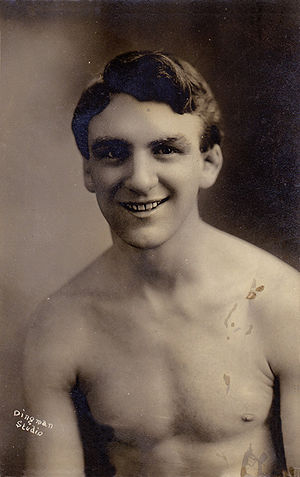
World Lightweight Champion, Freddie Welsh

In the first third of the 20th century the South Wales valleys produced a prolific stream of boxing champions. The valleys area around Pontypridd produced more champions during this period than any region of a comparable size in the world. The champions included three boxers from the Rhondda; Tom Thomas of Penygraig, Percy Jones of Porth and Jimmy Wilde from Tylorstown, and Pontypridd's own Freddie Welsh and Frank Moody. All these boxers fought with a particular 'Welsh' stance, upright, and using a combination of fast two-fisted attacks. Of these fighters, Jimmy Wilde stands out as a true great of World boxing, whose diminutive stature and light frame hid an incredible punching power, that was reflected in one of his nicknames, 'The Ghost with the Hammer in his Hand'. Wilde fought over 150 professional bouts, losing just five, and achieved 99 knockouts. Although the coalfields and ironworks of South Wales produced notable fighters, other areas of South Wales also produced memorable fighters. The darling of Cardiff was 'Peerless' Jim Driscoll, who took the featherweight Lonsdale belt in 1910. Other boxers who were able to translate success in Britain abroad, included Gipsy Daniels who fought at Madison Square Garden and Bill Beynon who took the Empire Bantamweight title.

In April 1928 the Welsh Boxing Association and Control Board was set up to regulate championships and ensure the safety of the boxers in Wales. It initially attempted to remain independent of the British Boxing Board of Control (BBBC), with whom it had had some disputes, but by 1929 it had amalgamated with the newly reconstituted BBBC, and after that Welsh boxing was managed by the Welsh Area Council. The Welsh Board set about forming a championship for each weight division, and by 1929 all eight weights had a recognised Welsh champion. With the championship formed, the titles could now only be won in a Board of Control designated contest. Although Wales was now recognised within the BBBC as one of the eight areas of their control, the Welsh champions were regarded as representing their country rather than just an administrative area.

Despite the popularity of team sports in Wales such as rugby union and football, boxing as a solo sport was integral to regional culture in Wales and extremely popular with the working classes. Even when Welsh economic fortunes slumped during the depression in the 1930s, boxing retained popular support, though the number of world championship titles faded. Two Welsh boxers of note emerged during this period, Jack Petersen, who won the British Heavyweight Championship on two occasions and the 'Tonypandy Terror', Tommy Farr, who took the Empire heavyweight crown. Although Farr never achieved the success of previous Welsh boxers, his struggle as a professional fighter, especially his 1937 15 round defeat to Joe Louis, was seen to mirror the struggle of the Welsh workers.

Post World War II, Wales produced another round of championship contenders, though as with the previous decade they failed to emulate the Welsh boxers of the 1920s. Ronnie James of Pontardawe, Dai Dower of Abercynon and Colin Jones of Gorseinon all held British titles but did not win a world title belt. The later half of the 20th century saw a string of Welsh boxers who engaged the Welsh psyche, with a centred group of fighters coming from the Merthyr area. These Merthyr boxers included welterweight Eddie Thomas, featherweight Howard Winstone and bantamweight Johnny Owen, who lost his life in a fight against Lupe Pintor in 1980.

Welsh boxing in the twentieth century produced a number of notable light and middle weight boxers, but failed to have a similar impact on the heavyweight categories, which was not reflective of the rest of the United Kingdom. The notable exceptions to this were the Dick Richardson of Newport and Joe Erskine from Cardiff, who, along with England's Henry Cooper and Brian London formed a quartet of promising British heavyweights during the late 1950s and early 1960s.

The final decade of the twentieth century saw four Welshmen take World Championship titles. Steve Robinson became the WBO Featherweight Champion in 1993, followed by Robbie Regan (WBO World Bantamweight) in 1996, Barry Jones (WBO World Super-Featherweight) and Joe Calzaghe (WBO Super Middleweight), both in 1997.

== 21st century boxing in Wales ==
The first decade of the 21st century of boxing in Wales was dominated by a single fighter, Joe Calzaghe. Although Calzaghe came to note after beating former Middleweight World Champion Chris Eubank on points in 1997 to win the WBO title, it was during the 2000s that he came to prominence. Calzaghe finished his career with 46 bouts and no losses, one of the few World Champions to retire undefeated.

Other boxers of note to emerge during the early 21st century include, Jason Cook who became European Lightweight Champion in 2002, Nathan Cleverly the European, British, Commonwealth and WBO World light heavyweight title holder, Gavin Rees former WBA light-welterweight champion and Enzo Maccarinelli former WBO and WBU cruiserweight champion.

== Welsh boxing champions ==
=== British boxing champions from Wales ===
Name	Weight	From	Duration of reign	Successful defences
Jim Driscoll	Featherweight	Cardiff	May 1906 - Dec 1919	5
Tom Thomas	Middleweight	Penygraig	Oct 1909 - Nov 1910	1
Freddie Welsh	Lightweight	Pontypridd	Nov 1909 - Feb 1911; Nov 1912 -> Dec 1912	0; 1
Bill Beynon	Bantamweight	Taibach	Jun 1913 - Oct 1913	0
Percy Jones	Flyweight	Porth	Jan 1914 - Mar 1914	0
Johnny Basham	Welterweight	Newport	Dec 1914 - Jun 1920	3
Jimmy Wilde	Flyweight	Merthyr Tydfil	Feb 1916 - Feb 1921	1
Johnny Basham	Middleweight	Newport	May 1921 - Oct 1921	0
Gipsy Daniels	Light-heavyweight	Llanelli	Apr 1927 - Feb 1921	0
Frank Moody	Light-heavyweight	Pontypridd	Nov 1927	0
Frank Moody	Middleweight	Pontypridd	Aug 1928 - Sep 1928	0
Jack Petersen	Light-heavyweight	Cardiff	May 1932 - (vacated)	0
Jack Petersen	Heavyweight	Cardiff	Jul 1932 - Nov 1933; Jun 1934 - Aug 1936	2; 3
Tommy Farr	Heavyweight	Tonypandy	Mar 1937 - (vacated)	0
Ronnie James	Lightweight	Swansea	Aug 1944 -	0
Eddie Thomas	Welterweight	Merthyr Tydfil	Nov 1949 - Oct 1951	1
Johnny Williams	Heavyweight	Barmouth	Mar 1952 - May 1953	1
Cliff Curvis	Welterweight	Swansea	Jul 1952 - Dec 1952	0
Dennis Powell	Light-heavyweight	Four Crosses, Powys	Mar 1953 - Oct 1953	0
Dai Dower	Flyweight	Abercynon	Feb 1955 - > Dec 1955	1
Joe Erskine	Heavyweight	Cardiff	Aug 1956 - Jun 1958	2
Brian Curvis	Welterweight	Swansea	Nov 1960 - Feb 1962; Feb 1963 - Sep 1966	2; 2
Howard Winstone	Featherweight	Merthyr Tydfil	May 1961 - Jul 1968	6
Eddie Avoth	Light-heavyweight	Cardiff	Jan 1969 - Jan 1971	1
Pat Thomas	Bantamweight	Cardiff	Dec 1975 - Dec 1976	1
Pat Thomas	Light-Middleweight	Cardiff	Sep 1979 - Mar 1981	2
Johnny Owen	Bantamweight	Merthyr Tydfil	Nov 1977 - 1980	3
Colin Jones	Welterweight	Swansea	Apr 1980 - Apr 1981	1
Neville Meade	Heavyweight	Swansea	Nov 1981 - Sep 1983	0
Kelvin Smart	Flyweight	Caerphilly	Sep 1982 - Jan 1984	0
Steve Sims	Featherweight	Newport	Sep 1982 - Jul 1986	0
David Pearce	Heavyweight	Newport	Sep 1983 - 1984	0
Robert Dickie	Featherweight	Cefneithin	Apr 1986 - Oct 1986	2
Peter Harris	Featherweight	Cefneithin	Feb 1988 - Apr 1988	0
Floyd Havard	Super-featherweight	Swansea	May 1988 - Sep 1989; Mar 1994 - 1996	0; 1
Robert Dickie	Super-featherweight	Cefneithin	Mar 1991 - Apr 1991	0
Robbie Regan	Flyweight	Bargoed	Dec 1991 - > 1996	0
Neil Haddock	Super-featherweight	Llanelli	Oct 1992 - Mar 1994	1
Joe Calzaghe	Super-middleweight	Newbridge	Oct 1995 - Nov 2007	1
Scott Gammer	Heavyweight	Pembroke Dock	Jun 2006 -> Mar 2007	1
Nathan Cleverly	Light-heavyweight	Cefn Fforest	Jul 2009 -> 2011	1
Gavin Rees	Lightweight	Newbridge	Nov 2010 - Feb 2011 (vacated); Jul 2012–Present	0
Gary Buckland	Super featherweight	Cardiff	Sep 2011–Present	2
Lee Selby	Featherweight	Barry	Oct 2011–Present	3
Enzo Maccarinelli	Cruiserweight	Swansea	March 2012 – Present	0

=== European boxing champions from Wales ===
Name	Weight	From	Duration of reign	Successful defences
Jim Driscoll	Featherweight	Cardiff	Jun 1912 - > Dec 1919	
Percy Jones	Flyweight	Porth	Jan 1914 - > Mar 1914	
Jimmy Wilde	Lightweight	Merthyr Tydfil	Feb 1916 - Mar 1917	0
Johnny Basham	Welterweight	Newport	Sep 1919 - Jun 1920	0
Johnny Basham	Middleweight	Newport	May 1921 - Oct 1921	0
Eddie Thomas	Welterweight	Merthyr Tydfil	Feb 1951 - Jun 1951	0
Dai Dower	Flyweight	Abercynon	Mar 1955 - Oct 1955	0
Dick Richardson	Heavyweight	Newport	Mar 1960 - Jun 1962	3
Howard Winstone	Featherweight	Merthyr Tydfil	Jan 1968 - Jul 1968	0
Johnny Owen	Bantamweight	Merthyr Tydfil	Feb 1980	0
Colin Jones	Welterweight	Swansea	Nov 1982 - (vacated)	0
Steve Robinson	Featherweight	Cardiff	Dec 1999 - Jun 2000	0
Jason Cook	Lightweight	Maesteg	Aug 2002 - Jan 2003	0
Nathan Cleverly	Light-Heavyweight	Cefn Fforest	Feb 2010 -	0
Enzo Maccarinelli	Cruiserweight	Swansea	Apr 2010 - Sep 2010	0
Gavin Rees	Lightweight	Newbridge	Jun 2011 -	3
Kerry Hope	Middleweight	Merthyr	Mar 2012 - Jul 2012	0

=== World boxing champions from Wales ===
Name	From	Weight	Belt	Duration of reign	Successful defences
Percy Jones	Porth	Flyweight	World	Jan 1914	0
Freddie Welsh	Pontypridd	Lightweight	World	Jul 1914 - May 1917	11 (excluding NWS)
Jimmy Wilde	Merthyr Tydfil	Flyweight	World	Dec 1916 - Jun 1923	15 (excluding NWS)
Howard Winstone	Merthyr Tydfil	Featherweight	World	Jan 1968 - Jul 1968	0
Steve Robinson	Cardiff	Featherweight	WBO	Apr 1993 - Sep 1995	7
Robbie Regan	Caerphilly	Bantamweight	WBO	Apr 1996 - 1996	0
Joe Calzaghe	Newbridge	Super-Middleweight	WBO	Oct 1997 - Sep 2008	21
Joe Calzaghe	Newbridge	Super-Middleweight	IBF	Mar 2006 - Nov 2006	1
Joe Calzaghe	Newbridge	Super-Middleweight	WBA	Nov 2007 - Jun 2008	0
Joe Calzaghe	Newbridge	Super-Middleweight	WBC	Nov 2007 - Jun 2008	0
Joe Calzaghe	Newbridge	Super-Middleweight	The Ring	March 2006 – September 2008	3
Joe Calzaghe	Newbridge	Light-Heavyweight	The Ring	April 2008 – February 2009	1
Barry Jones	Cardiff	Super-Featherweight	WBO	Dec 1997 - 1998	0
Enzo Maccarinelli	Swansea	Cruiserweight	WBO	Sep 2006 - Mar 2008	4
Gavin Rees	Newbridge	Light-Welterweight	WBA	Jul 2007 - Mar 2008	0
Nathan Cleverly	Cefn Fforest	Light-Heavyweight	WBO	May 2011 - Aug 2013	4
Lee Selby	Barry	Featherweight	IBF	May 2015 - May 2018	5
Joe Cordina	Cardiff	Super-Featherweight	IBF	June 2022-	0

NWS: Newspaper decisions

== Bibliography ==
- Davies, John; Jenkins, Nigel (2008). The Welsh Academy Encyclopaedia of Wales. Cardiff: University of Wales Press. ISBN 978-0-7083-1953-6.
- Davies, Lawrence (2011). Mountain Fighters, Lost Tales of Welsh Boxing. Cardiff: Peerless Press. ISBN 978-0-9570342-0-4.
- Lee, Tony (2009). All in My Corner: A tribute to some forgotten Welsh boxing heroes. Ammanford: TL Associates. ISBN 978-0-9564456-0-5.
- Stead, Peter; Williams, Gareth, eds. (2008). Wales and its Boxers, The Fighting Tradition. Cardiff: University of Wales Press. ISBN 978-0-7083-1915-4.
