= Kevin Pritchard (boxer) =

British boxer

Personal information
- Nationality: British
- Born: 26 September 1961 (age 64) Ipswich, England
- Height: 5 ft 5 in (165 cm)
- Weight: Super featherweight Featherweight

Boxing career

Boxing record
- Total fights: 48
- Wins: 22
- Win by KO: 11
- Losses: 22
- Draws: 4

Kevin Pritchard (born 26 September 1961) is a British former boxer who was British super featherweight champion between 1990 and 1991.

== Career ==
Born in Ipswich and raised in Liverpool, Pritchard began boxing at the age of 10, a member of the English Electric ABC, and later Kirkby ABC.

He made his professional debut at lightweight in December 1981, fighting a draw with JJ Barrett. With only one defeat in his first 12 fights, he was stopped by Glyn Rhodes in November 1982 in a fight for the vacant BBBofC Central Area lightweight title.

Over the next two years he fought with mixed results, losing to Mohammed Kawoya, Michael Harris, Pat Cowdell, and Ian McLeod, but beating Steve Sims. In October 1985 he faced Najib Daho for the vacant BBBofC Central Area super featherweight title, losing narrowly on points. He was beaten a month later by John Feeney.

Between 1986 and 1989 he won only two fights, against Pat Doherty and Rocky Lawlor, with defeats at the hands of Vincenzo Limatola, John Doherty, Jean-Baptiste Mendy, Jean-Marc Renard, Gianni Di Napoli, Mark Reefer, and Harry Escott.

He started 1990 with a draw against Nigel Haddock, and after beating Escott in May got a British title shot in October when he faced super featherweight champion Hugh Forde; Pritchard stopped Forde in the fourth round to become British champion. He held the title until his first defence in March 1991, when he was stopped in the eighth round by Robert Dickie.

He dropped down to featherweight to challenge for Colin McMillan's British title in September 1991; McMillan stopped him in the seventh round, and Pritchard subsequently retired from boxing.
