= Boxing at the 1986 Commonwealth Games =

Boxing competitions

- Venue: Ingliston Showground Pavilion
- Location: Edinburgh, Scotland
- Dates: 24 July to 2 August 1986

Boxing at the 1986 Commonwealth Games was the 13th appearance of the Boxing at the Commonwealth Games. The events were held in Edinburgh, Scotland, from 24 July to 2 August 1986. The competition featured contests in twelve weight classes, an increase of one from 1982, with the addition of a super-heavyweight division.

The boxing events were held at the Ingliston Showground Pavilion (also called the Exhibition Hall) in Ingliston. For the Games, scaffolding seats were brought in to expand the capacity to 7,000.

Canada topped the boxing medal table by virtue of winning six gold medals.

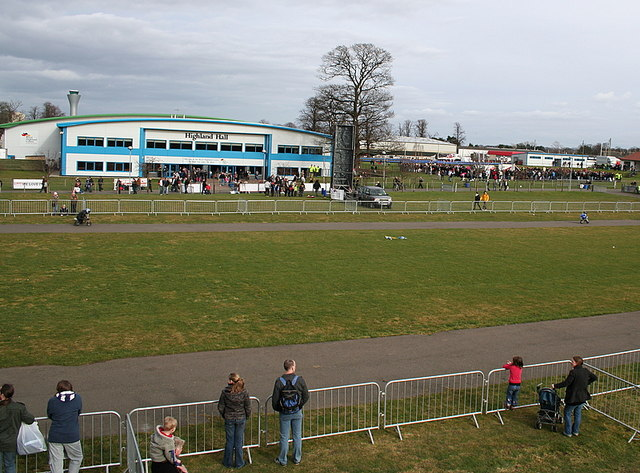
Exhibition Hall on the Ingliston Showground

== Medal table ==
* Host nation (Scotland)

Rank	Nation	Gold	Silver	Bronze	Total
1	Canada	6	0	4	10
2	England	5	2	3	10
3	New Zealand	1	0	1	2
4	Scotland*	0	3	4	7
5	Australia	0	3	0	3
6	Wales	0	2	3	5
7	Northern Ireland	0	1	5	6
8	Swaziland	0	1	0	1
9	Malawi	0	0	2	2
10	Jersey	0	0	1	1
Totals (10 entries)		12	12	23	47

== Medallists ==
Event	Gold	Silver	Bronze
Light Flyweight	Scotty Olson (CAN)	Mark Epton (ENG)	Johnston Todd (NIR); Wilson Docherty (SCO)
Flyweight	John Lyon (ENG)	Leonard Makhanya (SWZ)	Kerry Webber (WAL); Steve Beaupré (CAN)
Bantamweight	Sean Murphy (ENG)	Roy Nash (NIR)	Glen Brooks (SCO); John Sillitoe (JER)
Featherweight	Billy Downey (CAN)	Peter English (ENG)	Chris Carleton (NIR); Johnny Wallace (NZL)
Lightweight	Asif Dar (CAN)	Neil Haddock (WAL)	Lyton Mphande (MAW); Joey Jacobs (ENG)
Light Welterweight	Howard Grant (CAN)	David Clencie (AUS)	Brendan Lowe (NIR); Solomon Kondowe (MAW)
Welterweight	Darren Dyer (ENG)	James McAllister (SCO)	John Shaw (CAN); Damien Denny (NIR)
Light Middleweight	Dan Sherry (CAN)	Rick Finch (AUS)	Glyn Thomas (WAL); Alec Mullen (SCO)
Middleweight	Rod Douglas (ENG)	Jeff Harding (AUS)	Patrick Tinney (NIR); George Ferrie (SCO)
Light Heavyweight	Jim Moran (ENG)	Harry Lawson (SCO)	Brent Kosolofski (CAN)
Heavyweight	Jimmy Thunder (NZL)	Doug Young (SCO)	Dominic D'Amico (CAN); Eric Cardouza (ENG)
Super Heavyweight	Lennox Lewis (CAN)	Aneurin Evans (WAL)	James Oyebola (ENG)

== Results ==
=== Light-flyweight 48kg ===
Round	Winner	Loser	Score
Quarter-Final	(England) Mark Epton	(Wales) Robbie Regan	PTS
Semi-Final	(Canada) Scotty Olson	(Northern Ireland) Johnston Todd	RSC 1
Semi-Final	(England) Mark Epton	(Scotland) Wilson Docherty	RSC 2
Final	(Canada) Scotty Olson	(England) Mark Epton	PTS

=== Flyweight 51kg ===
Round	Winner	Loser	Score
Quarter-Final	(Canada) Steve Beaupre	(Scotland) Drew Docherty	PTS
Semi-Final	(Eswatini) Leonard Makhanya	(Wales) Kerry Webber	RSC 1
Semi-Final	(England) John Lyon	(Canada) Steve Beaupre	PTS
Final	(England) John Lyon	(Eswatini) Leonard Makhanya	KO 2

=== Bantamweight 54kg ===
Round	Winner	Loser	Score
Preliminary	(Canada) Chuck Evans	(New Zealand) Shane Buckley	PTS
Quarter-Final	(Northern Ireland) Roy Nash	(Vanuatu) Edouard Paulum	RSC 3
Quarter-Final	(Jersey) John Sillitoe	(Canada) Chuck Evans	PTS
Quarter-Final	(Scotland) Glen Brooks	(Wales) Sean Ward	PTS
Quarter-Final	(England) Sean Murphy	(Eswatini) Paul Kunene	RSC 1
Semi-Final	(England) Sean Murphy	(Scotland) Glen Brooks	PTS
Semi-Final	(Northern Ireland) Roy Nash	(Jersey) John Sillitoe	PTS
Final	(England) Sean Murphy	(Northern Ireland) Roy Nash	RSC 3

=== Featherweight 57kg ===
Round	Winner	Loser	Score
Preliminary	(Northern Ireland) Chris Carleton	(Scotland) Charlie Kane	RSC 2
Preliminary	(Wales) Tony Khan	(Fiji) Vereniki Raiwaliu	PTS
Quarter-Final	(New Zealand) Johnny Wallace	(Malawi) John Mkangala	PTS
Quarter-Final	(Canada) Billy Downey	(Australia) Roger Spiteri	PTS
Quarter-Final	(England) Peter English	(Eswatini) Calvin Magagula	RSC 3
Quarter-Final	(Northern Ireland) Chris Carleton	(Wales) Tony Khan	PTS
Semi-Final	(England) Peter English	(Northern Ireland) Chris Carleton	RSC 2
Semi-Final	(Canada) Billy Downey	(New Zealand) Johnny Wallace	RSC 3
Final	(Canada) Billy Downey	(England) Peter English	RSC 1

=== Lightweight 60kg ===
Round	Winner	Loser	Score
Quarter-Final	(Canada) Asif Dar	(Northern Ireland) Gerard McKenna	RSC 2
Quarter-Final	(England) Joey Jacobs	(Australia) Brian Williams	PTS
Semi-Final	(Wales) Neil Haddock	(Malawi) Byron Mphande	PTS
Semi-Final	(Canada) Asif Dar	(England) Joey Jacobs	RSC 3
Final	(Canada) Asif Dar	(Wales) Neil Haddock	KO 1

=== Light-welterweight 63.5kg ===
Round	Winner	Loser	Score
Preliminary	(Canada) Howard Grant	(Wales) Jonathan Alsop	PTS
Quarter-Final	(Malawi) Solomon Kondowe	(Vanuatu) Harry Kalo	RSC 2
Quarter-Final	(Australia) David Clencie	(New Zealand) Apelu Ioane	PTS
Quarter-Final	(Northern Ireland) Brendan Lowe	(Scotland) Jim Pender	PTS
Quarter-Final	(Canada) Howard Grant	(Eswatini) Musa Lushabao	RSC 2
Semi-Final	(Australia) David Clencie	(Malawi) Solomon Kondowe	PTS
Semi-Final	(Canada) Howard Grant	(Northern Ireland) Brendan Lowe	RSC 3
Final	(Canada) Howard Grant	(Australia) David Clencie	PTS

=== Welterweight 67kg ===
Round	Winner	Loser	Score
Preliminary	(Singapore) Mohamed Mukhlis	(Malawi) Fletcher Kapito	PTS
Preliminary	(Australia) Darren Obah	(Eswatini) John Dlamini	RSC 3
Preliminary	(England) Darren Dyer	(Wales) Cliff Piper	RSC 1
Quarter-Final	(Northern Ireland) Damien Denny	(Singapore) Mohamed Mukhlis	PTS
Quarter-Final	(Canada) John Shaw	(Samoa) Tauvela Ioane	PTS
Quarter-Final	(Scotland) James McAllister	(Cayman Islands) Sterling Ebanks	PTS
Quarter-Final	(England) Darren Dyer	(Australia) Darren Obah	KO 2
Semi-Final	(Scotland) James McAllister	(Canada) John Shaw	PTS
Semi-Final	(England) Darren Dyer	(Northern Ireland) Damien Denny	PTS
Final	(England) Darren Dyer	(Scotland) James McAllister	RSCI 1

=== Light-middleweight 71kg ===
Round	Winner	Loser	Score
Quarter-Final	(Wales) Glyn Thomas	(Eswatini) Charles Mahlabele	PTS
Quarter-Final	(Canada) Dan Sherry	(Northern Ireland) Brendan O'Hara	PTS
Quarter-Final	(Australia) Richard Finch	(Malawi) George Nyirenda	PTS
Quarter-Final	(Scotland) Alec Mullen	(Samoa) Seese Fidow	PTS
Semi-Final	(Canada) Dan Sherry	(Wales) Glyn Thomas	RSC 1
Semi-Final	(Australia) Richard Finch	(Scotland) Alec Mullen	PTS
Final	(Canada) Dan Sherry	(Australia) Richard Finch	PTS

=== Middleweight 75kg ===
Round	Winner	Loser	Score
Preliminary	(Fiji) Vodo Matai	(Malawi) Helman Palije	DQ 3
Quarter-Final	(England) Rod Douglas	(Canada) Egerton Marcus	RSC 2
Quarter-Final	(Scotland) George Ferrie	(Vanuatu) James Iahuat	RSC 2
Quarter-Final	(Australia) Jeff Harding	(Wales) Paul Lewis	RSC 3
Quarter-Final	(Northern Ireland) Patrick Tinney	(Fiji) Vodo Matai	RSC 1
Semi-Final	(England) Rod Douglas	(Scotland) George Ferrie	RSC 1
Semi-Final	(Australia) Jeff Harding	(Northern Ireland) Patrick Tinney	AB 2
Final	(England) Rod Douglas	(Australia) Jeff Harding	PTS

=== Light-heavyweight 81kg ===
Round	Winner	Loser	Score
Quarter-Final	(Canada) Brent Kosolofski	(New Zealand) Raeli Raeli	PTS
Quarter-Final	(England) Jim Moran	(Samoa) Pua Ulberg	RSC 2
Quarter-Final	(Scotland) Harry Lawson	(Northern Ireland) Gerald Storey	PTS
Quarter-Final	(Wales) Byron Pullen	(Cayman Islands) Noel Thomas	PTS
Semi-Final	(England) Jim Moran	(Canada) Brent Kosolofski	PTS
Semi-Final	(Scotland) Harry Lawson	(Wales) Byron Pullen	DQ 3
Final	(England) Jim Moran	(Scotland) Harry Lawson	PTS

=== Heavyweight 91kg ===
Round	Winner	Loser	Score
Semi-Final	(Scotland) Doug Young	(England) Eric Cardouza	PTS
Semi-Final	(New Zealand) Jimmy Peau	(Canada) Domenico D'Amico	KO 3
Final	(New Zealand) Jimmy Peau	(Scotland) Doug Young	KO 3

=== Super Heavyweight +91kg ===
Round	Winner	Loser	Score
Semi-Final	(Canada) Lennox Lewis	(England) James Oyebola	SC 2
Final	(Canada) Lennox Lewis	(Wales) Aneurin Evans	RSC 2
