= Damien Denny =

Northern Irish boxer (born 1966)

Personal information
- Nationality: British (Northern Irish)
- Born: 20 April 1966 (age 60) Lisburn, Northern Ireland
- Height: 175 cm (5 ft 9 in)

Sport
- Sport: Boxing
- Events: Welterweight; Light-middleweight
- Club: Holy Trinity BC, Belfast
Medal record
Representing Northern Ireland
Commonwealth Games
Bronze medal – third place	1986 Edinburgh	welterweight

Damien Denny (born 20 April 1966) is a former boxer who won a bronze medal at the Commonwealth Games for Northern Ireland.

== Biography ==
Born in Lisburn, but raised in Belfast, Denny stands 5 ft 9 in (175 cm).

Denny represented the 1986 Northern Irish team for the 1986 Commonwealth Games in Edinburgh, Scotland, where he competed in the welterweight category, He won a bronze medal after beating Mohamed Mukhlis of Singapore in the quarter-final, before losing the semi-final bout to England's Darren Dyer.

In November 1986 the Northern Irish boxing team were involved in a backlash following criticism of boxing standards in a written report by Northern Ireland's Commonwealth Games manager Dick McColgan. Five of the team (including Damien Denny) threatened to hand back their medals in protest.

In 1989 as a professional his career was threatened by hairline fractures in both hands but he recovered to continue fighting and took part in 23 professional bouts from 1987 to 1995.

He collaborated on the boxing-related films, About Five Minutes (1999) and The Boxer (1997). He played Eddie Carroll in the latter film, which starred Daniel Day-Lewis and Emily Watson, and was set in Denny's native Belfast.
