= Dan Sherry =

Canadian boxer

Personal information
- Nationality: (Canada) Canadian
- Born: Dan Sherry Hamilton, Ontario, Canada
- Height: 6 ft 0 in (183cm)
- Weight: Light middleweight Middleweight

Boxing career
- Reach: 70 in (178cm)
- Stance: Orthodox

Boxing record
- Total fights: 28
- Wins: 22
- Win by KO: 10
- Losses: 6
Medal record
Men's amateur boxing
Representing Canada
Commonwealth Games
Gold medal – first place	1986 Edinburgh	Light middleweight

Dan Sherry was a Canadian former professional boxer who won a gold medal at the 1986 Commonwealth Games and held the Canadian Middleweight title from 1990 to 1991.

== Early life ==
Dan Sherry was born in Hamilton, Ontario, Canada. He later moved to Burlington, Ontario, and graduated from Aldershot School.

== Amateur boxing career ==
At the age of ten, Dan Sherry started training at McGrory's Boxing Club in Hamilton.

At 15, Dan Sherry gained recognition in 1981 by winning the Canadian national junior C light-middleweight championship in British Columbia, later adding Ontario Golden Gloves titles at intermediate lightweight and junior light-middleweight. While at Aldershot High School, he joined a new local boxing club to advance his training. At Toronto's Cabbagetown Youth Centre, he was coached by Peter Wylie and was a stablemate of Shawn O'Sullivan.

He captured the Canadian intermediate middleweight title in Montreal in 1982 against three older opponents and confirmed his status at the Canada Winter Games in Chicoutimi in February 1983 with a second-round TKO of Gary Woods from B.C.

Sherry earned international recognition in Ireland in April 1983 and later won three bouts on a September tour of Scandinavia, including victories over Per Jakobsson in Stockholm and Mika Koibule in Oulu and Tampere. In November 1983, he competed at the World Junior Boxing Championships in the Dominican Republic, finishing third after a semifinal loss to Batista, the eventual champion.

He was sidelined from the 1984 Winter Olympics by a hand injury. At the Ontario Senior Championships in Peterborough in March 1984, he reinjured it in his first fight and lost in the final, failing to qualify for the Canadian Olympic team.

He claimed the Ontario senior middleweight title in London, Ontario in December 1984 after three unanimous wins and was recognized as the tournament's outstanding boxer. His win earned him a trip to the Canadian Senior Amateur Boxing Championships in Medicine Hat in 1985. He won the senior middleweight title over Darrell Flint of Halifax.

Sherry lost to East Germany's Henry Maske by unanimous decision in the middleweight semifinal match of the 1985 World Cup amateur boxing championships at Seoul, South Korea. Following the bronze medal that placed him third in the world, he won the light middleweight gold at the 1985 Quebec Cup International in Sherbrooke.

He represented Canada at the 1986 Commonwealth Games in Edinburgh, Scotland. He was the gold medalist in the light middleweight class with a decision over Australia's Richard Finch.

=== 1986 Commonwealth Games results ===
Below are the results of Dan Sherry, a Canadian light middleweight boxer who competed at the 1986 Commonwealth Games:

- Quarterfinal: defeated Brendan O'Hara (Ireland) by decision
- Semifinal: defeated Glynn Thomas (Wales) by RSC 1
- Final: defeated Richard Finch (Australia) by decision

In March 1987, he lost his senior title to rival Ray Downey at the National Amateur Boxing Championships but later secured two decision wins over Downey at the box-offs and the Canadian National Pan Am Games Trials in May 1987. After qualifying for the 1987 Pan American Games in Indianapolis, he advanced to the quarterfinals and lost to Freddy Sanchez.

Sherry beat Orestes Solano in August 1987 at Roy Thomson Hall and became the North American amateur light middleweight champion.

At the February 1988 President's Cup in Jakarta, Indonesia, he was refused permission to fight in the gold medal bout due to a rib injury and settled for silver.

Dan Sherry lost a controversial Olympic qualifier in May in Lethbridge and missed the 1988 Seoul Olympics in September. Facing Richie Woodhall of England, he captured his weight division in the finals of the Canada Cup international tournament in June 1988 in Ottawa.

== Professional career ==
At a Toronto press conference for the Donny Lalonde vs. Sugar Ray Leonard title fight, Sherry met Leonard's manager, Mike Trainer, who invited him to spar at Sugar Ray Leonard's camp in the Pocono Mountains. The stay extended to more than a month, and in October 1988 Sherry signed a four-year deal with Trainer to launch his pro career. He was trained by Pepe Correa.

Sherry, who had over 200 amateur bouts, made his pro debut on the Donny Lalonde-Sugar Ray Leonard card in November 1988 at Caesars Palace. He scored a technical knockout over Johnny Apollo in the third round of a scheduled four-round middleweight bout.

He beat Darrell Flint, who he fought in the amateur ranks, to win the Canadian Middleweight Championship in August 1990 in Hamilton, Ontario.

Dan Sherry entered the ring 17–0 on February 23, 1991, to face undefeated 25-0 Chris Eubank in his first WBO Middleweight title defense. He lost by technical split decision after a headbutt from Eubank in round ten left him unable to continue.

He won the Canadian Middleweight Championship in May 1991 after outboxing Gerry Meekison. He later lost his Canadian title to 14-0 Otis Grant.

Sherry faced 32-2 Nigel Benn on February 19, 1992, losing by third-round TKO, and subsequently lost a split-decision bout to Doug DeWitt.

He challenged Vincent Pettway for the IBF Super Welterweight championship in 1993 but was stopped by TKO in Baltimore. He followed a knockout win with a December 1993 title shot in Aspen against Vinny Pazienza for the vacant IBO World Super Middleweight championship. He was knocked out in the eleventh round in what proved to be his final bout.

== Professional boxing record ==
28 fights	22 wins	6 losses
By knockout	10	4
By decision	12	2

Dan Sherry retired with a pro record of 22–6 with 10 knockouts.

== Awards and recognitions ==
- 1984 Burlington Post Athlete of the Year Award
