= Brent Kosolofski =

Canadian boxer

Personal information
- Nickname: Koko
- Born: Ronald Brent Kosolofski; 22 August 1964 (age 62) Calgary, Alberta, Canada
- Died: 2024-10-14 Calgary, Alberta
- Weight: light heavy/cruiser/heavyweight

Boxing career

Boxing record
- Total fights: 17
- Wins: 16 (KO 14)
- Losses: 1

Brent "Koko" Kosolofski (born 22 August 1964) is a Canadian former professional boxer who competed from 1990 to 1996. As an amateur, he represented Canada at the 1988 Summer Olympics.

== Career ==
Competing at light heavyweight as an amateur, Kosolofski represented Canada at the 1986 World Championships in Reno, Nevada, United States, losing to John Beckles of England. He won the bronze medal at the 1986 Commonwealth Games, in Edinburgh, Scotland, losing to eventual gold medal winner James Moran. At the 1988 Summer Olympics in Seoul, South Korea, he lost to Andrea Magi of Italy.

As a professional Kosolofski won the Commonwealth light heavyweight title. His professional fighting weight varied from 173 lb (78 kg; 12 st 5 lb), i.e. light heavyweight to 199 lb (90 kg; 14 st 3 lb), i.e. heavyweight.
