= Billy Downey =

Canadian boxer (1967–2012)

Personal information
- Nickname: Dynamite
- Nationality: (Canada) Canadian
- Born: William Downey; October 28, 1967 Halifax, Nova Scotia, Canada
- Died: October 3, 2012 (aged 44) Toronto, Ontario, Canada
- Weight: Featherweight

Boxing career
- Stance: Southpaw
Medal record
Men's amateur boxing
Representing Canada
Commonwealth Games
Gold medal – first place	1986 Edinburgh	Featherweight

Billy Downey (October 28, 1967 – October 3, 2012) was a Canadian former boxer who won a gold medal at the 1986 Commonwealth Games.

== Early life ==
William "Bill" Downey was born on October 28, 1967, in Halifax, Nova Scotia.

== Amateur boxing career ==
Downey began boxing in 1976. He trained at the Citadel Boxing Club under national boxing coach Taylor Gordon, alongside his cousin Ray Downey.

He won the featherweight title at the CABA Canadian Intermediate Boxing Championships in Halifax on May 6, 1984. He was named fighter of the intermediate tournament.

The following year, he won a bronze medal at the Stockholm Invitational Boxing Open in January 1985 and claimed silver at the Canadian Intermediate National Boxing Championships in April.

He fought at the World Boxing Championships in Reno, Nevada in May 1986. The 125-pounder scored a 3–2 upset over Seric Nurkazov, the reigning Soviet and 1983 European champion. He was defeated in the quarterfinals by Kelcie Banks, the eventual gold medalist.

Billy Downey was a gold medalist in the featherweight classification for Canada at the 1986 Commonwealth Games in Edinburgh, Scotland. The results were:

=== 1986 Commonwealth Games results ===
  - Quarterfinal: Defeated Roger Spiteri (Australia) by decision, 5–0
  - Semifinal: Defeated Johnny Wallace (New Zealand) by KO in 1st round
  - Final: Defeated Peter English (England) by KO in 1st round

He was voted "Best Overall Boxer" of the XIII Commonwealth Games Boxing Tournament.

The Nova Scotian boxer won his first senior national title in March 1986 in Cornwall, Ontario.

At the Feliks Stamm Memorial in Warsaw, Poland, in November 1986, he captured a gold medal by defeating Grzegorz Jabłoński.

On December 7, 1986, he competed in the Quebec Cup at the Complexe sportif Claude-Robillard. He knocked out France's Eric Tormos in the first round for the 60-kilogram title.

Downey won a silver medal at the tenth annual President's Cup in Jakarta, Indonesia, in February 1987. At the Canadian senior box-off championships in May 1987, the defending champion retained his title and qualified for Canada's Pan Am Games team.

On May 20, 1987, Downey survived a car accident in Halifax with minor injuries after the car he was in plunged off an overpass, landed upside down, and fell almost 20 meters onto railway tracks, cutting his forehead on the guardrail.

The Halifax featherweight represented Canada at the 1987 Pan American Games in Indianapolis in August 1987. In the preliminary round, Downey stopped Aruba's Rense Richardson with a technical knockout at 2:40 of round one. He advanced to the tournament quarterfinals, where he lost to Esteban Flores.

When he returned, his absence from training fueled his distractibility. After moving to Toronto, he was sentenced to six months in jail in October 1987.

== Death ==
Billy Downey died on October 3, 2012, in Toronto, Ontario, Canada, at 45.
