= Jonathan Kumuteo =

British professional boxer

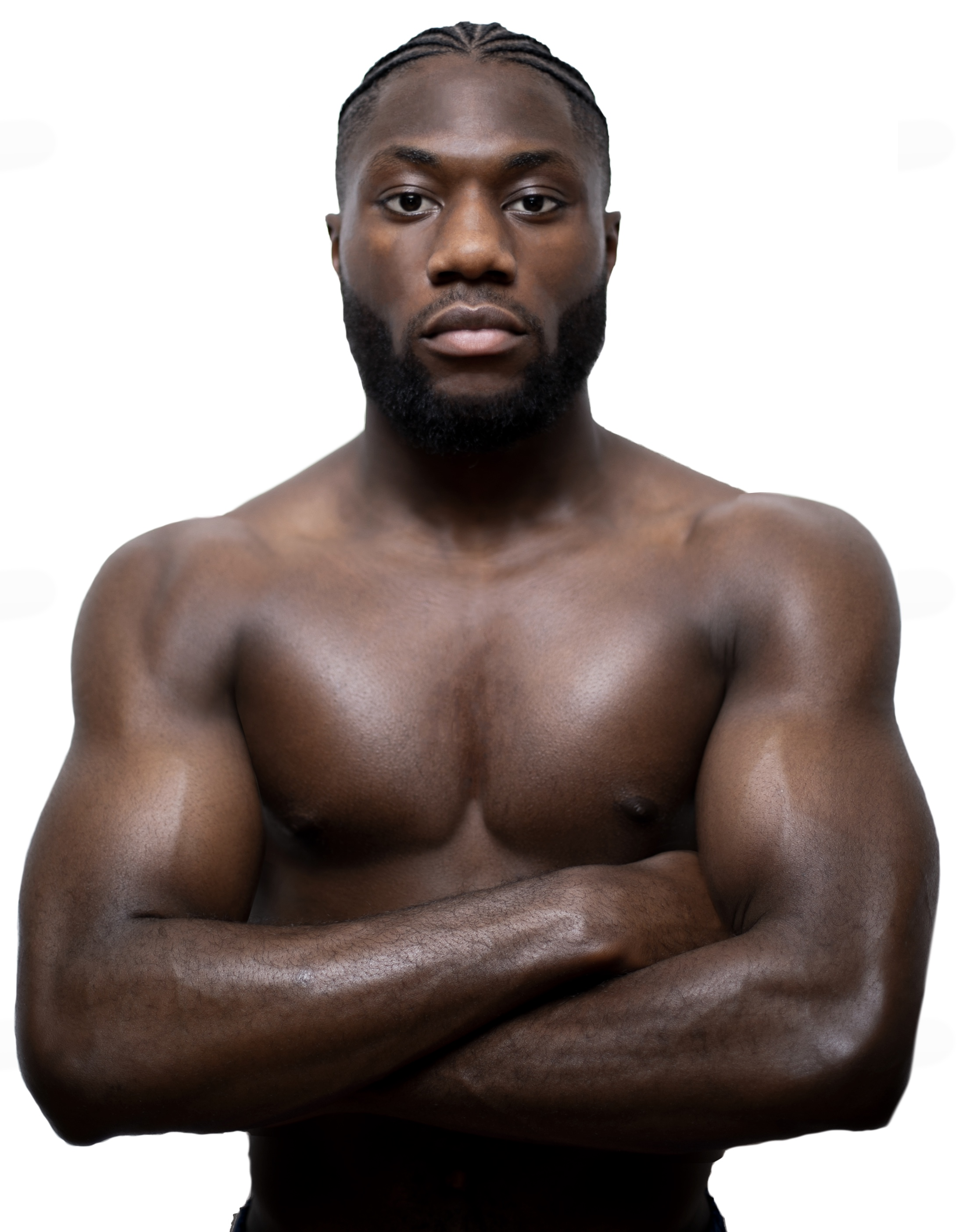
- Kumuteo in May 2020

Personal information
- Nicknames: JK, jkboxing
- Nationality: Congolese; British
- Born: 5 November 1995 (age 30) Lubumbashi, Democratic Republic of the Congo
- Height: 5 ft 11 in (180 cm)
- Weight: Welterweight

Boxing career
- Reach: 72 in (183 cm)
- Stance: Orthodox

Jonathan Kumuteo (born 5 November 1995) is a Congolese-born British professional boxer. As an amateur, he won the London ABA Championships.

== Early life ==
Kumuteo was born in Lubumbashi, Democratic Republic of the Congo (then known as Zaire). Kumuteo escaped war-torn Congo to Lusaka, Zambia during the Civil War. In March 2003, at the age of 7 years old, Kumuteo was woken up in the middle of the night by his mother and put on a plane to travel over 12,000 km to London, United Kingdom from Lusaka, Zambia by himself.

After settling into life in the United Kingdom, Kumuteo joined the Sea Cadets when he was nine years old. During his time in the Sea Cadets, he gained numerous qualifications; BTEC in Marine Engineering, Royal Yachting Association (RYA), and British Canoeing qualifications. Kumuteo left the Sea Cadets at the age of 16 when he was ranked Leading Cadet; he was forced to choose between boxing or the Cadets due to a clash in training schedules.

== Amateur career ==
Kumuteo began his amateur boxing career with a win on the 13th of October 2012 at the Royal Lancaster Hotel in London, competing for Finchley Amateur Boxing Club at the age of 16.

He won the London ABA Championships and went on to become a national medallist in the Senior National ABA England championships competing at Light Middleweight (71 kg).

Kumuteo was selected to represent Congo in the 2020 African Boxing Olympic Qualification Tournament but turned down the opportunity because he had to undergo surgery and feared he would not be recovered in time for the 2020 Tokyo Olympic Games qualification tournament.

== Professional career ==
Kumuteo was scheduled to make his professional debut live on BT Sport in April 2020. However, the show was postponed due to the COVID-19 pandemic. He is now set to make his professional debut behind closed doors at the BT Sport Studio in London, broadcast live on BT Sport. Kumuteo has signed a long-term professional contract with BT Sport, Hall of Fame boxing promoter Frank Warren and Queensberry Promotions.

Kumuteo trains under the tutelage of Sean Murphy, a former Commonwealth Games Gold medallist, British and Commonwealth champion, and World Title challenger.

== Health problems ==
Kumuteo has suffered from hidradenitis suppurativa (HS) which is a rare and painful, long-term skin condition that causes repeated abscesses and scarring on the skin. He battled with hidradenitis suppurativa, also known as acne inversa, for over 4 years, and was forced to undergo three surgeries, two of which were unsuccessful.

After being repeatedly told by doctors he would never box again due to his hidradenitis suppurativa symptoms being severe, Kumuteo's determination and unwillingness to give up his boxing career enabled him to win the London ABA Championships.

In July 2018, a specialist dermatologist informed Kumuteo that as an athlete, his body had only been functioning at 50% due to the long-term medication he had to take in order to contain the skin disease. Namely, it was causing severe fatigue and suppressing his immune system alongside other side effects.

On 8 November 2018, Kumuteo underwent a reconstructive skin graft operation at the Royal Free Hospital in London by specialist plastic surgeon Dr Barbara Jemec. The operation, which took Kumuteo 12 weeks to recover from, was successful. In May 2020, Kumuteo spoke about how he feels in the present day. Following a gruelling process that left gaping wounds under his arms and other parts of his body for over 4 years, Kumuteo added:

I am completely recovered. I thank God, Doctor Barbara Jemec and her Team at the Royal Free Hospital in London for the super successful skin graft operation I had which, has completely healed. It has freed me from suffering from the skin disease. Therefore, I no longer require any treatment.

== Activism ==
Kumuteo has delivered motivational talks and workshops to students across the United Kingdom, including Independent, Special Educational Needs (SEN), Junior, Primary, Secondary and Sixth Form Colleges.

Kumuteo is also an ambassador for Gloves Up Knives Down, a charity committed to supporting young people living in communities affected by knife crime. It provides access to boxing training, encouraging young people to embrace all the benefits the sport brings to help them lead fulfilling and healthy lives away from crime.

Having suffered from hidradenitis suppurativa, Kumuteo understands the impact the disease can have on one's life and therefore actively supports individuals who are living with it. This includes helping to raise awareness and also passing on his own first-hand experiences.
