= Pat Barrett (boxer) =

English boxer

Personal information
- Nickname: Black Flash
- Nationality: British
- Born: 22 July 1967 (age 58) Manchester, England
- Height: 5 ft 9 in (175 cm)
- Weight: Light welterweight; Welterweight; Light middleweight

Boxing career
- Reach: 68 in (173 cm)
- Stance: Orthodox

Boxing record
- Total fights: 42
- Wins: 37
- Win by KO: 28
- Losses: 4
- Draws: 1

Pat Barrett (born 22 July 1967) is a British former professional boxer and now a boxing trainer and promoter. He held the British light welterweight title from 1989 and 1990, and was the European champion from 1990 to 1992. He went on to fight for the WBO Welterweight World title.

== Early life ==
Pat Barrett was born on a council estate in North Manchester, England. Barrett walked into the Collyhurst and Moston Lads Club at the age of sixteen, following his brother Michael who was an amateur boxer.

== Amateur boxing career ==
Nicknamed 'Black Flash', Barrett was trained by Brian Hughes. After joining the Collyhurst and Moston Lads Club, Barrett became an area champion as an amateur, in which he competed in twenty-six amateur fights - winning twenty-four.

== Professional boxing career ==
Barrett made his professional debut at the age on 1 May 1987, with a win over Gary Barron. He won 13 of his first 15 fights, including a win over Dave McCabe, with a draw against Sugar Gibiliru, and the only defeat to Paul Burke.

In November 1988 he beat Kevin Plant on points in his home city to win the vacant BBBofC Central Area light welterweight title. He successfully defended this title against Gibiliru in April 1989, and Tony Willis four weeks later, and in October that year beat Robert Harkin on points at the Wolverhampton Civic Hall to take the British title. He relinquished the British title in 1990 to pursue higher honours. In August 1990 he challenged for Efrem Calamati's European title in Salerno, Italy, knocking the defending champion out in the fourth round to take the title. He made three successful defences of the European title, against Salvatore Nardino, Mark McCreath, and Racheed Lawal, stopping all three challengers. He relinquished the European title and moved up to welterweight. In July 1992 he challenged for Manning Galloway's WBO World welterweight title at the G-Mex Centre, losing a unanimous decision, after the fight had been postponed several times, a situation that led him to leave promoter Mickey Duff to join Frank Warren's stable. In September 1993 he faced Del Bryan for the vacant British welterweight title at the York Hall, Bethnal Green, Bryan taking the title on points. He moved up in weight again to light middleweight, and in November 1993 met Patrick Vungbo in Belgium for the vacant World Boxing Federation World title; Vungbo won on a split decision.

Legal problems led Barrett to leave the UK and travel to the United States to work with Lennox Lewis's former trainer John Davenport in the hope of securing a multi-fight contract and a second world title fight, and in March 1994 stopped journeyman Donnie Parker in four rounds. He returned to the UK, however, and shortly afterwards was arrested for failing to pay £6,000 of fines incurred for failing to produce his vehicle details after being repeatedly stopped by the police, and was declared bankrupt. He served three months in HM Prison Risley followed by 12 months probation. In December 1994, he beat Belgian champion Marino Monteyne in points in what proved to be his final fight, retiring the following year.

== Later life and career as trainer and promoter ==
In February 2003, Barrett was arrested after being found with a loaded pistol in a hotel room in Chingford, with small quantities of heroin and cannabis also found. He denied all knowledge of the gun and drugs, claiming that he was set up (he was arrested as a result of an anonymous tip off), but was sentenced to two consecutive three-month terms in prison. Barrett later described the sentence as "the best thing to happen to me. I got caught and it opened my eyes." On leaving prison, Barrett attempted to obtain a trainer's licence, a process which took him five years. Barrett went on to run a security company and work as a trainer at the Moston and Collyhurst Gym, initially under Hughes, but later running the gym with Thomas McDonagh after Hughes retired, working with boxers such as Scott Quigg, Matty Hall, Matty Askin, and Barrett's nephew Zelfa. In 2011, Barrett was granted a promoter's licence, initially working with Wally Dixon, and in 2014 formed Black Flash Promotions. In May 2019, it was announced that Frank Warren's for Queensberry Promotions and Barrett's Black Flash Promotions would be entering into a partnership agreement with the aim of developing and showcasing the future young stars of British boxing.

== Personal life ==
Barrett is the uncle of Commonwealth light-heavyweight champion Lyndon Arthur, and former Commonwealth super-featherweight champion Zelfa Barrett. On 25 December 2011, Barrett's nephew, John Lee Barrett, was attacked at a private party held at Sinclair's Bar in Rochdale, Greater Manchester, in which he later died from a single stab wound to the back.

== Professional boxing record ==
42 fights	37 wins	4 losses
By knockout	28	0
By decision	9	4
Draws	1	

No.	Result	Record	Opponent	Type	Round, time	Date	Location	Notes
42	Win	38–3–1	(Belgium) Marino Monteyne	PTS	8	12 Dec 1994	Izegem, Belgium	
41	Win	37–3–1	(United States) Donnie Parker	TKO	4 (8)	11 Mar 1994	(United Kingdom) Sharon, U.S.	
40	Loss	36–3–1	(Belgium) Patrick Vungbo	SD	12	1 Nov 1993	(United Kingdom) York Hall, London, England	For vacant WBF welterweight title
39	Loss	35–3–1	(United Kingdom) Del Bryan	PTS	12	22 Sep 1993	(United Kingdom) York Hall, London, England	For vacant British welterweight title
38	Win	35–2–1	(Chile) Juan Carlos Gonzalez Borquez	PTS	8	13 Feb 1993	(United Kingdom) Free Trade Hall, Manchester, England	
37	Win	34–2–1	(United States) Sam Gervins	TKO	1 (10)	19 Dec 1992	Palazzetto dello Sport, San Severo, Italy	
36	Win	33–2–1	(Mexico) Tomas Quinones	TKO	1 (8)	20 Nov 1992	Cassino, Italy	
35	Loss	32–2–1	(United States) Manning Galloway	UD	12	25 Jul 1992	(United Kingdom) G-Mex Centre, Manchester, England	For WBO welterweight title
34	Win	32–1–1	(United States) Mike Johnson	TKO	2 (10)	19 Dec 1991	(United Kingdom) Sports Centre, Oldham, England	
33	Win	31–1–1	(Denmark) Racheed Lawal	TKO	4 (12)	9 Oct 1991	(United Kingdom) G-Mex Centre, Manchester, England	Retained European light-welterweight title
32	Win	30–1–1	(United Kingdom) Mark McCreath	TKO	6 (12)	17 Apr 1991	(United Kingdom) Royal Albert Hall, London, England	Retained European light-welterweight title
31	Win	29–1–1	(Italy) Salvatore Nardino	KO	6 (12)	13 Feb 1991	(United Kingdom) Grand Hall, London, England	Retained European light-welterweight title
30	Win	28–1–1	(United Kingdom) Jimmy Harrison	RTD	1 (6), 3:00	16 Jan 1991	(United Kingdom) Royal Albert Hall, London, England	
29	Win	27–1–1	(Mexico) Eduardo Jaquez	TKO	1 (10)	15 Nov 1990	(United Kingdom) Sports Centre, Oldham, England	
28	Win	26–1–1	(United States) Dwayne Swift	PTS	10	4 Oct 1990	(United Kingdom) York Hall, London, England	
27	Win	25–1–1	(Italy) Efrem Calamati	KO	4 (12)	24 Aug 1990	Salerno, Italy	Won European light-welterweight title
26	Win	24–1–1	(Mexico) Juan Carlos Nunez	TKO	1 (8), 2:51	2 Jun 1990	(United Kingdom) G-Mex Centre, Manchester, England	
25	Win	23–1–1	(United States) Joey Ferrell	TKO	6 (10)	21 Nov 1989	(United Kingdom) Kelvin Hall, Glasgow, Scotland	
24	Win	22–1–1	(United Kingdom) Robert Harkin	PTS	12	24 Oct 1989	(United Kingdom) Wolverhampton Civic Hall, Wolverhampton, England	Retained British light-welterweight title
23	Win	21–1–1	(United States) Dana Roston	TKO	4 (8)	19 Sep 1989	(United Kingdom) London Arena, London, England	
22	Win	20–1–1	(United States) Robert Trevino	KO	2 (8), 1:46	27 Jun 1989	(United Kingdom) Bellahouston Leisure Centre, Glasgow, Scotland	
21	Win	19–1–1	(United States) John Rafuse	KO	6 (8), 1:46	7 Jun 1989	(United Kingdom) Wembley Arena, London, England	
20	Win	18–1–1	(United Kingdom) Tony Willis	KO	8 (10)	9 May 1989	(United Kingdom) St Albans City Hall, St Albans, England	Won vacant British light-welterweight title
19	Win	17–1–1	(United Kingdom) Sugar Gibiliru	KO	8 (10)	11 Apr 1989	(United Kingdom) Sports Centre, Oldham, England	Retained Central Area light-welterweight title
18	Win	16–1–1	(Belgium) Marc Delfosse	KO	1 (8), 1:34	28 Mar 1989	(United Kingdom) Kelvin Hall, Glasgow, Scotland	
17	Win	15–1–1	(United Kingdom) Dean Bramhald	TKO	7 (8), 0:45	6 Mar 1989	(United Kingdom) Edmiston Club, Glasgow, Scotland	
16	Win	14–1–1	(United Kingdom) Kevin Plant	PTS	10	29 Nov 1988	(United Kingdom) Bowlers Exhibition Centre, Manchester, England	Won vacant Central Area light-welterweight title
15	Win	13–1–1	(United Kingdom) Jeff Connors	TKO	5 (8), 2:58	1 Nov 1988	(United Kingdom) Kelvin Hall, Glasgow, Scotland	
14	Win	12–1–1	(United Kingdom) Dave Haggerty	TKO	7 (8)	10 Oct 1988	(United Kingdom) Edmiston Club, Glasgow, Scotland	
13	Win	11–1–1	(United Kingdom) Dave McCabe	TKO	2 (8)	8 Jun 1988	(United Kingdom) Edmiston Club, Glasgow, Scotland	
12	Win	10–1–1	(United Kingdom) Lenny Gloster	PTS	8	4 May 1988	(United Kingdom) Midlands Sporting Club, Solihull, England	
11	Win	9–1–1	(United Kingdom) Stanley Jones	TKO	2 (6)	12 Apr 1988	(United Kingdom) National Sports Centre, Cardiff, Wales	
10	Win	8–1–1	(United States) Donnie Parker	PTS	6	22 Mar 1988	(United States) Teamsters Local 557 Hall, Baltimore, Maryland, U.S.	
9	Draw	7–1–1	(United Kingdom) Sugar Gibiliru	PTS	8	1 Mar 1988	(United Kingdom) Midland Hotel, Manchester, England	
8	Win	7–1	(United Kingdom) Oliver Henry	TKO	2 (8), 1:04	8 Feb 1988	(United Kingdom) Anglo American Sporting Club, Manchester, England	
7	Win	6–1	(United Kingdom) Michael Howell	PTS	4	20 Oct 1987	(United Kingdom) European Sporting Club, Stoke-on-Trent, England	
6	Win	5–1	(United Kingdom) Mike Russell	PTS	6	3 Aug 1987	(United Kingdom) European Sporting Club, Stoke-on-Trent, England	
5	Win	4–1	(Switzerland) Iskender Savas	TKO	1 (8), 0:43	1 Jul 1987	Interlaken, Switzerland	
4	Win	3–1	(United Kingdom) Eamon Payne	TKO	3 (8), 1:35	13 Jun 1987	(United Kingdom) Great Yarmouth Hippodrome, Norfolk, England	
3	Loss	2–1	(United Kingdom) Paul Burke	PTS	6	1 Jun 1987	(United Kingdom) Yorkshire Executive Sporting Club, Bradford, England	
2	Win	2–0	(United Kingdom) Jim Moffat	RTD	1 (6)	18 May 1987	(United Kingdom) Hospitality Inn, Glasgow, Scotland	
1	Win	1–0	(United Kingdom) Gary Barron	TKO	6 (6)	1 May 1987	(United Kingdom) Wirrina Stadium, Peterborough, England	
