= Asif Dar =

Canadian boxer (born 1966)

Personal information
- Full name: Asif Kamran Dar
- Born: April 16, 1966 (age 60) Quetta, Pakistan
Medal record
Men's boxing
Representing Canada
Commonwealth Games
Gold medal – first place	1986 Edinburgh	Lightweight

Asif Kamran Dar (born April 16, 1966) is a former boxer from Pakistan, competing in the lightweight (– 60 kg) division. He was born in Quetta.

A resident of Toronto, Ontario he represented Pakistan at the 1984 Summer Olympics in Los Angeles, where he was eliminated in the second round. Afterwards he competed for Canada, representing that country at the 1988 Summer Olympics in Seoul, South Korea where he was also eliminated in the second round. He won the gold medal in the same weight division, two years earlier, at the 1986 Commonwealth Games, beating Welshman Neil Haddock in the final. He also represented Canada at the 1987 Pan American Games.
