= John Doherty (boxer) =

British former boxer

Personal information
- Nationality: British
- Born: 12 July 1962 (age 63) Bradford, England
- Height: 5 ft 4.5 in (164 cm)
- Weight: Featherweight; Super featherweight

Boxing career

Boxing record
- Total fights: 39
- Wins: 28
- Win by KO: 4
- Losses: 8
- Draws: 3

John Doherty (born 12 July 1962) is a British former boxer who was British super featherweight champion for three periods between 1986 and 1992.

== Career ==
Born in Bradford, Doherty made his professional debut in May 1982, losing by first round stoppage to Taffy Mills. After being unbeaten in his next 10 fights, he suffered a second defeat in September 1983 when he was beaten on points by Anthony Brown. Two months later he lost again (to Stuart Carmichael) but then put together an 11-fight unbeaten run which included a win over Steve Pollard to take the BBBofC Central Area featherweight title.

In 1986 the BBBofC introduced a British title at super featherweight, and John Doherty (who was also sometimes known as Pat Doherty) met Pat Doherty for the vacant title in January, John a late substitute for Najib Daho; The fight went the distance, with John Doherty getting the verdict by a single point to become British champion.

In April, Doherty lost the title when he was stopped in six rounds by Pat Cowdell.

In March 1989 Doherty challenged for Racheed Lawal's European title in Braedstrup, Denmark, losing by fourth round knockout. In September he regained the British title, stopping defending champion Floyd Havard in the penultimate round of 12 at Afan Lido. He lost the title in February 1990 when he was narrowly beaten on points by Joey Jacobs.

After Jacobs had vacated, Doherty faced Sean Murphy in May 1990 in an attempt to win it for a third time; Murphy knocked him out in the third round. In September 1991 he successfully challenged then champion Sugar Gibiliru for the title, winning on points. He lost the title for a third time in April 1992, Michael Armstrong stopping him in the seventh round, in what proved to be Doherty's final fight.

Doherty's went on to train his son Shaun, who followed in his footsteps and became a professional boxer.
