= Johnny Owen =

Welsh boxer (1956–1980)

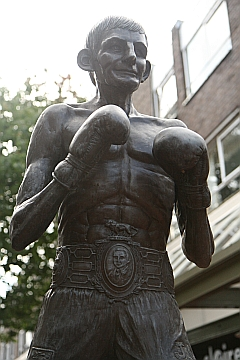
- Statue of Owen in Merthyr Tydfil

Personal information
- Nicknames: Merthyr Matchstick; The Matchstick Man; Bionic Bantam
- Born: John Richard Owens; 7 January 1956 Merthyr Tydfil, Wales
- Died: 4 November 1980 (aged 24) Los Angeles, California, US
- Height: 5 ft 8 in (173 cm)
- Weight: Bantamweight

Boxing career

Boxing record
- Total fights: 28
- Wins: 25
- Win by KO: 11
- Losses: 2
- Draws: 1

John Richard Owens (7 January 1956 – 4 November 1980) was a Welsh professional boxer who fought under the name Johnny Owen. His seemingly fragile appearance earned him many epithets, including the "Merthyr Matchstick" and the "Bionic Bantam". He began boxing at the age of eight and undertook a long amateur career, competing in more than 120 fights and representing Wales in competitions. He turned professional in September 1976 at the age of 20, winning his debut bout against George Sutton. Owen beat Sutton again in his sixth professional fight to win his first title, the vacant bantamweight title in the Welsh Area.

Owen challenged for the British bantamweight title in his tenth professional fight in 1977. He defeated champion Paddy Maguire in the eleventh round to win the title, becoming the first Welshman in more than 60 years to hold the belt. Owen recorded five further victories, including a defence of his British title against Wayne Evans, before meeting Paul Ferreri for the Commonwealth bantamweight title. He defeated the experienced Australian on points to claim the Commonwealth title and challenged Juan Francisco Rodríguez for the European title four months later. The fight in Almería, Spain, was shrouded in controversy and Owen suffered his first defeat in a highly contentious decision.

Owen went on to win seven consecutive bouts within a year to rechallenge Rodríguez in February 1980. He avenged his earlier defeat by beating Rodríguez on points to win the European title. He challenged World Boxing Council (WBC) champion Lupe Pintor for his world bantamweight title on 19 September 1980, losing the contest by way of a twelfth round knockout after being knocked down for the third time. Owen left the ring on a stretcher and never regained consciousness. He fell into a coma and died six weeks later in a Los Angeles hospital at the age of 24.

Owen possessed a professional career record of 25 wins (11 by knockout), 1 draw and 2 defeats. His only career losses came against Rodríguez and Pintor. He remains revered in the South Wales Valleys where he was raised, particularly in his hometown of Merthyr Tydfil where a statue commemorating his life and career was unveiled in 2002.

== Early life ==
Johnny Owen was born John Richard Owens at Gwaunfarren Hospital in Merthyr Tydfil on 7 January 1956, the fourth of eight children to working-class parents Dick and Edith Owens (née Hale). He had four brothers, Phillip, Vivian, Kelvin and Dilwyn, and three sisters, Marilyn, Susan and Shereen. The Owens family hailed from Llanidloes but moved south, settling in the village of Penwaunfawr, on the outskirts of Merthyr Tydfil. His paternal grandmother worked in the local mines while his grandfather Will worked in an ironworks and was an amateur boxer. His mother was born in Merthyr Tydfil, although her family hailed from Lydney in Gloucestershire, where her father had worked as a farmer. His mother's side of the family were of Irish ancestry. Both sets of Owen's ancestors had moved to the South Wales Valleys in search of work with increased steel, iron and coal production attracting workers from all over Britain. Owen's parents settled in a rented council house in Heol Bryn Selu on Gellideg housing estate in Merthyr.

In his 2006 biography of Owen, Rick Broadbent described an adolescent Owen as "a sensitive, quiet soul, he was deeply in tune with the moods and needs of those close to him." Owen attended the local school, Gellideg Juniors. A mild-mannered child, he was described by his teachers as a "quiet, hardworking, and very good-natured and well-behaved pupil". By the age of seven, he was doing the family's weekly shop and his father later recalled that, when the family was infected by a flu virus, Owen "fed us soup and made sure we all had our medicine. He looked after us." Owen's father worked as a miner for 13 years but eventually secured a job as a moulder at a boot-making factory owned by Dunlop. His wife had suffered complications during the birth of the couple's seventh child and her health deteriorated so much that she was hospitalised for an extended period. Owen's father nearly placed his children into care to continue working but reversed his decision after receiving assurances that he would not lose his job.

== Amateur career ==
Owen began to box at the age of eight, idolising fellow Merthyr-born boxer Jimmy Wilde. Along with his siblings Vivian and Kelvin, in the spring of 1962, he joined the Merthyr Amateur Boxing Club housed in a small hut on nearby Plymouth Street. Broadbent describes how, by age ten, Owen developed "some rudimentary ring craft and already had the boundless energy that would be his signature ... His punches were light but his effort huge." Owen and the other members of his club travelled the country, competing against youth clubs from Wales and England. Each year culminated in the Welsh amateur championships, a junior event which stipulated that a fighter must have gained 7 pounds (3.2 kg) each year they entered. Martyn Galleozzie, who trained alongside Owen, noted how Owen struggled to achieve the weight increase each year and was fed cakes and biscuits on the journey to try and make weight. Galleozzie also stated how his mother once sewed lead into the lining of Owen's shorts to make weight.

Owen joined Hoover Amateur Boxing Club soon after, where he trained with Idris Sutton and modelled his fighting style on Eddie Thomas. Owen was a quiet, reserved, friendly character outside the ring and often needed to be coaxed into fighting full force. In his youth, he suffered a loss to future WBC flyweight champion Charlie Magri in a bout in Gurnos. Owen attended Georgetown Secondary Modern School until the age of 16 when he left to take up a role as a machine operator in a local Suko nuts and bolts manufacturing factory. His exertions in the factory, coupled with his frequent runs in the hills of the South Wales Valleys with his brother Kelvin, led Owen to develop renowned levels of speed and stamina. His job however caused him health issues as the swarf from the factory led to Owen developing infections on occasion. A septic finger injury led to a lacklustre defeat to George Sutton in the 1975 Welsh Amateur Boxing Association (ABA) Championships after Owen refused to pull out of the fight.

In November 1973, Owen was invited to fight Welsh amateur champion Bryn Griffiths after his opponent had fallen ill and pulled out of a bout. Despite the short notice, Owen was confident of his ability to make the step up against Griffiths and was proved right when he recorded a points victory over the champion. Griffiths later won a rematch between the pair. At the age of 18, Owen met Maurice O'Sullivan for the 1974 Welsh ABA youth title in O'Sullivan's hometown of Cardiff after reaching the final of the tournament on 4 April. Despite Owen and his father being convinced of his victory, the judges awarded the fight to O'Sullivan who himself offered the trophy to Owen, although he refused to accept it. Owen's father Dick later stated that an official from the Welsh ABA approached him after the fight and confessed how the organisation had been under pressure to ensure O'Sullivan's victory in order for him to be selected for the 1974 British Commonwealth Games in New Zealand. Owen's father was becoming an increasing influence on his son's training especially when the two trainers at Owen's gym began suffering ill-health. When Dick was unable to take training, Owen would run the sessions at the gym for local fighters.

Owen represented Wales at amateur level several times; his performance in a 1974 tournament between Wales and Scotland drew praise in the local press. After defeating John Raeside in the second round during their bout in Pontypool, he was described as reducing his opponent "to helplessness with a non-stop two-fisted assault" and was chosen as the most impressive fighter in the two teams on the night. Owen became well known for his seemingly small, thin frame as he grew older; he was chosen to represent Wales in a contest against Sweden in February 1975 and was greeted with jeers and laughter when he removed his robe. The nickname "Matchstick Man" was coined at the event as Owen comfortably stopped his opponent in the second round. Having initially boxed as a featherweight, Owen began fighting in the heavier bantamweight class soon after and won his first bout at the weight against Englishman Allan Smith of the Metropolitan Police Amateur Boxing Club. His physique attracted further attention in November 1975; while representing Wales against an army team, a doctor initially refused to pass him fit to fight believing him to be too frail to box. After his father intervened, the fight went ahead and Owen won on points.

Owen enjoyed a lengthy amateur boxing career, taking in some 124 fights. He won 106 bouts in his amateur career, losing the remaining 18. He represented Wales at amateur level 19 times, suffering defeat on only two occasions. One of his victories came over 1974 Commonwealth Games bronze medallist John Bambrick. His amateur career ended on two disappointing notes; he suffered defeat in his Welsh senior amateur title fight against Jimmy Evans before losing his last amateur fight against Paul Chance.

== Professional career ==
=== Early fights and Welsh bantamweight title ===
Owen turned professional on 1 September 1976, signing with New Tredegar-based manager Dai Gardiner along with another fighter, Billy Vivian. The decision to turn professional prompted a change of name; Owen had been fighting under his given name as an amateur but was advised by his new management that a ring name would benefit his career. Owen's initial suggestion was Sion Rhisart Owain, the Welsh translation of his given name, although he was dissuaded from this option as it was deemed too political. His brother Kelvin instead suggested adopting the name Johnny Owen. Owen's initial aspirations were low, Kelvin stated how Owen had turned professional with the ultimate aim of claiming a British title or a Lonsdale Belt. Nonetheless, Owen was driven to turn professional by a desire to support his family and escape his relatively poor upbringing. One of his former youth coaches stated his belief that Owen understood he could "fight and make money for his family. He wanted to buy them a house but, really, ... the reason he boxed was because he had to."

His debut match ended with a one-point victory over fellow Welshman George Sutton, at Pontypool Leisure Centre, on 30 September; at the time, Sutton was ranked as the number three contender for the British title and had needed a challenger on short notice. His victory earned him his first professional purse of £125 (around £920 in 2021). The decision to fight an already established opponent proved astute as victory immediately saw Owen's standing rise in the boxing community. After his debut bout, Owen and his team agreed that he would not date during his professional career, with Owen believing that the dedication required to his career would be unfair on both him and his partner. His second fight was against Northern Irishman Neil McLaughlin in his opponent's home nation during the height of The Troubles. The card suffered several interruptions: there were angry outbursts when British soldiers entered the arena, a bomb threat was phoned in against the site and, during Owen's bout, the lights failed for several minutes. The fight ended in a controversial draw. Owen finished his first year as a professional by comfortably defeating Englishman Ian Murray in Tonypandy. He knocked Murray down twice before the referee stopped the fight in the seventh round.

At the start of the following year, Owen met McLaughlin in a rematch in West Bromwich. Away from his opponent's home nation, the fight proved a more one-sided affair as Owen secured an 80–76 points victory. This led promoter Heddwyn Taylor to raise the idea of Owen challenging reigning champion George Sutton for the Welsh bantamweight title. Although Owen had already beaten Sutton as a professional, the request was denied by the Welsh Area Boxing Council who deemed that he was too inexperienced. Unable to challenge for the title, Owen's promoters found themselves in need of an opponent and could only secure another rematch with McLaughlin. Even though Owen and his trainers voiced their displeasure over the bout, he went on to defeat McLaughlin for a second time in February. The Welsh Area Boxing Council reconsidered its decision and allowed a title fight between Owen and Sutton to go ahead on 29 March, with the bout regarded as an eliminator for the British title. The fight was an even contest in the early rounds until Owen rocked Sutton in the fifth with a right hook. Owen's stamina gave him a distinct advantage as the fight wore on and he emerged victorious with a 99–97 points victory to become Welsh bantamweight champion. It was from his Welsh title win that Owen gained another of his nicknames, the "Bionic Bantam", after a reporter for the Western Mail likened him to Steve Austin from The Six Million Dollar Man.

=== British bantamweight title ===
Owen's championship win resulted in him becoming a possible challenger for the British bantamweight champion Paddy Maguire. To move into contention, Owen was booked to fight Scottish bantamweight champion Johnny Kellie at the Albany Hotel in Glasgow. It was widely believed that the winner would be booked as Maguire's next opponent. During the fight Owen became infuriated with Kellie's tactics as his opponent relied on holding to waste time, when Owen was gaining the advantage, and he believed the referee was not penalising Kellie for it. Further issues were raised when Owen lost his gumshield and the referee forced him to continue without it. Owen was spurred on by these irritations and knocked Kellie down twice in quick succession before the referee stopped the fight in the sixth round. When the offer of a British title fight with Maguire failed to materialise, Owen instead fought debutant fighter Terry Hanna at Ebbw Vale Leisure Centre in June 1977, defeating him with a fourth-round knockout. Further disappointment followed as Maguire took a fight against Franco Zurlo in September of the same year, leaving Owen with an offer of a second rematch against George Sutton on only three days' notice. The fight took place at Midland Social Club in Solihull and Sutton proved a sterner test than most had anticipated in the early rounds, landing a strong punch to Owen's jaw that wobbled him. Owen was able to recover and won the fight on points.

Despite Owen's victories, it still seemed likely that he would be forced to wait for a match with Maguire. However, when the official challenger Wayne Evans declined the opportunity to fight Maguire, stating that he needed more experience, Owen stepped in and the fight was scheduled for November 1977 at the National Sporting Club in London. Maguire was entering the fight on a three-fight losing streak, having suffered defeats to Heleno Ferreira and Alberto Sandoval before unsuccessfully challenging Zurlo for the European bantamweight championship, and Owen was expected to be a serious threat to the Irishman's two-year reign. Owen edged the early rounds of the fight as his longer reach caused Maguire problems and the champion was warned on more than one occasion for use of the head and low blows. Already ahead on points, Owen dominated the eighth round and nearly knocked down Maguire. Such was Owen's dominance, Maguire's promoter Mickey Duff threatened to end the fight. The champion rallied in the ninth round but the referee stopped the fight in the eleventh after Owen had opened a large cut above Maguire's eye. In only his tenth professional bout, Owen was crowned the British bantamweight champion at the age of 21, becoming the first Welsh fighter to hold the title since Bill Beynon in 1913. He was awarded the belt by Prince Henry, Duke of Gloucester, while Maguire subsequently announced his retirement from boxing.

Owen's victory brought him a new found level of fame to which the young fighter was unaccustomed. On his return to Merthyr the day after the fight, he met with the town's mayor and two parties were held in his honour in local clubs. He was named Welsh Boxer of the Year for 1977 and finished fourth in voting for the 1977 BBC Wales Sports Personality of the Year. Owen returned to the ring in January 1978 in a non-title fight against Scottish boxer Alan Oag, defeating his opponent in the eighth round. A month later, Owen fought Antonio Medina at Marton Country Club near Newcastle and was surprised early on when his opponent emerged as a southpaw, the first time he had faced a fighter using the stance in his career. Owen's team had neglected to research their opponent ahead of the bout and the initial surprise caught Owen off-guard. Even so, he emerged victorious on points.

Owen's first defence of his British title was booked for 6 April 1978 at Ebbw Vale Leisure Centre against fellow Welshman Wayne Evans. The two fighters possessed near identical records; both entered the bout 11–0 with Owen also recording a draw. The fight was eagerly anticipated as it was both the first time the British bantamweight title had been contested in Wales and the first time it had featured two Welsh fighters. Owen was the stronger of the pair in the opening four rounds and Evans was hampered by a knuckle injury that had plagued his career. In the fifth round, Evans caught Owen with a punch that ruptured his eardrum and caused bleeding from the ear. Despite being almost unable to hear on one side, Owen took control of the fight after the fifth round and wore Evans down, eventually knocking him down in the ninth. Evans made it back to his feet for the end of the round but the start of the tenth saw Owen continue his assault, stopping Evans early in the round to successfully defend his title.

=== Commonwealth bantamweight title ===
In June 1978 Owen fought twice, defeating Dave Smith on points at the National Sporting Club before stopping Davy Larmour in the seventh round of a fight at the Double Diamond Club in Caerphilly two weeks later. The possibility of Owen competing for either the Commonwealth or European bantamweight titles was being raised and he received an offer of between £2000–2500 to fight the reigning Commonwealth champion, Ghanaian Sulley Shittu, in his opponent's home country. Shittu, however, was stripped of the title by the Commonwealth Championship Committee soon after having failed to meet a challenger in the required time. Australian Paul Ferreri, who had lost the belt to Shittu in January 1977, stated his willingness to contest the vacant Commonwealth title with Owen, offering the Welshman £4,000, on the stipulation that the fight be held in his home country. Owen rejected the offer over the distance and fears that partisan Australian judges could make the fight unwinnable. He instead met Englishman Wally Angliss, stopping him in the third round after Angliss had suffered a deep cut above his left eye.

Eager for the fight to go ahead, Ferreri dropped his request for the fight to be based in Australia and accepted a bout with Owen in Ebbw Vale on 2 November 1978. Ferreri was described by The Times as "world class opposition, such as Owen has never faced before." A former holder of the Commonwealth title, he entered the fight with nearly 70 professional bouts to Owen's 16 and had never been beaten by a British fighter. Ferreri proved a stern test for Owen, with his counter-punching style causing the Welshman problems in the opening rounds. By the eleventh round of the fifteen-round contest, The Times judged the fight to be "fascinatingly poised" but Owen's renowned stamina and the eight-year age gap proved telling as he was described as "covering the last four rounds of the fight like a sprinter". The referee awarded the fight 148–145 in Owen's favour and both fighters received plaudits from the capacity crowd; Ferreri was given a standing ovation by the largely Welsh crowd and Owen was carried to the dressing room on the shoulders of his team in celebration. Both Owen and the fight received several plaudits in annual award ceremonies, including Owen being named Best Young Fighter by the Boxing Writers' Club, becoming only the third Welshman after Howard Winstone and Dai Dower to receive the award. Owen was also named BBC Wales Sports Personality of the Year for 1978, becoming the first boxer to win the award since Winstone more than a decade earlier.

=== European bantamweight title challenge ===
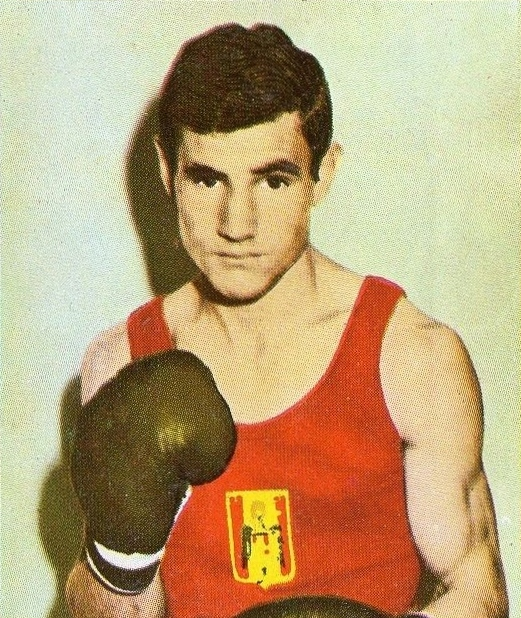
Juan Francisco Rodríguez, whom Owen fought twice for the European bantamweight title

Owen's victory led him to challenge for the division's European title, held by Juan Francisco Rodríguez of Spain. The fight was originally scheduled for the end of 1978 but Rodríguez withdrew from the bout due to a case of flu, and it was rearranged for three months later. It was Owen's eighteenth contest and his first overseas, taking place in the champion's hometown of Almería. The fight was preceded by a series of allegations of foul play by Owen's camp. He was promised the use of the same training facilities as the champion in the afternoons, once Rodríguez had finished his sessions. In practice, however, Owen and his team often found themselves waiting at the gym for Rodríguez to finish his training, taking up hours of Owen's sessions. At the weigh-in, Owen was marginally overweight, prompting a last minute training session involving running up and down the hotel stairs until he hit the 118 pounds (54 kg) limit. Rodríguez also exceeded the weight limit by a larger margin, more than could be lost in the allowed time. Owen and his team returned to the hotel with the intent of returning to Britain, believing the fight would be called off. However, Owen's manager Dai Gardiner returned to announce that the Spanish officials had passed Rodríguez fit to fight despite having weighed in 3 ounces (85 g) overweight. Owen decided to go ahead with the bout, eager not to return to Britain empty-handed. Gardiner also held concerns over local judges heading into the fight and predicted that, in order to win, Owen would have to stop his opponent.

The fight was held in the town's bullring in front of a capacity crowd and Owen entered the arena to loud jeers. The first round was relatively uneventful as both fighters settled. When Owen returned to his corner, his father was infuriated after smelling wintergreen oil on Owen. Believing the substance came from Rodríguez's gloves, he approached the referee who ignored Dick Owens' complaints. The British Boxing Board of Control's (BBBofC) representative at the fight, Harry Vines, attempted to approach Owen's team to find out what was causing commotion and found himself being pushed and shoved by members of the crowd before Spanish police ordered him to return to his seat. Rodríguez used several underhand manoeuvres against Owen, including illegal use of the head and elbows and attempted to screw his thumb into Owen's eye, eventually receiving an official warning from the referee in the twelfth round after being reprimanded on several occasions. At the start of the tenth round, Owen returned to the middle of the ring but was forced to wait as Rodríguez took several extra minutes to leave his corner before standing to taunt his opponent in front of the home crowd. Rodríguez was awarded the victory on points in a decision that Steve Bunce later declared: "In what has been regarded as a 'home-town decision travesty', Rodríguez was awarded a fight he had so obviously lost." The Dictionary of Welsh Biography went further and described the decision as "an insult to the good name of boxing".

Owen and his team returned to Wales despondent and infuriated. Their ire was further increased when the Spanish Boxing Federation withheld £1,200 from Owen's fee in retaliation for an incident the previous year when a Spanish boxer had been deducted pay for retiring from a fight in Britain. The Welsh Area Boxing Council held an investigation into the fight, during which Vines described the incident as "the worst decision he'd ever experienced". However, the council had no power over Spanish promoters and there was no alternative for Owen other than to accept the loss, although the BBBofC did refund Owen the money that had been deducted from his paycheck. Gardiner arranged a high-profile bout with American Jose Gonzalez in an attempt to immediately showcase Owen internationally again but the fight was postponed when Gonzalez failed to make weight. With Owen ready to fight, Lee Graham was named as a late replacement but was little match for Owen who won on points. A more experienced opponent was arranged a month later, Frenchman Guy Caudron who had won 35 of his 49 career fights proved more of a test for Owen. Caudron lasted 12 rounds but was defeated 99–97 on points. Despite having fought in 19 professional bouts, it was only after the Caudron fight that Owen left his job at the Suko factory as his boxing schedule became too hectic to continue working. Owen made his first defence of his Commonwealth title and his third of his British title in June 1979 against Dave Smith, an opponent he had beaten the previous year, at the Double Diamond Club in Caerphilly. Owen was eager to impress in the fight as victory would also see him achieve a lifelong ambition of retaining a Lonsdale Belt, which became the permanent property of a fighter once they had completed three successful defences. From the first round he dominated Smith, whose trainer eventually threw in the towel during the twelfth round. By now, Owen had set his sights on a rematch with Rodríguez for the European title. He met Neil McLaughlin for a fourth time on 17 September 1979 at the Albany Hotel in Glasgow and recorded a comfortable 100–95 points victory to secure his 20th professional win.

A fight against American Isaac Vega was booked for 4 October of the same year. When Owen and his team arrived at Ebbw Vale Leisure Centre for the bout they found that Vega had pulled out of the contest without warning and the American promoters instead offered a replacement, Jose Garcia. Owen's camp knew nothing of the new opponent but went along with the change to provide Owen with much needed competition. Garcia had only fought professionally once before, losing by knockout in the first round more than a year before. Garcia provided little competition for Owen with the referee stopping the fight in the fifth round.

=== Rematch with Rodríguez ===
Owen ended 1979 with one further victory over American David Vasquez, a fighter who had unsuccessfully challenged world champion Lupe Pintor a year earlier and had been in line to meet Wilfredo Gómez. Although he provided a challenge for Owen, Vasquez ultimately lost to the Welshman on points. The victory put Owen in contention for a rematch against Rodríguez and the fight was confirmed at the start of 1980, due for the early months of the year. Two weeks later Owen fought fellow Welshman Glyn Davies at the National Sporting Club. Davies was described as a "tough old pro" who had fought over 40 times professionally but he lasted only five rounds before the referee stopped the fight in Owen's favour. After the bout, Davies remarked: "I have been beaten by the next world champion." Owen decided to invest some of his earnings by purchasing a shop on Galon Uchaf housing estate in his hometown of Merthyr.

Owen and his camp were enthusiastic when their promoter offered them a rematch with Rodríguez for the European title. Rodríguez was short of competitors willing to fight in his home country and was forced to accept the Ebbw Vale Leisure Centre to secure a large prize fund. The venue was filled to capacity, with more than 1,800 spectators. The fight started slowly and Rodríguez restricted the early pace of the opening rounds by holding Owen on the blindside of the referee. Rodríguez continued a defensive, counter-punching style and caught Owen several times as the Welshman continually advanced, attempting to push the pace between the fifth and eighth rounds. Owen did cause damage to his opponent after trapping him on the ropes during the sixth. As Rodríguez tired, Owen continued his pattern of pressing him around the ring and controlled the remaining rounds of the fight. The three judges awarded Owen a unanimous victory to crown him European bantamweight champion.

=== Final bout ===
With Owen the European champion, a fight against the WBC title holder, Mexican Lupe Pintor, was reported to be under consideration. However, Owen's next fight was confirmed as a British and Commonwealth title defence against Englishman John Feeney at Empire Pool in London. Owen did not consider Feeney at the same level as Ferreri or Rodríguez, but with an 18–0 record, Feeney was an upcoming prospect in British boxing. Feeney started spritely in the opening rounds but Owen's relentless pressure wore down the opposition fighter and he emerged victorious with a comfortable win on points. In its report of the fight, The Times described fighting Owen as like "trying to beat a carpet, so resilient is he ... the carpet ends up by giving you a dusting."

Ranked as the number four bantamweight in the world by the WBC, Owen was offered a lucrative title fight against Pintor by promoter Mickey Duff. The two parties had discussed a potential meeting in Wales, an option to which Pintor was open, but promoters in the country could not match the purse offered by American promoters and the fight was held in Los Angeles. Owen stated that, should he win the fight, his plan was to defend the belt three times before retiring to Merthyr. Pintor had edged a highly controversial split decision over stablemate and long-time champion Carlos Zárate to win his world bantamweight title in June 1978. Zárate retired in disgust following the decision, but Pintor proved to be an able successor and had defended his title twice heading into the fight. Owen arrived in Los Angeles a week before the fight to acclimatise to the humidity. Both Owen and Pintor would go for early morning runs in the local area and would sometimes pass in a nearby park without acknowledging each other. Both fighters trained at the gym facilities in the Los Angeles Memorial Sports Arena. Owen found the press intrusion from the Mexican reporters difficult to deal with; he was hounded everywhere during the day and his motel room phone rang so often that Dai Gardiner requested the motel block any incoming calls. Eventually, Owen snapped and threatened to disrupt the fight schedule unless action was taken. The fight promoter promptly intervened and the press backed off.

The bout was held at the Grand Olympic Auditorium, Los Angeles, on 19 September 1980. The arena had a capacity of 10,000 but estimates have put the crowd at well beyond that. The crowd was predominantly Mexican, with Pintor receiving fervent support. While some Welsh fans had travelled to support Owen they were said to be "outnumbered 100 to 1 at least". Owen was considered the underdog with odds on his victory being offered at 6–1 before the fight, but he surprised many in the opening round by actively pursuing Pintor around the ring, seeking to engage with the champion. His pressure was rewarded in the third and fourth rounds, both of which he won on most observers' scorecards, although Pintor responded with some strong right hands. Pintor began to realise that Owen was a considerable threat, perhaps more than he had anticipated, and responded in the fourth by landing a strong shot to Owen, although the Welshman quickly shook it off. In the fifth round, Owen suffered a large cut to the inside of his bottom lip that began to bleed profusely, leaving him swallowing blood for the remainder of the fight. The ringside doctor and the referee inspected the cut but deemed Owen was fit to continue.

Pintor looked to take control of the fight and was the stronger through rounds six to eight, although he did receive cuts to both eyes. By this stage in the fight most observers judged the fight to be evenly poised, with some even giving Owen a slight lead. Pintor began to fight more aggressively in the ninth round and his approach paid off when he caught Owen with a punch that knocked the Welshman down for the first time in his professional career. Owen got to his feet quickly and assured the referee that he was fine but the momentum of the fight moved in the champion's direction and from the tenth round Pintor was in the ascendency. An exhausted Owen battled on through the eleventh round and referee Marty Denkin approached Owen's corner to end the fight but was told he was fine to continue. Owen returned for the twelfth and was knocked down a second time but again got to his feet. With 25 seconds remaining in the round, Pintor caught Owen with a strong right hand to the head and Owen crumpled to the floor. The referee immediately called an end to the fight rather than count Owen out, stating he had seen Owen's pupils go up into his head, indicating he was unconscious before he fell to the floor. Owen suffered convulsions in the ring as doctors treated him and blood poured from his mouth. The crowd showed little sympathy for Owen's condition; beer and other debris were thrown into the ring and Owen's corner men were shoved and pushed as they attempted to aid their fighter. Ken Bryant, a member of Owen's team, had his wallet pickpocketed from his coat as he attended to the stricken fighter. Owen was loaded onto a stretcher and carried out of the arena before being taken to California Hospital Medical Center. He was taken into surgery, where doctors removed a blood clot from his brain after a three-hour operation. The BBC regarded the knockout as so disturbing that it cancelled its replay broadcast of the fight in the UK and instead aired an edited highlights segment.

== Death ==
They came in their thousands. They braved the rain and chilling winds. Silent and patient, they awaited their turn to pay their respects to a fallen hero of the town of Tydfil the Martyr. They were the mourners who extended beyond the family, beyond the sporting world, beyond the town itself who were moved to grieve over the death of a brave young boxer.

— Extract from the Merthyr Express describing the day of Owen's funeral.

The hospital where Owen was treated received more than 100 calls and telegrams from well-wishers within the first 24 hours after the fight. Owen's mother arrived in the United States a day later. The neurosurgeon in charge of Owen revealed how they had discovered that Owen possessed both an unusually delicate skull and a strong jaw. As a result, Pintor's punch had inadvertently pushed Owen's jawbone through his skull and into his brain, causing irreparable damage. Owen underwent a second operation soon after to relieve pressure on his brain but soon contracted pneumonia. Once this had cleared, a third surgery was required but Owen remained unconscious. Although his doctor believed his condition was improving, a second bout of pneumonia on 4 November ultimately ended his life at 24 years old with his parents by his bedside.

Owen's body was returned to Wales where he was held in Merthyr Parish Church. The coffin was kept in a public area and thousands of visitors attended the church to pay tribute to Owen. His funeral ceremony was held at High Street Baptist Church. The church held around 1,000 people while around 4,000 waited outside where the ceremony was broadcast through loudspeakers. He was buried in Pant Cemetery in Merthyr on 11 November. Hundreds of floral tributes were sent on the day, including from Muhammad Ali and singer Tom Jones. The Secretary of State for Wales, Nicholas Edwards, sent a telegram to Owen's family in which he proclaimed "All Wales is saddened to hear of Johnny Owen's death". The Times reported that the entire town of Merthyr "closed" on the day of his funeral. Pintor was devastated by the death of Owen and contemplated retiring from boxing. The Owens family held no malice towards Pintor and absolved him of any blame for Owen's death. They sent him messages of support after the fight and encouraged the Mexican fighter to continue boxing.

The WBC claimed that Owen had been insured for $50,000, but this later proved to be false as the payments were capped at $25,000 that would first be put towards medical expenses. The cost of Owen's treatment was $94,000, more than three times the insurance payout. The remaining medical bills were paid by a public appeal that raised $128,000 for Owen, with his family donating the remaining money to charity. In his will, Owen left £45,189 to his family, having earned less than £7,000 for his title fight with Pintor after expenses. Owen's death, along with those of Kim Deuk-koo and Francisco Bejines in the early 1980s, ultimately led to boxing title fights being fought over 12 instead of 15 rounds in an attempt to improve the safety of fighters.

== Fighting style ==
Owen was renowned for his dedication to boxing, training relentlessly and often doing more work than his trainers asked of him. His dedication was such that he never drank alcohol and it is widely believed that he abstained from romantic relationships. This led to Hugh McIlvanney of The Observer labelling Owen as "The Virgin Soldier" in 1979. Owen's training involved running considerable distances, between 9 and 12 miles (14 and 19 km) on normal days, contributing to his thin physique. Owen's manager, Dai Gardiner, was accused of starving Owen to maintain his leanness and allow him to compete at bantamweight.

His stamina was regarded as inexhaustible; Winford Jones, a boxing writer and former referee, described Owen: "His great skill wasn't his strength – though he never took a backwards step and could punch as hard as anyone of his weight – it was his stamina. He could fight for hours, and would wear opponents down by outlasting them." Jones also stated that Owen's stamina made him an ideal fighter in the professional ranks where fights often went over ten rounds compared to his amateur career, where fights typically lasted three. His reliance on his ability to outlast fighters sometimes led to weak points during the early rounds of fights. Srikumar Sen of The Times noted "Owen is a slow starter and can be caught early".

Although he did not possess devastating knockout power, Owen was noted for his "fast accurate punching". Owen's punching power was often debated, with some doubting that he possessed the power required to become a world champion. Michael Katz of The New York Times wrote after his victory over John Feeney that "the guy (Owen) can't punch. If he could he would be illegal because he's got so much else." Owen was also praised for his sportsmanship towards other fighters. Idris Sutton, who trained Owen from an early age, described him as "a real gentleman. I never saw him throw a foul punch or do anything dirty ... If he saw his opponent slipping, he would stand back and give him a chance to get up. He ... would never look to take advantage of an accident. And if you beat him fair and square he'd be the first to shake your hand." Lupe Pintor later described his admiration of Owen, remarking that he "was very honorable because he had determination, not only the determination of winning but representing a society, his people, that's the greatest thing I admired about him, his will, his hunger, that's something that made him very special."

== Legacy ==
A year after his death, a pub in Merthyr named The Matchstick Man opened. The following year, a plaque was unveiled at Prince Charles Hospital after some of the money donated to charity by Owen's family had been given to the establishment. The Johnny Owen Courage Award and the Johnny Owen Carer's Award are presented annually at the hospital. A community centre, named the Johnny Owen Centre, was built on the Gurnos Estate in Merthyr shortly following his death in 1980. The building was demolished in 2018 after the owner, Merthyr Valley Homes, deemed it to be too costly to modernise. In 2002, a statue of Owen was erected in his hometown Merthyr at a cost of £40,000. His family attended the ceremony during which the statue was unveiled by Pintor, who travelled from his home country to attend. The same year, Dick Owens travelled to Mexico to meet with Pintor as part of the BBC Four documentary Johnny Owen: The Long Journey in which the two men met for the first time since 1980. The documentary won two BAFTA awards for best documentary drama and best direction in the Welsh production category.

Historian Martin Johnes has argued that Owen was an "emblematic figure who represented both the ideals of Welsh working-class communities and their suffering and courage in the face of adversity and tragedy". Johnes' research demonstrates how Owen's story was told and retold, with its meaning and relevance shifting in the postindustrial environment of Merthyr and South Wales. He noted that Owen's funeral resembled those of the victims of coal mining pit disasters which had frequented the area while the Western Mail described him as "the latest hero of a town scarred by bitter memories". In his published work on Owen, Johnes ends by stating that Owen "remains a heroic figure" in the South Wales Valleys.

== Professional boxing record ==
Professional boxing record
28 fights	25 wins	2 losses
By knockout	11	1
By decision	14	1
Draws	1	

No.	Result	Record	Opponent	Type	Round	Date	Location	Notes
28	Loss	25–2–1	Lupe Pintor	KO	12 (15)	19 Sep 1980	Grand Olympic Auditorium, Los Angeles, California, US	For WBC bantamweight title
27	Win	25–1–1	John Feeney	PTS	15	28 Jun 1980	Empire Pool, London, England	Retained British and Commonwealth bantamweight titles
26	Win	24–1–1	Juan Francisco Rodríguez	UD	12	28 Feb 1980	Leisure Centre, Ebbw Vale, Wales	Won European bantamweight title
25	Win	23–1–1	Glyn Davies	RTD	5 (8)	22 Jan 1980	National Sporting Club, London, England	
24	Win	22–1–1	David Vasquez	PTS	10	29 Nov 1979	Leisure Centre, Ebbw Vale, Wales	
23	Win	21–1–1	Jose Garcia	TKO	5 (10)	4 Oct 1979	Leisure Centre, Ebbw Vale, Wales	
22	Win	20–1–1	Neil McLaughlin	PTS	10	17 Sep 1979	Albany Hotel, Glasgow, Scotland	
21	Win	19–1–1	Dave Smith	TKO	12 (15)	13 Jun 1979	Double Diamond Club, Caerphilly, Wales	Retained British and Commonwealth bantamweight titles
20	Win	18–1–1	Guy Caudron	PTS	10	10 May 1979	Sports Centre, Pontypool, Wales	
19	Win	17–1–1	Lee Graham	PTS	8	19 Apr 1979	National Sporting Club, London, England	
18	Loss	16–1–1	Juan Francisco Rodríguez	MD	15	3 Mar 1979	Plaza de Toros, Almería, Spain	For European bantamweight title
17	Win	16–0–1	Paul Ferreri	PTS	15	2 Nov 1978	Leisure Centre, Ebbw Vale, Wales	Won vacant Commonwealth bantamweight title
16	Win	15–0–1	Wally Angliss	TKO	3 (10)	25 Sep 1978	National Sporting Club, London, England	
15	Win	14–0–1	Davy Larmour	TKO	7 (10)	29 Jun 1978	Double Diamond Club, Caerphilly, Wales	
14	Win	13–0–1	Dave Smith	PTS	8	12 Jun 1978	National Sporting Club, London, England	
13	Win	12–0–1	Wayne Evans	TKO	10 (15)	6 Apr 1978	Leisure Centre, Ebbw Vale, Wales	Retained British bantamweight title
12	Win	11–0–1	Antonio Medina	PTS	8	27 Feb 1978	Country Club, Marton, England	
11	Win	10–0–1	Alan Oag	TKO	8 (10)	23 Jan 1978	Afan Lido, Port Talbot, Wales	
10	Win	9–0–1	Paddy Maguire	TKO	11 (15)	29 Nov 1977	National Sporting Club, London, England	Won British bantamweight title
9	Win	8–0–1	George Sutton	PTS	8	21 Sep 1977	Midland Sporting Club, Solihull, England	
8	Win	7–0–1	Terry Hanna	TKO	4 (8)	16 Jun 1977	Leisure Centre, Ebbw Vale, Wales	
7	Win	6–0–1	John Kellie	TKO	6 (10)	25 Apr 1977	Albany Hotel, Glasgow, Scotland	
6	Win	5–0–1	George Sutton	PTS	10	29 Mar 1977	Leisure Centre, Ebbw Vale, Wales	Won vacant Welsh Area bantamweight title
5	Win	4–0–1	Neil McLaughlin	PTS	8	15 Feb 1977	Sports Centre, Merthyr Tydfil, Wales	
4	Win	3–0–1	Neil McLaughlin	PTS	8	28 Jan 1977	Gala Baths, West Bromwich, England	
3	Win	2–0–1	Ian Murray	TKO	7 (8)	23 Nov 1976	Rhondda Leisure Centre, Ystrad, Wales	
2	Draw	1–0–1	Neil McLaughlin	PTS	8	9 Nov 1976	Sports Complex, Templemore, Northern Ireland	
1	Win	1–0	George Sutton	PTS	8	30 Sep 1976	Sports Centre, Pontypool, Wales	

== See also ==
- List of British bantamweight boxing champions
- List of Commonwealth Boxing Council bantamweight champions
- List of European Boxing Union bantamweight champions
- List of Lonsdale Belt Winners

Sporting positions
Regional boxing titles
Vacant Title last held by Tony Davies	Welsh Area bantamweight champion 29 March 1977 – August 1977	Vacant Title next held by Glynne Davies
Preceded by Paddy Maguire	British bantamweight champion 29 November 1977 – August 1980; Vacated	Vacant Title next held by John Feeney
Vacant Title last held by Sulley Shittu	Commonwealth bantamweight champion 2 November 1978 – August 1980; Vacated	Vacant Title next held by Paul Ferreri
Preceded by Juan Francisco Rodríguez	European bantamweight champion 28 February 1980 – August 1980; Vacated	Vacant Title next held by Valerio Nati
