= Eric Cardouza =

British boxer

Personal information
- Born: 1 April 1968 (age 58) Lambeth, London, England

Sport
- Sport: Boxing
Medal record
Boxing
Representing England
Commonwealth Games
Bronze medal – third place	1986 Edinburgh	heavyweight

Eric Cardouza (born 1 April 1965) is a British retired boxer.

== Boxing career ==
He represented England and won a bronze medal in the 91 kg heavyweight division, at the 1986 Commonwealth Games in Edinburgh, Scotland.

Cardouza boxed for the Kingsthorpe ABC and won the ABA heavyweight championship in 1986.
