= Doug Young (boxer) =

British boxer

Personal information
- Full name: Douglas Young
- Born: 12 December 1961 (age 64) Jedburgh, Scotland

Sport
- Sport: Boxing
Medal record
Representing Scotland
Commonwealth Games
Silver medal – second place	1986 Edinburgh	Heavyweight

Douglas Young (born 12 December 1961) is a British boxer. He competed in the men's heavyweight event at the 1984 Summer Olympics. He represented Scotland at the 1986 Commonwealth Games where he won a silver medal in the heavyweight event.
