= Jimmy Flint =

British boxer

- Born: 6 November 1952 (age 73); Wapping, East London, England
- Occupations: Boxer, actor
- Years active: 1952–present

Jimmy "The Wapping Assassin" Flint (born 6 November 1952) is a British actor and retired boxer.

== Early life and boxing ==
Jimmy was born and brought up in Wapping, East London as the son of a docker. Jimmy started off his amateur boxing career in 1963 at the Broad Street Boxing Club in Stepney. He then went on to start his professional boxing career in 1973 as a Featherweight. In 1981, is final fight was the Final Eliminator for 'BBB of C' British Featherweight Title, at the Royal Albert Hall, Kensington, London, where he lost by knock out in the 4th round to Welshman Steve Simms. Following that fight, he retired in 1981; his record was Won 27 (17 by KO), drawn - 0, lost - 3.

== Acting career ==
After getting frustrated with boxing, Jimmy got involved in acting with the director Ron Peck in the film Empire State. With the success of the film, this prompted his passion for acting and writing. Shortly afterwards Jimmy wrote the one man play entitled 'The Wapping Assassin' after his own life story. He has subsequently appeared in major films such as The Krays and Guy Ritchie's Lock, Stock and Two Smoking Barrels and Revolver.

== Partial filmography ==
- The Bill (2010)
- Rise of the Footsoldier (2007)
- Revolver (2005)
- Messiah: The Promise (2004)
- Kavanagh QC (1999)
- Casualty (1999)
- Lock, Stock and Two Smoking Barrels (1998)
- Real Money (1996)
- Look at It This Way (1992)
- Uncle Vanya BBC (1991)
- Hands of a Murderer (1990)
- The Krays (1990)
- Fighters (1988)
- Empire State (1987)
