= Davy Larmour (boxer) =

Northern Irish boxer (born 1949)

Personal information
- Nationality: British/Irish
- Born: David Larmour; 2 April 1949 (age 77) Belfast, Northern Ireland
- Height: 5 ft 3 in (160 cm)
- Weight: Flyweight, bantamweight

Boxing career

Boxing record
- Total fights: 18
- Wins: 11
- Win by KO: 3
- Losses: 7
Medal record
Bronze medal – third place	1970 Commonwealth Games	(flyweight)
Gold medal – first place	1974 Commonwealth Games	(flyweight)

David Larmour (born 2 April 1949) is a former boxer from Northern Ireland who as an amateur won a Commonwealth Games gold medal in 1974 and competed at the 1976 Summer Olympics, and as a professional won the British bantamweight title in 1983.

== Amateur career ==
Born in the Shankill Road area of Belfast, Larmour boxed out of the Albert Foundry Boxing Club. He won a bronze medal at flyweight at the 1970 Commonwealth Games. After being beaten in the National Senior final in both 1971 and 1972 by Neil McLaughlin, he won the 1973 Irish flyweight championship with a win over Brendan Dunne. He went on to represent Ireland in November 1973 against Romania. In August 1974 he represented Ireland at the World Amateur Boxing Championships in Havana, Cuba, losing in the first round to eventual bronze medalist Constantin Gruiescu.

Larmour represented Northern Ireland at the 1974 British Commonwealth Games in Christchurch, beating Chandra Narayanan of India in the flyweight final to take the gold medal. He represented Ireland at the 1975 European Championships in Poland, reaching the flyweight quarter-final where he lost to Charlie Magri of Great Britain.

Larmour beat Tony Noonan in the Irish National Senior flyweight final in 1976, earning a place at the 1976 Summer Olympics in Montreal. With many African countries boycotting the games, Larmour got byes in the first two rounds, losing in the quarter final to eventual gold medalist Leo Randolph of the USA.

== Professional career ==
After the Montreal Olympics, Larmour made the decision to turn professional, making his pro debut in July 1977 with a first-round knockout of Jimmy Bott. He was stopped in his next two fights (by John Feeney and George Sutton) before beating Alan Oag (via disqualification) in May 1978. In June he was stopped in the seventh round by Johnny Owen.

In October 1978 he successfully challenged for Neil McLaughlin's BBBofC Northern Ireland Area bantamweight title, beating the defending champion on points. He won his next five fights before losing to Steve Sims on points in September 1980.

In March 1981 he faced Dave Smith in a final eliminator for the British title, but lost by a single point. After beating Ivor Jones in April 1982 he faced Hugh Russell in October in another British title final eliminator, with the Northern Ireland Area title and the Irish title also at stake. Larmour again lost by a single point over the twelve rounds.

After Russell had taken the British title from Feeney, in March 1983 his first defence was against Larmour. This time, having put Russell down in the fifth round, Larmour took the decision to become British and Northern Ireland Area bantamweight champion. Larmour made one defence of the title, losing it to Feeney in November 1983. He subsequently retired from boxing.

== Legacy ==
Larmour has participated in talks to schoolchildren in Northern Ireland, discussing his career and how boxing can help break down sectarian divisions. He is commemorated, along with Jimmy Warnock and Tommy Armour, on the 'Shankill Road Boxing' mural on Hopewell Crescent in his native area of Belfast.
