= Alec Mullen =

Scottish boxer

Personal information
- Born: 8 February 1966 (age 60) Irvine, Ayrshire, Scotland

Sport
- Sport: Boxing
Medal record
Representing Scotland
Commonwealth Games
Bronze medal – third place	1986 Edinburgh	Light middleweight

Alexander Aitken "Alec" Mullen Mullen is a Scottish former boxer.

Fighting out of his home village of Springside boxing club along with brothers John 1965–2017, Boyd, and Joe born 1969–1999, cousin Harry and coached by his father John Mullen 1944-2019 competed in over 120 amateur contests, winning 105.

He was national schoolboy champion in 1981 Assembly Rooms Derby (intermediate class 60 kilograms (130 lb)), followed by Gaelic gold 69 kilograms (152 lb) in Cardiff in 1983. Mullen added 3 Scottish light middleweight titles, in 1984, 1985, and 1986, to the 4 Scottish youth titles he won 1980, 1981, 1982, and 1983. He also represented his country at European junior championships (Helsinki, Finland 1984), European senior championships (Budapest, Hungary 1985). He ended his amateur career with a bronze medal at light middleweight at the 1986 Commonwealth Games in Edinburgh. Mullen also represented his country 18 times, winning 15. The highlight of his career was beating Rod Douglas, Great Britain's representative at the Los Angeles Olympics of 1984, at Dundee in a televised international Scotland V England on 17 January 1985.

Mullen turned professional in October 1986, competing as a middleweight and winning 6 fights out of 6; his last fight was a points win versus Peter Brown at Solihull in May 1987.
