= Neil Haddock =

Wales boxer

Personal information
- Born: Neil Haddock; 22 June 1964 (age 62) Newport, Wales
- Height: 5 ft 6 in (168 cm)
- Weight: lightweight super featherweight

Boxing career

Boxing record
- Total fights: 26
- Wins: 20
- Win by KO: 6
- Losses: 5
- Draws: 1
- No contests: 0

Neil Haddock
Medal record
Men's Boxing
Representing Wales
Commonwealth Games
Silver medal – second place	1986 Edinburgh	Lightweight

Neil Haddock (born 22 June 1964) is a Welsh former lightweight and super featherweight boxer. Before turning professional he won a silver medal as a lightweight at the 1986 Commonwealth Games. His early career as a professional lightweight was not very notable, but after a year out from boxing caused by an eye injury, he returned fitter and lighter as a super featherweight. In 1992 he became the Welsh super featherweight champion, taking the British title just five months later. He retired from boxing in 1994.

== Boxing career ==
=== Featherweight ===
Born in Newport, but growing up in Llanelli, Haddock was involved in boxing from a young age and was Welsh Junior Champion at the age of 17. He came to note to the wider public when, as an amateur, he was selected to represent the Welsh team at the 1986 Commonwealth Games in Edinburgh, Scotland, after beating Tony Feliciello in the Welsh National Championships. Fighting in the lightweight division (60 kg), Haddock progressed to the final, where he took the silver medal after losing to Canadian Asif Dar.

Haddock turned professional within the year, with his first encounter, against Mark Purcell, taking place at the Hatherley Manor Hotel in Gloucester. It was an inauspicious start to his career, losing on points in a six-round contest after being downed in the third. Haddock fought regularly throughout 1987 and 1988, but found it difficult to build a winning run of results, with five wins, seven losses and a draw. He fought just once in 1989, a win over Lee Amass on 22 March.

Haddock's next fight, on 18 September 1990, saw him on the undercard for the British super-featherweight title fight between Hugh Forde and Joey Jacobs, held at the Civic Hall in Wolverhampton. His opponent was future WBF super-featherweight champion, Ditau Molefyane. The ten round fight lasted only until the fifth when Haddock retired from his corner after being knocked down earlier in the round.

A month later Haddock picked up a win, when he stopped Mark Ramsey through a technical knockout, in an undercard encounter at the Town Hall in Birmingham. This was followed in November with a bout against fellow countryman Steve Robinson, held in Cardiff. The ten round fight lasted until the ninth, when the referee stopped the fight due to cuts sustained by Haddock.

=== Super-featherweight ===
Haddock was forced to retire from boxing for a period due to a retina injury. During his time away from boxing, Haddock had dropped in weight, and was now fighting at super-featherweight. The new weight suited Haddock, which saw him enter the most successful period of his professional career. Haddock's first two opponents at his new weight were Barrie Kelley and Andy DeAbreu, both of whom would hold the Wales super-featherweight title during their careers. Haddock defeated Kelley in a six-round bout by points, exactly a year and a day after his loss to Robinson at the same venue, the Star Leisure Centre in Cardiff. A month later, 17 December 1991, he faced DeAbreu and stopped his opponent via technical knockout in the third.

His next fight was a re-match with Robinson, for the vacant Wales area super-lightweight title. Held at the Bull Centre in Haddock's home town of Llanelli, the ten-round fight went the distance with Haddock winning the match on points, giving Haddock his first professional title. The win entitled Haddock to challenge for the British title, held by Michael Armstrong. The fight was given top billing, and was held at Bury on 13 October 1992. The 12-round match only lasted until the sixth when Haddock stopped his opponent via a technical knockout, giving him the British super-featherweight title.

At the end of 1992, Haddock beat Harry Escott, before successfully defending his British title against Steve Walker in July 1993, another technical knockout, this time in round seven. His final career win was against future Welsh super featherweight champion John T. Williams. Fought at the Cardiff Arms Park, the match was the main undercard bout for the Lennox Lewis vs. Frank Bruno encounter. His first defeat at super-featherweight came on 23 March 1994, in a title challenge for his British belt. Fought in Cardiff, his opponent was Floyd Havard, a fighter from Swansea who had already held the title between 1988 and 1989. Scheduled for 12 rounds, the match only reached the tenth, with Havard beating Haddock by technical knockout. Haddock fought just once more, a challenge for the EBU super-featherweight title, held in Cayenne, French Guiana against Jacobin Yoma. This was Haddock's first match outside Britain, and he struggled with the climate, losing the fight in the sixth. He retired from boxing soon after.

Haddock is one of only four Welshmen to have won the British super-featherweight title, alongside Robert Dickie, Floyd Harvard and Gary Buckland.
