= Joey Jacobs (boxer, born 1960) =

British boxer

Personal information
- Nationality: British
- Born: Joseph Jacobs; 1 October 1960 (age 65) Manchester, England
- Height: 5 ft 8 in (173 cm)
- Weight: Lightweight; Super featherweight

Boxing career

Boxing record
- Total fights: 15
- Wins: 10
- Win by KO: 2
- Losses: 5
Medal record
Boxing
Representing England
British Empire & Commonwealth Games
Bronze medal – third place	1986 Edinburgh	-60 kg

Joseph Jacobs (born 1 October 1960) is a British former boxer who as an amateur was ABA lightweight champion in 1986, and as a professional was British super featherweight champion in 1990, going on to fight for a world title.

== Career ==
Born in Manchester, Jacobs boxed out of the Fox ABC in Ancoats as an amateur, and won the ABA lightweight (60 kg) championship in 1986.

He represented England and won a bronze medal in the -60 Kg division at the 1986 Commonwealth Games in Edinburgh, Scotland following in the footsteps of his father Joey Jacobs Sr.

He made his professional debut in October 1986, beating Tony Richards on points. After winning his first five fights, including a points win over Sugar Gibiliru, he suffered his first defeat in March 1987 when he was stopped in the first round by George Baigrie.

In September 1987 he beat Carl Crook on points to take the BBBofC Central Area lightweight title. In November 1988 he challenged for the British lightweight title held by Steve Boyle, the defending champion stopping him in the eighth round.

He dropped down to super featherweight, and in February 1990 beat John Doherty by a single point to take the British super featherweight title. He lost the title seven months later when he was stopped in the eleventh round by Hugh Forde.

In June 1991 he travelled to Italy to challenge for the WBO world junior lightweight title held by Kamel Bou-Ali. Bou-Ali stopped him in the third round, and this proved to be Jacobs' final fight.
