= Michael Armstrong (boxer) =

English boxer

Personal information
- Nationality: British
- Born: Michael Morris; 18 December 1968 (age 57) Moston, Cheshire, England
- Height: 5 ft 4 in (163 cm)
- Weight: Featherweight, super featherweight

Boxing career

Boxing record
- Total fights: 26
- Wins: 18
- Win by KO: 9
- Losses: 7
- Draws: 1

Michael Morris (born 18 December 1968), who fought under the name Michael Armstrong, is a British former boxer, who was British super featherweight champion in 1992.

== Career ==
Born in Moston, Cheshire and based in Stoke-on-Trent, Armstrong moved into boxing from kickboxing and made his professional debut in January 1988, knocking John Hales out in the first round. Beaten only twice in his first 15 fights, in September 1990 he challenged for Modesty Napunyi's Commonwealth featherweight title, losing in a ninth round knockout.

He won his next three fights, including a final eliminator against Darren Elsdon, setting up a challenge for John Doherty's British super featherweight title in April 1992 at the G-Mex Centre in Manchester. Armstrong stopped Doherty in the seventh round to become British champion. In July 1993, he was fined £1,000 and given an 18-months suspended sentence after being found guilty of a drug offence. He lost the British title in October when he was stopped in the sixth round by Neil Haddock.

He was out of the ring until May 1993, when he faced Jon Jo Irwin for the vacant WBO Penta-Continental super featherweight title, losing on points. Armstrong was stopped in the third round by Bamana Dibateza in October 1994 when an arm wound that had been stitched reopened. In May 1995 he challenged Floyd Havard for the British super featherweight title, losing by knockout in the ninth round.

He went on to start Armstrong's Gym in Salford.

In 2010, he received a four year prison sentence after pleading guilty to three counts of blackmail, eight of criminal damage and single counts of affray and illegal money lending, and ordered to pack back £268,992. After being released from prison in 2012, he returned to working as a boxing trainer and promoter.
