= Steve Sims (boxer) =

Wales boxer

Personal information
- Nickname: Sammy
- Nationality: Welsh
- Born: 10 October 1958 (age 67) Newport, Wales
- Height: 5 ft 7 in (170 cm)
- Weight: Featherweight; Super-featherweight; Lightweight

Boxing career

Boxing record
- Total fights: 29
- Wins: 14
- Win by KO: 4
- Losses: 14
- Draws: 1

Steve "Sammy" Sims (born 10 October 1958) is a Welsh former professional boxer. He held the British featherweight title in 1982, the Welsh Area super-featherweight title from 1985 to 1986 and challenged once for the European featherweight title in 1983.

== Career ==
Sims made his professional debut in June 1979, defeating Selvin Bell in a points decision (PTS). He suffered his first loss in his following fight, a fifth-round technical knockout (TKO) to Erig Roganesi. Sims fought frequently in his early career, fighting 14 times by November 1980, recording a 7–7 record. During this spell, he defeated future British bantamweight title holder Davy Larmour and suffered a defeat to another future bantamweight champion, John Feeney.

Following defeat to Feeney, Sims embarked on the longest unbeaten run of his career. He recorded a draw with Vernon Penprase in December 1980 before defeating him in a rematch six months later. He fought Jimmy Flint in October 1981. Flint entered the fight with a 27–2 record but suffered a knockout (KO) defeat to Sims, who went on to record a third straight victory by defeating Belgian Jean-Marc Renard.

When Patrick Cowdell vacated his British featherweight title in 1982, Sims was offered a fight against Terry McKeown for the vacant belt. The pair met in September 1982 in St. Andrew's Sporting Club. Sims knocked McKeown down in the 12th round, with his opponent falling out of the ring. The referee began a ten count against McKeown who reentered the ring on one knee as the referee reached ten, leading to Sims being declared the winner. McKeown unsuccessfully protested the call as Sims became the first Welshman to win the title since Howard Winstone in 1966.

Following his victory, Sims was set to face Barry McGuigan in his first title defence, being set to receive £7,000 for the bout. However, the temporary retirement of Cowdell resulted in Sims being nominated to face undefeated Italian Loris Stecca for the vacant European featherweight title. Sims ultimately chose to vacate his British title to take the fight against Stecca. Part of Sims' training regime for the fight involved running the 290 steps of the Newport Transporter Bridge, both up and down, ten times a day. Sims lost the fight to Stecca by TKO and went on to lose three of his next four fights. He moved up to super-featherweight in 1985 and defeated Steve Cleak for the Welsh Area title at his new weight. He also successfully defended the belt against Tony Borg. He unsuccessfully challenged Robert Dickie for the British featherweight title in 1986 and fought in two more bouts before retiring.

== Later life ==
After retiring from fighting, Sims opened Ringland Boxing Club in his hometown of Newport. He also set up Sammy's Community Hub in Alway. A documentary of his community work, entitled Boxing in the Blood, was premiered in his hometown in 2015.

== See also ==
- List of British featherweight boxing champions
