= John Feeney (boxer) =

British former boxer

Personal information
- Nationality: British
- Born: 15 May 1958 (age 68) Hartlepool, England
- Height: 5 ft 6 in (168 cm)
- Weight: Bantamweight, featherweight

Boxing career

Boxing record
- Total fights: 48
- Wins: 35
- Win by KO: 12
- Losses: 13

John Feeney (born 5 May 1958) is a British former boxer who was British bantamweight champion for two spells between 1981 and 1985, and who also challenged for the European bantamweight title four times, and the British featherweight title twice.

== Career ==
Born in Hartlepool in 1958, Feeney had success as an amateur, winning junior titles and was runner-up at the 1976 ABA Championships.

He made his professional debut in July 1977, with a second round stoppage of Larry Richards.

After winning his first 18 fights, he challenged for Johnny Owen's British and Commonwealth bantamweight titles in June 1980 at the Empire Pool, Wembley, losing in points.

In June 1981 he challenged for Valerio Nati's European title, losing on points despite putting Nati down in the second round. In September he was matched with Dave Smith for the vacant British title, stopping Smith in the eighth round to become British champion.

The first half of 1982 brought three successive defeats. He lost on points to Adriano Arreola in March, and in April was stopped in the thirteenth round when challenging for Paul Ferreri's Commonwealth title at the Sydney Opera House. In June he made a second challenge for the European title, losing on points to defending champion Giuseppe Fossati.

Two wins towards the end of the year were followed by a defence of his British title in January 1983 against Hugh Russell; Feeney lost the title after being disqualified in the thirteenth round for persistent misuse of the head. In November he regained the title, stopping Davy Larmour in the third round at the Kings Hall, Belfast, after Owen's death had left the title vacant. His third attempt at winning the European title came a month later, Feeney losing on points to Valter Giorgetti in Campobasso.

His fourth and final shot at the European title came in November 1984, losing to Ciro De Leva by unanimous decision.

In June 1985 he lost his British title when Ray Gilbody took a narrow decision.

By 1986, Feeney had moved up to featherweight, and in April faced Robert Dickie for the vacant British title, losing by half a point. He challenged Dickie for the title again in October, this time losing by a wider margin. He fought twice in 1987 before retiring from boxing.
