= Jim Moran (boxer) =

British boxer

Jimmy Moran
Personal information
- Full name: James John Moran
- Born: 27 February 1963 (age 63) Redditch, England
- Died: 18 Jan 2021 Redditch, England

Sport
- Sport: Boxing
Medal record
Boxing
Representing England
Commonwealth Games
| Gold medal – first place | 1986 Edinburgh | light-heavyweight |

James Moran (born 27 February 1963) is a British former boxer. He won a gold medal for Boxing at the 1986 commonwealth games in Edinburgh.

== Boxing career ==
He represented England and won a gold medal in the 81 kg light-heavyweight division, at the 1986 Commonwealth Games in Edinburgh, Scotland.

Moran was from Redditch and boxed for the Austin ABC and won the prestigious ABA light-heavyweight championship in 1986. Moran also went on to win the heavyweight title in 1987.
