= Darren Dyer =

English boxer (born 1966)

Personal information
- Nickname: The Phantom
- Born: 31 July 1966 (age 59) London, England
- Height: 1.70 m (5 ft 7 in)
- Weight: Welterweight

Boxing career
- Stance: Orthodox

Boxing record
- Total fights: 25
- Wins: 19
- Win by KO: 17
- Losses: 6 (5 by KO)
- Draws: 0
- No contests: 0
Medal record
Boxing
Representing England
Commonwealth Games
Gold medal – first place	1986 Edinburgh	welterweight

Darren Dyer (also known by his nickname The Phantome, born 31 July 1966 in London) is a British retired welterweight boxer.

== Boxing career ==
He was the ABA welterweight champion in 1986, fighting out of St. Monica's ABC.

He represented England and won a gold medal in the 67 kg welterweight division, at the 1986 Commonwealth Games in Edinburgh, Scotland.
