= Peter English (boxer) =

British boxer (born 1963)

Personal information
- Born: 18 August 1963 (age 63) Oldham, England

Sport
- Sport: Boxing
Medal record
Boxing
Representing England
Commonwealth Games
Silver medal – second place	1986 Edinburgh	featherweight

Peter English (born 1963) is a British retired boxer.

== Boxing career ==
He represented England and won a silver medal in the 57 kg featherweight division, at the 1986 Commonwealth Games in Edinburgh, Scotland.

English boxed for the Gallagher Boys ABC and won the prestigious ABA featherweight championship in 1987.

He turned professional on 18 October 1988 and fought in 6 fights.
