= Sugar Gibiliru =

British former boxer (born 1966)

Personal information
- Nationality: British
- Born: Dramani Gibiliru; 13 July 1966 (age 59) Liverpool, England
- Height: 5 ft 5 in (165 cm)
- Weight: Light welterweight Lightweight; Super featherweight

Boxing career

Boxing record
- Total fights: 55
- Wins: 16
- Win by KO: 8
- Losses: 32
- Draws: 7

Dramani "Sugar" Gibiliru (born 13 July 1966) is a British former boxer who was British super featherweight champion in 1991.

== Career ==
Born in Liverpool, he is the son of former Ghanaian lightweight and light welterweight, and West African welterweight champion Sugar Gibiliru Sr., who came to Britain in 1961.

He made his professional debut in November 1984, a points defeat at the hands of Steve Benny. His early career was undistinguished, winning only 7 of his first 39 fights, including an unsuccessful challenge for Pat Barrett's BBBofC Central Area light welterweight title.

He won his first title at lightweight, beating Tony Foster on points in January 1990 to take the vacant Central Area title. He moved down in weight again, to super featherweight, stopping Peter Gabbitus in his next fight to win the Central Area title at that weight in March. Two months later he was stopped by Mark Reefer in a challenge for the Commonwealth super featherweight title.

Gibiliru was unbeaten in his next four fights, setting up a challenge for Robert Dickie's British title in April 1991; Gibiliru stopped Dickie in the ninth round to become British champion. He lost the title in his first defence, losing on points to John Doherty in September.

He made a second challenge for the Commonwealth title in December 1991, losing narrowly on points to Paul Harvey. He beat Frankie Foster in March 1992, but was stopped in six rounds three months later by Michael Ayers. In December that year he was stopped in the first round by Ross Hale, and was then out of the ring for 17 months. He returned with wins over Norman Dhalie and Kelton McKenzie. He lost on points in March 1995 to Peter Judson in what proved to be his final fight.
