= Rod Douglas =

English boxer

Personal information
- Born: 20 October 1964 (age 61) London, England
Medal record
Men's Boxing
Representing England
Commonwealth Games
Gold medal – first place	1986 Edinburgh	Middleweight

Rod Douglas (born 20 October 1964) is an English boxer.

== Boxing career ==
Born in London, Douglas competed at the 1984 Summer Olympics in Los Angeles, where he reached the quarter finals.

He represented England and won a gold medal in the 75 kg middleweight division, at the 1986 Commonwealth Games in Edinburgh, Scotland.

Douglas boxed for the St. Georges ABC and Broad Street ABC and won the ABA middleweight championship in 1987 and was three times light-middleweight ABA champion from 1983 to 1985.
