= Robert Dickie (boxer) =

Welsh boxer (1964–2010)

Personal information
- Nationality: Welsh
- Born: 23 June 1964 Cefneithin, Carmarthenshire, Wales
- Died: 28 October 2010 (aged 46)
- Height: 5 ft 6 in (168 cm)
- Weight: Featherweight

Boxing career
- Stance: Orthodox

Boxing record
- Total fights: 28
- Wins: 22
- Win by KO: 15
- Losses: 2
- Draws: 4
- No contests: 0

Robert Dickie (23 June 1964 – 28 October 2010) was a Welsh professional boxer, fighting at both featherweight and super-featherweight. He was Welsh champion at featherweight, British champion at both weights and became WBC International super-featherweight champion in 1988. He is one of only four Welshmen to hold a British boxing title at different weights, the others being Johnny Basham, Pat Thomas and Jack Petersen.

== Boxing career ==
=== Bantamweight ===
Dickie turned professional in 1983, and fought his first pro bout, at bantamweight, against Billy Hough in Swindon in March of that year. The six round fight went the distance, and Dickie took the result on a points decision. He won his next three bouts, held in Scotland, England and then Wales, stopping all three opponents via technical knockout. His fifth match, against Danny Flynn at St. Andrew's Sporting Club in Glasgow, ended in a points draw. Just four months later, Dickie was again facing Flynn, this time for the vacant Scottish Area bantamweight title. The ten-round match was stopped in the fifth, with Dickie defeated, his only loss in his first five years as a professional.

=== Featherweight ===
Dickie's next fight was seven months later, against Dave Pratt, but now fighting at featherweight. He beat Pratt by points decision, before dispatching Charlie Coke via technical knockout on 24 October 1984. His next bout, against John Sharkey, ended in his opponent being disqualified for repeated headbutts. A win over journeyman Steve Enwright in a first round stoppage, in December 1984, was followed by a second attempt at a Scottish Area title, this time for the vacant featherweight belt. His opponent on 25 February was Sharkey who he faced just three months earlier. The match was a short affair, with Dickie recording his first clean knockout of his professional career, stopping the Glaswegian in the second round.

After taking the Scottish featherweight belt, Dickie completed 1985 with wins over John Maloney, Mark Reefer and Dean Bramhald, before undertaking his first overseas fight, in South Africa. There he faced future South African lightweight champion Frank Khonkhobe at the De Beers Stadium in Kimberley, the match ended in a points draw.

Returning to Britain, Dickie's next fight was for the vacant British featherweight title. Staged at the Royal Albert Hall on 9 April 1986, he defeated John Feeney on points to take the belt. He fought just twice more that year, but both were title defences. He stopped Welsh super-featherweight champion Steve Sims by knockout in the fourth round, and then successfully defended his title in a rematch with Feeney, another points decision.

=== Super-featherweight ===
After his two defences Dickie took a year out, relinquishing his titles to move up to super-featherweight. In October 1987 he beat Rocky Lawlor through a disqualification, before taking a points decision over American Arvell Campbell in January of the following year. This led to an attempt at the WBC International super-featherweight title held by Indonesian, Hengky Gun in March 1988. Dickie beat Gun by a technical knockdown in the fifth to become the WBC International super-featherweight champion. He only held onto the belt for five months, when he was stopped in the sixth by Tunisia's Kamel Bou-Ali in a title challenge at the Kings Hall in Stoke.

Dickie continued fighting after losing his belt, now chasing the British super-featherweight title. He only fought three times between 1989 and 1990, winning all through technical knockouts. On 30 April 1991 he faced Kevin Pritchard the British super-featherweight champion. The match was fought at the National Sports Centre in Cardiff, Dickie winning the belt in the eighth. He retired after losing his final two fights, including his British super-featherweight title to Sugar Gibiliru.

== Death and legacy ==
Dickie died from a heart attack at the age of 46, in October 2010. His sudden and untimely death left a wife and two sons devastated by his loss. Following his death, a charitable trust was launched in his memory, by his brother and brother-in-law. His wife and sons had no part in the charity and did not benefit from its proceeds. A charity dinner was held at Parc y Scarlets in 2011, among those attending from the world of boxing included past opponents Feeney and Sims, and Welsh fighters Colin Jones and Enzo Maccarinelli. Following his death, the Lonsdale Belt Dickie had sold twelve years before, was returned to his brothers and brother-in-law.

Dickie is one of four Welshmen to have won the British super-featherweight title, alongside Neil Haddock, Floyd Harvard and Gary Buckland; and is one of five Welsh boxers to have taken the British featherweight title, the others being Jim Driscoll, Peter Harris, Steve Sims and Howard Winstone.

== See also ==
- List of British featherweight boxing champions
