= Floyd Havard =

Wales boxer

Personal information
- Nationality: Welsh
- Born: Floyd Havard; 16 October 1965 (age 60) Swansea, Wales
- Height: 5 ft 8 in (173 cm)
- Weight: super featherweight

Boxing career
- Stance: Southpaw

Boxing record
- Total fights: 36
- Wins: 34
- Win by KO: 21
- Losses: 2
- Draws: 0
- No contests: 0

Floyd Havard (born 16 October 1965) is a Welsh former super featherweight boxer. He was twice British super featherweight champion, from 1988–1989 and 1994-1996. In 1994 he made an unsuccessful bid for the IBF super featherweight title against John John Molina.

== Boxing career ==
Swansea born Havard was a successful amateur boxer. He missed out in representing Britain in the 1984 Olympics to Kevin Taylor, but took the 1985 Amateur Boxing Association British featherweight title. He turned professional that same year, and began his career with an encounter with journeyman Dean Bramhald at Cardiff. This began a long string of winning results, and by April 1988 he had recorded 17 professional victories. On 18 May 1988, Havard was given a shot at the British super-featherweight title against the holder, Pat Cowdell. Cowdell was a natural featherweight, and past holder of the European featherweight belt, before he moved up to super-featherweight in 1984. Cowdell then took the European super-featherweight title, followed by the British title briefly in 1986 and again in 1987. This was Havard's first professional title fight, and his first scheduled for twelve rounds. The fight only lasted eight rounds, with Havard stopping Cowdell via technical knockout. Cowdell retired from boxing soon after. Havard later stated that beating Cowdell was "...the best night of my career."

Havard followed up his British title win with points victories over Canadian John Kalbhenn and American Idabeth Rojas, before facing John Doherty in his first defence of his belt. Fought on the 6 September 1989 at Afan Lido in Wales, the twelve round fight ended with Havard's retirement in the eleventh. Ahead on points, Havard broke his hand during the bout, and in pain, turned his back on his opponent and quit the fight.

After losing his belt, Havard took 18 months away from boxing, before returning in March 1991 to face Tony Foster as the main undercard event to the Gary De Roux vs. Sean Murphy British featherweight title bout. Despite Havard going down in the first round, he recovered to win the encounter on points. Havard built on this result with wins over George Ayeh and Patrick Kamy towards the end of 1991, then stopped Harry Escott via technical knockout in March 1992.

Havard's next fight was a rematch against Escott, 21 months later in December 1993. The match was Havard's only competitive before a big encounter with Puerto Rican John John Molina the IBF Super featherweight champion. Havard took Escott to the full eight rounds and was awarded the result on points. On the 22 January 1994, Havard and Molina met at the Welsh Institute of Sport in Cardiff. Havard had broken his nose two weeks earlier during sparring, and he later stated that he was in a poor frame of mind during the buildup to the fight and should have pulled out. The twelve-round match lasted until the sixth when Havard's corner retired him due to cuts.

Despite the loss Havard was back fighting two months later, with a challenge for his old title of British Super featherweight champion. The title was held by fellow Welshman Neil Haddock, and when Havard stopped Haddock in the tenth he regained his belt. Floyd fought and won on seven more occasions, including two title defences against Dave McHale and Michael Armstrong. His final bout was the defeat of Carl Allen on 30 November 1996 in Tylorstown.

== Later career ==
After leaving boxing, Havard worked in factories and carried out some security work for bands, such as the Spice Girls and Take That. He then spent five years working on the railways. Nine years after retiring as a professional boxer, he made an attempt to relaunch himself as a boxing agent, spending time in Ukraine in a bid to find boxing talent. By 2009 Havard was back fighting but at a semi-professional winning the Empire Boxing Federation British light-welterweight title.

Havard is one of only four Welshmen to have won the British super-featherweight title, alongside Robert Dickie, Neil Haddock and Gary Buckland.
