= Richard Finch (boxer) =

Australian boxer (born 1962)

Personal information
- Nationality: Australian
- Born: 29 August 1962 (age 63)

Sport
- Sport: Boxing
Medal record
Men's Boxing
Representing Australia
Commonwealth Games
Silver medal – second place	1986 Edinburgh	Light middleweight

Richard Finch (born 29 August 1962) is an Australian boxer. He competed in the men's light middleweight event at the 1984 Summer Olympics.
