= Mark Reefer =

English boxer

Personal information
- Nationality: English
- Born: Mark Thompson; 16 March 1964 (age 62) Hackney, England
- Height: 5 ft 5 in (1.65 m)
- Weight: featherweight super featherweight lightweight

Boxing career
- Stance: Southpaw

Boxing record
- Total fights: 32
- Wins: 23 (KO 15)
- Losses: 8 (KO 8)
- Draws: 1

Mark Reefer (born 16 March 1964 in Hackney) is an English professional feather/super feather/lightweight boxer of the 1990s, who won the British Boxing Board of Control (BBBofC) Southern Area lightweight title, and Commonwealth super featherweight title, and was a challenger for the Commonwealth lightweight title against Mo Hussein, European Boxing Union (EBU) super featherweight title against Daniel Londas, and World Boxing Council (WBC) International super featherweight title against Pedro Armando Gutierrez, his professional fighting weight varied from 125 pounds (57 kg), i.e. featherweight to 135 pounds (61 kg), i.e. lightweight.
