= Paul Ferreri =

Italian/Australian boxer

Personal information
- Nationality: Italian/Australian
- Born: Paolo Ferreri; 2 January 1948 Aidone, Sicily, Italy
- Died: 14 July 2017 (aged 69) Melbourne, Australia
- Weight: super fly/bantam/super bantam/feather/super featherweight

Boxing career
- Stance: Southpaw

Boxing record
- Total fights: 96
- Wins: 78 (KO 26)
- Losses: 13 (KO 2)
- Draws: 5

Paolo Ferreri (2 January 1948 – 14 July 2017), known as Paul Ferreri, was an Italian/Australian professional super fly/bantam/super bantam/feather/super featherweight boxer of the 1970s and '80s who won the Australian bantamweight title, Australian featherweight title, Australian super featherweight title, holding all three Australian titles simultaneously, Commonwealth bantamweight title (twice), and inaugural Commonwealth super bantamweight title, and was a challenger for the World Boxing Council (WBC) bantamweight title against Carlos Zárate, his professional fighting weight varied from 113 1/2 lb (51.5 kg; 8 st 1.5 lb), i.e. super flyweight to 129 1/2 lb (58.7 kg; 9 st 3.5 lb), i.e. super featherweight. He was inducted into the Australian National Boxing Hall of Fame in 2006.

He died on 14 July 2017 at the age of 69.
