= Najib Daho =

British boxer

Najib Daho (13 January 1959, Larache, Morocco – 29 August 1993, Morocco) was an English Commonwealth lightweight champion, and British super-featherweight champion boxer.

== Career ==
Daho's career is said to have begun when Najib was a child fighting for money in a small market square in Larache, Morocco, where he was known as the "Cåsbah kid." After moving to Manchester, England, he decided to develop his talent at the YMCA and was coached by Brian Robinson, in his early years fought ex world champion Ken Buchanon and was winning on points but in the last round was stopped by the wiley old champ after that he later was managed by Jack Trickett.

In 1986, Daho became British super-featherweight champion, and then he became Commonwealth Lightweight Champion in 1989. He retired soon after achieving the commonwealth at the age of 32.

In August 1993, Daho died in a traffic collision while visiting Morocco.

Daho is known for his first-round knockout to favorite Pat Cowdell.
