= Sean Murphy (boxer) =

English boxer (born 1964)

Personal information
- Nationality: English
- Born: 1 December 1964 (age 61) St Albans, England
- Height: 1.68 m (5 ft 6 in)
- Weight: Bantamweight; Featherweight

Boxing career

Boxing record
- Total fights: 27
- Wins: 22
- Win by KO: 14
- Losses: 5
- Draws: 0
- No contests: 0
Medal record
Men's boxing
Representing England
Commonwealth Games
Gold medal – first place	1986 Edinburgh	Bantamweight

Sean Murphy (born 1 December 1964) is an English boxing trainer and former professional fighter.

== Career ==
Born in St Albans, Murphy boxed as a professional between 1986 and 1994. Murphy represented England and won a gold medal at the 1986 Commonwealth Games in Edinburgh, Scotland.

After winning the prestigious ABA bantamweight title in 1985 and 1986, boxing for St. Albans ABC, he turned professional. Sean Murphy went on to win British and Commonwealth Featherweight titles. He defended his British Featherweight title for 2 fights losing it to Gary De Roux on Tuesday 5 March 1991. Sean Murphy retained the British title on Sunday 27 June 1993 against Alan McKay and was given the chance to fight for the WBO Featherweight World Title against Steve Robinson in Wales but he was Knocked Out in Round 9. Sean would then fight once more for the British and Commonwealth Lightweight Title however he was knocked out by Billy Schwer on 16 February 1994 ending his Professional Boxing Career.

After retiring from fighting, Murphy became a trainer at Finchley Amateur Boxing Club, based in Barnet, North London. He has trained the former WBA, WBO, IBF champion Anthony Joshua.
