= Hugh Forde (boxer) =

English boxer

Personal information
- Nationality: English
- Born: 7 May 1964 (age 62) Birmingham, England
- Height: 5 ft 9 in (1.75 m)
- Weight: super feather/light/light welter/welterweight

Boxing career
- Stance: Orthodox

Boxing record
- Total fights: 31
- Wins: 24 (KO 11)
- Losses: 7 (KO 5)

Hugh Forde (born 7 May 1964) is an English professional super feather/light/light welter/welterweight boxer of the 1980s and 1990s.

He won the inaugural British Boxing Board of Control (BBBofC) Midlands Area super featherweight title, BBBofC British super featherweight title, and Commonwealth super featherweight title, and was a challenger for the BBBofC British light welterweight title against Ross Hale.

Forde's professional fighting weight varied from 128 lb (58 kg; 9 st 2 lb) (super featherweight) to 143 lb (65 kg; 10 st 3 lb) (welterweight).
