= Thailand at the 1984 Summer Olympics =

- IOC code: THA
- NOC: National Olympic Committee of Thailand

in Los Angeles
- Competitors: 39 in 5 sports
- Flag bearer: Rangsit Yanothai
- Medals Ranked 33rd: Gold 0 Silver 1 Bronze 0 Total 1

Summer Olympics appearances (overview)
- 1952; 1956; 1960; 1964; 1968; 1972; 1976; 1980; 1984; 1988; 1992; 1996; 2000; 2004; 2008; 2012; 2016; 2020; 2024

Thailand competed at the 1984 Summer Olympics in Los Angeles, United States. The nation returned to the Summer Games after participating in the American-led boycott of the 1980 Summer Olympics.

== Medalists ==
Medal	Name	Sport	Event	Date
Silver	Dhawee Umponmaha	Boxing	Light Welterweight	11 August

== Results by event ==
=== Archery ===
Men's Individual Competition

- Amphol Amalekajorn – 2342 points (→ 46th place)
- Wachera Piyapattra – 2328 points (→ 50th place)

=== Athletics ===
Women's 100 metres

- Wallapa Tangjitnusom

- First Heat — 12.18s (→ did not advance)

Women's Long Jump

- Sarinee Phenglaor

- Qualification — 5.51 m (→ did not advance, 22nd place)

=== Boxing ===
Athlete	Event	First round	Second round	Third round	Quarterfinals	Semifinals	Final	
Athlete	Event	Opposition Result	Opposition Result	Opposition Result	Opposition Result	Opposition Result	Opposition Result	Rank
Sanpol Sang-Ano	Men's Light Flyweight	Mwangi (KEN); L RSC–3	did not advance					
Wanchai Pongsri	Men's Bantamweight	Bye	Orewa (NIG); L KO–2	did not advance				
Dhawee Umponmaha	Men's Light Welterweight	Pradhan (IND); W 5–0	Owiso (KEN); W 3–2	Griffiths (GBR); W 4–1	Maysonet (PUR); W 5–0	Fulger (ROU); W 5–0	Page (USA); L 0–5	2nd place, silver medalist(s)

=== Shooting ===
Men's 25 metre rapid fire pistol

- Opas Ruengpanyawoodhi (=13th place); Peera Piromrut (40th place)

Men's 50 metre pistol

- Somchai Thingpakdee (=31st place); Nirundon Lepananon (54th place)

Men's 10 metre air rifle

- Manop Leeprasansakul (=43rd place); Tanin Thaisinlp (47th place)

Men's 50 metre rifle three positions

- Chakrapan Theinthong (=41st place); Manop Leeprasansakul (=44th place)

Men's 50 metre rifle prone

- Udomsak Theinthong (=30th place); Tanin Thaisinlp (=55th place)

Men's 50 metre running target

- Rangsit Yanothai (nk)

Mixed trap

- Damrong Pachonyut (=45th place); Vudthi Bhirombhakdi (64th place)

Mixed skeet

- Somchai Chanthavanij (=58th place); Pichit Burapavong (68th place)

Women's 25 metre pistol

- Angsuman Chotisathein (19th place)

Women's 10 metre air rifle

- Siriwan Bhudvanbhen (31st place); Kanokwan Krittakom (33rd place)

Women's 50 metre rifle three positions

- Thiranun Jinda (=20th place)
