= Boxing at the 1982 Commonwealth Games =

- Venue: Brisbane Festival Hall
- Location: Brisbane, Australia
- Dates: 30 September to 9 October 1982

Boxing at the 1982 Commonwealth Games was the 12th appearance of the Boxing at the Commonwealth Games. The events were held in Brisbane, Australia, from 30 September to 9 October 1982 and featured contests in eleven weight classes.

The boxing events were held at the 5,000 seater Brisbane Festival Hall.

Kenya topped the boxing medal table for the second successive Commonwealth Games by virtue of winning one more silver medal than Nigeria.

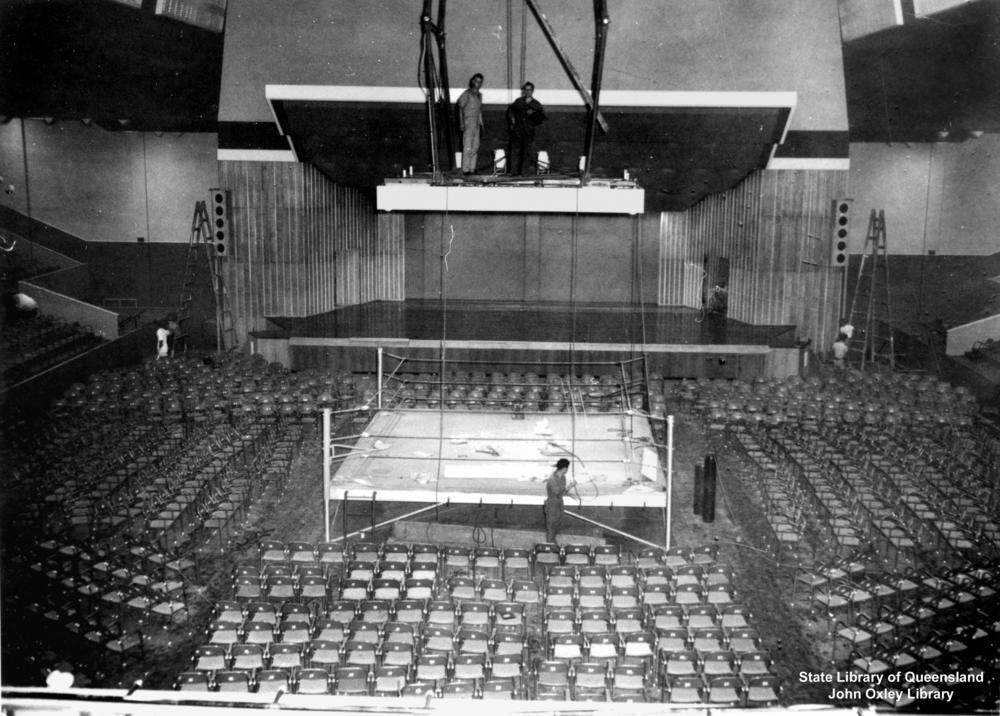
Brisbane Festival Hall

== Medal table ==
* Host nation (Australia)

Medals won by nation with totals, ranked by number of golds—sortable
Rank	Nation	Gold	Silver	Bronze	Total
1	Kenya	3	1	1	5
2	Nigeria	3	0	3	6
3	England	2	5	2	9
4	Canada	2	0	1	3
5	Fiji	1	0	0	1
6	Zambia	0	1	5	6
7	Australia*	0	1	4	5
8	Northern Ireland	0	1	1	2
9	Scotland	0	1	0	1
9	Uganda	0	1	0	1
11	Bahamas	0	0	1	1
11	India	0	0	1	1
11	New Zealand	0	0	1	1
11	Swaziland	0	0	1	1
11	Tanzania	0	0	1	1
Totals (15 entries)		11	11	22	44

== Medallists ==
Event	Gold	Silver	Bronze
Light Flyweight	Abraham Wachire (KEN)	John Lyon (ENG)	Lucky Siame (ZAM)
Light Flyweight	Abraham Wachire (KEN)	John Lyon (ENG)	Leonard Makhanya (SWZ)
Flyweight	Michael Mutua (KEN)	Joe Kelly (SCO)	Grant Richards (AUS)
Flyweight	Michael Mutua (KEN)	Joe Kelly (SCO)	Albert Musankabala (ZAM)
Bantamweight	Joe Orewa (NGR)	Roy Webb (NIR)	Ray Gilbody (ENG)
Bantamweight	Joe Orewa (NGR)	Roy Webb (NIR)	Richard Reilly (AUS)
Featherweight	Peter Konyegwachie (NGR)	Peter Hanlon (ENG)	Rodney Harberger (AUS)
Featherweight	Peter Konyegwachie (NGR)	Peter Hanlon (ENG)	Winfred Kabunda (ZAM)
Lightweight	Hussein Khalili (KEN)	Jim McDonnell (ENG)	Brian Tink (AUS)
Lightweight	Hussein Khalili (KEN)	Jim McDonnell (ENG)	Steve Larrimore (BAH)
Light Welterweight	Christopher Ossai (NGR)	Charles Owiso (KEN)	Clyde McIntosh (ENG)
Light Welterweight	Christopher Ossai (NGR)	Charles Owiso (KEN)	David Chibuye (ZAM)
Welterweight	Chris Pyatt (ENG)	Laston Mukobe (ZAM)	Charles Nwokolo (NGR)
Welterweight	Chris Pyatt (ENG)	Laston Mukobe (ZAM)	Chenanda Machaiah (IND)
Light Middleweight	Shawn O'Sullivan (CAN)	Nick Croombes (ENG)	Roland Omoruyi (NGR)
Light Middleweight	Shawn O'Sullivan (CAN)	Nick Croombes (ENG)	Tom Corr (NIR)
Middleweight	Jimmy Price (ENG)	Douglas Sam (AUS)	Jeremiah Okoroduddu (NGR)
Middleweight	Jimmy Price (ENG)	Douglas Sam (AUS)	Kevin McDermott (CAN)
Light Heavyweight	Fine Sani (FIJ)	Jonathan Kirisa (UGA)	Kevin Barry (NZL)
Light Heavyweight	Fine Sani (FIJ)	Jonathan Kirisa (UGA)	Joseph Poto (ZAM)
Heavyweight	Willie DeWit (CAN)	Harold Hylton (ENG)	William Isangura (TAN)
Heavyweight	Willie DeWit (CAN)	Harold Hylton (ENG)	Mohammed Abdallah (KEN)

== Results ==
=== Light-flyweight 48kg ===
Round	Winner	Loser	Score
Preliminary	(Eswatini) Leonard Makhanya	(Papua New Guinea) Jopha Yarawi	RSC 3
Quarter-Final	(Kenya) Brahim Wachire	(India) Birender Singh Thapa	PTS
Quarter-Final	(Zambia) Lucky Siame	(Northern Ireland) Gerry Hawkins	PTS
Quarter-Final	(England) John Lyon	(Ghana) Amon Neequaye	PTS
Quarter-Final	(Eswatini) Leonard Makhanya	(Australia) Greg Vanson	RSC 2
Semi-Final	(Kenya) Brahim Wachire	(Zambia) Lucky Siame	PTS
Semi-Final	(England) John Lyon	(Eswatini) Leonard Makhanya	PTS
Final	(Kenya) Brahim Wachire	(England) John Lyon	PTS

=== Flyweight 51kg ===
Round	Winner	Loser	Score
Quarter-Final	(Scotland) Joe Kelly	(Northern Ireland) Gerry Duddy	PTS
Quarter-Final	(Australia) Grant Richards	(Hong Kong) Choi Wong	RSC 1
Quarter-Final	(Kenya) Michael Mutua	(Uganda) Charles Lubulwa	PTS
Quarter-Final	(Zambia) Albert Musankabala	(India) Isaac Amaldas	PTS
Semi-Final	(Scotland) Joe Kelly	(Australia) Grant Richards	PTS
Semi-Final	(Kenya) Michael Mutua	(Zambia) Albert Musankabala	PTS
Final	(Kenya) Michael Mutua	(Scotland) Joe Kelly	PTS

=== Bantamweight 54kg ===
Round	Winner	Loser	Score
Preliminary	(Northern Ireland) Roy Webb	(New Zealand) Peter Warren	KO 2
Preliminary	(England) Ray Gilbody	(Fiji) Igenasio Mow	PTS
Preliminary	(Nigeria) Joe Orewa	(Guyana) Anthony Barrow	PTS
Preliminary	(Kenya) David Ouma	(India) Ganapathy Mandharan	PTS
Preliminary	(Canada) Dale Walters	(Solomon Islands) Jay Makana	KO 1
Preliminary	(Australia) Richard Reilly	(Vanuatu) Jeffrey Nauras	KO 1
Preliminary	(Uganda) John Siryakibbe	(Zambia) Stephen Maselino	PTS
Preliminary	(Ghana) Christian Kpakpo	(Hong Kong) Chan Kan Kong	PTS
Quarter-Final	(Nigeria) Joe Orewa	(Canada) Dale Walters	PTS
Quarter-Final	(England) Ray Gilbody	(Kenya) David Ouma	PTS
Quarter-Final	(Northern Ireland) Roy Webb	(Ghana) Christian Kpakpo	PTS
Quarter-Final	(Australia) Richard Reilly	(Uganda) John Siryakibbe	RSC 3
Semi-Final	(Nigeria) Joe Orewa	(England) Ray Gilbody	PTS
Semi-Final	(Northern Ireland) Roy Webb	(Australia) Richard Reilly	PTS
Final	(Nigeria) Joe Orewa	(Northern Ireland) Roy Webb	PTS

=== Featherweight 57kg ===
Round	Winner	Loser	Score
Preliminary	(Australia) Rodney Harberger	(Samoa) Uea Ulai	PTS
Preliminary	(Ghana) Akkuteh Amarteif	(Solomon Islands) Enoctt Siope	PTS
Preliminary	(Canada) Steve Nolan	(Fiji) Asesela Gonevakarua	PTS
Preliminary	(England) Peter Hanlon	(Uganda) Geofrey Nyeko	PTS
Preliminary	(New Zealand) Billy Meehan	(Papua New Guinea) Leo Ruru	PTS
Preliminary	(Nigeria) Peter Konyegwachie	(Kenya) John Wanjau	PTS
Preliminary	(Zambia) Winfred Kabunda	(Eswatini) Robert Lukhele	RSC 2
Preliminary	(India) Mariam Xavier	(Northern Ireland) Gary Duff	PTS
Quarter-Final	(Australia) Rodney Harberger	(Ghana) Akkuteh Amarteifo	RSC 3
Quarter-Final	(England) Peter Hanlon	(Canada) Steve Nolan	PTS
Quarter-Final	(Nigeria) Peter Konyegwachie	(New Zealand) Billy Meehan	PTS
Quarter-Final	(Zambia) Winfred Kabunda	(India) Mariam Xavier	PTS
Semi-Final	(England) Peter Hanlon	(Australia) Rodney Harberger	RSC 2
Semi-Final	(Nigeria) Peter Konyegwachie	(Zambia) Winfred Kabunda	PTS
Final	(Nigeria) Peter Konyegwachie	(England) Peter Hanlon	PTS

=== Lightweight 60kg ===
Round	Winner	Loser	Score
Preliminary	(Scotland) Alex Dickson	(Samoa) Vaomala Uiliata	PTS
Preliminary	(Kenya) Hussein Khalili	(Canada) John Kalbhenn	PTS
Preliminary	(England) Jim McDonnell	(Zambia) Oscar Nkhata	PTS
Preliminary	(Australia) Brian Tink	(New Zealand) Michael Sykes	PTS
Preliminary	(Uganda) William Galiwango	(Vanuatu) Jeffrey Christine	PTS
Preliminary	(Wales) Jonathan Alsop	(Papua New Guinea) Moses Ririan	PTS
Quarter-Final	(The Bahamas) Steve Larrymore	(Fiji) Jimilai Silomea	KO 2
Quarter-Final	(Kenya) Hussein Khalili	(Scotland) Alex Dickson	PTS
Quarter-Final	(England) Jim McDonnell	(Uganda) William Galiwango	PTS
Quarter-Final	(Australia) Brian Tink	(Wales) Jonathan Alsop	RSC 2
Semi-Final	(England) Jim McDonnell	(Australia) Brian Tink	PTS
Semi-Final	(Kenya) Hussein Khalili	(The Bahamas) Steve Larrymore	PTS
Final	(Kenya) Hussein Khalili	(England) Jim McDonnell	PTS

=== Light-welterweight 63.5kg ===
Round	Winner	Loser	Score
Extra Preliminary	(Samoa) King Faoa Wong	(Ghana) Tony Bowah-Kabir	PTS
Preliminary	(Nigeria) Christopher Ossai	(New Zealand) Apelu Ioane	PTS
Preliminary	(Canada) George Mason	(Scotland) Alistair Laurie	PTS
Preliminary	(Zambia) Dave Chibuye	(Australia) Shane Quaid	PTS
Preliminary	(Northern Ireland) Davy Irving	(Papua New Guinea) Vincent Anipinu	KO 2
Preliminary	(Vanuatu) Rawor Ecley	(Hong Kong) Edmond Wong Pok Cheung	PTS
Preliminary	(Kenya) Charles Owiso	(Fiji) Ray Galoa	RSC 1
Preliminary	(Samoa) King Faoa Wong	(Eswatini) Sandile Shongwe	KO 2
Preliminary	(England) Clyde McIntosh	(Zimbabwe) Eddie Ndlovu	PTS
Quarter-Final	(Nigeria) Christopher Ossai	(Vanuatu) Rawor Ecley	PTS
Quarter-Final	(Zambia) Dave Chibuye	(Canada) George Mason	PTS
Quarter-Final	(Kenya) Charles Owiso	(Northern Ireland) Davy Irving	PTS
Quarter-Final	(England) Clyde McIntosh	(Samoa) King Faoa Wong	PTS
Semi-Final	(Kenya) Charles Owiso	(England) Clyde McIntosh	PTS
Semi-Final	(Nigeria) Christopher Ossai	(Zambia) Dave Chibuye	PTS
Final	(Nigeria) Christopher Ossai	(Kenya) Charles Owiso	PTS

=== Welterweight 67kg ===
Round	Winner	Loser	Score
Preliminary	(England) Chris Pyatt	(New Zealand) Steven Renwick	PTS
Preliminary	(Scotland) John McAllister	(Northern Ireland) Ken Beattie	PTS
Preliminary	(Tanzania) Leonidas Njunwa	(Papua New Guinea) Obert Keri	RSC 3
Preliminary	(India) Chenanda Machaiah	(Ghana) Amartei Amarboye	KO 2
Preliminary	(Zambia) Laston Mukobe	(Fiji) Etonia Tuisuva	PTS
Preliminary	(Australia) Tony Williams	(Canada) Dwight Frazier	PTS
Quarter-Final	(Nigeria) Charles Nwokolo	(Kenya) Peter Wanyoke	PTS
Quarter-Final	(England) Chris Pyatt	(Scotland) John McAllister	PTS
Quarter-Final	(India) Chenanda Machaiah	(Tanzania) Leonidas Njunwa	PTS
Quarter-Final	(Zambia) Laston Mukobe	(Australia) Tony Williams	PTS
Semi-Final	(England) Chris Pyatt	(Nigeria) Charles Nwokolo	PTS
Semi-Final	(Zambia) Laston Mukobe	(India) Chenanda Machaiah	PTS
Final	(England) Chris Pyatt	(Zambia) Laston Mukobe	PTS

=== Light-middleweight 71kg ===
Round	Winner	Loser	Score
Preliminary	(Guyana) Mark Yaw	(Vanuatu) Maxime Nako	KO 2
Preliminary	(Canada) Shawn O'Sullivan	(Zimbabwe) Ambrose Mlilo	RSC 3
Preliminary	(Kenya) John Wanyoke Mbugua	(Zambia) Charles Silungwe	PTS
Preliminary	(Wales) Paul Lewis	(Papua New Guinea) Piamora Boas	PTS
Preliminary	(England) Nick Croombes	(Tanzania) Lucas Msomba	PTS
Preliminary	(Northern Ireland) Tom Corr	(Australia) David Hall	PTS
Quarter-Final	(Nigeria) Roland Omoruyi	(Scotland) David Milligan	PTS
Quarter-Final	(England) Nick Croombes	(Kenya) John Wanyoke Mbugua	PTS
Quarter-Final	(Canada) Shawn O'Sullivan	(Guyana) Mark Yaw	RSC 1
Quarter-Final	(Northern Ireland) Tom Corr	(Wales) Paul Lewis	PTS
Semi-Final	(England) Nick Croombes	(Nigeria) Roland Omoruyi	PTS
Semi-Final	(Canada) Shawn O'Sullivan	(Northern Ireland) Tom Corr	KO 2
Final	(Canada) Shawn O'Sullivan	(England) Nick Croombes	KO 2

=== Middleweight 75kg ===
Round	Winner	Loser	Score
Quarter-Final	(England) Jimmy Price	(Kenya) Augustus Oga	KO 3
Quarter-Final	(Nigeria) Jerry Okorodudu	(Papua New Guinea) Michael Rau	RSC 3
Quarter-Final	(Australia) Doug Sam	(Samoa) Nicky Nun Yan	RSC 1
Quarter-Final	(Canada) Kevin McDermott	(Scotland) Russell Barker	KO
Semi-Final	(Australia) Doug Sam	(Canada) Kevin McDermott	RSC 1
Semi-Final	(England) Jimmy Price	(Nigeria) Jerry Okorodudu	PTS
Final	(England) Jimmy Price	(Australia) Doug Sam	KO 1

=== Light-heavyweight 81kg ===
Round	Winner	Loser	Score
Preliminary	(Kenya) Raphael Mudire	(Vanuatu) Ben Douglas	RSC 1
Preliminary	(New Zealand) Kevin Barry	(Samoa) Irwin Ah Hoy	PTS
Quarter-Final	(Zambia) Joseph Poto	(Australia) Benny Pike	PTS
Quarter-Final	(Fiji) Fine Sani	(Canada) Kevin Drew	PTS
Quarter-Final	(Uganda) Jonathan Kirisa	(Tanzania) Michael Nassoro	PTS
Quarter-Final	(New Zealand) Kevin Barry	(Kenya) Raphael Mudire	RSC 1
Semi-Final	(Uganda) Jonathan Kirisa	(New Zealand) Kevin Barry	w/o
Semi-Final	(Fiji) Fine Sani	(Zambia) Joseph Poto	KO 2
Final	(Fiji) Fine Sani	(Uganda) Jonathan Kirisa	w/o

=== Heavyweight +81kg ===
Round	Winner	Loser	Score
Quarter-Final	(Tanzania) William Isangura	(Australia) Torence Archer	RSC 1
Quarter-Final	(England) Harold Hylton	(India) Kaur Singh	PTS
Quarter-Final	(Kenya) Abdalla Kent	(Uganda) Dodovic Owiny	PTS
Semi-Final	(England) Harold Hylton	(Kenya) Abdalla Kent	RSC 2
Semi-Final	(Canada) Willie deWit	(Tanzania) William Isangura	RSC 1
Final	(Canada) Willie deWit	(England) Harold Hylton	KO 1
