= Boxing at the 1984 Summer Olympics – Light welterweight =

Olympic boxing tournament

Light welterweight boxing at the Games of the XXIII Olympiad
- Venue: Los Angeles Memorial Sports Arena
- Dates: 29 July – 11 August 1984
- Competitors: 37 from 37 nations

Medalists
1st place, gold medalist(s)		Jerry Page	United States
2nd place, silver medalist(s)		Dhawee Umponmaha	Thailand
3rd place, bronze medalist(s)		Mircea Fulger	Romania
3rd place, bronze medalist(s)		Mirko Puzović	Yugoslavia

The men's light welterweight event was part of the boxing programme at the 1984 Summer Olympics. The weight class allowed boxers of up to 63.5 kilograms to compete. The competition was held from 29 July to 11 August 1984. 37 boxers from 37 nations competed.

== Medalists ==
Gold	Jerry Page; United States
Silver	Dhawee Umponmaha; Thailand
Bronze	Mircea Fulger; Romania
Bronze	Mirko Puzović; Yugoslavia

== Results ==
The following boxers took part in the event:

Rank	Name	Country
1	Jerry Page	United States
2	Dhawee Umponmaha	Thailand
3T	Mircea Fulger	Romania
3T	Mirko Puzović	Yugoslavia
5T	Kim Dong-Kil	South Korea
5T	Jean-Pierre Mbereke-Baban	Cameroon
5T	Lotfi Belkhir	Tunisia
5T	Jorge Maysonet	Puerto Rico
9T	Javid Aslam	Norway
9T	Octavio Robles	Mexico
9T	Ikhlef Ahmed Hadj Allah	Algeria
9T	Steve Larrimore	Bahamas
9T	Stefan Sjöstrand	Sweden
9T	Rushdy Armanios	Egypt
9T	Dave Griffiths	Great Britain
9T	Charles Nwokolo	Nigeria
17T	Juma Bugingo	Tanzania
17T	Lisiate Lavulo	Tonga
17T	Helmut Gertel	West Germany
17T	Hannu Vuorinen	Finland
17T	Umesh Maskey	Nepal
17T	Ramy Zialor	Seychelles
17T	Denis Lambert	Canada
17T	Phillimon Ayesu	Malawi
17T	Jean Duarte	France
17T	Hassan Lahmar	Morocco
17T	Kunihiro Miura	Japan
17T	Bhutana Magwaza	Swaziland
17T	Clifton Charleswell	Virgin Islands
17T	Charles Owiso	Kenya
17T	Apelu Ioane	Samoa
17T	William Galiwango	Uganda
33T	Jaslal Pradhan	India
33T	Muenge Kafuanka	Zaire
33T	Evaristo Mazzón	Uruguay
33T	Dimus Chisala	Zambia
33T	Anthony Rose	Jamaica

=== First round ===
- Dhawee Umponmaha (THA) def. Jaslal Pradhan (IND), 5:0
- Jorge Maysonet (PUR) def. Muenge Kafuanka (ZAI), RSC-1
- Apelu Ioane (SAM) def. Evaristo Mazzon (URU), 5:0
- Charles Nwokolo (NGR) def. Dimus Chisala (ZAM), 5:0
- William Galiwango (UGA) def. Anthony Rose (JAM), 5:0

=== Second round ===
- Kim Dong-Kil (KOR) def. Juma Bugingo (TNZ), RSC-2
- Javid Aslam (NOR) def. Lisiate Lavulo (TNG), RSC-2
- Jerry Page (USA) def. Helmut Gertel (FRG), 5:0
- Ostavio Robles (MEX) def. Hannu Vuorinen (FIN), 3:2
- Ahmed Hadjala (ALG) def. Umesh Maskey (NEP), RSC-2
- Jean Mbereke (CMR) def. Ramy Zialor (SEY), 5:0
- Mirko Puzović (YUG) def. Denis Lambert (CAN), 5:0
- Steve Larrimore (BAH) def. Philimon Ayesu (MLW), 3:2
- Mircea Fulger (ROU) def. Jean Duarte (FRA), RSC-1
- Stefan Sjøstrand (SWE) def. Hassan Lahmar (MAR), RSC-2
- Lofti Belkhir (TUN) def. Kunihiro Miuro (JPN), 4:1
- Roshdy Armanios (EGY) def. Bhutana Magwaza (SWZ), RSC-2
- David Griffiths (GBR) def. Clifton Charleswell (VIS), 5:0
- Dhawee Umponmaha (THA) def. Charles Owiso (KEN), 3:2
- Jorge Maysonet (PUR) def. Apelu Ioane (SAM), 5:0
- Charles Nwokolo (NGR) def. William Galiwango (UGA), 5:0

=== Third round ===
- Kim Dong-Kil (KOR) def. Javid Aslam (NOR), 5:0
- Jerry Page (USA) def. Ostavio Robles (MEX), 5:0
- Jean Mbereke (CMR) def. Ahmed Hadjala (ALG), 4:1
- Mirko Puzović (YUG) def. Steve Larrimore (BAH), 5:0
- Mircea Fulger (ROU) def. Stefan Sjøstrand (SWE), 5:0
- Lofti Belkhir (TUN) def. Roshdy Armanios (EGY), 5:0
- Dhawee Umponmaha (THA) def. David Griffiths (GBR), 4:1
- Jorge Maysonet (PUR) def. Charles Nwokolo (NGR), 3:2

=== Quarterfinals ===
- Jerry Page (USA) def. Kim Dong-Kil (KOR), 4:1
- Mirko Puzović (YUG) def. Jean Mbereke (CMR), 5:0
- Mircea Fulger (ROU) def. Lofti Belkhir (TUN), 5:0
- Dhawee Umponmaha (THA) def. Jorge Maysonet (PUR), 5:0

=== Semifinals ===
- Jerry Page (USA) def. Mirko Puzović (YUG), 5:0
- Dhawee Umponmaha (THA) def. Mircea Fulger (ROU), 5:0

=== Final ===
- Jerry Page (USA) def. Dhawee Umponmaha (THA), 5:0
