= Boxing at the 1984 Summer Olympics – Heavyweight =

Olympic boxing tournament

Heavyweight boxing at the Games of the XXIII Olympiad
- Venue: Los Angeles Memorial Sports Arena
- Dates: 31 July – 11 August 1984
- Competitors: 19 from 19 nations

Medalists
1st place, gold medalist(s)		Henry Tillman	United States
2nd place, silver medalist(s)		Willie DeWit	Canada
3rd place, bronze medalist(s)		Angelo Musone	Italy
3rd place, bronze medalist(s)		Arnold Vanderlyde	Netherlands

The men's heavyweight event was part of the boxing programme at the 1984 Summer Olympics. The weight class allowed boxers of up to 91 kilograms to compete. The competition was held from 31 July to 11 August 1984. 19 boxers from 19 nations competed.

== Medalists ==
Gold	Henry Tillman; United States
Silver	Willie DeWit; Canada
Bronze	Angelo Musone; Italy
Bronze	Arnold Vanderlyde; Netherlands

== Results ==
The following boxers took part in the event:

Rank	Name	Country
1	Henry Tillman	United States
2	Willie DeWit	Canada
3T	Angelo Musone	Italy
3T	Arnold Vanderlyde	Netherlands
5T	Georgios Stefanopoulos	Greece
5T	Dodovic Owiny	Uganda
5T	Tevita Taufo'ou	Tonga
5T	Håkan Brock	Sweden
9T	Doug Young	Great Britain
9T	Egerton Forster	Sierra Leone
9T	Mohamed Bouchiche	Algeria
9T	Michael Kenny	New Zealand
9T	Kaur Singh	India
9T	Loi Faaeteete	Samoa
9T	Alex Stewart	Jamaica
16T	Magne Havnå	Norway
16T	Virgilio Frias	Dominican Republic
16T	Naasan Ajjoub	Syria
16T	James Omondi	Kenya

=== First round ===
- Håkan Brock (SWE) def. Magne Havnå (NOR), RSC-2
- Alex Stewart (JAM) def. Virgilio Frias (DOM), KO-2
- Kaur Singh (IND) def. Nassam Ajjoub (SYR), 5:0
- Angelo Musone (ITA) def. James Omondi (KEN), 5:0

=== Second round ===
- Georgios Stefanopoulos (GRE) def. Douglas Young (GBR), KO-2
- Arnold Vanderlyde (HOL) def. Egerton Forster (SLE), 4:1
- Willie DeWit (CAN) def. Mohamed Bouchiche (ALG), 5:0
- Dodovic Owiny (UGA) def. Michael Kenny (NZL), RSC-2
- Henry Tillman (USA) def. Kaur Singh (IND), RSC-1
- Tevita Taufo'ou (TNG) def. Loi Faateete (SAM), 4:1
- Håkan Brock (SWE) def. Alex Stewart (JAM), 5:0

=== Quarterfinals ===
- Arnold Vanderlyde (HOL) def. Georgios Stefanopoulos (GRE), 5:0
- Willie DeWit (CAN) def. Dodovic Owiny (UGA), KO-1
- Henry Tillman (USA) def. Tevita Taufo'ou (TNG), RSC-2
- Angelo Musone (ITA) def. Håkan Brock (SWE), 5:0

=== Semifinals ===
- Willie DeWit (CAN) def. Arnold Vanderlyde (HOL), 3:2
- Henry Tillman (USA) def. Angelo Musone (ITA), 5:0

=== Final ===
- Henry Tillman (USA) def. Willie DeWit (CAN), 5:0
