= Hannu Vuorinen =

Finnish boxer

Personal information
- Nickname: The Hammer
- Nationality: Finnish
- Born: Hannu Sakari Vuorinen; 18 January 1959 Helsinki, Finland
- Died: 19 August 2016 (aged 57) Helsinki, Finland
- Height: 1.79 m (5 ft 10 in)
- Weight: Light welterweight

Boxing career

Boxing record
- Total fights: 8
- Wins: 6
- Win by KO: 4
- Losses: 1
- Draws: 1
Medal record
Men's amateur boxing
Representing Finland
Nordic Championships
Gold medal – first place	1984 Bergen	Light welterweight

Hannu Sakari Vuorinen (18 January 1959 – 19 August 2016) was a Finnish professional boxer who competed from 1988 to 1990. As an amateur, he competed in the men's light welterweight event at the 1984 Summer Olympics and won a gold medal at the 1984 Nordic Championships.

== Amateur career ==
Vourinen had a highly-decorated amateur career, fighting around 130 times. In 1980, he won a silver medal at the Finnish championships, losing to Esko Pallaspuro in the final. He also reached the finals of the prestigious Chemistry Cup in Germany in 1981, losing to local fighter Thomas Schulz. He won a gold medal at the 1982 edition of the Olympic-style Tammer Tournament. In 1983, he defeated Joni Nyman for his first Finnish national title.

Vuorinen won a light-welterweight gold medal at the 1984 Nordic Championships held in Bergen, defeating Javid Aslam in the final. That summer, Vuorinen would be defeated by Octavio Robles in his only match the 1984 Summer Olympics in Los Angeles. He returned to Finland and won his second consecutive national title by beating Jyrki Eskelinen in the final. In 1987, he represented the Finnish national team in a dual match against the Kentucky Golden Gloves team, defeating Harvey Simms by decision at the Louisville Gardens.

He spent his entire amateur career with Helsingin Tarmo boxing club, where he later served as a coach.

== Professional boxing ==
Vuorinen and long time rival Joni Nyman both turned professional on the same night in Helsinki on 14 November 1988. Vourinen faced Jamaica's Stan King in a fight scheduled for six rounds but stopped his opponent earning a knockout victory after 2:20 of the fifth round. He had eight bouts as a pro, losing only once to Darrin Morris in February 1990 and never hitting the canvas.

== Personal life ==
Vuorinen's father represented Helsingin Tarmo in boxing and wrestling while all four of his brothers – Simon, Jussi, Vesa and Reijo – boxed at the club. Reijo won multiple Finnish national titles and competed at the 1991 and 1995 World Championships. He also won a gold medal at the 1989 Tammer Tournament, seven years after Hannu.

Vuorinen was married and had three children. He died of a heart attack at his home in Helsinki on 19 August 2016.
