= Henry Tillman =

American boxer (born 1960)

Personal information
- Nationality: American
- Born: August 1, 1960 (age 66) Los Angeles, California, U.S.
- Height: 6 ft 3 in (191 cm)
- Weight: Cruiserweight; Heavyweight

Boxing career
- Reach: 77.5 in (197 cm)
- Stance: Orthodox

Boxing record
- Total fights: 31
- Wins: 25
- Win by KO: 16
- Losses: 6
- Draws: 0
- No contests: 0
Medal record
Men's amateur boxing
Representing the United States
Olympic Games
Gold medal – first place	1984 Los Angeles	Heavyweight
Pan American Games
Silver medal – second place	1983 Caracas	Heavyweight

Henry Durand Tillman (born August 1, 1960) is an American former professional boxer. He won a gold medal at the 1984 Olympics as a Heavyweight. He scored notable wins over Cruiserweight Champions Uriah Grant and Tyrone Booze.

== Early life ==
Tillman was born in Los Angeles, California.

== Amateur career ==
Tillman twice defeated Mike Tyson as an amateur, winning both bouts via close decisions. Tillman went on to win heavyweight gold at the Los Angeles Olympics against highly touted Canadian boxer Willie DeWitt, considered the world's #1 amateur heavyweight by the AIBA in 1984 (to whom he lost in 1988 in professionals).

=== Highlights ===
United States National Championships (super heavyweight), Indianapolis, Indiana, December 1982:

- 1/16: Defeated Howard Lake by split decision, 3–2
- 1/8: Defeated William Ross RSC 2
- 1/4: Lost to Mark Mahone by majority decision, 1–4

USA–USSR Duals (super heavyweight), Indiana Convention Center, Indianapolis, Indiana, March 1983:

- Lost to Alexander Yagubkin (Soviet Union) by decision

USA–Cuba Duals (heavyweight), Havana, Cuba, April 1983:

- Lost to Hermenegildo Báez (Cuba) by unanimous decision, 0–5

(gold) National Sports Festival (heavyweight), Olympic Training Center, Colorado Springs, Colorado, June 1983:

- 1/2: Defeated Henry Milligan RSC 2
- Finals (Pan Am Trials): Defeated Richard Johnson by majority decision, 4–1

Pan Am Box-Offs (178 lbs), St. Louis, Missouri, August 1983:

- Defeated (no data available)

(silver) Pan American Games (heavyweight), Caracas, Venezuela, August 1983:

- 1/2: Defeated Virgilio Frias (Dominicana) by majority decision, 4–1
- Finals: Lost to Aurelio Toyo (Cuba) by majority decision, 1–4

USA–Bulgaria Duals (light heavyweight), Rapid City, South Dakota, October 1983:

- Lost to Deyan Kirilov (Bulgaria) by unanimous decision, 0–3

United States National Championships (heavyweight), Colorado Springs, Colorado, November 1983:

- 1/8: Lost to Henry Milligan by split decision, 2–3

USA–Combined Team of GBR & Canada Duals (heavyweight), Reno, Nevada, November 1983:

- Finals: Lost to Willie DeWitt (Canada) KO 1 (1:55)

National Golden Gloves (heavyweight), St. Louis, Missouri, April 1984:

- 1/4: Defeated Terry Anderson by decision
- 1/2: Lost to Jonathan Littles by walkover

Olympic Trials (heavyweight), Tarrant County Convention Center, Fort Worth, Texas, June 1984:

- 1/4: Defeated Olian Alexander by majority decision, 4–1
- 1/2: Defeated James Pritchard by majority decision, 4–1
- Finals: Defeated Mike Tyson by unanimous decision, 5–0 (Tillman knocked down at 2:02 of the 1st rd)

Olympic Box-Offs (heavyweight), Caesars Palace, Las Vegas, Nevada, July 1984:

- Defeated Mike Tyson by majority decision, 4–1

(gold) Olympic Games (heavyweight), Los Angeles, California, August 1984:

- 1/8: Defeated Kaliq Singh (India) RSCH 1
- 1/4: Defeated Tevita Taufo'ou (Tonga) RSCH 2
- 1/2: Defeated Angelo Musone (Italy) by unanimous decision, 5–0
- Finals: Defeated Willie DeWitt (Canada) by unanimous decision, 5–0

== Professional career ==
Tillman turned pro in 1984 as a cruiserweight and had a disappointing professional career, primarily due to a weak chin. In 1986, he was knocked down twice and upset by Bert Cooper via a decision. In 1987 he secured a bout at WBA Cruiserweight Title holder Evander Holyfield. Holyfield dropped Tillman three times en route to a 7th-round TKO, according to WBA rules. Tillman later lost to Willie DeWitt in a rematch of their 1984 Heavyweight Olympic Final bout. In 1990, he took on Mike Tyson in Tyson's comeback bout after his loss to James "Buster" Douglas. Tyson knocked him out in the first round. He finished his professional career with a record of 25-6-0 with 16 knockouts.

In the movie Rocky V, Tillman played contender "Tim Simms" who lost a bout to "Tommy Gunn" played by Tommy Morrison.

== Personal life ==
At the 1984 Summer Olympics Henry met his bride-to-be Gina Hemphill, a granddaughter of Jesse Owens, she carried the torch into the Los Angeles Coliseum at the opening ceremony, and worked as a production assistant on The Oprah Winfrey Show in Chicago. In 1987 they were married among friends and Olympic teammates.

== Legal issues ==
In February 2001, Tillman was sentenced to six years in prison for a 1996, attempted murder and voluntary manslaughter charge, and released from custody in 2002. In July 2004, Tillman was sentenced to 37 months in prison after pleading guilty to federal identity theft charges.

== Professional boxing record ==
25 Wins (16 knockouts, 9 decisions), 6 Losses (4 knockouts, 2 decisions)
Result	Opp; Record	Opponent	Type	Round	Date	Location	Notes
Loss	28-3-2	(United States) Terry Davis	KO	7	1992-09-15	(United States) Fort Lauderdale, Florida, U.S.	NBA Continental Americas Heavyweight Title.
Win	32-14-1	(United States) Eddie Taylor	TKO	6	1992-04-21	(United States) Tampa, Florida, U.S.	
Win	28-16-1	(United States) Mark Lee	UD	10	1992-03-26	(United States) Irvine, California, U.S.	
Win	15-30-2	(United States) Rick Kellar	TKO	4	1990-11-29	(United States) Kalamazoo, Michigan, U.S.	
Win	5-12	(United States) Lynwood Jones	UD	10	1990-10-26	(United States) Daytona Beach, Florida, U.S.	
Win	12-30-6	(United States) Danny Blake	UD	10	1990-08-30	(United States) Daytona Beach, Florida, U.S.	
Loss	37-1	(United States) Mike Tyson	KO	1	1990-06-16	(United States) Las Vegas, Nevada, U.S.	Tillman knocked out at 2:47 of the first round.
Win	9-9-2	(United States) Tim Morrison	TKO	2	1990-02-17	Edmonton, Alberta, Canada	
Win	3-5	(Mexico) Gerardo Valero	KO	2	1990-01-30	(United States) Reseda, California, U.S.	
Win	8-5-1	(United States) Danny Wofford	PTS	10	1989-12-09	(United States) Daytona Beach, Florida, U.S.	
Loss	20-1-1	(Canada) Willie DeWitt	UD	10	1988-03-29	Edmonton, Alberta, Canada	
Loss	13-14-2	(United States) Dwain Bonds	TKO	8	1987-11-20	(United States) Las Vegas, Nevada, U.S.	
Win	25-12	(United States) Danny Sutton	KO	7	1987-08-22	(United States) Columbia, South Carolina, U.S.	Sutton knocked out at 1:37 of the seventh round.
Win	13-3-1	(United States) Kevin P. Porter	UD	10	1987-07-11	(United States) Atlantic City, New Jersey, U.S.	
Win	6-11-1	(United States) Woody Clark	TKO	7	1987-06-07	(United States) Providence, Rhode Island, U.S.	Referee stopped the bout at 1:59 of the seventh round.
Loss	13-0	(United States) Evander Holyfield	TKO	7	1987-02-14	(United States) Reno, Nevada, U.S.	For WBA cruiserweight title
Win	9-11-1	(United States) Stanley Ross	TKO	4	1986-12-26	(United States) Las Vegas, Nevada, U.S.	
Win	11-5-2	(United States) Tyrone Booze	UD	10	1986-10-17	(United States) Las Vegas, Nevada, U.S.	
Win	10-7-1	(United States) Oscar Holman	TKO	6	1986-09-24	(United States) Las Vegas, Nevada, U.S.	
Win	13-3	(Canada) Cedric Parsons	KO	1	1986-08-19	(United States) Las Vegas, Nevada, U.S.	Parsons knocked out at 2:20 of the first round.
Loss	11-1	(United States) Bert Cooper	UD	12	1986-06-15	(United States) Atlantic City, New Jersey, U.S.	NABF Cruiserweight Title.
Win	29-9	(Nigeria) Bash Ali	TKO	1	1986-04-22	(United States) Las Vegas, Nevada, U.S.	NABF Cruiserweight Title.
Win	18-3	(United States) Reggie Gross	UD	10	1986-03-04	(United States) Atlantic City, New Jersey, U.S.	
Win	6-3	(United States) Sylvester Lee	TKO	1	1986-02-02	(United States) Hollywood, Florida, U.S.	Referee stopped the bout at 2:15 of the first round.
Win	5-3-2	(United States) Richard Scott	UD	6	1985-09-18	(United States) Atlantic City, New Jersey, U.S.	
Win	8-2	(United States) Larry Phelps	TKO	2	1985-08-11	(United States) Hollywood, California, U.S.	Referee stopped the bout at 1:11 of the second round.
Win	28-30-5	(United States) Leroy Caldwell	PTS	6	1985-06-30	(United States) Las Vegas, Nevada, U.S.	
Win	2-11-1	(United States) John Williams	TKO	1	1985-05-12	(United States) Tyler, Texas, U.S.	Referee stopped the bout at 0:57 of the first round.
Win	2-1	(United States) Andre Crowder	TKO	1	1985-04-18	(United States) Atlantic City, New Jersey, U.S.	
Win	7-2-1	(United States) Mickey Pryor	TKO	4	1985-03-05	(United States) Dallas, Texas, U.S.	Referee stopped the bout at 0:51 of the fourth round.
Win	1-0	(Jamaica) Uriah Grant	TKO	2	1984-12-07	(United States) Houston, Texas, U.S.	
