= Maysonet =

Maysonet is a surname of French origin and a variant of the surname Maisonette also spelled Maisonet. Notable people with the surname include:

- Edwin Maysonet (born 1981), Puerto Rican baseball player
- Jorge Maysonet (born 1964), Puerto Rican boxer
- Miguel Maysonet (born 1989), Puerto Rican football player
- Cristian Maysonet (born 1990), Puerto Rican Flight Attendant
