= Musone (surname) =

Musone is a surname. Notable people with the surname include:

- Angelo Musone (born 1963), Italian boxer
