= Alex Stewart (boxer) =

English boxer

Personal information
- Nickname: The Destroyer
- Born: 28 June 1964 London, England
- Died: 16 November 2016 (aged 52) Mount Vernon, New York, U.S.
- Height: 1.91 m (6 ft 3 in)
- Weight: Heavyweight

Boxing career
- Reach: 199 cm (78.5 in)
- Stance: Orthodox

Boxing record
- Total fights: 53
- Wins: 43
- Win by KO: 40
- Losses: 10
Medal record
Men's boxing
Representing Jamaica
Pan American Games
Bronze medal – third place	1983 Caracas	Heavyweight

Alex Stewart (28 June 1964 – 16 November 2016) was a British-born American professional boxer. He represented Jamaica at the 1984 Olympics, and won a bronze medal in the heavyweight division at the 1983 Pan American Games. During his professional career, he fought world champions Mike Tyson, Evander Holyfield, George Foreman, Oleg Maskaev, and Michael Moorer. Known for being a strong finisher, 40 of his 43 career wins came inside the distance.

== Amateur career ==
Stewart was a member of the Jamaican 1984 Olympic team. He was beaten by Sweden's Håkan Brock in the quarter final of the heavyweight competition, losing by a 5–0 decision. A year earlier he won a bronze medal at the Pan American Games. He lost to Michael Bentt in a thrilling match in the 1985 Heavyweight Golden Gloves Finals.

=== Highlights ===
(bronze) Pan American Games (heavyweight), Caracas, Venezuela, August 1983:

- 1/4: Defeated Jorge Dascola (Argentina) KO 1
- 1/2: Lost to Aurelio Toyo (Cuba) RSC 2

Olympic Games (heavyweight), Los Angeles, California, August 1984:

- 1/16: Defeated Virgilio Frias (Dominicana) KO 2
- 1/8: Lost to Håkan Brock (Sweden) 0–5

(silver) National Golden Gloves (heavyweight), 1985:

- Finals: Lost to Michael Bentt

== Professional career ==
Nicknamed "The Destroyer", Stewart did just that in the heavyweight ranks, at least early in his career. Stewart reeled off 24 consecutive wins, all by KO, prior to his defeat to Evander Holyfield, to whom he lost twice.

Stewart is probably best known for being blown out by Mike Tyson in the first round in 1990 at Trump Plaza in Atlantic City., and lost to other notable heavyweights of his era, including Michael Moorer, George Foreman, and Oleg Maskaev.

Stewart's loss to Foreman is likely his most notable ring performance. Although Foreman knocked him down twice, Stewart recovered to lose a narrow majority decision to Foreman, in which Foreman was badly swollen about the face.

== Retirement and death ==
After two consecutive knockout losses, Stewart retired from boxing in 1999, and after retiring worked in the New York area for a liquor distributor. Stewart died in Mount Vernon, New York in November 2016 of a blood clot in his lung.

== Professional boxing record ==
53 fights	43 wins	10 losses
By knockout	40	7
By decision	3	3

No.	Result	Record	Opponent	Type	Round, time	Date	Location	Notes
53	Loss	43–10	(Cuba) Jorge Luis González	TKO	2 (10), 2:38	6 Jun 1999	(United States) New Frontier Hotel, Las Vegas, Nevada, U.S.	
52	Loss	43–9	(United States) Lance Whitaker	TKO	7 (10), 1:40	16 Jan 1999	(United States) MGM Grand, Las Vegas, Nevada, U.S.	
51	Win	43–8	(United States) Ezra Sellers	TKO	3 (10), 2:43	8 Oct 1998	(United States) Harrah's Casino, Kansas City, Missouri, U.S.	
50	Loss	42–8	(United States) Phil Jackson	UD	10	24 Jul 1998	(United States) Miccosukee Indian Gaming Resort, Miami, Florida, U.S.	
49	Win	42–7	(United States) Abdul Muhaymin	UD	8	12 Jun 1998	(United States) Belle of Baton Rogue Casino, Baton Rouge, Louisiana, U.S.	
48	Loss	41–7	(Uzbekistan) Oleg Maskaev	TKO	7 (10)	27 Sep 1997	Circus, Moscow, Russia	
47	Win	41–6	(United States) James Warring	UD	10	1 May 1997	(United States) Convention Center, Asbury Park, New Jersey, U.S.	
46	Win	40–6	(United States) Samson Cohen	KO	1 (10), 2:53	6 Mar 1997	(United States) Hyatt Regency Hotel, Baltimore, Maryland, U.S.	
45	Loss	39–6	(United States) Craig Petersen	TKO	8 (10), 2:46	3 Nov 1996	Tokyo Bay Hall, Urayasu, Chiba, Japan	
44	Win	39–5	(United States) Bryant Smith	KO	6 (10), 2:19	6 Feb 1996	(United States) 69th Regiment Armory, New York City, New York, U.S.	
43	Win	38–5	(United States) Terry Anderson	KO	1 (10), 2:37	2 Dec 1995	(United States) The Grand Hotel, Atlantic City, New Jersey, U.S.	
42	Win	37–5	(United States) Darren Hayden	RTD	5 (10), 3:00	3 Oct 1995	(United States) Foxwoods Resort, Mashantucket, Connecticut, U.S.	
41	Win	36–5	(United States) Jesse Ferguson	UD	10	8 Aug 1995	(United States) Spotlight 29 Casino, Coachella, California, U.S.	
40	Win	35–5	(United States) Tyrone Evans	TKO	4 (10), 1:47	9 May 1995	(United States) Aladdin Theater, Las Vegas, Nevada, U.S.	
39	Win	34–5	(United States) Tyrone Evans	TKO	6 (8), 1:56	10 Sep 1994	(United States) Flamingo Hotel Laughlin, Nevada, U.S.	
38	Win	33–5	(United States) Derrick Roddy	TKO	6 (10), 2:45	2 Jul 1994	(United States) Convention Center, South Padre Island, Texas, U.S.	
37	Loss	32–5	(United States) Evander Holyfield	UD	12	26 Jun 1993	(United States) Convention Center, Atlantic City, New Jersey, U.S.	
36	Win	32–4	(United States) Rick Enis	TKO	3 (10)	26 Apr 1993	(United States) Rosemont, Illinois, U.S.	
35	Win	31–4	(United States) Jerry Halstead	TKO	7 (10)	6 Feb 1993	(United States) Madison Square Garden, New York City, New York, U.S.	
34	Win	30–4	(United States) Marshall Tillman	TKO	10 (10), 0:31	25 Aug 1992	(United States) Harrah's Resort, Atlantic City, New Jersey, U.S.	
33	Win	29–4	(United States) Paul Poirier	TKO	3 (10), 1:04	24 Jul 1992	(United States) Friar Tuck Inn, Catskill, New York, U.S.	
32	Loss	28–4	(United States) George Foreman	MD	10	11 Apr 1992	(United States) Thomas & Mack Center, Las Vegas, Nevada, U.S.	
31	Win	28–3	(United States) Joey Christjohn	TKO	3 (10)	22 Feb 1992	Katowice, Poland	
30	Loss	27–3	(United States) Michael Moorer	TKO	4 (10), 1:54	27 Jul 1991	(United States) Scope Arena, Norfolk, Virginia, U.S.	
29	Win	27–2	(United States) Danny Wofford	RTD	4 (10), 3:00	11 Apr 1991	(United States) Civic ArenaSaint Joseph, Missouri, U.S.	
28	Loss	26–2	(United States) Mike Tyson	TKO	1 (10), 2:27	8 Dec 1990	(United States) Convention Center, Atlantic City, New Jersey, U.S.	
27	Win	26–1	(United States) Jamie Howe	TKO	7 (10), 0:32	3 Jul 1990	(United States) Kusher's Club, Monticello, New York, U.S.	
26	Win	25–1	(United States) Mark Young	RTD	5 (10), 3:00	25 May 1990	(United States) Trump Plaza Hotel, Atlantic City, New Jersey, U.S.	
25	Loss	24–1	(United States) Evander Holyfield	TKO	8 (12), 2:51	4 Nov 1989	(United States) Trump Plaza Hotel, Atlantic City, New Jersey, U.S.	For WBC Continental Americas heavyweight title
24	Win	24–0	(United States) Terry Armstrong	TKO	3 (10), 1:25	10 Aug 1989	(United States) Felt Forum, New York City, New York, U.S.	
23	Win	23–0	(Mexico) Fernando Montes	TKO	2 (10), 1:50	13 Jul 1989	(United States) Felt Forum, New York City, New York, U.S.	
22	Win	22–0	(United States) Michael Johnson	TKO	2 (10)	29 Apr 1989	Pegasus Hotel, Kingston, Jamaica	
21	Win	21–0	(United States) Arthel Lawhorne	TKO	4 (10), 2:07	30 Mar 1989	(United States) Felt Forum, New York City, New York, U.S.	
20	Win	20–0	(United States) David Jaco	TKO	1 (10)	18 Feb 1989	Sportcsarnok Hall, Budapest, Hungary	
19	Win	19–0	(United States) Eddie Richardson	KO	3 (10), 1:11	15 Dec 1988	(United States) Felt Forum, New York City, New York, U.S.	
18	Win	18–0	(United States) Lorenzo Canady	TKO	4 (10), 2:14	27 Oct 1988	(United States) Felt Forum, New York City, New York, U.S.	
17	Win	17–0	(United States) Tim Adams	TKO	1 (8), 1:53	23 Sep 1988	(United States) Gleason's Arena, Brooklyn, New York, U.S.	
16	Win	16–0	(Canada) Conroy Nelson	TKO	2 (8)	31 Jul 1988	(United States) Felt Forum, New York City, New York, U.S.	
15	Win	15–0	(United States) Calvin Sherman	TKO	1 (8), 2:32	14 Jul 1988	(United States) Felt Forum, New York City, New York, U.S.	
14	Win	14–0	(United States) Aaron Brown	TKO	1 (10), 1:58	26 May 1988	(United States) Park Plaza Hotel, Boston, Massachusetts, U.S.	
13	Win	13–0	(United States) Jim Berry	TKO	1 (8), 2:31	20 May 1988	(United States) Gleason's Arena, Brooklyn, New York, U.S.	
12	Win	12–0	(United States) Mike Jones	KO	4 (8), 2:42	12 May 1988	(United States) Felt Forum, New York City, New York, U.S.	
11	Win	11–0	(United States) Harry Terrell	KO	1 (8), 2:46	25 Mar 1988	(United States) Felt Forum, New York City, New York, U.S.	
10	Win	10–0	(United States) George Garza	TKO	2 (6), 1:39	4 Feb 1988	(United States) Felt Forum, New York City, New York, U.S.	
9	Win	9–0	(United States) John Morton	TKO	4 (6)	17 Dec 1987	(United States) Felt Forum, New York City, New York, U.S.	
8	Win	8–0	(United States) Juan Quintana	TKO	2 (8)	27 Nov 1987	(United States) Veterans Memorial Coliseum, New Haven, Connecticut, U.S.	
7	Win	7–0	(United States) Ernie Poole	TKO	1 (?), 2:16	20 Nov 1987	(United States) Cobo Hall, Detroit, Michigan, U.S.	
6	Win	6–0	(United States) Jimmy Harrison	TKO	2 (6), 0:40	27 Oct 1987	(United States) Felt Forum, New York City, New York, U.S.	
5	Win	5–0	(United States) Tim Morrison	TKO	2 (6), 0:54	1 Oct 1987	(United States) Felt Forum, New York City, New York, U.S.	
4	Win	4–0	(United States) Dennis Cain	TKO	2 (4), 1:08	6 Aug 1987	(United States) Felt Forum, New York City, New York, U.S.	
3	Win	3–0	(United States) Jim Little	KO	1 (4), 2:20	18 Jun 1987	(United States) Felt Forum, New York City, New York, U.S.	
2	Win	2–0	(United States) Eric Mitchell	TKO	3 (4)	7 May 1987	(United States) Felt Forum, New York City, New York, U.S.	
1	Win	1–0	(United States) James Walker	TKO	3 (4), 2:13	6 Sep 1986	(United States) Las Vegas Hilton, Las Vegas, Nevada, U.S.	

== Personal life ==
Alex Stewart is survived by his wife, Angella Stewart, and his daughter, Ajay-Tenille Stewart, who was born in 1985.
