= Kim Dong-kil =

South Korean boxer (born 1963)

Medal record

Representing South Korea

Men's Boxing

World Amateur Championships
Silver medal – second place	Munich 1982	Light Welterweight

Asian Games
Gold medal – first place	New Delhi 1982	Light Welterweight
Gold medal – first place	Seoul 1986	Welterweight

Asian Amateur Championships
Silver medal – second place	Bombay 1980	Lightweight
Gold medal – first place	Seoul 1982	Light Welterweight

World Cup
Bronze medal – third place	1985 Seoul	Welterweight

Kim Dong-kil (Korean: 김동길; Hanja: 金東吉; born May 19, 1963, in Damyang, Jeollanam-do, South Korea) is a former South Korean amateur boxer.

== Career ==
Kim started garnering attention in May 1982 when he won the light welterweight silver medal at the World Amateur Boxing Championship held in Munich, West Germany. In July 1982, he won the gold medal at the Asian Amateur Boxing Championships with an RSC-2 win over future Olympic silver medalist Dhawee Umponmaha in the final.

Due to the Soviet bloc boycott of the 1984 Los Angeles Olympics, Kim was considered one of the top gold medal favourites in the light welterweight boxing tournament of the Olympics. In the tourney, he easily advanced to the quarterfinals and went on to face Jerry Page of United States. He lost the bout in a 4–1 decision.

He didn't turn pro, and retired after winning his second Asian Games gold medal in the 1986 Asian Games.

== Post career ==
After retirement, Kim earned a master's degree at Korea National Sport University. He is currently a member of the Korean Teachers & Education Workers' Union, serving as a junior high school teacher in Gwangju.

== Results ==
1982 World Championships
Event	Round	Result	Opponent	Score
Light Welterweight	First	bye		
Light Welterweight	Second	Win	(Tunisia) Mohsen Belkhir	KO 1
Light Welterweight	Quarterfinal	Win	(Turkey) Ali Cukur	4-1
Light Welterweight	Semifinal	Win	(Sweden) Shadrah Odhiambo	4-1
Light Welterweight	Final	Loss	(Cuba) Carlos Garcia	0-5

1984 Summer Olympics
Event	Round	Result	Opponent	Score
Light Welterweight	First	bye		
Light Welterweight	Second	Win	(Tanzania) Juma Bugingo	RSC 2
Light Welterweight	Third	Win	(Norway) Javid Aslam	5-0
Light Welterweight	Quarterfinal	Loss	(United States) Jerry Page	1-4
