= Clifton Charleswell =

Virgin Islands boxer (born 1961)

Personal information
- Nationality: American Virgin Islander
- Born: May 26, 1961 (age 63)

Sport
- Sport: Boxing

Clifton Charleswell (born May 26, 1961) is a former boxer who represented the United States Virgin Islands. He competed in the men's light welterweight event at the 1984 Summer Olympics. At the 1984 Summer Olympics, he lost to David Griffiths of Great Britain.

Charleswell also represented the United States Virgin Islands at the 1979 and 1983 Pan American Games.
