= Evander Holyfield vs. Henry Tillman =

Boxing match

The St. Valentine's Day Massacre
- Date: February 14, 1987
- Venue: Bally's Reno, Reno, Nevada, U.S.
- Title(s) on the line: WBA cruiserweight title

Tale of the tape
Boxer	Evander Holyfield	Henry Tillman
Nickname	"The Real Deal"	
Hometown	Atlanta, Georgia, U.S.	Los Angeles, California, U.S.
Pre-fight record	13–0 (9 KO)	14–1 (10 KO)
Age	24 years, 3 months	26 years, 6 months
Height	6 ft 1 in (185 cm)	6 ft 2 in (188 cm)
Weight	188 1/2 lb (86 kg)	189 lb (86 kg)
Style	Orthodox	Orthodox
Recognition	WBA; Cruiserweight Champion; The Ring; No. 1 Ranked Cruiserweight	WBA; No 1 Ranked Cruiserweight; The Ring; No. 5 Ranked Cruiserweight; 1984 Olympic Heavyweight Gold Medallist

Result
- Holyfield defeated Tillman by 7th round TKO

Evander Holyfield vs. Henry Tillman, billed as "The St. Valentine's Day Massacre", was a professional boxing match contested on February 14, 1987, for the WBA cruiserweight championship.

== Background ==
Evander Holyfield had defeated Dwight Muhammad Qawi via split decision in July 1986 to capture the WBA cruiserweight title, the first world title of his career. The first defense of Holyfield's title was announced to be against his 1984 Olympic teammate and gold medalist Henry Tillman, who like Holyfield, had turned pro in late 1984 and become a top prospect in the cruiserweight division, having already won NABF cruiserweight title and sporting a 14–1 record with the only blemish on his professional record being a close decision loss to Bert Cooper. Before facing Tillman, Holyfield first took a non-title tuneup fight in December 1986 against Mike Brothers (after his previously announced opponent Marcos Geraldo withdrew), easily defeating him by third-round knockout.

== The fight ==
The fight would prove to be a mismatch as Holyfield would have little trouble beating Tillman, knocking him down four times during the course of the bout. After a relatively close first round (which one judge had winning, which would prove to be the only round Tillman would win on any of the three scorecards), Holyfield dropped Tillman early in the second with a left hook. After Tillman arose and took the mandatory standing eight count, he charged at Holyfield, attempting to trade punches with him though Holyfield continued to pepper Tillman with powerful body shots throughout the round, though Tillman survived the round. Holyfield would continue to dominate Tillman and in round 7, Holyfield would land an uppercut followed by a left–right uppercut that dropped Tillman to the canvas. Tillman would again arise and continued though Holyfield continued his attack and soon sent Tillman down again with another left–right combination, though Tillman would answer the 10-count at nine. Holyfield quickly attacked Tillman with two left hooks that dropped Tillman for the third time in the round, with the three-knockdown rule in effect, the fight was immediately stopped and Holyfield was named the winner by technical knockout at 1:43 of round 7.

== Aftermath ==
This would be Tillman's only shot at a world title before he retired in 1992.

== Fight card ==
Confirmed bouts:

Weight Class	Weight		vs.		Method	Round	Time	Notes
Cruiserweight	190 lb	Evander Holyfield (c)	def.	Henry Tillman	TKO	7/15		^{Note 1}
Cruiserweight	190 lb	Andre McCall	def.	Jim Ashard	MD	8/8
Lightweight	135 lb	Mike Grow	def.	Leo Benitez	UD	6/6

^Note 1 For WBA Cruiserweight title.

== Broadcasting ==
Country	Broadcaster
United Kingdom	BBC
United States	ABC

Preceded by vs. Mike Brothers	Evander Holyfield's bouts 14 February 1987	Succeeded by vs. Rickey Parkey
Preceded by vs. Stanley Ross	Henry Tillman's bouts 14 February 1987	Succeeded by vs. Woody Clark
