= Lisiate =

Lisiate is a given name. Notable people with the given name include:

- Lisiate ʻAkolo, Tongan politician
- Lisiate Fa'aoso (born 1983), Tongan rugby union footballer
- Lisiate Lavulo (1961–2018), Tongan boxer
- Lisiate Tafa (born 1983), Tongan rugby union footballer
