= Henry Milligan =

American boxer

Henry "Hammerin' Hank" Milligan is an American former professional boxer. His highest achievement came in amateur boxing, when he was ranked #9 heavyweight in the world by the AIBA in February 1984 (being the only American to get into the dozen,) prior to his knockout loss at the hands of young Mike Tyson, then a relatively unknown to the world boxer from Catskill, New York.

== School sports ==
Milligan was a 1981 graduate of Princeton University. He was a defensive back in football, a third baseman in baseball and a wrestler who often wrestled in the highest weight class, despite being only about 5 feet 11 inches, 185 pounds (he would frequently wrestle and defeat 250-pounders, and once wrestled and defeated a 325-pounder in the NCAAs). Milligan earned ten varsity letters, an all-time university record. He was an All-American in wrestling and was Princeton's 1981 Senior Scholar-Athlete of the Year, which is the university's highest undergraduate honor. He later earned an M.B.A. degree from New York University.

In a game against St. John's University, Henry broke up the no-hitter of future Cy Young Award winner Frank Viola, who pitched in the major leagues for 15 years. The New York Mets offered him a minor league contract after his college graduation from Princeton.

Prior to his college graduation, he never boxed competitively, nor did he even train as a boxer. He claims that the only boxing he did before graduating from college was with his brother Mike in their parents' basement when growing up, in which they used rags to cover their hands.

He went to A.I. du Pont High School in Greenville, Delaware. Milligan is now the head coach of the Varsity wrestling team at Wilmington Christian School in Hockessin, Delaware.

== Amateur career ==
After college, Milligan worked as an engineer at the Edgemoor Power Plant of Delmarva Power and Light Company in Wilmington, Delaware, not far from where he grew up. At that time, he decided to try his hand at boxing. For that reason he came to Wilmington's West Center City Warriors, where he was trained by John Thornton.

Despite having no prior background in boxing, Milligan had an outstanding amateur career, and in 1983 he won the National AAU Heavyweight Championship. Being a white, Ivy League-educated boxer attracted a lot of attention to him, and he was featured in numerous newspaper and magazine articles nationwide, including People Magazine and Sports Illustrated. He also defeated Henry Tillman, the 1984 Olympic Heavyweight Gold Medalist, in the 1983 National finals in Colorado Springs, Colorado.

He entered the 1984 U.S. Olympic trials seeded first in the 201 pound class, despite weighing only 184 pounds, but lost in the semi-finals to 17-year-old Mike Tyson on June 9, 1984. Milligan was leading on points when Tyson stopped him in the second round.

His manager was Charlie Messina.

Wesley Watson, who lived on Washington Street before joining the Army, came to the West Center City Community Center one night and sparred against Milligan," Messina said.

=== Highlights ===
Local match-up (201 lbs), October 1981 (debut):

- Defeated Gary Wright KO 1

Local match-up (201 lbs), March 1982:

- Defeated Tyrone Armstrong RSC 3

Pennsylvania Golden Gloves (201 lbs), Zembo Mosque, Harrisburg, Pennsylvania, March 1982:

- Defeated Clinton Barnes RSC 1 (0:55)

National Golden Gloves (201 lbs), Kansas City, Missouri, March 1982:

- 1/16: Defeated Michael Arms RSC
- 1/8: Defeated Bryan Westmoreland RSC
- 1/4: Defeated Orlin Norris
- 1/2: Lost to Mike Dennard by split decision, 2–3 (Milligan won the Sportsmanship Award of the tournament)

Local match-up (201 lbs), Resorts International Hotel & Casino, Atlantic City, New Jersey, 1982:

- Defeated Ernie Singleton by decision

Mid-Atlantic ABF Championships (201 lbs), Brandywine Club, Chadds Ford, Pennsylvania, October 1982:

- 1/2: Defeated Sam Green (4 rds)
- Finals: Defeated Ernie Singleton RSC 3

AAU Region #2 Championships (201 lbs), Hazlet, New Jersey, November 1982:

- Finals: Defeated n/a

United States National Championships (201 lbs), Indianapolis, Indiana, December 1982:

- 1/8: Defeated Loi Faateete RSC 2
- 1/4: Defeated Joey Christjohn KO 3
- 1/2: Lost to Richard Johnson by split decision, 2–3 (Milligan suffered a broken nose from an accidental headbutt; Johnson knocked down in the 1st rd; Johnson was given a standing eight count in the 2nd rd)

Sweden–USA Duals (201 lbs), Stockholm, Sweden, January 1983:

- Defeated Jack Johnsen (Sweden) RSC 2

Sweden–USA Duals (201 lbs), Gothenburg, Sweden, January 1983:

- Defeated Nasser Hassanzadeh (Sweden) RSC 1

Norway–USA Duals (201 lbs), 1983:

- Defeated Magne Havnaa in Oslo. Havnaa would later be WBO Cruiserweight world champion as a pro.

National Sports Festival (201 lbs), U.S. Olympic Training Center, Colorado Springs, Colorado, June 1983:

- 1/2: Lost to Henry Tillman RSC 2

AAU Region #2 Championships (201 lbs), Radisson Hotel, Wilmington, Delaware, October 1983:

- Defeated Michael Bentt by split decision, 3–2

(gold) United States National Championships (201 lbs), Colorado Springs, Colorado, November 1983:

- 1/8: Defeated Henry Tillman by split decision, 3–2
- 1/4: Defeated Al Evans KO 1
- 1/2: Defeated Avery Rawls by unanimous decision, 5–0
- Finals: Defeated Olian Alexander by unanimous decision, 5–0 (Milligan was named Outstanding Boxer of the tournament among the heavier weights)

USA–Yugoslavia Duals (201 lbs), Shreveport, Louisiana, January 1984:

- Defeated n/a

Yugoslavia–USA Duals (201 lbs), Rijeka, Yugoslavia, February 1983:

- Lost to Xhevdet Peci (Yugoslavia) DQ 2

Yugoslavia–USA Duals (201 lbs), Borovo, Yugoslavia, February 1983:

- Defeated Milenko Andrić (Yugoslavia) KO 1

National Olympic Trials (201 lbs), Tarrant County Convention Center, Fort Worth, Texas, June 1984:

- 1/4: Defeated Charles Dread RSC 1 (2:32)
- 1/2: Lost to Michael Tyson RSC 2

He ended his amateur career with a record of 41 wins (31 knockouts,) 6 losses.

== Professional career ==
Milligan turned pro in 1985 and began his career with a promising string of 11 victories, but then lost a couple of bouts, retiring in 1986. He launched two comebacks in which he fought in local bouts, and fought for the WBO Cruiserweight Championship of the World in December, 1993 in Aspen, Colorado, losing on a cut in the eighth round, and retired permanently in 1998.

== Professional boxing record ==
21 fights	17 wins	3 losses
By knockout	15	3
By decision	2	0
Draws	1	

== Outside the ring ==
Milligan has appeared in ten national television commercials and a feature film with Robert De Niro and Jessica Lange, titled Night and the City. He is the president of the Elsmere, Delaware, Boxing Club, a civic member of the Mary Campbell Center for Disabled Adults and the Delaware Foundation for Retarded Children. In 1993, Milligan was inducted into the Delaware Sports Museum and Hall of Fame. Milligan is now the head coach of the varsity wrestling team at Wilmington Christian School in Hockessin, Delaware.

He is a member of Mensa International, which requires that all members have IQs that place them in the top 2% of the population, and the Triple Nine Society (99.9% IQ).

Preceded by Ricky Womack	United States Amateur Heavyweight Champion; 1983	Succeeded by Michael Bentt
