= Angelo Musone =

Italian boxer (born 1963)

Medal record

Men's boxing

Representing Italy

Olympic Games
Bronze medal – third place	1984 Los Angeles	Heavyweight

World Cup
Bronze medal – third place	1983 Rome	Heavyweight

Mediterranean Games
Silver medal – second place	1983 Casablanca	Heavyweight

Angelo Musone (born March 1, 1963) is an Italian former boxer, who won the Heavyweight bronze medal at the 1984 Summer Olympics. He was born in Marcianise.

== Olympic results ==
- Defeated James Omondi (Kenya) 5-0
- Defeated Kaliq Singh (India) walk-over
- Defeated Håkan Brock (Sweden) 5-0
- Lost to Henry Tillman (United States) 0-5

== Career ==
In the Los Angeles Olympics, after American Henry Tillman was controversially awarded their semi-final contest on a 5-0 decision, the defeated Musone was cheered by the American fans as he left the ring in tears. British TV commentator Harry Carpenter was highly critical of the decision saying "Musone won that, and he won it well" and "if that is correct judging then I don't know what I'm talking about. I've never seen a man so shabbily treated in an Olympic boxing tournament".

Musone began his professional career undefeated in 18 fights, including a victory over a faded Leon Spinks in 1987. Later that year, Musone was defeated by KO by journeyman Steve Mormino, who dropped Musone twice in the sixth round, ending the fight. This was Musone's last pro fight. Musone later became a professional boxing referee and judge.
