= Jean Duarte =

French boxer

Personal information
- Nationality: French
- Born: 20 August 1965 (age 59)

Sport
- Sport: Boxing

Jean Duarte (born 20 August 1965) is a French boxer. He competed in the men's light welterweight event at the 1984 Summer Olympics.
