= Jim McDonnell (boxer) =

English boxer

Personal information
- Born: James Martin McDonnell; 12 September 1960 (age 65) London, England
- Height: 5 ft 7 in (170 cm)
- Weight: Featherweight, super featherweight

Boxing career

Boxing record
- Total fights: 30
- Wins: 26
- Win by KO: 12
- Losses: 4
Medal record
Boxing
Representing England
Commonwealth Games
Silver medal – second place	1982 Brisbane	lightweight

Jim McDonnell (born 12 September 1960) is a British former boxer who won the European featherweight title and twice fought for World titles at super featherweight.

== Career ==
=== Amateur ===
He represented England and won a silver medal in the lightweight division, at the 1982 Commonwealth Games in Brisbane, Queensland, Australia. He won the 1982 Amateur Boxing Association British lightweight title, when boxing out of the St. Pancras ABC.

=== Professional ===
Born in London and a caretaker working for Camden Council outside of boxing, McDonnell made his professional debut in March 1983 with a points win over Phil Duke. In March 1985 he beat Clyde Ruan to take the BBBofC Southern Area featherweight title, a fight that was also a British title eliminator.

The British title fight didn't materialise but in November 1985 he faced Jose Luis Vicho for the vacant European featherweight title; McDonnell stopped the Spaniard in the fourth round to become European champion. He successfully defended the European title in July 1986 against Salvatore Bottiglieri, taking a points decision.

By 1988 he had moved up to super featherweight and still with a 100% record from 24 fights fought South African Brian Mitchell for the latter's WBA super featherweight title in November. The fight went the full twelve rounds but Mitchell won via a comfortable unanimous decision, the first defeat of McDonnell's career.

McDonnell returned in March 1989 with a points win over Benjie Marquez, and in May of that year faced Barry McGuigan at the G-Mex Centre, Manchester. Although the underdog, McDonnell dominated the fight and won after it was stopped in the fourth round due to a cut over McGuigan's right eye. The defeat effectively ended McGuigan's career.

In November 1989 McDonnell got a second shot at a World title when he challenged for Azumah Nelson's WBC super featherweight title at the Royal Albert Hall. In a very competitive fight, McDonnell was stopped in the twelfth and final round after his right eye was swollen shut in the previous round.

He returned in September 1990 when he was stopped by future WBF World champion Kenny Vice in the fourth round. After more than seven years out of the ring, and at the age of 38, he returned in February 1998 against Peter Feher, losing a six-round points decision.

== Personal life ==
After retiring from boxing he worked as a painter and decorator, ran a gym in Camden, and became a trainer, most notably working with Danny Williams and James DeGale. He also ran the London Marathon several times, his best time 2 hours 49 minutes.
