= Jerry Page =

American boxer

Personal information
- Born: January 15, 1961 (age 65) Columbus, Ohio, U.S.
Medal record
Men's boxing
Representing the United States
Olympic Games
Gold medal – first place	1984 Los Angeles	Light welterweight
Pan American Games
Silver medal – second place	1983 Caracas	Light welterweight

Jerry Louis Page (born January 15, 1961, in Columbus, Ohio) is an American boxer who won the light welterweight gold medal at the 1984 Summer Olympics. A year earlier he won a silver medal at the 1983 Pan American Games.

== Amateur career ==
Jerry Page, an American boxer, was the gold medalist in the 139 lbs classification (light welterweight) at the 1984 Los Angeles Olympics.

=== 1984 Olympic results ===
- Round of 64: bye
- Round of 32: Defeated Helmut Gertel (West Germany) 5-0
- Round of 16: Defeated Ostavio Robles (Mexico) 5-0
- Quarterfinal: Defeated Kim Dong-Kil (South Korea) 4-1
- Semifinal: Defeated Mirko Puzović (Yugoslavia) 5-0
- Final: Defeated Dhawee Umponmaha (Thailand) 5-0 (won gold medal)

== Professional career ==
Page began his professional career in 1985 and won his first 8 bouts before being beaten in a decision loss to Terrence Alli in 1988. This loss signaled the beginning of an early end for Page, who lost a decision to Frankie Randall in 1989 and then retired in 1990 with a career record of 11–4–0.
