= Lotfi Belkhir =

Tunisian boxer (born 1961)

Personal information
- Nationality: Algérien
- Born: 20 October 1961 (age 64)

Sport
- Sport: Boxing

Lotfi Belkhir (born 20 October 1961) is a Algérien boxer. He competed in the men's light welterweight event at the 1984 Summer Olympics.
