= Peter Hanlon (boxer) =

British boxer

Personal information
- Nationality: British
- Born: 13 April 1959 (age 67) Dublin

Sport
- Sport: Boxing
Medal record
Boxing
Representing England
Commonwealth Games
| Silver medal – second place | 1982 Brisbane | featherweight |

Peter Joseph Hanlon (born 13 April 1959 in Dublin) is a retired British boxer.

== Boxing career ==
Hanlon won the 1979 and 1981 Amateur Boxing Association British featherweight titles, when boxing out of the Gloucester ABC.

He competed in the men's featherweight event at the 1980 Summer Olympics. At the Olympics, he beat Antonio Esparragoza of Venezuela, before losing to Viktor Rybakov of the Soviet Union in the last 16.

He represented England and won a silver medal in the featherweight division, at the 1982 Commonwealth Games in Brisbane, Queensland, Australia.
