= Anthony Rose (boxer) =

Jamaican boxer (born 1965)

Personal information
- Nationality: Jamaican
- Born: 27 April 1965 (age 59)

Sport
- Sport: Boxing

Anthony Rose (born 27 April 1965) is a Jamaican boxer. He competed in the men's light welterweight event at the 1984 Summer Olympics, losing to William Galiwango of Uganda.
