= Hassan Lahmar =

Moroccan boxer

Personal information
- Nationality: Moroccan

Sport
- Sport: Boxing

Hassan Lahmar is a Moroccan boxer. He competed in the men's light welterweight event at the 1984 Summer Olympics.
