= Miguel Mosna =

Argentine boxer

Miguel Antonio Mosna
Personal information
- Born: June 7, 1962 (age 64) Merlo, Buenos Aires, Argentina
- Weight: Light heavyweight

Boxing career

Boxing record
- Total fights: 18
- Wins: 11
- Win by KO: 11
- Losses: 6
- Draws: 1
Medal record
Men's amateur boxing
Representing Argentina
Pan American Games
Bronze medal – third place	1983 Caracas	Light heavyweight

Miguel Antonio Mosna (born June 7, 1962) is a light heavyweight Argentine boxer who fought in various events around the world. The bulk of his career has been in Argentina but he has also fought in Las Vegas, Niger, South Africa, Brazil, Venezuela and other countries. He retired from boxing with a total of:

- 11 fights won by K.O
- 6 fights lost by K.O
- 1 fight ending with a draw

He is recognized among such famous Argentine boxers as Juan Roldan, Oscar Bonavena and Carlos Monzón.
