= Stefan Sjöstrand =

Swedish boxer

Personal information
- Nationality: Swedish
- Born: 8 April 1962 (age 62); Stockholm, Sweden

Sport
- Sport: Boxing

Stefan Sjöstrand (born 8 April 1962) is a Swedish boxer. He competed in the men's light welterweight event at the 1984 Summer Olympics.
