= Rushdy Armanios =

Egyptian boxer (born 1963)

Personal information
- Nationality: Egyptian
- Born: 8 September 1963 (age 61)

Sport
- Sport: Boxing

Rushdy Armanios (born 8 September 1963) is an Egyptian boxer. He competed in the men's light welterweight event at the 1984 Summer Olympics.
