= Umesh Maskey =

Nepalese boxer

Personal information
- Nationality: Nepalese
- Born: Kathmandu, Nepal

Sport
- Sport: Boxing

Umesh Maskey is a Nepalese boxer. He competed in the men's light welterweight event at the 1984 Summer Olympics.
