= Ray Gilbody =

English boxer

Personal information
- Nationality: British
- Born: 21 March 1960 (age 66) Southport, England
- Height: 5 ft 6 in (168 cm)
- Weight: Bantamweight

Boxing career

Boxing record
- Total fights: 16
- Wins: 11
- Win by KO: 8
- Losses: 4
- Draws: 1
Medal record
Boxing
Representing England
Commonwealth Games
Bronze medal – third place	1982 Brisbane	bantamweight

Ray Gilbody (born 21 March 1960) is a British former boxer who after a successful amateur career held the British bantamweight title between 1985 and 1987, and fought for the European title twice in 1986.

== Amateur career ==
Born in Southport and raised in Warrington, Gilbody had a successful career as an amateur in which he won three national schools titles, several other junior titles and three senior ABA titles — at flyweight in 1979 and at bantamweight in 1980 and 1982. He fought with the Great British boxing team that was captained by his older brother George Gilbody at the 1980 Summer Olympics in Moscow, and in 1982 he represented England and won a bronze medal at the Commonwealth Games in Brisbane, Queensland, Australia. In all he represented his country over 50 times.

== 1980 Olympic results ==
- Round of 64: bye
- Round of 32: defeated Joao Luis de Almeida (Angola) by decision, 5-0
- Round of 32: lost to Daniel Zaragoza (Mexico) by decision, 1-4

== Professional career ==
He made his professional debut in March 1983, stopping George Bailey in the second round at the Royal Albert Hall. In December, in his fifth fight, he challenged for John Farrell's BBBofC Southern Area bantamweight title, the fight ending a draw. In April 1984 he stopped Dave George in a British title eliminator, but suffered a setback in February 1985 when he was forced to retire against Sandy Odanga with a suspected dislocated wrist.

He won the British title in June 1985, beating defending champion John Feeney on points. He successfully defended the title in November, stopping Farrell in the eighth round.

In February 1986 he unsuccessfully challenged for Ciro De Leva's European title in Cosenza, losing a narrow decision, with one judge scoring the fight a draw. When the title became vacant, he faced Antoine Montero in Paris in October, the Spanish-born Frenchman stopping him in the first round.

Gilbody made a second defence of his British title in February 1987, Billy Hardy taking the title with a third round stoppage. This was Gilbody's final fight.

Gilbody subsequently worked as a boxing coach in Warrington.

Gilbody's brother George was also a successful amateur, who represented Britain at Olympic and Commonwealth Games.
