= Clyde McIntosh =

Retired British boxer and boxing trainer

Personal information
- Nationality: United Kingdom
- Born: 1958 St. Thomas, Jamaica

Sport
- Sport: Boxing
Medal record
Boxing
Representing England
Commonwealth Games
Bronze medal – third place	1982 Brisbane	light-welterweight

Clyde McIntosh (born 1958) is a retired British boxer and boxing trainer.

== Boxing career ==
He represented England and won a bronze medal in the 63.5 kg light-welterweight division, at the 1982 Commonwealth Games in Brisbane, Queensland, Australia. Bell Green Club fought a local Rob Shenton who blooded his nose, the fight is not spoken about

McIntosh boxed for the Bell Green ABC and was the ABA light-welterweight runner-up to Tony Adams in 1982.
