= Steve Larrimore =

Bahamian boxer (born 1963)

Personal information
- Nationality: Bahamian
- Born: 14 February 1963 (age 63) Nassau, Bahamas
- Weight: lightweight/light welterweight/welterweight/light middleweight

Boxing career

Boxing record
- Total fights: 52
- Wins: 25
- Win by KO: 19
- Losses: 27
Medal record
Men's amateur boxing
Representing Bahamas
Commonwealth Games
| Bronze medal – third place | 1982 Brisbane | Lightweight |
Central American and Caribbean Games
| Bronze medal – third place | 1982 Havana | Lightweight |

Steve Larrimore (born 14 February 1963) is a Bahamian former professional boxer who competed from 1984 to 2001. As an amateur, he competed at the 1979 Pan American Games, 1982 Central American and Caribbean Games, 1982 Commonwealth Games, the 1983 Pan American Games and at the 1984 Summer Olympics in Los Angeles, losing to eventual bronze medal winner Mirko Puzović of Yugoslavia, and as a professional won the World Boxing Council (WBC) Continental Americas lightweight title, and Commonwealth light welterweight title, and was a challenger for the United States Boxing Association (USBA) lightweight title against Freddie Pendleton, International Boxing Organization (IBO) light welterweight title against Israel Cardona, and National Boxing Association (NBA) Junior Middleweight Title against Hasan Al, his professional fighting weight varied from lightweight to light middleweight.
