= Pichit Burapavong =

Thai sports shooter

Personal information
- Nationality: Thai
- Born: 5 May 1944 (age 80)

Sport
- Sport: Sports shooting

Pichit Burapavong (Thai: พิชิต บูรพวงศ์; born 5 May 1944) is a Thai business executive and former sports shooter. He is chairman of the board of Chin Huay and competed at the 1976 Summer Olympics and the 1984 Summer Olympics.
