= Leonard Makhanya =

Swazi boxer (born 1964)

Personal information
- Born: 9 August 1964 (age 61)
Medal record
Men's Boxing
Representing Eswatini
Commonwealth Games
Bronze medal – third place	1982 Brisbane	Light-flyweight
Silver medal – second place	1986 Edinburgh	Flyweight

Leonard Makhanya (born 9 August 1964) is a former Swaziland boxer. Makhanya competed at the 1984 Summer Olympics, where he was defeated by Pat Clinton of Great Britain in his first round match. He won a bronze medal at the 1982 Commonwealth Games as a light-flyweight and won a silver medal at the 1986 Commonwealth Games as a flyweight.
