= Mirko Puzović =

Serbian boxer

Medal record

Representing Yugoslavia

Men's Boxing

Olympic Games
Bronze medal – third place	1984 Los Angeles	Light Welterweight

World Amateur Championships
Bronze medal – third place	Munich 1982	Light Welterweight
Bronze medal – third place	Reno 1986	Light Welterweight

European Amateur Championships
Silver medal – second place	Tampere 1981	Light Welterweight
Silver medal – second place	Varna 1983	Light Welterweight
Bronze medal – third place	Budapest 1985	Light Welterweight

Mediterranean Games
Silver medal – second place	1983 Casablanca	Light Welterweight

Mirko Puzović (born April 24, 1956 in Aranđelovac, Serbia) is a retired boxer from Yugoslavia. At the 1984 Summer Olympics he won the bronze medal in the men's light welterweight division (– 63.5 kg). In the semifinals he was beaten by eventual winner Jerry Page of the United States. He did the same two years earlier at the World Championships in Munich, West Germany.

== Olympic results ==
- 1st round bye
- Defeated Denis Lambert (Canada) 5–0
- Defeated Steve Larrimore (Bahamas) 5–0
- Defeated Jean Mbereke (Cameroon) 5–0
- Lost to Jerry Page (United States) 0–5
