= Ikhlef Ahmed Hadj Allah =

Algerian boxer (born 1961)

Personal information
- Nationality: Algerian
- Born: 5 April 1961 (age 65)

Sport
- Sport: Boxing

Ikhlef Ahmed Hadj Allah (born 5 April 1961) is an Algerian boxer. He competed in the men's light welterweight event at the 1984 Summer Olympics.
