= Jimmy Price =

British boxer (born 1960)

Personal information
- Nationality: British (English)
- Born: 21 October 1960 (age 65) Liverpool, England

Sport
- Sport: Boxing
Medal record
Boxing
Representing England
Commonwealth Games
Gold medal – first place	1982 Brisbane	middleweight

James Price (born 21 October 1960) is a British retired boxer.

== Boxing career ==
Price represented England and won a gold medal in the 75 kg middleweight division, at the 1982 Commonwealth Games in Brisbane, Queensland, Australia.

Price was a southpaw and boxed for the Holy Name ABC in Fazakerley. He was the ABA light-middleweight champion in 1980 and the ABA middleweight champion in 1982.

He turned professional on 3 February 1983 and fought in 19 fights.
