= Dhawee Umponmaha =

Thai former professional Muay Thai fighter and amateur boxer

- Born: November 15, 1959 (age 66); Mueang Rayong, Rayong, Thailand
- Native name: ทวี อัมพรมหา
- Other names: Thawi Amphonmaha (RTGS)
- Nickname: Black Cotton (ไอ้สำลีดำ)
- Height: 171 cm (5 ft 7 in)
- Division: Featherweight; Lightweight; Light Welterweight; Welterweight
- Reach: 174 cm (69 in)
- Style: Muay Thai (Muay Mat); Boxing
- Stance: Orthodox
- Years active: c. 1973–1984

Other information
- Notable club: Osotspa

Dhawee Umponmaha (Thai: ทวี อัมพรมหา; born November 15, 1959), known professionally as Kaopong Sitichuchai (Thai: ขาวผ่อง สิทธิชูชัย), is a Thai former professional Muay Thai fighter and amateur boxer. He is a former Lumpinee Stadium Featherweight Champion and won a silver medal in boxing at the 1984 Summer Olympics in the Light Welterweight division.

He is the second Thai athlete to win a medal at the Summer Olympics, following Payao Poontarat (whose medal also came in boxing) at the 1976 Summer Olympics. He also holds the distinction of being the only fighter to have defeated the legendary Dieselnoi Chor Thanasukarn in Muay Thai rules by knockout.

== Biography ==
=== Early life and Muay Thai career ===
He is the third of six children. He started fighting at the age of 14 in his native province with Chucheep Chaimongkol as a trainer. In 1974, he traveled to Bangkok to fight for the first time at the major stadiums, Rajadamnern Stadium and Lumpinee Stadium. He won the Featherweight (57 kg or 126 lb) title of the Lumpinee Stadium and defended it for four years. He vacated the title to move up to a heavier division. He knocked out the legendary Dieselnoi Chor Thanasukarn.

=== Boxing ===
He then turned to amateur boxing due to Capt. Chanai Pongsupa's persuasion (Torsak Sasiprapa's father), training at Osotspa Club from 1981. He laso made the transition because he wanted to travel abroad. He was successful in many competitions such as the Thailand Championships which he won in 1983 and 1984, he obtained a silver medal in the 1982 Asian Games, a silver medal in the 1982 King's Cup and the gold medal in the 1983 Southeast Asian Games.

=== Retirement ===
After retirement, he worked as a public relations officer for Osotspa and as a secretary of Osotspa F.C. (currently Super Power Samut Prakan F.C.) in Thai Premier League. He also has his own cosmetic business.

== 1984 Olympic results ==
- Round of 64: Defeated Jaslal Pradhan (India) by decision, 5-0
- Round of 32: Defeated Charles Owiso (Kenya) by decision, 3-2
- Round of 16: Defeated Dave Griffiths (Great Britain) by decision, 4-1
- Quarterfinal: Defeated Jorge Maysonet (Puerto Rico) by decision, 5-0
- Semifinal: Defeated Mircea Fulger (Romania) by decision, 5-0
- Final: Lost to Jerry Page (United States) by decision, 0-5 (was awarded silver medal)

== Titles and accomplishments ==
- Lumpinee Stadium
  - 1978 Lumpinee Stadium Featherweight (126 lbs) Champion
- World Free-style Martial Arts
  - WFMA Welterweight (147 lbs) Champion

== Muay Thai record ==
Muay Thai Record
Date	Result	Opponent	Event	Location	Method	Round	Time
1984-01-05	Win	(Thailand) Krongsak Sakkasem	Rajadamnern Stadium	Bangkok, Thailand	Decision	5	3:00
1983-12-08	Win	(Thailand) Inseenoi Sor.Thanikul		Bangkok, Thailand	Decision	5	3:00
1983-11-03	Win	(Thailand) Jitti Kiatsuriya	Rajadamnern Stadium	Bangkok, Thailand	Decision	5	3:00
1983-04-23		(United States) Dave Johnston		Los Angeles, United States			
1983-02-17	Win	(Thailand) Fanta Attapong	Rajadamnern Stadium	Bangkok, Thailand	TKO	3	
1982-12-27	Loss	(Thailand) Samart Prasarnmit	Rajadamnern Stadium	Bangkok, Thailand	Decision	5	3:00
1982-11-15	Win	(Thailand) Jitti Kiatsuriya	Lumpinee Stadium	Bangkok, Thailand	Decision	5	3:00
1982-04-28	Win	(Japan) Seichi Nanjo	Rajadamnern Stadium - Chakri Dynasty Bicentenary	Bangkok, Thailand	KO (Punch)	1	1:15
Wins the WFMA World Welterweight (147 lbs) title.
1982-02-05	Loss	(Thailand) Paennoi Sakornphitak	Lumpinee Stadium	Bangkok, Thailand	Decision	5	3:00
1981-12-27	Loss	(Thailand) Samart Prasarnmit	Rajadamnern Stadium	Bangkok, Thailand	Decision	5	3:00
1981-09-22	Win	(Thailand) Sagat Petchyindee	Lumpinee Stadium	Bangkok, Thailand	TKO (Punches)	4	
1981-07-02	Loss	(Thailand) Nongkhai Sor.Prapatsorn	Rajadamnern Stadium	Bangkok, Thailand	Decision	5	3:00
1981-05-14	Win	(Thailand) Padejsuk Pitsanurachan	Rajadamnern Stadium	Bangkok, Thailand	Decision	5	3:00
1981-03-19	Win	(Thailand) Lakchart Sor.Prasartporn	Lumpinee Stadium	Bangkok, Thailand	KO	4	
1981-02-	Loss	(Thailand) Seksan Sor.Theppitak		Bangkok, Thailand	Decision	5	3:00
1981-01-09	Loss	(Thailand) Dieselnoi Chor Thanasukarn	Lumpinee Stadium	Bangkok, Thailand	Decision	5	3:00
For the vacant Lumpinee Stadium Lightweight (135 lbs) title.
1980-11-07	Loss	(Thailand) Nongkhai Sor.Prapatsorn	Lumpinee Stadium	Bangkok, Thailand	Decision	5	3:00
1980-09-26	Win	(Thailand) Dieselnoi Chor Thanasukarn	Lumpinee Stadium	Bangkok, Thailand	KO (Punches)	2	
1980-08-08	Win	(Thailand) Padejsuk Pitsanurachan	Lumpinee Stadium	Bangkok, Thailand	Decision	5	3:00
1980-07-08	Loss	(Thailand) Dieselnoi Chor Thanasukarn	Lumpinee Stadium	Bangkok, Thailand	KO (Knee to the head)	3	
For the Yodmuaythai trophy.
1980-05-03	Win	(Thailand) Wichannoi Porntawee		Rayong Province, Thailand	TKO	2	
1980-03-05	Win	(Thailand) Narongnoi Kiatbandit	Rajadamnern Stadium	Bangkok, Thailand	Decision	5	3:00
1980-01-22	Win	(Thailand) Raktae Muangsurin	Lumpinee Stadium	Bangkok, Thailand	TKO	3	
1979-12-07	Win	(Thailand) Nueasila Na Bankhod	Lumpinee Stadium	Bangkok, Thailand	Decision	5	3:00
1979-08-31	Loss	(Thailand) Kamlaiyok Kiatsompop		Bangkok, Thailand	Decision	5	3:00
1979-07-27	Win	(Thailand) Jitti Muangkhonkaen	Lumpinee Stadium	Bangkok, Thailand	Decision	5	3:00
1979-05-25	Loss	(Thailand) Ruengsak Porntawee	Lumpinee Stadium	Bangkok, Thailand	Decision	5	3:00
1979-04-03	Win	(Thailand) Jocky Sitkanpai	Lumpinee Stadium	Bangkok, Thailand	Decision	5	3:00
1979-03-03	Win	(Thailand) Pudpadnoi Worawut	Lumpinee Stadium	Bangkok, Thailand	Decision	5	3:00
1979-02-13	Win	(Thailand) Fahkaew Fairtex	Lumpinee Stadium	Bangkok, Thailand	Decision	5	3:00
1979-01-17	Loss	(Thailand) Nongkhai Sor.Prapatsorn	Lumpinee Stadium	Bangkok, Thailand	Decision	5	3:00
1978-12-14	Win	(Thailand) Maen Sahathai	Lumpinee Stadium	Bangkok, Thailand	Decision	5	3:00
1978-10-10	Loss	(Thailand) Sagat Petchyindee	Lumpinee Stadium	Bangkok, Thailand	KO (Punches)	4	
1978-08-11	Win	(Thailand) Ruengsak Porntawee	Lumpinee Stadium	Bangkok, Thailand	Decision	5	3:00
Wins the vacant Lumpinee Stadium Featherweight (126 lbs) title.
1978-06-13	Win	(Thailand) Nanfah Siharatdecho	Lumpinee Stadium	Bangkok, Thailand	KO	4	
1978-05-10	Win	(Thailand) Khunponnoi Kiatsuriya		Bangkok, Thailand	Decision	5	3:00
1978-04-06	Win	(Thailand) Saengsakda Kittikasem		Hat Yai, Thailand	Decision	5	3:00
1978-03-13	Win	(Thailand) Yodchat Sor Jitpattana	Lumpinee Stadium	Bangkok, Thailand	Decision	5	3:00
1978-02-16	Win	(Thailand) Saksakon Sakthanin	Lumpinee Stadium	Bangkok, Thailand	Decision	5	3:00
1977-01-25	Win	(Thailand) Sirichai Singnarai	Lumpinee Stadium	Bangkok, Thailand	Decision	5	3:00
1976-10-05	Win	(Thailand) Samingdam Thanasarntransport	Lumpinee Stadium	Bangkok, Thailand	Decision	5	3:00
1976-08-31	Loss	(Thailand) Chanchai Petchphotharam	Lumpinee Stadium	Bangkok, Thailand	Decision	5	3:00
1976-01-21	Loss	(Thailand) Sagat Petchyindee		Rayong, Thailand	Decision	5	3:00
Legend: Win Loss Draw/No contest Notes
