= William Galiwango =

Ugandan boxer

Personal information
- Nationality: Ugandan
- Born: 26 February 1961; Kampala, Uganda
- Died: 2015 (aged 53–54)

Sport
- Sport: Boxing

William Galiwango (26 February 1961 – 2015) was a Ugandan boxer. He competed in the men's light welterweight event at the 1984 Summer Olympics. At the 1984 Summer Olympics, he defeated Anthony Rose of Jamaica, before losing to Charles Nwokolo of Nigeria.
