= Nick Croombes =

Retired British boxer

Personal information
- Nationality: United Kingdom
- Born: 1958 (age 67–68)

Sport
- Sport: Boxing
Medal record
Boxing
Representing England
Commonwealth Games
Silver medal – second place	1982 Brisbane	light-middleweight

Nicholas Croombes (born 1958) is a retired British boxer. He also was the singer of the Band Tubeway Patrol.

== Boxing career ==
He represented England and won a silver medal in the 71 kg light-middleweight division, at the 1982 Commonwealth Games in Brisbane, Queensland, Australia.
