= Harold Hylton =

British boxer (born 1960)

Personal information
- Born: June 1, 1960 (age 66) Gloucester, England

Sport
- Sport: Boxing
Medal record
Boxing
Representing England
Commonwealth Games
Silver medal – second place	1982 Brisbane	heavyweight

Harold Hylton (born 1960) is a retired two time British Amateur Heavyweight Champion boxer.

== Boxing career ==
1982 ABA Heavyweight Champion, 1983 ABA Heavyweight Finalist, 1985 ABA Heavyweight Champion, 1988 ABA Heavyweight Finalist.

He represented England and won a silver medal in the 91 kg heavyweight division, at the 1982 Commonwealth Games in Brisbane, Queensland, Australia.

Hylton boxed for the Brockworth Viking ABC in Coney Hill Gloucester and was twice the ABA heavyweight champion in 1982 and 1985. Also, he was a twice beaten finalist in 1983 and 1988.
