= Boris Powell =

American professional boxer (1964–2022)

Personal information
- Born: December 19, 1964 St. Louis, U.S.
- Died: April 4, 2022 (aged 57)
- Height: 6 ft 3 in (191 cm)
- Weight: Heavyweight

Boxing career
- Reach: 80 in (203 cm)
- Stance: Southpaw

Boxing record
- Total fights: 32
- Wins: 30
- Win by KO: 17
- Losses: 2
- Draws: 0
- No contests: 0

Boris Orlando Powell (December 19, 1964 - April 4, 2022), nicknamed "The Champ", was an American professional boxer who competed from 1991 to 2001. As an amateur, he was the National Golden Gloves Heavyweight champion in 1989.

== Amateur career ==
In 1989, Powell won the St. Louis Golden Gloves followed by the National Golden Gloves.

== Professional career ==
Powell turned pro in 1991 and won his first 23 fights before losing to John Ruiz in 1995. He retired in 2001 after a five fight win streak.

== Personal life ==
Powell was a 1984 graduate of Vashon High School.

In October 2020, Powell was diagnosed with the neurological disease ALS. A local store owner at the St. Vincent de Paul thrift store assisted Powell's family with obtaining a motorized wheelchair, allowing Powell to stay mobile while he combatted his condition. In April 2021, the Jim Schoemehl Run for ALS selected Powell as the annual run's beneficiary.

Powell died of the disease on April 4, 2022.

== Career statistics ==
30 Wins (17 knockouts, 13 decisions), 2 Loss (0 knockouts, 2 decisions)
Result	Record	Opponent	Type	Round	Date	Location	Notes
Win	8-7-0	(United States) Marvin Hunt	TKO	X	03/11/2001	Saint Louis, Missouri, U.S.	
Win	2-16-0	(United States) Ken Woods	PTS	X	11/07/2000	Saint Louis, Missouri, U.S.	
Win	14-1-0	(United States) Greg Suttington	UD	X	16/10/1999	Merrillville, Indiana, U.S.	
Win	15-13-0	(United States) Artis Pendergrass	TKO	X	6/05/1999	(Washington (state)) Tacoma, Washington, U.S.	
Win	11-18-2	(United States) Mike DeVito	KO	X	23/10/1998	Chester, West Virginia, U.S.	
Loss	15-2-0	(United States) Robert Hawkins	UD	X	31/03/1998	Saint Louis, Missouri, U.S.	
Win	22-5-1	(United States) Richard Mason	UD	X	12/09/1997	Northlake, Illinois, U.S.	
Win	2-1-0	(United States) Stanley Wooten	KO	X	23/01/1997	Saint Louis, Missouri, U.S.	
Loss	12-2-0	(United States) John Ruiz	UD	X	04/02/1995	Las Vegas, Nevada, U.S.	
Win	4-11-0	(United States) David Cherry	KO	X	15/12/1994	Chicago, Illinois, U.S.	
Win	49-28-1	(United States) Bobby Crabtree	KO	X	23/09/1994	Cicero, Illinois, U.S.	
Win	15-13-0	(United States) Kimmuel Odum	PTS	X	25/07/1994	(Missouri) Joliet, Illinois, U.S.	
Win	16-4-0	(United States) West Turner	UD	X	07/04/1994	(Missouri) Joliet, Illinois, U.S.	
Win	5-5-0	(United States) Ron Gullette	KO	X	17/02/1994	(Missouri) Joliet, Illinois, U.S.	
Win	3-13-1	(United States) Brian Morgan	PTS	X	17/12/1993	Countryside, Illinois, U.S.	
Win	12-43-6	(United States) Danny Blake	PTS	X	19/11/1993	Countryside, Illinois, U.S.	
Win	13-2-0	(United States) Phil Scott	TKO	X	22/10/1993	Countryside, Illinois, U.S.	
Win	3-41-1	(United States) James Wilder	KO	X	17/09/1993	Countryside, Illinois, U.S.	
Win	2-8-0	(United States) George Harris	KO	X	28/08/1992	Countryside, Illinois, U.S.	
Win	2-10-1	(United States) Kevin Poindexter	TKO	X	26/08/1992	Countryside, Illinois, U.S.	
Win	10-6-1	(United States) Marshall Tillman	UD	X	11/04/1992	Las Vegas, Nevada, U.S.	
Win	5-2-2	(United States) Marion Wilson	UD	X	27/03/1992	Atlantic City, New Jersey, U.S.	
Win	1-32-1	(United States) James Wilder	KO	X	28/02/1992	Countryside, Illinois, U.S.	
Win	31-11-1	(United States) Eddie Taylor	RTD	X	17/01/1992	Peoria, Illinois, U.S.	
Win	1-2-2	(United States) Robert Smith	UD	X	13/12/1991	Countryside, Illinois, U.S.	
Win	4-0-2	(United States) Anthony Jackson	KO	X	22/11/1991	Peoria, Illinois, U.S.	
Win	0-1-0	(United States) Charlie Harris	KO	X	11/11/1991	Fort Lauderdale, Florida, U.S.	
Win	7-3-0	(United States) Jerry Jones	MD	X	08/08/1991	Atlantic City, New Jersey, U.S.	
Win	5-0-1	(United States) Marion Wilson	UD	X	13/06/1991	Philadelphia, Pennsylvania, U.S.	
Win	6-6-1	(United States) Kevin Casimier	TKO	X	03/05/1991	Saint Louis, Missouri, U.S.	
Win	debut	(United States) Martin Leach	KO	X	24/02/1991	Lexington, Kentucky, U.S.	
Win	1-1-0	(United States) Stanley Wright	UD	X	15/02/1991	Saint Louis, Missouri, U.S.	
