= James Omondi (boxer) =

Kenyan boxer (born 1958)

Personal information
- Nationality: Kenyan
- Born: 17 February 1958 (age 67)

Sport
- Sport: Boxing

James Omondi (born 17 February 1958) is a Kenyan boxer. He competed in the men's heavyweight event at the 1984 Summer Olympics. Omondi was the flag bearer for Kenya in the opening ceremony of the 1984 Summer Olympics.

Olympic Games
Preceded by Kip Keino	Flagbearer for Kenya; Los Angeles 1984	Succeeded by Patrick Waweru
