= Dave Griffiths (boxer) =

British boxer

Personal information
- Full name: David Griffiths
- Nationality: British
- Born: 26 November 1963 Cardiff, Wales
- Died: 2 March 2007 (aged 43) Cardiff, Wales
- Height: 5 ft 8.5 in (1.74 m)

Sport
- Sport: Boxing

David Griffiths (26 November 1963 – 2 March 2007) was a British boxer. He competed in the men's light welterweight event at the 1984 Summer Olympics, reaching the third round. He turned professional after the Games and won the Welsh super light-welterweight title in January 1988 and defended the title the following year.

== Early life ==
Griffiths was born in Glossop Terrace in Adamsdown, Cardiff, Wales. He was the youngest of nine children born to Kenneth Griffiths and his wife Vivienne. He attended Willows High School.

== Career ==
=== Amateur ===
Griffiths, a former Welsh Amateur Boxing Association champion, was chosen to represent Great Britain at the 1984 Summer Olympics in Los Angeles. At the time, he was working as a warehouseman alongside his boxing train. After receiving a bye in the first round, he was drawn against Clifton Charleswell of the United States Virgin Islands in the second. Griffiths won the bout via a unanimous judges' decision. In the third round, Griffiths met Dhawee Umponmaha of Thailand. He was eliminated after suffering a 4–1 points defeat, Umponmaha went on to win the silver medal in the event.

=== Professional ===
Griffiths turned professional after the Olympics, winning his debut fight against George Jones in January 1985. He suffered his first defeat two months later against Alastair Laurie but embarked on an undefeated run, winning five and drawing one of his next six fights. This streak was ended by points defeat to Angel Hernandez in February 1987.

In January 1988, Griffiths won the vacant Welsh super light-welterweight title by defeating Mark Pearce. He defended his title against Pearce in a rematch the following year. His last professional bout was in February 1990, in which he suffered a TKO defeat to Dave Pearce.

== Later life ==
After retiring from boxing, Griffiths worked as a builder and a labourer. He died in March 2007 at the age of 43.
