= Mohamed Bouchiche =

Algerian boxer (born 1962)

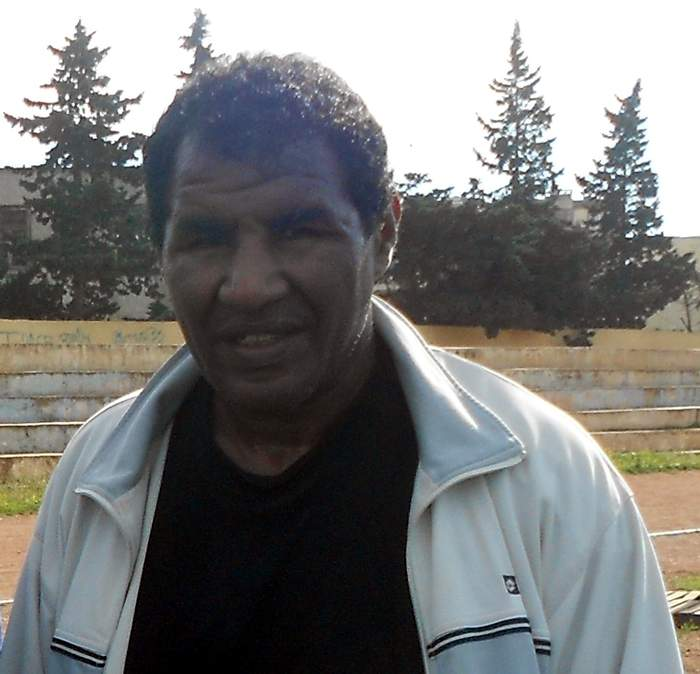
- Mohamed Bouchiche in 2016

Personal information
- Nationality: Algerian
- Born: Mohamed Bouchiche; February 24, 1962 (age 64) Oran
- Weight: Heavyweight

Boxing career
- Stance: Orthodox
Medal record
Men's amateur boxing
Representing Algeria
African Games
Silver medal – second place	1987 Nairobi	Heavyweight
Mediterranean Games
Gold medal – first place	1983 Casablanca	Heavyweight
Gold medal – first place	1987 Latakia	Heavyweight
Arab Championships
Gold medal – first place	1980 Iraq	Light heavyweight
Pan Arab Games
Silver medal – second place	1985 Rabat	Heavyweight

Mohamed Bouchiche (Arabic: محمد بوشيش; born February 24, 1962, in Oran) is an Algerian former boxer who fought in the heavyweight division. He participated for two times at the olympic games 1980 and 1984. He won many national and international titles.

== Career ==
Mohamed Bouchiche started boxing in his native city Oran with ASM Oran.

- Preliminaries (1/8) Olympic Games - Moscow, Soviet Union 1980 (81 kg)
- Preliminaries (1/8) Olympic Games - Los Angeles, USA 1984 (91 kg)
- (gold) Mediterranean Games Casablanca, Morocco 1983 (+81 kg)
- (gold) Mediterranean Game Latakia, Syria 1987 (91 kg)
- (gold) Arab Championships - Bagdad, Iraq 1980 (81 kg)
- (silver) All-Africa Games ( Nairobi, Kenya) 1987 (91 kg)
- (silver) Pan Arab Games Rabat, Morocco 1985 (91 kg)

=== International tournaments ===
- (gold) 24 Fevrier Tournament - Algiers, Algeria 1985 (+81 kg)
- (gold) President's Cup Jakarta, Indonesia 1986 (+81 kg)
- (gold) Trofeo Italia - Venice, Italy 1986 (91 kg)
- (bronze) Tammer Tournament - Tampere, Finland 1986 (91 kg)
- (bronze) Feliks Stamm Memorial - Warsaw, Poland 1983 (91 kg)
- Quarter-finals Goodwill Games - Moscow, Soviet Union 1986 (91 kg)

=== Pro career ===
Bouchiche turned pro in 1988 and had some success. He was African professional champion in the 90'.

== Olympic results ==
1980 Moscow

- Round of 16: Lost to Pawel Skrzecz (Poland) by walkover

1984 Los Angeles

- Lost to Willie de Wit (Canada) 0–5

== Professional boxing record ==
3 Wins (2 knockouts, 1 decision), 3 Losses (2 knockouts, 1 decision), 2 Draws
Res.	Record	Opponent	Type	Rd., Time	Date	Location	Notes
Loss	3-3-2	(France) Norbert Ekassi	TKO	2 (8)	1992-12-03	Salle Franklin, Saint-Jean-de-Luz, France	
Draw	3-2-2	(England) Glenn McCrory	PTS	8	1992-09-26	Paris, France	
Win	3-2-1	(Guyana) Roberto Lenueve	TKO	3	1992-06-12	Cayenne, French Guiana	
Loss	2-2-1	(Ivory Coast) Pascal Deban Koffi	PTS	6	1992-03-27	Creil, Oise, France	
Win	2-1-1	(Belgium) Yves Monsieur	PTS	8	1989-04-27	Arezzo, Toscana, Italy	
Loss	1-1-1	(France) Denis Truchet	TKO	2	1989-01-09	Nogent-le-Phaye, Eure-et-Loir, France	
Draw	1-0-1	(France) Lumbala Tshibamba	PTS	8	1988-10-21	L'Espace d'Ornon, Villanave d'Ornon, Gironde, France	
Win	1-0	(Italy) Antonio Manfredini	TKO	7	1988-08-06	San Pellegrino, Abruzzo, Italy	
