= Roland Omoruyi =

Nigerian boxer (born 1959)

Personal information
- Nationality: Nigerian
- Born: 5 June 1959 (age 66)

Sport
- Sport: Boxing

Roland Omoruyi (born 5 June 1959) is a Nigerian boxer. He competed at the 1980 Summer Olympics and the 1984 Summer Olympics.
