= Dodovic Owiny =

Ugandan boxer

Personal information
- Nationality: Ugandan
- Born: 8 May 1954 (age 70)

Sport
- Sport: Boxing

Dodovic Owiny (born 8 May 1954) is a Ugandan boxer. He competed in the men's heavyweight event at the 1984 Summer Olympics. In his first fight, he beat Michael Kenny of New Zealand, before losing to Willie deWit of Canada in the next round.
