= Loi Faaeteete =

Samoan boxer

Personal information
- Nationality: Samoan
- Born: 1 June 1960 (age 64)

Sport
- Sport: Boxing

Loi Faaeteete (born 1 June 1960) is a Samoan boxer. He competed in the men's heavyweight event at the 1984 Summer Olympics.
