= Michael Kenny (boxer) =

New Zealand boxer (1964–2024)

Personal information
- Born: 19 June 1964 Lower Hutt, New Zealand
- Died: 17 July 2024 (aged 60)
Medal record
Men's Boxing
Representing New Zealand
Commonwealth Games
Gold medal – first place	1990 Auckland	Super Heavyweight

Michael Vincent Noel James Kenny (19 June 1964 – 17 July 2024) was a New Zealand heavyweight boxer, who won the gold medal in the men's super heavyweight (+ 91 kg) division at the 1990 Commonwealth Games. He also represented his native country at 1984 Summer Olympics in Los Angeles, California, falling in the second round to Dodovic Owini from Uganda. Kenny died on 17 July 2024, at the age of 60.

== Sources ==
- New Zealand Olympic Committee
- New Zealand National Library photograph archive
