= Lisiate Lavulo =

Tongan boxer

Personal information
- Nationality: Tongan
- Born: 14 August 1961
- Died: 25 April 2018 (aged 56) California, United States

Sport
- Sport: Boxing

Lisiate Maikeli Lavulo (14 August 1961 – 25 April 2018) was a Tongan boxer. He competed in the men's light welterweight event at the 1984 Summer Olympics.
