= Chin Huay =

Thai food company

Chin Huay Public Company Limited (Note: Known in Thai as Charoen Utsahakam Public Company Limited (บริษัทเจริญอุตสาหกรรม จำกัด (มหาชน)), formerly Chin Huay (จิ้นฮ่วย)) is a Thai food manufacturing company specializing in the production of canned fish, dried fruit, and previously, canned fruit.

The business was established in 1925 in Tha Chalom, Samut Sakhon province by three Chinese immigrant brothers from Swatow. It originally produced fish sauce and soy sauce, and became one of Thailand's first canned fish producers the following year. The business was registered as a company on 12 September 1950, and later expanded into fruit canning—its workers invented the rambutan-stuffed-with-pineapple product—and dried fruit and healthy snacks. The company was taken public on 8 July 2021 and listed on the Stock Exchange of Thailand.
