= Ramy Zialor =

Seychellois boxer (born 1960)

Personal information
- Nationality: Seychellois
- Born: 6 July 1960 (age 66)
- Height: 1.60 m (5 ft 3 in)
- Weight: 64 kg (141 lb)

Sport
- Sport: Boxing
- Weight class: Featherweight; Light welterweight

Ramy Patrick Zialor (born 6 July 1960) is a Seychellois former boxer, and double Olympian.

Zialor became the first person to represent his country at the Olympic Games when he competed in the men's featherweight category at the 1980 Olympics. He was given a bye in round one, but was beaten in the second round by his Ethiopian opponent Leoul Neeraio. The same sequence of events was repeated four years later at the Los Angeles Olympics when he was defeated in round two by Jean Mbereke from Cameroon, this time boxing in the men's light welterweight competition.
