= Denis Lambert =

Canadian boxer

Personal information
- Born: Denis Lambert; September 18, 1961 (age 64) Montreal, Quebec, Canada
- Weight: Light welterweight

Boxing career

Denis Lambert (born September 18, 1961, in Montreal, Quebec) is a retired boxer from Canada who competed for his native country at the 1984 Summer Olympics in Los Angeles, California. There he was defeated in the second round of the men's light welterweight (– 63.5 kg) division by Yugoslavia's eventual bronze medalist Mirko Puzović.

== 1984 Olympic results ==
Below is the record of Denis Lambert, a Canadian light welterweight boxer who competed at the 1984 Los Angeles Olympics:

- Round of 64: bye
- Round of 32: lost to Mirko Puzović (Yugoslavia) by decision, 0–5
