= Apelu Ioane =

Samoan boxer (born 1959)

Personal information
- Nationality: Samoan
- Born: 17 March 1959 (age 66)

Sport
- Sport: Boxing

Apelu A. Ioane (born 17 March 1959) is a Samoan boxer. He competed in the men's light welterweight event at the 1984 Summer Olympics. He also represented New Zealand at the Commonwealth Games in 1982 and 1986.
