= Jaslal Pradhan =

Indian boxer

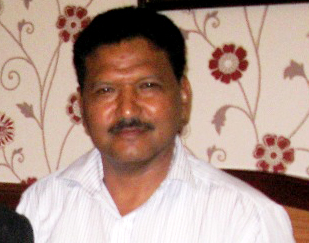

Personal information
- Nationality: Indian
- Born: 24 April 1957 (age 68); Lingmoo South Sikkim

Sport
- Sport: Boxing

Jaslal Pradhan (born 24 April 1957) is an Indian boxer. He competed in the men's light welterweight event at the 1984 Summer Olympics. At the 1984 Summer Olympics, he lost to Dhawee Umponmaha of Thailand.
