= Tevita Taufoʻou =

Tongan boxer

Personal information
- Nationality: Tongan
- Born: 4 June 1959 (age 65)

Sport
- Sport: Boxing

Tevita Taufoʻou (born 4 June 1959) is a Tongan boxer. He competed in the men's heavyweight event at the 1984 Summer Olympics.
