= Willie deWit =

Canadian boxer and Judge of the Alberta Court of Appeal

Personal information
- Born: June 13, 1961 (age 65) Three Hills, Alberta, Canada
- Height: 6 ft 2.5 in (189 cm)
- Weight: Heavyweight

Boxing career

Boxing record
- Total fights: 22
- Wins: 20
- Win by KO: 14
- Losses: 1
- Draws: 1
Medal record
Men's Boxing
Representing Canada
Olympic Games
Silver medal – second place	1984 Los Angeles	Heavyweight
Commonwealth Games
Gold medal – first place	1982 Brisbane	Heavyweight
World Cup
Bronze medal – third place	1983 Rome	Heavyweight

William Theodore deWit, Q.C. (born June 13, 1961) is a Justice of the Alberta Court of Appeal sitting in Calgary since 2023. Previously, he was a Judge of the Court of Queen's Bench (appointed 2017), a criminal defence lawyer and a professional boxer. He represented Canada at the 1984 Summer Olympics and won a silver medal in the heavyweight division. DeWit and teammate Shawn O'Sullivan were heavily touted going into the Games, as both had won the world championship.

== Personal life ==
DeWit played football in high school and was an all-star quarterback. He was offered a scholarship to the University of Alberta, but decided to quit football after he began learning how to box at a Grande Prairie health club which was run by a man named Jim Murrie. Impressed with his dedication and size, Murrie introduced deWit to Dr. Harry Snatic, a dentist and rancher who had been a youth boxing coach in Louisiana before moving his family in 1971 to Beaverlodge, a small town near Grande Prairie. He worked out with deWit three times a week, first in the health club, and then in the deWit's unheated garage where temperatures would often get to 10 or 20 degrees below zero.

In 1987, DeWit lost his father, Len de Wit, and younger brother, Theo, who was 23 at the time, in a plane crash that killed 4 people. The plane, a Cessna 210, crashed into a forested area and exploded near Grande Prairie, Alberta.

== Amateur boxing career ==
DeWit's first fight came at the Alberta provincial championships in March 1979 in Medicine Hat. Snatic entered deWit in the light heavyweight intermediate novice division for boxers age 17 to 20 with less than 10 fights. DeWit knocked out his first opponent in 20 seconds which caused the coaches of the six other fighters in the division to pull their fighters. DeWit had won his first championship. Snatic then entered deWit in the British Columbia Golden Gloves championships where he fought 18-year-old Shane Anderson who was the western Canadian 178-pound champion and a veteran of about 40 fights. DeWit lost by decision, but he did beat Anderson in two of three return matches. In the last of those bouts, deWit knocked out Anderson, who never fought again.

Snatic then took deWit to fight at the Washington State Penitentiary where he knocked out his opponent in the opening minute of the first round. Afterwards in April 1982, Snatic decided to sell his ranch and moved to Calgary. deWit went with him in order to find sparring partners, and to train with a Ugandan exile named Mansoor Esmail, who was Calgary's top boxing coach, and was considered a physical conditioning genius.

DeWit's first major victory came in Las Vegas in June 1982 when he knocked out Cuba's Pedro Cardenas to win his first North American title. Then he won gold at the Commonwealth Games, taking him a total of three minutes and 12 seconds to knock out three opponents. In March 1983 he defeated Alexander Yagubkin of the U.S.S.R. to win the world title. Then, in September 1983 he defended his North American title against highly touted Cuban Aurelio Toyo.

Leading up to the 1984 Olympics, a benefit in Calgary featuring boxing fan Ryan O'Neal and Farrah Fawcett raised $70,000 to finance DeWit's training. At this point Snatic began importing professional sparring partners from the United States.

=== 1984 Olympics ===
At the 1984 Los Angeles Olympics deWit lost the gold medal match in the heavyweight division to Henry Tillman of the United States. Heading into the Olympic Games, deWit and fellow Canadian Shawn O'Sullivan were considered favorites, particularly by Canadian fans and the Canadian media. The Tillman-deWit gold medal final featured no decisive blows; however, deWit appeared to win the first two rounds against Tillman with productive work to Tillman's midsection, although Tillman clearly won the third round. Nevertheless, Tillman won by a 5-0 decision. Three of the five judges controversially scored every round for Tillman. The unanimous decision startled Howard Cosell who was calling the bout for ABC Sports. "Good Lord! How do you like that?" Cosell blurted when the decision was announced. During his post-fight interviews, Cosell informed both Tillman and deWit that he personally disagreed with the official verdict. Tillman had also won a controversial decision in his semifinal bout, as had deWit.

=== Olympic results ===
- 1st Round: bye
- Round of 16: Defeated Mohamed Bouchiche of Algeria by unanimous decision, 5–0
- Quarterfinal: Defeated Dodovic Owiny of Uganda by a first-round knockout
- Semifinal: Defeated Arnold Vanderlyde of the Netherlands by split decision, 3–2
- Final: Lost to Henry Tillman of the United States by unanimous decision, 0–5 (was awarded silver medal)

== Professional boxing career ==
Tabbed early as a "Great White Hope," deWit turned professional immediately, persuaded in part by a contract offer reportedly worth $1 million and began to train out of Burnet, Texas. He then defeated Ken Lakusta to capture the Canadian heavyweight championship.

A loss to Bert Cooper in 1987 was deWit's only career defeat, as he retired after five consecutive wins, the last of which being a unanimous decision victory over Henry Tillman.

== Life after sport ==
After announcing his retirement from boxing he worked and was part owner in a concrete surfacing company in California, which he eventually left to return to Canada. A friend of his who was a judge, suggested he get an education and become a lawyer. DeWit returned to school and graduated from the University of Alberta in 1994 with a law degree. He was appointed Queen's Counsel (Q.C.) in 2013 and is the former president of the Canadian Bar Association Criminal Law subsection.

In 1995 deWit was inducted into the Alberta Sports Hall of Fame. He also has a street named after him in Grande Prairie, Alberta.

In 2012, deWit made a cameo appearance in the Calgary-based Souls in Rhythm band's musical video Another Round (featuring hop-hop artist Transit).

In 2017, deWit was appointed a Justice of the Court of Queen's Bench of Alberta (known as the Court of King's Bench since the accession of Charles III). In 2023 he was elevated to the Alberta Court of Appeal, and sits primarily in Calgary.

== Professional boxing record ==
20 Wins (14 knockouts, 6 decisions), 1 Loss (1 knockout), 1 Draw
Result	Record	Opponent	Type	Round	Date	Location	Notes
Win	20-1-1	(United States) Henry Tillman	UD	10	29/03/1988	(Canada) Edmonton, Alberta	100-94, 98-94, 97-95.
Win	19-1-1	(Canada) Tony Morrison	UD	10	20/02/1988	(Canada) Centre 200, Sydney, Nova Scotia	Canada Heavyweight Title.
Win	18-1-1	(United States) Donnie Long	RTD	4	03/10/1987	(Canada) Grande Prairie, Alberta	Long did not come out for the fourth round.
Win	17-1-1	(Canada) Ken Lakusta	KO	5	24/08/1987	(Canada) Northlands Agricom, Edmonton, Alberta	Canada Heavyweight Title. Lakusta knocked out at 2:32 of the fifth round.
Win	16-1-1	(United States) Terry Mims	KO	2	21/05/1987	(United States) Arco Arena, Sacramento, California	Mims knocked out at 1:35 of the second round.
Loss	15-1-1	(United States) Bert Cooper	TKO	2	14/02/1987	(Canada) Regina, Saskatchewan	Referee stopped the bout at 2:58 of the second round.
Win	15-0-1	(United States) Lorenzo Canady	TKO	4	13/12/1986	(Canada) Regina Agridome, Regina, Saskatchewan	Referee stopped the bout at 1:04 of the fourth round.
Win	14-0-1	(Canada) Conroy Nelson	TKO	4	10/11/1986	(Canada) Halifax Metro Centre, Halifax, Nova Scotia	Canada Heavyweight Title.
Win	13-0-1	(United States) Andrew Stokes	UD	10	30/09/1986	(Canada) Agridome, Edmonton, Alberta	100-91, 100-92, 99-92.
Win	12-0-1	(Canada) Ken Lakusta	UD	12	14/06/1986	(Canada) Northlands Coliseum, Edmonton, Alberta	Canada Heavyweight Title. 116-114, 120-111, 118-113.
Win	11-0-1	(United States) Mike Acey	TKO	3	03/05/1986	(Canada) Regina Agridome, Regina, Saskatchewan	
Win	10-0-1	(United States) Jeff Jordan	RTD	4	20/03/1986	(Canada) Stampede Corral, Calgary, Alberta	Jordan did not come out for the fifth round.
Win	9-0-1	(United States) George Graham	TKO	2	03/02/1986	(Canada) Northlands Agricom, Edmonton, Alberta	
Win	8-0-1	(United States) Scott Wheaton	UD	10	13/12/1985	(Canada) Stampede Corral, Calgary, Alberta	
Win	7-0-1	(United States) Otis Bates	KO	3	03/10/1985	(United States) Austin, Texas	
Win	6-0-1	(United States) Marion Bridges	TKO	2	11/09/1985	(United States) Trump Plaza Hotel and Casino, Atlantic City, New Jersey	
Win	5-0-1	(United States) Earl Lewis	TKO	3	11/07/1985	(United States) Trump Plaza Hotel and Casino, Atlantic City, New Jersey	Referee stopped the bout at 2:00 of the third round.
Win	4-0-1	(United States) Sterling Benjamin	UD	6	05/06/1985	(United States) Resorts Casino Hotel, Atlantic City, New Jersey	
Draw	3-0-1	(Canada) Alex Williamson	PTS	6	15/04/1985	(United States) Caesars Palace, Las Vegas, Nevada	59-55, 56-57, 57-57.
Win	3-0	(Tonga) Tony Pelu	KO	2	05/03/1985	(United States) Dallas Convention Center Arena, Dallas, Texas	Pelu knocked out at 2:49 of the second round.
Win	2-0	(United States) Inoke Katoa	TKO	4	24/01/1985	(United States) Showboat Hotel and Casino, Las Vegas, Nevada	
Win	1-0	(United States) Walter E.M. Morris	TKO	2	01/12/1984	(Canada) Northlands Coliseum, Edmonton, Alberta	
