= Joe Orewa =

Nigerian boxer

Personal information
- Born: 12 June 1960 (age 66)
Medal record
Men's Boxing
Representing Nigeria
Commonwealth Games
Gold medal – first place	1982 Brisbane	Bantamweight

Joseph “Joe” Orewa, also known as King Cobra (born 12 June 1960) is a Nigerian boxer. He competed at the 1984 Summer Olympics in Los Angeles, in the bantamweight class. He won a gold medal at the 1982 Commonwealth Games in Brisbane.
