= Håkan Brock =

Swedish boxer

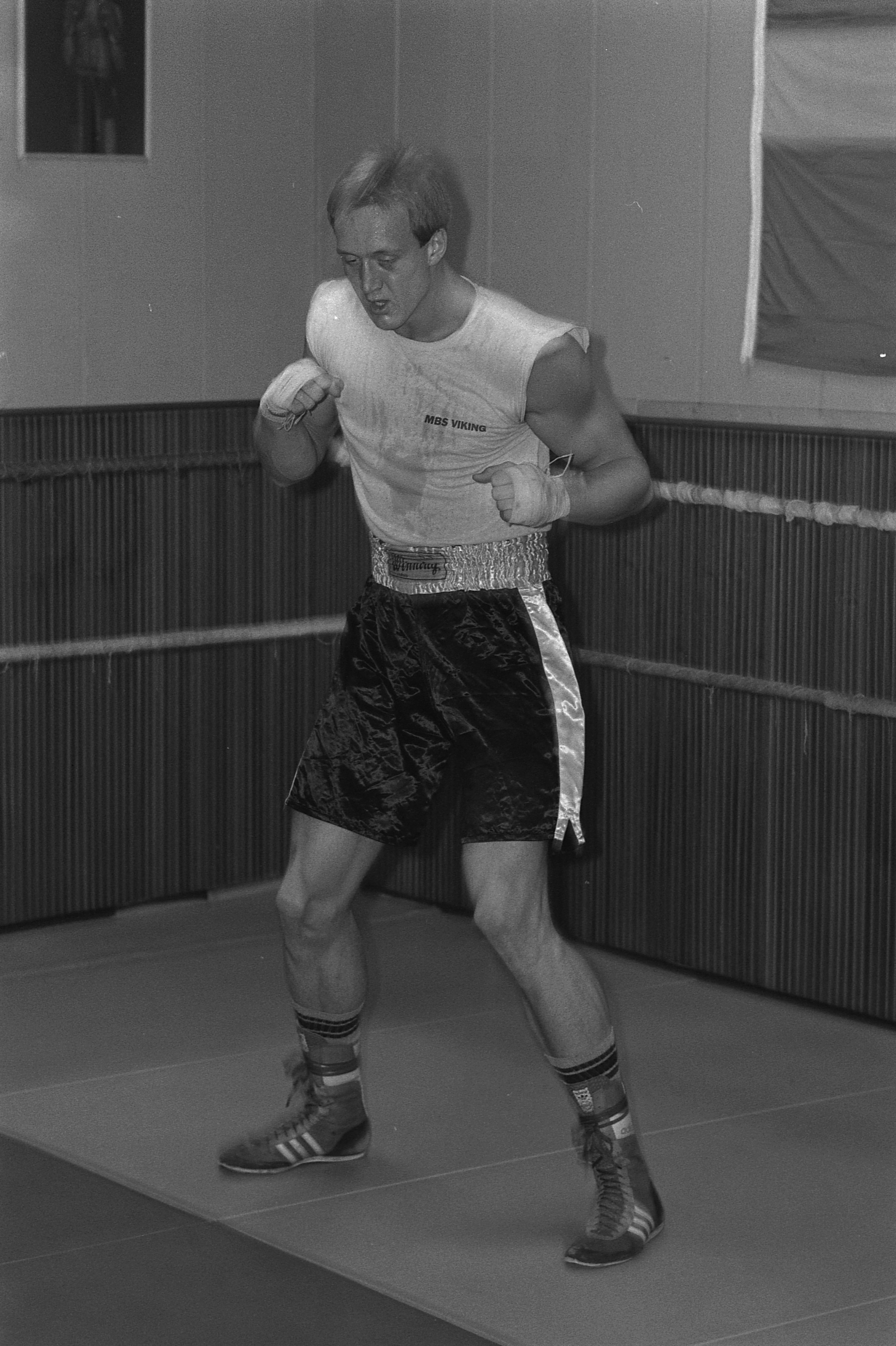

Personal information
- Nationality: Swedish
- Born: 15 May 1961 (age 63); Lund, Sweden

Sport
- Sport: Boxing

Håkan Brock (born 15 May 1961) is a Swedish boxer. He competed in the men's heavyweight event at the 1984 Summer Olympics.
