= Boxing at the 1983 Pan American Games =

The Men's Boxing Tournament at the 1983 Pan American Games was held in Caracas, Venezuela, from August 14 to August 29. The super heavyweight division was included for the first time.

== Medal winners ==
Event	Gold	Silver	Bronze
Light Flyweight (– 48 kilograms)	Rafael Ramos; Puerto Rico	Paul Gonzales; United States	Héctor Díaz; Dominican Republic Manoelito Santos; Brazil
Flyweight (– 51 kilograms)	Pedro Orlando Reyes; Cuba	Laureano Ramírez Padilla; Dominican Republic	Jesus Poll; Venezuela Steve McCrory; United States
Bantamweight (– 54 kilograms)	Manuel Vilchez; Venezuela	Pedro Nolasco; Dominican Republic	Robinsón Pitalúa; Colombia Floyd Favors; United States
Featherweight (– 57 kilograms)	Adolfo Horta; Cuba	Santos Cardona; Puerto Rico	Bernard Gary; United States Rafael Zuñiga; Colombia
Lightweight (– 60 kilograms)	Pernell Whitaker; United States	Ángel Herrera Vera; Cuba	Alberto Cortez; Argentina Angel Beltre; Dominican Republic
Light Welterweight (– 63.5 kilograms)	Candelario Duvergel; Cuba	Jerry Page; United States	Genaro Léon; Mexico Giovanni Sepulveda; Dominican Republic
Welterweight (– 67 kilograms)	Louis Howard; United States	José Aguilar; Cuba	Luis Luis García; Venezuela Antonio Madureira; Brazil
Light Middleweight (– 71 kilograms)	Orestes Solano; Cuba	Dennis Milton; United States	Dario Matteoni; Argentina Héctor Ortíz; Puerto Rico
Middleweight (– 75 kilograms)	Bernardo Comas; Cuba	Alfredo Delgado; Puerto Rico	Pedro Gamarro; Venezuela (Trinidad and Tobago) John Smith; Trinidad & Tobago
Light Heavyweight (– 81 kilograms)	Pablo Romero; Cuba	Evander Holyfield; United States	Miguel Mosna; Argentina Carlos Salazar; Venezuela
Heavyweight (– 91 kilograms)	Aurelio Toyo; Cuba	Henry Tillman; United States	Virgilio Frias; Dominican Republic Alex Stewart; Jamaica
Super Heavyweight (+ 91 kilograms)	Jorge Luis González; Cuba	Eloy Loaiza; Venezuela	Tyrell Biggs; United States

== Medal table ==
Rank	Nation	Gold	Silver	Bronze	Total
1	Cuba	8	2	0	10
2	United States	2	5	4	11
3	Puerto Rico	1	2	1	4
4	Venezuela	1	1	4	6
5	Dominican Republic	0	2	4	6
6	Argentina	0	0	3	3
7	Brazil	0	0	2	2
7	Colombia	0	0	2	2
9	Jamaica	0	0	1	1
9	Mexico	0	0	1	1
9	Trinidad and Tobago	0	0	1	1
Totals (11 entries)		12	12	23	47
