= Charles Nwokolo =

Nigerian boxer (born 1960)

Personal information
- Nationality: Nigerian
- Born: 21 September 1960 (age 65) Lagos, Nigeria

Sport
- Sport: Boxing
Medal record
Men's boxing
Representing Nigeria
Commonwealth Games
Bronze medal – third place	1982 Brisbane	Welterweight

Charles Nwokolo, also known by his nickname Young Dick Tiger (born 21 August 1960) is a Nigerian former professional boxer. As an amateur, he competed in the men's light welterweight event at the 1984 Summer Olympics.
