= Octavio Robles =

Mexican boxer (born 1963)

Personal information
- Nationality: Mexican
- Born: 16 January 1963 (age 62)

Sport
- Sport: Boxing

Octavio Robles (born 16 January 1963) is a Mexican boxer. He competed in the men's light welterweight event at the 1984 Summer Olympics.
