= Virgilio Frias =

Dominican boxer

Personal information
- Nationality: Dominican

Sport
- Sport: Boxing
Medal record
Men's amateur boxing
Representing Dominican Republic
Pan American Games
Bronze medal – third place	1983 Caracas	Heavyweight

Virgilio Frias is a Dominican Republic boxer. He competed in the men's heavyweight event at the 1984 Summer Olympics.
