= Javid Aslam =

Norwegian boxer

Javid Iqbal Aslam (born 26 January 1963) is a Norwegian boxer of Pakistani origin. He was born in Faisalabad in Punjab, Pakistan. He competed for Norway at the 1984 Summer Olympics in Los Angeles in the men's light-welterweight event.
