= Mircea Fulger =

Romanian boxer

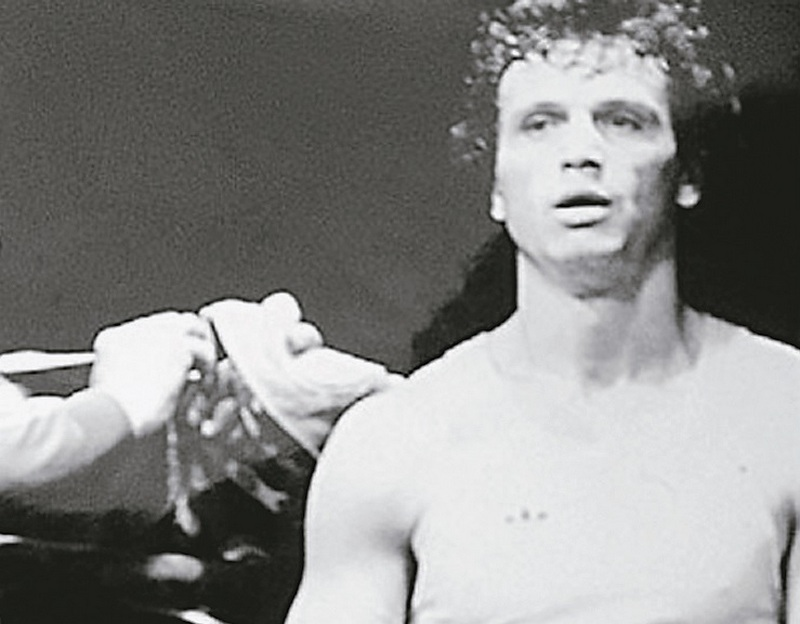

Personal information
- Born: 26 January 1959 (age 67) Hârseşti, Romania
- Height: 173 cm (5 ft 8 in)

Sport
- Sport: Boxing
Medal record
Representing Romania
Romania National Amateur Boxing Championships
Gold medal – first place	1982 Bucharest	-63.5 kg
Gold medal – first place	1983 Constanța	-63.5 kg
Olympic Games
Bronze medal – third place	1984 Los Angeles	-63.5 kg

Mircea Fulger (born 26 January 1959) is a retired light-welterweight boxer from Romania who won a bronze medal at the 1984 Olympics. He also won two national senior titles. Fulger retired in December 1984 to become a boxing coach and international referee.
