= Jorge Maysonet =

Puerto Rican boxer

Personal information
- Full name: Jorge Luis Maysonet
- Nationality: Puerto Rican
- Born: 13 February 1964 (age 61); Cataño, Puerto Rico

Sport
- Sport: Boxing

Jorge Luis Maysonet (born 13 February 1964) is a Puerto Rican former professional boxer who challenged for the IBF welterweight title in 1989. As an amateur, he competed in the men's light welterweight event at the 1984 Summer Olympics.
