= Charles Owiso =

Kenyan boxer (born 1958)

Personal information
- Nationality: Kenyan
- Born: 19 November 1958 (age 66)

Sport
- Sport: Boxing

Charles Owiso (born 19 November 1958) is a Kenyan former professional boxer who won the African lightweight title in 1999 and challenged for the African light welterweight title in 2001. As an amateur, he competed in the men's light welterweight event at the 1984 Summer Olympics.
