= Boxing at the 1972 Summer Olympics – Light middleweight =

Olympic boxing tournament

Light middleweight boxing at the Games of the XX Olympiad
- Venue: Boxing Hall, Munich
- Dates: 28 August – 10 September 1972
- Competitors: 34 from 34 nations

Medalists
1st place, gold medalist(s)		Dieter Kottysch	West Germany
2nd place, silver medalist(s)		Wiesław Rudkowski	Poland
3rd place, bronze medalist(s)		Alan Minter	Great Britain
3rd place, bronze medalist(s)		Peter Tiepold	East Germany

The men's light middleweight event was part of the boxing programme at the 1972 Summer Olympics. The weight class allowed boxers of up to 71 kilograms to compete. The competition was held from 28 August to 10 September 1972. 34 boxers from 34 nations competed.

== Medalists ==
Gold	Dieter Kottysch; West Germany
Silver	Wiesław Rudkowski; Poland
Bronze	Alan Minter; Great Britain
Bronze	Peter Tiepold; East Germany

== Results ==
The following boxers took part in the event:

Rank	Name	Country
1	Dieter Kottysch	West Germany
2	Wiesław Rudkowski	Poland
3T	Alan Minter	Great Britain
3T	Peter Tiepold	East Germany
5T	Loucif Hamani	Algeria
5T	Mohamed Majeri	Tunisia
5T	Emeterio Villanueva	Mexico
5T	Rolando Garbey	Cuba
9T	Anthony Richardson	Netherlands
9T	Valery Tregubov	Soviet Union
9T	Evangelos Oikonomakos	Greece
9T	Alan Jenkinson	Australia
9T	Mikko Saarinen	Finland
9T	Christy Elliott	Ireland
9T	Nayden Stanchev	Bulgaria
9T	Im Jae-geun	South Korea
17T	Svetomir Belić	Yugoslavia
17T	José Antonio Colon	Puerto Rico
17T	Reggie Ford	Guyana
17T	Reggie Jones	United States
17T	Nicolas Aquilino	Philippines
17T	Bonifacio Ávila	Colombia
17T	Issoufou Habou	Niger
17T	Michel Belliard	France
17T	David Attan	Kenya
17T	Ion Györffi	Romania
17T	Farouk Kesrouan	Lebanon
17T	Alfredo Lemus	Venezuela
17T	Antonio Castellini	Italy
17T	John Opio	Uganda
17T	Franz Csandl	Austria
32T	Namkhain Tsend-Ayuush	Mongolia
32T	Ricky Barnor	Ghana
32T	Oumar Fall	Senegal

=== First round ===
- Rolando Garbey (CUB) def. Ricky Barnor (GHA), 5:0
- Svetomir Belic (YUG) def. Oumar Fall (SEN), 4:1

=== Second round ===
- Anthony Richardson (HOL) def. Svetomir Belic (YUG), 3:2
- Loucif Hanmani (ALG) def. José Antonio Colon (PUR), 5:0
- Alan Minter (GBR) def. Reginald Ford (GUY), KO-2
- Valeri Tregubov (URS) def. Reggie Jones (USA), 3:2

Reggie Jones was controversially eliminated in the second round of the light middleweight division (– 71 kg) by Valeri Tregubov of the Soviet Union in a fight he was generally accepted to have won.

- Evengelos Oikonomakos (GRE) def. Nicolas Aquilino (PHI), 5:0
- Dieter Kottysch (FRG) def. Bonifacio Avila (COL), TKO-2
- Mohamed Majeri (TUN) def. Issoufou Habou (NIG), 5:0
- Alan Jenkinson (AUS) def. Michel Belliard (FRA), 4:1
- Mikko Saarinen (FIN) def. David Attan (KEN), TKO-2
- Peter Tiepold (GDR) def. Ion Györfi (ROU), 4:1
- Christopher Elliott (IRL) def. Farouk Kesrouan (LEB), 5:0
- Emeterio Villanueva (MEX) def. Alfredo Lemus (VEN), 4:1
- Wiesław Rudkowski (POL) def. Antonio Castellini (ITA), 5:0
- Nayden Stanchev (BUL) def. John Opio (UGA), 3:2
- Rolando Garbey (CUB) def. Franz Csandl (AUT), 5:0
- Jae Keun-Lim (KOR) def. Namchal Tsendaiush (MGL), 3:2

=== Third round ===
- Loucif Hanmani (ALG) def. Anthony Richardson (HOL), TKO-2
- Alan Minter (GBR) def. Valeri Tregubov (URS), 5:0
- Dieter Kottysch (FRG) def. Evengelos Oikonomakos (GRE), 5:0
- Mohamed Majeri (TUN) def. Alan Jenkinson (AUS), 5:0
- Peter Tiepold (GDR) def. Mikko Saarinen (FIN), 5:0
- Emeterio Villanueva (MEX) def. Christopher Elliott (IRL), TKO-3
- Wiesław Rudkowski (POL) def. Nayden Stanchev (BUL), 5:0
- Rolando Garbey (CUB) def. Jae Keun-Lim (KOR), TKO-2

=== Quarterfinals ===
- Alan Minter (GBR) def. Loucif Hanmani (ALG), 4:1
- Dieter Kottysch (FRG) def. Mohamed Majeri (TUN), 5:0
- Peter Tiepold (GDR) def. Emeterio Villanueva (MEX), 5:0
- Wiesław Rudkowski (POL) def. Rolando Garbey (CUB), 4:1

=== Semifinals ===
- Dieter Kottysch (FRG) def. Alan Minter (GBR), 3:2
- Wiesław Rudkowski (POL) def. Peter Tiepold (GDR), 4:1

=== Final ===
- Dieter Kottysch (FRG) def. Wiesław Rudkowski (POL), 3:2
