= Boxing at the 1968 Summer Olympics – Welterweight =

Boxing competitions

The Welterweight class in the boxing competition was the fifth-highest weight class. Welterweights were limited to those boxers weighing a maximum of 67 kilograms (147.8 lbs). 33 boxers qualified for this category. Like all Olympic boxing events, the competition was a straight single-elimination tournament. Both semifinal losers were awarded bronze medals, so no boxers competed again after their first loss. Bouts consisted of six rounds each. Five judges scored each bout.

== Medalists ==
Gold	Manfred Wolke; East Germany
Silver	Joseph Bessala; Cameroon
Bronze	Mario Guilloti; Argentina
Bronze	Vladimir Musalimov; Soviet Union

== Schedule ==
Date	Round
Sunday, October 13, 1968	First round
Saturday, October 19, 1968	Second round
Tuesday, October 22, 1968	Third round
Wednesday, October 23, 1968	Quarterfinals
Thursday, October 24, 1968	Semifinals
Saturday, October 26, 1968	Final Bout

== Draw ==
=== Finals ===
Semifinals		Final
Manfred Wolke (GDR)	3
Vladimir Musalimov (URS)	2	Manfred Wolke (GDR)	4
Mario Guilloti (ARG)	0	Joseph Bessala (CMR)	1
Joseph Bessala (CMR)	5

=== Top half ===
First round
Dieter Kottysch (FRG)	RSC
Mauri Saarivainio (FIN)

Second round
Celal Sandal (TUR)	3
Aaron Popoola (GHA)	2
Ivan Kiryakov (BUL)
Bohumil Němeček (TCH)	DSQ-3
Manfred Wolke (GDR)	4
Andrés Molina (CUB)	1
Expedito Alencar (BRA)	RSC
Tadesse Gebregiorgis (ETH)
Alfonso Ramírez (MEX)	3
Marco Scano (ITA)	2
Evangelos Oikonomakos (GRE)	3
Alan Tottoh (GBR)	2
Vladimir Musalimov (URS)	5
Dieter Kottysch (FRG)	0
José Durán (ESP)	3
Park Koo-il (KOR)	2

Third round
Celal Sandal (TUR)	RSC
Ivan Kiriakov (BUL)
Manfred Wolke (GDR)	5
Expedito Arrais (BRA)	0
Alfonso Ramírez (MEX)	4
Evangelos Ekonomakos (GRE)	1
Vladimir Musalimov (URS)	5
José Durán (ESP)

Quarterfinals
Celal Sandal (TUR)	1
Manfred Wolke (GDR)	4
Alfonso Ramírez (MEX)	0
Vladimir Musalimov (URS)	5

Semifinals
Manfred Wolke (GDR)	3
Vladimir Musalimov (URS)	2

=== Bottom half ===
First round
Julius Luipa (ZAM)	4
Rabah Labiod (ALG)	1

Second round
Armando Muñíz (USA)	4
Marian Kasprzyk (POL)	1
Max Hebeisen (SUI)	4
Mohamed Bouchara (MAR)	1
Donato Paduano (CAN)	4
Fidelis Onye Som (NGR)	1
Mario Guilloti (ARG)	4
Andrew Kajjo (UGA)	1
Victor Zilberman (ROU)	RSC
Jørgen Hansen (DEN)
István Gáli (HUN)	RSC
Yvon Mariolle (FRA)
Joseph Bessala (CMR)	5
Luis González (CHI)	0
Julius Luipa (ZAM)
Bye

Third round
Armando Muñíz (USA)	4
Max Hebeisen (SUI)	1
Donato Paduano (CAN)	0
Mario Guilloti (ARG)	5
Victor Zilberman (ROU)	5
István Gáli (HUN)	0
Joseph Bessala (CMR)	RSC
Julius Luipa (ZAM)

Quarterfinals
Armando Muñíz (USA)	1
Mario Guilloti (ARG)	4
Victor Zilberman (ROU)
Joseph Bessala (CMR)	RSC

Semifinals
Mario Guilloti (ARG)	0
Joseph Bessala (CMR)	5
