= Boxing at the 1976 Summer Olympics – Light middleweight =

Olympic boxing tournament

Light middleweight boxing at the Games of the XXI Olympiad
- Venue: Maurice Richard Arena, Montreal
- Dates: 22–31 July 1976
- Competitors: 23 from 23 nations

Medalists
1st place, gold medalist(s)		Jerzy Rybicki	Poland
2nd place, silver medalist(s)		Tadija Kačar	Yugoslavia
3rd place, bronze medalist(s)		Rolando Garbey	Cuba
3rd place, bronze medalist(s)		Viktor Savchenko	Soviet Union

The men's light middleweight event was part of the boxing programme at the 1976 Summer Olympics. The weight class allowed boxers of up to 71 kilograms to compete. The competition was held from 22 to 31 July 1976. 23 boxers from 23 nations competed.

== Medalists ==
Gold	Jerzy Rybicki; Poland
Silver	Tadija Kačar; Yugoslavia
Bronze	Rolando Garbey; Cuba
Bronze	Viktor Savchenko; Soviet Union

== Results ==
The following boxers took part in the event:

Rank	Name	Country
1	Jerzy Rybicki	Poland
2	Tadija Kačar	Yugoslavia
3T	Rolando Garbey	Cuba
3T	Viktor Savchenko	Soviet Union
5T	Wilfredo Guzman	Puerto Rico
5T	Kalevi Kosunen	Finland
5T	Alfredo Lemus	Venezuela
5T	Vasile Didea	Romania
9T	Chuck Walker	United States
9T	Robbie Davies	Great Britain
9T	Earl Liburd	Virgin Islands
9T	Mohamed Azar Hazin	Iran
9T	Brian Byrne	Ireland
9T	Pierangelo Pira	Italy
9T	Leo Vainonen	Sweden
9T	Nayden Stanchev	Bulgaria
17T	Wayne Devlin	Australia
17T	Jorge Amparo	Dominican Republic
17T	Franz Dorfer	Austria
17T	Michael Prevost	Canada
17T	Dashnyamyn Olzvoi	Mongolia
17T	Juan Scassino	Uruguay
17T	Poul Frandsen	Denmark

=== First round ===
- Robert Davies (GBR) def. Wayne Devlin (AUS), KO-2
- Alfredo Lemus (VEN) def. Mohamed Dawuda (GHA), walk-over
- Pierangelo Pira (ITA) def. Ekue Gogli (TOG), walk-over
- Viktor Savchenko (URS) def. John Odhiambo (UGA), walk-over
- Earl Liburd (VIS) def. Mohamed Majeri (TUN), walk-over
- Rolando Garbey (CUB) def. Dashnyamyn Olzvoi (MGL), KO-3
- Leo Vainonen (SWE) def. Jorge Amparo (DOM), 4:1
- Kalevi Kosunen (FIN) def. Juan Scassino (URU), 4:1
- Mohamed Azarhazin (IRN) def. Franz Dorfer (AUT), 4:1
- Tadija Kačar (YUG) def. Poul Frandsen (DEN), 5:0
- Vasile Didea (ROM) def. Michael Prevost (CAN), DSQ-3
- Nayden Stanchev (BUL) def. Steven Moi (KEN), walk-over

=== Second round ===
- Jerzy Rybicki (POL) def. Chuck Walker (USA), 3:2
- Wilfredo Guzmán (PUR) def. Brian Byrne (IRL), 3:2
- Alfredo Lemus (VEN) def. Robert Davies (GBR), 4:1
- Viktor Savchenko (URS) def. Pierangelo Pira (ITA), KO-2
- Rolando Garbey (CUB) def. Earl Liburd (VIS), RSC-2
- Kalevi Kosunen (FIN) def. Leo Vainonen (SWE), 4:1
- Tadija Kačar (YUG) def. Mohamed Azarhazin (IRN), 5:0
- Vasile Didea (ROM) def. Nayden Stanchev (BUL), 5:0

=== Quarterfinals ===
- Jerzy Rybicki (POL) def. Wilfredo Guzmán (PUR), 5:0
- Viktor Savchenko (URS) def. Alfredo Lemus (VEN), KO-2
- Rolando Garbey (CUB) def. Kalevi Kosunen (FIN), RSC-1
- Tadija Kačar (YUG) def. Vasile Didea (ROM), 5:0

=== Semifinals ===
- Jerzy Rybicki (POL) def. Viktor Savchenko (URS), 3:2
- Tadija Kačar (YUG) def. Rolando Garbey (CUB), 4:1

=== Final ===
- Jerzy Rybicki (POL) def. Tadija Kačar (YUG), 5:0
