= Algeria at the 1972 Summer Olympics =

- IOC code: ALG
- NOC: Algerian Olympic Committee

in Munich
- Competitors: 5 (men) in 2 sports
- Flag bearer: Azzedine Azzouzi
- Medals: Gold 0 Silver 0 Bronze 0 Total 0

Summer Olympics appearances (overview)
- 1964; 1968; 1972; 1976; 1980; 1984; 1988; 1992; 1996; 2000; 2004; 2008; 2012; 2016; 2020; 2024

Other related appearances
- France (1896–1960)

Algeria competed at the 1972 Summer Olympics in Munich, West Germany.

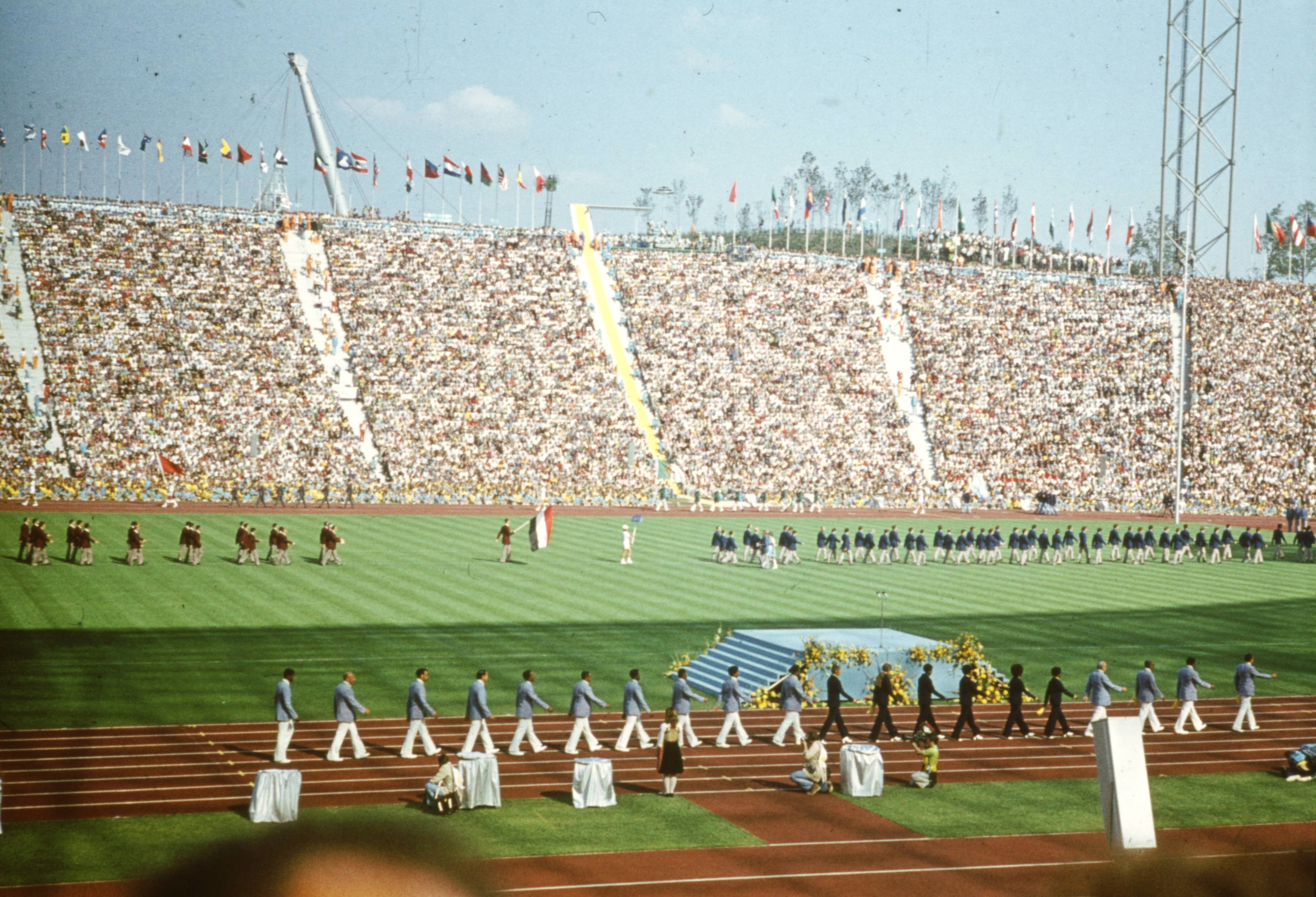
the Algerian team (at the background track) entering in the opening ceremony

== Athletics ==
Key

- Note–Ranks given for track events are within the athlete's heat only
- Q = Qualified for the next round
- q = Qualified for the next round as a fastest loser or, in field events, by position without achieving the qualifying target
- NR = National record
- N/A = Round not applicable for the event
- Bye = Athlete not required to compete in round
- NP = Not placed

Men
Track & road events

Athlete	Event	Heat		Semifinal		Final	
Athlete	Event	Result	Rank	Result	Rank	Result	Rank
Azzedine Azzouzi	800 m	1:49.4	3 Q	1:49.4	6	did not advance	
Azzedine Azzouzi	1500 m	3:46.4	7	did not advance			
Mohamed Sid Ali Djouadi	800 m	1:50.4	5	did not advance			
Mohamed Kacemi	1500 m	3:45.2	8	did not advance			
Boualem Rahoui	5000 m	13:45.0	8	—		did not advance	
Boualem Rahoui	3000 m steeplechase	8:41.0	7	—		did not advance	

== Boxing ==
Athlete	Event	Round 1	Round 2	Round 3	Round 4	Semi-Final	Final / BM	
Athlete	Event	Opposition Result	Opposition Result	Opposition Result	Opposition Result	Opposition Result	Opposition Result	Rank
Loucif Hamani	−71 kg	Bye	Colon (PUR); W PTS	Richardson (NED); W TKO2	Minter (GBR); L PTS	did not advance		5
