= Rolando Garbey =

Cuban boxer (1947–2023)

Personal information
- Full name: Rolando Garbey Garbey
- Born: 19 November 1947 Santiago de Cuba, Cuba
- Died: 16 December 2023 (aged 76) Havana, Cuba
- Height: 183 cm (6 ft 0 in)
- Weight: 71 kg (157 lb)

Sport
- Sport: Boxing
- Weight class: Light middleweight (-71 kg)
Medal record
Men's boxing
Representing Cuba
Olympic Games
Silver medal – second place	1968 Mexico City	Light middleweight
Bronze medal – third place	1976 Montreal	Light middleweight
World Championships
Gold medal – first place	1974 Havana	Light middleweight
Pan American Games
Gold medal – first place	1967 Winnipeg	Light middleweight
Gold medal – first place	1971 Cali	Light middleweight
Gold medal – first place	1975 Mexico City	Light middleweight
Central American and Caribbean Games
Gold medal – first place	1970 Panama	Light middleweight
Gold medal – first place	1974 Santo Domingo	Light middleweight

Rolando Garbey Garbey (Note: In this Spanish name, the first or paternal surname is Garbey and the second or maternal family name is Garbey.) (19 November 1947 – 16 December 2023) was a Cuban boxer. He competed in the Light Middleweight (71 kg) category. He won an Olympic silver medal in 1968 and a bronze medal in 1976. In 1974, at the inaugural 1974 World Championships in Havana, Cuba, he won the world title. Garbey was also a gold medalist at light middleweight at the Pan-American games in 1967, 1971, and 1975.

Garbey died from a cardiac arrest in Havana, on 16 December 2023, at the age of 76.

== Olympic results ==
Mexico City - 1968

- Quarterfinal: Defeated Eric Blake (Great Britain) by first-round knockout
- Semifinal: Defeated Johnny Baldwin (United States) by decision, 4-1
- Final: Lost to Boris Lagutin (Soviet Union) by decision, 0-5 (was awarded silver medal)

Munich - 1972

- Defeated Ricky Barnor (Ghana) by decision, 5-0
- Defeated Franz Csandl (Austria) by decision, 5-0
- Defeated Jae Keun-Lim (South Korea) by second-round technical knockout
- Lost to Wiesław Rudkowski (Poland) by decision, 1-4

Montreal - 1976

- Round of 32: Defeated Dashnyamyn Olzvoi (Mongolia) by third-round knockout
- Round of 16: Defeated Earl Liburd (Virgin Islands) referee stopped contest in second round
- Quarterfinal: Defeated Kalevi Kosunen (Finland) referee stopped contest in first round
- Semifinal: Lost to Tadija Kačar (Yugoslavia) by decision, 1-4 (was awarded bronze medal)
