= Algeria at the 1968 Summer Olympics =

- IOC code: ALG (AGL used at these Games)
- NOC: Algerian Olympic Committee

in Mexico City
- Competitors: 3 in 2 sports
- Medals: Gold 0 Silver 0 Bronze 0 Total 0

Summer Olympics appearances (overview)
- 1964; 1968; 1972; 1976; 1980; 1984; 1988; 1992; 1996; 2000; 2004; 2008; 2012; 2016; 2020; 2024

Other related appearances
- France (1896–1960)

Algeria competed at the 1968 Summer Olympics in Mexico City, Mexico.

== Boxing ==
| Athlete | Event | Round 1 | Round 2 | Round 3 | Round 4 | Final / BM | |
| Athlete | Event | Opposition Result | Opposition Result | Opposition Result | Opposition Result | Opposition Result | Rank |
|---|---|---|---|---|---|---|---|
| Ali Mebarki | −57 kg | Sourour (MAR); L PTS | did not advance | | | | 17 |
| Rabah Labiod | −67 kg | Luipa (ZAM); L PTS | did not advance | | | | 32 |

== Gymnastics ==
Men's

| Athlete | Event | F | V | PB | HB | R | PH | Final | Rank |
|---|---|---|---|---|---|---|---|---|---|
| Larbi Lazhari | Result | 17.30 | 17.45 | 16.75 | 17.95 | 14.25 | 13.65 | 97.35 | 105 |
| Larbi Lazhari | Rank | 83 | 99 | 102 | 71 | 110 | 108 | 97.35 | 105 |
