= Robbie Davies =

British boxer

Personal information
- Nationality: British
- Born: Robbie Davies; 10 December 1949 Birkenhead, England
- Died: 4 August 2017 (aged 67)
- Height: 5 ft 8 1/2 in (174 cm)
- Weight: Middleweight

Boxing career
- Stance: Orthodox

Boxing record
- Total fights: 15
- Wins: 11
- Win by KO: 10
- Losses: 4
Medal record
Men's amateur boxing
Representing England
Commonwealth Games
Bronze medal – third place	1974 Christchurch	Light-middleweight

Robbie Davies (10 December 1949 – 4 August 2017) was a British professional boxer.

== Amateur career ==
Davies represented England in the light-middleweight division at the 1974 Commonwealth Games, winning a bronze medal.

He represented Great Britain in the men's light-middleweight event at the 1976 Summer Olympics, beating Wayne Devlin of Australia in his opening fight, before losing to Alfredo Lemus of Venezuela in the next round.

In 1977, Davies won the ABA middleweight title, after beating Mike Shone.

== Professional career ==
Davies made his professional debut on 8 September 1977, at the Liverpool Stadium, beating Joe Hannaford.

== Personal life ==
Davies died on 4 August 2017. He had dementia. His son, Robbie Davies Jr., is also a professional boxer.
