= Alan Tottoh =

British boxer

Personal information
- Nationality: British
- Born: 21 October 1944; Manchester, England
- Died: 15 February 2013 (aged 68); Manchester, England

Sport
- Sport: Boxing

Alan Tottoh (21 October 1944 – 15 February 2013) was a British boxer. He competed in the men's welterweight event at the 1968 Summer Olympics. At the 1968 Summer Olympics, he lost to Evangelos Oikonomakos of Greece.
