= Kosunen =

Kosunen is a Finnish surname. Notable people with the surname include:

- Kalevi Kosunen (born 1947), Finnish boxer
- Olli Herman Kosunen (better known as H. Olliver Twisted; born 1983), Finnish singer
