= Kevin Finnegan =

English boxer

Personal information
- Nationality: British
- Born: Kevin Finnegan; 18 April 1948 Iver, Buckinghamshire, England, UK
- Died: 23 October 2008 (aged 60) London
- Weight: Middleweight

Boxing career
- Stance: Orthodox

Boxing record
- Total fights: 47
- Wins: 35
- Win by KO: 13
- Losses: 11
- Draws: 1

Kevin Finnegan (18 April 1948 – 23 October 2008) was an English boxer.

Finnegan's older brother Chris was an Olympic gold medalist and also a professional boxer. Early in his career when Kevin was still an amateur he was banned for 18 months for climbing into the ring to dispute a loss his brother had suffered. He was well known for a trilogy of fights against Alan Minter; although he lost all three, they were close point decisions.

He won the British Middleweight title on three occasions, and was a two-time European Middleweight champion. Finnegan twice fought future undisputed world champion Marvin Hagler, losing by a technical knockout on both occasions. Hagler later referred to Finnegan as the toughest man he had ever fought. He also held wins over Tony Sibson and Gratien Tonna. His career lasted from 1970 to 1980 and he had 47 fights, winning 35, losing 11 and drawing one.

Finnegan died of heart disease on 23 October 2008, at his home in Hillingdon.

== Professional boxing record ==
35 Wins (13 knockouts, 22 decisions), 11 Losses (5 knockouts, 6 decisions), 1 Draw Archived 29 August 2012 at the Wayback Machine
Result	Record	Opponent	Type	Round	Date	Location	Notes
Loss	21-0	Matteo Salvemini	PTS	12	1980-09-10	Ariston Cinema, Sanremo, Italy	EBU Middleweight Title.
Draw	16-1-1	Georg Steinherr	PTS	12	1980-05-14	Olympiahalle, Munich	EBU Middleweight Title.
Win	44-7	Gratien Tonna	PTS	12	1980-02-07	Stade Pierre de Coubertin, Bercy	EBU Middleweight Title.
Win	33-2-1	Tony Sibson	PTS	15	1979-11-06	Royal Albert Hall, Kensington, London	BBBofC British Middleweight Title.
Win	15-8-1	Abel Cordoba	PTS	8	1979-05-29	Royal Albert Hall, Kensington, London	
Loss	14-1	Charlie Weir	TKO	7	1979-02-03	Ellis Park Tennis Stadium, Johannesburg	
Loss	24-0	Ayub Kalule	UD	10	1978-12-07	K.B. Hallen, Copenhagen	95-100, 95-100, 93-100.
Win	12-4-2	Bob Patterson	PTS	8	1978-09-26	Empire Pool, Wembley, London	
Loss	39-2-1	Marvin Hagler	TKO	7	1978-05-13	Boston Garden, Boston, Massachusetts	
Loss	37-2-1	Marvin Hagler	TKO	9	1978-03-04	Boston Garden, Boston, Massachusetts	
Loss	28-6	Alan Minter	PTS	15	1977-11-08	Empire Pool, Wembley, London	BBBofC British Middleweight Title. 143-144.
Win	16-6-3	Karl Vinson	PTS	10	1977-09-27	Empire Pool, Wembley, London	
Win	6-3	Frankie Lucas	TKO	11	1977-05-31	Royal Albert Hall, Kensington, London	BBBofC British Middleweight Title.
Win	14-6	Alex Tompkins	PTS	8	1976-12-07	Royal Albert Hall, Kensington, London	
Win	12-15-3	Oscar Angus	PTS	8	1976-11-15	York Hall, Bethnal Green, London	
Loss	23-4	Alan Minter	PTS	15	1976-09-14	Royal Albert Hall, Kensington, London	BBBofC British Middleweight Title.
Win	21-1	Freddy De Kerpel	KO	9	1976-04-10	Liege, Belgium	
Win	11-8-3	Oscar Angus	PTS	8	1976-03-15	Hilton Hotel, Mayfair, London	80-78.5.
Win	7-3-1	Danny McCafferty	TKO	4	1976-02-25	York Hall, Bethnal Green, London	
Loss	19-4	Alan Minter	PTS	15	1975-11-04	Empire Pool, Wembley, London	BBBofC British Middleweight Title.
Loss	35-4	Gratien Tonna	PTS	15	1975-05-07	Stade Louis II, Monte Carlo, Monaco	EBU Middleweight Title.
Win	22-3-2	Frank Reiche	PTS	10	1974-11-12	Empire Pool, Wembley, London	
Win	46-18-9	Eddie Mazon	TKO	9	1974-10-29	Royal Albert Hall, Kensington, London	
Win	63-5-1	Jean-Claude Bouttier	UD	15	1974-05-27	Stade Roland Garros, Paris	EBU Middleweight Title.
Win	28-13-4	Bunny Sterling	PTS	15	1974-02-11	Hilton Hotel, Mayfair, London	BBBofC British Middleweight Title. 148-146.5.
Win	19-14-3	Frank Young	PTS	8	1973-12-03	Anglo-American Sporting Club, Mayfair, London	79.5-77.5.
Win	3-1-1	Bob Murphy	TKO	4	1973-10-23	Anglo-American Sporting Club, Southend	
Win	22-14-4	Ronnie Hough	KO	8	1973-05-07	Hilton Hotel, Mayfair, London	Hough knocked out at 1:07 of the eighth round.
Win	15-1-2	Alvin Anderson	PTS	8	1973-03-27	Royal Albert Hall, Kensington, London	40-38.75.
Win	11-2	Leon Washington	TKO	7	1973-03-12	Grosvenor House Hotel, Mayfair, London	
Win	13-0	Pat McCann	PTS	12	1973-01-17	Hilton Hotel, Mayfair, London	BBBofC Southern Area Middleweight Title. 59.5-58.5.
Win	22-14-1	Carlos Marks	PTS	8	1972-11-14	Empire Pool, Wembley, London	39.75-38.75.
Win	19-17-2	Len Gibbs	RTD	6	1972-10-17	Hilton Hotel, Mayfair, London	
Win	12-7	Dave Cranswick	TKO	3	1972-09-12	Shoreditch Town Hall, Shoreditch, London	
Loss	27-14-5	Don McMillan	TKO	5	1972-05-24	Sporting Club, Bedford	BBBofC British Middleweight Title Eliminator.
Win	13-5	Eric Blake	PTS	10	1972-04-10	National Sporting Club, Piccadilly, London]	BBBofC Southern Area Middleweight Title/British Middleweight Title Eliminator.
Win	14-24-6	Tommy Bell	PTS	8	1972-03-13	Anglo-American Sporting Club, Mayfair, London	
Win	38-28-6	Harry Scott	PTS	10	1972-02-15	Royal Albert Hall, Kensington, London	BBBofC British Middleweight Title Eliminator. 49.25-48.5.
Win	29-6-2	Patrick Dwyer	PTS	8	1971-11-16	Empire Pool, Wembley, London	
Win	13-1-1	Mick O'Neill	TKO	6	1971-09-27	Empire Pool, Wembley, London	
Loss	19-7-3	Ronnie Hough	TKO	2	1971-06-14	Anglo-American Sporting Club, Mayfair, London	
Win	33-15-2	Dick Duffy	PTS	8	1971-04-27	Royal Albert Hall, Kensington, London	
Win	22-13-2	Clive Cook	PTS	8	1971-04-06	Royal Albert Hall, Kensington, London	
Win	2-7-1	Dave Ivory	TKO	4	1971-02-10	York Hall, Bethnal Green, London	
Win	7-9-1	Gerald Gooding	PTS	6	1971-01-25	Anglo-American Sporting Club, Piccadilly, London	
Win	11-10-3	Maurice Thomas	TKO	6	1970-12-08	Royal Albert Hall, Kensington, London	
Win	10-16-2	Billy Deasy	TKO	4	1970-11-23	Anglo-American Sporting Club, Mayfair, London	

== See also ==
- List of British middleweight boxing champions
- List of European Boxing Union middleweight champions

Regional boxing titles
Preceded by Jean-Claude Bouttier	European middleweight champion 27 May 1974 – 7 May 1975	Succeeded by Gratien Tonna
Vacant Title last held by Alan Minter	British middleweight champion 31 May – 8 November 1977	Succeeded by Alan Minter
Preceded by Tony Sibson	British middleweight champion 6 November 1979 – January 1981; Retired	Vacant Title next held by Roy Gumbs
Vacant Title last held by Alan Minter	European middleweight champion 7 February – 10 October 1980	Succeeded by Matteo Salvemino
