= Vladimir Musalimov =

Soviet boxer (1944–2013)

- Musalimov in 1967

Personal information
- Born: 31 December 1944 Moscow, Soviet Union
- Died: 3 November 2013 (aged 68) Luhansk, Ukraine
- Height: 181 cm (5 ft 11 in)
- Weight: 67 kg (148 lb)

Sport
- Sport: Boxing
- Club: Armed Forces sports society
Medal record
Representing the Soviet Union
Olympic Games
Bronze medal – third place	1968 Mexico City	-67 kg
European Amateur Championships
Bronze medal – third place	1969 Bucharest	-67 kg

Vladimir Andreyevich Musalimov (31 December 1944 – 3 November 2013) was a Soviet amateur welterweight boxer. He won bronze medals at the 1968 Olympics and 1969 European Championships and a silver medal at the 1971 World Army Championships. Musalimov was the Soviet champion in 1967–69.

== Career ==
Musalimov was born in Moscow, but as a result of the Stalin's repressions his family was relocated to Kazakhstan, where he started to train in boxing. In 1960 together with his coach he moved to Kyiv, Ukraine. In 1963–67 he studied in a military school there and until 1973 competed for the Armed Forces sports society. At the 1968 Olympics he won his first three bouts, but injured a finger in the third one, and lost the fourth bout to the eventual gold medalist Manfred Wolke.

Musalimov was a career military officer. In 1973–1978 he served as a battalion commander on Sakhalin and later fought in the Soviet–Afghan War, receiving the Medal for Battle Merit. Then he was stationed in Magdeburg with the Group of Soviet Forces in Germany and in 1986 was sent to Luhansk, Ukraine, where he lived until his death in 2013. He retired from the Soviet Army in 1990 in the rank of colonel, and in 1991–2005 worked as a boxing coach and referee.
