= Cameroon at the 1968 Summer Olympics =

- IOC code: CMR
- NOC: Cameroon Olympic and Sports Committee

in Mexico City
- Medals Ranked 39th: Gold 0 Silver 1 Bronze 0 Total 1

Summer Olympics appearances (overview)
- 1964; 1968; 1972; 1976; 1980; 1984; 1988; 1992; 1996; 2000; 2004; 2008; 2012; 2016; 2020; 2024

Cameroon competed at the 1968 Summer Olympics in Mexico City, Mexico.

== Medalists ==
Medal	Name	Sport	Event
Silver medal	Joseph Bessala	Boxing	Welterweight
