= Gebregiorgis =

Gebregiorgis is an Ethiopian surname. Notable people with the surname include:

- Genet Gebregiorgis (born 1977), Ethiopian runner
- Tadesse Gebregiorgis (born 1938), Ethiopian boxer
