= Harry Scott (boxer) =

British boxer (1937–2015)

Personal information
- Nationality: English
- Born: 27 October 1937 Liverpool, Merseyside, England
- Died: 16 December 2015 (aged 78) Liverpool
- Height: 1.73 m (5 ft 8 in)
- Weight: Middleweight

Boxing career
- Stance: Orthodox

Boxing record
- Total fights: 79
- Wins: 39
- Win by KO: 20
- Losses: 34
- Draws: 6

Harry Scott (27 October 1937 – 16 December 2015) was a British boxer and contender in the middleweight division during the 1960s.

Scott started off as an amateur winning the bronze medal at the 1959 European Boxing Championships in Lucerne.

Scott turned professional in 1960.

He never fought for the British title, losing three final eliminators. Yet his ability was widely recognised, and he fought around the world, facing four past or future world champions, including Emile Griffith and Alan Minter.

But he is best known for his two contests in 1965 at the Royal Albert Hall against Rubin "Hurricane" Carter, who had fought for the world title the previous December. In their first meeting in March, Carter was awarded the victory on cuts in the ninth round despite trailing on points, only to be outpointed six weeks later, in what Boxing News declared to be one of the finest victories by a British boxer in the previous 20 years.

ITV made a documentary about Scott called "Come Out Fighting" in 1967. It included segments of Scott's family life and his boxing career.

Scott retired in 1973.

Following Scott's retirement he went on to be a Green Grocer. Scott had two children.

== Professional boxing record ==
39 Wins (20 knockouts, 19 decisions), 34 Losses (5 knockout, 29 decisions), 6 Draw Archived 14 October 2012 at the Wayback Machine
Result	Record	Opponent	Type	Round	Date	Location	Notes
Loss	5-1-1	(United Kingdom) Trevor Francis	TKO	7	13 Jun 1973	(England) Wolverhampton Civic Hall, Wolverhampton, West Midlands, United Kingdom	Referee John Coyle
Loss	8-0-0	(United Kingdom) Alan Minter	PTS	8	13 Mar 1973	(England) Empire Pool, Wembley, London, United Kingdom	Referee Mike Jacobs
Loss	7-3-0	(United Kingdom) Maxie Smith	TKO	5	24 Jan 1973	(England) Trentham Gardens, Stoke-on-Trent, Staffordshire, United Kingdom	
Loss	16-2-0	(South Africa) Jan Kies	PTS	10	10 Jun 1972	Portuguese Hall, Johannesburg, Gauteng, South Africa	
Win	22-10-0	(Republic of Biafra) Cyclone Barth	PTS	8	24 Apr 1972	Sporting Club, Bedford, Bedfordshire, United Kingdom	
Loss	12-5-0	(United Kingdom) Eric Blake	PTS	8	9 Mar 1972	Cliffs Pavilion, Southend, Essex, United Kingdom	
Loss	8-1-0	(United Kingdom) Kevin Finnegan	PTS	10	15 Feb 1972	(England) Royal Albert Hall, Kensington, London, United Kingdom	
Loss	15-5-2	(Trinidad and Tobago) Matt Donovan	PTS	8	20 Dec 1971	Palais des Sports, Paris, France	
Won	11-3-0	(United Kingdom) Eric Blake	PTS	8	5 Oct 1971	(England) Royal Albert Hall, Kensington, London, United Kingdom	
Won	24-13-7	(France) William Poitrimol	PTS	8	18 May 1971	(England) Liverpool, Merseyside, United Kingdom	
Won	33-14-2	(Wales) Dick Duffy	PTS	8	5 Apr 1971	(England) National Sporting Club, Piccadilly, London, United Kingdom	
Draw	18-8-3	(Ghana) Teddy Meho	PTS	8	22 Mar 1971	(England) Bloomsbury, London, United Kingdom	
Won	18-12-0	(Jamaica) Clarence Cassius	PTS	8	2 Feb 1971	(England) Streatham, London, United Kingdom	Referee Sid Nathan
Loss	21-3-1	(Denmark) Tom Jensen	PTS	8	8 Oct 1970	K.B. Hallen, Copenhagen, Denmark	
Loss	20-1-1	(South Africa) Pierre Fourie	PTS	10	11 Jul 1970	Wembley Ice Rink, Johannesburg, Gauteng, South Africa	Referee Stanley Christodoulou
Loss	15-9-2	(Jamaica) Bunny Sterling	PTS	12	11 May 1970	(England) Nottingham, Nottinghamshire, United Kingdom	
Loss	57-3-0	(Italy) Sandro Mazzinghi	PTS	10	18 Apr 1970	Palazzetto dello Sport, Bologna, Italy	
Win	14-3-1	(Wales) Carl Thomas	TKO	9	9 Mar 1970	(England) Center Hotel, London, United Kingdom	Referee Harry Gibbs
Loss	7-1-0	(United Kingdom) (Republic of Ireland) Chris Finnegan	PTS	10	8 Dec 1969	(England) Anglo-American Sporting Club, Mayfair, London, United Kingdom	Referee Bill White
Win	17-11-0	(Republic of Ireland) Henry Turkington	TKO	1	6 Oct 1969	(England) Premier Sporting Club, Kensington, London, United Kingdom	Benny Caplan
Win	14-7-1	(Jamaica) Bunny Sterling	PTS	8	24 Apr 1969	(England) Royal Garden Hotel, Kensington, London, United Kingdom	
Won	13-1-1	(Denmark) Tom Jensen	PTS	6	6 Mar 1969	K.B. Hallen, Copenhagen, Denmark	
Win	11-14-2	(United States) Tommy Bell	PTS	8	11 Nov 1968	(England) Colston Hall, Bristol, United Kingdom	Referee Harry Humphreys
Loss	19-2-1	(United Kingdom) Les McAteer	PTS	12	17 Sep 1968	(England) The Stadium, Liverpool, Merseyside, United Kingdom	
Won	16-8-0	(Jamaica) Clarence Cassius	TKO	4	26 May 1968	(England) Hilton Hotel, Mayfair, London, United Kingdom	
Win	9-1-0	(United Kingdom) Bill Robinson	TKO	7	18 Apr 1968	(England) Manor Place Baths, Walworth, London, United Kingdom	
Draw	36-18-2	(United States) Johnny Kramer	PTS	8	12 Dec 1967	(England) Civic Hall, Wolverhampton, West Midlands, United Kingdom	
Win	7-2-3	(United States) Larry Brown	TKO	1	22 Aug 1967	(England) Civic Hall, Wolverhampton, West Midlands, United Kingdom	
Win	9-4-1	(Uruguay) Ruben Orrico	PTS	10	11 Jul 1967	(England) The Stadium, Liverpool, Merseyside, United Kingdom	
Loss	28-0-0	(Denmark) Tom Bogs	PTS	10	6 Apr 1967	K.B. Hallen, Copenhagen, Denmark	
Loss	16-07-1	(Republic of Ireland) Henry Turkington	PTS	8	4 Mar 1967	Ulster Hall, Belfast, Northern Ireland, United Kingdom	
Loss	35-05-7	(Argentina) Juan Carlos Duran	PTS	10	3 Feb 1967	Palazzetto dello Sport, Bologna, Italy	
Win	10-08-3	(Saint Kitts) Johnny Hendrickson	PTS	8	18 Jan 1967	(England) Grosvenor House, Mayfair, London, United Kingdom	
Loss	65-01-0	(Italy) Nino Benvenuti	PTS	10	23 Sep 1966	Palazzetto dello Sport, Bologna, Italy	
Win	59-32-0	(Dominican Republic) Sugar Boy Nando	PTS	10	18 Mar 1966	Masshallen, Gothenburg, Sweden	
Loss	13-6-1	(United Kingdom) Willie Hart	PTS	10	1 Nov 1965	(England) Free Trade Hall, Manchester, United Kingdom	
Loss	46-7-0	(United States) Emile Griffith	RTD	7	4 Oct 1965	(England) Royal Albert Hall, Kensington, London, United Kingdom	

Career Record:
