= Marco Scano =

Italian boxer

Personal information
- Nationality: Italian
- Born: 25 April 1945 (age 79); Cagliari, Italy

Sport
- Sport: Boxing

Marco Scano (born 25 April 1945) is an Italian boxer. He competed in the men's welterweight event at the 1968 Summer Olympics. At the 1968 Summer Olympics, he lost to Alfonso Ramírez of Mexico.
