= Dieter Kottysch =

German boxer (1943–2017)

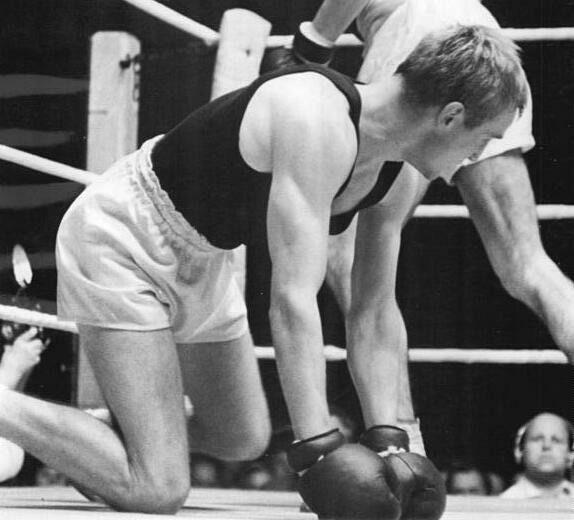
- Kottysch in an Olympic qualification boxing match in 1964

Personal information
- Born: 30 June 1943 Gleiwitz, Germany
- Died: 9 April 2017 (aged 73) Hamburg, Germany
- Height: 176 cm (5 ft 9 in)
- Weight: 70 kg (154 lb)

Sport
- Sport: Boxing
- Club: BC Sportmann, Hamburg
Medal record
Representing West Germany
Olympic Games
Gold medal – first place	1972 Munich	-71 kg

Dieter Kottysch (30 June 1943 – 9 April 2017) was a German amateur middleweight boxer; he competed for West Germany in the 1968 and 1972 Olympics and won a gold medal in 1972.

== 1968 Olympic results ==
Below are the results of Dieter Kottysch, a West German welterweight boxer who competed at the 1968 Mexico City Olympic tournament:

- Round of 64: defeated Mauri Saarivainio (Finland) referee stopped contest
- Round of 32: lost to Vladimir Musalimov (Soviet Union) by decision, 0-5

== 1972 Olympic results ==
Below are the results of Dieter Kottysch who competed as a light middleweight boxer for West Germany at the 1972 Olympic tournament in Munich:

- Round of 64: bye
- Round of 32: defeated Bonifacio Ávila (Colombia) with a second-round technical knockout
- Round of 16: defeated Evangelos Oikonomakos (Greece) on points, 5-0
- Quarterfinal: defeated Mohamed Majeri (Tunisia) on points, 5-0
- Semifinal: defeated Alan Minter (Great Britain) on points, 3-2
- Final: defeated Wiesław Rudkowski (Poland) on points, 3-2 (won gold medal)
