= Vasile Didea =

Romanian boxer

Personal information
- Nationality: Romanian
- Born: 1 April 1954 (age 70); Băile Herculane, Romania

Sport
- Sport: Boxing

Vasile Didea (born 1 April 1954) is a Romanian boxer. He competed in the men's light middleweight event at the 1976 Summer Olympics. At the 1976 Summer Olympics, he defeated Michael Prevost and Nayden Stanchev, before losing to Tadija Kačar.
