= Tadija Kačar =

Yugoslavian boxer

Medal record

Men's boxing

Representing Yugoslavia

Olympic Games
Silver medal – second place	1976 Montreal	Light Middleweight

World Amateur Championships
Silver medal – second place	1978 Belgrade	Light Heavyweight

European Amateur Championships
Silver medal – second place	1979 Cologne	Light Heavyweight

Mediterranean Games
Gold medal – first place	1979 Split	Middleweight

Tadija Kačar (born 5 January 1956 in Peručica, near Jajce, Bosnia and Herzegovina) is a retired Bosnian Serb boxer who represented Yugoslavia at the 1976 Summer Olympics in Montréal, Canada. There he won the silver medal in the light middleweight division (– 71 kg), after being defeated in the final by Poland's Jerzy Rybicki.

Tadija Kačar captured the silver medal at the second World Championships in Belgrade in 1978. He is the older brother of boxer Slobodan Kačar, who won a gold medal at the 1980 Summer Olympics.

== Olympic results ==
- Defeated Poul Frandsen (Denmark), 5:0
- Defeated Mohammad Azarhazin (Iran), 5:0
- Defeated Vasile Didea (Romania), 5:0
- Defeated Rolando Garbey (Cuba), 4:1
- Lost to Jerzy Rybicki (Poland), 5:0
