= Alan Minter =

English boxer (1951–2020)

- Minter in 1980

Personal information
- Nicknames: Boom Boom, Minty
- Nationality: British
- Born: 17 August 1951 Penge, Bromley, London, England
- Died: 9 September 2020 (aged 69) Guildford, Surrey, England
- Height: 5’10”
- Weight: Middleweight

Boxing career
- Reach: 71 in (180 cm)
- Stance: Southpaw

Boxing record
- Total fights: 49
- Wins: 39
- Win by KO: 23
- Losses: 9
- No contests: 1
Medal record
Men's amateur boxing
Representing Great Britain
Olympic Games
| Bronze medal – third place | 1972 Munich | Light-middleweight |

Alan Sydney Minter (17 August 1951 – 9 September 2020) was an English professional boxer who competed from 1972 to 1981. He held the undisputed middleweight title in 1980, having previously held the British middleweight title from 1975 to 1976, and the European middleweight title twice between 1977 and 1979. As an amateur, Minter won a bronze medal in the light-middleweight division at the 1972 Summer Olympics.

== Early life ==
Minter was born in Penge, South East London, to Syd and Anne Minter. His father was a plasterer, and his mother was of German birth. His family moved to Crawley, West Sussex, and he joined Crawley Boxing Club at aged 11, training under John Hillier and Dougie Bidwell. Minter attended Hazelwick School.

== Amateur career ==
Minter took part at the 1970 European Junior Championships at the middleweight division, but in the very first fight he was stopped in the 2-nd round by Vyacheslav Lemeshev (USSR). Because Minter was the 1971 Amateur Boxing Association of England Middleweight Champion, he was selected to box for UK in the Olympics 1972. He won a bronze medal at the 1972 Munich Olympic Games in the light-middleweight classification, losing in the semifinal to Dieter Kottysch of West Germany by a 3-2 marginal decision which was hotly disputed. Kottysch went on to win the gold medal.

=== 1972 Olympic results ===
Minter's results at the 1972 Munich Olympics are as follows:

- Round of 64: bye
- Round of 32: Defeated Reggie Ford (Guyana) by second-round knockout
- Round of 16: Defeated Valeri Tregubov (Soviet Union) by decision, 5–0
- Quarterfinal: Defeated Loucif Hamani (Algeria) by decision, 4–1
- Semifinal: Lost to Dieter Kottysch (West Germany) by decision, 2–3 (was awarded bronze medal)

== Professional career ==
Minter began his professional career with 11 straight wins, the first against Maurice Thomas in London on 31 October 1972, winning by knockout in the 6th round. Minter won his first five fights by knockout until 16 January 1973, when Pat Dwyer went the distance, Minter taking the fight on points. Minter won his next five fights, three by knockout, before being defeated for the first time after the referee stopped the fight in the eighth round against "Scottish" Don McMillan due to bad cuts suffered by Minter. Two more wins followed before facing Jan Magdziarz, who beat him twice in a row (once in the eighth and once in the sixth) again due to cuts.

1974 was a mixed year for Minter, beating Tony Byrne by a decision in eight, losing in two to Ricky Torres (again on cuts), having a third fight with Magdziarz, resulting in a no contest, closing the year with a win against Shako Mamba in Hamburg, Germany.

In 1975, he won four fights in a row, including another bout in Hamburg and, by the end of the year, he challenged Kevin Finnegan for the British Middleweight title, winning it by a 15-round decision.

In 1976, he won six fights, to extend his streak to ten consecutive wins. Among the boxers he beat were Billy Knight by a knockout and Finnegan once again, by decision in 15, both in defence of his British title, along with former world title challenger Tony Licata, knocked out in six and United States Olympic Games Gold medal winner Sugar Ray Seales, in five rounds. These wins gave Minter a ranking among the top ten Middleweight challengers.

In 1977, he won the European Middleweight title by beating Germano Valsecchi by a knockout in five in Italy. But in his next fight his winning streak ended when he lost to former world title challenger Ronnie Harris by a knockout in eight. Minter returned to top ten challenger status by upsetting the former World Welterweight and Light Middleweight Champion Emile Griffith with a ten-round decision win in Monte Carlo, but then he lost his European title to Gratien Tonna by a knockout in eight at Milan. He closed 1977 with a third 15-round decision win over Finnegan to retain his British title.

1978 was a sad year for Minter, although he won all three of his bouts. On 15 February, on the undercard of the first Muhammad Ali vs. Leon Spinks fight in Las Vegas, Nevada, he won his first bout in the United States by knocking out Sandy Torres in five rounds. Then, in July, he went to Italy once again to regain his European Middleweight title by knocking out Angelo Jacopucci in twelve rounds. Jacopucci died a few days afterwards, due to injuries sustained in the bout, and Minter considered quitting boxing. Minter finished his year by avenging his loss to Tonna with a six-round knockout in November at Wembley.

In 1979, Minter won all four of his fights, two of them by knockout. On 16 March 1980, in Las Vegas, he was given a shot at World Middleweight Champion Vito Antuofermo's title at Caesars Palace. He won the title by a 15-round split decision in which the judges' scorecards varied wildly. A Venezuelan judge had Minter losing the fight, while the British judge (Roland Dakin) had Minter winning 13 of the 15 rounds. In a rematch held three months later in London on 28 June, Minter retained the world title by a TKO in eight rounds.

On 27 September 1980, Minter's short run as world champion came to an abrupt end when he was stopped on cuts in the third round against 'Marvelous' Marvin Hagler at Wembley Arena in London. The fight was controversial owing to a racially-charged remark Minter made during the build-up (Minter was alleged to have said that he did not "intend to lose his title to a black man", though he insisted that he had actually said that he didn't intend to lose to "that" black man, and had been goaded to say so by his promoters) and then by a crowd riot once the referee had agreed with Minter's corner that he was unable to continue, with chairs, bottles and glasses being hurled into the ring after the decision.

Minter beat fringe contender Ernie Singletary in London, in 1981, but after losses to future Hagler challengers Mustafa Hamsho in Las Vegas and Tony Sibson in London, he retired for good.

He left boxing with a record of 39 wins, 9 losses and 1 no contest, with 23 wins by knockout.

== Death ==
Minter died of cancer in September 2020, in Guildford at the age of 69.

== Professional boxing record ==
| 49 fights | 39 wins | 9 losses |
|---|---|---|
| By knockout | 23 | 8 |
| By decision | 16 | 1 |
| No contests | 1 | |

| No. | Result | Record | Opponent | Type | Round, time | Date | Location | Notes |
|---|---|---|---|---|---|---|---|---|
| 49 | Loss | 39–9 (1) | Tony Sibson | TKO | 3 (12), 1:59 | 15 Sep 1981 | Wembley Arena, London, England | For European middleweight title |
| 48 | Loss | 39–8 (1) | Mustafa Hamsho | SD | 10 | 6 Jun 1981 | Caesars Palace, Paradise, Nevada, US | |
| 47 | Win | 39–7 (1) | Ernie Singletary | PTS | 10 | 17 Mar 1981 | Wembley Arena, London, England | |
| 46 | Loss | 38–7 (1) | Marvin Hagler | TKO | 3 (15), 1:45 | 27 Sep 1980 | Wembley Arena, London, England | Lost WBA, WBC, and The Ring middleweight titles |
| 45 | Win | 38–6 (1) | Vito Antuofermo | RTD | 8 (15) | 28 Jun 1980 | Wembley Arena, London, England | Retained WBA, WBC, and The Ring middleweight titles |
| 44 | Win | 37–6 (1) | Vito Antuofermo | SD | 15 | 16 Mar 1980 | Caesars Palace, Paradise, Nevada, US | Won WBA, WBC, and The Ring middleweight titles |
| 43 | Win | 36–6 (1) | Doug Demmings | PTS | 10 | 23 Oct 1979 | Wembley Conference Centre, London, England | |
| 42 | Win | 35–6 (1) | Monty Betham | TKO | 2 (10), 1:05 | 26 Jun 1979 | Wembley Arena, London, England | |
| 41 | Win | 34–6 (1) | Renato Garcia | TKO | 9 (10), 2:40 | 1 May 1979 | Wembley Arena, London, England | |
| 40 | Win | 33–6 (1) | Rudy Robles | PTS | 10 | 6 Feb 1979 | Wembley Conference Centre, London, England | |
| 39 | Win | 32–6 (1) | Gratien Tonna | RTD | 6 (15) | 7 Nov 1978 | Empire Pool, London, England | Retained European middleweight title |
| 38 | Win | 31–6 (1) | Angelo Jacopucci | KO | 12 (15) | 19 Jul 1978 | Municipal Stadium, Bellaria, Italy | Won vacant European middleweight title Jacopucci died of injuries sustained in this bout. |
| 37 | Win | 30–6 (1) | Sandy Torres | KO | 5 (10), 1:57 | 15 Feb 1978 | Las Vegas Hilton, Winchester, Nevada, US | |
| 36 | Win | 29–6 (1) | Kevin Finnegan | PTS | 15 | 8 Nov 1977 | Empire Pool, London, England | Won vacant British middleweight title |
| 35 | Loss | 28–6 (1) | Gratien Tonna | TKO | 8 (15), 1:10 | 21 Sep 1977 | Palasport di San Siro, Milan, Italy | Lost European middleweight title |
| 34 | Win | 28–5 (1) | Emile Griffith | PTS | 10 | 30 Jul 1977 | Stade Louis II, Monte Carlo, Monaco | |
| 33 | Loss | 27–5 (1) | Ronnie Harris | TKO | 8 (10), 3:00 | 12 Apr 1977 | Royal Albert Hall, London, England | |
| 32 | Win | 27–4 (1) | Germano Valsecchi | KO | 5 (15) | 4 Feb 1977 | Palasport di San Siro, Milan, Italy | Won European middleweight title |
| 31 | Win | 26–4 (1) | Sugar Ray Seales | TKO | 5 (10), 2:14 | 7 Dec 1976 | Royal Albert Hall, London, England | |
| 30 | Win | 25–4 (1) | Tony Licata | TKO | 6 (10), 1:30 | 9 Nov 1976 | Empire Pool, London, England | |
| 29 | Win | 24–4 (1) | Kevin Finnegan | PTS | 15 | 14 Sep 1976 | Royal Albert Hall, London, England | Retained British middleweight title |
| 28 | Win | 23–4 (1) | Frank Reiche | TKO | 8 (10) | 24 May 1976 | Olympiahalle, Munich, West Germany | |
| 27 | Win | 22–4 (1) | Billy Knight | TKO | 2 (15), 3:00 | 27 Apr 1976 | Royal Albert Hall, London, England | Retained British middleweight title |
| 26 | Win | 21–4 (1) | Trevor Francis | TKO | 8 (10), 1:05 | 20 Jan 1976 | Royal Albert Hall, London, England | |
| 25 | Win | 20–4 (1) | Kevin Finnegan | PTS | 15 | 4 Nov 1975 | Empire Pool, London, England | Won vacant British middleweight title |
| 24 | Win | 19–4 (1) | Peter Wulf | KO | 6 (10) | 30 May 1975 | Hamburg, West Germany | |
| 23 | Win | 18–4 (1) | Larry Paul | PTS | 10 | 25 Mar 1975 | Royal Albert Hall, London, England | |
| 22 | Win | 17–4 (1) | Tony Allen | PTS | 8 | 10 Feb 1975 | Hilton on Park Lane, London, England | |
| 21 | Win | 16–4 (1) | Henry Cooper | KO | 1 (8), 2:25 | 20 Jan 1975 | Hilton on Park Lane, London, England | |
| 20 | Win | 15–4 (1) | Shako Mamba | PTS | 8 | 30 Nov 1974 | Munich, West Germany | |
| 19 | NC | 14–4 (1) | Jan Magdziarz | NC | 4 (10) | 29 Oct 1974 | Royal Albert Hall, London, England | NC after both boxers were disqualified for inactivity |
| 18 | Loss | 14–4 | Ricky Ortiz | TKO | 2 (10) | 21 May 1974 | Empire Pool, London, England | |
| 17 | Win | 14–3 | Tony Byrne | PTS | 8 | 26 Mar 1974 | Royal Albert Hall, London, England | |
| 16 | Loss | 13–3 | Jan Magdziarz | RTD | 6 (8) | 11 Dec 1973 | Royal Albert Hall, London, England | |
| 15 | Loss | 13–2 | Jan Magdziarz | TKO | 3 (8) | 30 Oct 1973 | Royal Albert Hall, London, England | |
| 14 | Win | 13–1 | Ernie Burns | TKO | 5 (8) | 2 Oct 1973 | Royal Albert Hall, London, England | |
| 13 | Win | 12–1 | Octavio Romero | PTS | 8 | 10 Sep 1973 | Empire Pool, London, England | |
| 12 | Loss | 11–1 | Don McMillan | TKO | 8 (8), 0:45 | 5 Jun 1973 | Royal Albert Hall, London, England | |
| 11 | Win | 11–0 | George Aidoo | TKO | 5 (8) | 9 May 1973 | York Hall, London, England | |
| 10 | Win | 10–0 | Frank Young | PTS | 8 | 27 Mar 1973 | Royal Albert Hall, London, England | |
| 9 | Win | 9–0 | Harry Scott | PTS | 8 | 13 Mar 1973 | Empire Pool, London, England | |
| 8 | Win | 8–0 | Gabe Bowens | TKO | 7 (8), 1:55 | 20 Feb 1973 | Royal Albert Hall, London, England | |
| 7 | Win | 7–0 | Pat Brogan | TKO | 7 (8) | 30 Jan 1973 | York Hall, London, England | |
| 6 | Win | 6–0 | Pat Dwyer | PTS | 8 | 16 Jan 1973 | Royal Albert Hall, London, England | |
| 5 | Win | 5–0 | Mike McCluskie | KO | 5 (8) | 8 Jan 1973 | Piccadilly Hotel, Manchester, England | |
| 4 | Win | 4–0 | Ronnie Hough | TKO | 5 (8) | 11 Dec 1972 | Hilton on Park Lane, London, England | |
| 3 | Win | 3–0 | Anton Schnedl | TKO | 7 (8) | 5 Dec 1972 | Royal Albert Hall, London, England | |
| 2 | Win | 2–0 | John Lowe | TKO | 3 (6) | 14 Nov 1972 | Empire Pool, London, England | |
| 1 | Win | 1–0 | Maurice Thomas | TKO | 6 (6) | 31 Oct 1972 | Royal Albert Hall, London, England | |

== Titles in boxing ==
=== Major world titles ===
- WBA middleweight champion (160 lbs)
- WBC middleweight champion (160 lbs)

=== The Ring magazine titles ===
- The Ring middleweight champion (160 lbs)

=== Regional/International titles ===
- Lonsdale Belt middleweight champion (160 lbs)
- British middleweight champion (160 lbs) (2×)
- European middleweight champion (160 lbs) (2×)

=== Undisputed titles ===
- Undisputed middleweight champion

== See also ==
- List of middleweight boxing champions
- List of WBC world champions

Sporting positions
Amateur boxing titles
| Previous: John Conteh | ABA middleweight champion 1971 | Next: Frank Lucas |
Regional boxing titles
| Vacant Title last held by Bunny Sterling | British middleweight champion 4 November 1975 – 1977; Vacated | Vacant Title next held by Kevin Finnegan |
| Preceded by Germano Valsecchi | European middleweight champion 4 February 1977 – 21 September 1977 | Succeeded by Gratien Tonna |
| Preceded by Kevin Finnegan | British middleweight champion 8 November 1977 – 1979; Vacated | Vacant Title next held by Kevin Finnegan |
| Vacant Title last held by Gratien Tonna | European middleweight champion 19 July 1978 – 1980; Vacated | Vacant Title next held by Kevin Finnegan |
World boxing titles
| Preceded by Vito Antuofermo | WBA middleweight champion 16 March 1980 – 27 September 1980 | Succeeded by Marvin Hagler |
| Preceded by Vito Antuofermo | WBC middleweight champion 16 March 1980 – 27 September 1980 | Succeeded by Marvin Hagler |
| Preceded by Vito Antuofermo | The Ring middleweight champion 16 March 1980 – 27 September 1980 | Succeeded by Marvin Hagler |
| Preceded by Vito Antuofermo | Undisputed middleweight champion 16 March 1980 – 27 September 1980 | Succeeded by Marvin Hagler |
