= Celal Sandal =

Turkish boxer (1942–2006)

Personal information
- Born: 12 March 1942 Kayseri, Turkey
- Weight: welterweight

Boxing career

Celal Sandal (12 March 1942, Kayseri – 12 December 2006, Ankara) was a Turkish welterweight boxer.

He participated in the 1968 Olympics, defeating Ghanaian Aaron Popoola and Bulgarian Ivan Kiriakov before losing to eventual East German champion Manfred Wolke. He competed in the Mediterranean Games twice, winning a silver medal in 1967 and a gold medal in 1971. He also won a bronze medal at the 1971 European Amateur Boxing Championships.

== 1968 Olympic results ==
Below is the record of Celal Sandal, a Turkish welterweight boxer who competed at the 1968 Mexico City Olympics:

- Round of 64: bye
- Round of 32: defeated Aaron Popoola (Ghana) by decision, 3-2
- Round of 16: defeated Ivan Kiriakov (Bulgaria) referee stopped contest
- Quarterfinal: lost to Manfred Wolke (East Germany) by decision, 1-4
