= Dorfer =

Dorfer is a surname. Notable people with the surname include:

- Alfred Dorfer (born 1961), Austrian comedian, writer and actor
- Bruno Dorfer, deserter of the German Kriegsmarine during World War II
- Franz Dorfer (1950–2012), Austrian boxer

== See also ==
- Kristina Dörfer (born 1984), German singer and television actress
- Fabian Dörfler (born 1983), German slalom canoeist
