= Vladimir Chernyshev =

Vladimir Chernyshev may refer to:

- Vladimir Chernyshyov (1951–2004), Russian volleyball player
- Vladimir Chernyshev (boxer) (born 1948), Russian boxer
