= Wilfredo Guzman =

Puerto Rican boxer

Personal information
- Nationality: Puerto Rican
- Born: 23 February 1951 (age 74)

Sport
- Sport: Boxing

Wilfredo Guzman (born 23 February 1951) is a Puerto Rican boxer. He competed in the men's light middleweight event at the 1976 Summer Olympics. At the 1976 Summer Olympics, he defeated Brian Byrne of Ireland, before losing to Jerzy Rybicki of Poland.
