= Fidelis Onye Som =

Nigerian boxer

Personal information
- Nationality: Nigerian
- Born: 5 March 1945 (age 80); Abavo Agbor, Nigeria

Sport
- Sport: Boxing

Fidelis Onye Som (born 5 March 1945) is a Nigerian boxer. He competed in the men's welterweight event at the 1968 Summer Olympics. At the 1968 Summer Olympics, he lost to Donato Paduano of Canada.
