= Franz Dorfer =

Austrian boxer

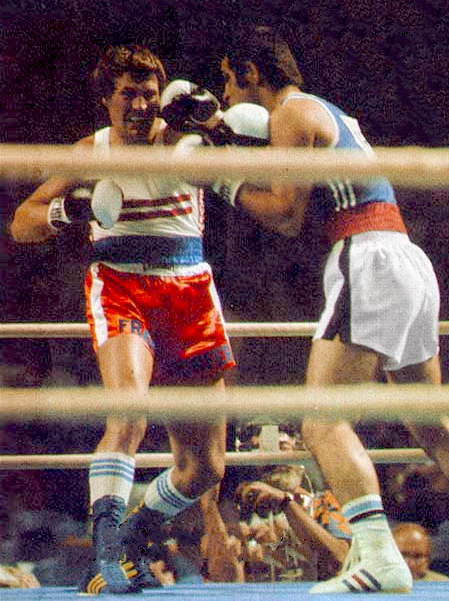
- Dorfer (left) at the 1976 Olympics

Personal information
- Nationality: Austrian
- Born: 20 May 1950 Waidhofen an der Ybbs, Austria
- Died: 8 January 2012 (aged 61) Mödling, Austria
- Height: 5 ft 8 in (173 cm)
- Weight: Light middleweight

Boxing career
- Reach: 69 in (175 cm)
- Stance: Southpaw

Boxing record
- Total fights: 36
- Wins: 23
- Win by KO: 19
- Losses: 11
- Draws: 2
Medal record
Representing Austria
European Amateur Championships
Bronze medal – third place	1975 Katowice	-71 kg

Franz Dorfer (20 May 1950 – 8 January 2012) was an Austrian professional boxer who competed in the middleweight division. As an amateur he won the bronze medal at the 1975 European Championships and competed at the 1976 Olympics, where he was eliminated in the first bout, by Iranian boxer Mohamed Azarhazin. After the Olympics he turned professional and competed in 36 bouts between 1977 and 1986, winning 23 of them.

== Early life ==
Dorfer was born to a family of farmers, and was trained as a cheesemaker in his youth. Later, in early 1970 he completed his military service in Sankt Pölten, and studied to become a gendarmerie in Mödling in 1971.

== Boxing career ==
In 1972 he became a member of the boxing club BC Schwarz Weiß in Vienna. Only one year later he won his first of four consecutive Austrian championship titles in light-middleweight. At the 1975 European championships he earned the bronze medal after he won against Kalevi Kosunen and Bulgarian Ilya Ilyev, but lost in the semi-finals against Wiesław Rudkowski, Up to 2012 this is the last medal won by any Austrian boxer at The European championships. Dorfer competed the following year at the Olympics and lost in the first round. He turned professional in 1977 and had 36 bouts (23 wins – 11 losses – 2 draws) till 1986, when he eventually retired . Two of his 19 knockout wins came against Edip Secovic (or Edip Sekowitsch) who later became WAA world champion.

== Professional boxing record ==
36 fights	23 wins	11 losses
By knockout	19	5
By decision	4	6
Draws	2	

No.	Result	Record	Opponent	Type	Round, time	Date	Location	Notes
36	Win	23–11–2	(Germany) Rüdiger Bitterling	KO	4 (?)	13 Dec 1986	Wiener Neustadt, Lower Austria, Austria	
35	Loss	22–11–2	(Germany) Graciano Rocchigiani	TKO	2 (?)	27 Apr 1984	Berlin, Berlin State, Germany	
34	Loss	22–10–2	(England) Cliff Gilpin	KO	3 (10)	15 Mar 1984	Vienna, Vienna Province, Austria	
33	Win	22–9–2	(Italy) Matteo Salvemini	PTS	8	24 Oct 1983	Vienna, Vienna Province, Austria	
32	Win	21–9–2	(Italy) Benedetto Gravina	TKO	4 (?)	6 Aug 1983	Gols, Burgenland, Austria	
31	Win	20–9–2	(Socialist Federal Republic of Yugoslavia) Momo Cupelić	KO	3 (?)	25 Jun 1983	Biberbach, Lower Austria, Austria	
30	Win	19–9–2	(Austria) Nazif Biberović	KO	8 (12)	31 Mar 1983	Vienna, Vienna Province, Austria	Retained Austrian middleweight title
29	Loss	18–9–2	(Switzerland) Moussa Kassongo Mukandjo	PTS	8	26 Dec 1982	Bern, Canton of Bern, Switzerland	
28	Loss	18–8–2	(Uganda) Dick Katende	PTS	8	13 Nov 1982	Mannheim, Baden-Württemberg, Germany	
27	Win	18–7–2	(Austria) Edip Sekowitsch	TKO	8 (12)	28 Oct 1982	Vienna, Vienna Province, Austria	Retained Austrian middleweight title
26	Loss	17–7–2	(Germany) Frank Wissenbach	PTS	8	24 Sep 1982	Festhalle, Frankfurt, Germany	
25	Win	17–6–2	(Austria) Edip Sekowitsch	TKO	2 (12), 3:00	3 Jun 1982	Mödling, Lower Austria, Austria	Won vacant Austrian middleweight title
24	Win	16–6–2	(Austria) Nazif Biberović	KO	3 (?)	24 Apr 1982	Biberbach, Lower Austria, Austria	
23	Loss	15–6–2	(Socialist Federal Republic of Yugoslavia) Marijan Beneš	TKO	4 (?)	6 Nov 1981	Vienna, Vienna Province, Austria	
22	Win	15–5–2	(Luxembourg) Sonny Kamunga	PTS	8	19 Sep 1981	Vienna, Vienna Province, Austria	
21	Win	14–5–2	(Italy) Mauro Valentino	TKO	8 (?)	10 Jul 1981	Vienna, Vienna Province, Austria	
20	Win	13–5–2	(United States) Mike McCoy	KO	2 (?)	27 Apr 1981	Vienna, Vienna Province, Austria	
19	Win	12–5–2	(Germany) Brahim Ferizović	KO	5 (?)	4 Apr 1981	Hollabrunn, Lower Austria, Austria	
18	Win	11–5–2	(Italy) Corrado Sortino	PTS	8	3 Nov 1980	Waidhofen, Lower Austria, Austria	
17	Loss	10–5–2	(Netherlands) Alex Blanchard	KO	3 (?)	1 Sep 1980	Energiehal, Rotterdam, Netherlands	
16	Loss	10–4–2	(Germany) Frank Wissenbach	PTS	8	13 Jun 1980	Lübeck, Schleswig-Holstein, Germany	
15	Win	10–3–2	(Germany) Joserf Kossmann	KO	3 (?)	30 May 1980	Vienna, Vienna Province, Austria	
14	Win	9–3–2	(Austria) Fritz Krenslehner	KO	1 (?)	13 Jul 1979	Greinsfurth, Amstetten, Austria	
13	Loss	8–3–2	(Luxembourg) Sonny Kamunga	TKO	4 (?)	17 Apr 1979	(Socialist Federal Republic of Yugoslavia) Belgrade, S.R. Serbia, Yugoslavia	
12	Loss	8–2–2	(England) Oscar Angus	PTS	8	17 Mar 1979	(Socialist Federal Republic of Yugoslavia) Banja Luka, S.R. Bosnia & Herzegovina, Yugoslavia	
11	Win	8–1–2	(France) Jacky Bauer	TKO	6 (8)	2 Dec 1978	Stadthalle, Dornbirn, Austria	
10	Loss	7–1–2	(Turkey) Agamil Yılderım	PTS	6	2 Sep 1978	Berlin, Berlin State, Germany	
9	Win	7–0–2	(Socialist Federal Republic of Yugoslavia) Branko Baraković	TKO	4 (8)	18 Aug 1978	Villach, Carinthia, Austria	
8	Win	6–0–2	(Italy) Tommaso Marocco	KO	2 (8)	22 Apr 1978	Graz, Styria, Austria	
7	Win	5–0–2	(Germany) Horst Brinkmeier	KO	1 (6)	16 Dec 1977	Vienna, Vienna Province, Austria	
6	Draw	4–0–2	(Turkey) Mehmet Besli	PTS	8	18 Nov 1977	Vienna, Vienna Province, Austria	
5	Win	4–0–1	(Italy) Antonio Rimasti	KO	2 (6)	1 Oct 1977	Vienna, Vienna Province, Austria	
4	Win	3–0–1	(Germany) Gregory Marshall	PTS	6	18 Sep 1977	Vienna, Vienna Province, Austria	
3	Win	2–0–1	(Germany) Lutz Walter	TKO	2 (?)	6 Aug 1977	Deutschlandhalle, Berlin, Germany	
2	Win	1–0–1	(Germany) Klaus Hein	KO	4 (6)	17 May 1977	Vienna, Vienna Province, Austria	
1	Draw	0–0–1	(Turkey) Mehmet Besli	PTS	4	22 Mar 1977	Vienna, Vienna Province, Austria	

== Personal life ==
Dorfer was married and fathered two daughters. He died in 2012 after battling a long illness.
