= Ivan Kiryakov =

Bulgarian boxer

Personal information
- Nationality: Bulgarian
- Born: 5 July 1943 (age 81); Nevestinovo, Bulgaria

Sport
- Sport: Boxing

Ivan Kiryakov (born 5 July 1943) is a Bulgarian boxer. He competed in the men's welterweight event at the 1968 Summer Olympics. At the 1968 Summer Olympics, he defeated Bohumil Němeček of Czechoslovakia, before losing to Celal Sandal of Turkey.
