= Peter Tiepold =

East German boxer

Personal information
- Born: 15 November 1945 (age 80)
Medal record
Men's Boxing
Representing East Germany
Olympic Games
Bronze medal – third place	1972 Munich	Light middleweight

Peter Tiepold (born 15 November 1945 in Berlin) is a former light-middleweight boxer from East Germany. He was a quarterfinalist at the 1968 Olympic Games and a bronze medallist at the 1972 Olympic Games. He competed for the SC Dynamo Berlin / Sportvereinigung (SV) Dynamo.

== 1968 Olympic results ==
Below is the record of Peter Tiepold, an East German light middleweight boxer who competed at the 1968 Mexico City Olympics:

- Round of 64: bye
- Round of 32: defeated Vladimir Kucera (Czechoslovakia) by decision, 5-0
- Round of 16: defeated Jaime Lozano (Mexico) by decision, 5-0
- Quarterfinal: lost to Jerzy Kulej (Poland) by decision, 2-3
