= Alan Jenkinson =

Australian boxer

Personal information
- Nationality: Australian
- Born: 11 February 1952
- Died: 16 November 1996 (aged 44)

Sport
- Sport: Boxing

Alan Jenkinson (11 February 1952 – 16 November 1996) was an Australian boxer. He competed in the men's light middleweight event at the 1972 Summer Olympics.
