= Max Hebeisen =

Swiss boxer

Personal information
- Nationality: Swiss
- Born: 27 June 1947 (age 79) Bern, Switzerland
- Died: 10 January 2023 (aged 75)

Sport
- Sport: Boxing

Max Hebeisen (27 June 1947 – 10 January 2023) was a Swiss boxer. He competed in the men's welterweight event at the 1968 Summer Olympics.
