= Ricky Barnor =

Ghanaian boxer

Personal information
- Nationality: Ghanaian
- Born: 23 September 1943 (age 81)

Sport
- Sport: Boxing

Ricky Barnor (born 23 September 1943) is a Ghanaian boxer. He competed in the men's light middleweight event at the 1972 Summer Olympics. At the 1972 Summer Olympics, he lost in his first fight to Rolando Garbey of Cuba.
