= Pierangelo Pira =

Italian boxer

Personal information
- Nationality: Italian
- Born: 4 January 1954 (age 71); Rimini, Italy

Sport
- Sport: Boxing

Pierangelo Pira (born 4 January 1954) is an Italian boxer. He competed in the men's light middleweight event at the 1976 Summer Olympics.
