= Joseph Bessala =

Cameroonian boxer (1941–2010)

Medal record

Men's Boxing

Representing Cameroon

Olympic Games
Silver medal – second place	1968 Mexico City	Welterweight

All-Africa Games
Gold medal – first place	1965 Brazzaville	Welterweight

Joseph Bessala (1 January 1941 – 25 April 2010) was a welterweight boxer from Cameroon.

== Amateur ==
In 1965, Bessala won the All-Africa Games in Brazzaville, Republic of the Congo. He won the African Championships twice in the welterweight class: once in 1966 in Lagos, Nigeria, (prevailing over Ghanaian, Eddie Blay in the final) and once in 1968 in Lusaka, Zambia, where he prevailed in the final fight over the Zambian, Julius Luipa, whom he beat again at the Olympic Games. He won the silver medal at the 1968 Olympic Games in Mexico City. In the final, he lost to East Germany's Manfred Wolke.

=== Amateur highlights ===
- 1965 won the All-Africa Games in Brazzaville, Congo. Beat in the final Issake Dabore (Niger) by TKO-2.
- 1966 won the African Championships in Lagos, Nigeria. Beat Eddie Blay (Ghana) in the final.
- 1968 won the African Championships in Lusaka, Zambia. Beat Julius Luipa (Zambia) in the final.

=== 1968 Olympic results ===
Below are the results of Joseph Bessala, a welterweight boxer from Cameroon, who competed at the 1968 Mexico City Olympics:

- Round of 64: bye
- Round of 32: defeated Luis Gonzales (Chile) on points, 5–0
- Round of 16: defeated Julius Luipa (Zambia) by a second-round knockout
- Quarterfinal: defeated Victor Zilberman (Romania) by a third-round technical knockout
- Semifinal: defeated Mario Guilloti (Argentina) on points, 5–0
- Final: lost to Manfred Wolke (East Germany) on points, 1-4 (was awarded silver medal)

== Professional ==
In October, Bessala started his professional career with a victory, where he defeated the Belgium's Jean-Pierre Heirmann with a first-round technical knockout. Six victories, one draw, and yet another five victories followed. In November 1974, the last victory over Eddie Blay from Ghana, who had won the bronze medal in the class of super lightweight in 1964, gained Bessala the African title in the welterweight class. The title was taken from him by Salem Ouedraogo from the Côte d'Ivoire in January 1976. After a longer break, Bessala gained back the African title from his fellow countryman, Bechir Boundka in June 1978. He aimed to defend this title again in his 16th fight, but Mimoun Mohatar from Morocco knocked him out in the 12th round in December 1978. Bessala retired from boxing shortly thereafter.
