= Michel Belliard =

French boxer (born 1949)

Personal information
- Nationality: French
- Born: 14 July 1949 (age 76)

Sport
- Sport: Boxing

Michel Belliard (born 14 July 1949) is a French boxer. He competed in the men's light middleweight event at the 1972 Summer Olympics.
