= Jerzy Rybicki =

Polish boxer (born 1953)

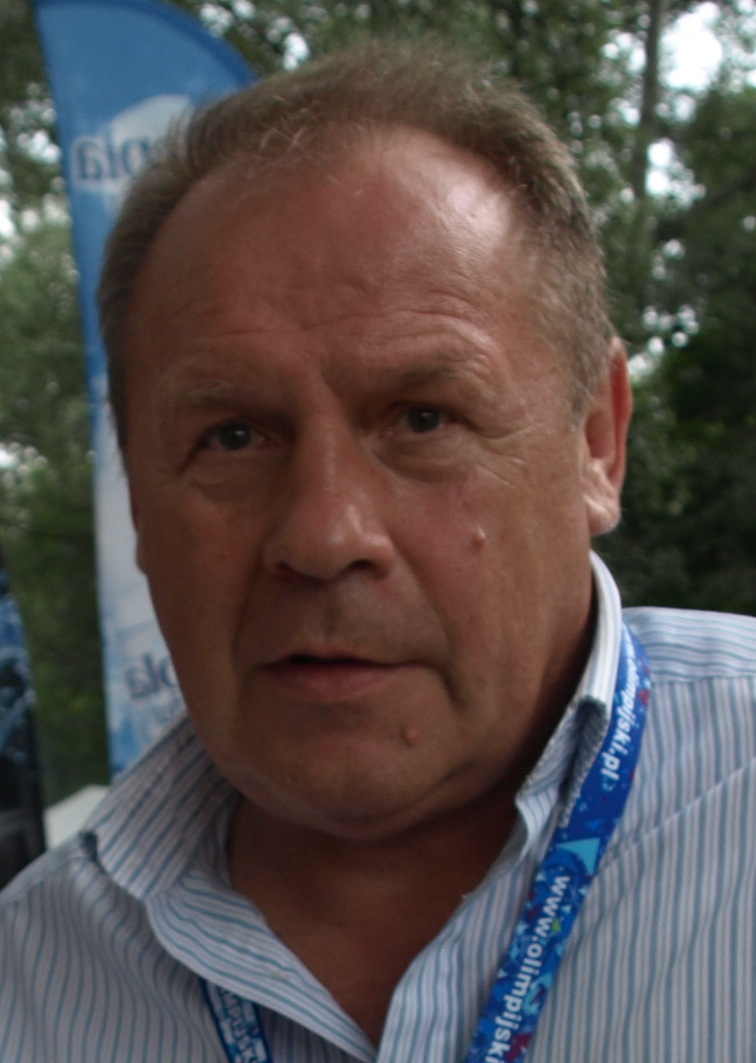

Personal information
- Born: 6 June 1953 (age 73)
Medal record
Men's boxing
Representing Poland
Olympic Games
Gold medal – first place	1976 Montréal	Light middleweight
Bronze medal – third place	1980 Moscow	Middleweight
World Amateur Championships
Bronze medal – third place	1978 Belgrade	Light middleweight
European Championships
Bronze medal – third place	1977 Halle	Light middleweight
Bronze medal – third place	1975 Katowice	Light middleweight

Jerzy Rybicki (born 6 June 1953 in Warsaw) is a retired boxer from Poland, who represented his country at the 1976 Summer Olympics in Montréal, Quebec, Canada. There he won the gold medal in the light middleweight division (– 71 kg), after having defeated Yugoslavia's Tadija Kačar in the final.

Four years later, when Moscow hosted the Games, Rybicki won the bronze medal in the middleweight category (– 75 kg). He did the same in 1978 at the second World Championships in Belgrade.

== Olympic results ==
Montreal - 1976

- Round of 32: bye
- Round of 16: Defeated Charles Walker (United States) by decision, 3–2
- Quarterfinal: Defeated Wilfredo Guzman (Puerto Rico) by decision, 5–0
- Semifinal: Defeated Viktor Savchenko (Soviet Union) by decision, 3–2
- Final: Defeated Tadija Kačar (Yugoslavia) by decision, 5–0 (won gold medal)

Moscow - 1980

- Round of 32: bye
- Round of 16: Defeated Tarmo Uusivirta (Finland) referee stopped contest in the second round
- Quarterfinal: Defeated Peter Odhiambo (Uganda) by decision, 5–0
- Semifinal: Lost to Viktor Savchenko (Soviet Union) stopped in 3rd round due to eye injury (was awarded bronze medal)
