= Juan Scassino =

Uruguayan boxer

Personal information
- Full name: Juan Pedro Scassino Ferreira
- Born: 13 July 1953 (age 72) Montevideo, Uruguay

Sport
- Sport: Boxing

Juan Scassino (born 13 July 1953) is a Uruguayan boxer. He competed in the men's light middleweight event at the 1976 Summer Olympics.
