= Ion Györffi =

Romanian boxer (born 1949)

Personal information
- Nationality: Romanian
- Born: 25 November 1949 (age 76) Bucharest, Romania

Sport
- Sport: Boxing
Medal record
Representing Romania
Romania National Amateur Boxing Championships
Gold medal – first place	1969 Bucharest	Light middleweight
Gold medal – first place	1971 Bucharest	Light middleweight
Gold medal – first place	1972 Bucharest	Light middleweight
Gold medal – first place	1973 Cluj	Light heavyweight
Gold medal – first place	1974 Bucharest	Middleweight
Gold medal – first place	1977 Bucharest	Light heavyweight
European Amateur Championships
Bronze medal – third place	1971 Madrid	Light middleweight
Bronze medal – third place	1977 Halle	Light heavyweight

Ion Györffi (born 25 November 1949) is a Romanian boxer. He competed in the men's light middleweight event at the 1972 Summer Olympics.
