= Chuck Walker (boxer) =

American boxer (born 1957)

Personal information
- Born: May 10, 1957 (age 69) Marion, Arkansas, U.S.

Sport
- Sport: Boxing
Medal record
Men's amateur boxing
Representing United States
Pan American Games
Bronze medal – third place	1975 Mexico City	Light middleweight

Chuck Walker (born May 10, 1957) is an American boxer. He competed in the men's light middleweight event at the 1976 Summer Olympics. At the 1976 Summer Olympics, he lost to Jerzy Rybicki of Poland.
