= Boxing at the 1975 Pan American Games =

The Men's Boxing Tournament at the 1975 Pan American Games was held in Mexico City, Mexico, from October 12 to October 26.

== Medal winners ==
Event	Gold	Silver	Bronze
Light Flyweight (– 48 kilograms)	Jorge Hernández; Cuba	Eleoncio Mercedes; Dominican Republic	Reinaldo Becerra; Venezuela Arturo Urruzquieta; Mexico
Flyweight (– 51 kilograms)	Ramon Duvalon; Cuba	Victor Vinuesa; Ecuador	Roberto Espinosa; El Salvador Alfredo Pérez; Venezuela
Bantamweight (– 54 kilograms)	Orlando Martínez; Cuba	Bernard Taylor; United States	Alejandro Silva; Puerto Rico Angel Pacheco; Venezuela
Featherweight (– 57 kilograms)	Davey Armstrong; United States	Genovefo Grinan; Cuba	Hugo Rengifo; Venezuela Carlos Calderón; Puerto Rico
Lightweight (– 60 kilograms)	Chris Clarke; Canada	Aaron Pryor; United States	Odalis Perez; Venezuela Luis Echaide; Cuba
Light Welterweight (– 63.5 kilograms)	Sugar Ray Leonard; United States	Victor Corona; Cuba	Jesus Navas; Venezuela Jesus Marte; Dominican Republic
Welterweight (– 67 kilograms)	Clinton Jackson; United States	Kenny Bristol; Guyana	Pedro Gamarro; Venezuela Emilio Correa; Cuba
Light Middleweight (– 71 kilograms)	Rolando Garbey; Cuba	Michael Prevost; Canada	Alfredo Lemus; Venezuela Chuck Walker; United States
Middleweight (– 75 kilograms)	Alejandro Montoya; Cuba	Fernando Martins; Brazil	Nicolas Arredondo; Mexico Ildefonso Gomez; Nicaragua
Light Heavyweight (– 81 kilograms)	Rene Pedroso; Cuba	Leon Spinks; United States	João Batista; Brazil Juan Domingo Suárez; Argentina
Heavyweight (+ 81 kilograms)	Teófilo Stevenson; Cuba	Michael Dokes; United States	Trevor Berbick; Jamaica Jair de Campos; Brazil

== Medal table ==
Rank	Nation	Gold	Silver	Bronze	Total
1	Cuba (CUB)	7	2	2	11
2	United States (USA)	3	4	1	8
3	Canada (CAN)	1	1	0	2
4	Brazil (BRA)	0	1	2	3
5	Dominican Republic (DOM)	0	1	1	2
6	Ecuador (ECU)	0	1	0	1
6	Guyana (GUY)	0	1	0	1
8	Venezuela (VEN)	0	0	8	8
9	Mexico (MEX)	0	0	2	2
9	Puerto Rico (PUR)	0	0	2	2
11	Argentina (ARG)	0	0	1	1
11	El Salvador (SLV)	0	0	1	1
11	Jamaica (JAM)	0	0	1	1
11	Nicaragua (NIC)	0	0	1	1
Totals (14 entries)		11	11	22	44
