= Mikko Saarinen =

Finnish boxer (born 1946–2022)

Personal information
- Nationality: Finnish
- Born: 4 April 1946; Salo, Finland
- Died: 29 December 2022 (aged 76)

Sport
- Sport: Boxing

Mikko Saarinen (4 April 1946 – 29 December 2022) was a Finnish boxer. He competed in the men's light middleweight event at the 1972 Summer Olympics.
