= Christy Elliott =

Irish boxer

Personal information
- Nationality: Irish
- Born: 26 May 1951
- Died: 17 April 2011 (aged 59)

Sport
- Sport: Boxing

Christy Elliott (26 May 1951 – 17 April 2011) was an Irish boxer. He competed in the men's light middleweight event at the 1972 Summer Olympics.
