= Luis González (Chilean boxer) =

Chilean boxer (born 1949)

Personal information
- Born: 9 March 1949 (age 76); Tomé, Chile

Sport
- Sport: Boxing

Luis González (born 9 March 1949) is a Chilean former boxer. He competed in the men's welterweight event at the 1968 Summer Olympics.
