= Mauri Saarivainio =

Finnish boxer

Personal information
- Nationality: Finnish
- Born: 15 November 1945 (age 79); Iisalmi, Finland

Sport
- Sport: Boxing

Mauri Saarivainio (born 15 November 1945) is a Finnish boxer. He competed in the men's welterweight event at the 1968 Summer Olympics. At the 1968 Summer Olympics, he lost to Dieter Kottysch of West Germany.
