= Reggie Jones (boxer) =

American boxer (born 1951)

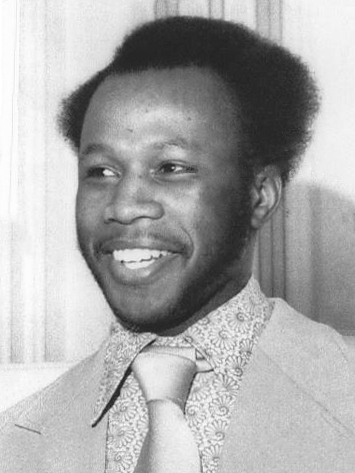
- Jones in 1972

Personal information
- Born: 1951 (age 74–75) Newark, New Jersey, U.S.
- Height: 174 cm (5 ft 9 in)
- Weight: Middleweight

Boxing career

Boxing record
- Total fights: 26
- Wins: 16
- Win by KO: 8
- Losses: 9
- Draws: 1
Medal record
Representing United States
Pan American Games
Bronze medal – third place	Cali 1971	-71 kg

Reginald Dennis Jones (born 1951) is a retired boxer from the United States, who represented his native country at the 1972 Summer Olympics. There he was controversially eliminated in the second round of the light middleweight division (– 71 kg) by Valeri Tregubov of the Soviet Union in a fight he was generally accepted to have won.

Born in Savannah, Georgia, Jones moved to Newark as a child, attending the public schools and graduating from Weequahic High School in 1969, where he played basketball and football, as well as running on the school's track team.

Jones took up boxing at Guantanamo Bay in Cuba while serving in the U.S. Navy. He won a bronze medal at the 1971 Pan American Games, two Marines and Interservice titles, and two North Carolina AAU titles. He turned professional after the 1972 Olympics, and became the New Jersey State Middleweight Champion when he beat Bobby Patterson over 12 rounds. He would hold that title for the next two years, before he lost to fellow 2010 Inductee Rusty Rosenberger. After retiring from boxing he settled in Summit, New Jersey, to become a social worker with the Essex County Division of Welfare and then for 31 years with the New Jersey Division of Youth & Family Services, until his retirement in February 2016.

== 1972 Olympic results ==
Below is the record of Reggie Jones, an American light middleweight boxer who competed at the 1972 Munich Olympics:

- Round of 32: lost to Valeri Tregubov (Soviet Union) by decision, 2–3

== Professional boxing record ==
16 Wins (8 knockouts, 8 decisions), 10 Losses (3 knockouts, 7 decisions), 1 Draw
Result	Record	Opponent	Type	Round	Date	Location	Notes
Loss	0-2	(United States) John Elmore	PTS	6	21/02/1986	East Orange, New Jersey, United States	
Loss	17-19-2	(United States) Bob "Hunter" Patterson	PTS	6	23/04/1982	East Orange, New Jersey, United States	
Loss	12-0	(United States) Bobby Czyz	TKO	7	18/06/1981	Totowa, New Jersey, United States	New Jersey Middleweight Title.
Win	0-1	(United States) Greg Thomas	KO	2	18/12/1980	Totowa, New Jersey, United States	
Loss	26-1-2	(Syria) Mustafa Hamsho	TKO	6	29/03/1980	Atlantic City, New Jersey, United States	
Win	4-16-5	(United States) Tyrone Freeman	KO	3	29/06/1979	Jersey City, New Jersey, United States	
Loss	12-0	(United States) Rusty Rosenberger	MD	12	27/04/1979	Newark, New Jersey, United States	New Jersey Middleweight Title.
Win	7-0	(United States) Ray Kates	SD	12	10/03/1979	Woodbridge, New Jersey, United States	
Win	2-1	(United States) Charles "Hari" Carey	PTS	8	09/09/1978	Woodbridge, New Jersey, United States	
Loss	3-6	(United States) Ray "Baby" Smith	PTS	8	16/08/1978	Newark, New Jersey, United States	
Win	0-18	(Canada) Roland Cousins	KO	3	30/06/1978	Newark, New Jersey, United States	
Win	1-3	(United States) John "Godfather" Martino	PTS	10	30/11/1977	Newark, New Jersey, United States	
Win	0-16	(Canada) Roland Cousins	KO	3	07/11/1977	Durham, North Carolina, United States	
Win	10-1-2	(United States) Bob "Hunter" Patterson	PTS	12	23/06/1977	Newark, New Jersey, United States	
Win	20-20-2	(Trinidad and Tobago) Matt "Art" Donovan	KO	5	26/05/1977	McAfee, New Jersey, United States	
Win	8-4-2	(Cuba) Ali Perez	PTS	10	25/04/1977	Newark, New Jersey, United States	
Draw	5-1-1	(Syria) Mustafa Hamsho	PTS	8	16/08/1976	Newark, New Jersey, United States	
Win	12-13-2	(United States) Alfonso Aguirre	UD	10	26/07/1976	New Orleans, Louisiana, United States	
Win	--	Butch Bostich	KO	1	25/05/1976	Alexandria, Louisiana, United States	
Win	3-0	(United States) Charles "Akbar Ali" Buckner	SD	6	04/04/1976	New Orleans, Louisiana, United States	
Loss	5-0	(United States) John "The Poll" Harris	UD	6	31/01/1976	Waterbury, Connecticut, United States	
Loss	2-2	(Cuba) Ali Perez	PTS	6	26/09/1975	(New York (state)) Latham, New York, United States	
Win	2-1	(Cuba) Ali Perez	PTS	6	05/08/1975	Elizabeth, New Jersey, United States	
Loss	6-0	(United States) Bob "Paycheck" Payton	PTS	6	20/02/1975	Upper Darby Township, Pennsylvania, United States	
Loss	8-1-1	(United States) Chris "Back in" Black	TKO	1	28/10/1974	(New York (state)) New York City, United States	
Win	2-5-2	(United States) Walter Riley	KO	1	20/06/1974	North Bergen, New Jersey, United States	
Win	--	Carlos Stevens	KO	4	17/01/1974	North Bergen, New Jersey, United States	
