= Emeterio Villanueva =

Mexican boxer (born 1946)

Emeterio Villanueva Barrios
Personal information
- Nationality: Mexican
- Born: 3 March 1946 (age 80)

Sport
- Sport: Boxing
Medal record
Men's amateur boxing
Representing Mexico
Pan American Games
Silver medal – second place	1971 Cali	Light middleweight

Emeterio Villanueva (born 3 March 1946) is a Mexican boxer. He competed in the men's light middleweight event at the 1972 Summer Olympics.
