= John Opio =

Ugandan boxer

Personal information
- Nationality: Ugandan
- Born: 28 October 1951 (age 73)

Sport
- Sport: Boxing

John Opio (born 28 October 1951) is a Ugandan boxer. He competed in the men's light middleweight event at the 1972 Summer Olympics.
