= Antonio Castellini =

Italian boxer (1951–1976)

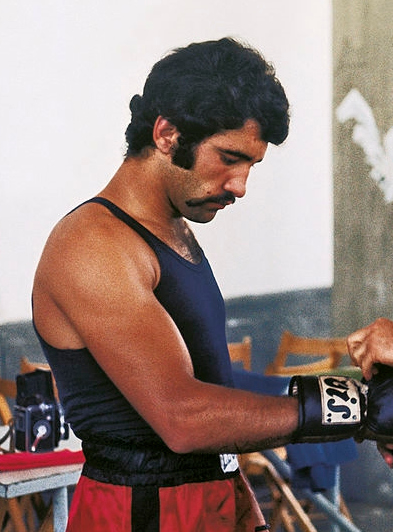
- Antonio Castellini in at the 1972 Olympics

Personal information
- Nicknames: Nino, Miguel
- Nationality: Italy
- Born: 14 April 1951 Palermo, Italy
- Died: 26 August 1976 (aged 25) Palermo, Italy
- Height: 1.72 m (5 ft 8 in)

Boxing career

Boxing record
- Total fights: 32
- Wins: 28
- Win by KO: 14
- Losses: 4
- Draws: 0
Medal record
Representing Italy
Mediterranean Games
Bronze medal – third place	1971 Izimir	-71 kg

Antonio "Nino" Castellini (14 April 1951 – 26 August 1976) was an Italian boxer who won a bronze medal at the 1971 Mediterranean Games in the light-middleweight category. Next year he competed at the Munich Olympics, but was eliminated in the first round by the eventual silver medalist Wiesław Rudkowski. After the Olympics he turned professional, and won a national super welterweight title in 1974–1976. He died in a motorcycle incident, aged 25.
