= Issoufou Habou =

Nigerien boxer (born 1945)

Issoufou Habou (born 1945) is a former Nigerien light-middleweight boxer. Habou competed at the 1972 Summer Olympics for Niger. He lost his only match to Mohamed Majeri of Tunisia.
