= Mohamed Bouchara =

Moroccan boxer

Personal information
- Nationality: Moroccan
- Born: 1944 (age 80–81); Casablanca, Morocco

Sport
- Sport: Boxing

Mohamed Bouchara (born 1944) is a Moroccan boxer. He competed in the men's welterweight event at the 1968 Summer Olympics.
