= Yvon Mariolle =

French boxer

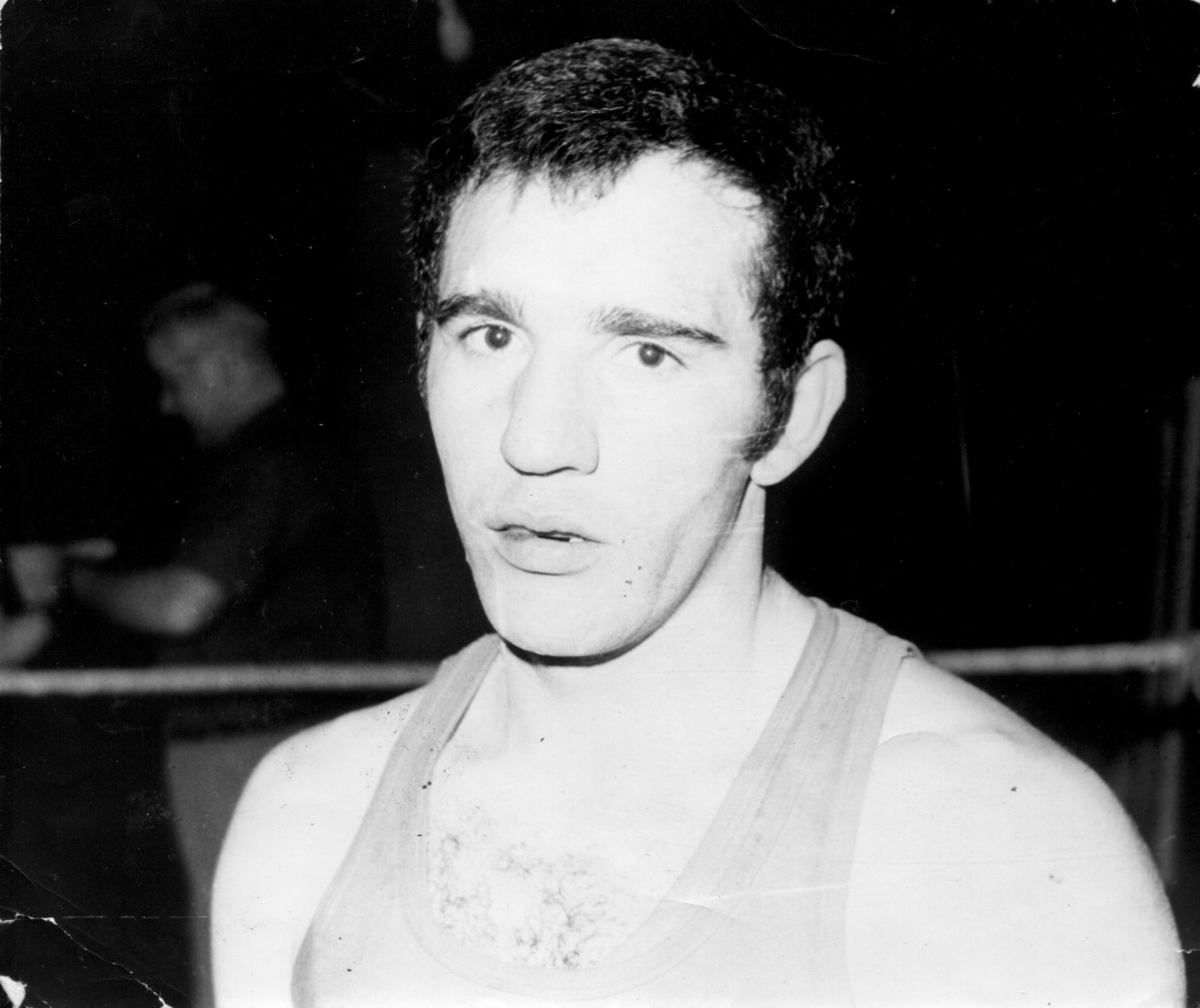

Personal information
- Nationality: French
- Born: 29 April 1946; Orléans, France
- Died: 8 November 1999 (aged 53)

Sport
- Sport: Boxing

Yvon Mariolle (29 April 1946 – 8 November 1999) was a French boxer. He became French national welterweight champion in 1965, and retained his title in 1968. He competed in the men's welterweight event at the 1968 Summer Olympics.

In December 1972 he was found guilty of "theft, possession of stolen goods and association with wrongdoers" ("vol, recel et association de malfaiteurs") and sent to prison. Later in life, he worked as a painter. He had a twin brother, Marcel, who was also a boxer.
