= Lim Jae-keun =

Korean boxer

Personal information
- Nationality: South Korean
- Born: 17 July 1950 (age 74)

Sport
- Sport: Boxing

Lim Jae-keun (born 17 July 1950) is a South Korean boxer. He competed in the men's light middleweight event at the 1972 Summer Olympics.
