= 1971 European Amateur Boxing Championships =

Boxing competitions

- Host city: Madrid
- Country: Spain
- Nations: 27
- Athletes: 194
- Dates: 11–19 June

The 1971 European Amateur Boxing Championships were held in Madrid, Spain from 11 June to 19 June. The 19th edition of the bi-annual competition was organised by the European governing body for amateur boxing, EABA. There were 194 fighters from 27 countries participating.

== Medal winners ==
Event	Gold	Silver	Bronze
Light Flyweight (– 48 kilograms)	György Gedó; Hungary	Aurel Mihai; Romania	Roman Rożek; Poland José Escudero; Spain
Flyweight (– 51 kilograms)	Juan Francisco Rodríguez; Spain	Leszek Błażyński; Poland	(Republic of Ireland) Neil McLaughlin; Ireland Constantin Gruiescu; Romania
Bantamweight (– 54 kilograms)	Tibor Badari; Hungary	Aleksandr Melnikov; Soviet Union	Aurel Dumitrescu; Romania (Republic of Ireland) Michael Dowling; Ireland
Featherweight (– 57 kilograms)	Ryszard Tomczyk; Poland	András Botos; Hungary	Gabriel Pometcu; Romania (Republic of Ireland) Brendan McCarthy; Ireland
Lightweight (– 60 kilograms)	Jan Szczepański; Poland	Antoniu Vasile; Romania	László Orbán; Hungary Nikolay Chromov; Soviet Union
Light Welterweight (– 63.5 kilograms)	Ulrich Beyer; East Germany	Calistrat Cuțov; Romania	Michael Kingwell; England Erik Sivebæk; Denmark
Welterweight (– 67 kilograms)	János Kajdi; Hungary	Manfred Wolke; East Germany	Celal Sandal; Turkey Damiano Lassandro; Italy
Light Middleweight (– 71 kilograms)	Valeriy Tregubov; Soviet Union	(Socialist Federal Republic of Yugoslavia) Svetomir Belić; Yugoslavia	Wiesław Rudkowski; Poland Ion Györffi; Romania
Middleweight (– 75 kilograms)	Juozas Juocevičius; Soviet Union	Alec Năstac; Romania	Hans-Joachim Brauske; East Germany Reima Virtanen; Finland
Light Heavyweight (– 81 kilograms)	(Socialist Federal Republic of Yugoslavia) Mate Parlov; Yugoslavia	Ottomar Sachse; East Germany	Ralf Jensen; Denmark Horst Stump; Romania
Heavyweight (+ 81 kilograms)	Vladimir Chernyshev; Soviet Union	Peter Hussing; West Germany	Ludwik Denderys; Poland Les Stevens; England

== Medal table ==
* Host nation (Spain)

Rank	Nation	Gold	Silver	Bronze	Total
1	Hungary (HUN)	3	1	1	5
1	Soviet Union (URS)	3	1	1	5
3	Poland (POL)	2	1	3	6
4	East Germany (GDR)	1	2	1	4
5	Yugoslavia (SFR Yugoslavia)	1	1	0	2
6	Spain (ESP)*	1	0	1	2
7	Romania (ROU)	0	4	5	9
8	West Germany (FRG)	0	1	0	1
9	Ireland (IRL)	0	0	3	3
10	Denmark (DEN)	0	0	2	2
10	England (ENG)	0	0	2	2
12	Finland (FIN)	0	0	1	1
12	Italy (ITA)	0	0	1	1
12	Turkey (TUR)	0	0	1	1
Totals (14 entries)		11	11	22	44
