= Vladimir Chernyshev (boxer) =

Russian boxer

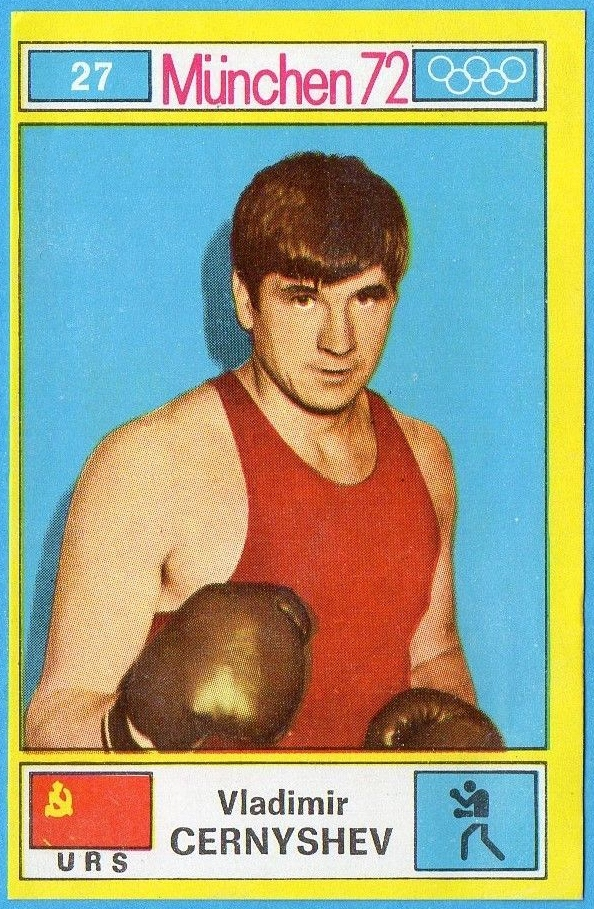

Personal information
- Born: 5 November 1948 (age 77) Orenburg, Russian SFSR, Soviet Union

Sport
- Sport: Boxing
- Club: Trudovye reservy
Medal record
Representing the Soviet Union
European Amateur Boxing Championships
Gold medal – first place	1971 Madrid	+81 kg

Vladimir Fyodorovich Chernyshov (Russian: Владимир Фёдорович Чернышёв, born 5 November 1948) is a retired Russian heavyweight boxer who won the European championships in 1971. In 1972 he was about to retire and got injured at the national championships; he was therefore not selected for the 1972 Olympics.
