= István Gáli =

Hungarian boxer (1943–2020)

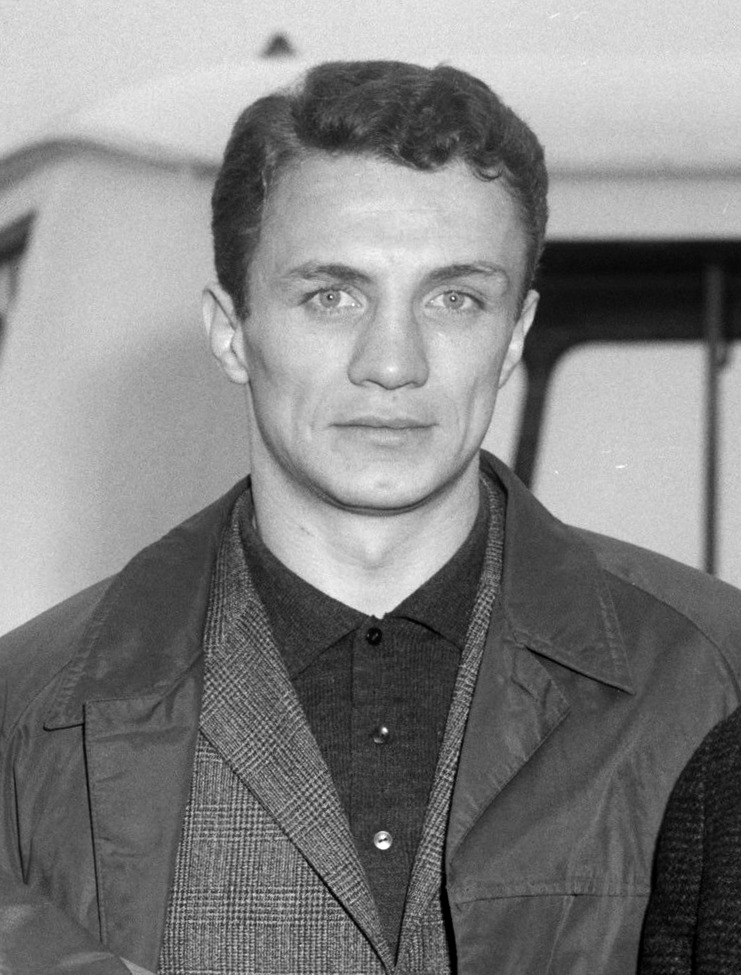
- István Gáli in 1966

Personal information
- Born: 5 July 1943 Bodroghalom, Hungary
- Died: 20 February 2020 (aged 76) Budapest
- Height: 1.80 m (5 ft 11 in)

Sport
- Sport: Boxing
- Weight class: Welterweight
- Club: Budapesti Honvéd Sportegyesület
Medal record
Representing Hungary
European Championships
Bronze medal – third place	1967 Rome	-67 kg

István Gáli (Gaáli) (5 July 1943 – 20 February 2020) was a welterweight boxer from Hungary who won a bronze medal at the 1967 European Championships. Next year he competed at the 1968 Olympics, but was eliminated in the third bout.
