= Brian Byrne (boxer) =

Irish boxer

Personal information
- Nationality: Irish
- Born: 11 June 1956 (age 68)

Sport
- Sport: Boxing

Brian Byrne (born 11 June 1956) is an Irish boxer. He competed in the men's light middleweight event at the 1976 Summer Olympics.
