= Svetomir Belić =

Serbian boxer (1946–2002)

Personal information
- Nicknames: Belka, Sveta
- Nationality: Serbian
- Born: Svetomir Beljić; 12 October 1946 Smederevo, FPR Yugoslavia
- Died: 28 July 2002 (aged 55) Belgrade, FR Yugoslavia
- Height: 1.79 m (5 ft 10 in)
- Weight: Light middleweight

Boxing career
- Stance: Orthodox
Medal record
Men's Boxing
Representing Yugoslavia
European Amateur Championships
Silver medal – second place	1971 Madrid	Light Middleweight
Mediterranean Games
Bronze medal – third place	1975 Algiers	Light Middleweight

Svetomir Belić (Serbian Cyrillic: Светомир Белић; 12 October 1946 – 28 July 2002) was a Serbian former boxer. After retiring at the age of 33 in 1980, he became a boxing coach.

He has been called a "legend of Serbian boxing".

== Career ==
In 1971, as a member of the boxing section of the Partizan Sports Society, he won the silver medal at the European Amateur Boxing Championships.

He represented Yugoslavia at the 1972 Summer Olympics, where he was defeated by Anthony Richardson of the Netherlands in a second round bout in the light-middleweight division.

=== 1972 Olympic record ===
Record of Svetomir Belić at the 1972 Munich Olympics:

- Round of 64: defeated Dumar Fall (Senegal) by decision, 4-1
- Round of 32: lost to Anthony Richardson (Netherlands) by decision, 2-3

== Death ==
Belić died on 28 July 2002.
