= Reggie Ford (boxer) =

Guyanese boxer (1953–2021)

Personal information
- Nationality: Guyanese
- Born: 11 June 1953 Georgetown, British Guiana
- Died: 2 February 2021 (aged 67)

Sport
- Sport: Boxing
Medal record
Men's amateur boxing
Representing Guyana
Pan American Games
Bronze medal – third place	1971 Cali	Light-welterweight
Central American and Caribbean Games
Bronze medal – third place	1974 Santo Domingo	Light-welterweight

Reggie Ford (11 June 1953 – 2 February 2021) was a Guyanese boxer. He competed in the men's light middleweight event at the 1972 Summer Olympics. As a light-welterweight, Ford won bronze medals at the 1971 Pan American Games and at the 1974 Central American and Caribbean Games.
