= Valery Tregubov =

Soviet boxer (1942–1974)

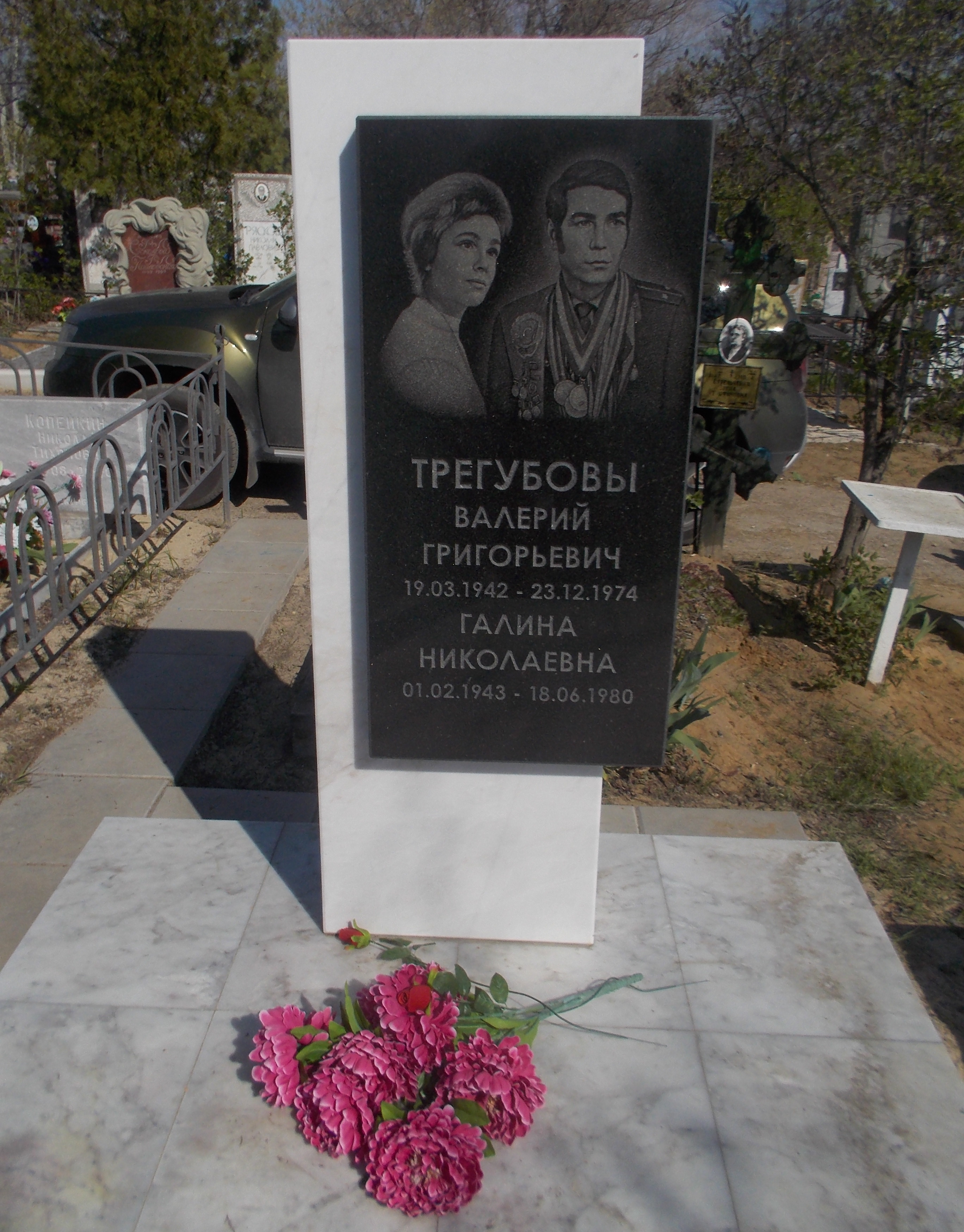
- V. G. Tregubov's grave at the Dzerzhinsky cemetery in Volgograd.

Personal information
- Nationality: Soviet Union
- Born: 19 March 1942 Stalingrad, Russian SFSR, Soviet Union
- Died: 23 December 1974 (aged 32)

Sport
- Sport: Boxing
Medal record
Men's amateur boxing
Representing Soviet Union
European Championships
Gold medal – first place	1969 Bucharest	Light middleweight
Gold medal – first place	1971 Belgrade	Light middleweight

Valery Tregubov (19 March 1942 – 23 December 1974) was a Soviet boxer. He competed in the men's light middleweight event at the 1972 Summer Olympics.
