= Donato Paduano =

Canadian boxer (1948–2024)

Personal information
- Nationality: Canadian
- Born: 28 November 1948 Campobasso, Italy
- Died: 19 November 2024 (aged 75) Montreal, Canada
- Height: 167 cm (5 ft 6 in)
- Weight: 71 kg (157 lb)

Sport
- Sport: Boxing
- Weight class: Welterweight (-67 kg); Light middleweight (-71 kg)
Medal record
Men's boxing
Representing Canada
Pan American Games
Bronze medal – third place	1967 Winnipeg	Light middleweight

Donato Paduano (28 November 1948 – 19 November 2024) was a Canadian boxer. He competed in the men's welterweight event at the 1968 Summer Olympics.

Paduano died of complications from diabetes in Montreal, on 19 November 2024, at the age of 75.
