= Wayne Devlin =

Australian boxer (1944–2025)

Personal information
- Nationality: Australian
- Born: 17 July 1944
- Died: 21 November 2025 (aged 81) Launceston, Tasmania

Sport
- Sport: Boxing

Wayne Devlin (17 July 1944 – 21 November 2025) was an Australian boxer. He competed at the 1972 Summer Olympics and the 1976 Summer Olympics. At the 1976 Summer Olympics, he lost in his opening fight to Robbie Davies of Great Britain. He died on 21 November 2025, aged 81.
