= Julius Luipa =

Zambian boxer (1948–1996)

Personal information
- Nickname: Juju Man
- Nationality: Zambian
- Born: January 2, 1948 Chingola, Northern Rhodesia
- Died: 19 June 1996 (aged 48) Chingola, Zambia
- Height: 1.80 m (5 ft 11 in)
- Weight: Welterweight; Light Middleweight; Middleweight; Light Heavyweight

Boxing career
- Stance: Orthodox

Julius Luipa
Medal record

Representing Zambia

Men's Boxing

British Commonwealth Games
Silver medal – second place	1970 Edinburgh	Light Middleweight
Silver medal – second place	1974 Christchurch	Middleweight

Julius Luipa (2 January 1948 – 19 June 1996) was a Zambian boxer who won two silver medals at the Commonwealth Games and represented Zambia at the 1968 and 1972 Olympic Games. One of Zambia's best amateur boxers, he was the country's Sportsman of the Year in 1970 and when he turned professional four years later, he defeated George Chisenga to become Zambian light heavyweight champion and held the title until he was dethroned by Lottie Mwale in 1977.

== Career ==
Luipa was born in Chingola where he took up boxing at the age of ten at Nchanga North Boxing Club. He started his amateur boxing career at Chingola Police Amateur Boxing Club in 1962, and by 1967, was considered one of Zambia's best amateur boxers.

He won a silver medal during the fourth All-Africa amateur boxing championships held in Lusaka in 1968, losing the welterweight final to Cameroon’s Joseph Bessala. He was selected to represent his country at the 1968 Mexico Summer Olympics where he defeated Algeria’s Rabah Labiod in the opening round, and then received a bye in round two. As fate would have it, he faced Bessala once again and was defeated, ranking ninth overall, as Bessala went on to win the silver medal.

Luipa switched to the light middleweight division for the 1970 Commonwealth Games in Edinburgh, and took home a silver medal, after losing to Scotsman Tom Imrie in the final, and this helped him win the Zambian Sportsman of the Year award for 1970.

Highly respected in Zambian boxing circles, Luipa served as trainer and captain of the Zambia national amateur boxing team from 1968 to 1973. In November 1970, he was sponsored to a 41-day boxing training session in Lagos, Nigeria by the Supreme Council for Sport in Africa in conjunction with the Amateur Boxing Association of Zambia, and he pledged to turn a lot of young hopefuls into good boxers if given the opportunity to train them. "I see hundreds and hundreds of young boxers who not only come to watch but also participate in training sessions at various centres all over the country," he said. "They are enthusiastic about it and take a keen interest in learning from those already in the field."

In 1971, he was again sponsored by the Supreme Council for Sport in Africa to attend a trainers’ course in West Germany for six months and the following year, he won a silver medal at a tournament in Minsk, Byelorussian SSR and was the only Zambian to take part in the East and Central African Championship in Uganda. He won a gold medal and described the championships as ‘tough but enjoyable.’

Luipa was once again selected to represent Zambia at the 1972 Olympics in Munich, this time as a middleweight. At this tournament, he was eliminated by Bill Knight of Great Britain on points in the opening round. This turned out to be one of the biggest disappointments of his career.

In 1973, Luipa formed Chiwempala Amateur Boxing Club when he became an assistant welfare officer and was the club's first trainer. In the same year, he fought another future Zambian champion Lottie Mwale at Nchanga Social club. Although he dropped Mwale to one knee in the first round, the younger fighter came out stronger in the second round and went on to win a split points decision. Both Luipa and Mwale represented Zambia at the 1974 Commonwealth Games in Christchurch, New Zealand, where Mwale won a gold medal in the light middleweight division while Luipa had to settle for silver, after being knocked out in the final of the middleweight competition by Frankie Lucas of Saint Vincent and the Grenadines.

Nicknamed Juju Man, not, because of a connection to black magic as the name implies, but the iteration of the first syllable of his first name, Luipa turned professional soon after the Commonwealth Games as a middleweight under Pius Kakungu Stables. His first fight was a 10-round bout against Jim Corbett whom he knocked out in the third round. Due to a lack of opponents in the division, Luipa was forced to move up to light heavyweight and later that year, he challenged title holder George Chisenga whom he defeated via a sixth-round knockout to become Zambian light heavyweight champion.

He set his eyes on the Commonwealth title and registered victories over Lovemore Gatsi and David Natta in 1975. He also beat King Marshall Jetu of Malawi and defended his title against Fanwell Mwanza in 1976. However, his reign was ended by a loss to Zambian boxing's golden boy Lottie Mwale who knocked him out in the 6th round of their title fight on 27 August 1977, which was his first loss as a professional. Luipa blamed an injury to his wrist and a pulled muscle in his left arm for the defeat, and promised to win back his title after treatment. Luipa later admitted that he was no longer the same after this fight as he subsequently sank into depression, which was made worse by his friends back in Chingola mocking him over the loss.

A rematch with Mwale never materialized though Luipa fought another rising star in Chisanda Mutti in 1978, but was knocked out, and he quit boxing the following year.

== 1968 Olympic results ==
Below is the record of Julius Lupia, a Zambian welterweight boxer who competed at the 1968 Mexico City Olympics:

- Round of 64: defeated Rabah Laboid (Algeria) by decision, 4-1
- Round of 32: bye
- Round of 16: lost to Joseph Bessala (Cameroon) referee stopped contest

== 1972 Olympic results ==
Below is the record of Julius Lupia, a Zambian middleweight boxer who competed at the 1972 Munich Olympics:

- Round of 32: lost to William Knight (Great Britain) by decision, 2-3

== Life after boxing ==
By 1982, Luipa was completely impoverished and the newspapers brought his sad circumstances to light. Since leaving his last job with the Chingola District Council as an assistant community development officer, Luipa had fallen on hard times. With nowhere to stay, he was being kept by his brother in Ndola's Mushili township and had been forced to surrender his wife to her parents because he could no longer afford to take care of her.

He was suffering from a bad case of stomach cramps which forced him to do away with proper meals and subsist on bread, buns and water. “Each time I take cooked food I suffer from indigestion so my proper diet now is dry buns and water,” he disclosed to the Zambia Daily Mail. What kept him going was his Christian faith and he never missed prayers, spending most of his mornings and evenings at the Mushili Roman Catholic Church. “I’m a sick man and my career has suffered. There is no hope except to pray hard so that the Almighty could lessen my sufferings.”

Boxing trainer Ellis Bwalya appealed to the Ministry of Youth & Sport to help the neglected former champion while promoter Pius Kakungu bought him some clothes and appealed to well-wishers to do the same. “He is lonely. His friends have deserted him because he is always in tatters,” said Kakungu.

Exhibition bouts whose proceeds would be given to him were mooted and a charity drive improved his circumstances somewhat as he eventually moved back into his own house in Chingola where he faded into obscurity.

== Death ==
After being ill for some time Luipa died at home on 19 June 1996, with barely a mention of his passing in the local media. The Times of Zambia however still described him as a destitute and this was echoed by the man who dethroned him, Lottie Mwale, who described him as a brother. “It is sad he is gone. He died a poor man, rather forgotten despite his contribution to Zambian boxing. He was like a brother to me and I learnt a lot from him.”

He was laid to rest at Chiwempala Cemetery on 21 June 1996.

== Legacy ==
According to the Times of Zambia: "Luipa inspired a lot of upcoming boxers and was always ready to share his knowledge and experience with younger fighters like Mwale, who drew on Luipa's experience at the 1974 Commonwealth Games."

He also trained a lot of young boxers in welfare centres and boxing clubs and was the first trainer at Chiwempala Amateur Boxing club which he formed in 1973.

== Honours ==
=== Amateur highlights ===
- 1968 Africa Amateur Boxing Championships: Silver medal
- 1970 Commonwealth Games: Silver medal
- 1971 Minsk Championship: Silver medal
- 1971 East and Central African Boxing Championship: Gold medal
- 1974 Commonwealth Games: Silver medal

=== Professional ===
1974-1977: Zambian light heavy weight title

=== Individual ===
Zambian Sportsman of the Year 1970
