= Bonifacio Ávila =

Colombian boxer (1950–2026)

Bonifacio Ávila (June 5, 1950 – January 5, 2026) was a Colombian boxer, who represented his native country at the 1972 Summer Olympics. There he was eliminated in the second round of the men's light middleweight division (– 71 kg) by eventual gold medalist Dieter Kottysch from West Germany. Ávila turned pro on April 6, 1973, and retired in 1979 after 28 bouts (17 wins, 8 losses, and 3 draws).

Bonifacio Ávila died on January 5, 2026, at the age of 75.

== Olympic results ==
- 1st round bye
- Lost to Dieter Kottysch (West Germany) TKO by 2

== Professional boxing record ==
17 Wins (14 knockouts, 3 decisions), 9 Losses (7 knockouts, 2 decisions), 3 Draws
Result	Record	Opponent	Type	Round	Date	Location	Notes
Loss	35-7-1	(Canada) Jean-Claude LeClair	KO	4	21/08/1979	Montreal, Quebec, Canada	Ávila knocked out at 2:51 of the fourth round.
Loss	14-0	(Canada) Eddie Melo	TKO	6	25/05/1979	Montreal, Quebec, Canada	Referee stopped the bout at 2:36 of the sixth round.
Loss	23-2	(Puerto Rico) Carlos De León	TKO	2	27/01/1979	San Juan, Puerto Rico, U.S.	
Loss	26-2-3	(Argentina) Alfredo Horacio Cabral	PTS	10	11/11/1978	Buenos Aires, Argentina	
Loss	42-7-1	(South Africa) Elijah Makathini	PTS	10	10/10/1978	Durban, South Africa	
Win	13-5	(United States) Roy "Smoky" Edmonds	KO	6	06/06/1978	Montreal, Quebec, Canada	Edmonds knocked out at 2:37 of the sixth round.
Loss	11-3-2	(United States) Bob "Hunter" Patterson	TKO	10	21/02/1978	Montreal, Quebec, Canada	Referee stopped the bout at 1:12 of the tenth round.
Loss	14-0	(Uganda) Ayub Kalule	TKO	4	05/01/1978	Randers, Denmark	
Win	32-28-1	(Trinidad and Tobago) Carlos Marks	PTS	12	24/07/1977	Cartagena, Colombia	
Win	5-17-3	(United States) Don Melosh	KO	3	09/05/1977	Quebec City, Canada	
Loss	14-6	(United States) Lenny Harden	TKO	6	22/03/1977	Montreal, Quebec, Canada	
Win	14-6-1	(United States) JT Dowe	KO	4	22/02/1977	Montreal, Quebec, Canada	Dowe knocked out at 1:59 of the fourth round.
Win	27-37-5	(Canada) Gary Broughton	TKO	8	09/02/1977	Quebec City, Canada	
Win	2-4	(Colombia) Juan Evangelista Córdoba	KO	?	12/12/1976	Santa María, Colombia	
Win	7-0-1	(United States) John "The Poll" Harris	KO	1	06/08/1976	(United States) New York City, U.S.	
Win	9-27-2	(United States) Curtis Phillips	KO	5	26/07/1976	(United States) New York City, U.S.	
Draw	1-3-1	(Colombia) Alirio Quiñónez	PTS	10	08/10/1975	Santa María, Colombia	
Win	12-0	(Puerto Rico) Nelson LaSalle	TKO	6	16/08/1975	Cartagena, Colombia	
Draw	1-3	(Colombia) Alirio Quiñónez	PTS	10	23/05/1975	Medellín, Colombia	
Win	2-3	(Colombia) Juan Evangelista Córdoba	KO	7	12/12/1974	Cartagena, Colombia	
Win	1-2	(Colombia) Alirio Quiñónez	PTS	10	06/09/1974	Bogotá, Colombia	
Loss	3-1	(Colombia) Angel Rodríguez	KO	6	20/06/1974	Barranquilla, Colombia	
Win	18-11-6	(United States) Don Lutz	KO	1	16/03/1974	Cartagena, Colombia	
Draw	0-1	Felipe Cariaco	TD	3	02/03/1974	Cartagena, Colombia	
Win	3-0	(Colombia) "Arc" Angel Rodríguez	KO	5	14/12/1973	Bogotá, Colombia	
Win	2-2	(Colombia) Juan Evangelista Córdoba	TKO	6	14/08/1973	Cartagena, Colombia	
Win	0-1	Gregorio Arboleda	PTS	8	30/05/1973	Bogotá, Colombia	
Win	--	(Nicaragua) Jorge de Ávila	KO	5	11/05/1973	Cartagena, Colombia	
Win	--	(Colombia) Eduardo Hurtado	KO	1	06/04/1973	Cartagena, Colombia	
