= Michael Prevost =

German born Canadian boxer

Medal record

Men's Boxing

Pan American Games
Silver medal – second place	Mexico City 1975	Light Middleweight

Michael Prevost (born June 5, 1953 on a Canadian military base in Hameln, Germany) is a retired amateur boxer who represented Canada at the 1976 Summer Olympics. There he was disqualified (for holding while looking at the clock to determine how much time remained) in his first fight against Vasile Didea of Romania by an Australian referee. On being disqualified, he stomped around the ring for several minutes and would not leave. The referee was also later disqualified when he was found with a suspicious amount of money that was not in his possession when entering Canada. Prevost won the silver medal at the 1975 Pan American Games.

== 1976 Olympic results ==
Below is the Olympic record of Michael Prevost, a Canadian light middleweight boxer who competed at the 1976 Montreal Olympics:

- Round of 32: lost to Vasile Didea (Romania) on a third-round disqualification

He was also Canadian champion seven times and had been boxing since the age of five. Although the Canadian Boxing Association asked him to represent Canada in the following commonwealth games, he declined on the grounds that he had not been fully supported in rectifying the situation during the 1976 Olympics.
