= Tadesse Gebregiorgis =

Ethiopian boxer (born 1938)

Personal information
- Nationality: Ethiopian
- Born: 29 March 1938 (age 88) Addis Ababa, Ethiopia
- Height: 174 cm (5 ft 9 in)
- Weight: 66 kg (146 lb)

Sport
- Sport: Boxing

Tadesse Gebregiorgis (born 29 March 1938) is an Ethiopian former boxer.

Gebregiorgis is regarded a boxing pioneeer, making the boxing debut for Ethiopia at the Summer Olympis at the 1968 Summer Olympics in Mexico City. He later also competed at the 1968 Summer Olympics. At the 1968 Summer Olympics, he lost to Expedito Alencar of Brazil.
