= Mario Guilloti =

Argentine boxer (1946–2021)

Personal information
- Full name: Mario Guilloti González
- Born: 20 May 1946 Chacabuco, Buenos Aires, Argentina
- Died: 24 August 2021 (aged 75) Avellaneda, Buenos Aires, Argentina
- Height: 164 cm (5 ft 5 in)
- Weight: 67 kg (148 lb)

Sport
- Sport: Boxing
- Weight class: Welterweight
Medal record
Men's boxing
Representing Argentina
Olympic Games
Bronze medal – third place	1968 Mexico City	Welterweight -67 kg
Pan American Games
Silver medal – second place	1967 Winnipeg	Welterweight -67 kg

Mario Guilloti González (Note: In this Spanish name, the first or paternal surname is Guilloti and the second or maternal family name is González.) (20 May 1946 – 24 August 2021) was an Argentine boxer.

He won the bronze medal in the men's welterweight (– 67 kg) category at the 1968 Summer Olympics in Mexico City, Mexico. A year earlier he claimed the silver medal at the 1967 Pan American Games. He was born in Chacabuco.

Guilloti died from Covid-19 in 2021 aged 75.
