= Earl Liburd =

Virgin Islands boxer (born 1954)

Personal information
- Nationality: American Virgin Islander
- Born: March 24, 1954 (age 70)

Sport
- Sport: Boxing

Earl Liburd (born March 24, 1954) is a boxer who represents the United States Virgin Islands. He competed in the men's light middleweight event at the 1976 Summer Olympics.
