= Expedito Alencar =

Brazilian boxer

Personal information
- Born: 24 February 1946; Ceará, Brazil
- Died: 31 May 1997 (aged 51)

Sport
- Sport: Boxing

Expedito Alencar (24 February 1946 – 31 May 1997) was a Brazilian boxer. He competed in the men's welterweight event at the 1968 Summer Olympics.
