= Alfonso Ramírez (boxer) =

Mexican boxer (born 1943)

Personal information
- Full name: Alfonso Ramírez Gutiérrez
- Born: 31 July 1943 (age 82) Mexico City, Mexico
- Height: 181 cm (5 ft 11 in)
- Weight: 67 kg (148 lb)

Sport
- Sport: Boxing
- Weight class: Welterweight
Medal record
Men's boxing
Representing Mexico
Pan American Games
Bronze medal – third place	1967 Winnipeg	Welterweight -67 kg

Alfonso Ramírez Gutiérrez (Note: In this Spanish name, the first or paternal surname is Ramírez and the second or maternal family name is Gutiérrez.) (born 31 July 1943) is a Mexican boxer. He competed at the 1964 Summer Olympics and the 1968 Summer Olympics.
