= Anthony Richardson (boxer) =

Dutch light-middleweight boxer (born 1947)

Earl Anthony Richardson (born February 7, 1947) is a retired light-middleweight boxer from the Netherlands, who represented his country at the 1972 Summer Olympics. There he was eliminated in the third round of the men's light-middleweight (– 71 kg) division by Loucif Hamani from Algeria. Earlier, after receiving a bye in the first round, Richardson defeated Svetomir Belić of Yugoslavia in his second round bout. Richardson was born in Anguilla and was affiliated with Hoogenband Boxing Club from The Hague.
