= Sporting Club =

Kansas City investors who own a portfolio of athletic organizations

- Formerly: OnGoal, LLC
- Headquarters: Kansas City, Missouri, United States

Sporting Club, formerly OnGoal, LLC, is a group of Kansas City investors that owns or represents a portfolio of athletic organizations under the Sporting Club umbrella. Its flagship property is Major League Soccer franchise Sporting Kansas City.

Sporting Club consists of four principals: Clifford Illig (co-founder and vice-chairman of the Cerner board), Greg Maday (CEO of SpecChem), Robb Heineman (CEO of Sporting Club), and Kansas City Chiefs quarterback Patrick Mahomes, who joined the ownership group in 2021. Pat Curran (founder of C3 Holdings) and Neal Patterson (CEO and co-founder of the Cerner Corporation) were prior partners before dying in 2024 and 2017, respectively.

== Sporting Kansas City ==
On August 31, 2006, Sporting Club bought the Wizards from their previous owner, Lamar Hunt, for about $20 million, shortly before Hunt's death that December. In June 2007, Sporting Club opened a world-class training center at Swope Soccer Village. The training facility was developed through a public-private partnership between the Kansas City Parks and Recreation Department and Sporting Club. In December 2007, Sporting Club received approval for approximately $275 million of public financing to create a soccer-specific stadium in Kansas City, Kansas.

== Sporting Kansas City II ==
In October 2015, the club announced the formation of Swope Park Rangers, a United Soccer League club serving as the senior team's reserve squad. The team is now known as Sporting Kansas City II and started competing in the MLS Next Pro league in 2022.

== Sporting Kansas City Academy Youth Development Program ==
The Sporting KC Academy was formed in 2007, and the development program consists of six teams: U12s, U13s, U14s, U15s, U17s, and U19s. The U15s, U17s, & U19s teams compete as members of the U.S. Soccer Development Academy. SKC academy players have the opportunity to eventually join the Sporting Kansas City first team without going through the MLS draft process. SKC academy home games are played at the Sporting Club Training Center.

The club maintains the Sporting Club Network, with clubs in Missouri, Tennessee, Kansas, Nebraska, Iowa, and Arkansas.

== Interest in Everton ==
In October 2015, the club was linked to a potential purchase of Barclays Premier League club Everton F.C. for $347 million. Heineman addressed these rumors and confirmed that they had been interested in buying Everton and explored it in August but never entered serious talks to buy. Heineman didn't rule out the prospect of a future takeover of a Premier League club.
