= Manfred Wolke =

East German boxer (1943–2024)

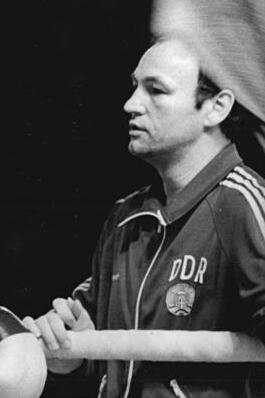
- Wolke in 1983

Personal information
- Born: 14 January 1943 Babelsberg, Gau March of Brandenburg, Germany
- Died: 29 May 2024 (aged 81) Frankfurt (Oder), Brandenburg, Germany
- Height: 1.76 m (5 ft 9 in)
- Weight: 67 kg (148 lb)

Boxing career
- Weight class: Welterweight
Medal record
Men's Boxing
Representing East Germany
Olympic Games
Gold medal – first place	1968 Mexico City	Welterweight
European Amateur Championships
Silver medal – second place	1967 Rome	Welterweight
Silver medal – second place	1971 Madrid	Welterweight

Manfred Wolke (14 January 1943 – 29 May 2024) was a German welterweight boxer. He was a member of the Armeesportsklub Vorwärts Frankfurt an der Oder.

Wolke, representing East Germany, was the Welterweight Olympic gold medalist at the 1968 Mexico City Olympic Games. Wolke defeated Joseph Bessala of Cameroon on a 4–1 decision in the final. In 1972, he was knocked out by Cuba's Emilio Correa and did not win a medal.

After his boxing career ended, Wolke became a trainer, most notably working with 1990s heavyweight contenders Axel Schulz and Henry Maske, and later with Francesco Pianeta.

Wolke died on 29 May 2024, at the age of 81.

== 1968 Olympic results ==
Below are the results of Manfred Wolke, a welterweight boxer from East Germany who competed at the 1968 Mexico City Olympics:

- Round of 64: bye
- Round of 32: defeated Andres Molina (Cuba) by decision, 4–1
- Round of 16: defeated Expedito Arrais (Brazil) by decision, 5–0
- Quarterfinal: defeated Celal Sandal (Turkey) by decision, 4–1
- Semifinal: defeated Vladimir Musalinov (Soviet Union) by decision, 3–2
- Final: defeated Joseph Bessala (Cameroon) by decision, 4–1 (won gold medal)
