= Loucif Hamani =

Algerian boxer (1950–2021)

Personal information
- Nationality: Algerian
- Born: 15 May 1950 Igoufaf, Tizi Ouzou Province, Algeria
- Died: 9 November 2021 (aged 71) Vitry-sur-Seine, Val-de-Marne, France

Sport
- Sport: Boxing
Medal record
Men's amateur boxing
Representing Algeria
All-Africa Games
| Gold medal – first place | 1973 Lagos | Light-middleweight |

Loucif Hamani (15 May 1950 – 9 November 2021) was an Algerian boxer who competed at the 1972 Summer Olympic Games in the light-middleweight event where he reached the quarter finals before losing to Alan Minter of Great Britain. Earlier, Hamani defeated José Antonio Colon of Puerto Rico in his first bout and Anthony Richardson of the Netherlands in his second. Hamani was born in Igoufaf, Tizi Ouzou Province.

He later turned professional winning 24 of his 27 fights and was African Boxing Union super welterweight champion. One of his three professional losses was a second-round knockout against Marvin Hagler on 16 February 1980 in Portland, Maine. He was awarded the African Golden Glove in 2005.

He died of Parkinson's disease complications in 2021.
