= Mohamed Majeri =

Tunisian boxer (born 1948)

Personal information
- Nationality: Tunisian
- Born: 23 August 1948 (age 76)

Sport
- Sport: Boxing

Mohamed Majeri (born 23 August 1948) is a Tunisian boxer. He competed in the men's light middleweight event at the 1972 Summer Olympics.
