= Rabah Labiod =

Algerian boxer (born 1948)

Rabah Labiod (born 26 March 1948 in Constantine) is a former Algerian boxer. He competed at the 1968 Summer Olympics in the welterweight event, during which he lost in the first round.

== 1968 Olympic results ==
Below is the record of Rabah Labiod, an Algerian welterweight boxer who competed at the 1968 Mexico City Olympics:

- Round of 64: lost to Julius Luipa (Zambia) by decision, 1-4
