= Mohammad Azarhazin =

Iranian boxer

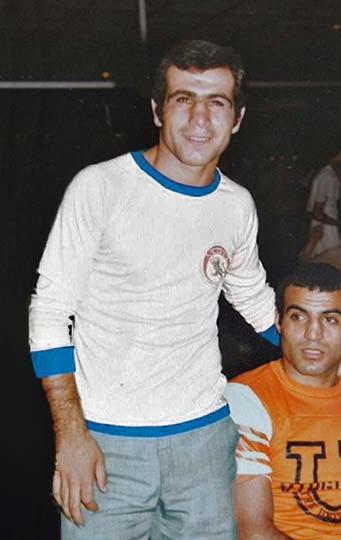
- Azarhazin (left) in 1977

Personal information
- Born: January 8, 1951 (age 75)
- Height: 173 cm (5 ft 8 in)

Sport
- Sport: Boxing
Medal record
Representing Iran
Asian Championships
Gold medal – first place	1977 Jakarta	-71 kg

Mohammad Azarhazin (Persian: محمد آذر حزین, born January 8, 1951) is a retired Iranian amateur boxer who won a gold medal at the 1977 Asian Championships. He competed at the 1976 Olympics and was eliminated in the second bout.
