= Nayden Stanchev =

Bulgarian boxer (born 1949)

Personal information
- Nationality: Bulgarian
- Born: 14 January 1949 (age 76); Plovdiv, Bulgaria

Sport
- Sport: Boxing

Nayden Stanchev (born 14 January 1949) is a Bulgarian boxer. He competed at the 1972 Summer Olympics and the 1976 Summer Olympics.
