= Alfredo Lemus =

Venezuelan boxer (born 1952)

Personal information
- Nationality: Venezuelan
- Born: 1 April 1952 (age 74)

Sport
- Sport: Boxing
Medal record
Men's boxing
Representing Venezuela
World Championships
Silver medal – second place	1974 Havana	Light Middleweight
Pan American Games
Bronze medal – third place	1975 Mexico City	Light Middleweight

Alfredo Lemus (born 1 April 1952) is a Venezuelan boxer. He competed at the 1972 Summer Olympics and the 1976 Summer Olympics. He finished in third place at the 1975 Pan American Games in the light-middleweight division.
