= Kalevi Kosunen =

Finnish boxer

Personal information
- Nationality: Finnish
- Born: 17 January 1947 (age 78); Salla, Finland

Sport
- Sport: Boxing

Kalevi Kosunen (born 17 January 1947) is a Finnish boxer. He competed in the men's light middleweight event at the 1976 Summer Olympics.
