= Wiesław Rudkowski =

Polish boxer (1946–2016)

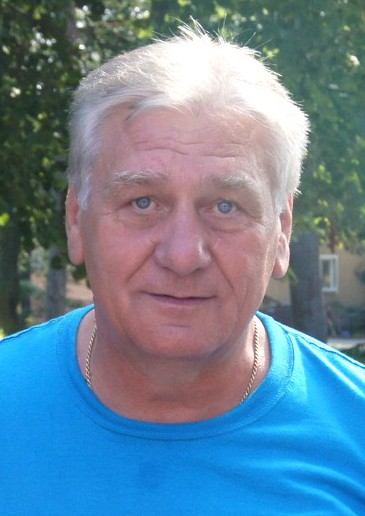

Personal information
- Born: 17 November 1946 Łódź, Poland
- Died: 14 February 2016 (aged 69) Warsaw, Poland
Medal record
Men's Boxing
Representing Poland
Olympic Games
Silver medal – second place	1972 Munich	Light Middleweight
European Championships
Gold medal – first place	1975 Katowice	Light Middleweight
Silver medal – second place	1973 Belgrade	Light Middleweight
Bronze medal – third place	1971 Madrid	Light Middleweight

Wiesław Ksawery Rudkowski (17 November 1946 – 14 February 2016) was a Polish boxer and Olympic silver medalist. He lost the gold medal match to Dieter Kottysch.
