= Evangelos Oikonomakos =

Greek boxer (born 1945)

Personal information
- Nationality: Greek
- Born: 14 July 1945 (age 79); Athens, Greece

Sport
- Sport: Boxing

Evangelos Oikonomakos (born 14 July 1945) is a Greek boxer. He competed at the 1968 Summer Olympics and the 1972 Summer Olympics.
