= Argentina at the 1972 Summer Olympics =

- IOC code: ARG
- NOC: Argentine Olympic Committee

in Munich
- Competitors: 92 (88 men and 4 women) in 12 sports
- Flag bearer: Carlos Delía
- Medals Ranked 33rd: Gold 0 Silver 1 Bronze 0 Total 1

Summer Olympics appearances (overview)
- 1900; 1904; 1908; 1912; 1920; 1924; 1928; 1932; 1936; 1948; 1952; 1956; 1960; 1964; 1968; 1972; 1976; 1980; 1984; 1988; 1992; 1996; 2000; 2004; 2008; 2012; 2016; 2020; 2024; 2028

Argentina competed at the 1972 Summer Olympics in Munich, West Germany. 92 competitors, 88 men and 4 women, took part in 62 events in 12 sports.

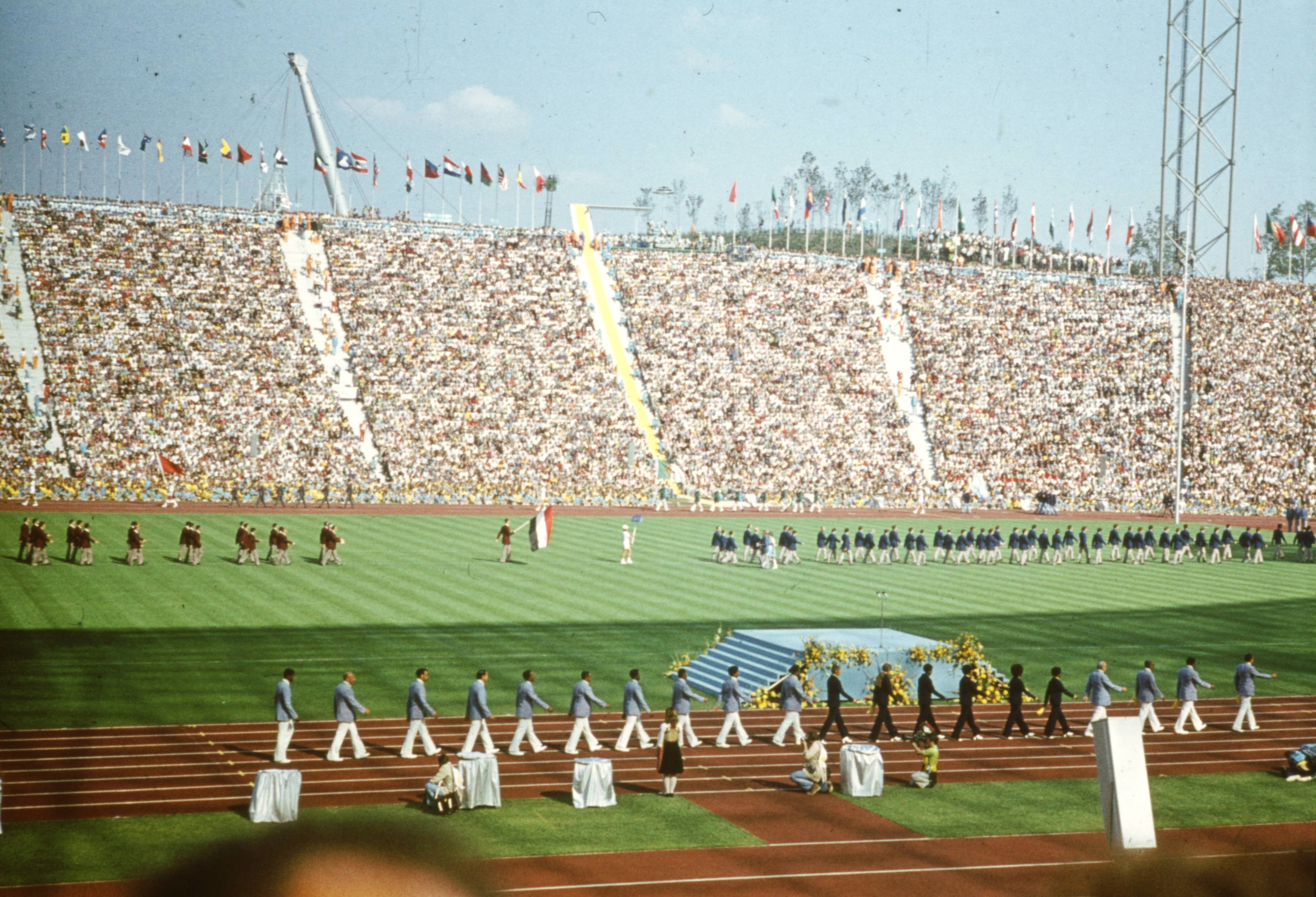
the team of Argentina (at the background track on the right) entering in the opening ceremony

== Medalists ==
Medal	Name	Sport	Event
Silver	Alberto Demiddi	Rowing	Men's single sculls

== Athletics ==
Men

Athlete	Events	Heat		Quarterfinal		Semifinal		Final	
Athlete	Events	Result	Rank	Result	Rank	Result	Rank	Result	Rank
Andrés Calonge	100 m	10.73	4	did not advance					
Andrés Calonge	200 m	21.39	3 Q	21.11	6	did not advance			
Carlos Dalurzo	800 m	1:50.6	5	—N/a		did not advance			
Nazario Araujo	Marathon	—N/a						did not finish	
Ramón Cabrera	Marathon	—N/a						2:42:37.2	55
Fernando Molina	Marathon	—N/a						2:38:18.6	53
Adalberto Scorza	50 km walk	—N/a						4:42:41.4	28
Luis Barrionuevo	High jump	1.90	=36	—N/a				did not advance	
José Vallejo	Hammer throw	60.08	30	—N/a				did not advance	

Women

Athlete	Events	Heat		Quarterfinal		Semifinal		Final	
Athlete	Events	Result	Rank	Result	Rank	Result	Rank	Result	Rank
Irene Fitzer	100 m	12.51	8	did not advance					

== Boxing ==
Athlete	Event	Round of 64	Round of 32	Round of 16	Quarterfinals	Semifinals	Final
Athlete	Event	Opposition Result	Opposition Result	Opposition Result	Opposition Result	Opposition Result	Rank
Carlos Leyes	Light flyweight	—N/a	Ivanov (URS); L 0 – 5	did not advance			
Mario Ortíz	Featherweight	Bye	Vellón (PUR); W 4 – 1	Lindberg (FIN); L 1 – 4	did not advance		
Antonio Comaschi	Lightweight	Bye	Altanhuiag (MGL); L 0 – 5	did not advance			
Walter Gómez	Light Welterweight	—N/a	Pierwieniecki (POL); W 5 – 0	Angelov (BUL); L 1 – 4	did not advance		
Miguel Angel Cuello	Light Heavyweight	—N/a	Sachse (GDR); W 4 – 1	Culineac (ROU); W (TKO-2)	Parlov (YUG); L (W/O)	did not advance	

== Cycling ==
Eight cyclists represented Argentina in 1972.

Road race, time trial

Athlete	Event	Time	Rank
Roberto Breppe	Men's individual road race	did not finish	
Fernando Jiménez	Men's 1000m time trial	1:10.30	21

Sprint

Athlete	Event	Round 1 Repechage		Round 2 Repechage		1/8 Finals Repechage		Quarterfinals		Semifinals		Final	
Athlete	Event	Time	Rank	Time	Rank	Time	Rank	Time	Rank	Time	Rank	Time	Rank
Víctor Limba	Men's sprint		2 DSQ	did not advance									
Carlos Reybaud	Men's sprint	11.50	1 Q		2; 2	did not advance							

Pursuit

Athlete	Event	Qualification		Quarterfinals		Semifinals		Final	
Athlete	Event	Time	Rank	Time	Rank	Time	Rank	Time	Rank
Carlos Alvarez	Men's individual pursuit		6 Q	4:57.09	2	did not advance			
Carlos Alvarez; Raúl Gómez; Raúl Halket; Ismael Torres	Men's team pursuit		16	did not advance					

== Equestrian ==
=== Eventing ===
Athlete	Horse	Event	Dressage		Cross-country		Show jumping		Total	
Athlete	Horse	Event	Points	Rank	Points	Rank	Points	Rank	Points	Rank
José Eugenio Acosta	Saxofón	Individual	-85.00	71	did not finish					
Carlos Alvarado	Rastreador	Individual	-64.33	=47	did not finish					
Alejandro Guglielmi	Aguilucho	Individual	-59.67	=35	did not finish					
Gerardo Jáuregui	Constanza	Individual	-77.67	66	-23.25	42	-200.40	47	-301.32	47
José Eugenio Acosta; Carlos Alvarado; Alejandro Guglielmi; Gerardo Jáuregui	Saxofón; Rastreador; Aguilucho; Constanza	Team	-201.67	18	54.40	11	did not finish			

=== Show jumping ===
Athlete	Horse	Event	Qualifying round		Total	
Athlete	Horse	Event	Penalties	Rank	Penalties	Rank
Hugo Arrambide	Camalote	Individual	12.00	=22	did not advance	
Carlos Delía	Cardón	Individual	12.25	29	did not advance	
Jorge Llambí	Okey Amigo	Individual	12.00	=22	did not finish	
Hugo Arrambide; Jorge Llambí; Argentino Molinuevo, Jr. Roberto Tagle	Camalote; Okey Amigo; Abracadabra; Simple	Team	12.00	=22	did not finish	

== Fencing ==
Athlete	Event	First round		Second round		Quarterfinal		Semifinal		Final	
Athlete	Event	Record	Rank	Record	Rank	Record	Rank	Record	Rank	Record	Rank
Daniel Feraud	Men's épée	2W – 3L	4 Q	0W – 5L	6	did not advance					
Fernando Lupiz	Men's foil	3W – 3L	5	did not advance							
Fernando Lupiz	Men's sabre	1W – 4L	5	did not advance							
Guillermo Saucedo	Men's épée	2W – 3L	5	did not advance							
Guillermo Saucedo	Men's foil	4W – 2L	3 Q	3W – 2L	3 Q	0W – 5L	6	did not advance			
Guillermo Saucedo	Men's sabre	1W – 4L	5	did not advance							
Omar Vergara	Men's épée	2W – 2L	4 Q	3W – 2L	4	did not advance					
Omar Vergara	Men's foil	2W – 3L	4 Q	0W – 5L	6	did not advance					
Daniel Feraud; Fernando Lupiz; Guillermo Saucedo; Omar Vergara	Men's team épée	0W – 4L	4	did not advance							
Sylvia Iannuzzi-San Martín	Women's foil	1W – 4L	6	—N/a		did not advance					

== Field hockey ==
Ernesto Barreiros
Fernando Calp
Julio César Cufre
Flavio de Giacomi
Gerardo Lorenzo
Luis Antonio Costa
Héctor Marinoni
Osvaldo Monti

Jorge Piccioli
Daniel Portugués
Alfredo Quaquarini
Horacio Rognoni
Alberto Sabbione
Jorge Sabbione
Gabriel Scally
Ovidio Sodor

Group play

	Team	Pts	P	W	D	L	GF	GA
1	West Germany	13	7	6	1	0	17	5
2	Pakistan	11	7	5	1	1	17	6
3	Malaysia	9	7	4	1	2	9	7
4	Spain	8	7	2	4	1	9	8
5	Belgium	5	7	2	1	4	8	14
6	France	4	7	2	0	5	6	13
7	Argentina	3	7	0	3	4	4	9
8	Uganda	3	7	0	3	4	6	14

Qualified for semifinals

August 27, 1972

Spain	1 – 1	Argentina

August 28, 1972

Belgium	1 – 1	Argentina

August 29, 1972

West Germany	2 – 1	Argentina

August 31, 1972

Argentina	0 – 0	Uganda

September 1, 1972

Pakistan	3 – 1	Argentina

September 3, 1972

France	1 – 0	Argentina

September 4, 1972

Malaysia	1 – 0	Argentina

== Judo ==
Athlete	Event	Round of 64	Round of 32	Round of 16	Quarterfinals	Semifinals	Repechage 1	Repechage 2	Bronze medal	Final
Athlete	Event	Opposition Result	Opposition Result	Opposition Result	Opposition Result	Opposition Result	Opposition Result	Opposition Result	Opposition Result	Rank
Antonio Gallina	Men's -80 kg	Bye	Ipacs (HUN); L	did not advance						
Antonio Gallina	Men's open category	—N/a	Bye	Shinomaki (JPN); L	did not advance					

== Rowing ==
Athlete	Event	Heats		Repechage		Semifinals		Final	
Athlete	Event	Time	Rank	Time	Rank	Time	Rank	Time	Rank
Alberto Demiddi	Men's single sculls	7:46.09	1 Q	BYE		8:10.01	1 FA	7:11.53	2nd place, silver medalist(s)
Ricardo Ibarra; Jorge Imaz	Men's double sculls	7:18.28	4	7:22.15	3	did not advance			
Rafael Garba; Raúl Mazerati; Pedro Yucciolino	Men's double sculls	8:20.19	5	8:31.51	4	did not advance			
José Manuel Bugia; Oscar de Andrés; Tomás Forray; Luciano Wilk	Men's double sculls	6:59.72	3	7:12.74	3	did not advance			
Hugo Aberastegui; Héctor Biassini; Oscar de Dios; Juan Carlos Estol; Alfredo Martín; Raúl Mazerati; Ricardo José Rodríguez; Ignacio Ruiz; Guillermo Segurado	Men's eight	6:20.31	3 Q	Bye		6:47.72	6	did not advance	

== Sailing ==
Athlete	Event	Race							Net points	Final rank
Athlete	Event	1	2	3	4	5	6	7	Net points	Final rank
Roberto Haas	Finn	29.0	37.0	~~41.0~~	34.0	29.0	41.0	34.0	204.0	32
Guillermo Calegari; Luis Schenone	Star	~~23.0~~	23.0	21.0	22.0	23.0	23.0	22.0	134.0	18
Ricardo Boneo; Pedro Ferrero; Héctor Campos	Soling	~~30.0~~	31.0	27.0	13.0	22.0	22.0	—N/a	114.0	22
César Sebök; Jorge Alberto Salas; Pedro Sisti	Dragon	25.0	~~32.0~~	27.0	27.0	18.0	26.0	—N/a	123.0	23

== Shooting ==
Five male shooters represented Argentina in 1972.

Athlete	Event	Points	Rank
Nelson Torno	25 m rapid fire pistol	569	48
Jorge di Giandoménico	50 m rifle three positions	1,098	52
Ricardo Rusticucci	50 m rifle prone	592	38
Enrique Rebora	50 m running target	547	11
Firmo Roberti	Skeet	188	26

== Swimming ==
Athlete	Event	Heat		Semifinal		Final	
Athlete	Event	Time	Rank	Time	Rank	Time	Rank
Osvaldo Boretto	Men's 100 m breaststroke	1:09.64	24	did not advance			
Osvaldo Boretto	Men's 200 m breaststroke	DSQ		—N/a		did not advance	
Gustavo González	Men's 400 m freestyle	4:21.22	34	—N/a		did not advance	
Gustavo González	Men's 1500 m freestyle	17:23.53	27	—N/a		did not advance	
Gustavo González	Men's 100 m backstroke	1:04.16	31	did not advance			
Gustavo González	Men's 200 m backstroke	2:19.74	26	—N/a		did not advance	
Silvia Borgini	Women's 200 m freestyle	2:23.11	27	—N/a		did not advance	
Silvia Borgini	Women's 800 m freestyle	10:06.39	30	—N/a		did not advance	
Silvia Borgini	Women's 400 m individual medley	5:44.22	38	—N/a		did not advance	
Patricia López	Women's 400 m freestyle	4:59.68	31	—N/a		did not advance	
Patricia López	Women's 800 m freestyle	10:09.19	33	—N/a		did not advance	
Patricia López	Women's 100 m backstroke	1:12.13	31	did not advance			
Patricia López	Women's 200 m backstroke	2:33.41	30	—N/a		did not advance	
Patricia López	Women's 200 m individual medley	2:42.08	41	—N/a		did not advance	

== Wrestling ==
Men's freestyle

Athlete	Event	Round 1	Round 2	Round 3	Round 4	Round 5	Round 6	Final	
Athlete	Event	Opposition Result	Opposition Result	Opposition Result	Opposition Result	Opposition Result	Opposition Result	Opposition Result	Rank
Eduardo Maggiolo	–57 kg	Fuentes (GUA); W (P)	Barry (AUS); W (TF)	Sanders (USA); L (TF)	Premnath (IND); L (TF)	did not advance			
Nestor González	–74 kg	Nitschke (GDR); L (TF)	Musil (TCH); L (TF)	did not advance					
Jesús Blanco	–82 kg	Martinetti (SUI); L (P)	Iorga (ROU); L (TF)	did not advance					

Men's Greco-Roman

Athlete	Event	Round 1	Round 2	Round 3	Round 4	Round 5	Round 6	Round 7	Final	
Athlete	Event	Opposition Result	Opposition Result	Opposition Result	Opposition Result	Opposition Result	Opposition Result	Opposition Result	Opposition Result	Rank
Eduardo Maggiolo	–57 kg	Grilo (POR); L (P)	Veil (FRG); L (TF)	did not advance						
Nestor González	–74 kg	Türüt (TUR); L (TF)	Mácha (TCH); L (TF)	did not advance			—N/a		did not advance	
Jesús Blanco	–82 kg	Yağmur (TUR); L (TF)	Robinson (USA); L (TF)	did not advance			—N/a		did not advance	

Key

- DQ – Won/lost by passivity.
- TF – Won/lost by fall.
- P – Won/lost by points.
