= Boxing at the 1972 Summer Olympics – Featherweight =

Olympic boxing tournament

Featherweight boxing at the Games of the XX Olympiad
- Venue: Boxing Hall, Munich
- Dates: 27 August – 10 September 1972
- Competitors: 45 from 45 nations

Medalists
1st place, gold medalist(s)		Boris Kuznetsov	Soviet Union
2nd place, silver medalist(s)		Philip Waruinge	Kenya
3rd place, bronze medalist(s)		Clemente Rojas	Colombia
3rd place, bronze medalist(s)		András Botos	Hungary

The men's featherweight event was part of the boxing programme at the 1972 Summer Olympics. The weight class allowed boxers of up to 57 kilograms to compete. The competition was held from 27 August to 10 September 1972. 45 boxers from 45 nations competed.

== Medalists ==
Gold	Boris Kuznetsov; Soviet Union
Silver	Philip Waruinge; Kenya
Bronze	Clemente Rojas; Colombia
Bronze	András Botos; Hungary

== Results ==
The following boxers took part in the event:

Rank	Name	Country
1	Boris Kuznetsov	Soviet Union
2	Philip Waruinge	Kenya
3T	Clemente Rojas	Colombia
3T	András Botos	Hungary
5T	Jouko Lindbergh	Finland
5T	Antonio Rubio	Spain
5T	Kazuo Kobayashi	Japan
5T	Gabriel Pometcu	Romania
9T	Mohamed Salah Amin	Egypt
9T	Mario Ortíz	Argentina
9T	Kuncho Kunchev	Bulgaria
9T	Habibu Kinyogoli	Tanzania
9T	Pasqualino Morbidelli	Italy
9T	Louis Self	United States
9T	Ryszard Tomczyk	Poland
9T	Jochen Bachfeld	East Germany
17T	Guy Segbaya	Togo
17T	Jabbar Feli	Iran
17T	Deogratias Musoke	Uganda
17T	José Luis Vellon	Puerto Rico
17T	Palamdorjiin Bayar	Mongolia
17T	Dale Anderson	Canada
17T	Jungle Thangata	Malawi
17T	Soth Sun	Khmer Republic
17T	Pat Ryan	New Zealand
17T	Seyfi Tatar	Turkey
17T	Angelos Theotokatos	Greece
17T	Michael Andrews	Nigeria
17T	José Baptista	Venezuela
17T	Ruedi Vogel	Switzerland
17T	Billy Taylor	Great Britain
17T	Orlando Palacios	Cuba
33T	Morgan Mwenya	Zambia
33T	Lema Yemane	Ethiopia
33T	Maurice Apeang	France
33T	Abdou Faye	Senegal
33T	Preecha Nopparat	Thailand
33T	Emmanuel Eloundou	Cameroon
33T	Harouna Lago	Niger
33T	Joseph M'Bouroukounda	Gabon
33T	Juan Francisco García	Mexico
33T	Peter Prause	West Germany
33T	Lahcen Maghfour	Morocco
33T	Nils Dag Strømme	Norway
33T	Joe Cofie	Ghana

=== First round ===
- Pasqualino Morbidelli (ITA) def. Morgan Mwenya (ZAM), 5:0
- Angelos Theotokatos (GRE) def. Lema Yemane (ETH), 5:0
- Louis Self (USA) def. Maurice Apeang (FRA), 5:0
- Michael Andrews (NGR) def. Abdou Faye (SEN), 5:0
- András Botos (HUN) def. Nopparat Preecha (THA), 5:0
- José Baptista (VEN) def. Emmanuel Eloundou (CMR), 5:0
- Boris Kuznetsov (URS) def. Harouna Lago (NIG), KO-1
- Rudolf Vogel (SUI) def. Joseph Mbourokounda (GAB), 3:2
- Ryszard Tomczyk (POL) def. Juan Francisco García (MEX), 4:1
- Jochen Bachfeld (GDR) def. Peter Prause (FRG), 5:0
- William Taylor (GBR) def. Lahcen Maghfour (MAR), 5:0
- Gabriel Pometcu (ROU) def. Nils Dag Stromme (NOR), KO-1
- Orlando Palacios (CUB) def. Joe Cofie (GHA), 4:1

=== Second round ===
- Salah Mohamed Amin (EGY) def. Guy Segbaya (TOG), 5:0
- Philip Waruinge (KEN) def. Jabbar Feli (IRI), 4:1
- Jouko Lindberg (FIN) def. Deogratias Musoke (UGA), 5:0
- Alberto Mario Ortíz (ARG) def. José Luis Vellón (PUR), 4:1
- Kuncho Kunchev (BUL) def. Palamdorj Baatar (MGL), 3:2
- Clemente Rojas (COL) def. Dale Anderson (CAN), 3:2
- Antonio Rubio (ESP) def. Jungle Thangata (MLW), TKO-3
- Habibu Kinyogoli (TNZ) def. Sun Soth (CMB), 5:0
- Royal Kobayashi (JPN) def. Pat Ryan (NZL), 4:1
- Pasqualino Morbidelli (ITA) def. Seyfi Tatar (TUR), 5:0
- Louis Self (USA) def. Angelos Theotokatos (GRE), 5:0
- András Botos (HUN) def. Michael Andrews (NGR), 5:0
- Boris Kuznetsov (URS) def. José Baptista (VEN), 3:2
- Ryszard Tomczyk (POL) def. Rudolf Vogel (SUI), KO-2
- Jochen Bachfeld (GDR) def. William Taylor (GBR), 5:0
- Gabriel Pometcu (ROU) def. Orlando Palacios (CUB), 4:1

=== Third round ===
- Philip Waruinge (KEN) def. Salah Mohamed Amin (EGY), 5:0
- Jouko Lindberg (FIN) def. Alberto Mario Ortíz (ARG), 4:1
- Clemente Rojas (COL) def. Kuncho Kunchev (BUL), walk-over
- Antonio Rubio (ESP) def. Habibu Kinyogoli (TNZ), 5:0
- Royal Kobayashi (JPN) def. Pasqualino Morbidelli (ITA), KO-1
- András Botos (HUN) def. Louis Self (USA), 3:2
- Boris Kuznetsov (URS) def. Ryszard Tomczyk (POL), 5:0
- Gabriel Pometcu (ROU) def. Jochen Bachfeld (GDR), 5:0

=== Quarterfinals ===
- Philip Waruinge (KEN) def. Jouko Lindberg (FIN), 4:1
- Clemente Rojas (COL) def. Antonio Rubio (ESP), DSQ-2
- András Botos (HUN) def. Royal Kobayashi (JPN), 4:1
- Boris Kuznetsov (URS) def. Gabriel Pometcu (ROU), 4:1

=== Semifinals ===
- Philip Waruinge (KEN) def. Clemente Rojas (COL), 3:2
- Boris Kuznetsov (URS) def. András Botos (HUN), 5:0

=== Final ===
- Boris Kuznetsov (URS) def. Philip Waruinge (KEN), 3:2
