= Boxing at the 1972 Summer Olympics – Lightweight =

Olympic boxing tournament

Lightweight boxing at the Games of the XX Olympiad
- Venue: Boxing Hall, Munich
- Dates: 27 August – 10 September 1972
- Competitors: 37 from 37 nations

Medalists
1st place, gold medalist(s)		Jan Szczepański	Poland
2nd place, silver medalist(s)		László Orbán	Hungary
3rd place, bronze medalist(s)		Samuel Mbugua	Kenya
3rd place, bronze medalist(s)		Alfonso Pérez	Colombia

The men's lightweight event was part of the boxing programme at the 1972 Summer Olympics. The weight class allowed boxers of up to 60 kilograms to compete. The competition was held from 27 August to 10 September 1972. 37 boxers from 37 nations competed.

== Medalists ==
Gold	Jan Szczepański; Poland
Silver	László Orbán; Hungary
Bronze	Samuel Mbugua; Kenya
Bronze	Alfonso Pérez; Colombia

== Results ==
The following boxers took part in the event:

Rank	Name	Country
1	Jan Szczepański	Poland
2	László Orbán	Hungary
3T	Samuel Mbugua	Kenya
3T	Alfonso Pérez	Colombia
5T	Charlie Nash	Ireland
5T	Sven Erik Paulsen	Norway
5T	Eraslan Doruk	Turkey
5T	Kim Tae-ho	South Korea
9T	Antonio Gin	Mexico
9T	James Busceme	United States
9T	Peter Hess	West Germany
9T	Muniswamy Venu	India
9T	Karel Kašpar	Czechoslovakia
9T	Khaidavyn Altankhuyag	Mongolia
9T	Antoniu Vasile	Romania
9T	Ivan Mikhaylov	Bulgaria
17T	Erik Madsen	Denmark
17T	Courtney Atherly	Guyana
17T	Kasamiro Kashri Marchlo	Sudan
17T	Vichit Praianan	Thailand
17T	Enrique Regüeiferos	Cuba
17T	Gennady Dobrokhotov	Soviet Union
17T	Girmaye Gabre	Ethiopia
17T	Neville Cole	Great Britain
17T	Tatu Chionga	Malawi
17T	Peter Odhiambo	Uganda
17T	Antonio Comaschi	Argentina
17T	Luis Rodríguez	Venezuela
17T	Adeyemi Abayomi	Nigeria
17T	Guitry Bananier	France
17T	Gianbattista Capretti	Italy
17T	Hassan Eghmaz	Iran
33T	Luis Davila	Puerto Rico
33T	Mohamed Sourour	Morocco
33T	Jose Martinez	Canada
33T	Roy Hurdley	Panama
33T	Abdel Hady Khallaf Allah	Egypt

=== First round ===
- Guitry Bananier (FRA) def. Luis Davila (PUR), 4:1
- László Orbán (HUN) def. Mohamed Sourour (MAR), 5:0
- Giambattista Capretti (ITA) def. José Martínez (CAN), TKO-2
- Ivan Mikhailov (BUL) def. Roy Hurdley (PAN), TKO-2
- Hosain Eghmaz (IRI) def. Abdel Hady Khallaf Allah (EGY), TKO-2

=== Second round ===
- Charlie Nash (IRL) def. Erik Madsen (DEN), 5:0
- Antonio Gin (MEX) def. Courtney Atherly (GUY), 4:1
- Jan Szczepanski (POL) def. Kasamiro Marchlo (SUD), 5:0
- James Busceme (USA) def. Praianan Vichit (THA), 5:0
- Peter Hess (FRG) def. Enrique Requeiferos (CUB), 4:1
- Svein Erik Paulsen (NOR) def. Gennadi Dobrokhotov (URS), TKO-1
- Muniswamy Venu (IND) def. Neville Cole (GBR), TKO-3
- Samuel Mbugua (KEN) def. Girmaye Gabre (ETH), 5:0
- Karel Kaspar (TCH) def. Tatu Chionga (MLW), 5:0
- Alfonso Pérez (COL) def. Odhiambo (UGA), 5:0
- Khaidav Altanhuiag (MGL) def. Antonio Comaschi (ARG), 5:0
- Eraslan Doruk (TUR) def. Luis Rodríguez (VEN), 5:0
- Antoniu Vasile (ROU) def. Adeyemi Abayomi (NGR), TKO-2
- Kim Tai-Ho (KOR) def. Guitry Bananier (FRA), KO-3
- László Orbán (HUN) def. Giambattista Capretti (ITA), 4:1
- Ivan Mikhailov (BUL) def. Hosain Eghmaz (IRI), 3:2

=== Third round ===
- Charlie Nash (IRL) def. Antonio Gin (MEX), TKO-1
- Jan Szczepanski (POL) def. James Busceme (USA), 5:0
- Svein Erik Paulsen (NOR) def. Peter Hess (FRG), KO-2
- Samuel Mbugua (KEN) def. Muniswamy Venu (IND), 5:0
- Alfonso Pérez (COL) def. Karel Kaspar (TCH), 5:0
- Eraslan Doruk (TUR) def. Khaidav Altanhuiag (MGL), 3:2
- Kim Tai-Ho (KOR) def. Antoniu Vasile (ROU), TKO-1
- László Orbán (HUN) def. Ivan Mikhailov (BUL), 4:1

=== Quarterfinals ===
- Jan Szczepanski (POL) def. Charlie Nash (IRL), TKO-3
- Samuel Mbugua (KEN) def. Svein Erik Paulsen (NOR), 4:1
- Alfonso Pérez (COL) def. Eraslan Doruk (TUR), 3:2
- László Orbán (HUN) def. Kim Tai-Ho (KOR), 4:1

=== Semifinals ===
- Jan Szczepanski (POL) def. Samuel Mbugua (KEN), walk-over
- László Orbán (HUN) def. Alfonso Pérez (COL), 3:2

=== Final ===
- Jan Szczepanski (POL) def. László Orbán (HUN), 5:0
