= Eraslan Doruk =

Turkish boxer (born 1949)

Personal information
- Nationality: Turkish
- Born: 10 September 1949 (age 75)

Sport
- Sport: Boxing

Eraslan Doruk (born 10 September 1949) is a Turkish boxer. He competed in the men's lightweight event at the 1972 Summer Olympics. At the 1972 Summer Olympics, he beat Luis Rodriguez and Khaidavyn Altankhuyag before losing to Alfonso Pérez.
