= Boxing at the 1968 Summer Olympics – Featherweight =

Boxing competitions

Men's Featherweight at the Games of the XIX Olympiad
- Venue: Arena México
- Dates: 15 – 26 October 1968
- Competitors: 32 from 32 nations

Medalists
1st place, gold medalist(s)		Antonio Roldán	Mexico
2nd place, silver medalist(s)		Al Robinson	United States
3rd place, bronze medalist(s)		Philip Waruinge	Kenya
3rd place, bronze medalist(s)		Ivan Mihailov	Bulgaria

The Featherweight class in the boxing competition was the fourth-lowest weight class. Featherweights were limited to those boxers weighing a maximum of 57 kilograms (125.7 lbs). The event took place between 15 and 26 October 1968 at Arena México.

Mexican Antonio Roldán won the gold medal after Al Robinson from the United States was controversially disqualified for alleged head-butting in the gold medal bout, and did not receive his silver medal. After a successful protest by American officials, Robinson was awarded silver. The losing semifinalists, Philip Waruinge from Kenya and Ivan Mihailov from Bulgaria, both received bronze medals.

== Competition format ==
32 boxers qualified for this category. Like all Olympic boxing events, the competition was a straight single-elimination tournament. Both semifinal losers were awarded bronze medals, so no boxers competed again after their first loss. Bouts consisted of six rounds each. Five judges scored each bout.

== Schedule ==
Date	Round
Tuesday 15 October 1968	First round
Thursday 17 October 1968	Second round
Tuesday 22 October 1968	Quarterfinals
Thursday 24 October 1968	Semifinals
Saturday 26 October 1968	Final Bout

== Results ==
=== Finals ===
Semifinals
Philip Waruinge (KEN)	2
Antonio Roldán (MEX)	3
Al Robinson (USA)	4
Ivan Mihailov (BUL)	1

Final
Antonio Roldán (MEX)	W
Al Robinson (USA)	DSQ

=== Top half ===
Round of 32
Miguel García (ARG)	3
Francisco Oduardo (CUB)	2
Aurel Simion (ROU)	5
Mario Santamaria (NCA)	0
Philip Waruinge (KEN)	5
Jean-Paul Anton (FRA)	0
Mohamed Sourour (MAR)	4
Ali Mebarki (ALG)	1
Elio Cotena (ITA)	5
Carl-Axel Palm (SWE)	0
Valery Plotnikov (URS)	5
Risto Meronen (FIN)	0
Edward Tracey (IRL)	4
Errol West (JAM)	1
Antonio Roldán (MEX)	5
Hwad Abdel (SUD)	0

Round of 16
Miguel García (ARG)	5
Aurel Simion (ROU)	0
Philip Waruinge (KEN)	5
Mohamed Sourour (MAR)	0
Elio Cotena (ITA)	2
Valery Plotnikov (URS)	3
Edward Tracey (IRL)	1
Antonio Roldán (MEX)	4

Quarterfinals
Miguel García (ARG)	1
Philip Waruinge (KEN)	4
Valery Plotnikov (URS)	1
Antonio Roldán (MEX)	3

Semifinals
Philip Waruinge (KEN)	2
Antonio Roldán (MEX)	3

=== Bottom half ===
Round of 32
Teogenes Pelegrino (PHI)	KO-2
Fantahun Seifu (ETH)	L
Al Robinson (USA)	W
John Cheshire (GBR)	RSC
Jovan Pajković (YUG)	5
Reinaldo Mercado (PUR)	0
Abdel Hady Khallaf Allah (RAU)	4
Mouldi Manai (TUN)	1
Seyfi Tatar (TUR)	5
Andrés Martín (ESP)	0
Kim Sung-eun (KOR)	3
Tadashi Okamoto (JPN)	2
Ivan Mihailov (BUL)	4
Jan Wadas (POL)	1
Nils Dag Strømme (NOR)	3
Werner Ruzicka (FRG)	2

Round of 16
Teogenes Pelegrino (PHI)	L
Al Robinson (USA)	KO-2
Jovan Pajković (YUG)	DSQ
Abdel Hady Khallaf Allah (RAU)	W
Seyfi Tatar (TUR)	3
Kim Sung-eun (KOR)	2
Ivan Mihailov (BUL)	5
Nils Dag Strømme (NOR)	0

Quarterfinals
Al Robinson (USA)	5
Abdel Hady Khallaf Allah (RAU)	0
Seyfi Tatar (TUR)	2
Ivan Mihailov (BUL)	3

Semifinals
Al Robinson (USA)	4
Ivan Mihailov (BUL)	1
