= András Botos =

Hungarian boxer (born 1952)

Personal information
- Born: March 6, 1952 (age 74) Salgótarján, Hungary
Medal record
Men's Boxing
Representing Hungary
Olympic Games
Bronze medal – third place	1972 Munich	Featherweight
European championships
Silver medal – second place	1971 Madrid	Featherweight
Bronze medal – third place	1975 Katowice	Lightweight

András Botos (born March 6, 1952) is a retired boxer, who won a bronze medal in the men's featherweight division (– 57 kilograms) at the 1972 Summer Olympics. He also competed at the 1976 Montreal Olympics as a lightweight boxer.

== 1972 Olympic results ==
Below is the record of András Botos, a Hungarian featherweight boxer who competed at the 1972 Munich Olympics:

- Round of 64 - Defeated Nopparat Preecha of Thailand by decision, 5-0
- Round of 32 - Defeated Michael Andrews of Nigeria by decision, 5-0
- Round of 16 - Defeated Louis Self of United States by decision, 3-2
- Quarterfinal - Defeated Royal Kobayashi of Japan by decision, 4-1
- Semifinal - Lost to Boris Kuznetsov of Soviet Union by decision, 0-5 (was awarded a bronze medal)

== 1976 Olympic results ==
Below is the record of András Botos, a Hungarian lightweight boxer who competed at the 1976 Montreal Olympics:

- Round of 64: bye
- Round of 32: defeated David Ssensonjo (Uganda) by walkover
- Round of 16: defeated Georgios Agrimavakis (Greece) by decision, 4-1
- Quarterfinal: lost to Vassily Solomin (Soviet Union) by decision, 0-5

== Life after boxing ==
He is currently the trainer of Hungarian boxer Vilmos Balog.
