= László Orbán (boxer) =

Hungarian boxer (1949–2009)

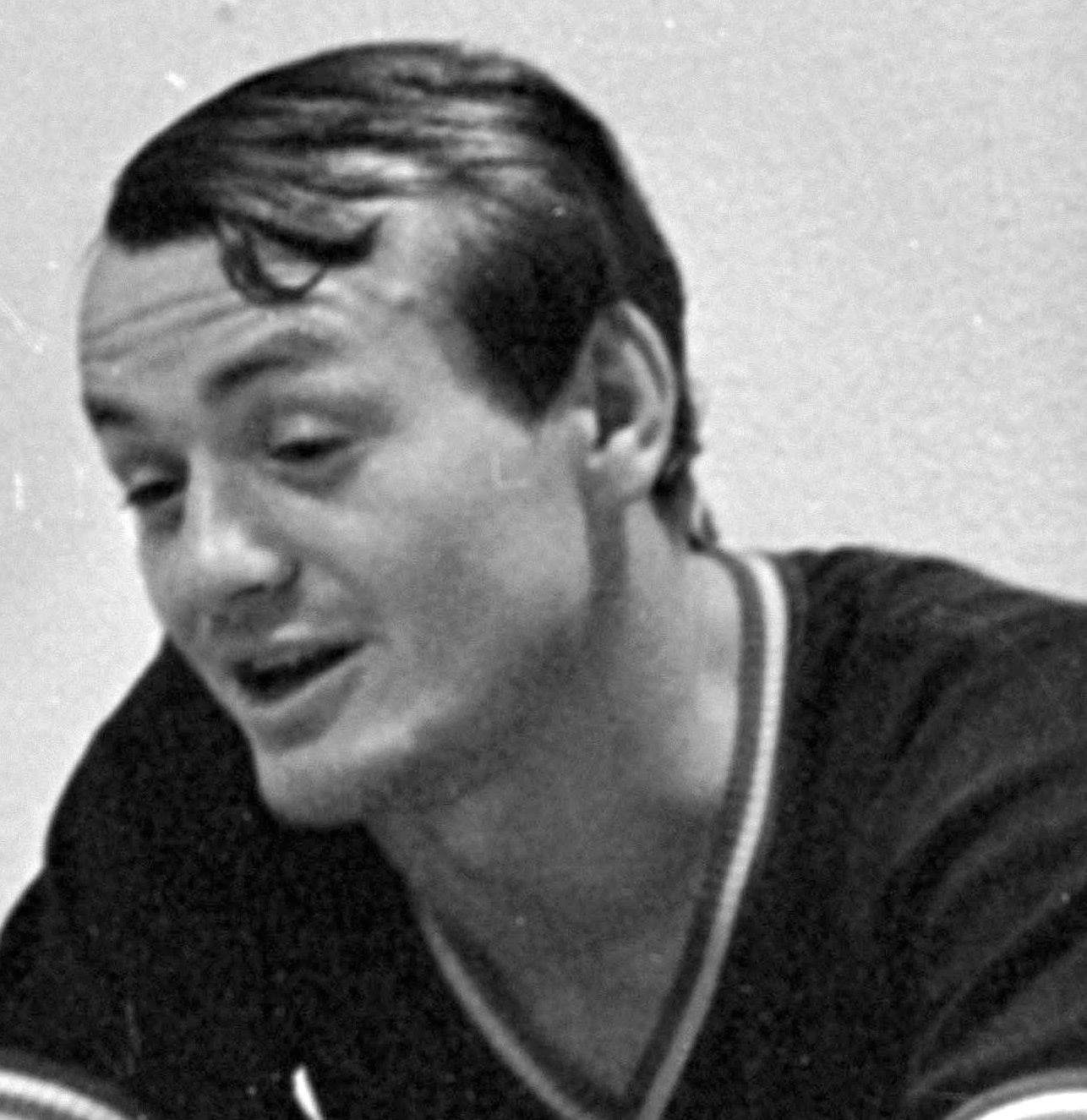
- Orbán in 1972

Personal information
- Born: December 9, 1949 Szekszárd, Hungary
- Died: July 15, 2009 (aged 59) Budapest, Hungary
Medal record
Men's boxing
Representing Hungary
Olympic Games
Silver medal – second place	1972 Munich	Lightweight
European championships
Gold medal – first place	1969 Bucharest	Featherweight
Bronze medal – third place	1971 Madrid	Lightweight

László Orbán (December 9, 1949 – July 15, 2009) was an amateur boxer from Hungary, who won the silver medal in the lightweight division (– 60 kg) at the 1972 Summer Olympics in Munich, West Germany. In the final he was defeated by Poland's Jan Szczepański on points, (5:0).

== 1972 Olympic results ==
Below are the results of László Orbán, a lightweight boxer from Hungary who competed at the 1972 Munich Olympics:

- Round of 64: defeated Mohamed Sourour (Morocco) on points, 5-0
- Round of 32: defeated Giambattista Capretti (Italy) on points, 4-1
- Round of 16: defeated Ivan Mikhailov (Bulgaria) on points, 4-1
- Quarterfinal: defeated Kim Tai-Ho (South Korea) on points, 4-1
- Semifinal: defeated Alfonso Perez (Colombia) on points, 3-2
- Final: lost to Jan Szczepanski (Poland) on points, 0-5 (awarded silver medal)
