= Muniswamy Venu =

Indian boxer

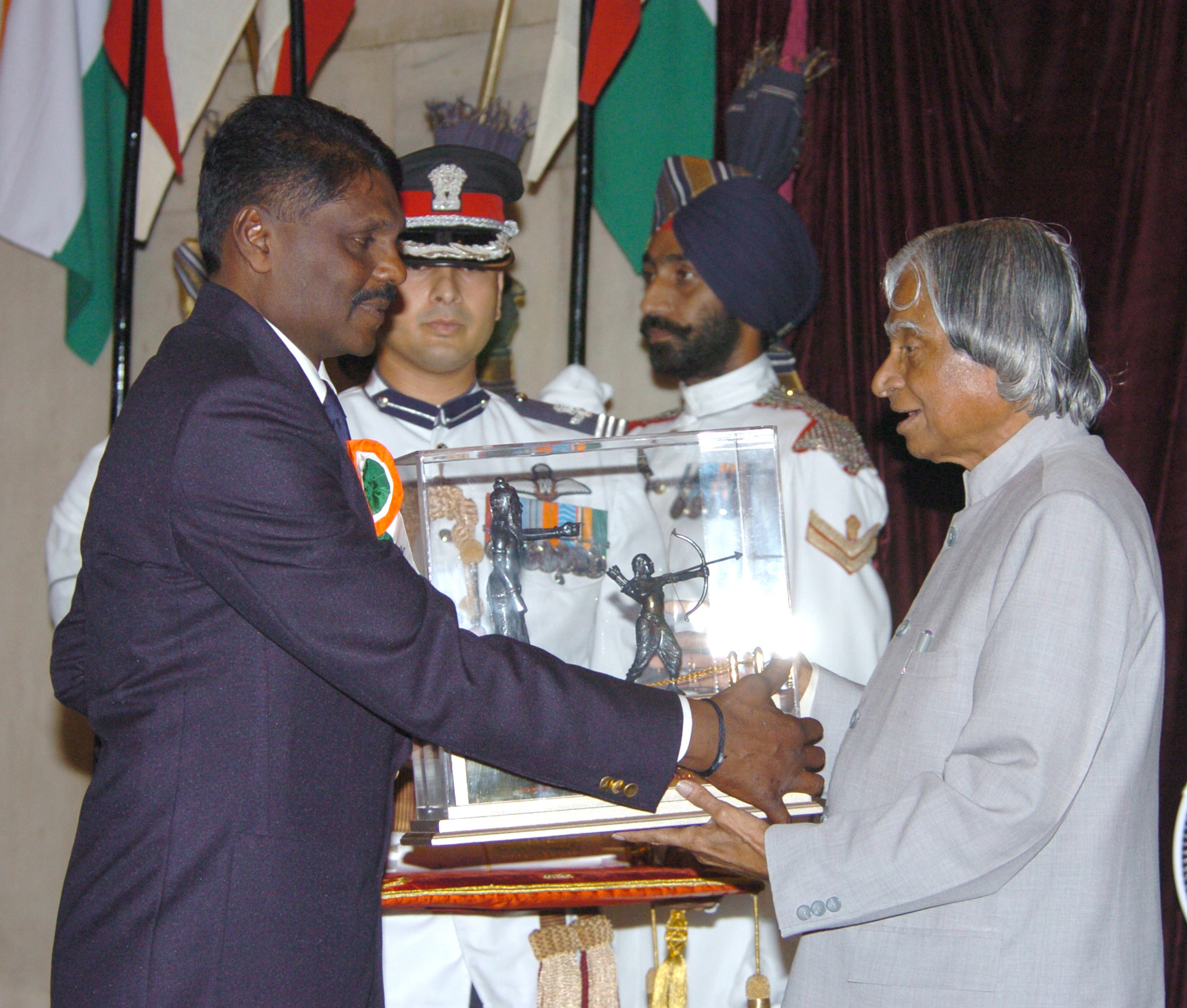
- Dr. A.P.J. Abdul Kalam presenting the Dronacharya Award to the Hony. Captain M. Venu, VSM

Personal information
- Nationality: Indian
- Born: 20 April 1946 (age 79)

Sport
- Sport: Boxing

Muniswamy Venu (born 20 April 1946) is an Indian boxer. He competed in the men's lightweight event at the 1972 Summer Olympics. At the 1972 Summer Olympics, he won his first fight, against Neville Cole of Great Britain, before losing to Samuel Mbugua of Kenya.
