= André Martin =

André Martin is the name of

- André Martin (philosopher) (1621–1695), French philosopher and priest
- André Martin-Legeay (1906–1940), French tennis player
- André Martin (sport shooter) (1908–1991), French sport shooter
- André Martin (soldier) (1911–2001), French Chief of the Defence Staff (1961–62)
- André Martin (physicist) (1929–2020), French particle physicist

== See also ==
- André Martins (disambiguation)
- Andrés de San Martín
- Andrés Martín (disambiguation)
- Andrés San Martín
- George André Martin
