= Habibu =

Habibu may refer to:

== People ==
=== First name ===
- Habibu Idris Shuaibu (born 1954), military administrator
- Habibu Kinyogoli (born 1948), Tanzanian boxer

=== Middle name ===
- Mohammad Habibu Tijani, Ghanaian politician
