= Roy Hurdley =

Panamanian boxer

Personal information
- Nationality: Panamanian

Sport
- Sport: Boxing

Roy Hurdley is a Panamanian boxer.

== Career ==
He competed in the men's lightweight event at the 1972 Summer Olympics. At the 1972 Summer Olympics, he lost in his first fight to Ivan Mikhailov of Bulgaria.
