= Ruedi Vogel =

Swiss boxer

Personal information
- Nationality: Swiss
- Born: 4 March 1947 (age 79)

Sport
- Sport: Boxing

Ruedi Vogel (born 4 March 1947) is a Swiss boxer. He competed in the men's featherweight event at the 1972 Summer Olympics. At the 1972 Summer Olympics, he defeated Joseph M'Bouroukounda of Gabon, before losing to Ryszard Tomczyk of Poland.
