= Peter Hess =

Peter Hess may refer to:

- Peter Hess (boxer) (born 1946), German boxer
- Peter Hess (landowner) (1779–1855), Canadian landowner
- Peter Hess (Swiss politician) (born 1948), Swiss politician
- Peter von Hess (1792–1871), German painter
