= Orlando Palacios =

Cuban boxer (born 1954)

Personal information
- Full name: Orlando Palacios Castillo
- Nationality: Cuban
- Born: 16 March 1954 (age 72)
- Height: 172 cm (5 ft 8 in)
Medal record
Men's boxing
Representing Cuba
Central American and Caribbean Games
Gold medal – first place	1974 Santo Domingo	Lightweight

Orlando Palacios Castillo (Note: In this Spanish name, the first or paternal surname is Palacios and the second or maternal family name is Castillo.) (born 16 March 1954) is a Cuban boxer. He competed in the men's featherweight event at the 1972 Summer Olympics. At the 1972 Summer Olympics, he defeated Joe Cofie of Ghana, before losing to Gabriel Pometcu of Romania.
