= Dale Anderson (boxer) =

Canadian boxer (1953–2019)

Personal information
- Born: 21 May 1953; Yellowknife, Northwest Territories, Canada
- Died: 2 October 2019 (aged 66)

Sport
- Sport: Boxing

Dale Anderson (21 May 1953 – 2 October 2019) was a Canadian boxer. He competed in the men's featherweight event at the 1972 Summer Olympics. At the 1972 Summer Olympics, he lost in his first fight to Clemente Rojas of Colombia.
