= Werner Ruzicka =

German boxer

Personal information
- Nationality: German
- Born: 26 December 1943 (age 81); Zuckmantel, Nazi Germany (modern-day Zlaté Hory, Czech Republic)

Sport
- Sport: Boxing

Werner Ruzicka (born 26 December 1943) is a German boxer. He competed in the men's featherweight event at the 1968 Summer Olympics. At the 1968 Summer Olympics, he lost to Nils Dag Strømme of Norway.
