= Maurice Apeang =

French boxer

Personal information
- Nationality: French
- Born: 7 September 1951 (age 74) Tahiti, French Polynesia

Sport
- Sport: Boxing

Maurice Apeang (born 7 September 1951) is a French boxer. He competed in the men's featherweight event at the 1972 Summer Olympics, where he lost to Louis Self of the United States.
