= Cufré =

Cufré is a surname. Notable people with the surname include:

- Braian Cufré (born 1996), Argentine footballer
- Julio César Cufre (born 1951), Argentine field hockey player
- Leandro Cufré (born 1978), Argentine football coach and former player
