= Seyfi Tatar =

Turkish boxer (born 1948)

Personal information
- Nationality: Turkish
- Born: 26 May 1946 Sivas, Turkey
- Died: 23 November 2015 (aged 67) Antalya, Turkey

Sport
- Sport: Boxing

Seyfi Tatar (26 May 1946 – 23 November 2015) was a Turkish boxer. He competed at the 1968 Summer Olympics and the 1972 Summer Olympics. At the 1972 Summer Olympics, he lost to Pasqualino Morbidelli of Italy in his first fight.

== Olympic results ==
=== 1968 – Mexico City ===
Below are Khallaf Allah's results in the featherweight category at the 1968 Mexico City Olympics:

Round	Opponent	Result
Round of 32	(Tunisia) Mouldi Manai	Won by decision 4–1
Round of 16	(South Korea) Kim Sung-eun	Won by decision 3–2
Quarterfinals	(Bulgaria) Ivan Mihailov	Lost by decision 2–3
