= Antonio Roldán =

Mexican boxer (born 1946)

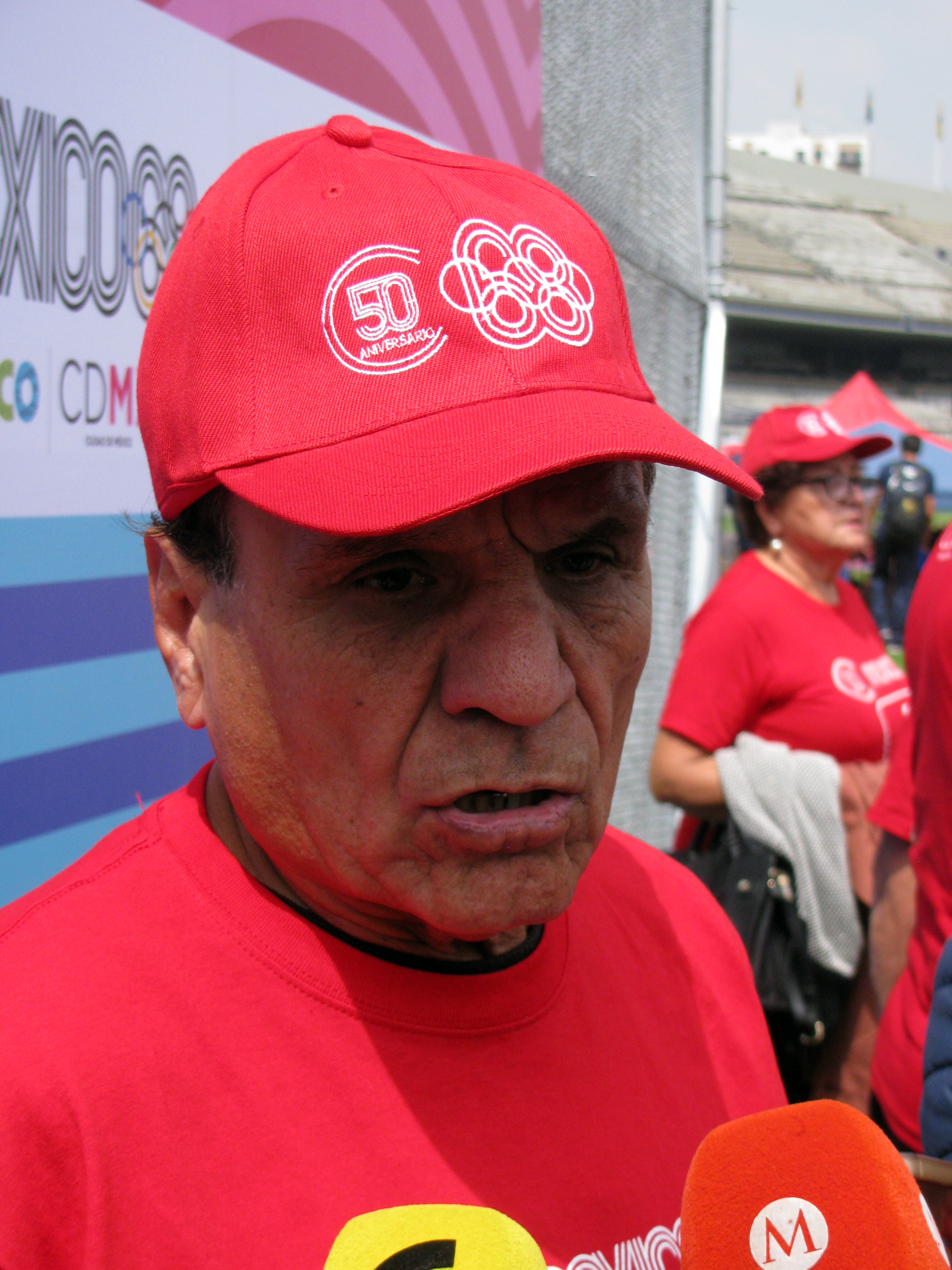
- Roldán in 2018

Personal information
- Born: Antonio Roldán Reyna; 15 June 1946 (age 80) Mexico City
- Height: 1.70 m (5 ft 7 in)

Boxing career

Boxing record
- Total fights: 6
- Wins: 3
- Win by KO: 2
- Losses: 2
- Draws: 1
Medal record
Men's amateur boxing
Representing Mexico
Olympic Games
Gold medal – first place	1968 Mexico City	Featherweight

Antonio Roldán Reyna (born 15 June 1946) is a Mexican boxer who competed in the featherweight division (– 57 kg) during his career as an amateur. He was born in Mexico City.

== Amateur career ==
Roldán was a gold medalist at the 1968 Summer Olympics in the featherweight division. In the final he won a hotly disputed bout over silver medalist Al Robinson. Robinson was dominating the fight when suddenly the referee gave Robinson a warning, and about a minute later, the referee issued a second violation which resulted in an automatic disqualification.

=== Olympic results ===
==== 1968 – Mexico City ====
Below is the record of Antonio Roldán, a Mexican featherweight boxer who competed at the 1968 Mexico City Olympics:

Round	Opponent	Result
Round of 32	(Sudan) Hwad Abdel	Won by decision 5–0
Round of 16	(Republic of Ireland) Edward Tracey	Won by decision 4–1
Quarterfinals	(Soviet Union) Valery Plotnikov	Won by decision 4–1
Semifinals	(Kenya) Philip Waruinge	Won by decision 3–2
Final	(United States) Al Robinson	Won by disqualification (won gold medal)

== Professional career ==
Roldán had a brief pro career, from 1969 to 1974, retiring after a KO loss to Ernesto Caballero having won 5 and lost 3.

== Professional boxing record ==
9 fights	5 wins	3 losses
By knockout	4	2
By decision	1	1
Draws	1	

No.	Result	Record	Opponent	Type	Round, time	Date	Location	Notes
9	Loss	5–3–1	Ernesto Caballero	TKO	2	7 May 1974	Arena Tijuana 72, Tijuana, Mexico	
8	Loss	5–2–1	Armando Muñiz	TKO	2	6 September 1973	Grand Olympic Auditorium, Los Angeles, United States	
7	Loss	5–1–1	Arturo Zuñiga	UD	10	14 December 1971	The Forum, Inglewood, United States	
6	Win	5–0–1	Víctor Zarazúa	TKO	5	September 1971	Chetumal, Mexico	
5	Win	4–0–1	José Montoya	KO	2	September 1969	Cuernavaca, Mexico	
4	Draw	3–0–1	José Ángel Zamora	PTS	10	25 July 1969	San Nicolás, Mexico	
3	Win	3–0	Francisco Valenzuela	PTS	6	23 May 1969	The Forum, Inglewood, United States	
2	Win	2–0	Joe Pacheco	TKO	2	6 May 1969	Nogales, Mexico	
1	Win	1–0	Jerry Williams	TKO	2	23 February 1969	Toreo de Cuatro Caminos, Naucalpan, Mexico	
