= Guy Segbaya =

Togolese boxer (born 1951)

Personal information
- Nationality: Togolese
- Born: 6 February 1951 (age 74)

Sport
- Sport: Boxing

Guy Segbaya (born 6 February 1951) is a Togolese boxer. He competed in the men's featherweight event at the 1972 Summer Olympics. He lost in his opening fight to Salah Mohamed Amin of Egypt.
