= Andrés Martín =

Andrés Martín may refer to:

- Andrés Martín (boxer) (born 1949), Spanish boxer
- Andrés Martín (footballer) (born 1999), Spanish footballer
- Andrés San Martín (born 1978), Argentine footballer
- Andres Martin (tennis) (born 2001), American tennis player
