= Courtney Atherly =

Guyanese boxer

Personal information
- Nationality: Guyanese
- Born: 8 February 1948 Georgetown, Guyana
- Died: 20 November 2000 (aged 52) Guyhoc Park, Guyana

Sport
- Sport: Boxing
Medal record
Men's amateur boxing
Representing Guyana
British Commonwealth Games
Bronze medal – third place	1970 Edinburgh	Bantamweight

Courtney Atherly (8 February 1948 – 20 November 2000) was a Guyanese boxer. He competed in the men's lightweight event at the 1972 Summer Olympics. At the 1972 Summer Olympics, he lost to Antonio Gin of Mexico.
