= Abdel Hady Khallaf Allah =

Egyptian boxer

Personal information
- Nationality: Egyptian
- Born: 5 March 1946; Cairo, Kingdom of Egypt
- Died: 2008 (aged 61–62)

Sport
- Sport: Boxing

Abdel Hady Khallaf Allah (5 March 1946 – 2008) was an Egyptian boxer. He competed at the 1968 Summer Olympics and the 1972 Summer Olympics. At the 1972 Summer Olympics, he lost in first fight to Hosain Eghmaz of Iran.

== Olympic results ==
=== 1968 – Mexico City ===
Below are Khallaf Allah's results in the featherweight category at the 1968 Mexico City Olympics:

Round	Opponent	Result
Round of 32	(Puerto Rico) Reinaldo Mercado	Won by decision 4–0
Round of 16	(Socialist Federal Republic of Yugoslavia) Jovan Pajković	Won by disqualification
Quarterfinals	(United States) Al Robinson	Lost by decision 0–5
