= Mario Ortiz =

Mario Ortiz may refer to:

- Mario Ortíz (sailor) (1911–?), Argentine Olympic sailor
- Mario Ortiz (Chilean footballer) (1936–2006), Chilean football midfielder
- Mario Ortíz (boxer) (1953–1978), Argentine Olympic boxer
- Mario Ortiz (Mexican footballer) (born 1983), Mexican football forward
- Mario Ortiz (Spanish footballer) (born 1989), Spanish football midfielder
- Mario Ortiz (politician) (1922–2015), Filipino politician and lawyer
