= Errol West =

Jamaican boxer (born 1947)

Personal information
- Born: 16 November 1947 (age 77); Kingston, Colony of Jamaica, British Empire

Sport
- Sport: Boxing

Errol West (born 16 November 1947) is a Jamaican boxer. He competed in the men's featherweight event at the 1968 Summer Olympics. At the 1968 Summer Olympics, he lost to Edward Tracey of Ireland.

West also represented Jamaica at the 1967 and 1971 Pan American Games.
