= Tadashi Okamoto =

Japanese boxer

Personal information
- Nationality: Japanese
- Born: 10 November 1947 (age 77); Shizuoka, Japan

Sport
- Sport: Boxing

Tadashi Okamoto (岡本 正, Okamoto Tadashi, born 10 November 1947) is a Japanese boxer. He competed in the men's featherweight event at the 1968 Summer Olympics. At the 1968 Summer Olympics, he lost to Kim Seong-eun of South Korea.
