= Jean-Paul Anton =

French boxer

Jean-Paul
Personal information
- Full name: Jean-Paul Anton
- Nationality: French
- Born: 30 April 1948 (age 76); Oran, Algeria

Sport
- Sport: Boxing

Jean-Paul Anton (born 30 April 1948) is a French boxer. He competed in the men's featherweight event at the 1968 Summer Olympics. At the 1968 Summer Olympics, he lost to Philip Waruinge of Kenya.
