= Hossein Eghmaz =

Iranian boxer (1945–2013)

Personal information
- Nationality: Iranian
- Born: 18 February 1945 Bandar-e Pahlavi, Imperial State of Iran
- Died: 17 January 2013 (aged 67) Rasht, Iran

Sport
- Sport: Boxing
Medal record
Asian Championships
| Bronze medal – third place | 1973 Bangkok | 60 kg |

Hossein Eghmaz (Persian: حسین اغماض, 18 February 1945 – 17 January 2013) is an Iranian boxer. He competed in the men's lightweight event at the 1972 Summer Olympics. At the 1972 Summer Olympics, he defeated Abdel Hady Khallaf Allah of Egypt, before losing to Ivan Mihailov of Bulgaria.
