= Peter Odhiambo =

Peter Odhiambo can refer to:

- Peter Odhiambo (boxer, born 1927), Ugandan boxer who competed at the 1960 Summer Olympics
- Peter Odhiambo (boxer, born 1950), Ugandan boxer who competed at the 1972 Summer Olympics
- Peter Odhiambo (boxer, born 1958), Ugandan boxer who competed at the 1980 Summer Olympics
- Peter Odhiambo (boxer, born 1966), Kenyan boxer who competed at the 1996 Summer Olympics
- Peter Paul Odhiambo (born 1937), Ugandan boxer who competed at the 1964 Summer Olympics
- Peter Amollo Odhiambo, Kenyan surgeon
