= Miguel García (boxer) =

Argentine boxer

Personal information
- Full name: Miguel García Aranda
- Born: 6 July 1945 Mendoza, Argentina
- Died: 11 May 2009 (aged 63) Mendoza, Argentina
- Height: 167 cm (5 ft 6 in)
- Weight: 57 kg (126 lb)

Sport
- Sport: Boxing
- Weight class: Featherweight
Medal record
Men's boxing
Representing Argentina
Pan American Games
Gold medal – first place	1967 Winnipeg	Featherweight -57 kg

Miguel García Aranda (Note: In this Spanish name, the first or paternal surname is García and the second or maternal family name is Aranda.) (6 July 1945 – 11 May 2009) was an Argentine boxer. He competed in the men's featherweight event at the 1968 Summer Olympics.

== Olympic results ==
=== 1968 – Mexico City ===
Below are García's results in the featherweight category at the 1968 Mexico City Olympics:

Round	Opponent	Result
Round of 32	(Cuba) Francisco Oduardo	Won by decision 3–2
Round of 16	(Romania) Aurel Simion	Won by decision 5–0
Quarterfinals	(Kenya) Philip Waruinge	Lost by decision 1–4
