= Guitry Bananier =

French boxer

Personal information
- Nationality: French
- Born: 11 June 1951 (age 73)

Sport
- Sport: Boxing

Guitry Bananier (born 11 June 1951) is a French boxer. He competed in the men's lightweight event at the 1972 Summer Olympics. At the 1972 Summer Olympics, he defeated Luis Davila of Puerto Rico, before losing to Kim Tae-ho of South Korea.
