= Jim Watt (boxer) =

Scottish boxer

Jim Watt MBE
Personal information
- Nationality: Scottish
- Born: James Park Watt; 18 July 1948 (age 78) Glasgow, Scotland
- Weight: Lightweight

Boxing career
- Stance: Southpaw

Boxing record
- Total fights: 46
- Wins: 38
- Win by KO: 27
- Losses: 8

Jim Watt MBE (born 18 July 1948) is a Scottish former boxer and commentator who became world champion in the lightweight division when Roberto Durán left the title vacant in 1979 and the WBC had him fight Alfredo Pitalua. Watt knocked out Pitalua in twelve rounds.

== Boxing career ==
Raised in the Bridgeton and Possilpark neighbourhoods of Glasgow, Watt trained at Cardowan Amateur Boxing Club in the city's Maryhill district. His father died when Jim was five years old. He came to prominence in 1968 by beating John H. Stracey to the ABA Championships; he turned professional immediately afterwards, declining the chance to compete as an amateur at the 1968 Summer Olympic Games in Mexico City.

Watt beat such notables as future world champion Sean O'Grady, former world champion Perico Fernandez, Charlie Nash and Howard Davis Jr. The fight with O'Grady was particularly controversial: Watt won by a knockout in round twelve when the referee stopped the fight because of a cut suffered by O'Grady. According to the book, The Ring: Boxing The 20th Century, the cut was produced by a head-butt, in which case the judges' scorecards would have been checked, and whoever was ahead given the win by a technical decision, Watt was ahead on all the scorecards. The referee, however, declared that O' Grady's cut had been produced by a punch and Watt officially won the fight by technical knockout.

Watt had also fought, and lost to, Ken Buchanan after 15 rounds in 1973. On 20 June 1981, he fought his last fight, when losing the WBC world Lightweight title to Alexis Argüello by a 15-round decision in London. The three judges' scores were 147–143, 147–143 and 147–137. Watt retired with a record of 38 wins (27 by knockout) and 8 losses (3 by knockout).

== After boxing ==
Watt was appointed Member of the Order of the British Empire (MBE) in the 1980 Birthday Honours for services to boxing. He was long-term co-commentator with Reg Gutteridge on ITV's The Big Fight Live and moved with Gutteridge to Sky Sports in 1996 when ITV withdrew from boxing coverage. During 2016, Watt announced his retirement as a boxing commentator.

Watt made a special guest appearance on the BBC's Still Game sitcom in August 2007, as well as television adverts for Kelvin Timber (a Scottish home and building supplies stores company) in the 1980s. He and his family settled in the town of Kirkintilloch to the north of Glasgow.

== Personal life ==
In June 2015, Watt's 38-year-old daughter Michelle Watt took her own life after suffering chronic headaches caused by a spinal operation. She appeared in various programmes as a television hostess, including 60 Minute Makeover. Watt's 17-year-old son James died in a car crash in 1995.

== Professional boxing record ==
46 fights	38 wins	8 losses
By knockout	27	3
By decision	11	5

No.	Result	Record	Opponent	Type	Round(s), time	Date	Age	Location	Notes
46	Loss	38–8	Alexis Argüello	UD	15	Jun 20, 1981	32 years, 337 days	Empire Pool, Wembley, London, England, U.K.	Lost WBC and The Ring lightweight titles
45	Win	38–7	Sean O'Grady	TKO	12 (15), 2:37	Nov 1, 1980	32 years, 106 days	Kelvin Hall, Glasgow, Scotland, U.K.	Retained WBC lightweight title
44	Win	37–7	Howard Davis Jr.	UD	15	Jun 7, 1980	31 years, 325 days	Ibrox Park, Glasgow, Scotland, U.K.	Retained WBC lightweight title
43	Win	36–7	Charlie Nash	TKO	4 (15), 2:10	Mar 14, 1980	31 years, 240 days	Kelvin Hall, Glasgow, Scotland, U.K.	Retained WBC lightweight title
42	Win	35–7	Robert Vasquez	TKO	9 (15)	Nov 3, 1979	31 years, 108 days	Kelvin Hall, Glasgow, Scotland, U.K.	Retained WBC lightweight title
41	Win	34–7	Alfredo Pitalua	TKO	12 (15)	Apr 17, 1979	30 years, 273 days	Kelvin Hall, Glasgow, Scotland, U.K.	Won vacant WBC lightweight title
40	Win	33–7	Antonio Guinaldo	RTD	5 (15)	Oct 18, 1978	30 years, 92 days	Kelvin Hall, Glasgow, Scotland, U.K.	Retained EBU lightweight title
39	Win	32–7	Billy Vivian	PTS	8	Jun 12, 1978	29 years, 329 days	National Sporting Club, Cafe Royal, Piccadilly, England, U.K.	
38	Win	31–7	Perico Fernández	UD	15	Feb 17, 1978	29 years, 214 days	Palacio de los Deportes, Madrid, Comunidad de Madrid, Spain	Retained EBU lightweight title
37	Win	30–7	Jeronimo Lucas	TKO	10 (15)	Nov 16, 1977	29 years, 121 days	Midland Sporting Club, Civic Hall, Solihull, West Midlands, England, U.K.	Retained EBU lightweight title
36	Win	29–7	Andre Holyk	TKO	1 (15), 1:22	Aug 5, 1977	29 years, 18 days	St. Andrew's Sporting Club, Glasgow, Scotland, U.K.	Won vacant EBU lightweight title
35	Win	28–7	Johnny Claydon	TKO	10 (15), 2:35	Feb 21, 1977	28 years, 218 days	St. Andrews SC, Albany Hotel, Glasgow, Scotland, U.K.	Retained BBBofC British lightweight title
34	Win	27–7	Franco Diana	TKO	6 (8), 2:50	Oct 12, 1976	28 years, 86 days	Empire Pool, Wembley, London, England, U.K.	
33	Loss	26–7	Johnny Claydon	TKO	3 (8), 0:20	Jun 22, 1976	27 years, 340 days	Empire Pool, Wembley, London, England, U.K.	
32	Win	26–6	Hector Diaz	TKO	4 (10), 1:25	May 10, 1976	27 years, 297 days	Hilton Hotel, Mayfair, London, England, U.K.	
31	Win	25–6	Jimmy Revie	TKO	7 (10), 0:55	Mar 30, 1976	27 years, 256 days	Cunard International Hotel, Hammersmith, London, England, U.K.	
30	Win	24–6	George Turpin	KO	4 (10), 1:55	Mar 2, 1976	27 years, 228 days	Royal Albert Hall, Kensington, London, England, U.K.	
29	Loss	23–6	Andre Holyk	PTS	12	Oct 31, 1975	27 years, 105 days	Lyon, Rhône, France	
28	Loss	23–5	Jonathan Dele	PTS	15	May 3, 1975	26 years, 289 days	National Stadium, Lagos, Nigeria	For vacant British Empire lightweight title
27	Win	23–4	Billy Waith	PTS	10	Mar 19, 1975	26 years, 244 days	Hilton Hotel, Mayfair, London, U.K.	
26	Win	22–4	John Cheshire	TKO	7 (15), 2:25	Jan 27, 1975	26 years, 193 days	St. Andrews SC, Albany Hotel, Glasgow, Scotland, U.K.	Won vacant BBBofC British lightweight title
25	Loss	21–4	Anthony Morodi	PTS	10	Oct 26, 1974	26 years, 100 days	Rand Stadium, Johannesburg, Gauteng, South Africa	
24	Win	21–3	Billy Waith	PTS	12	Jun 19, 1974	25 years, 336 days	Double Diamond Club, Caerphilly, Wales, U.K.	
23	Win	20–3	Kokkie Olivier	PTS	10	Mar 2, 1974	25 years, 227 days	Ellis Park Tennis Stadium, Johannesburg, Gauteng, South Africa	
22	Win	19–3	Andries Steyn	TKO	7 (10)	Feb 16, 1974	25 years, 213 days	Rand Stadium, Johannesburg, Gauteng, South Africa	
21	Win	18–3	Angus McMillan	PTS	8	Oct 5, 1973	25 years, 79 days	St. Andrews SC, Albany Hotel, Glasgow, Scotland, U.K.	
20	Win	17–3	Noel McIvor	TKO	4 (8)	Jun 7, 1973	24 years, 324 days	Town Hall, Govan, Scotland, U.K.	
19	Win	16–3	John Cheshire	PTS	8	May 9, 1973	24 years, 295 days	Midland Sporting Club, Civic Hall, Solihull, West Midlands, England, U.K.	
18	Loss	15–3	Ken Buchanan	PTS	15	Jan 29, 1973	24 years, 195 days	Albany Hotel, Glasgow, Scotland, U.K.	Lost BBBofC British lightweight title
17	Win	15–2	Noel McIvor	TKO	3 (10)	Dec 11, 1972	24 years, 146 days	National Sporting Club, Piccadilly, England, U.K.	
16	Win	14–2	Tony Riley	TKO	12 (15)	May 3, 1972	23 years, 290 days	Midlands Sporting Club, Solihull, West Midlands, England, U.K.	Won vacant BBBofC British lightweight title
15	Loss	13–2	Willie Reilly	TKO	10 (15)	Feb 1, 1972	23 years, 198 days	Ice Rink, Nottingham, Nottinghamshire, England, U.K.	For vacant BBBofC British lightweight title
14	Win	13–1	Leonard Tavarez	TKO	9 (10)	Nov 1, 1971	23 years, 106 days	Cafe Royal, Piccadilly, England, U.K.	
13	Win	12–1	Willie Reilly	TKO	7 (12)	Sep 27, 1971	22 years, 224 days	Empire Pool, Wembley, London, England, U.K.	
12	Win	11–1	Henri Nesi	TKO	6 (10)	Mar 22, 1971	22 years, 247 days	National Sporting Club, Piccadilly, England, U.K.	
11	Win	10–1	David Pesenti	PTS	8	Jan 11, 1971	22 years, 177 days	Great International Sporting Club, Nottingham, Nottinghamshire, U.K.	
10	Win	9–1	Ronnie Clifford	RTD	4 (8)	Dec 1, 1970	22 years, 136 days	Town Hall, Leeds, Yorkshire, U.K.	
9	Win	8–1	Sammy Lockhart	KO	2 (8)	Oct 20, 1970	22 years, 94 days	Ulster Hall, Belfast, Northern Ireland, England, U.K.	
8	Win	7–1	Bryn Lewis	TKO	6 (8)	Jun 15, 1970	21 years, 332 days	Albany Hotel, Nottingham, Nottinghamshire, England, U.K.	
7	Win	6–1	Victor Paul	TKO	5 (8)	Jun 1, 1970	21 years, 318 days	Cafe Royal, Piccadilly, England, U.K.	
6	Loss	5–1	Victor Paul	TKO	6 (8)	Feb 16, 1970	21 years, 213 days	Cafe Royal, Piccadilly, England, U.K.	
5	Win	5–0	Tommy Tiger	PTS	8	Nov 24, 1969	21 years, 129 days	National Sporting Club, Piccadilly, England, U.K.	
4	Win	4–0	Winston Thomas	TKO	4 (8), 1:00	Sep 15, 1969	21 years, 59 days	World Sporting Club, Mayfair, London, England, U.K.	
3	Win	3–0	Victor Paul	PTS	8	Apr 10, 1969	20 years, 266 days	Town Hall, Govan, Scotland, U.K.	
2	Win	2–0	Alex Gibson	TKO	2 (6), 2:05	Dec 11, 1968	20 years, 146 days	Town Hall, Hamilton, Scotland, U.K.	
1	Win	1–0	Santos Martins	KO	4 (6)	Oct 30, 1968	20 years, 104 days	Town Hall, Hamilton, Scotland, U.K.	

== See also ==
- List of British lightweight boxing champions
- List of lightweight boxing champions
- List of WBC world champions

Achievements
Vacant Title last held by Willie Reilly	British Lightweight Champion; 3 May 1972 – 29 January 1973	Succeeded by Ken Buchanan
Preceded by Roberto Durán; Vacated	WBC Lightweight Champion; 17 April 1979 – 20 June 1981	Succeeded by Alexis Argüello
Preceded by Roberto Durán; Vacated	The Ring Lightweight Champion; 12 April 1981 – 20 June 1981	Succeeded by Alexis Argüello
