= Carlos Alvarado (disambiguation) =

Carlos Alvarado (born 1980) was the President of Costa Rica from 2018 to 2022.

Carlos Alvarado may also refer to:

- Carlos Alvarado Lang (1905–1961), Mexican printmaker
- Carlos Alvarado (footballer, born 1927) (1927–2024), Costa Rican footballer
- Carlos Alberto Alvarado (born 1945), Argentine Olympic equestrian
- Carlos Alvarado (footballer, born 1949) (1949–2016), Honduran footballer
- Carlos Alvarado Reyes (1954–1988), Costa Rican cyclist
- Carlos Alvarado-Larroucau (born 1964), Argentine author

== See also ==
- Giancarlo Alvarado (born 1978), Puerto Rican baseball pitcher
- Carlos Alvarado Stadium, a stadium in Costa Rica
