= Abdou Faye (boxer) =

Senegalese boxer

Personal information
- Nationality: Senegalese

Sport
- Sport: Boxing

Abdoulaye "Abdou" Faye is a Senegalese boxer. He competed in the men's featherweight event at the 1972 Summer Olympics. At the 1972 Summer Olympics, he lost to Michael Andrews of Nigeria. He was the subject of the 1962 French film The Winner (Un cœur gros comme ça).

== See also ==
- The Winner
