= Kuncho Kunchev (boxer) =

Bulgarian boxer

Personal information
- Nationality: Bulgarian
- Born: 1 December 1951 (age 73); Plovdiv, Bulgaria

Sport
- Sport: Boxing

Kuncho Kunchev (born 1 December 1951) is a Bulgarian boxer. He competed in the men's featherweight event at the 1972 Summer Olympics.
