= Palamdorjiin Bayar =

Mongolian boxer (born 1941)

Personal information
- Nationality: Mongolian
- Born: 25 May 1941 (age 85)
- Height: 164 cm (5 ft 5 in)
- Weight: 57 kg (126 lb)

Boxing career
- Weight class: Featherweight

Palamdorjiin Bayar (Паламдоржийн Баяр, born 25 May 1941) is a Mongolian boxer. He competed in the men's featherweight event at the 1972 Summer Olympics.
