= Jan Wadas =

Polish boxer (born 1944)

Personal information
- Nationality: Polish
- Born: 16 May 1944 (age 81); Lubcza, Poland

Sport
- Sport: Boxing

Jan Wadas (born 16 May 1944) is a Polish boxer. He competed in the men's featherweight event at the 1968 Summer Olympics. At the 1968 Summer Olympics, he lost to Ivan Mihailov of Bulgaria. At the 1968 Summer Olympics, he lost to Ivan Mihailov of Bulgaria.
