= Joe Gibilisco =

Italian boxer

Personal information
- Nationality: Italian
- Born: Giuseppe Gibilisco; 1 May 1954 (age 72) Solarino, Italy
- Height: 5 ft 4 in (163 cm)
- Weight: Lightweight; Light-welterweight

Boxing career
- Stance: Orthodox

Boxing record
- Total fights: 35
- Wins: 25
- Win by KO: 16
- Losses: 6
- Draws: 4

Giuseppe "Joe" Gibilisco (born 1 May 1954) is an Italian former professional boxer who held the European lightweight title from 1981 to 1983.

== Career ==
After emigrating with his family, he began his professional career in Australia with initially favorable results and then with ups and downs. On 7 October 1977 Gibilisco challenged Billy Mullholland for the Australian lightweight title, losing via points decision over fifteen rounds.

He returned to Italy in the spring of 1978, managed by Umberto Branchini, and obtaining nine victories and only one draw, against Lucio Cusma, on 11 July 1979, in Rimini.

On 10 May 1981, he defeated Charlie Nash in Dublin via sixth-round knockout (KO) to capture the European lightweight title.

He successfully defended his European title against Jose Luis Heredia, scoring a ninth-round KO on 21 October in Taormina. His second defence came against Ray Cattouse on 24 February 1982, resulting in a draw after twelve rounds. In his third defence he scored a fourth-round KO victory against José Antonio Garcia.

In Gibilisco's final fight, he lost his title against Lucio Cusma via corner retirement in the eleventh round on 17 March 1983 in Capo d 'Orlando.
