= Pasqualino Morbidelli =

Italian boxer (1948–2020)

Personal information
- Nationality: Italian
- Born: 1 November 1948 Rome, Italy
- Died: 21 March 2020 (aged 71) Rome

Sport
- Sport: Boxing

Pasqualino Morbidelli (1 November 1948 – 21 March 2020) was an Italian boxer. He competed in the men's featherweight event at the 1972 Summer Olympics. At the 1972 Summer Olympics, he defeated Morgan Mwenya and Seyfi Tatar, before losing to Royal Kobayashi.
