= Gennady Dobrokhotov =

Soviet boxer (1948–2025)

Personal information
- Nationality: Soviet
- Born: 24 September 1948; Brzeg, Poland
- Died: 8 February 2025 (aged 76)

Sport
- Sport: Boxing

Gennady Dobrokhotov (24 September 1948 – 8 February 2025) was a Soviet boxer. He competed in the men's lightweight event at the 1972 Summer Olympics. Dobrokhotov died on 8 February 2025, at the age of 76.
