= Al Robinson =

American boxer

Personal information
- Full name: Albert Robinson
- Born: June 18, 1947 Paris, Texas, U.S.
- Died: January 24, 1974 (aged 26) Oakland, California, U.S.
- Height: 71 in (180 cm)
- Weight: 126 lb (57 kg)

Sport
- Sport: Boxing
- Weight class: Featherweight
Medal record
Men's boxing
Representing the United States
Olympic Games
Silver medal – second place	1968 Mexico City	Featherweight -57 kg
Pan American Games
Bronze medal – third place	1967 Winnipeg	Featherweight -57 kg

Albert Robinson (June 18, 1947 – January 24, 1974) was a boxer from Oakland, California who competed in the featherweight division (– 57 kg) during his career.

== Amateur career ==
Robinson was the featherweight (125 pounds) silver medalist in the 1968 Olympic Games in Mexico City. In the final Robinson lost a highly disputed bout to Antonio Roldan of Mexico. Robinson was dominating the fight when suddenly the referee gave Robinson a warning. About a minute later, the referee issued a second violation for an alleged butt that opened up a bloody gash on Roldan's head. This resulted in Robinson's automatic disqualification.

== Olympic results ==
=== 1968 – Mexico City ===
Below are the results of Al Robinson, a featherweight boxer who represented the United States at the 1968 Mexico City Olympics:

Round	Opponent	Result
Round of 32	(United Kingdom) John Cheshire	Won by referee stopped contest
Round of 16	(Philippines) Teogenes Pelegrino	Won by knockout in the second round
Quarterfinals	(United Arab Republic) Abdel Hady Khallaf Allah	Won by decision 5–0
Semifinals	(Bulgaria) Ivan Mihailov	Won by decision 4–2
Final	(Mexico) Antonio Roldán	Lost by disqualification (won silver medal)

== Pro career ==
Robinson turned pro in 1969 and won his first six bouts before being KO'd by journeyman Fermin Soto. He recovered after the loss to win his next six bouts.

== Death ==
On April 30, 1971, Robinson lapsed into a coma, after complaining that he was feeling ill after a workout at the New Oakland Boxing Club. Robinson never came out of the coma, and died on January 24, 1974.
