= Joe Cofie =

Ghanaian boxer

Personal information
- Nationality: Ghanaian
- Born: 1 January 1946 (age 79)

Sport
- Sport: Boxing

Joe Cofie (born 1 January 1946) is a Ghanaian boxer. He competed in the men's featherweight event at the 1972 Summer Olympics. At the 1972 Summer Olympics, he lost in his first fight to Orlando Palacios of Cuba.
