= André Martins =

André Martins may refer to:

- André Martins (footballer, born 1990), Portuguese central midfielder
- André Martins (footballer, born 1989), Portuguese goalkeeper
- André Martins (footballer, born 1987), Portuguese forward

== See also ==
- André Martin (disambiguation)
