= Elio Cotena =

Italian boxer (1945–2026)

Personal information
- Nationality: Italian
- Born: 30 August 1945 Naples, Italy
- Died: 30 June 2026 (aged 80) Naples, Italy

Sport
- Sport: Boxing

Elio Cotena (30 August 1945 – 30 June 2026) was an Italian boxer. He competed in the men's featherweight event at the 1968 Summer Olympics. At the 1968 Summer Olympics, he defeated Carl-Axel Palm of Sweden, before losing to Valery Plotnikov of the Soviet Union.

== Early life ==
Cotena spent his childhood as a true Neapolitan street urchin. He grew up in Mergellina playing in the street with the future football coach Gianni Di Marzio and the footballer Giuseppe Massa. Cotena got married at age 17.

== Amateur career ==
At fourteen, Cotena began practicing boxing in a gym in the Neapolitan district of San Lorenzo. He fought at featherweight. He was soon inspired by Muhammad Ali, adopting the tactic of suddenly striking the opponent and then getting out of reach, avoiding his reaction.

Cotena was silver medalist at the 1965 Italian championships in Cagliari, Italian champion in 1966 in Genoa and in 1967 in Naples. The same year he won the gold medal at the V Mediterranean Games in Algiers. He was part of the unfortunate Italian expedition to the Games of the XIX Olympiad in Mexico City in 1968. Cotena was one of the 5 out of 11 Italian boxers who lost in the preliminaries with a verdict of 3-2, often discussed. He was eliminated in the round of 16 by the Soviet Valery Plotnikov, in a fight that was uncertain until the end. In his case, the negative verdict came from a judge who had given the preference for the Soviet. He turned professional immediately after the Olympics, in the stable of Rocco Agostino.

== Professional career ==
After 16 fights all won, Cotena won the Italian featherweight title, beating Augusto Civardi on points, in Piacenza, on January 30, 1971. In the rematch also set up in Piacenza, however, Civardi knocked him out in the third round, inflicting his first defeat and taking back the national championship belt On May 12, 1972, Cotena's career crossed paths with that of the Sicilian Giovanni Girgenti who, in the meantime, had snatched the title from Civardi. Cotena, defeated him on points, regaining the Italian title. Also in the rematch, set up in Genoa on 29 November 1972, the new Italian champion prevailed on points. Between the two matches, a draw with Nevio Carbi from Trieste, on 26 August of the same year, in Lignano Sabbiadoro, allowed him to retain the belt He defended the title victoriously four more times, with Enzo Farinelli, Bruno Pieracci (twice) and Ambrogio Mariani. On April 17, 1974, Cotena fought for the first time for the European title, in Zaragoza, against the Spaniard José Antonio Jiménez. At the third round Cotena was counted. Recovered, he began to lead the match, so much so that in the twelfth round he was clearly ahead. In the following rounds the holder began to become more aggressive, having understood that his belt was in danger, even with some action at the limit of the regulation. In the last round he sent the challenger to the ground with an elbow, followed by a push. Cotena hit his head on the mat and was unable to get up. The verdict, rather than the disqualification of the Spaniard, was KO. The Italian Boxing Federation sent a formal protest to the EBU and obtained the preparation of the rematch. This time the match was fought in Naples, in front of the public of Cotena, February 12, 1975. The Italian won by knockout in the eleventh round, finally winning the European belt Cotena successfully defended the title four times. On April 30, 1975 he beat Rodolfo Sanchez in Naples on points. On 22 October 1975 in Cefalù he faced Michel Lefevbre, with a KO in the twelfth round. On 25 February 1976 he met the Scotsman Vernon Sollas in London. Cotena got off to a good start but then the Scot recovered and then went to the 14th round. The Neapolitan won by knockout in the fourteenth round and bought an apartment with the bag of the fight. On 26 May he went to fight in Trieste, in the "lair" of Nevio Carbi who, now thirty-five years old, was KO'ed in the twelfth round. He lost the European title in Madrid, on December 3, 1976, to Pedro Niño Jimenez by knockout in the twelfth round. He then tried to climb to the European super featherweight title but was defeated on 8 May 1978 in Brescia by Natale Vezzoli. He ended his competitive career on 21 July 1978 in Ischia against the Frenchman Charles Jurietti. In the second round, he fractured his jaw but continued to fight and won on points in ten rounds

== After retirement ==
The early days, after retiring, were not easy for Cotena who dedicated himself to selling plastic bags to shops in Naples. Then he became an entrepreneur in the sector, with the exclusivity of the products of some companies. He also opened an office in New York. In 1979 he made his debut as an organizer of boxing matches and then became the agent of champions such as Patrizio Oliva, Sumbu Kalambay, Gianfranco Rosi, Giovanni Parisi and many others. He organized more than 1700 fights. With the collaboration of Franco Esposito he also published his autobiography, entitled A Life of Dreams and Fists. From street urchin to champion in the name of Muhammad Ali, for the publisher Tullio Pironti.

Cotena died in Naples on 30 June 2026, at the age of 80.
