= Soth Sun =

Cambodian boxer

Personal information
- Nationality: Cambodian
- Born: 1 January 1946 (age 79)

Sport
- Sport: Boxing

Soth Sun (born 1 January 1946) is a Cambodian boxer. He competed in the men's featherweight event at the 1972 Summer Olympics.
