= Teogenes Pelegrino =

Filipino boxer

Personal information
- Nationality: Filipino
- Born: January 3, 1949 (age 77) Bohol, Philippines
- Height: 5 ft 4 in (163 cm)
- Weight: 126 lb (57 kg)

Sport
- Sport: Boxing
- Weight class: Featherweight

Teogenes Pelegrino (born January 3, 1949) is a Filipino amateur boxer born in Bohol. He competed in the men's featherweight event at the 1968 Summer Olympics where he was the only competitor who managed to win a match among five Filipino boxers competing that iteration of the games. At the 1968 Summer Olympics, he defeated Fantahun Seifu of Ethiopia, before losing to Al Robinson of the United States.
