= Juan Francisco García (boxer) =

Mexican boxer (1953–2023)

Personal information
- Nationality: Mexican
- Born: 28 March 1953
- Died: 8 January 2023 (aged 69) Mexico City, Mexico

Sport
- Sport: Boxing
Medal record
Men's amateur boxing
Representing Mexico
Pan American Games
Gold medal – first place	1971 Cali	Featherweight

Juan Francisco García (28 March 1953 – 8 January 2023) was a Mexican boxer. He competed in the men's featherweight event at the 1972 Summer Olympics.

García died in Mexico City on 8 January 2023, at the age of 69.
