= Charlie Nash (boxer) =

Irish boxer (born 1951)

Personal information
- Nationality: Irish
- Born: Charles Nash; 10 May 1951 (age 75) Derry, Northern Ireland, United Kingdom
- Weight: Lightweight

Boxing career
- Stance: Southpaw

Boxing record
- Total fights: 30
- Wins: 25
- Win by KO: 9
- Losses: 5
- Draws: 0
- No contests: 0

Charlie Nash (born 1951 in Derry, Northern Ireland), is a retired Irish boxer. As just an amateur, he held an Irish national title and represented Ireland in the 1972 Olympic Games. As a professional, he won the professional British and then European lightweight titles but lost to Jim Watt, when he challenged him for the World Boxing Council title. He has given several interviews about having to check several bodies laid out in a hospital morgue in order to identify that of his brother William, who was killed during the Bloody Sunday massacre.

== Amateur career ==
Nash was a member of his local St. Mary's boxing club, and won the junior championships at provincial level. After winning the senior title in Ulster in 1969 Nash then won the Irish National Senior Title in 1970.

He was travelling back from a fight in Dublin where he represented St Mary's at the time his younger brother, Willie, was shot dead and their father, Alex, was shot and wounded during the Bloody Sunday massacre.

Eight months later, Nash was part of the Irish Olympic Team for the 1972 Summer Olympics in Munich, Germany. Nash fought well at the 1972 Olympics but was knocked out of the competition in a quarterfinal by the eventual winner, Jan Szczpanski of Poland.

=== 1972 Olympic results ===
Below are the results of Charlie Nash in the lightweight division at the 1972 Munich Olympics:

- Round of 64: bye
- Round of 32: Defeated Erik Madsen (Denmark) by decision, 5–0
- Round of 16: Defeated Antonio Gin (Mexico) by first-round technical knockout
- Quarterfinal: Lost to Jan Szczepański (Poland) by a third-round technical knockout

== Pro career ==
In 1975 Nash was faced with the choice to keep on fighting as an amateur or turn professional and decided to become a professional boxer in order to provide a living for himself.

Nash won the British and then European lightweight titles by fights arranged in the wake of abandoned vacant titles. The titles were left vacant by Jim Watt, whom many saw as running scared of Nash. It wasn't until 1980 that Nash finally got the chance to fight Watt – this time for the World Boxing Council lightweight title. The death of his manager Jack Solomon very close to the bout almost caused the fight to be called off. However, Nash found a new manager in Mickey Duff. This enabled the match to go ahead. Nash lost the match, and was bitterly disappointed.

=== Title defences ===
Later that year he successfully defended his European Title against Francesco Leon. This gave Nash a chance to answer his critics after the defeat to Watt earlier that year, but he then lost his next defence to Giuseppe Gibilisco after being knocked out in the 6th round.

Nash fought four more times, retiring in 1983 after being stopped in 5 rounds by Rene Weller in Germany. He remained in the Derry area and stayed involved with the sport at Derry's Ring Boxing Club.

== See also ==
- List of British lightweight boxing champions
