= Luis Davila (boxer) =

Puerto Rican boxer (born 1954)

Luis Dávila
Personal information
- Nationality: Puerto Rican
- Born: 24 April 1954 (age 72)
- Height: 168 cm (5 ft 6 in)
- Weight: 60 kg (132 lb)

Sport
- Sport: Boxing
Medal record
Men's Boxing
Representing Puerto Rico
Pan American Games
Gold medal – first place	1971 Cali	Lightweight

Luis Dávila (born 24 April 1954) is a Puerto Rican boxer. He competed in the men's lightweight event at the 1972 Summer Olympics. At the 1972 Summer Olympics, he lost to Guitry Bananier of France.
