= Billy Taylor (boxer) =

British boxer (1952–2022)

Personal information
- Full name: William Taylor
- Nationality: British
- Born: 14 September 1952
- Died: 19 January 2022 (aged 69)

Sport
- Sport: Boxing

William Taylor (14 September 1952 – 19 January 2022) was a British boxer. He competed in the men's featherweight event at the 1972 Summer Olympics. At the 1972 Summer Olympics, he defeated Lahcen Maghfour of Morocco, before losing to Jochen Bachfeld of East Germany. Taylor died on 19 January 2022, at the age of 69.
