= Francisco Oduardo =

Cuban boxer (born 1949)

Personal information
- Full name: Francisco Oduardo Lugo
- Born: 3 December 1949 (age 76) Havana, Cuba
- Height: 172 cm (5 ft 8 in)
- Weight: 57 kg (126 lb)

Sport
- Sport: Boxing
- Weight class: Featherweight, Lightweight
Medal record
Men's boxing
Representing Argentina
Pan American Games
Silver medal – second place	1967 Winnipeg	Featherweight -57 kg
Central American and Caribbean Games
Gold medal – first place	1970 Panama	Lightweight -60 kg

Francisco Oduardo Lugo (Note: In this Spanish name, the first or paternal surname is Oduardo and the second or maternal family name is Lugo.) (born 3 December 1949) is a Cuban boxer. He competed in the men's featherweight event at the 1968 Summer Olympics. At the 1968 Summer Olympics in Mexico City, he lost his first bout by a 2-3 decision to Miguel García of Argentina.
