= Aurel Simion =

Romanian boxer

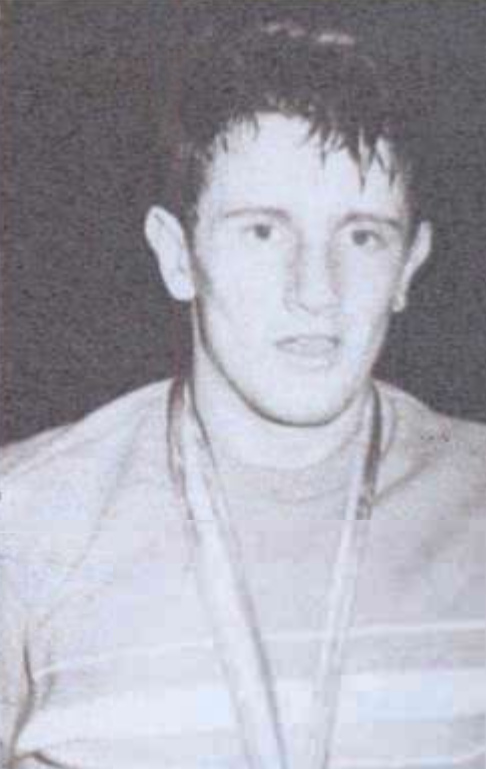
- Simion in 1968

Personal information
- Nationality: Romanian
- Born: 7 April 1946 Câmpulung, Romania
- Died: 26 August 2020 (aged 74)

Sport
- Sport: Boxing

Aurel Simion (7 April 1946 – 26 August 2020) was a Romanian boxer. He competed in the men's featherweight event at the 1968 Summer Olympics. At the 1968 Summer Olympics, he defeated Mario Santamaria of Nicaragua, before losing to Miguel García of Argentina.
