= Mario Santamaria =

Nicaraguan boxer

Personal information
- Born: 30 September 1950 Mina Limón, Nicaragua
- Died: April 1974 (aged 23)

Sport
- Sport: Boxing

Mario Santamaria (30 September 1950 – April 1974) was a Nicaraguan boxer. He competed in the men's featherweight event at the 1968 Summer Olympics. At the 1968 Summer Olympics, he lost to Aurel Simion of Romania.
