= Preecha Nopparat =

Thai boxer

Personal information
- Nationality: Thai
- Born: 21 September 1948 (age 76)

Sport
- Sport: Boxing

Preecha Nopparat (born 21 September 1948) is a Thai boxer. He competed in the men's featherweight event at the 1972 Summer Olympics. At the 1972 Summer Olympics, he lost to Andras Botos of Hungary in the Round of 64.
