= Sven Erik Paulsen =

Norwegian boxer

Personal information
- Nationality: Norwegian
- Born: 30 March 1946 (age 78); Trondheim, Norway

Sport
- Sport: Boxing

Sven Erik Paulsen (born 30 March 1946) is a Norwegian boxer. He competed in the men's lightweight event at the 1972 Summer Olympics.
