= Boxing at the 1971 Pan American Games =

The Men's Boxing Tournament at the 1971 Pan American Games was held in Cali, Colombia, from July 25 to August 6. The light flyweight division (– 48 kilograms) was included for the first time.

== Medal winners ==
Event	Gold	Silver	Bronze
Light Flyweight (– 48 kilograms)	Rafael Carbonell; Cuba	Héctor Velasquez; Chile	Salvador García; Mexico Juan Carlos Rios; Argentina
Flyweight (– 51 kilograms)	Francisco Rodríguez; Venezuela	Arturo Delgado; Mexico	Douglas Rodríguez; Cuba Bobby Hunter; United States
Bantamweight (– 54 kilograms)	Pedro Flores; Mexico	Calixto Pérez; Colombia	Roger Buchely; Ecuador Ricardo Carreras; United States
Featherweight (– 57 kilograms)	Juan Francisco García; Mexico	José Baptista; Venezuela	Manuel Torres; Cuba Enrique Alonso; Panama
Lightweight (– 60 kilograms)	Luis Davila; Puerto Rico	Alfonso Pérez; Colombia	Marco Juardo; Ecuador James Busceme; United States
Light Welterweight (– 63.5 kilograms)	Enrique Regüeiferos; Cuba	José Vasquez; Colombia	Wiley Johnson; United States Reginald Forde; Guyana
Welterweight (– 67 kilograms)	Emilio Correa; Cuba	Larry Carlisle; United States	Jovito Díaz; Venezuela Sergio Lozano; Mexico
Light Middleweight (– 71 kilograms)	Rolando Garbey; Cuba	Emeterio Villanueva; Mexico	Bernard Guindon; Canada Reggie Jones; United States
Middleweight (– 75 kilograms)	Faustino Quinales; Venezuela	Jerry Otis; United States	Agustin Zaragoza; Mexico Carlos Franco; Uruguay
Light Heavyweight (– 81 kilograms)	Raymond Russell; United States	Waldemar de Oliveira; Brazil	William Titley; Canada Humberto Salguero; Argentina
Heavyweight (+ 81 kilograms)	Duane Bobick; United States	Joaquín Rocha; Mexico	Teófilo Stevenson; Cuba Vicente de Campo; Brazil

== Medal table ==
Rank	Nation	Gold	Silver	Bronze	Total
1	Cuba	4	0	3	7
2	Mexico	2	3	3	8
3	United States	2	2	5	9
4	Venezuela	2	1	1	4
5	Puerto Rico	1	0	0	1
6	Colombia	0	3	0	3
7	Brazil	0	1	1	2
8	Chile	0	1	0	1
9	Argentina	0	0	2	2
9	Canada	0	0	2	2
9	Ecuador	0	0	2	2
12	Guyana	0	0	1	1
12	Panama	0	0	1	1
12	Uruguay	0	0	1	1
Totals (14 entries)		11	11	22	44
