= Fantahun Seifu =

Ethiopian boxer (born 1948)

Personal information
- Nationality: Ethiopian
- Born: 20 February 1948 (age 77); Shenkora, Ethiopia

Sport
- Sport: Boxing

Fantahun Seifu (born 20 February 1948) is an Ethiopian boxer. He competed in the men's featherweight event at the 1968 Summer Olympics. At the 1968 Summer Olympics he lost to Teogenes Pelegrino of the Philippines.
