= Risto Meronen =

Finnish boxer

Personal information
- Nationality: Finnish
- Born: 17 August 1945 (age 79); Vantaa, Finland

Sport
- Sport: Boxing

Risto Meronen (born 17 August 1945) is a Finnish boxer. He competed in the men's featherweight event at the 1968 Summer Olympics. At the 1968 Summer Olympics, he lost to Valery Plotnikov of the Soviet Union.
