= José Baptista =

Venezuelan boxer (born 1947)

Personal information
- Nationality: Venezuelan
- Born: 27 February 1947 (age 79)

Sport
- Sport: Boxing
Medal record
Men's amateur boxing
Representing Venezuela
Pan American Games
Silver medal – second place	1971 Cali	Featherweight

José Baptista (born 27 February 1947) is a Venezuelan boxer. He competed in the men's featherweight event at the 1972 Summer Olympics.
