= Karel Kašpar (boxer) =

Czechoslovak boxer

Personal information
- Nationality: Czechoslovak
- Born: 6 April 1952 (age 72)

Sport
- Sport: Boxing

Karel Kašpar (born 6 April 1952) is a Czechoslovak boxer. He competed in the men's lightweight event at the 1972 Summer Olympics.
