= Angelos Theotokatos =

Greek boxer (born 1939)

Personal information
- Nationality: Greek
- Born: 10 October 1939 (age 85); Rifi, Greece

Sport
- Sport: Boxing

Angelos Theotokatos (born 10 October 1939) is a Greek boxer. He competed at the 1968 Summer Olympics and the 1972 Summer Olympics. At the 1972 Summer Olympics, he defeated Lema Yemane of Ethiopia, before losing to Louis Self of the United States.
