= Jose Martinez (boxer) =

Canadian boxer (born 1951)

Personal information
- Born: 10 April 1951 (age 74) Montreal, Quebec, Canada

Sport
- Sport: Boxing

Jose Martinez (born 10 April 1951) is a Canadian boxer. He competed in the men's lightweight event at the 1972 Summer Olympics. At the 1972 Summer Olympics, he lost to Giambattista Capretti of Italy.
