= Harouna Lago =

Nigerien boxer (born 1946)

Harouna Lago (born 1946) is a former Nigerien featherweight boxer. Lago competed at the 1972 Summer Olympics for Niger. He lost his only match to eventual gold medal winner Boris Kuznetsov of the Soviet Union.

== 1972 Olympic results ==
Below is the record of Harouna Lago, a Nigerien featherweight boxer who competed at the 1972 Munich Olympics:

- Round of 64: lost to Boris Kuznetsov (Soviet Union) by a first-round knockout
