= Willie Reilly =

Scottish boxer

Personal information
- Nationality: British
- Born: 25 March 1947 (age 79) Glasgow, Scotland
- Weight: Featherweight, lightweight

Boxing career

Boxing record
- Total fights: 23
- Wins: 13
- Win by KO: 5
- Losses: 7
- Draws: 3

Willie Reilly (born 25 March 1947) is a British former boxer who was British lightweight champion in 1972.

== Career ==
Born in Glasgow, Reilly made his professional debut in October 1968. In February 1971 he drew with former European lightweight champion Borge Krogh in Copenhagen and the following month lost to Canadian champion Al Ford in Edmonton. In April that year he stopped defending holder Brian Hudson to take the BBBofC Southern Area title, leading to a British title eliminator against Jim Watt in September. Watt won that fight via a seventh round stoppage to earn the right to challenge for Ken Buchanan's British title.

After Buchanan relinquished the title, Watt faced Reilly in February 1972 at the Nottingham Ice Rink for the vacant title. Reilly opened a cut over Watt's right eyebrow in the seventh round and after the cut worsened the fight was stopped in the tenth, leaving Reilly the new British champion.

Reilly's final fight was in March 1972, beating Herbie McLean on points at the Kelvin Hall in Glasgow.
