= Joseph M'Bouroukounda =

Gabonese boxer (1938–2017)

Personal information
- Nationality: Gabonese
- Born: 7 September 1938 Fernand-Vaz, French Equatorial Africa
- Died: 25 September 2017 (aged 79) Libreville, Gabon

Sport
- Sport: Boxing
Medal record
Men's boxing
Representing Gabon
All-Africa Games
Bronze medal – third place	1965 Brazzaville	Featherweight

Joseph M'Bouroukounda (7 September 1938 – 25 September 2017) was a Gabonese boxer. He competed for Gabon at the 1972 Summer Olympics in the men's featherweight event, becoming the first Gabonese Olympian. He was also a bronze medalist at the 1965 All-Africa Games. After his competitive career, he served as a coach.

== Biography ==
Joseph "Joe" M'Bouroukounda was born on 7 September 1938 to an ethnic Shira Christian family in the village of Fernand-Vaz, French Equatorial Africa (in present-day Ogooué-Maritime Province). At age eight, he was frequently bullied by his classmates at the Fernand-Vaz primary school, in part because he only spoke the Gisir language, not French. In hopes of being respected, he decided to increase his size and gain more strength by lifting weights. M'Bouroukounda also began practicing combat sports, enjoying boxing, and he eventually earned the respect of his "adversaries" in school.

M'Bouroukounda received a Certificat d'Études Primaires et Élémentaire (Certificate of Primary and Elementary Studies, CEPE) from a Catholic school in Port-Gentil in 1953. He then moved to Brazzaville in his late teens for his studies, enrolling at the School of Fine Arts. He studied there for three years before graduating and moving to Libreville, where he became a visual arts teacher and continued to box. In 1960, he competed at a tournament in Antananarivo, Madagascar, before several high-ranking African government officials and won, impressing Gabonese Prime Minister Léon M'ba. After this tournament, he set a goal of competing at the 1965 All-Africa Games, training more regularly at the Libreville boxing club. He eventually qualified for the Games and won the bronze medal in the featherweight event, defeating a Congolese competitor named Kimbémbé for the medal. Gabonese media website Info241 later described this achievement as an "unexpected miracle at a time when Gabon still had few, if any, high-quality professional boxing facilities".

With the support of Léon M'ba, M'Bouroukounda was sent to France to continue his art studies and refine his boxing skills. He won regional boxing titles near Paris as a member of the Marcel Cerdan Club but later moved back to Gabon in 1967. A few years later, he was selected to compete for Gabon at the 1972 Summer Olympics in Munich, becoming the country's first-ever Olympian. In the first round of the men's featherweight event on 27 August, he was defeated by Ruedi Vogel of Switzerland. He was celebrated upon his return home by fans, but received no attention from the government, which had, after M'ba's death, prioritized infrastructure and politics over sport. Disliking the government's lack of support for sports, he retired from boxing soon after but remained active in the sport as a coach, establishing his own club. He was a coach for the national team and also served as the president of the Gabonese Boxing Federation from 1975 to 1978 and in 1985. Outside of sport, he worked as an art teacher in Libreville until his retirement.

M'Bouroukounda was married and had 17 children. His grand-nephew, Yannick Mitoumba, represented Gabon at the 2012 Summer Olympics in London. In his last years, M'Bouroukounda suffered from paralysis, went blind, and his memory deteriorated. He died in Libreville on 25 September 2017, at the age of 79. After his death, he was described in the Gabon Review as "the greatest Gabonese boxer of all time".
