= Peter Prause =

German boxer

Personal information
- Nationality: German
- Born: 17 March 1943 (age 82); Berlin, Germany

Sport
- Sport: Boxing

Peter Prause (born 17 March 1943) is a German boxer. He competed in the men's featherweight event at the 1972 Summer Olympics. At the 1972 Summer Olympics, he lost to Jochen Bachfeld of East Germany.
