= Carl-Axel Palm =

Swedish boxer

Personal information
- Nationality: Swedish
- Born: 20 September 1949 (age 75); Stockholm, Sweden

Sport
- Sport: Boxing

Carl-Axel Palm (born 20 September 1949) is a Swedish boxer. He competed in the men's featherweight event at the 1968 Summer Olympics. At the 1968 Summer Olympics, he lost to Elio Cotena of Italy.
