= Valery Plotnikov (boxer) =

Russian boxer

Personal information
- Nationality: Russian
- Born: 5 May 1950 (age 74); Dzerzhinsk, Russian SFSR, Soviet Union

Sport
- Sport: Boxing

Valery Plotnikov (born 5 May 1950) is a Russian boxer. He competed in the men's featherweight event at the 1968 Summer Olympics.

== Olympic results ==
=== 1968 – Mexico City ===
Below are Plotnikov's results in the featherweight category at the 1968 Mexico City Olympics:

Round	Opponent	Result
Round of 32	(Finland) Risto Meronen	Won by decision 5–0
Round of 16	(Italy) Elio Cotena	Won by decision 3–2
Quarterfinals	(Mexico) Antonio Roldán	Lost by decision 1–4
