= Edward Tracey =

Irish boxer (born 1943)

Personal information
- Nationality: Irish
- Born: 5 June 1943 (age 83) Dublin, Ireland

Sport
- Sport: Boxing

Edward Tracey (born 5 June 1943) is an Irish boxer. He competed in the men's featherweight event at the 1968 Summer Olympics. At the 1968 Summer Olympics, he defeated Errol West of Jamaica, before losing to Antonio Roldán of Mexico.
