= Jan Szczepański (boxer) =

Polish boxer

Olympic medal record

Men's Boxing

Representing Poland
Gold medal – first place	1972 Munich	Lightweight

European Amateur Championships
Gold medal – first place	1971 Madrid	Lightweight

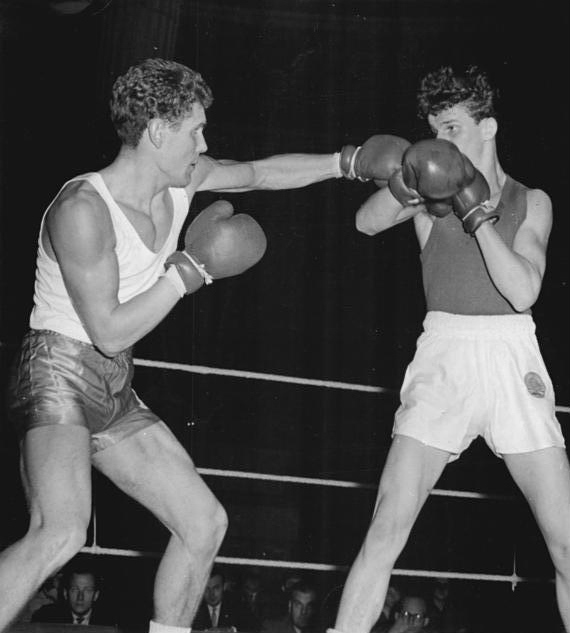
Jan Szczepański (left)

Jan Antoni Szczepański (20 November 1939 in Małecz – 15 January 2017 in Warsaw) was a Polish boxer, who won the gold medal in the lightweight division (– 60 kg) at the 1972 Summer Olympics in Munich, West Germany. In the final he defeated Hungary's László Orbán on points (5:0).

Szczepański died on 15 January 2017, after a long illness.

== Olympic results ==
- 1st round bye
- Defeated Kasamiro Kashri Marchlo (Sudan) 5-0
- Defeated James Busceme (United States) 5-0
- Defeated Charlie Nash (Ireland) RSC 3
- Defeated Samuel Mbugua (Kenya) walk-over
- Defeated László Orbán (Hungary) 5-0
