= Clemente Rojas =

Colombian boxer (born 1952)

Olympic medal record

Representing Colombia

Men's amateur boxing

Olympic Games
Bronze medal – third place	1972 Munich	Featherweight

Clemente Rojas (born September 1, 1952, in Cartagena) is a retired boxer from Colombia, who won the bronze medal in the men's featherweight division (– 57 kilograms) at the 1972 Summer Olympics. He turned pro on September 29, 1974, and retired in 1983, after 25 bouts (nine wins, thirteen losses and three draws).

== 1972 Olympic results ==
Below is the record of Clemente Rojas, a Colombian featherweight boxer who competed at the 1972 Munich Olympics:

- Round of 64: bye
- Round of 32: defeated Dale Anderson (Canada) by decision, 3–2
- Round of 16: defeated Kuncho Kunchev (Bulgaria) by walkover
- Quarterfinal: defeated Antonio Rubio (Spain) by disqualification in the second round
- Semifinal: lost to Philip Waruinge (Kenya) by decision, 2-3 (was awarded bronze medal)
