= John Cheshire (boxer) =

British boxer

Personal information
- Nationality: British (Scottish)
- Born: 11 September 1947 (age 77); Ayr, Scotland

Sport
- Sport: Boxing

John William Cheshire (born 11 September 1947) is a British boxer. He fought as Johnny Cheshire and competed in the men's featherweight event at the 1968 Summer Olympics. At the 1968 Summer Olympics, he lost to Al Robinson of the United States.

He won the 1968 Amateur Boxing Association British featherweight title, when boxing out of the Repton ABC.
