= Peter Odhiambo (boxer, born 1950) =

Ugandan boxer

Personal information
- Nationality: Ugandan
- Born: 25 November 1950 (age 74)

Sport
- Sport: Boxing

Peter Odhiambo (born 25 November 1950) is a Ugandan boxer. He competed in the men's lightweight event at the 1972 Summer Olympics.
