= Jovan Pajković =

Serbian boxer

Personal information
- Nationality: Serbian
- Born: 28 February 1946 (age 79); Bogdanovica, Yugoslavia

Sport
- Sport: Boxing

Jovan Pajković (born 28 February 1946) is a Serbian boxer. He competed in the men's featherweight event at the 1968 Summer Olympics.
