= Ovidio Sodor =

Argentine hockey player

Personal information
- Nationality: Argentine
- Born: 5 January 1947 (age 79)

Sport
- Sport: Field hockey

Ovidio Sodor (born 5 January 1947) is an Argentine field hockey player. He competed in the men's tournament at the 1972 Summer Olympics.
