= Mohamed Salah Amin =

Egyptian boxer (born 1947)

Personal information
- Nationality: Egyptian
- Born: 31 August 1947 (age 77)

Sport
- Sport: Boxing

Mohamed Salah Amin (born 31 August 1947) is an Egyptian boxer. He competed in the men's featherweight event at the 1972 Summer Olympics.
