= Fernando Calp =

Argentine field hockey player

Personal information
- Nationality: Argentine
- Born: 8 April 1946 (age 80)

Sport
- Sport: Field hockey

Fernando Calp (born 8 April 1946) is an Argentine field hockey player. He competed at the 1968 Summer Olympics, the 1972 Summer Olympics and the 1976 Summer Olympics.
