= José Luis Vellon =

Puerto Rican boxer

Personal information
- Nationality: Puerto Rican
- Born: 4 July 1954 (age 71) Santurce, San Juan, Puerto Rico
- Height: 174 cm (5 ft 9 in)
Medal record
Men's boxing
Representing Puerto Rico
Central American and Caribbean Games
Silver medal – second place	1974 Santo Domingo	-60 kg

José Luis Vellon (born 4 July 1954) is a Puerto Rican former boxer. He competed in the men's featherweight event at the 1972 Summer Olympics.
