= Jorge Llambí =

Argentine equestrian

Personal information
- Nationality: Argentine
- Born: 7 March 1939 (age 87)

Sport
- Sport: Equestrian
Medal record
Equestrian
Representing Argentina
Pan American Games
Silver medal – second place	1971 Cali	Individual jumping

Jorge Llambí (born 7 March 1939) is an Argentine equestrian. He competed in two events at the 1972 Summer Olympics.
