= Flavio de Giacomi =

Argentine field hockey player (born 1950)

Personal information
- Nationality: Argentine
- Born: 11 April 1950 (age 76)

Sport
- Sport: Field hockey

Flavio de Giacomi (born 11 April 1950) is an Argentine field hockey player. He competed at the 1972 Summer Olympics and the 1976 Summer Olympics.
