= Andrés Martín (boxer) =

Spanish boxer

Personal information
- Full name: Andrés Martín Rodríguez
- Nationality: Spanish
- Born: 5 March 1949 (age 76); Madrid, Spain

Sport
- Sport: Boxing

Andrés Martín Rodríguez (born 5 March 1949) is a Spanish boxer. He competed in the men's featherweight event at the 1968 Summer Olympics.
