= Alfonso Pérez (boxer) =

Colombian boxer (born 1949)

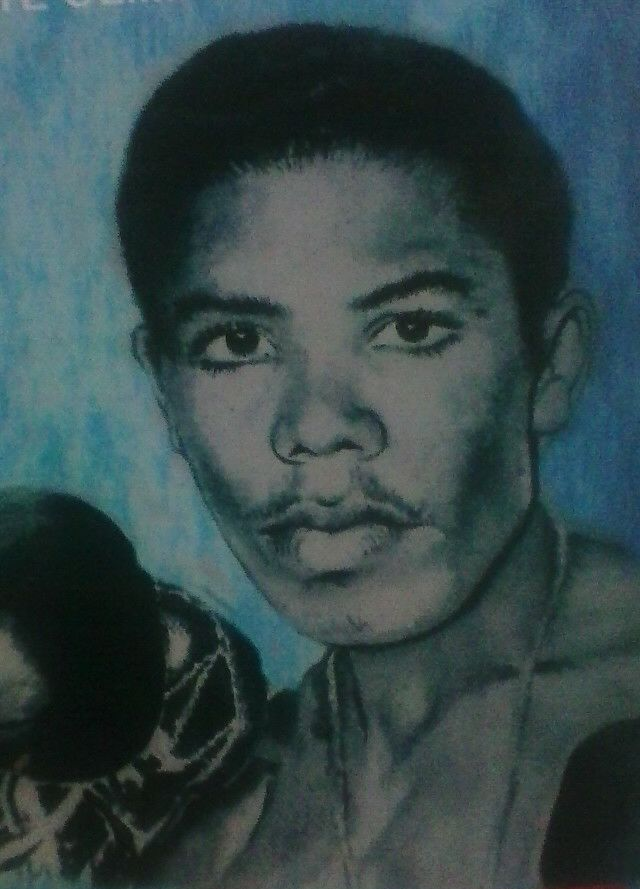
- Poster of Pérez, bronze medallist in lightweight boxing at the 1972 Olympics

Personal information
- Born: 16 January 1949 (age 77) Cartagena, Colombia

Boxing career
Medal record
Representing Colombia
Men's amateur boxing
Olympic Games
Bronze medal – third place	1972 Munich	Lightweight
Pan American Games
Silver medal – second place	1971 Cali	Lightweight

Alfonso Pérez (born 16 January 1949 in Cartagena) is a retired boxer from Colombia, who won the bronze medal in the men's lightweight division (– 60 kilograms) at the 1972 Summer Olympics. In 1971 he won the silver medal at the Pan American Games. He turned professional on 6 April 1973, and retired in 1981 after 40 bouts (27 wins, 10 losses and 3 draws, 20 of those wins by way of knockout).

Perez could fight as a lightweight or lose weight and compete as a featherweight, and he won by knockout in three rounds over the then-undefeated, future WBA world featherweight champion and hall of fame member Eusebio Pedroza. Perez was national champion in Colombia both as a featherweight and as a lightweight, and also the WBC's Caribbean area lightweight champion.

== 1972 Olympic record ==
Below is the record of Alfonso Pérez at the 1972 Munich Olympics:

- Round of 64: bye
- Round of 32: defeated Peter Odhiambo II (Uganda) by decision, 5-0
- Round of 16: defeated Karel Kaspar (Czechoslovakia) by decision, 5-0
- Quarterfinal: defeated Erasian Doruk (Turkey) by decision, 3-2
- Semifinal: lost to Laszlo Orban (Hungary) by decision, 2-3 (Perez was awarded a bronze medal)
