= Alberto Sabbione =

Argentine field hockey player

Personal information
- Full name: Alberto Enrique Sabbione Glerean
- Nationality: Argentine
- Born: 16 April 1948 (age 77)

Sport
- Sport: Field hockey

Alberto Enrique Sabbione Glerean (born 16 April 1948) is an Argentine field hockey player. He competed at the 1972 Summer Olympics and the 1976 Summer Olympics.
