= James Busceme =

American boxer

Personal information
- Full name: James Anthony Busceme Jr.
- Nickname: "Bubba"
- Born: February 14, 1952 (age 74) Beaumont, Texas, U.S.

Sport
- Sport: Boxing
Medal record
Men's amateur boxing
Representing the United States
North American Championships
Gold medal – first place	1971 Latham	Lightweight
Pan American Games
Bronze medal – third place	1971 Cali	Lightweight

James Anthony Busceme Jr. (born February 14, 1952), also known by the nickname "Bubba", is a retired American boxer, who became one of the most celebrated American amateur boxers in history.

== Amateur career ==
Born in Beaumont, Texas, Busceme was, at 132 pounds (60 kilograms), the 1971 National AAU champion and 1972 National Golden Gloves champion, defeating Norman Goins of Indianapolis in the final. He was also a Golden Gloves champion at 132 lb in 1971, and before that he won the Golden Gloves crown at 125 pounds (57 kilograms) in 1969 and 1970. His amateur record is reported to be 520-13. He competed at 132 pounds at the 1972 Munich Olympics.

=== 1972 Olympic results ===
Below is the record of James Busceme, an American lightweight boxer who competed at the 1972 Munich Olympics:

- Round of 64: bye
- Round of 32: defeated Praianan Vichit (Thailand) by decision, 5-0
- Round of 16: lost to Jan Szczepanski (Poland) by decision, 0-5

== Personal ==
In his post-boxing career, Busceme is a school teacher in Belize, the only official English-speaking country in Central America.
