= Nestor González =

Argentine wrestler (born 1937)

Nestor Gonzalez (born 25 September 1937) is an Argentine former wrestler who competed in the 1972 Summer Olympics.
