= Gustavo González (swimmer) =

Argentine swimmer

Personal information
- Full name: Gustavo Óscar González
- Born: 25 June 1953 (age 73)

Sport
- Sport: Swimming

Gustavo González (born 25 June 1953) is an Argentine former swimmer. He competed in four events at the 1972 Summer Olympics.
