= Habibu Kinyogoli =

Tanzanian boxer (born 1948)

Personal information
- Nationality: Tanzanian
- Born: 2 October 1948 (age 77)

Sport
- Sport: Boxing
Medal record
Men's amateur boxing
Representing Tanzania
All-Africa Games
Silver medal – second place	1973 Lagos	Bantamweight

Habibu Kinyogoli (born 2 October 1948) is a Tanzanian boxer. He competed in the men's featherweight event at the 1972 Summer Olympics. Kinyogoli also represented Tanzania at the 1970 and 1974 British Commonwealth Games. He won a silver medal in the 1973 All-Africa Games in the bantamweight category.
