= Antonio Comaschi =

Argentine boxer

Personal information
- Nationality: Argentine
- Born: 29 January 1951 (age 74)

Sport
- Sport: Boxing

Antonio Comaschi (born 29 January 1951) is an Argentine boxer. He competed in the men's lightweight event at the 1972 Summer Olympics.
