= Neville Cole =

Irish boxer

Personal information
- Nationality: Irish
- Born: 19 June 1952; Dublin, Ireland
- Died: 31 March 2009 (aged 56); Whitechapel, England

Sport
- Sport: Boxing

Neville Cole (19 June 1952 – 31 March 2009) was an Irish boxer. He competed in the men's lightweight event at the 1972 Summer Olympics, representing Great Britain.

Cole won the 1970 and 1972 Amateur Boxing Association British lightweight titles and the 1973 light-welterweight title, when boxing out of the Fitzroy Lodge ABC.
