= Mouldi Manai =

Tunisian boxer (born 1950)

Personal information
- Nationality: Tunisian
- Born: 2 April 1950 (age 74); El Kef, Tunisia

Sport
- Sport: Boxing

Mouldi Manai (born 2 April 1950) is a Tunisian boxer. He competed in the men's featherweight event at the 1968 Summer Olympics.
