= Reinaldo Mercado =

Puerto Rican boxer

Personal information
- Nationality: Puerto Rican
- Born: 24 September 1949 (age 75); Cayey, Puerto Rico

Sport
- Sport: Boxing

Reinaldo Mercado (born 24 September 1949) is a Puerto Rican boxer. He competed in the men's featherweight event at the 1968 Summer Olympics.
