= Larry Carlisle =

American boxer

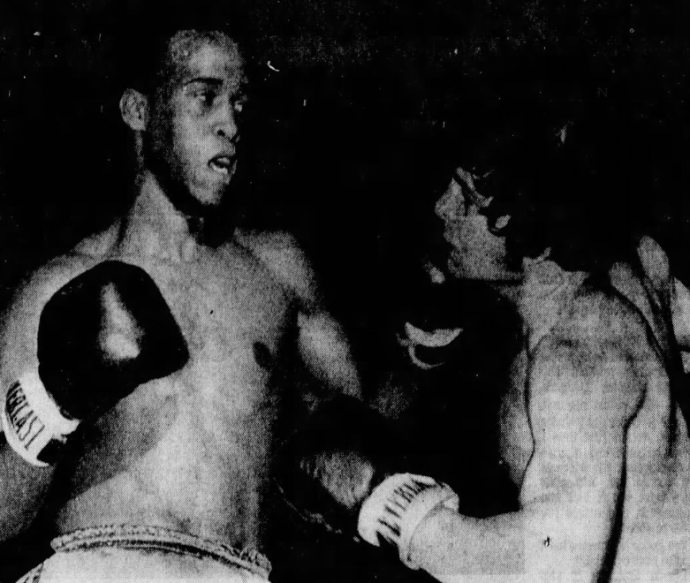
- Carlisle (left) punching Tommy Von Hatten on the chin, 1971

Personal information
- Nationality: American
- Born: 1947 or 1948 (age 78–79)
- Weight: Welterweight

Boxing career
Medal record
Men's amateur boxing
Representing United States
Pan American Games
| Silver medal – second place | 1971 Cali | Welterweight |

Larry Carlisle (born 1947/1948) (Note: Carlisle was 23 years old in 1971) is an American boxer.

== Life and career ==
Carlisle was a marine sergeant.

In 1970, Carlisle was named as North Carolina Amateur Athlete of the Year.

Carlisle competed at the 1971 Pan American Games, winning the silver medal in the welterweight event.
