= Silvia Borgini =

Argentine swimmer

Personal information
- Born: 22 October 1957 (age 69)

Sport
- Sport: Swimming

Silvia Borgini (born 22 October 1957) is an Argentine former swimmer. She competed in three events at the 1972 Summer Olympics.
