= Jorge Piccioli =

Argentine hockey player

Personal information
- Born: 11 January 1942 (age 84) Buenos Aires, Argentina

Sport
- Sport: Field hockey

Jorge Piccioli (born 11 January 1942) is an Argentine field hockey player. He competed at the 1968 Summer Olympics and the 1972 Summer Olympics.
