= Luis Rodríguez (Venezuelan boxer) =

Venezuelan boxer (born 1947)

Personal information
- Nationality: Venezuelan
- Born: 9 October 1947 (age 78)

Sport
- Sport: Boxing

Luis Rodríguez (born 9 October 1947) is a Venezuelan boxer. He competed in the men's lightweight event at the 1972 Summer Olympics.
