= Osvaldo Monti =

Argentine field hockey player

Personal information
- Born: 6 December 1945 (age 80) Buenos Aires, Argentina

Sport
- Sport: Field hockey

Osvaldo Monti (born 6 December 1945) is an Argentine field hockey player. He competed at the 1968 Summer Olympics and the 1972 Summer Olympics.
