= Horacio Rognoni =

Argentine field hockey player

Personal information
- Nationality: Argentine
- Born: 17 December 1942 (age 83)

Sport
- Sport: Field hockey

Horacio Rognoni (born 17 December 1942) is an Argentine field hockey player. He competed in the men's tournament at the 1972 Summer Olympics.
