= Daniel Portugués =

Argentine field hockey player

Personal information
- Nationality: Argentine
- Born: 27 January 1950 (age 76)

Sport
- Sport: Field hockey

Daniel Portugués (born 27 January 1950) is an Argentine field hockey player. He competed at the 1968 Summer Olympics, the 1972 Summer Olympics and the 1976 Summer Olympics.
