= Peter Hess (boxer) =

German boxer

Personal information
- Nationality: German
- Born: 16 May 1946 (age 78); Cologne, Germany

Sport
- Sport: Boxing

Peter Hess (born 16 May 1946) is a German boxer. He competed in the men's lightweight event at the 1972 Summer Olympics.
