= Samuel Mbugua =

Kenyan boxer (born 1946)

Olympic medal record

Men's Boxing
Bronze medal – third place	1972 Munich	Lightweight

Samuel Mbugua (born 1 January 1946) is a retired boxer from Kenya, who won the bronze medal in the lightweight division (– 60 kg) at the 1972 Summer Olympics in Munich, West Germany. In the semifinals he was defeated by Poland's eventual gold medalist Jan Szczepański (walk-over).
