= Ryszard Tomczyk (boxer) =

Polish boxer

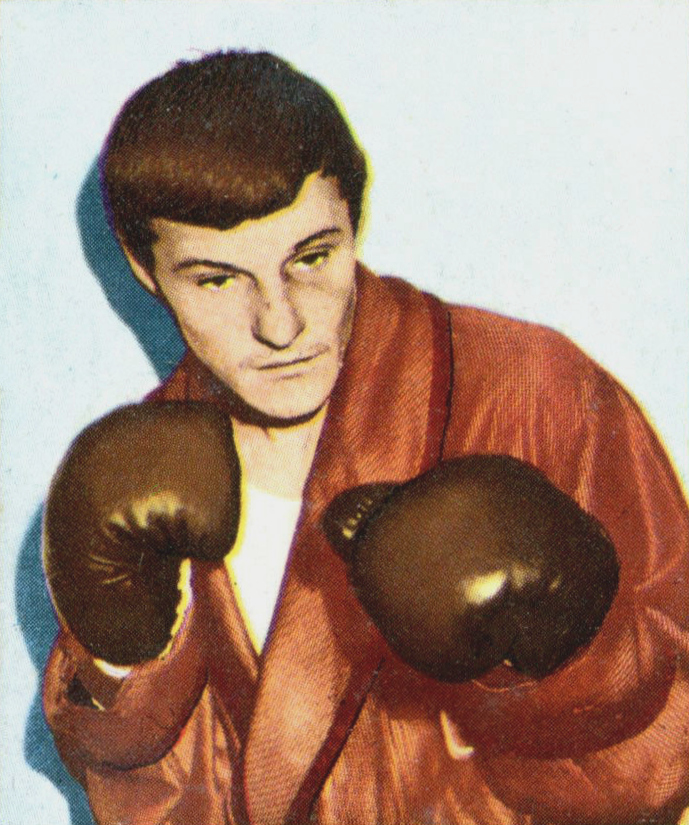
- Ryszard Tomczyk in 1972

Personal information
- Born: 27 April 1950 (age 76) Trzebnica, Poland
- Height: 168 cm (5 ft 6 in)

Sport
- Sport: Boxing
- Club: BKS Bolesławiec
Medal record
Representing Poland
European Amateur Boxing Championships
Gold medal – first place	1971 Madrid	-57 kg
Silver medal – second place	1973 Belgrade	-60 kg
Bronze medal – third place	1975 Katowice	-60 kg

Ryszard Tomczyk (born 27 April 1950) is a retired Polish featherweight boxer who won three medals at the European championships in 1971–75, including a gold in 1971. He competed at the 1972 Summer Olympics, and lost in the third bout to the eventual gold medalist Boris Kuznetsov.
