= Jesús Blanco =

Argentine wrestler

Jesús Blanco (born 18 November 1946) is an Argentine former wrestler who competed in the 1972 Summer Olympics.
