= Mario Ortíz (boxer) =

Argentine boxer

Personal information
- Born: 14 October 1953; San Rafael, Argentina
- Died: 11 September 1978 (aged 24); Mendoza, Argentina

Sport
- Sport: Boxing

Mario Ortíz (14 October 1953 – 11 September 1978) was an Argentine boxer. He competed in the men's featherweight event at the 1972 Summer Olympics.
