= Philip Waruinge =

Kenyan boxer (1945–2022)

Personal information
- Full name: Philip Waruinge
- Nationality: Kenyan
- Born: 3 February 1945 Murang'a, Central Province, Kenya
- Died: 19 October 2022 (aged 77) Nakuru, Kenya
- Height: 1.70 m (5 ft 7 in)
- Weight: 57 kg (126 lb)

Sport
- Sport: Boxing
- Weight class: Featherweight
Medal record
Olympic Games
Silver medal – second place	1972 Munich	Featherweight
Bronze medal – third place	1968 Mexico City	Featherweight
Commonwealth Games
Gold medal – first place	1966 Kingston	Featherweight
Gold medal – first place	1970 Edinburgh	Featherweight
Bronze medal – third place	1962 Perth	Flyweight
All-Africa Games
Gold medal – first place	1965 Brazzaville	Featherweight

Philip Waruinge (3 February 1945 – 19 October 2022) was a Kenyan professional boxer, who competed in the featherweight division (– 57 kg) during his career as an amateur.

== Personal life and death ==
Philip Waruinge was born on 3 February 1945 in Murang'a, Kenya. He died in Nakuru on 19 October 2022, at the age of 77.

== Career ==
=== Amateur career ===
Waruinge represented his native country at three consecutive Summer Olympics, starting in 1964. He won the bronze medal in Mexico City, Mexico (1968) losing 2:3 to local Antonio Roldan and was awarded the Val Barker Trophy for Outstanding Boxer at the 1968 Olympic Games.

Waruinge captured the silver in 1972 in Munich, West Germany.

=== 1972 Olympics ===
Below are the results of Philip Waruinge, a Kenyan featherweight boxer who competed at the 1972 Munich Olympics:

- Round of 64: bye
- Round of 32: defeated Jabbar Feli (Iran) by decision, 4–1
- Round of 16: defeated Salah Mohamed Amin (Egypt) by decision, 5–0
- Quarterfinal: defeated Jacko Lindberg (Finland) by decision, 4–1
- Semifinal: defeated Clemente Rojas (Colombia) by decision, 3–2
- Final: lost to Boris Kuznetsov (Soviet Union) by decision, 2-3 (was awarded silver medal)

=== Professional career ===
Waruinge turned professional in 1973 as a super bantamweight and had limited success. He fought largely in Japan. In 1976, Waruinge boxed against WBC Bantamweight titleholder Carlos Zarate. Waruinge was outclassed and was knocked out in the fourth round. He retired after a loss two years later, having competed in 25 professional bouts. He won 14, lost 10, and drew 1.
