= Antonio Gin =

Mexican boxer (born 1955)

Personal information
- Born: 12 June 1955 (age 69); Mexicali, Mexico

Sport
- Sport: Boxing

Antonio Gin (born 12 June 1955) is a Mexican boxer. He competed in the men's lightweight event at the 1972 Summer Olympics.
