= Jouko Lindbergh =

Finnish boxer

Personal information
- Nationality: Finnish
- Born: 25 August 1947 (age 77); Tampere, Finland

Sport
- Sport: Boxing

Jouko Lindbergh (born 25 August 1947) is a Finnish boxer. He competed at the 1968 Summer Olympics and the 1972 Summer Olympics. At the 1968 Summer Olympics, he lost to Michael Carter of Great Britain.
