= Hwad Abdel =

Sudanese boxer (born 1948)

Personal information
- Full name: Hwad Ibrahim Abdel Hamid
- Nationality: Sudanese
- Born: 1948; Wad Madani, Sudan
- Height: 1.62 m (5 ft 4 in)
- Weight: 57 kg (126 lb)

Sport
- Sport: Boxing

Hwad Ibrahim Abdel Hamid Lumomba (born 1948) is a Sudanese boxer. He competed in the 1968 Summer Olympics.
