= Andrés San Martín =

Argentine footballer

Personal information
- Full name: Andrés San Martín
- Date of birth: 12 April 1978 (age 48)
- Place of birth: Lomas de Zamora, Argentina
- Height: 1.83 m (6 ft 0 in)
- Position: Midfielder

Senior career*
Years	Team	Apps	(Gls)
1997–1999	Banfield	81	(3)
1999–2002	Unión Santa Fe	62	(3)
2003–2005	Banfield	31	(3)
2005–2008	River Plate	21	(0)
2006	→ Tenerife (loan)	12	(0)
2007–2008	→ Arsenal Sarandí (loan)	35	(3)
2008–2009	Arsenal Sarandí	1	(0)
2009–2010	River Plate		
2010	Sportivo Italiano		
- * Club domestic league appearances and goals

Andrés San Martín (born 12 April 1978 in Lomas de Zamora, Buenos Aires) is an Argentine former footballer who played as a midfielder.

== Club career ==
San Martín began his career in 1997 at second division club Club Atlético Banfield. Two years later, he moved to the top flight with Unión de Santa Fe. Meanwhile, his former team had won promotion to that level and, in 2002, the player rejoined Banfield.

In 2005, San Martín left Banfield for Club Atlético River Plate at the Estadio Monumental. After one season, he was loaned out to Spanish club CD Tenerife, in Segunda División, with the Canary Islands team having an option to buy at the season's closure. However, in December 2006, he was released, returning to his country, still on loan, with Arsenal de Sarandí.

At the end of the loan period, San Martín signed on a permanent basis, for the beginning of the Apertura 2008 tournament. In early 2009, he returned to River Plate for a second spell. After one season with the club, he was released and subsequently hired by third division's Sportivo Italiano.

== Honours ==
Season	Club	Title
2007	Arsenal Sarandí	South American Cup
