= Carlos Alberto Alvarado =

Argentine equestrian

Personal information
- Nationality: Argentine
- Born: 2 April 1945 (age 79)

Sport
- Sport: Equestrian

Carlos Alberto Alvarado (born 2 April 1945) is an Argentine equestrian. He competed in two events at the 1972 Summer Olympics.
