= Julio César Cufre =

Argentine hockey player

Personal information
- Nationality: Argentine
- Born: 13 March 1951 (age 75)

Sport
- Sport: Field hockey

Julio César Cufre (born 13 March 1951) is an Argentine field hockey player. He competed at the 1972 Summer Olympics and the 1976 Summer Olympics.
