= Mohamed Sourour =

Moroccan boxer (1940–2022)

Personal information
- Nationality: Moroccan
- Born: 11 March 1940 Marrakesh, French Morocco
- Died: 22 August 2022 (aged 82) Marrakesh, Morocco

Sport
- Sport: Boxing

Mohamed Sourour (11 March 1940 – 22 August 2022) was a Moroccan boxer. He competed at the 1968 Summer Olympics and the 1972 Summer Olympics. At the 1972 Summer Olympics, he lost to László Orbán of Hungary.
