= Kim Tae-ho (boxer) =

South Korean boxer (born 1952)

Personal information
- Nationality: South Korean
- Born: 5 June 1952 (age 73)

Sport
- Sport: Boxing

Kim Tae-ho (born 5 June 1952) is a South Korean boxer. He competed in the men's lightweight event at the 1972 Summer Olympics.
