= Gabriel Pometcu =

Romanian boxer

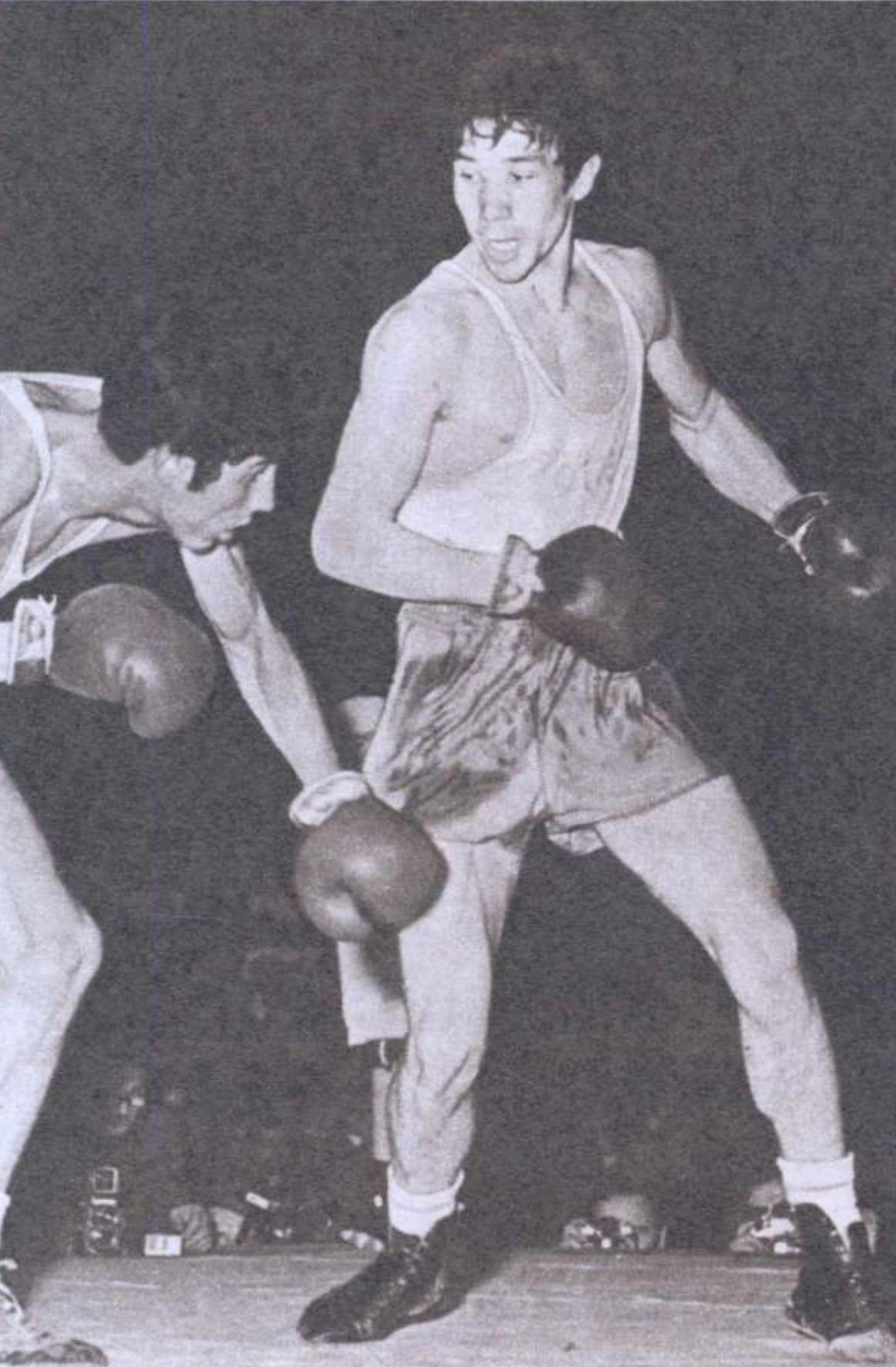

Personal information
- Nationality: Romanian
- Born: 23 July 1946 (age 80) Bucharest, Romania

Sport
- Sport: Boxing
Medal record
Representing Romania
Romania National Amateur Boxing Championships
Silver medal – second place	1969 Bucharest	Bantamweight
Silver medal – second place	1970 Bucharest	Bantamweight
Gold medal – first place	1971 Bucharest	Featherweight
Gold medal – first place	1972 Bucharest	Featherweight
Silver medal – second place	1974 Bucharest	Featherweight
European Amateur Championships
Bronze medal – third place	1971 Madrid	Featherweight
Bronze medal – third place	1973 Belgrade	Featherweight

Gabriel Pometcu (born 23 July 1946) is a Romanian boxer. He competed in the men's featherweight event at the 1972 Summer Olympics.
