= Michael Andrews (boxer) =

Nigerian boxer

Personal information
- Nationality: Nigerian

Sport
- Sport: Boxing

Michael Andrews is a Nigerian boxer. He competed in the men's featherweight event at the 1972 Summer Olympics.
