= Kim Sung-eun (boxer) =

South Korean boxer (1943–2007)

Personal information
- Nationality: South Korean
- Born: 10 June 1943; Jeju City, Korea, Empire of Japan
- Died: 2007 (aged 63–64)

Sport
- Sport: Boxing

Kim Sung-eun (Korean: 김성은, 10 June 1943 – 2007) was a South Korean boxer. He competed in the men's featherweight event at the 1968 Summer Olympics.
