= Louis Self =

American boxer

Personal information
- Nationality: American
- Born: February 12, 1950 (age 76) Toledo, Ohio, United States

Sport
- Sport: Boxing

Louis Self (born February 12, 1950) is an American boxer. He competed in the men's featherweight event at the 1972 Summer Olympics.
