= Boris Kuznetsov (boxer) =

Russian boxer (1947–2006)

Personal information
- Full name: Борис Георгиевич Кузнецов
- Nationality: Soviet Union
- Born: 23 February 1947 Astrakhan, Russian SFSR, Soviet Union
- Died: 3 May 2006 (aged 59)
- Height: 1.60 m (5 ft 3 in)
- Weight: 57 kg (126 lb)

Sport
- Sport: Boxing
- Weight class: Featherweight
- Club: Trudovye Rezervy Astrakhan
Medal record
Representing the Soviet Union
Olympic Games
Gold medal – first place	1972 Munich	Featherweight
World Championships
Silver medal – second place	1974 Havana	Featherweight

Boris Georgievich Kuznetsov (Russian: Борис Георгиевич Кузнецов; 23 February 1947 – 3 May 2006) was a Russian featherweight boxer. He won a gold medal at the 1972 Olympics and a silver medal at the 1974 World Championships. Domestically, he won the Soviet featherweight title in 1972 and 1974 and placed second in 1970 and 1971. During his career he won 237 fights out of 249. He became the Honoured Master of Sports of the USSR in 1972 and was awarded the Order of the Badge of Honor in the same year. He graduated from Astrakhan State Pedagogical Institute in 1971 and later opened a boxing school in Astrakhan.
