= Khaidavyn Altankhuyag =

Mongolian boxer (born 1946)

Personal information
- Nationality: Mongolian
- Born: 16 October 1946 (age 79)
- Height: 168 cm (5 ft 6 in)
- Weight: 60 kg (132 lb)

Boxing career
- Weight class: Lightweight
Medal record
Asian Championships
Gold medal – first place	1971 Tehran	Lightweight
Gold medal – first place	1975 Yokohama	Lightweight

Khaidavyn Altankhuyag (Хайдавын Алтанхуяг; born 16 October 1946, Nömrög, Zavkhan Province) is a Mongolian boxer. A two-time Asian champion, oldest honored boxer of Mongolia, a consultant coach of the Mongolian Boxing Federation, and a people′s teacher, he is known as "Golden Swallow" who wrote the history of Mongolian boxing. Altankhuyag also successfully worked as a coach in China, developing friendship between the boxing federations of Mongolia and China. Altankhuyag won a gold medal at the 1970 Spartakiad of socialist countries' police forces in Irkutsk, USSR. This was Mongolia's first international achievement in boxing. He competed at the 1972 Summer Olympics and the 1976 Summer Olympics. At the 1976 Summer Olympics, he lost to Tsvetan Tsvetkov of Bulgaria.
