= Ivan Mihailov (boxer) =

Bulgarian boxer (born 1944)

Medal record

Men's Boxing

Representing Bulgaria

Olympic Games
Bronze medal – third place	1968 Mexico City	Featherweight

Ivan Mihailov (Bulgarian: Иван Михайлов) (born 25 December 1944 in Sliven, Bulgaria) is a boxer from Bulgaria. He competed for Bulgaria in the 1968 Summer Olympics held in Mexico City, Mexico in the featherweight event where he finished in third place.

== Olympic results ==
=== 1968 – Mexico City ===
Below are Mihailov's results in the featherweight category at the 1968 Mexico City Olympics:

Round	Opponent	Result
Round of 32	(Poland) Jan Wadas	Won by decision 4–1
Round of 16	(Norway) Nils Dag Strømme	Won by decision 5–0
Quarterfinals	(Turkey) Seyfi Tatar	Won by decision 3–2
Semifinals	(United States) Al Robinson	Lost by decision 1–4 (won bronze medal)
