= Nils Dag Strømme =

Norwegian boxer (1945–2022)

Personal information
- Nationality: Norwegian
- Born: 29 July 1945; Kristiansand, Norway
- Died: 5 March 2022 (aged 76); Kristiansand, Norway

Sport
- Sport: Boxing

Nils Dag Strømme (29 July 1945 – 5 March 2022) was a Norwegian boxer. He competed at the 1968 Summer Olympics and the 1972 Summer Olympics. At the 1972 Summer Olympics he lost to Gabriel Pometcu of Romania. Strømme died on 5 March 2022, at the age of 76.
