= Boxing at the 1974 Asian Games =

Boxing competitions

- Venue: Mohammad Reza Shah Stadium
- Dates: 5–14 September 1974
- Competitors: 90 from 14 nations

Boxing at the 1974 Asian Games was held in Mohammad Reza Shah Stadium, Tehran, Iran between 5 and 14 September 1974.

== Medalists ==
Event	Gold	Silver	Bronze
Light flyweight (48 kg)	Park Chan-hee; South Korea	Abdolreza Ansari; Iran	Kim U-gil; North Korea
Light flyweight (48 kg)	Park Chan-hee; South Korea	Abdolreza Ansari; Iran	Noboru Uchiyama; Japan
Flyweight (51 kg)	Ku Yong-jo; North Korea	Hwang Chul-soon; South Korea	Chander Narayanan; India
Flyweight (51 kg)	Ku Yong-jo; North Korea	Hwang Chul-soon; South Korea	Kiyoyasu Uezu; Japan
Bantamweight (54 kg)	Hitoshi Ishigaki; Japan	Jung Yong-hwan; North Korea	Hamlet Minasian; Iran
Bantamweight (54 kg)	Hitoshi Ishigaki; Japan	Jung Yong-hwan; North Korea	Buyangiin Ganbat; Mongolia
Featherweight (57 kg)	Yu Jong-man; South Korea	Jabbar Feli; Iran	Willie Lucas; Philippines
Featherweight (57 kg)	Yu Jong-man; South Korea	Jabbar Feli; Iran	Arin Seubsanon; Thailand
Lightweight (60 kg)	Kim Tae-ho; South Korea	Sodnomyn Gombo; Mongolia	Hossein Madardoust; Iran
Lightweight (60 kg)	Kim Tae-ho; South Korea	Sodnomyn Gombo; Mongolia	Muniswamy Venu; India
Light welterweight (63.5 kg)	Ro Yong-so; North Korea	Park Tai-shik; South Korea	Satoshi Fukuda; Japan
Light welterweight (63.5 kg)	Ro Yong-so; North Korea	Park Tai-shik; South Korea	Farshid Enteghami; Iran
Welterweight (67 kg)	Kim Ju-seok; South Korea	Yoshifumi Seki; Japan	Ahmad Poureftekhari; Iran
Welterweight (67 kg)	Kim Ju-seok; South Korea	Yoshifumi Seki; Japan	Frans van Bronckhorst; Indonesia
Light middleweight (71 kg)	Sharif Delaram; Iran	Jang Ho-ryon; North Korea	Nicolas Aquilino; Philippines
Light middleweight (71 kg)	Sharif Delaram; Iran	Jang Ho-ryon; North Korea	Siraj-ud-Din; Pakistan
Middleweight (75 kg)	Kim Sung-chul; South Korea	Major Singh; India	Vartex Parsanian; Iran
Middleweight (75 kg)	Kim Sung-chul; South Korea	Major Singh; India	Habib-ur-Rehman; Pakistan
Light heavyweight (81 kg)	Masis Hambarsumian; Iran	Mehtab Singh; India	Khalid Hussain; Pakistan
Light heavyweight (81 kg)	Masis Hambarsumian; Iran	Mehtab Singh; India	None awarded
Heavyweight (+81 kg)	Abdolreza Andaveh; Iran	Til Bahadur Bura; India	Sowar Shah; Pakistan
Heavyweight (+81 kg)	Abdolreza Andaveh; Iran	Til Bahadur Bura; India	None awarded

== Medal table ==
Rank	Nation	Gold	Silver	Bronze	Total
1	South Korea (KOR)	5	2	0	7
2	Iran (IRN)	3	2	5	10
3	North Korea (PRK)	2	2	1	5
4	Japan (JPN)	1	1	3	5
5	India (IND)	0	3	2	5
6	Mongolia (MGL)	0	1	1	2
7	Pakistan (PAK)	0	0	4	4
8	Philippines (PHI)	0	0	2	2
9	Indonesia (INA)	0	0	1	1
9	Thailand (THA)	0	0	1	1
Totals (10 entries)		11	11	20	42

== Participating nations ==
A total of 90 athletes from 14 nations competed in boxing at the 1974 Asian Games:

- Hong Kong (1)
- India (6)
- Indonesia (4)
- Iran (11)
- Iraq (9)
- Japan (6)
- Mongolia (5)
- North Korea (8)
- Pakistan (11)
- Philippines (8)
- Singapore (2)
- South Korea (9)
- Sri Lanka (2)
- Thailand (8)

== Results ==
=== 48 kg ===
Preliminary; 5 September
Noboru Uchiyama (JPN)	PTS
Romilion Brana (PHI)
Likhasit Prathorn (THA)	RSC
Taha Daoud (IRQ)

Quarterfinals; 6–7 September
Abdolreza Ansari (IRN)	PTS
Lorensz de Kauwe (SRI)
Kim U-gil (PRK)	PTS
Arshad Qureshi (PAK)
Syed Abdul Kadir (SIN)
Park Chan-hee (KOR)	PTS
Noboru Uchiyama (JPN)	PTS
Likhasit Prathorn (THA)

Semifinals; 9–11 September
Abdolreza Ansari (IRN)	PTS
Kim U-gil (PRK)
Park Chan-hee (KOR)	PTS
Noboru Uchiyama (JPN)

Final; 14 September
Abdolreza Ansari (IRN)
Park Chan-hee (KOR)	PTS

=== 51 kg ===
Preliminary; 5 September
Hwang Chul-soon (KOR)	KO
Jan Muhammad Baloch (PAK)
Armid Bogosian (IRN)
Maitri Netmanee (THA)	RSC
Abdul-Zahra Jawad (IRQ)
Kiyoyasu Uezu (JPN)	DSQ
Charles Thomis (INA)
Ruben Mares (PHI)	PTS

Quarterfinals; 6–7 September
Ku Yong-jo (PRK)	PTS
Nyamdashiin Batsüren (MGL)
A. L. Sompala (SRI)
Chander Narayanan (IND)	KO
Hwang Chul-soon (KOR)	PTS
Maitri Netmanee (THA)
Kiyoyasu Uezu (JPN)	KO
Ruben Mares (PHI)

Semifinals; 11 September
Ku Yong-jo (PRK)	PTS
Chander Narayanan (IND)
Hwang Chul-soon (KOR)	PTS
Kiyoyasu Uezu (JPN)

Final; 14 September
Ku Yong-jo (PRK)	PTS
Hwang Chul-soon (KOR)

=== 54 kg ===
Preliminary; 5 September
Kim Chang-suk (KOR)
Buyangiin Ganbat (MGL)	PTS
Ferry Moniaga (INA)
Dorn Namvichit (THA)	PTS

Quarterfinals; 7 September
Hitoshi Ishigaki (JPN)	KO
Ismail Ibrahim (IRQ)
Hamlet Minasian (IRN)	DSQ
S. ud-Din (PAK)
Jung Yong-hwan (PRK)	PTS
Ricardo Fortaleza (PHI)
Buyangiin Ganbat (MGL)	DSQ
Dorn Namvichit (THA)

Semifinals; 11 September
Hitoshi Ishigaki (JPN)	PTS
Hamlet Minasian (IRN)
Jung Yong-hwan (PRK)	PTS
Buyangiin Ganbat (MGL)

Final; 14 September
Hitoshi Ishigaki (JPN)	PTS
Jung Yong-hwan (PRK)

=== 57 kg ===
Preliminary; 5 September
Sha Yan Teo (HKG)
Kim Yong-gik (PRK)	PTS
Arin Seubsanon (THA)	PTS
Cyril Jeeris (SIN)
Wasim Ahmed (PAK)
Galsandorjiin Batbileg (MGL)	RSC

Quarterfinals; 7 September
Takashi Okubo (JPN)
Yu Jong-man (KOR)	PTS
Kadhum Mohammed (IRQ)
Willie Lucas (PHI)	PTS
Jabbar Feli (IRN)	PTS
Kim Yong-gik (PRK)
Arin Seubsanon (THA)	PTS
Galsandorjiin Batbileg (MGL)

Semifinals; 11 September
Yu Jong-man (KOR)	PTS
Willie Lucas (PHI)
Jabbar Feli (IRN)	WO
Arin Seubsanon (THA)

Final; 14 September
Yu Jong-man (KOR)	KO
Jabbar Feli (IRN)

=== 60 kg ===
Quarterfinals; 6 September
Hossein Madardoust (IRN)	PTS
Floong Pankaew (THA)
Farouk Janjoun (IRQ)
Sodnomyn Gombo (MGL)	PTS
Kim Tae-ho (KOR)	PTS
Samad Mir (PAK)
Tito Gonzaga (PHI)
Muniswamy Venu (IND)	PTS

Semifinals; 11 September
Hossein Madardoust (IRN)
Sodnomyn Gombo (MGL)	PTS
Kim Tae-ho (KOR)	PTS
Muniswamy Venu (IND)

Final; 14 September
Sodnomyn Gombo (MGL)
Kim Tae-ho (KOR)	WO

=== 63.5 kg ===
Preliminary; 5 September
Malang Balouch (PAK)
Farshid Enteghami (IRN)	PTS

Quarterfinals; 7 September
Syamsul Anwar Harahap (INA)
Ro Yong-so (PRK)	PTS
Satoshi Fukuda (JPN)	PTS
Kasem Prapaisri (THA)
Nemesio Gonzaga (PHI)
Park Tai-shik (KOR)	PTS
Zebraj Sebti (IRQ)
Farshid Enteghami (IRN)	PTS

Semifinals; 12 September
Ro Yong-so (PRK)	PTS
Satoshi Fukuda (JPN)
Park Tai-shik (KOR)	PTS
Farshid Enteghami (IRN)

Final; 14 September
Ro Yong-so (PRK)	PTS
Park Tai-shik (KOR)

=== 67 kg ===
Preliminary; 5 September
Shakir Shenaishil (IRQ)	RET
Muhammad Mumtaz (PAK)

Quarterfinals; 8 September
Yoshifumi Seki (JPN)	RSC
Eugenio Valmocina (PHI)
Ahmad Poureftekhari (IRN)	PTS
Sathit Chindarasi (THA)
Ri Bong-hi (PRK)
Frans van Bronckhorst (INA)	PTS
Kim Ju-seok (KOR)	PTS
Shakir Shenaishil (IRQ)

Semifinals; 12 September
Yoshifumi Seki (JPN)	PTS
Ahmad Poureftekhari (IRN)
Frans van Bronckhorst (INA)
Kim Ju-seok (KOR)	KO

Final; 14 September
Yoshifumi Seki (JPN)
Kim Ju-seok (KOR)	PTS

=== 71 kg ===
Preliminary; 5 September
Salem Sabri (IRQ)
Siraj-ud-Din (PAK)	RSC

Quarterfinals; 8 September
B. Singh (IND)
Sharif Delaram (IRN)	PTS
Nicolas Aquilino (PHI)	PTS
P. Chairva (THA)
Azhar Ganzug (MGL)
Jang Ho-ryon (PRK)	KO
Jang Jung-kyu (KOR)
Siraj-ud-Din (PAK)	PTS

Semifinals; 12 September
Sharif Delaram (IRN)	PTS
Nicolas Aquilino (PHI)
Jang Ho-ryon (PRK)	WO
Siraj-ud-Din (PAK)

Final; 14 September
Sharif Delaram (IRN)	PTS
Jang Ho-ryon (PRK)

=== 75 kg ===
Quarterfinals; 8 September
Major Singh (IND)	RSC
Ali Abdul-Ameer (IRQ)
Habib-ur-Rehman (PAK)	PTS
Jang Bong-mun (PRK)

Semifinals; 12 September
Vartex Parsanian (IRN)
Kim Sung-chul (KOR)	PTS
Major Singh (IND)	RSC
Habib-ur-Rehman (PAK)

Final; 14 September
Kim Sung-chul (KOR)	PTS
Major Singh (IND)

=== 81 kg ===
Semifinals; 12 September		Final; 14 September
		Mehtab Singh (IND)
Khalid Hussain (PAK)		Masis Hambarsumian (IRN)	PTS
Masis Hambarsumian (IRN)	PTS

=== +81 kg ===
Semifinals; 12 September		Final; 14 September
		Til Bahadur Bura (IND)
Sowar Shah (PAK)		Abdolreza Andaveh (IRN)	DSQ
Abdolreza Andaveh (IRN)	PTS
