= Boxing at the 1972 Summer Olympics – Flyweight =

Olympic boxing tournament

Flyweight boxing at the Games of the XX Olympiad
- Venue: Boxing Hall, Munich
- Dates: 27 August – 10 September 1972
- Competitors: 36 from 36 nations

Medalists
1st place, gold medalist(s)		Georgi Kostadinov	Bulgaria
2nd place, silver medalist(s)		Leo Rwabwogo	Uganda
3rd place, bronze medalist(s)		Leszek Błażyński	Poland
3rd place, bronze medalist(s)		Douglas Rodríguez	Cuba

The men's flyweight event was part of the boxing programme at the 1972 Summer Olympics. The weight class allowed boxers of up to 51 kilograms to compete. The competition was held from 27 August to 10 September 1972. 36 boxers from 36 nations competed.

== Medalists ==
Gold	Georgi Kostadinov; Bulgaria
Silver	Leo Rwabwogo; Uganda
Bronze	Leszek Błażyński; Poland
Bronze	Douglas Rodríguez; Cuba

== Results ==
The following boxers took part in the event:

Rank	Name	Country
1	Georgi Kostadinov	Bulgaria
2	Leo Rwabwogo	Uganda
3T	Leszek Błażyński	Poland
3T	Douglas Rodríguez	Cuba
5T	Yu Jong-man	South Korea
5T	Calixto Pérez	Colombia
5T	Boris Zoriktuyev	Soviet Union
5T	Neil McLaughlin	Ireland
9T	Arturo Delgado	Mexico
9T	Nyamdashiin Batsüren	Mongolia
9T	Tim Dement	United States
9T	Chris Ius	Canada
9T	Franco Udella	Italy
9T	Constantin Gruiescu	Romania
9T	Chawalit On-Chim	Thailand
9T	Mohamed Selim Soheim	Egypt
17T	Salvador Miranda	Nicaragua
17T	Chander Narayanan	India
17T	Saidi Tambwe	Tanzania
17T	Antonio García	Spain
17T	Martín Vargas	Chile
17T	Ali Gharbi	Tunisia
17T	Jan Balouch	Pakistan
17T	Ali Ouabbou	Morocco
17T	Vanlal Dawla	Burma
17T	Felix Maina	Kenya
17T	Kemal Solunur	Turkey
17T	Fujio Nagai	Japan
17T	Maurice O'Sullivan	Great Britain
17T	Gerd Schubert	West Germany
32T	Wilfredo Gómez	Puerto Rico
32T	Jorge Acuña	Uruguay
32T	Rabah Khaloufi	France
32T	Rene Fortaleza	Philippines
32T	Jorge Mejía	Ecuador
32T	Mohamed Abakkar	Sudan

=== First round ===
- Leo Rwabwogo (UGA) def. Jorge Acuña (URU), 5:0
- Maurice O'Sullivan (GBR) def. Rabah Kaloufi (FRA), 3:2
- Fujio Nagai (JPN) def. Renato Fortaleza (PHI), 4:1
- Douglas Rodríguez (CUB) def. Jorge Mejia (ECU), 5:0
- Gerd Schubert (FRG) def. Phar Khong (CMB), walk-over
- Orn-Chim Chawalit (THA) def. Sandor Orbán (HUN), walk-over
- Arturo Delgado (MEX) def. Salvador Miranda (NIC), TKO-3

=== Second round ===
- Leszek Blazynski (POL) def. Chander Narayanan (IND), 3:2
- You Man-Chong (KOR) def. Saidi Tambwe (TNZ), 5:0
- Niamdash Batsuren (MGL) def. Antonio García (ESP), 4:1
- Calixto Perez (COL) def. Martin Vargas (CHL), 5:0
- Tim Dement (USA) def. Ali Gharbi (TUN), 5:0
- Georgi Kostadinov (BUL) def. Jan Balouch (PAK), TKO-2
- Chris Ius (CAN) def. Ali Ouabbou (MAR), 3:2
- Boris Zoriktuyev (URS) def. Dawla Vanlal (BUR), TKO-3
- Franco Udella (ITA) def. Felix Maina (KEN), 5:0
- Constantin Gruescu (ROU) def. Kemal Sonunur (TUR), 5:0
- Douglas Rodríguez (CUB) def. Fujio Nagai (JPN), 5:0
- Leo Rwabwogo (UGA) def. Maurice O'Sullivan (GBR), TKO-1
- Orn-Chim Chawalit (THA) def. Gerd Schubert (FRG), 4:1
- Mohamed Selim (EGY) def. Wilfredo Gómez (PUR), 4:1
- Neil McLaughlin (IRL) def. Abaker Saed Mohamed (SUD), 5:0

=== Third round ===
- Leszek Blazynski (POL) def. Arturo Delgado (MEX), 5:0
- You Man-Chong (KOR) def. Niamdash Batsuren (MGL), 4:1
- Calixto Perez (COL) def. Tim Dement (USA), 5:0
- Georgi Kostadinov (BUL) def. Chris Ius (CAN), 5:0
- Boris Zoriktuyev (URS) def. Franco Udella (ITA), 4:1
- Douglas Rodríguez (CUB) def. Constantin Gruescu (ROU), 3:2
- Leo Rwabwogo (UGA) def. Orn-Chim Chawalit (THA), 4:1
- Neil McLaughlin (IRL) def. Mohamed Selim (EGY), KO-2

=== Quarterfinals ===
- Leszek Blazynski (POL) def. You Man-Chong (KOR), 3:2
- Georgi Kostadinov (BUL) def. Calixto Perez (COL), 3:2
- Douglas Rodríguez (CUB) def. Boris Zoriktuyev (URS), TKO-3
- Leo Rwabwogo (UGA) def. Neil McLaughlin (IRL), TKO-3

=== Semifinals ===
- Georgi Kostadinov (BUL) def. Leszek Blazynski (POL), 5:0
- Leo Rwabwogo (UGA) def. Douglas Rodríguez (CUB), 3:2

=== Final ===
- Georgi Kostadinov (BUL) def. Leo Rwabwogo (UGA), 5:0
