= 1971 Asian Amateur Boxing Championships =

1971 Asian Boxing Championships
- Host city: Tehran, Iran
- Dates: 27 August – 1 September 1971
- Main venue: Mohammad Reza Shah Stadium

The fifth edition of the Men's Asian Amateur Boxing Championships was held from 27 August to 1 September 1971 in Tehran, Iran.

== Medal summary ==
Event	Gold	Silver	Bronze
Light flyweight 48 kg	Lee Suk-un; South Korea	Rene Fortaleza; Philippines	Yoshimitsu Aragaki; Japan
Light flyweight 48 kg	Lee Suk-un; South Korea	Rene Fortaleza; Philippines	Abdul Raouf; Pakistan
Flyweight; 51 kg	Chander Narayanan; India	Surapong Sripirom; Thailand	Ferry Moniaga; Indonesia
Flyweight; 51 kg	Chander Narayanan; India	Surapong Sripirom; Thailand	Jan Muhammad Baloch; Pakistan
Bantamweight; 54 kg	Ko Saing-keun; South Korea	Ricardo Fortaleza; Philippines	Manouchehr Bahmani; Iran
Bantamweight; 54 kg	Ko Saing-keun; South Korea	Ricardo Fortaleza; Philippines	Richard Clement; Pakistan
Featherweight; 57 kg	Sohrab Vakil Monfared; Iran	Preecha Nopparat; Thailand	Nau Bahar; Pakistan
Featherweight; 57 kg	Sohrab Vakil Monfared; Iran	Preecha Nopparat; Thailand	None awarded
Lightweight; 60 kg	Khaidavyn Altankhuyag; Mongolia	Muniswamy Venu; India	Mohsen Sahafi; Iran
Lightweight; 60 kg	Khaidavyn Altankhuyag; Mongolia	Muniswamy Venu; India	Sawart Wongkaew; Thailand
Light welterweight 63.5 kg	Bantow Srisook; Thailand	Ramon Babaei; Iran	Benjamin Molero; Philippines
Light welterweight 63.5 kg	Bantow Srisook; Thailand	Ramon Babaei; Iran	Malang Balouch; Pakistan
Welterweight; 67 kg	Jung Young-geun; South Korea	Damdinjavyn Bandi; Mongolia	Hosseingholi Nohroudi; Iran
Welterweight; 67 kg	Jung Young-geun; South Korea	Damdinjavyn Bandi; Mongolia	Frans van Bronckhorst; Indonesia
Light middleweight 71 kg	Abdollah Ghasemi; Iran	Habib-ur-Rehman; Pakistan	Namkhain Tsend-Ayuush; Mongolia
Light middleweight 71 kg	Abdollah Ghasemi; Iran	Habib-ur-Rehman; Pakistan	Kamchad Chaloksiri; Thailand
Middleweight; 75 kg	Wiem Gommies; Indonesia	Masoud Keshmiri; Iran	Doulema; Mongolia
Middleweight; 75 kg	Wiem Gommies; Indonesia	Masoud Keshmiri; Iran	Pratarn Term; Thailand
Light heavyweight 81 kg	Mehtab Singh; India	Gombyn Zorig; Mongolia	Mehdi Hoviatdoust; Iran
Light heavyweight 81 kg	Mehtab Singh; India	Gombyn Zorig; Mongolia	Khizar Hayat; Pakistan
Heavyweight +81 kg	Masoud Hajrasouli; Iran	None awarded	Somart Kanchanavra; Thailand
Heavyweight +81 kg	Masoud Hajrasouli; Iran	None awarded	None awarded

== Medal table ==
Rank	Nation	Gold	Silver	Bronze	Total
1	Iran	3	2	4	9
2	South Korea	3	0	0	3
3	India	2	1	0	3
4	Thailand	1	2	4	7
5	Mongolia	1	2	2	5
6	Indonesia	1	0	2	3
7	Philippines	0	2	1	3
8	Pakistan	0	1	6	7
9	Japan	0	0	1	1
Totals (9 entries)		11	10	20	41
