= 1973 Asian Amateur Boxing Championships =

Boxing competitions

1973 Asian Boxing Championships
- Host city: Bangkok, Thailand
- Dates: 3–9 May 1973
- Main venue: Kittikachorn Stadium

The sixth edition of the Men's Asian Amateur Boxing Championships was held from 3 to 9 May 1973 in Bangkok, Thailand.

== Medal summary ==
Event	Gold	Silver	Bronze
Light flyweight 48 kg	Likhasit Prathorn; Thailand	Lorensz de Kauwe; Sri Lanka	Kim Chi-bok; South Korea
Light flyweight 48 kg	Likhasit Prathorn; Thailand	Lorensz de Kauwe; Sri Lanka	Ghasem Salmasdani; Iran
Flyweight; 51 kg	Maitri Netmanee; Thailand	Chander Narayanan; India	Hwang Chul-soon; South Korea
Flyweight; 51 kg	Maitri Netmanee; Thailand	Chander Narayanan; India	Suichi Sakaki; Japan
Bantamweight; 54 kg	Dorn Namvichit; Thailand	Abdollatif Etmanzadeh; Iran	Kazunori Aisaka; Japan
Bantamweight; 54 kg	Dorn Namvichit; Thailand	Abdollatif Etmanzadeh; Iran	Sirisena Wijetunge; Sri Lanka
Featherweight; 57 kg	Jabbar Feli; Iran	Hideaki Otsuka; Japan	Cyril Jeeris; Singapore
Featherweight; 57 kg	Jabbar Feli; Iran	Hideaki Otsuka; Japan	Tso Shu Yan; Hong Kong
Lightweight; 60 kg	Kim Tae-ho; South Korea	Vichit Praianan; Thailand	Hossein Eghmaz; Iran
Lightweight; 60 kg	Kim Tae-ho; South Korea	Vichit Praianan; Thailand	Tobias Totu; Malaysia
Light welterweight 63.5 kg	Kasem Prapaisri; Thailand	Farshid Enteghami; Iran	Y. Kayaki; Japan
Light welterweight 63.5 kg	Kasem Prapaisri; Thailand	Farshid Enteghami; Iran	Park Tai-shik; South Korea
Welterweight; 67 kg	Frans van Bronckhorst; Indonesia	Lee Chang-woo; South Korea	Bantow Srisook; Thailand
Welterweight; 67 kg	Frans van Bronckhorst; Indonesia	Lee Chang-woo; South Korea	Yoshifumi Seki; Japan
Light middleweight 71 kg	Rabieb Sangnual; Thailand	Lim Jae-keun; South Korea	Gou Rong-tai; Republic of China
Light middleweight 71 kg	Rabieb Sangnual; Thailand	Lim Jae-keun; South Korea	T. Hayashi; Japan
Middleweight; 75 kg	Kim Sung-chul; South Korea	Paitoon Sangkasit; Thailand	Wiem Gommies; Indonesia
Middleweight; 75 kg	Kim Sung-chul; South Korea	Paitoon Sangkasit; Thailand	Mohammad Agharezaei; Iran
Light heavyweight 81 kg	Mehtab Singh; India	Orahon Wongmeungchan; Thailand	Masis Hambarsumian; Iran
Light heavyweight 81 kg	Mehtab Singh; India	Orahon Wongmeungchan; Thailand	Lim Rong-men; Republic of China
Heavyweight +81 kg	Abdolreza Andaveh; Iran	Mohamed Aslam; India	Songchai Srinthrasut; Thailand
Heavyweight +81 kg	Abdolreza Andaveh; Iran	Mohamed Aslam; India	Asmad Rashid; Brunei

== Medal table ==
Rank	Nation	Gold	Silver	Bronze	Total
1	Thailand	5	3	2	10
2	Iran	2	2	4	8
3	South Korea	2	2	3	7
4	India	1	2	0	3
5	Indonesia	1	0	1	2
6	Japan	0	1	5	6
7	Sri Lanka	0	1	1	2
8	Republic of China	0	0	2	2
9	Brunei	0	0	1	1
9	Hong Kong	0	0	1	1
9	Malaysia	0	0	1	1
9	Singapore	0	0	1	1
Totals (12 entries)		11	11	22	44
