= 1975 Asian Amateur Boxing Championships =

Boxing competitions

1975 Asian Boxing Championships
- Host city: Yokohama, Japan
- Dates: 23–28 September 1975

The seventh edition of the Men's Asian Amateur Boxing Championships was held from September 23–28, 1975 in Yokohama, Japan.

== Medal summary ==
Event	Gold	Silver	Bronze
Light flyweight 48 kg	Kim Chi-bok; South Korea	Noboru Uchiyama; Japan	Syed Abdul Kadir; Singapore
Light flyweight 48 kg	Kim Chi-bok; South Korea	Noboru Uchiyama; Japan	Tada Manasirmwong; Thailand
Flyweight; 51 kg	Fujio Nagai; Japan	Payao Poontarat; Thailand	Kang Hee-yong; South Korea
Flyweight; 51 kg	Fujio Nagai; Japan	Payao Poontarat; Thailand	Vanduin Batbayar; Mongolia
Bantamweight; 54 kg	Hitoshi Ishigaki; Japan	Rene Fortaleza; Philippines	Manglim Sument; Thailand
Bantamweight; 54 kg	Hitoshi Ishigaki; Japan	Rene Fortaleza; Philippines	Kim Byung-jin; South Korea
Featherweight; 57 kg	Yu Jong-man; South Korea	Rey Fortaleza; Philippines	Idwan Anwar; Indonesia
Featherweight; 57 kg	Yu Jong-man; South Korea	Rey Fortaleza; Philippines	Takashi Okubo; Japan
Lightweight; 60 kg	Khaidavyn Altankhuyag; Mongolia	Cyril Jeeris; Singapore	Surat Seingloa; Thailand
Lightweight; 60 kg	Khaidavyn Altankhuyag; Mongolia	Cyril Jeeris; Singapore	Takao Miura; Japan
Light welterweight 63.5 kg	Akio Kameda; Japan	Sadie Jabbar; Iraq	Qadir Zaman; Pakistan
Light welterweight 63.5 kg	Akio Kameda; Japan	Sadie Jabbar; Iraq	Bakshish Singh; India
Welterweight; 67 kg	Yoshifumi Seki; Japan	Farshid Enteghami; Iran	Manus Meerat; Thailand
Welterweight; 67 kg	Yoshifumi Seki; Japan	Farshid Enteghami; Iran	Kim Ju-seok; South Korea
Light middleweight 71 kg	Shoichi Yamaguchi; Japan	Damdinjavyn Bandi; Mongolia	Satiant Chindasri; Thailand
Light middleweight 71 kg	Shoichi Yamaguchi; Japan	Damdinjavyn Bandi; Mongolia	Lee Chang-woo; South Korea
Middleweight; 75 kg	Kim Sung-chul; South Korea	Dashnyamyn Olzvoi; Mongolia	Siraj-ud-Din; Pakistan
Middleweight; 75 kg	Kim Sung-chul; South Korea	Dashnyamyn Olzvoi; Mongolia	Mani Kumar Rai; India
Light heavyweight 81 kg	Toshiaki Suzuki; Japan	Park Chun-kum; South Korea	Benny Maniani; Indonesia
Light heavyweight 81 kg	Toshiaki Suzuki; Japan	Park Chun-kum; South Korea	Iqbal Muhammad; Pakistan
Heavyweight +81 kg	Parviz Badpa; Iran	Mohamed Aslam; India	Hideharu Yoshimura; Japan
Heavyweight +81 kg	Parviz Badpa; Iran	Mohamed Aslam; India	Kim Ok-tae; South Korea

== Medal table ==
Rank	Nation	Gold	Silver	Bronze	Total
1	Japan	6	1	3	10
2	South Korea	3	1	5	9
3	Mongolia	1	2	1	4
4	Iran	1	1	0	2
5	Philippines	0	2	0	2
6	Thailand	0	1	5	6
7	India	0	1	2	3
8	Singapore	0	1	1	2
9	Iraq	0	1	0	1
10	Pakistan	0	0	3	3
11	Indonesia	0	0	2	2
Totals (11 entries)		11	11	22	44
