= Leszek Błażyński =

Polish boxer (1949–1992)

Personal information
- Full name: Leszek Błażyński
- Nationality: Polish
- Born: 5 March 1949 Ełk, Warmińsko-Mazurskie
- Died: 6 August 1992 (aged 43) Katowice, Śląskie
- Height: 1.65 m (5 ft 5 in)
- Weight: 50 kg (110 lb)

Sport
- Sport: Boxing
- Weight class: Flyweight
- Club: BBTS Włókniarz Bielsko-Biała; Szombierki Bytom
Medal record
Olympic Games
Bronze medal – third place	1972 Munich	Flyweight
Bronze medal – third place	1976 Montreal	Flyweight
European Amateur Championships
Gold medal – first place	1977 Halle	Flyweight
Silver medal – second place	1971 Madrid	Flyweight

Leszek Błażyński (Polish pronunciation: [ˈlɛʂɛk ˈbwaʐɨj̃skʲi]; 5 March 1949 – 6 August 1992) was a Polish boxer who twice won the bronze medal in the men's flyweight (– 51 kg) division at the Summer Olympics. He first did so in 1972, when Munich hosted the Games. Four years later in Montreal, he once again captured the bronze after a loss in the semifinals against eventual winner Leo Randolph of the United States.

Błażyński won the silver medal in the 1971 European Amateur Boxing Championships and the gold medal in the 1977 European Amateur Boxing Championships. Later in his career, he became a boxing coach.

== Personal life ==
Błażyński was born in Ełk, Warmińsko-Mazurskie. His father died of tuberculosis when Błażyński was 12 years old. The father's death caused financial hardship for the surviving family, which prompted Błażyński, whose boxing talent was already showing, to start fighting to earn food.

He eventually married and had two children, one of whom became a sports journalist.

He struggled with alcohol and became depressed after his wife died of injuries from a serious fall. He died in 1992 in Katowice, Śląskie, at the age of 43. The cause of death was suicide. He was buried at the Communal Cemetery in Katowice.

== Olympic results ==
1972

- Round of 64: bye
- Round of 32: Defeated Chander Narayanan (India) 3–2
- Round of 16: Defeated Arturo Delgado (Mexico) 5–0
- Quarterfinal: Defeated You Man-Chong (South Korea) 3–2 in a split decision
- Semifinal: Lost to Georgi Kostadinov (Bulgaria) 0-5 (was awarded bronze medal)

1976

- Round of 32: Defeated Antônio Toledo Filho (Brazil) KO 2
- Round of 16: Defeated Fazlija Sacirović (Yugoslavia) 3–2
- Quarterfinal: Defeated Alfredo Pérez (Venezuela) 3–2
- Semifinal: Lost to Leo Randolph (United States) 1-4 (was awarded bronze medal)
