= Boxing at the 1971 SEAP Games =

Boxing at the 1971 Southeast Asian Peninsular Games
- Venue: Chin Woo Stadium
- Date: 12–16 December
- Competitors: 34 from 5 nations

Boxing is one of the 15 sports featured in the 1971 Southeast Asian Peninsular Games. The tournament was held from 12 to 16 December 1971 at Chin Woo Stadium in Kuala Lumpur, Malaysia.

== Participating countries ==
- Burma
- Khmer Republic
- Malaysia (Host)
- Singapore
- Thailand

== Medal table ==
Rank	Nation	Gold	Silver	Bronze	Total
1	Thailand (THA)	5	1	3	9
2	Burma (BIR)	3	2	0	5
3	Singapore (SIN)	1	2	2	5
4	Malaysia (MAS)*	0	2	6	8
5	Khmer Republic (KHM)	0	2	3	5
Totals (5 entries)		9	9	14	32

== Medalists ==
Event	Gold	Silver	Bronze
Light flyweight (48 kg)	Syed Abdul Kadir; Singapore	Vanlal Dawla; Burma	Watarakul Omsin; Thailand
Light flyweight (48 kg)	Syed Abdul Kadir; Singapore	Vanlal Dawla; Burma	Bernard Santos; Malaysia
Flyweight (51 kg)	Thet Oo Lay; Burma	Chawalit On-Chim; Thailand	Chhom Chhay; Khmer Republic
Flyweight (51 kg)	Thet Oo Lay; Burma	Chawalit On-Chim; Thailand	Shariff bin Ali; Malaysia
Bantamweight (54 kg)	Win Maung; Burma	Phar Khong; Khmer Republic	Soonthahin Sunai; Thailand
Bantamweight (54 kg)	Win Maung; Burma	Phar Khong; Khmer Republic	Cyril Jeeris; Singapore
Featherweight (57 kg)	Sann Myint; Burma	G. Thanabal; Singapore	Bootpet Nil; Thailand
Featherweight (57 kg)	Sann Myint; Burma	G. Thanabal; Singapore	Baharom Ahmad; Malaysia
Lightweight (60 kg)	Sawart Wongkaew; Thailand	Soth Sun; Khmer Republic	Ismail bin Darus; Singapore
Lightweight (60 kg)	Sawart Wongkaew; Thailand	Soth Sun; Khmer Republic	Chan Kin Ho; Malaysia
Light welterweight (63.5 kg)	Bantow Srisook; Thailand	Hashim Masud; Singapore	Chhay Savath; Khmer Republic
Light welterweight (63.5 kg)	Bantow Srisook; Thailand	Hashim Masud; Singapore	Suaner Sain; Malaysia
Welterweight (67 kg)	Virat Vilarlak; Thailand	Tobias Totu; Malaysia	—N/a
Light middleweight (71 kg)	Rabieb Sangnual; Thailand	Ni Ni; Burma	Kadir Hussain; Malaysia
Light middleweight (71 kg)	Rabieb Sangnual; Thailand	Ni Ni; Burma	Long Savoen; Khmer Republic
Middleweight (75 kg)	Pratarn Term; Thailand	Rahim Farid; Malaysia	—N/a

== Results ==
=== Light flyweight (48 kg) ===
Semifinals
Syed Abdul Kadir (SIN)	PTS
Watarakul Omsin (THA)
Vanlal Dawla (BIR)	PTS
Bernard Santos (MAS)

Final
Syed Abdul Kadir (SIN)	PTS
Vanlal Dawla (BIR)

=== Flyweight (51 kg) ===
Semifinals
Thet Oo Lay (BIR)	PTS
Chhom Chhay (KHM)
Chawalit On-Chim (THA)	KO R2
Shariff bin Ali (MAS)

Final
Thet Oo Lay (BIR)	PTS
Chawalit On-Chim (THA)

=== Bantamweight (54 kg) ===
Quarterfinals
Soonthahin Sunai (THA)	PTS
Chin Kwee Siew (MAS)

Semifinals
Win Maung (BIR)	PTS
Soonthahin Sunai (THA)
Phar Khong (KHM)	PTS
Cyril Jeeris (SIN)

Final
Win Maung (BIR)	PTS
Phar Khong (KHM)

=== Featherweight (57 kg) ===
Quarterfinals
G. Thanabal (SIN)	PTS
Ros Savang (KHM)

Semifinals
Sann Myint (BIR)	PTS
Bootpet Nil (THA)
G. Thanabal (SIN)	PTS
Baharom Ahmad (MAS)

Final
Sann Myint (BIR)	RSC R2
G. Thanabal (SIN)

=== Lightweight (60 kg) ===
Semifinals
Sawart Wongkaew (THA)	KO R2
Ismail bin Darus (SIN)
Soth Sun (KHM)	PTS
Chan Kin Ho (MAS)

Final
Sawart Wongkaew (THA)	PTS
Soth Sun (KHM)

=== Light welterweight (63.5 kg) ===
Semifinals
Bantow Srisook (THA)	RSC R1
Chhay Savath (KHM)
Hashim Masud (SIN)	PTS
Suaner Sain (MAS)

Final
Bantow Srisook (THA)	KO R2
Hashim Masud (SIN)

=== Welterweight (67 kg) ===
Final
Virat Vilarlak (THA)	KO R2
Tobias Totu (MAS)

=== Light middleweight (71 kg) ===
Semifinals
Rabieb Sangnual (THA)	KO R1
Long Savoen (KHM)
Ni Ni (BIR)	KO R1
Kadir Hussain (MAS)

Final
Rabieb Sangnual (THA)	KO R1
Ni Ni (BIR)

=== Middleweight (75 kg) ===
Final
Pratarn Term (THA)	KO R1
Rahim Farid (MAS)
