= Georgi Kostadinov =

Bulgarian boxer (born 1950)

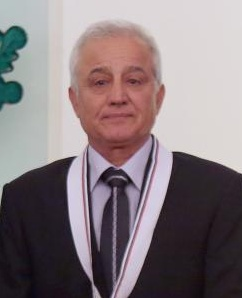

Medal record

Men's boxing

Representing Bulgaria

Olympic Games
Gold medal – first place	1972 Munich	Flyweight

Georgi Kostadinov (born 16 January 1950) is a former boxer from Bulgaria. He competed at the 1972 Summer Olympics and the 1976 Summer Olympics.

== Amateur career ==
Georgi Kostadinov won the Olympic flyweight gold medal at the 1972 Munich Olympic Games for Bulgaria. His results were:

- Round of 64: bye
- Round of 32: Defeated Jan Balouch (Pakistan) TKO 2
- Round of 16: Defeated Chris Ius (Canada) by decision, 5–0
- Quarterfinal: Defeated Calixto Perez (Colombia) by decision, 3–2
- Semifinal: Defeated Leszek Błażyński (Poland) by decision, 5–0
- Final: Defeated Leo Rwabwogo (Uganda) by decision, 5–0 (won gold medal)
