= Boxing at the 1973 SEAP Games =

Boxing at the 1973 Southeast Asian Peninsular Games
- Venue: Kentonmen Reserve Police Station
- Date: 4–7 September
- Competitors: 36 from 6 nations

The Boxing at the 1973 SEAP Games was held between 4 and 7 September at Kentonmen Reserve Police Station, Queenstown.

== Participating countries ==
- Burma
- Khmer Republic
- Malaysia
- Singapore (Host)
- Thailand
- South Vietnam

== Medal table ==
Rank	Nation	Gold	Silver	Bronze	Total
1	Thailand (THA)	8	0	1	9
2	Singapore (SIN)*	1	4	4	9
3	Burma (BIR)	0	3	1	4
4	Khmer Republic (KHM)	0	1	3	4
4	Malaysia (MAS)	0	1	3	4
6	South Vietnam (VNM)	0	0	1	1
Totals (6 entries)		9	9	13	31

== Medalists ==
Event	Gold	Silver	Bronze
Light flyweight (48 kg)	Prathorn Likhasit; Thailand	Syed Abdul Kadir; Singapore	Phạm Văn Quyến; South Vietnam
Light flyweight (48 kg)	Prathorn Likhasit; Thailand	Syed Abdul Kadir; Singapore	Tin Shwe; Burma
Flyweight (51 kg)	Maitri Netmanee; Thailand	Vanlal Dawla; Burma	Ahmad Majid; Malaysia
Flyweight (51 kg)	Maitri Netmanee; Thailand	Vanlal Dawla; Burma	Tan Suan Ngoh; Singapore
Bantamweight (54 kg)	Dorn Namvichit; Thailand	Zulkifli Hassan; Malaysia	Phar Khong; Khmer Republic
Bantamweight (54 kg)	Dorn Namvichit; Thailand	Zulkifli Hassan; Malaysia	Mohamed Ramdzan; Singapore
Featherweight (57 kg)	Cyril Jeeris; Singapore	Ye Aung; Burma	Soth Sun; Khmer Republic
Featherweight (57 kg)	Cyril Jeeris; Singapore	Ye Aung; Burma	Suparb Srisuvan; Thailand
Lightweight (60 kg)	Chalermchai Dumkum; Thailand	D. Loganathan; Singapore	Chhay Savath; Khmer Republic
Light welterweight (63.5 kg)	Vichit Praianan; Thailand	Aung Myint; Burma	Hashim Masud; Singapore
Light welterweight (63.5 kg)	Vichit Praianan; Thailand	Aung Myint; Burma	Rahmad Razali; Malaysia
Welterweight (67 kg)	Boonsong Mansri; Thailand	Long Savoem; Khmer Republic	Chan Kin Ho; Malaysia
Welterweight (67 kg)	Boonsong Mansri; Thailand	Long Savoem; Khmer Republic	Shaul Hameed; Singapore
Light middleweight (71 kg)	Rabieb Sangnual; Thailand	Tay Ek Phlow; Singapore	—N/a
Middleweight (75 kg)	Prajak Hirunrat; Thailand	Mutuhusamy Selveekam; Singapore	—N/a

== Results ==
=== Light flyweight (48 kg) ===
Quarterfinals
Phạm Văn Quyến (VNM)	PTS
Bernard Santos (MAS)

Semifinals
Prathorn Likhasit (THA)	PTS
Phạm Văn Quyến (VNM)
Syed Abdul Kadir (SIN)	PTS
Tin Shwe (BIR)

Final
Prathorn Likhasit (THA)	PTS
Syed Abdul Kadir (SIN)

=== Flyweight (51 kg) ===
Semifinals
Maitri Netmanee (THA)	RSC R1
Ahmad Majid (MAS)
Vanlal Dawla (BIR)	KO R1
Tan Suan Ngoh (SIN)

Final
Maitri Netmanee (THA)	KO R2
Vanlal Dawla (BIR)

=== Bantamweight (54 kg) ===
Quarterfinals
Dorn Namvichit (THA)	PTS
Win Maung (BIR)
Phar Khong (KHM)	KO R1
Nguyen Tien Truong (VNM)

Semifinals
Dorn Namvichit (THA)	KO R1
Phar Khong (KHM)
Zulkifli Hassan (MAS)	PTS
Mohamed Ramdzan (SIN)

Final
Dorn Namvichit (THA)	KO R1
Zulkifli Hassan (MAS)

=== Featherweight (57 kg) ===
Quarterfinals
Cyril Jeeris (SIN)	KO R1
Vũ Văn Thanh (VNM)

Semifinals
Soth Sun (KHM)
Cyril Jeeris (SIN)	PTS
Ye Aung (BIR)	PTS
Suparb Srisuvan (THA)

Final
Cyril Jeeris (SIN)	PTS
Ye Aung (BIR)

=== Lightweight (60 kg) ===
Semifinals
Chalermchai Dumkum (THA)	PTS
Chhay Savath (KHM)

Final
D. Loganathan (SIN)
Chalermchai Dumkum (THA)	PTS

=== Light welterweight (63.5 kg) ===
Semifinals
Vichit Praianan (THA)	PTS
Hashim Masud (SIN)
Aung Myint (BIR)	PTS
Rahmad Razali (MAS)

Final
Vichit Praianan (THA)	PTS
Aung Myint (BIR)

=== Welterweight (67 kg) ===
Semifinals
Boonsong Mansri (THA)	KO R1
Chan Kin Ho (MAS)
Long Savoem (KHM)	PTS
Shaul Hameed (SIN)

Final
Boonsong Mansri (THA)	KO R1
Long Savoem (KHM)

=== Light middleweight (71 kg) ===
Final
Rabieb Sangnual (THA)	KO R1
Tay Ek Phlow (SIN)

=== Middleweight (75 kg) ===
Final
Prajak Hirunrat (THA)	PTS
Mutuhusamy Selveekam (SIN)
