= Maurice O'Sullivan (boxer) =

British boxer

Personal information
- Full name: Maurice A. O'Sullivan
- Nationality: British (Welsh)
- Born: 4 December 1952 (age 73) Cardiff, Wales
- Height: 5 ft 3.5 in (1.61 m)

Sport
- Sport: Boxing

Maurice A. O'Sullivan (born 4 December 1952) is a British boxer. As a teenager, he won the Welsh Amateur Boxing Association title before being selected to represent Great Britain at the 1972 Summer Olympics in Munich. He won his first bout at the Games before suffering a defeat to eventual silver medallist, Ugandan Leo Rwabwogo.

== Career ==
Born in Cardiff, Wales, O'Sullivan represented Roath Youth Amateur Boxing Club. He was selected to represent Wales as a teenager and fought Johnny Owen in the 1974 Welsh Amateur Boxing Association Championship, winning a controversial judges' decision. O'Sullivan reportedly offered the trophy to Owen after the fight, although Owen refused to accept. He won the 1972 Amateur Boxing Association British flyweight title, when boxing out of the Roath Youth ABC.

O'Sullivan was chosen to represent Great Britain in the men's flyweight boxing event at the 1972 Summer Olympics in Munich. At the Games, he was drawn against Rabah Kaloufi of France in the first round. O'Sullivan won the bout via a judges decision, outscoring his opponent by three points. The second round of the competition was disrupted by the withdrawal of Argentine Jose Viccario following a fight in the Olympic Village. O'Sullivan would have drawn Japanese boxer Fujio Nagai, but instead faced Leo Rwabwogo of Uganda. Rwabwogo had won a bronze medal at the previous games, the 1968 Summer Olympics in Mexico, having reached the semi-finals of the competition. O'Sullivan was defeated in the first round when the referee stopped the contest after 1 minutes and 20 seconds. Rwabwogo floored O'Sullivan with a right hand; O'Sullivan returned to his feet but, when Rwabwogo struck another strong punch, the referee ended the bout. Rwabwogo went on to win the silver medal.
