= Leo Rwabwogo =

Ugandan boxer

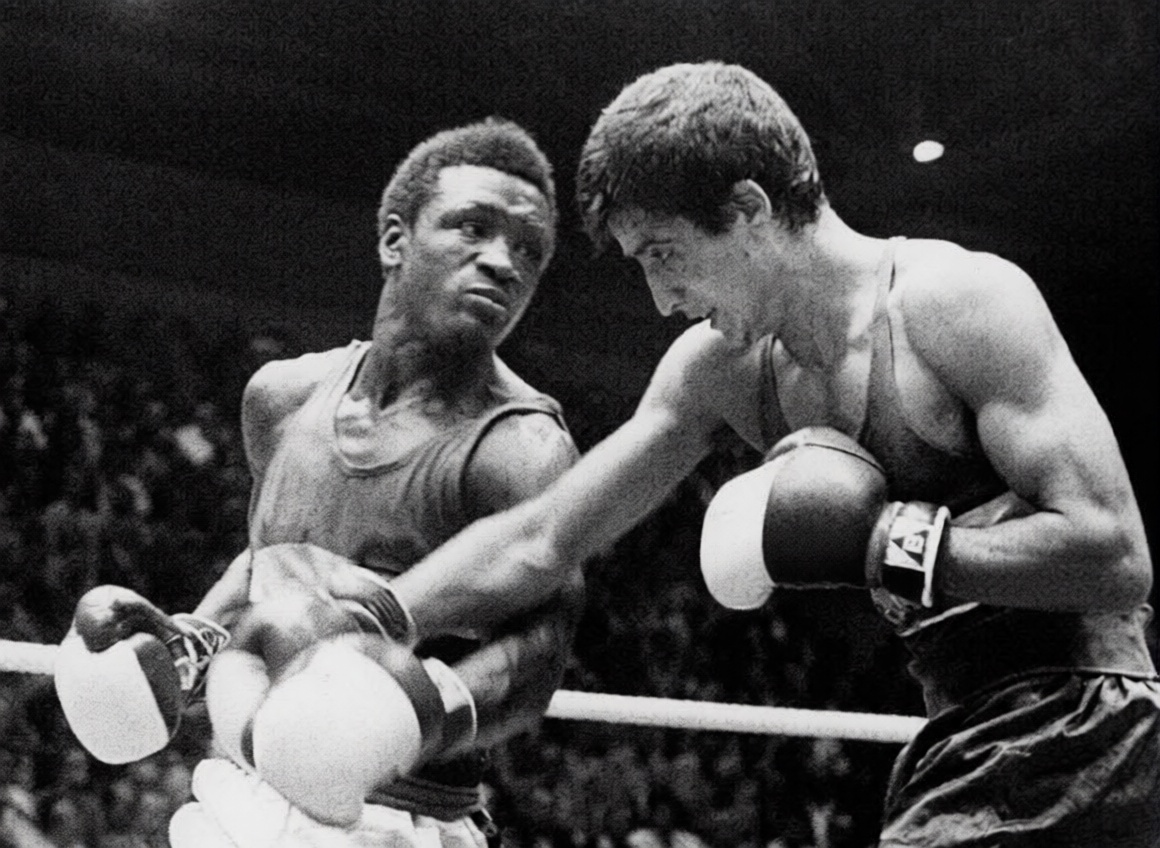
- Rwabwogo against Georgi Kostadinov of Bulgaria at the 1972 Munich Olympics.
- Born: June 3, 1949; Tororo, Uganda
- Died: January 14, 2009 (aged 59); Rugongo, Kabarole District
- Children: 12

Olympic medal record

Men's amateur boxing

Representing Uganda
Silver medal – second place	1972 Munich	Flyweight
Bronze medal – third place	1968 Mexico City	Flyweight

Commonwealth Games
Silver medal – second place	1970 Edinburgh	Flyweight

Leo Rwabwogo (3 June 1949 – 14 January 2009) was a Ugandan boxer, who won two Olympic medals during his career as an amateur in the flyweight division (up to 51 kg). He won a bronze medal at the 1968 Summer Olympics in Mexico City before winning a silver medal at the 1972 Summer Olympics in Munich. He also won a silver medal at the 1970 British Commonwealth Games in Edinburgh.

== Early life ==
Rwabwogo was born in Tororo, a town in the Eastern Region of Uganda. He took up boxing and joined the Kilembe Mines Boxing Center in the west of the country.

== Career ==
=== 1968 Olympics ===
Rwabwogo had claimed the African flyweight title in the 1960s and was selected as part of the Ugandan boxing team for the 1968 Summer Olympics in Mexico City. He was drawn against South Korean Seo Sang-yeong in his debut fight in the Olympics, winning a unanimous 5–0 decision. Further decision victories over American David Vasquez and Hungarian Tibor Badari followed, winning both 3–2, advanced Rwabwogo to the semi-final. Rwabwogo met Polish fighter Artur Olech who had won the silver medal in the event four years earlier at the 1964 Summer Olympics. The experienced Olech proved too strong for Rwabwogo, winning the fight in a 4–1 decision. Despite his defeat, Rwabwogo won the bronze medal in the event. He became the second athlete to win an Olympic medal in the nation's history, his teammate Eridadi Mukwanga had also guaranteed himself a medal two days earlier in the bantamweight division. Rwabwogo was however the first to receive his medal as Mukwanga had advanced in his weight class. Mukwanga went on to win the silver medal after losing the final.

=== 1972 Olympics ===
At the 1970 British Commonwealth Games, Rwabwogo won the silver medal after losing to Englishman Dave Needham. He was chosen to represent Uganda again at the 1972 Summer Olympics in Munich, winning his first round bout over Uruguayan Jorge Acuña by a 5–0 decision. He recorded his first TKO victory in an Olympic event in the second round, stopping British fighter Maurice O'Sullivan. He recorded a decision victory over Thailand's Chawalit On-Chim before recording a second TKO victory of the tournament by stopping Irishman Neil McLaughlin in the quarter-final.

Having lost in the semi-finals four years earlier, Rwabwogo went one better in the 1972 games by defeating Cuban fighter Douglas Rodriguez in a 3–2 decision victory to reach the flyweight final. Rwabwogo met Bulgarian Georgi Kostadinov in the gold medal match on 10 September. Kostadinov was the stronger in the first two rounds but, in the third, Rwabwogo mounted a "heavy counter-offensive" in an attempt to recover. However, Kostadinov held out to win the gold, with Rwabwogo claiming silver. Rwabwogo's trainer would later claim that an injured right hand had impeded his fight and denied him victory.

By winning silver, Rwabwogo became the only Ugandan athlete to win more than one Olympic medal in the nation's history. He is also one of only three fighters to have won more than one medal at flyweight in Olympic history, alongside Artur Olech of Poland and Bulat Zhumadilov of Kazakhstan. His silver medal victory briefly tied him with Mukwanga for Uganda's highest placed finish at an Olympic event until hurdler John Akii-Bua claimed the nation's first ever gold medal days later.

== Later life ==
Rwabwogo was offered the chance to turn professional in the United States following the 1972 games but was persuaded to remain in Uganda by officials from that nation. After retiring from fighting, he took up other roles within boxing, coaching other fighters and becoming a referee.

He remained in Kilembe, taking up a role as a sports officer at Kilembe Mines, the same club he had boxed at as a teenager. In 1981, Rwabwogo was a campaigner for Crispus Kiyonga and became a member of the National Resistance Movement. He ended his life working as a peasant farmer in relative poverty. He died while tending his garden in the village of Rugongo in the Kabarole District at the age of 59 in 2008, leaving behind 12 children. The poverty stricken nature of Rwabwogo's death caused shock in Uganda. A fundraising drive raised USh 1,100,000/= and included the donation of 50 metal sheets and two acres of land to construct a home for Rwabwogo's family.
