= Boxing at the 1976 Summer Olympics – Heavyweight =

Olympic boxing tournament

Heavyweight boxing at the Games of the XXI Olympiad
- Venue: Maurice Richard Arena, Montreal
- Dates: 22–31 July 1976
- Competitors: 15 from 15 nations

Medalists
| 1st place, gold medalist(s) | | Teófilo Stevenson | Cuba |
| 2nd place, silver medalist(s) | | Mircea Şimon | Romania |
| 3rd place, bronze medalist(s) | | Clarence Hill | Bermuda |
| 3rd place, bronze medalist(s) | | John Tate | United States |

The men's heavyweight event was part of the boxing programme at the 1976 Summer Olympics. The weight class allowed boxers of more than 81 kilograms to compete. The competition was held from 22 to 31 July 1976. 15 boxers from 15 nations competed.

== Medalists ==
| Gold | Teófilo Stevenson; Cuba |
| Silver | Mircea Şimon; Romania |
| Bronze | Clarence Hill; Bermuda |
| Bronze | John Tate; United States |

== Results ==
The following boxers took part in the event:

| Rank | Name | Country |
|---|---|---|
| 1 | Teófilo Stevenson | Cuba |
| 2 | Mircea Şimon | Romania |
| 3T | Clarence Hill | Bermuda |
| 3T | John Tate | United States |
| 5T | Peter Hussing | West Germany |
| 5T | Rudy Gauwe | Belgium |
| 5T | Pekka Ruokola | Finland |
| 5T | Atanas Sapundzhiev | Bulgaria |
| 9T | Andrzej Biegalski | Poland |
| 9T | Mamadou Drame | Senegal |
| 9T | Parviz Badpa | Iran |
| 9T | Trevor Berbick | Jamaica |
| 9T | László Pákozdi | Hungary |
| 9T | Viktor Ivanov | Soviet Union |
| 15T | Jürgen Fanghänel | East Germany |

=== First round ===
- Atanas Suvandzhiev (BUL) def. Mahmoud Ahmed Ali (EGY), walk-over
- Viktor Ivanov (URS) def. Jürgen Fanghänel (GDR), 3:2

=== Second round ===
- John Tate (USA) def. Andrzej Biegalski (POL), 5:0
- Peter Hussing (FRG) def. Lászlo Pakózdi (HUN), 5:0
- Teófilo Stevenson (CUB) def. Mamadou Drame (SNG), KO-2
- Pekka Ruokola (FIN) def. Solomon Ataga (NGA), walk-over
- Clarence Hill (BER) def. Parviz Badpa (IRN), KO-3
- Raudy Gauwe (BEL) def. Eric George (VIS), walk-over
- Mircea Şimon (ROM) def. Trevor Berbick (JAM), 5:0
- Atanas Suvandzhiev (BUL) def. Viktor Ivanov (URS), 4:1

=== Quarterfinals ===
- John Tate (USA) def. Peter Hussing (FRG), 3:2
- Teófilo Stevenson (CUB) def. Pekka Ruokola (FIN), KO-1
- Clarence Hill (BER) def. Rudy Gauwe (BEL), 5:0
- Mircea Şimon (ROM) def. Atanas Suvandzhiev (BUL), 4:1

=== Semifinals ===
- Teófilo Stevenson (CUB) def. John Tate (USA), KO-1
- Mircea Şimon (ROM) def. Clarence Hill (BER), 5:0

=== Final ===
- Teófilo Stevenson (CUB) def. Mircea Şimon (ROM), AB-3
