= Boxing at the 1975 SEAP Games =

Boxing events in Bangkok

Boxing at the 1975 Southeast Asian Peninsular Games
- Date: 10–14 December
- Competitors: 19 from 4 nations

Boxing is one of the 18 sports featured in the 1975 Southeast Asian Peninsular Games held from 10 to 14 December 1975. Due to only four countries participating in this event, all athletes were already assured of medals.

== Participating countries ==
- Burma
- Malaysia
- Singapore
- Thailand (Host)

== Medal table ==
* Host nation (Thailand)

Rank	Nation	Gold	Silver	Bronze	Total
1	Thailand (THA)*	5	1	0	6
2	Burma (BIR)	1	2	2	5
3	Malaysia (MAS)	1	0	1	2
4	Singapore (SIN)	0	4	2	6
Totals (4 entries)		7	7	5	19

== Medalists ==
Event	Gold	Silver	Bronze
Light flyweight (48 kg)	Tada Manasirmwong; Thailand	Syed Abdul Kadir; Singapore	Salim Abdul Rahim; Malaysia
Light flyweight (48 kg)	Tada Manasirmwong; Thailand	Syed Abdul Kadir; Singapore	Thet Oo Lay; Burma
Flyweight (51 kg)	Narong Pimpawan; Thailand	Saw Aung Kyi; Burma	Ramamoorthi Rathakrishnan; Singapore
Bantamweight (54 kg)	Boonsong Prempree; Thailand	Moe Wai; Burma	Apbai Naidu Varathan; Singapore
Featherweight (57 kg)	Osman Syed Azam; Malaysia	Vellasamy Karunaniai; Singapore	—N/a
Lightweight (60 kg)	Harah Khan; Burma	Sompat Kerdcharoen; Thailand	—N/a
Welterweight (66 kg)	Buddaluk Chaopoo; Thailand	Selveekam Muthusamy; Singapore	—N/a
Light middleweight (70 kg)	Ongard Kamtchard; Thailand	Krishnan Kunjuraman; Singapore	Ni Ni; Burma

== Results ==
=== Light flyweight (48 kg) ===
Semifinals
Tada Manasirmwong (THA)	RSC R1
Salim Abdul Rahim (MAS)
Syed Abdul Kadir (SIN)	RSC R3
Thet Oo Lay (BIR)

Final
Tada Manasirmwong (THA)	PTS
Syed Abdul Kadir (SIN)

=== Flyweight (51 kg) ===
Semifinals
Saw Aung Kyi (BIR)	PTS
Ramamoorthi Rathakrishnan (SIN)

Final
Narong Pimpawan (THA)	TKO R2
Saw Aung Kyi (BIR)

=== Bantamweight (54 kg) ===
Semifinals
Moe Wai (BIR)	PTS
Apbai Naidu Varathan (SIN)

Final
Boonsong Prempree (THA)	PTS
Moe Wai (BIR)

=== Featherweight (57 kg) ===
Final
Osman Syed Azam (MAS)	PTS
Vellasamy Karunaniai (SIN)

=== Lightweight (60 kg) ===
Final
Harah Khan (BIR)	PTS
Sompat Kerdcharoen (THA)

=== Welterweight (66 kg) ===
Final
Buddaluk Chaopoo (THA)	PTS
Selveekam Muthusamy (SIN)

=== Light middleweight (70 kg) ===
Semifinals
Ongard Kamtchard (THA)	PTS
Ni Ni (BIR)

Final
Krishnan Kunjuraman (SIN)
Ongard Kamtchard (THA)	PTS
