= Gerd Schubert =

German boxer

Personal information
- Nationality: German
- Born: 15 July 1943 (age 81); Berlin, Germany
- Died: 02/2022

Sport
- Sport: Boxing

Gerd Schubert (born 15 July 1943) is a German boxer. He competed in the men's flyweight event at the 1972 Summer Olympics. At the 1972 Summer Olympics he lost to Chawalit On-Chim of Thailand.
