= Salvador Miranda =

Salvador Miranda may refer to:

- Salvador Miranda (boxer) (born 1949), Nicaraguan boxer
- Salvador Miranda (historian) (1939-2024), Cuban-American church historian and librarian
- Salvador Miranda (runner) (born 1971), Mexican runner
