= Tambwe =

Tambwe is a surname. Notable people with the surname include:

- Amissi Tambwe (born 1988), Burundian footballer
- Aristot Tambwe-Kasengele (born 2004), Congolese footballer
- Madosh Tambwe (born 1997), South African rugby player
- Patiyo Tambwe (born 1984), Congolese footballer
- Patrick Tambwé (born 1975), Congolese-born French long-distance runner
- Saidi Tambwe (born 1952), Tanzanian footballer
