= Neil McLaughlin =

Irish boxer

Personal information
- Nationality: Irish
- Born: 10 May 1948 Derry, Northern Ireland
- Died: 23 December 2013 (aged 65) Derry, Northern Ireland
- Height: 5 ft 4.5 in (1.64 m)
- Weight: Bantamweight, flyweight

Boxing career
- Stance: Orthodox

Boxing record
- Total fights: 28
- Wins: 5
- Win by KO: 3
- Losses: 20
- Draws: 3
- No contests: 0

Neil McLaughlin (10 May 1948 – 23 December 2013) was an Irish professional boxer. As an amateur, he won several regional and national titles, including winning the All-Ireland title in 1971 and 1972. He won a bronze medal at the 1971 European Amateur Boxing Championships before competing in the men's flyweight event at the 1972 Summer Olympics, where he reached the quarter-finals.

He turned professional in 1976 and won the Northern Irish bantamweight title the following year after stopping Terry Hanna in the fifth round. However, he lost the title in his first defense against Davy Larmour in 1978. He later unsuccessfully challenged for the Commonwealth flyweight title before fighting for the last time in 1982. He also became involved in politics with Sinn Féin and was present at the events of Bloody Sunday in 1972.

== Early life ==
Neil McLaughlin was born in the Bogside area of Derry, Northern Ireland. He developed an interest in gymnastics and hoped to take on the sport full time until a disagreement with a coach at his club led him to quit.

== Amateur career ==
On the advice of a friend, he instead attended St. Eugene's Boxing Club and quickly proved himself adept at boxing, later stating that he fell into the sport "by mistake". He won schoolboy boxing titles at regional and national levels before being selected to represent Ireland for the first time in 1969, travelling to Dundee for a meeting with Scotland. He competed in the 1971 European Amateur Boxing Championships in Madrid, where he was one of three Irish boxers to claim a bronze medal, and won his first All-Ireland title the same year. He would retain the title the following year and was also chosen to compete in the men's flyweight event at the 1972 Summer Olympics in Munich.

At the games, McLaughlin recorded a points victory over Sudanese fighter Mohamed Abakkar in the first round before receiving a bye in the second. In the third round, he met Egyptian fighter Mohamed Selim Soheim, stopping his opponent in the second round. He was defeated by eventual silver medalist, Ugandan Leo Rwabwogo in the quarter-finals.

== Professional career ==
McLaughlin turned professional in January 1976, losing his debut fight on points to Welshman George Sutton. He recorded his first win in his following fight, with a victory over Tony Kerr but would lose a rematch to the Scotsman two months later. In November 1976, during the height of The Troubles, he met Welshman Johnny Owen at the Templemore Sports Complex. The card suffered several interruptions; there were angry outbursts when British soldiers entered the arena, a bomb threat was phoned in threatening the site and, during the bout, the lights failed for several minutes. The fight ended in a controversial draw.

McLaughlin would meet Owen again in his next fight, a rematch held in West Bromwich in January 1977, where he suffered an 80–76 points defeat. Owen had hoped to challenge George Sutton for the Welsh bantamweight championship but his request was denied by the Welsh Area Boxing Council. The delay left Owen short of an opponent and a third meeting with McLaughlin was arranged for the following month, where McLaughlin suffered a second points defeat to the Welshman. He met Dave Smith in consecutive fights later in the year, drawing the first before suffering a defeat in the second.

In July 1977, McLaughlin met Terry Hanna for the vacant Northern Irish bantamweight title, stopping his opponent in the fifth round to claim the belt. Three months later, he fought Charlie Magri in the Englishman's debut professional bout but suffered a second round knockout. McLaughlin did not fight again for nearly a year, winning his next bout against Ian Murray in June 1978 before suffering a defeat to Gary Davidson soon after. In October 1978, he lost his Northern Irish title in his first defense against Davy Larmour. The pair had met five times as amateurs in the early 1970s and had developed mutual respect for one another. Larmour ultimately went on to win the bout on points.

McLaughlin recorded victories over Mohammed Younis and Pip Coleman at the start of 1979. He faced Johnny Owen again at the end of the year, losing again, before unsuccessfully challenging Nigerian Ray Amoo for the Commonwealth flyweight championship in 1980. He continued to fight until 1982; his last bout was a knockout defeat against Ivor Jones in June of that year.

== Later life ==
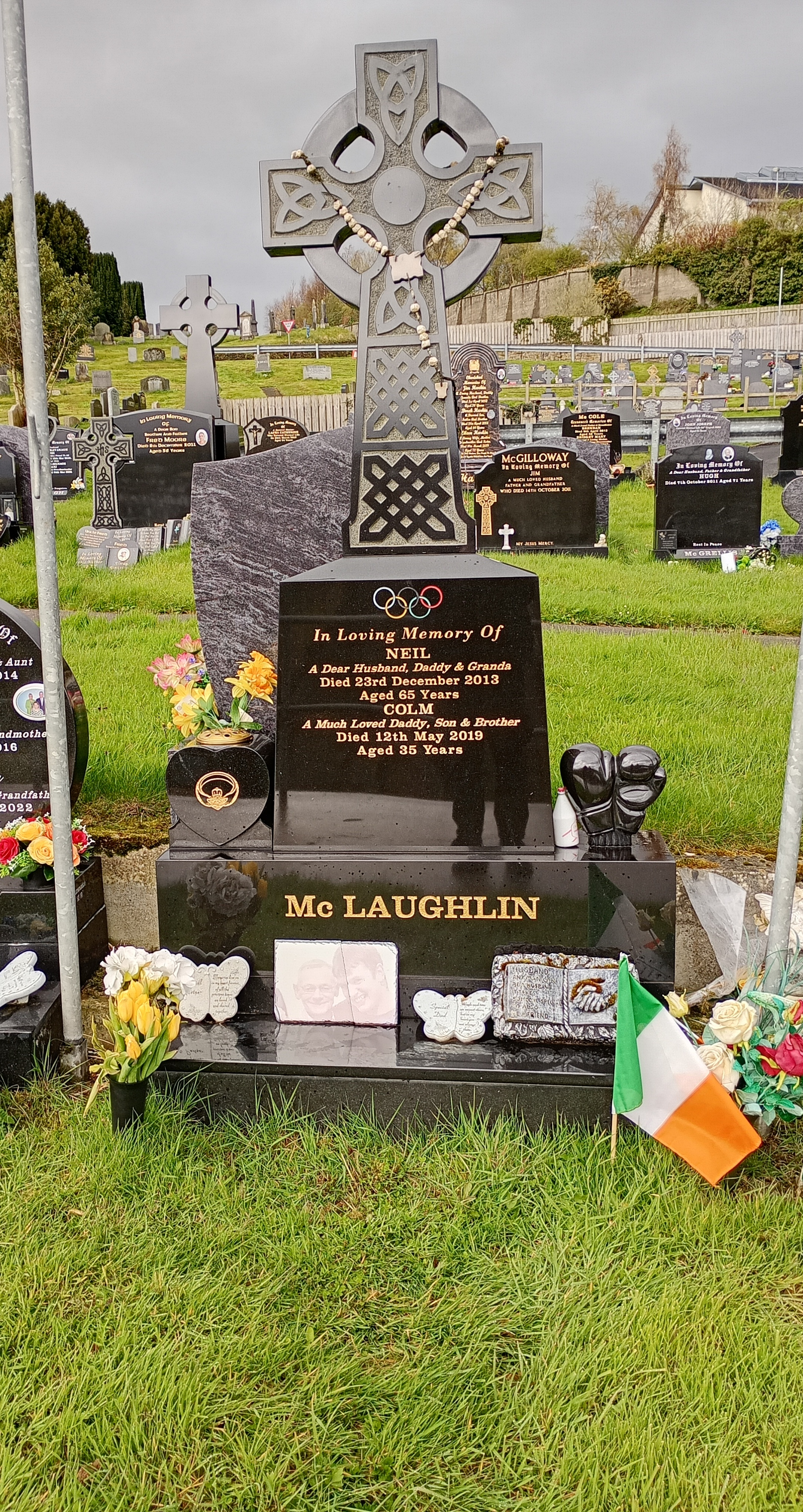
McLaughlin's grave in Derry City Cemetery

McLaughlin became involved in local politics in later life and was one of the founding members of the Sinn Féin Cumann in Shantallow. In 1972, he was present during the events in the Bogside area that became known as Bloody Sunday. During a tribunal, McLaughlin testified how British paratroopers had fired at him and a group of around 20 others who had thrown stones at British Army vehicles.

McLaughlin married his partner Margo and had seven children. One of his children, Neil Jr, has also stood as a local council candidate for Sinn Féin. McLaughlin died on 23 December 2013 and was buried in Derry City Cemetery.
