= Franco Udella =

Italian boxer (born 1947)

Personal information
- Nationality: Italian
- Born: Franco Udella; 25 February 1947 (age 79) Cagliari, Italy
- Height: 5 ft 0 in (152 cm)
- Weight: Flyweight; Light flyweight

Boxing career

Boxing record
- Total fights: 43
- Wins: 37
- Win by KO: 18
- Losses: 5
- Draws: 0
- No contests: 1

Franco Udella (born 25 February 1947 in Cagliari) is an Italian former world boxing champion.

== Amateur career ==
=== Olympic games results ===
1968 (as a Light flyweight)

- Lost to Alberto Morales (Mexico) 0–5

1972 (as a flyweight)

- 1st round bye
- Defeated Felix Maina (Kenya) 5–0
- Lost to Boris Zoriktuyev (Soviet Union) 1–4

== Pro career ==
Udella turned pro in 1972 and won the newly created WBC light flyweight title in 1975 with a disqualification win over Valentin Martinez in the 12th round. Udella was then stripped of the title in August 1975, for failing to defend against Paraguayan Rafael Lovera, who had never fought a professional fight. The following year he challenged WBC light flyweight world champion Luis Estaba, but lost by KO in the 3rd round. He never challenged for a major title again. He retired in 1979 after a loss to Charlie Magri for the EBU (European) flyweight title.

== Professional boxing record ==
| 43 fights | 37 wins | 5 losses |
|---|---|---|
| By knockout | 18 | 3 |
| By decision | 18 | 1 |
| By disqualification | 1 | 1 |
| No contests | 1 | |

| No. | Result | Record | Opponent | Type | Round, time | Date | Location | Notes |
|---|---|---|---|---|---|---|---|---|
| 43 | Loss | 37–5 (1) | Charlie Magri | SD | 12 | May 1, 1979 | Empire Pool, London, England, UK | Lost European flyweight title |
| 42 | Win | 37–4 (1) | Manuel Carrasco | UD | 15 | Nov 15, 1978 | Bellaria, Italy | Retained European flyweight title |
| 41 | Win | 36–4 (1) | Mariano Garcia | TKO | 6 (15) | May 24, 1978 | Cagliari, Italy | Retained European flyweight title |
| 40 | Win | 35–4 (1) | Emilio Pireddu | PTS | 15 | Dec 23, 1977 | Cagliari, Italy | Retained European flyweight title |
| 39 | Win | 34–4 (1) | Nessim Zebelini | TKO | 9 (15) | Oct 26, 1977 | Vigevano, Italy | Retained European flyweight title |
| 38 | Win | 33–4 (1) | Antonio Luis Franca | PTS | 8 | Sep 28, 1977 | Fort Village, Cagliari, Italy | |
| 37 | Win | 32–4 (1) | Antonio Luis Franca | PTS | 8 | Aug 21, 1977 | Rijeka, Czechoslovakia | |
| 36 | Win | 31–4 (1) | Jose Cantero | KO | 5 (15) | Jun 10, 1977 | Palasport di San Siro, Milan, Italy | Retained European flyweight title |
| 35 | Win | 30–4 (1) | Fernando Bernardez | TKO | 4 (10) | Feb 6, 1977 | Cagliari, Italy | |
| 34 | Win | 29–4 (1) | Pedro Molledo | PTS | 10 | Dec 3, 1976 | Milan, Italy | |
| 33 | Win | 28–4 (1) | Dominique Cesari | PTS | 10 | Oct 29, 1976 | Cagliari, Italy | |
| 32 | Loss | 27–4 (1) | Luis Estaba | KO | 3 (15) | Jul 18, 1976 | El Poliedro, Caracas, Venezuela | For WBC light flyweight title |
| 31 | Win | 27–3 (1) | Franco Sperati | TKO | 8 (15) | Jun 12, 1976 | S. Teresa di Gallura, Italy | |
| 30 | Win | 26–3 (1) | Jacky Bihin | TKO | 7 (10) | Apr 30, 1976 | Cagliari, Italy | |
| 29 | Win | 25–3 (1) | Jerry Strickland | TKO | 3 (8) | Mar 26, 1976 | Cagliari, Italy | |
| 28 | Win | 24–3 (1) | Robert Emerson | TKO | 3 (8) | Mar 5, 1976 | Sassari, Italy | |
| 27 | Win | 23–3 (1) | Fritz Chervet | UD | 15 | Jan 14, 1976 | Campione d'Italia, Italy | Retained European flyweight title |
| 26 | Win | 22–3 (1) | Daniel Figueroa | TKO | 4 (10) | Nov 29, 1975 | Cagliari, Italy | |
| 25 | Win | 21–3 (1) | Christian Martin | TKO | 6 (10) | Nov 14, 1975 | Milan, Italy | |
| 24 | NC | 20–3 (1) | Fritz Chervet | NC | 2 (15) | May 31, 1975 | Zurich, Switzerland | European flyweight title at stake |
| 23 | Win | 20–3 | Valentin Martinez | DQ | 12 (15), 2:56 | Apr 4, 1975 | Stadio San Siro, Milan, Italy | Won inaugural WBC light flyweight title |
| 22 | Win | 19–3 | Heriberto Mascarell | PTS | 10 | Feb 1, 1975 | Palazzetto dello Sport, Cagliari, Italy | |
| 21 | Win | 18–3 | Willie Pastrana | TKO | 4 (10) | Dec 6, 1974 | Milan, Italy | |
| 20 | Win | 17–3 | Pedro Molledo | TKO | 5 (15), 2:09 | Oct 25, 1974 | Palazzo dello Sport (Pad. 3 Fiera), Milan, Italy | Won vacant European flyweight title |
| 19 | Loss | 16–3 | Betulio González | TKO | 10 (15), 2:09 | Jul 20, 1974 | Stadio Darsena, Lignano Sabbiadoro, Italy | For WBC flyweight title |
| 18 | Win | 16–2 | Rino Ferrari | TKO | 4 (8) | Jun 7, 1974 | Milan, Italy | Injury |
| 17 | Win | 15–2 | Altero Marini | KO | 1 (8) | Apr 19, 1974 | Milan, Italy | |
| 16 | Win | 14–2 | Fernando Gabino | PTS | 8 | Apr 5, 1974 | Milan, Italy | |
| 15 | Win | 13–2 | Altero Marini | PTS | 8 | Feb 28, 1974 | Cagliari, Italy | |
| 14 | Loss | 12–2 | Altero Marini | DQ | 3 (8) | Feb 1, 1974 | Milan, Italy | |
| 13 | Win | 12–1 | Fernando Gabino | PTS | 8 | Dec 28, 1973 | Cagliari, Italy | |
| 12 | Win | 11–1 | Pedro Molledo | PTS | 10 | Nov 30, 1973 | Milan, Italy | |
| 11 | Win | 10–1 | Dominique Cesari | PTS | 8 | Oct 19, 1973 | Milan, Italy | |
| 10 | Win | 9–1 | Pedro de la Torre | TKO | 5 (8) | Sep 28, 1973 | Milan, Italy | |
| 9 | Win | 8–1 | Grazietto Soro | PTS | 6 | Sep 14, 1973 | Monza, Italy | |
| 8 | Win | 7–1 | Filippo Belvedere | TKO | 5 (6) | Jul 12, 1973 | Milan, Italy | |
| 7 | Win | 6–1 | Kiko Garcia | PTS | 6 | May 11, 1973 | Milan, Italy | |
| 6 | Win | 5–1 | Antonio Galletta | KO | 3 (6) | May 1, 1973 | Cagliari, Italy | |
| 5 | Win | 4–1 | Grazietto Soro | PTS | 6 | Apr 4, 1973 | Cagliari, Italy | |
| 4 | Loss | 3–1 | Antonio Galletta | TKO | 2 (6) | Feb 8, 1973 | Milan, Italy | Injury |
| 3 | Win | 3–0 | Angelo D'Aleo | PTS | 6 | Jan 19, 1973 | Milan, Italy | |
| 2 | Win | 2–0 | Mohamed Ben Salah | KO | 2 (6) | Dec 29, 1972 | Cagliari, Italy | |
| 1 | Win | 1–0 | Ray Salami | PTS | 6 | Dec 4, 1972 | Bologna, Italy | |

== See also ==
- List of light-flyweight boxing champions

Achievements
| Inaugural Champion | WBC light flyweight champion 4 April 1975 – 29 August 1975; Stripped | Vacant Title next held by Luis Estaba |
