= 1977 Asian Amateur Boxing Championships =

Boxing competitions

1977 Asian Boxing Championships
- Host city: Jakarta, Indonesia
- Dates: 13–20 October 1977

The eighth edition of the Men's Asian Amateur Boxing Championships was held from October 13–20, 1977 in Jakarta, Indonesia.

== Medal summary ==
Event	Gold	Silver	Bronze
Light flyweight 48 kg	Koichi Koba; Japan	Herry Maitimu; Indonesia	Farid Salman; Iraq
Light flyweight 48 kg	Koichi Koba; Japan	Herry Maitimu; Indonesia	Abdul Halim; Bangladesh
Flyweight; 51 kg	Koki Ishii; Japan	Johny Riberu; Indonesia	Weera Wachariamnage; Thailand
Flyweight; 51 kg	Koki Ishii; Japan	Johny Riberu; Indonesia	Kim Yun-choi; North Korea
Bantamweight; 54 kg	Hwang Chul-soon; South Korea	Nasser Alibabaei; Iran	Cho Maneerassayakorn; Thailand
Bantamweight; 54 kg	Hwang Chul-soon; South Korea	Nasser Alibabaei; Iran	Jong Jo-ung; North Korea
Featherweight; 57 kg	Yu Jong-man; South Korea	Finai Ratanakun; Thailand	Ku Yong-jo; North Korea
Featherweight; 57 kg	Yu Jong-man; South Korea	Finai Ratanakun; Thailand	Jabbar Feli; Iran
Lightweight; 60 kg	Oh Young-sae; South Korea	Yukio Odagiri; Japan	Ryu Bun-hwa; North Korea
Lightweight; 60 kg	Oh Young-sae; South Korea	Yukio Odagiri; Japan	Muhammad Siddique; Pakistan
Light welterweight 63.5 kg	Syamsul Anwar Harahap; Indonesia	Katsuhiro Okubo; Japan	Yun Jon-bom; North Korea
Light welterweight 63.5 kg	Syamsul Anwar Harahap; Indonesia	Katsuhiro Okubo; Japan	Farouk Janjoun; Iraq
Welterweight; 67 kg	Hassan Ebrahimzadeh; Iran	Kim Ju-seok; South Korea	Toshiyuki Kado; Japan
Welterweight; 67 kg	Hassan Ebrahimzadeh; Iran	Kim Ju-seok; South Korea	Intisar Jabbar; Iraq
Light middleweight 71 kg	Mohammad Azarhazin; Iran	Frans Bonsapia; Indonesia	Salem Sabri; Iraq
Light middleweight 71 kg	Mohammad Azarhazin; Iran	Frans Bonsapia; Indonesia	Tadashi Mihara; Japan
Middleweight; 75 kg	Karim Samadi; Iran	Wiem Gommies; Indonesia	Siraj-ud-Din; Pakistan
Middleweight; 75 kg	Karim Samadi; Iran	Wiem Gommies; Indonesia	Jang Bong-mun; North Korea
Light heavyweight 81 kg	Benny Maniani; Indonesia	Masis Hambarsumian; Iran	Abdur Rauf Khan; Bangladesh
Light heavyweight 81 kg	Benny Maniani; Indonesia	Masis Hambarsumian; Iran	Iqbal Muhammad; Pakistan
Heavyweight +81 kg	Parviz Badpa; Iran	Hideharu Yoshimura; Japan	Krismanto; Indonesia
Heavyweight +81 kg	Parviz Badpa; Iran	Hideharu Yoshimura; Japan	Imtiaz Mahmood; Pakistan

== Medal table ==
Rank	Nation	Gold	Silver	Bronze	Total
1	Iran	4	2	1	7
2	South Korea	3	1	0	4
3	Indonesia	2	4	1	7
4	Japan	2	3	2	7
5	Thailand	0	1	2	3
6	North Korea	0	0	6	6
7	Iraq	0	0	4	4
7	Pakistan	0	0	4	4
9	Bangladesh	0	0	2	2
Totals (9 entries)		11	11	22	44
