= Masis Hambarsumian =

Iranian boxer (born 1951)

Masis Hambarsounian
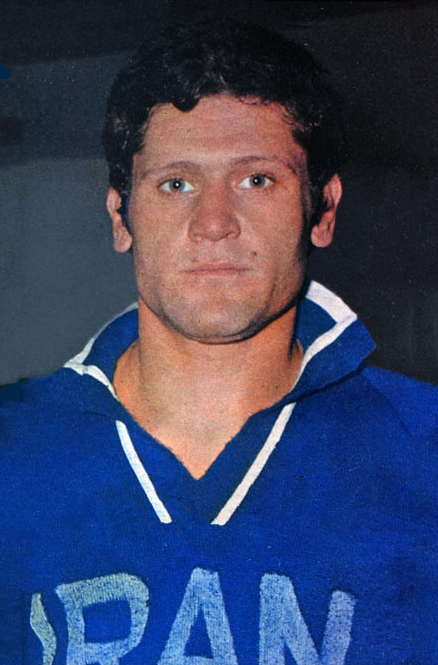
- Hambarsounian in 1974

Personal information
- Born: 3 June 1951 (age 75) Tehran, Iran

Sport
- Sport: Boxing
Medal record
Representing Iran
Asian Games
Gold medal – first place	1974 Tehran	81 kg
Asian Championships
Silver medal – second place	1973 Jakarta	81 kg
Bronze medal – third place	1977 Bangkok	81 kg
Bronze medal – third place	1980 Mumbai	81 kg

Masis Hambarsounian (Armenian: Մասիս ՀամբարՁումեան; Persian: ماسیس هامبارسونیان, born 3 June 1951) is a retired Iranian Armenian light-heavyweight boxer who won a gold medal at the 1974 Asian Games.
