= Luis Estaba =

Venezuelan boxer (1938–2025)

Personal information
- Nickname: Lumumba
- Nationality: Venezuelan
- Born: Luis Alberto Estaba; August 13, 1938 Güiria, Venezuela
- Died: February 16, 2025 (aged 86)
- Height: 5 ft 3 1/2 in (161 cm)
- Weight: Light flyweight

Boxing career
- Stance: Orthodox

Boxing record
- Total fights: 52
- Wins: 41
- Win by KO: 27
- Losses: 9
- Draws: 2
- No contests: 0

Luis Alberto Estaba (August 13, 1938 – February 16, 2025) was a Venezuelan boxer. Born in Güiria, he was nicknamed Lumumba, most commonly said to be because of his resemblance to Congolese leader Patrice Lumumba.

== Biography ==
A late starter into boxing, Estaba became a professional in 1967, at the relatively old (for boxing) age of 29. He beat Pedro Garcia by a knockout in one on February 28 of that year.

He kept his winning streak until losing a ten round decision to Natalio Jimenez in Caracas in 1968. He avenged that loss immediately by beating Jimenez in his next fight, by decision. After two more wins, he had his first fight abroad, when he lost to Jimenez, again by decision, at Santo Domingo.

On September 13, 1975, Estaba became boxing's second world champion ever in the Jr. Flyweight division, when he obtained the vacant WBC title by knocking out Rafael Lovera in the fourth round, who was making his professional debut during this world title bout. He defended the title 12 times, including victories over former or future world champions Franco Udella, Rafael Pedroza, and Netrnoi Sor Vorasingh. In 1977, he was named Venezuelan Athlete of the Year.

His luck ran out on February 19, 1978, when he lost the title to Mexico's Freddie Castillo by a knockout in round 14. After beating Ricardo Estupinan by a decision in 15 to win the Central American title in his division, he challenged Vorasingh (who had beaten Castillo) for the world title. Estaba lost by a knockout in five rounds on July 29, in what he knew would be his last fight as a professional, because local Venezuelan boxing laws ban anyone over 40 years old to box professionally, and Estaba turned 40 only two weeks after that fight.

Being forced into retirement, he left the sport of boxing with 41 wins, 9 losses and 2 draws, 27 wins having been by knockout.

Estaba died on February 16, 2025, at the age of 86.

== See also ==
- List of light-flyweight boxing champions
- List of Venezuelans

Achievements
Vacant Title last held by Franco Udella	WBC light flyweight champion September 13, 1975 – February 19, 1978	Succeeded by Freddy Castillo
