= Rabah Khaloufi =

French boxer

Personal information
- Nationality: French
- Born: 17 January 1943; Ouled Fayet, Algeria
- Died: 19 May 2014 (aged 71); Bordeaux, France

Sport
- Sport: Boxing

Rabah Khaloufi (17 January 1943 – 19 May 2014) was a French boxer. He competed in the men's flyweight event at the 1972 Summer Olympics. At the 1972 Summer Olympics, he lost to Maurice O'Sullivan of Great Britain.
