= George Dement =

American businessman and politician (1922–2014)

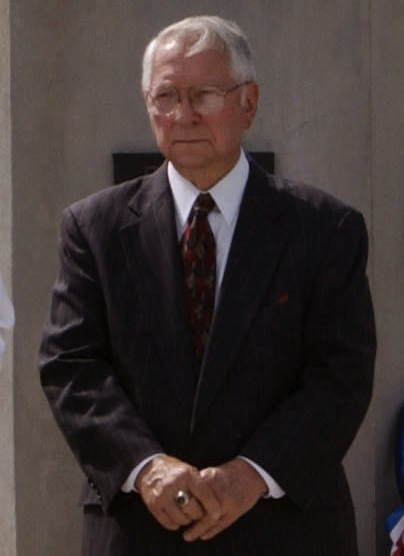
- Dement in 2002

14th Mayor of Bossier City, Louisiana
- In office 1989–2005
- Preceded by: Donald E. Jones
- Succeeded by: Lo Walker

Personal details
- Born: George Elyott Dement Jr. January 23, 1922 Princeton, Bossier Parish; Louisiana, USA
- Died: January 12, 2014 (aged 91) Frierson, DeSoto Parish; Louisiana
- Resting place: Evergreen Cemetery in Frierson
- Party: Democratic
- Spouse: Sunshine Norris Dement (married 1946-2011, her death)
- Children: Ann Dement Montes Steven G. Dement; Walter Edward Dement; David Glenn Dement (deceased) Timothy L. Dement
- Education: Centenary College of Louisiana
- Occupation: Restaurateur and innkeeper

Military service
- Branch/service: United States Navy
- Battles/wars: Pacific Theater of Operations of World War II; Present at Victory over Japan Day, September 2, 1945

George Elyott Dement Jr. (January 23, 1922 – January 12, 2014), was an American innkeeper and restaurateur who served from 1989 to 2005 as the thirteenth mayor of Bossier City, Louisiana.

== Background ==
Dement's parents were George Dement Sr. and the former Clara Catherine Depew. Employed by Gulf Oil, the senior Dement relocated in 1919 from Missouri to Bossier Parish in northwestern Louisiana. When Clara was giving birth to George Jr. with the assistance of a midwife, a mule crawled under their old farmhouse in the Princeton community in search of corn. The creature tried to stand and shook the floor while the baby was being brought forward.

Dement went to Arizona a year before he graduated from Elm Grove High School (pronounced ELEM Grove) in Bossier Parish. He then earned a dollar a day as a delivery boy for a Bossier City drugstore. Soon he was nearing completion of officer candidacy school in Corpus Christi, Texas, when he had a dispute with a lieutenant. Outraged, he joined the submarine section of the United States Navy during World War II on the USS Razorback (SS-394). The Razorback was nearly the last casualty of the Pacific war. Dement was present for the ceremony on Victory over Japan Day, September 2, 1945, when the Empire of Japan, under Emperor Hirohito surrendered to General Douglas MacArthur at Tokyo Bay. In 2004, the Razorback was moved to North Little Rock, Arkansas, as a display vessel, and Dement was there for the ceremony.

After five years in the military, Dement attended Methodist-affiliated Centenary College in Shreveport. At one time or another, Dement owned and operated fourteen restaurants in the Bossier City area, including "The Doghouse," where Elvis Presley ate in 1954, when he came to the Shreveport Municipal Auditorium for the Louisiana Hayride. By the late 1960s, faced with fast-food chain establishments in competition with his home-owned restaurants, Dement switched to hotels. He took over the management of a new Holiday Inn in Bossier City. Twice he was designated "Innkeeper of the World" for his work.

== Political career ==
In 1989, Dement was elected mayor as a Democrat, when the incumbent Donald Edward Jones, a former national president of the Junior Chamber International and a Bossier City businessman, did not seek reelection. Dement won second, third, and fourth terms in 1993, 1997, and in 2001. He retired on June 30, 2005, exactly sixteen years from his original inauguration into office. He was known for his leadership and accessibility to the public. He pushed for the Louisiana Boardwalk in downtown Bossier City and worked to revitalize key areas of the city.

According to the Bossier Press-Tribune, Dement "embraced riverboat gaming" which brought to Bossier City three casinos with the revenue to build the CenturyLink Center, Arthur Ray Teague Parkway, and the Benton Road Overpass. The leg work for some of the projects had begun in the Jones administration.

In 2005, U.S. Senator David Vitter, a Republican, paid tribute to Dement as "the people's mayor" on the occasion of Dement's retirement from office. Dement was succeeded by a former opponent, the Democrat-turned-Republican Lo Walker, who still holds the position, the first Republican in the seat. Prior to his own election to the office, Walker was the city's chief administrative officer and executive assistant to Mayor Dement.

In the nonpartisan blanket primary held on April 1, 1989, Dement led his three opponents with 4,845 votes (39.4 percent). The second-place candidate, fellow Democrat Wanda S. Bennett (born 1937), trailed with 3,405 votes (27.7 percent). Two other contenders, Democrat Lo Walker and Republican David H. Broussard followed with 2,072 votes (16.9 percent) and 1,978 votes (16.1 percent), respectively. In the second round of balloting four weeks later, Dement narrowly prevailed, 7,091 (51.8 percent) to Bennett's 6,596 (48.2 percent).

Dement was reelected in 1993 with 82 percent of the vote, in 1997 with 74.5 percent over two Republicans and a Democrat, and in 2001, with 57.2 percent over the Republican Jerry E. Harris and the Independent Billy Ross Robinson, a former city judge.

Dement is only the second mayor of Bossier City to have served four terms. Hoffman L. Fuller filled the position for sixteen terms from 1937 to 1953.

When Dement left office, the Mayor George Dement Endowed Fund for Bossier was established in his honor.

== Personal life ==
Dement was married to the former Sunshine Norris (1924-2011), a Shreveport native and one of two daughters of Steve Norris, a Bossier Parish sheriff's deputy, and the former Avis Wasson. Sunshine was homecoming queen at Bossier High School in 1942, when the players won the state football championship. She graduated in 1945 and like her husband attended Centenary College, where she obtained a bachelor's degree in education. She taught for twenty years for the Bossier Parish School Board at Bossier Elementary School and then became the first physical education teacher at Greenacres Junior High School in Bossier City.

George Dement met Sunshine when he was working as a soda jerk for $19 a week in a drug store. After the war, he was a higher-paid bartender, but Sunshine insisted that he leave that job, join the First Baptist Church of Bossier City, and enroll at Centenary College. The two somehow concealed their marriage for a year out of fear that Steve Norris would question George's ability to support a wife. Throughout his career in business and politics, Sunshine, was always by his side and was an active "First Lady" of Bossier City for the sixteen years that he was mayor.

Dement resides at his family farm, original Norris property, near Frierson in DeSoto Parish, within the Shreveport-Bossier City metropolitan area. Dement has three sons, Steve G. Dement (born 1950), Walter Edward Dement (born 1952), and Timothy Lee "Tim" Dement, all of Frierson, a daughter, Ann Dement Montes, a minister from Bossier City, six grandchildren, and ten great-grandchildren.

Dement had a brief boxing career in the Navy, and three of his sons won boxing titles. Tim Dement, at the age of seventeen, was a contestant at the 1972 Olympic Games in Munich, Germany. He upset Bobby Hunter in the flyweight competition (105 – 112 pounds). Sports Illustrated described Tim as "a pale, dreamy looking boy of 17 with no indication of any strength." Over the years Tim Dement has trained amateur boxers. Tim Dement is a former Bossier City police detective who investigated cases of sexual predators involved in youth sports.

Another son, David Glenn Dement, died in 2006 at the age of fifty-two; he was a co-founder of GLAAD, an AIDS education and prevention group formed in 1980.

== Legacy ==
In 2003, Dement was awarded an honorary doctorate for outstanding service by his Alma mater, Centenary College.

In 2012, he completed his autobiography entitled George Dement: I will, If you will, Saith the Lord.

On February 2, 2013, Dement, along with Leonard R. "Pop" Hataway, the former sheriff of Grant Parish, political consultant Angelo Roppolo of Shreveport, and the late State Senator Charles C. Barham of Ruston and later Shreveport, was among those inducted into the Louisiana Political Museum and Hall of Fame in Winnfield.

Dement died at his home in Frierson on January 12, 2014, eleven days prior to his 92nd birthday. Services were held on January 15, 2014, at the First Baptist Church of Bossier City. Interment followed at Evergreen Cemetery in Frierson.

== See also ==
- List of mayors of Bossier City, Louisiana

Political offices
Preceded by Donald E. Jones	Mayor of Bossier City, Louisiana; 1989–2005	Succeeded by Lo Walker
