= Viktor Ivanov (boxer) =

Ukrainian boxer

Personal information
- Nationality: Ukrainian
- Born: 8 October 1956; Stalino, Ukrainian SSR, Soviet Union
- Died: 23 November 2007 (aged 51); Odessa, Ukraine

Sport
- Sport: Boxing

Viktor Ivanov (8 October 1956 – 23 November 2007) was a Ukrainian boxer. He competed for the Soviet Union in the men's heavyweight event at the 1976 Summer Olympics. At the 1976 Summer Olympics, he defeated Jürgen Fanghänel of East Germany, before losing to Atanas Sapundzhiev of Bulgaria.
