= Ali Gharbi (boxer) =

Tunisian boxer (born 1945)

Personal information
- Nationality: Tunisian
- Born: 21 March 1945 (age 80)
- Height: 165 cm (5 ft 5 in)
- Weight: 51 kg (112 lb)

Sport
- Sport: Boxing

Ali Gharbi (Arabic: علي غربي, born 21 March 1945) is a Tunisian boxer. He competed in the men's flyweight event at the 1972 Summer Olympics.
