= Pekka Ruokola =

Finnish boxer

Personal information
- Nationality: Finnish
- Born: 10 February 1951 (age 74); Koskenpää, Finland

Sport
- Sport: Boxing

Pekka Ruokola (born 10 February 1951) is a Finnish boxer. He competed in the men's heavyweight event at the 1976 Summer Olympics. At the 1976 Summer Olympics, he lost to Teófilo Stevenson of Cuba.
