= Ali Ouabbou =

Moroccan boxer

Personal information
- Nationality: Moroccan
- Born: 3 April 1941 (age 83)

Sport
- Sport: Boxing

Ali Ouabbou (born 3 April 1941) is a Moroccan boxer. He competed in the men's flyweight event at the 1972 Summer Olympics.
