= Mamadou Drame =

Senegalese boxer (born 1954)

Personal information
- Nationality: Senegalese
- Born: 18 April 1954 (age 70)

Sport
- Sport: Boxing

Mamadou Drame (born 18 April 1954) is a Senegalese boxer. He competed in the men's heavyweight event at the 1976 Summer Olympics where he finished in joint 9th place.
