= Nicolas Aquilino =

Filipino boxer

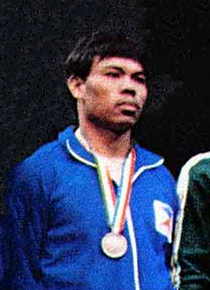
- Aquilino at the 1974 Asian Games

Personal information
- Born: January 4, 1953 (age 73)
- Height: 170 cm (5 ft 7 in)
- Weight: 71 kg (157 lb)

Sport
- Sport: Boxing
Medal record
Representing Philippines
Asian Games
Bronze medal – third place	1970 Bangkok	-71 kg
Bronze medal – third place	1974 Tehran	-71 kg

Nicolas Aquilino (born January 4, 1953) is a retired Filipino light-middleweight boxer. He won bronze medals at the 1970 and 1974 Asian Games and competed at the 1972 Olympics, where he was eliminated in the first bout.

== 1972 Olympic results ==
Below is the record of Nicolas Aquilino, a Filipino light middleweight boxer who competed at the 1972 Munich Olympics:

- Round of 32: lost to Evengelos Oikonomakos (Greece) by decision, 0-5
