= Frans van Bronckhorst =

Indonesian boxer (1949-2025)

Personal information
- Nationality: Indonesian
- Born: 2 April 1949 Bandung, West Java, Indonesia
- Died: 4 June 2025 (aged 76) Jakarta, Indonesia

Sport
- Sport: Boxing
Medal record
Men's boxing
Representing Indonesia
Asian Games
Bronze medal – third place	1974 Tehran	Welterweight
Asian Championships
Gold medal – first place	1973 Bangkok	Welterweight
Bronze medal – third place	1971 Tehran	Welterweight

Frans van Bronckhorst (2 April 1949 – 4 June 2025) was an Indonesian boxer. He competed in the men's welterweight event at the 1976 Summer Olympics. He lost to Australia's Robert Dauer, by unanimous decision, in his only bout. He died on 4 June 2025 in Jakarta.
