= Frierson, Louisiana =

- Census-designated place
- Location in De Soto Parish and the state of Louisiana.
- Coordinates: 32°15′04″N 93°41′21″W
- Country: United States
- State: Louisiana
- Parish: DeSoto

Area
  - Total: 0.56 sq mi (1.45 km^{2})
  - Land: 0.55 sq mi (1.43 km^{2})
  - Water: 0.0077 sq mi (0.02 km^{2})
- Elevation: 184 ft (56 m)

Population (2020)
  - Total: 132
  - Density: 239.1/sq mi (92.32/km^{2})
- Time zone: UTC-6 (Central (CST))
  - Summer (DST): UTC-5 (CDT)
- ZIP code: 71027
- FIPS code: 22-27540
- GNIS feature ID: 2586680

Frierson is an unincorporated community and census-designated place (CDP) in DeSoto Parish, Louisiana, United States. It is located approximately 3 miles (5 km) north of Interstate 49 (exit 186) along Louisiana State Highway 175.

As of the 2020 census, Frierson had a population of 132. The community is part of the Shreveport–Bossier City Metropolitan Statistical Area.

George Dement, former mayor of Bossier City, Louisiana, retired to his family farm in Frierson, where he died on January 12, 2014.

== Demographics ==
Historical population
Census	Pop.	Note	%±
2010	143		—
2020	132		−7.7%
U.S. Decennial Census

Frierson was first listed as a census designated place in the 2010 U.S. census.

Frierson CDP, Louisiana – Racial and ethnic composition Note: the US Census treats Hispanic/Latino as an ethnic category. This table excludes Latinos from the racial categories and assigns them to a separate category. Hispanics/Latinos may be of any race.
Race / Ethnicity (NH = Non-Hispanic)	Pop 2010	Pop 2020	% 2010	% 2020
White alone (NH)	46	39	32.17%	29.55%
Black or African American alone (NH)	90	81	62.94%	61.36%
Native American or Alaska Native alone (NH)	2	1	1.40%	0.76%
Asian alone (NH)	0	1	0.00%	0.76%
Native Hawaiian or Pacific Islander alone (NH)	0	0	0.00%	0.00%
Other race alone (NH)	0	0	0.00%	0.00%
Mixed race or Multiracial (NH)	2	8	1.40%	6.06%
Hispanic or Latino (any race)	3	2	2.10%	1.52%
Total	143	132	100.00%	100.00%
