= Antonio García (boxer) =

Spanish boxer

Personal information
- Full name: Antonio García García
- Nationality: Spanish
- Born: 15 August 1948
- Died: June 8, 2015 (aged 66)

Sport
- Sport: Boxing

Antonio García García (15 August 1948 – 8 June 2015) was a Spanish boxer. He competed in the men's flyweight event at the 1972 Summer Olympics.

He died in 2015.
