= Parviz Badpa =

Iranian boxer

Personal information
- Nationality: Iranian
- Born: 14 August 1954 (age 71)

Sport
- Sport: Boxing
Medal record
Asian Championships
Gold medal – first place	1975 Yokohama	+81 kg
Gold medal – first place	1977 Jakarta	+81 kg

Parviz Badpa (Persian: پرویز بادپا; born 14 August 1954) is an Iranian boxer. He competed in the men's heavyweight event at the 1976 Summer Olympics. At the 1976 Summer Olympics, he lost to Clarence Hill of Bermuda. He was the Asian heavyweight champion twice.
