= List of mayors of Bossier City, Louisiana =

The following is a list of mayors of the city of Bossier City, Louisiana, United States.

- Ewald Max Hoyer, c.1907
- M.B. Woodward, 1910-1919
- T.M. Yarborough, 1919-1921
- G.B. Smith, 1921-1925
- Thomas Hickman, 1925-1937
- Hoffman L. Fuller, 1937-1953
- Burgess E. McCranie, 1953-1957
- Jake W. Cameron, 1957-1961
- George L. Nattin, 1961-1973
- James L. Cathey, c.1973
- Marvin E. Anding, 1977-1983
- Donald E. Jones, c.1988
- George Dement, 1989-2005
- Lo Walker, 2005-2021
- Tommy Chandler, 2021–present

== See also ==
- Bossier City history
