= Salvador Miranda (boxer) =

Nicaraguan boxer (born 1949)

Personal information
- Nationality: Nicaraguan
- Born: 13 September 1949 (age 76)

Sport
- Sport: Boxing

Salvador Miranda (born 13 September 1949) is a Nicaraguan boxer. He competed in the men's flyweight event at the 1972 Summer Olympics. At the 1972 Summer Olympics, he lost to Arturo Delgado of Mexico.

He was national champion from 1968 to 1972 and won the bronze medal at the 1970 Central American and Caribbean Games.
