= László Pákozdi (boxer) =

Hungarian boxer

Personal information
- Nationality: Hungarian
- Born: 5 January 1951 (age 74); Cegléd, Hungary

Sport
- Sport: Boxing

László Pákozdi (born 5 January 1951) is a Hungarian boxer. He competed in the men's heavyweight event at the 1976 Summer Olympics.
