= Atanas Sapundzhiev =

Bulgarian boxer

Personal information
- Nationality: Bulgarian
- Born: 14 July 1950 (age 75) Sliven, Bulgaria

Sport
- Sport: Boxing

Atanas Sapundzhiev (Атанас Суванджиев; born 14 July 1950) is a Bulgarian boxer. He competed at the 1972 Summer Olympics and the 1976 Summer Olympics. At the 1976 Summer Olympics, he defeated Mahmoud Ahmed Ali and Viktor Ivanov, before losing to Mircea Șimon.
