= Wiem Gommies =

Indonesian boxer (born 1945)

Personal information
- Nationality: Indonesian
- Born: 6 December 1945 (age 80) Ambon, Indonesia

Sport
- Sport: Boxing
Medal record
Men's boxing
Representing Indonesia
Asian Games
Gold medal – first place	1970 Bangkok	Middleweight
Gold medal – first place	1978 Bangkok	Middleweight
Asian Championships
Gold medal – first place	1971 Tehran	Middleweight
Silver medal – second place	1977 Jakarta	Middleweight
Bronze medal – third place	1973 Bangkok	Middleweight
SEA Games
Gold medal – first place	1977 Kuala Lumpur	Middleweight

William "Wiem" Gommies (born 06 December 1945) is an Indonesian boxer. He competed in the men's middleweight event at the 1972 Summer Olympics. At the 1972 Summer Olympics, he lost to Vyacheslav Lemeshev of the Soviet Union.
