= Felix Maina =

Kenyan boxer

Personal information
- Nationality: Kenyan
- Born: 24 August 1954 (age 70)

Sport
- Sport: Boxing

Felix Maina (born 24 August 1954) is a Kenyan boxer. He competed in the men's flyweight event at the 1972 Summer Olympics.
