= Tim Dement =

American Olympic boxer

Timothy Lee "Tim" Dement
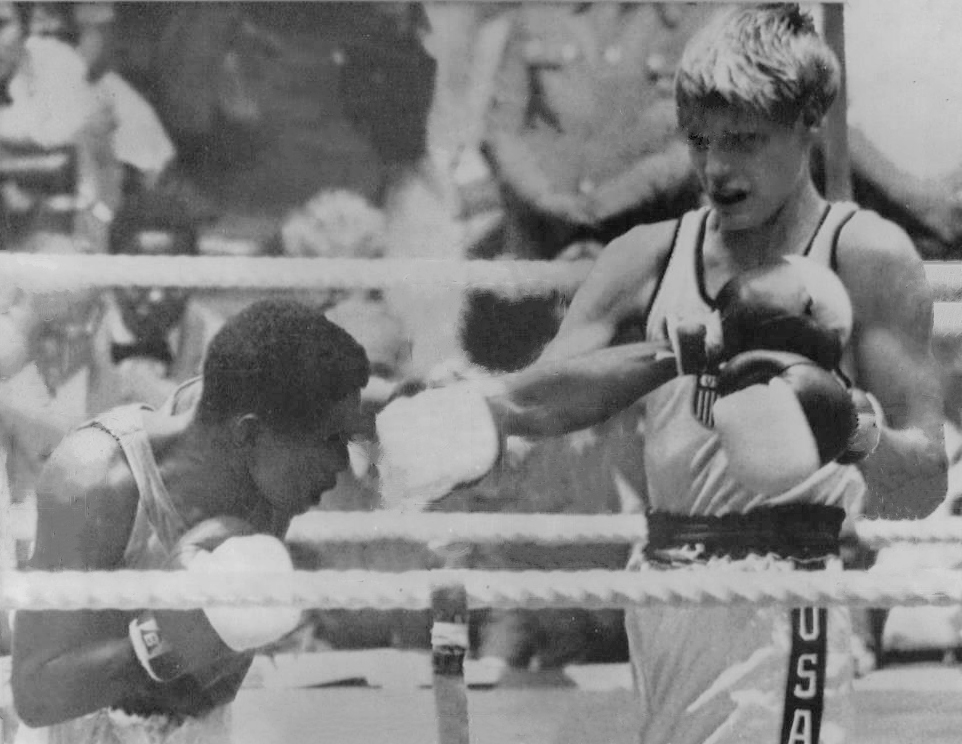
- Dement (right) vs. Calixto Pérez at the 1972 Olympics

Personal information
- Born: March 14, 1955 (age 71) Bossier City, Louisiana
- Height: 179 cm (5 ft 10 in)

Sport
- Sport: Boxing
- Club: Toastmasters Club

Timothy Lee Dement (born March 14, 1955) is an American former amateur boxer. He competed in the flyweight division at the 1972 Summer Olympics and lost his second bout to Calixto Pérez. He was described by Sports Illustrated as "a pale, dreamy looking boy of 17 with no indication of any strength" after causing an upset of the favored Bobby Hunter during the Olympic trials. Dement qualified for the 1971 Pan American Games, but was not selected because of his young age.

Dement is a former police detective in Bossier City, Louisiana, who investigated cases of sexual predators involved in youth sports.

His father was George Dement, a restaurateur and innkeeper who served as mayor of Bossier City from 1989 to 2005.
