= Sodnomyn Gombo =

Mongolian boxer (born 1946)

Personal information
- Nationality: Mongolian
- Born: 7 February 1946 (age 79)

Sport
- Sport: Boxing

Sodnomyn Gombo (Mongolian: Содномын Гомбо; born 7 February 1946) is a Mongolian boxer. He competed at the 1972 Summer Olympics and the 1976 Summer Olympics.
