= Fujio Nagai =

Japanese boxer (1951–2007)

Personal information
- Nationality: Japanese
- Born: 29 September 1951 Takasaki, Japan
- Died: 28 September 2007 (aged 55)

Sport
- Sport: Boxing

Fujio Nagai (永井 希仁男, Nagai Fujio; 29 September 1951 – 28 September 2007) was a Japanese boxer. He competed in the men's flyweight event at the 1972 Summer Olympics. At the 1972 Summer Olympics, he defeated Rene Fortaleza of the Philippines, before losing to Douglas Rodriguez of Cuba.
