= Mircea Șimon =

Romanian boxer

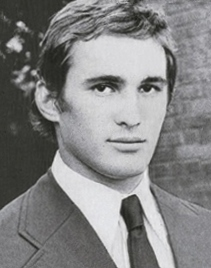

Personal information
- Born: 22 January 1954 (age 72) Bucharest, Socialist Republic of Romania
- Height: 191 cm (6 ft 3 in)
- Weight: Heavyweight

Boxing career
- Stance: Orthodox

Boxing record
- Total fights: 14
- Wins: 12
- Win by KO: 10
- Losses: 0
- Draws: 2
Medal record
Representing Romania
Romania National Amateur Boxing Championships
Gold medal – first place	1974 Bucharest	Light heavyweight
Gold medal – first place	1975 Bucharest	Heavyweight
Gold medal – first place	1976 Bucharest	Heavyweight
Gold medal – first place	1977 Bucharest	Heavyweight
Olympic Games
Silver medal – second place	1976 Montreal	Heavyweight
European Amateur Championships
Bronze medal – third place	1975 Katowice	Heavyweight
Bronze medal – third place	1977 Halle	Heavyweight

Mircea Șimon (born 22 January 1954) is a retired Romanian heavyweight boxer.

== Amateur career ==
He took up boxing in 1971 at Dinamo Bucharest, coached by Constantin Nour, and won a silver medal at the 1976 Olympics, losing to Teófilo Stevenson in the final. Șimon also won four national senior titles and two bronze medals at the European Amateur Boxing Championships.

== Professional career ==
In 1978 he fled to the United States, where in 1978–1979 he fought 14 bouts as a professional with a record of 12 wins and two draws. He later returned to Romania and coached Marian and Dorel Simion.

He then took a break from boxing for ten years, and in 2007 worked with Romanian Boxing Federation to prepare the national team for the 2008 Olympics.

== Professional record ==
12 Wins (10 knockouts, 2 decisions), 2 Draws
Res.	Record	Opponent	Type	Rd., Time	Date	Location	Notes
Draw	12–2–0	(United States) Leroy Caldwell	PTS	10 (10)	1979-09-27	Olympic Auditorium, Los Angeles, California, United States	
Win	12–1–0	(United States) Charlie Johnson	KO	4 (10)	1979-08-30	Olympic Auditorium, Los Angeles, California, United States	
Win	11–1–0	(Samoa) Koroseta Kid	KO	2 (10)	1979-07-26	Olympic Auditorium, Los Angeles, California, United States	
Win	10–1–0	(United States) Tony Pulu	KO	3 (10)	1979-06-14	Olympic Auditorium, Los Angeles, California, United States	
Win	9–1–0	(United States) Beau Williford	KO	2 (10)	1979-04-26	Olympic Auditorium, Los Angeles, California, United States	
Draw	8–1–0	(United States) Eddie López	PTS	10 (10)	1979-03-01	Olympic Auditorium, Los Angeles, California, United States	
Win	8–0	(United States) James Dixon	KO	2 (10)	1979-02-01	Olympic Auditorium, Los Angeles, California, United States	
Win	7–0	(United States) Oliver Philipps	TKO	2 (10)	1978-10-26	Olympic Auditorium, Los Angeles, California, United States	
Win	6–0	(United States) David Wynne	KO	1	1978-09-15	Superdome, New Orleans, Louisiana, United States	
Win	5–0	(United States) Mark Junior	KO	2	1978-07-27	Olympic Auditorium, Los Angeles, California, United States	
Win	4–0	(United States) Dan Johnson	KO	6 (8)	1978-06-15	Olympic Auditorium, Los Angeles, California, United States	
Win	3–0	(United States) Bob Swoopes	PTS	8 (8)	1978-05-18	Olympic Auditorium, Los Angeles, California, United States	
Win	2–0	(United States) Rocky Jones	KO	1	1978-05-04	Olympic Auditorium, Los Angeles, California, United States	
Win	1–0	(United States) Rocky Jones	UD	6 (6)	1978-03-18	The Aladdin, Las Vegas, Nevada, United States	
