= Saidi Tambwe =

Tanzanian boxer (born 1952)

Personal information
- Nationality: Tanzanian
- Born: 30 January 1952 (age 73)

Sport
- Sport: Boxing

Saidi Tambwe (born 30 January 1952) is a Tanzanian boxer. He competed in the men's flyweight event at the 1972 Summer Olympics.
