= Nyamdashiin Batsüren =

Mongolian boxer (born 1945)

Personal information
- Nationality: Mongolian
- Born: 21 December 1945 (age 80)
- Height: 167 cm (5 ft 6 in)
- Weight: 51 kg (112 lb)

Boxing career
- Weight class: Flyweight

Nyamdashiin Batsüren (Нямдашийн Батсүрэн, born 21 December 1945) is a Mongolian boxer. He competed in the men's flyweight event at the 1972 Summer Olympics.
