= Boris Zoriktuyev =

Russian boxer

Personal information
- Nationality: Russian
- Born: 20 March 1949 Orongoy, Russian SFSR, Soviet Union
- Died: 1988 (aged 38–39)

Sport
- Sport: Boxing

Boris Zoriktuyev (20 March 1949 – 1988) was a Russian boxer. He competed in the men's flyweight event at the 1972 Summer Olympics.
