= Kemal Solunur =

Turkish boxer

Personal information
- Born: 26 January 1951 (age 74)

Sport
- Sport: Boxing

Kemal Solunur (born 26 January 1951) is a Turkish boxer. He competed at the 1972 Summer Olympics and the 1976 Summer Olympics.
