= Douglas Rodríguez (boxer) =

Cuban boxer (1950–2012)

Personal information
- Full name: Douglas Rodríguez Gardiola
- Born: June 3, 1950 Santiago de Cuba, Republic of Cuba
- Died: May 21, 2012 (age 61) Havana
- Height: 1.60 m (5 ft 3 in)
- Weight: 51 kg (112 lb)

Sport
- Sport: Boxing
- Weight class: Flyweight
Medal record
World Amateur Championships
Gold medal – first place	1974 Havana	Flyweight
Pan American Games
Bronze medal – third place	1971 Cali	Flyweight
Olympic Games
Bronze medal – third place	1972 Munich	Flyweight

Douglas Rodríguez (June 3, 1950 – May 21, 2012 in Havana) was an amateur boxer from Cuba, who represented his native country in the Men's Flyweight (– 51 kg) category at the 1972 Summer Olympics in Munich, West Germany.

There he won the bronze medal after being stopped in the semifinals by Uganda's eventual silver medalist Leo Rwabwogo. Rodríguez claimed the first ever world title in his weight division by defeating Venezuela's Alfredo Pérez in the final of the 1974 World Amateur Boxing Championships in Havana, Cuba.

Rodríguez's death was confirmed on May 21, 2012. He had suffered a heart attack at his home in Cuba. He was 61.
