= E. Chawngtui =

- village
- Location in Mizoram, India E. Chawngtui (India)
- Coordinates: 23.1275124°N 93.3247266°E
- Country: India
- State: Mizoram
- District: Champhai
- Block: Khawbung
- Elevation: 1,384 m (4,541 ft)

Population (2011)
  - Total: 290
- Time zone: UTC+5:30 (IST)
- 2011 census code: 271370

E. Chawngtui is a village in the Champhai district of Mizoram, India. It is located in the Khawbung R.D. Block.

== Demographics ==
According to the 2011 census of India, E. Chawngtui has 59 households. The effective literacy rate (i.e. the literacy rate of population excluding children aged 6 and below) is 95%.

Demographics (2011 Census)
	Total	Male	Female
Population	290	147	143
Children aged below 6 years	70	35	35
Scheduled caste	0	0	0
Scheduled tribe	288	146	142
Literates	209	110	99
Workers (all)	144	73	71
Main workers (total)	75	63	12
Main workers: Cultivators	70	60	10
Main workers: Agricultural labourers	1	0	1
Main workers: Household industry workers	1	0	1
Main workers: Other	3	3	0
Marginal workers (total)	69	10	59
Marginal workers: Cultivators	5	3	2
Marginal workers: Agricultural labourers	1	1	0
Marginal workers: Household industry workers	2	0	2
Marginal workers: Others	61	6	55
Non-workers	146	74	72
