= Syamsul Anwar Harahap =

Indonesian boxer (born 1952)

Personal information
- Nationality: Indonesian
- Born: 1 August 1952 (age 73) Pematangsiantar, Indonesia

Sport
- Sport: Boxing
Medal record
Men's boxing
Representing Indonesia
Asian Championships
Gold medal – first place	1977 Jakarta	Light welterweight
SEA Games
Gold medal – first place	1977 Kuala Lumpur	Light welterweight

Syamsul Anwar Harahap (born 1 August 1952) is an Indonesian boxer. He competed in the men's light welterweight event at the 1976 Summer Olympics.
