= Abdolreza Andaveh =

Iranian heavyweight boxer

Personal information
- Native name: عبدالرضا انداوه
- National team: Imperial State of Iran
- Born: 19 June 1952 (age 74) Abadan
- Height: 193 cm (6 ft 4 in)

Sport
- Weight class: Heavyweight
Medal record
Men's amateur boxing
Representing Imperial State of Iran
Asian Games
Gold medal – first place	1974 Tehran	Heavyweight
Asian Championships
Gold medal – first place	1973 Bangkok	Heavyweight

Abdolreza Andaveh (Persian: عبدالرضا انداوه) is an Iranian former heavyweight boxer. He won gold medals in the heavyweight division at the 1973 Asian Amateur Boxing Championships in Bangkok and the 1974 Asian Games in Tehran.

== Career ==
Andaveh represented Iran in the heavyweight division during the early 1970s. At the 1973 Asian Amateur Boxing Championships in Bangkok, he won the heavyweight gold medal.

At the 1974 Asian Games in Tehran, Andaveh won the heavyweight gold medal in the final bout against India's Til Bahadur Bura. According to a Reuters report in the New Straits Times, Andaveh landed heavy blows in the first round before Bura rallied in the second round and knocked him down with a right cross. Referee Mohamed Yasin of Malaysia initially counted Andaveh out before disqualifying Bura for striking after a break had been called, awarding the bout and gold medal to Andaveh amid ringside protests from Indian officials and spectators. His victory gave Iran its third boxing gold medal of the Games, finishing second overall in the boxing medal table behind South Korea.
