= Calixto Pérez =

Colombian boxer (1949–2018)

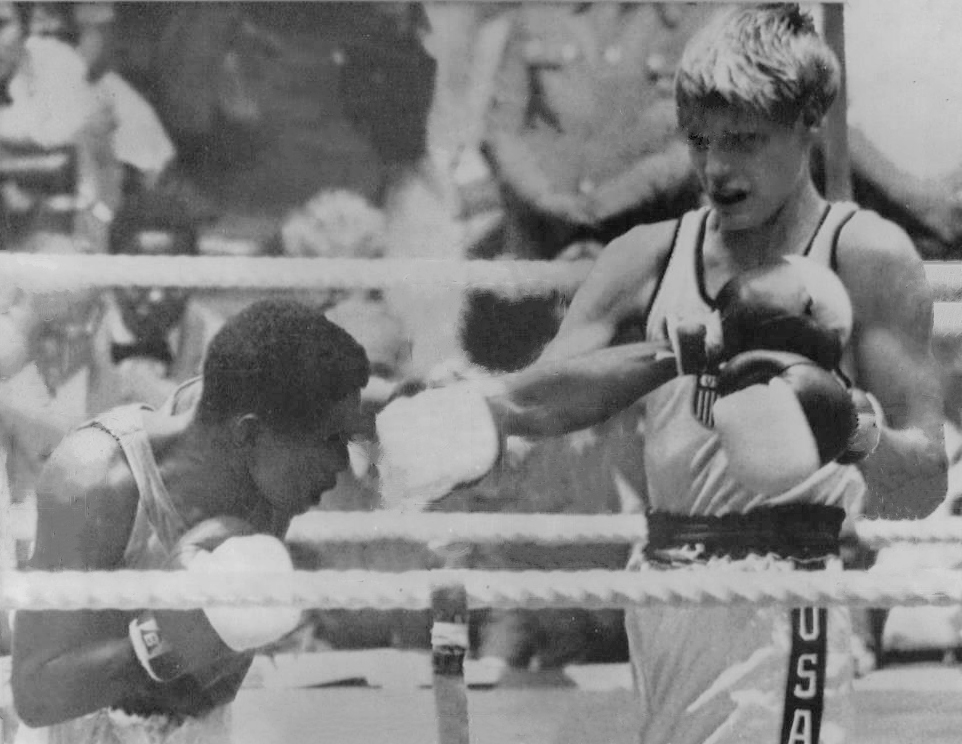
- Pérez (left) vs. Tim Dement at the 1972 Olympics

Personal information
- Born: October 10, 1949 Cartagena, Colombia
- Died: July 28, 2018 (aged 68)
- Height: 167 cm (5 ft 6 in)

Boxing career

Boxing record
- Total fights: 19
- Wins: 7
- Win by KO: 1
- Losses: 10
- Draws: 2
Medal record
Representing Colombia
Pan American Games
Silver medal – second place	1971 Cali	Bantamweight

Calixto Pérez (October 10, 1949 – July 28, 2018) was a boxer from Colombia, who won a silver medal at the 1971 Pan American Games. At the 1972 Olympics he was eliminated in the flyweight quarterfinals by the eventual gold medalist Georgi Kostadinov. In 1973 Pérez turned professional, and retired in 1978 after 19 bouts.
