= Park Tai-shik =

Korean male boxer (born 1952)

Personal information
- Nationality: South Korean
- Born: 8 January 1952 (age 73)

Sport
- Sport: Boxing

Park Tai-shik (born 8 January 1952) is a South Korean boxer. He competed at the 1972 Summer Olympics and the 1976 Summer Olympics. At the 1976 Summer Olympics, he lost to Vladimir Kolev of Bulgaria.
