= Arturo Delgado =

Mexican boxer (born 1951)

Personal information
- Nationality: Mexican
- Born: 17 November 1951 (age 74)

Sport
- Sport: Boxing
Medal record
Men's amateur boxing
Representing Mexico
Pan American Games
Silver medal – second place	1971 Cali	Flyweight

Arturo Delgado (born 17 November 1951) is a Mexican boxer. He competed in the men's flyweight event at the 1972 Summer Olympics, in Munich, West Germany.
