= Mohamed Selim Soheim =

Egyptian boxer

Personal information
- Nationality: Egyptian
- Born: 7 July 1947 (age 77); Cairo, Egypt

Sport
- Sport: Boxing

Mohamed Selim Soheim (born 7 July 1947) is an Egyptian boxer. He competed at the 1968 Summer Olympics and the 1972 Summer Olympics.
