= Chris Ius =

Canadian boxer

Chris Ius (born January 14, 1954, in Vancouver, British Columbia) is a Canadian boxer, who represented his native country at two consecutive Summer Olympics, starting in 1972. In both tournaments he was eliminated in the third round.

== Boxing Club ==
Chris was one of the many outstanding boxers that were part of the North West Eagles Boxing Club in North Vancouver. His primary coach was his uncle Elio Ius. Another key boxer at the club during the Ius boxing journey in the Seventies was Les Hamilton and Ian Douglas. Others were Dan Wright and David Ius.

== Canadian Championships ==
Chris Ius was a four-time senior national boxing champion in 1971, 1972, 1973 and 1976. During this six-year period some of the other top ranked champions were Carmen Rinke, Chris Clarke, Cleveland Denny, Ian Clyde, Marv Arneson and Sidney McKnight.

== 1972 Olympic results ==
Below is the record of Chris Ius, a flyweight boxer who competed for Canada at the 1972 Munich Olympics:

- Round of 64: bye
- Round of 32: defeated Ali Ouabbou (Morocco) by decision, 3-2
- Round of 16: Lost to Georgi Kostadinov (Bulgaria) by decision, 0-5

== 1976 Olympics ==
Chris Ius of Canada competed as a bantamweight at the 1976 Olympic boxing tournament in Montreal. Here are his results:

- Round of 64: bye
- Round of 32: defeated Mohamed Ayele (Ethiopia) by walkover
- Round of 16: lost to Weerachart Saturngrun (Thailand) by decision, 0-5
