= Mohammad Reza Shah Stadium =

Indoor arena in Tehran, Iran

Coordinates: 35.684875°N 51.416069°E

Mohammad Reza Shah Satdium
- Interactive map of Mohammad Reza Shah Satdium
- Full name: Mohammad Reza Shah Sporting Hall (formerly known as Pahlavi Sporting Hall)
- Location: Tehran، Iran
- Owner: Iranian Wrestling Federation
- Capacity: 6000

Construction
- Opened: 1957

Mohammad Reza Shah Stadium is one of the oldest indoor arenas in Tehran which has been built in 1957. This arena is located on Fayyazbakhsh street. It is mostly used for Wrestling competitions.

The Shooting at the Tehran 1974 Asian Games was held at this Sports Hall.
