= Rene Fortaleza =

Filipino boxer

Personal information
- Nationality: Filipino
- Born: October 30, 1954
- Died: October 17, 2003 (aged 48) Manila, Philippines
- Education: FEU
- Height: 5 ft 5 in (165 cm)
- Weight: 112 lb (51 kg)

Sport
- Sport: Boxing

Renato "Rene" Fortaleza (October 30, 1954 – October 17, 2003) was a Filipino boxer, coach, judge, and executive. He competed in the men's flyweight event at the 1972 Summer Olympics. There, he lost to Fujio Nagai of Japan. After retiring, he became the secretary-general of the Amateur Boxing Association of the Philippines.

== Personal life ==
Fortaleza came from a boxing family. Three of his seven brothers, Ric, Roger, and Rey, became boxers. He studied at Far Eastern University, where he also worked as a security officer.

== Career ==
Fortaleza won the featherweight gold during the 1971 Asian Youth Boxing Championships, which led to his Olympic stint. The following year, he competed in the men's flyweight event at the 1972 Summer Olympics. There, he lost to Fujio Nagai of Japan. He then won the silver medal in the 1975 Asian Boxing Championships and a gold medal in the 1979 ASEAN Boxing Championships.

== Post-boxing career ==
He and his brother Rey were the coaches of the national boxing team from 1987 to 1988.

In 1988, Fortaleza was one of the judges of several fight-offs for a spot in the 1988 Seoul Olympics during a time when there was a leadership dispute in the Amateur Boxing Association of the Philippines between Gemiliano "Mel" Lopez and Roilo Golez. In one of the fight-offs, he and the other judges favored a boxer who was endorsed by Lopez despite the other boxer, Michael Hormillosa, dealing more damage to him. The judges were in Lopez's camp as well, and ruled their fighter the winner. After Hormillosa's coach protested, the Philippine Olympic Committee reversed their decision, and Hormillosa was among the athletes who competed in Seoul.

In 1989, Fortaleza became the secretary-general of the ABAP under Lopez. In 1992, he was a boxing referee and judge for the 1992 Barcelona Olympics. After his cancer diagnosis, he briefly stepped away from his ABAP duties and went abroad to rest with his relatives. He then returned to the country and resumed his duties with the ABAP. He was at the 2003 Xinjiang International Boxing Championships which saw Filipino boxer Violito Payla lose to China’s Guo Xianshuan, which the Philippine team protested.

== Death ==
During the final two years of his life, Fortaleza had been battling cancer and had been undergoing chemotherapy in his last months. In October, after supervising a tournament in Bohol, he began suffering from the flu and had difficulty breathing. After staying at a hospital there, he returned to Manila where he was brought to the Philippine General Hospital. On October 17, 2003, he died due to multiple organ failure at 7 p.m. His remains lie with his family in Antipolo.
