= Vanlal Dawla =

Burmese boxer

Personal information
- Nationality: Burmese
- Born: 10 November 1947 (age 78) Chawngtui, Mizo District, Assam, India (now in Mizoram)

Sport
- Sport: Boxing

Vanlal Dawla (born 10 November 1947) is an Indian-born Burmese boxer. He competed in the men's flyweight event at the 1972 Summer Olympics. He was the national champion of Burma in 1967–68 and 1971–72.

== Career ==
Vanlal Dawla was born to a Union Military Police officer in Mizoram and later also joined the Union Military Police. He represented the Chin State in sports until 1965 when he joined the Burmese Navy.

Dawla represented Burma in international events and won gold at the 1969 Southeast Asian Peninsular Games. He also won silver in 1971 and 1973 SEA Games and a bronze medal in the 1967 SEA Games. He also won a silver medal at the 1970 Asian Boxing Championships.
