= Jan Muhammad Baloch =

Pakistani boxer and coach (c.1950–2012)

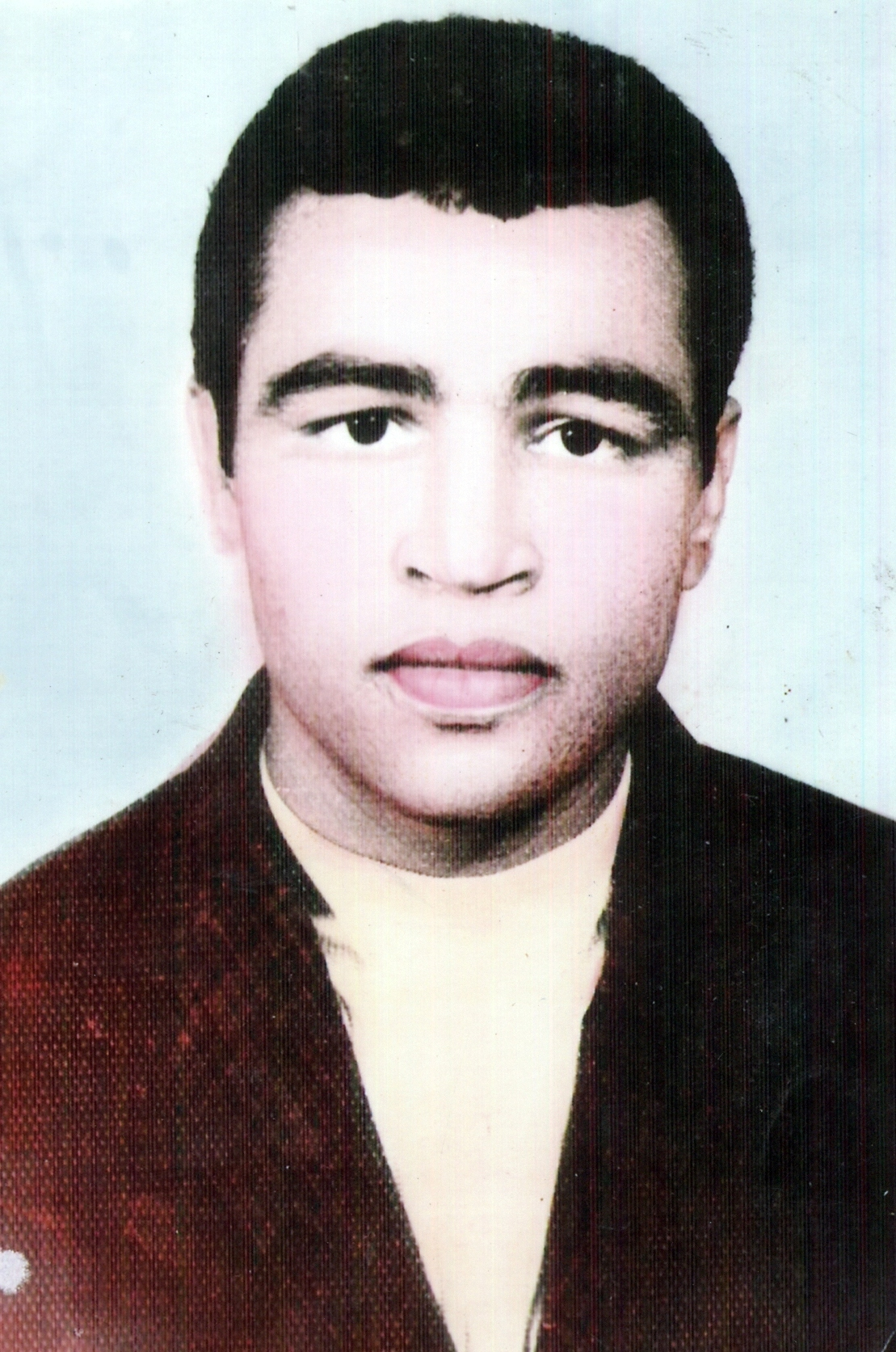

Personal information
- Born: 1950 Karachi, Pakistan
- Died: August 3, 2012 (aged 61–62) Karachi, Pakistan

Boxing career

Boxing record
- Wins: 1972 Summer Olympics; RCD Boxing Championship; National Championship, Lahore; Quaid-e-Azam International Boxing tournament
- Losses: 1970 British Commonwealth Games
Medal record
Men's amateur boxing
Representing Pakistan
Silver Medal
Gold medal – first place	1976 Karachi	Quaid-e-Azam International Boxing tournament
Gold Medal
Gold medal – first place	1975 Ankara	RCD Boxing Championship
Bronze Medal
Gold medal – first place	1974 Tehran	Tehran Asian Games
Gold Medal
Gold medal – first place	1973 Colombo	Hilali Cup

Jan Muhammad Baloch (c. 1950 – 3 August 2012; sometimes spelled Jan Mohammad Baloch), was a Pakistani former olympian boxer, coach of the Pakistan national boxing team appointed by the Pakistan Boxing Federation and the founder of RCD Boxing Club. He made his international debut with 1970 British Commonwealth Games and represented the country in four Asian Games, including 1972 Summer Olympics, 1978 Asian boxing tournament and RCD Boxing Championship administered or organised by the Turkish Boxing Federation.

In 1976, he appeared in the Quaid-e-Azam International Boxing tournament in Karachi, leading him to become the recipient of a silver medal. Later in 1975, he became the recipient of a gold medal during his participation in the RCD Boxing Championship held in Ankara.

== Biography ==
He was born in 1950 in Lyari village of Karachi. He had ten children, including a daughter suffering from polio.

=== Career ===
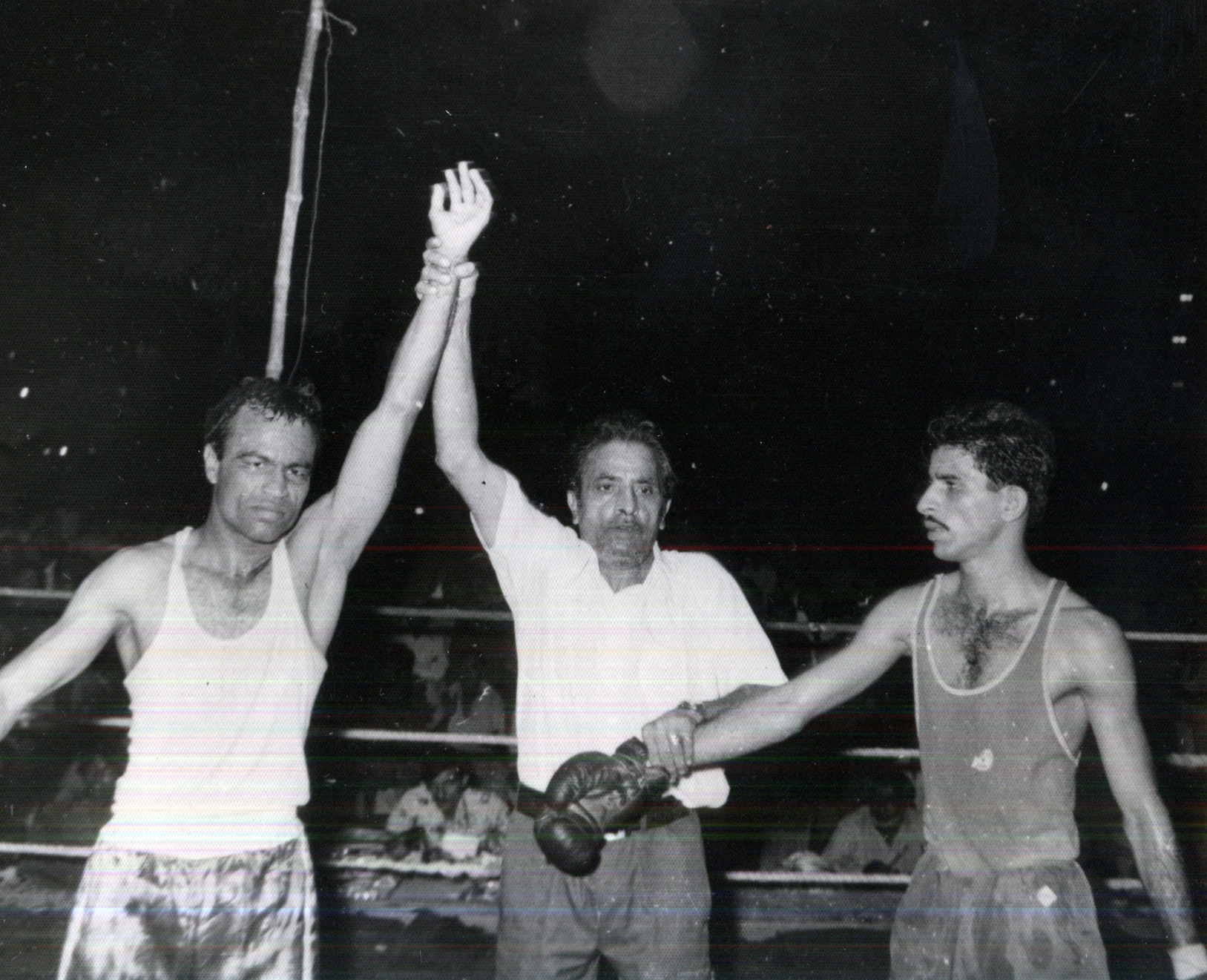
Jan Muhammad (left) at the 1977 Asian Amateur Boxing Championships

He started his boxing career at the apparent age of ten and was later assigned to the Muslim Azad Boxing Club in 1972. He subsequently became the recipient of a gold medal after participating in an uncertain National Championship in Lahore and retained his position as a national champion under his category until he retired in 1979.

In 1973, he participated in the Hilali Cup held in Colombo, leading him to become the recipient of another gold medal and a bronze medal in 1974 at the Tehran Asian Games. He also participated in the 1977 Asian Amateur Boxing Championships.

He later worked as a boxing coach for over twenty years. He was also associated with the Pakistan Navy, railways and Karachi Electric Supply Company (in modern-day K-Electric).

== Death ==
He was suffering from liver cancer and died in Karachi on 3 August 2012. He is buried at Mewa Shah Graveyard of Sindh.
