= Chawalit On-Chim =

Thai boxer

Personal information
- Nationality: Thai
- Born: 29 September 1945 (age 79)

Sport
- Sport: Boxing

Chawalit On-Chim (born 29 September 1945) is a Thai boxer. He competed in the men's flyweight event at the 1972 Summer Olympics.
