= Mehtab Singh (boxer) =

Indian boxer (1948–2021)

Personal information
- Nationality: Indian
- Born: 5 January 1948; Isharwal, Haryana
- Died: 6 January 2021 (aged 73); Manesar, Haryana

Sport
- Sport: Boxing

Mehtab Singh (5 January 1948 – 6 January 2021) was an Indian boxer. He competed in the men's light heavyweight event at the 1972 Summer Olympics. He died on 5 January 2021.
