= Jabbar Feli =

Iranian boxer (born 1950)

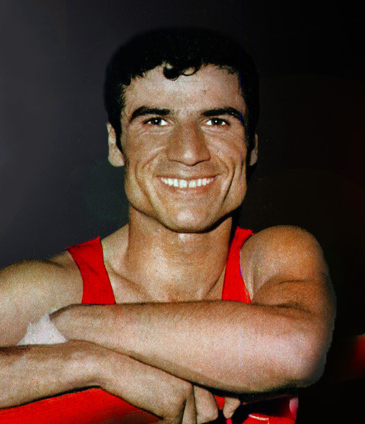
- Feli in 1974

Personal information
- Born: May 8, 1950 (age 76)
- Height: 168 cm (5 ft 6 in)

Sport
- Sport: Boxing
- Club: Iranian Air Force
Medal record
Representing Iran
Asian Games
Silver medal – second place	1974 Tehran	-57 kg
Asian Championships
Gold medal – first place	1973 Bangkok	-57 kg
Bronze medal – third place	1977 Jakarta	-57 kg

Jabbar Feli (Persian: جبار فعلی; born May 8, 1950) is a retired Iranian amateur boxer. He won a silver medal at the 1974 Asian Games and competed at the 1972 Olympics, where he was eliminated in the first bout. At the Asian Championships he won a gold medal in 1973 and a bronze in 1977.

== 1972 Olympic results ==
Below is the record of Jabbar Feli, an Iranian featherweight boxer who competed at the 1972 Munich Olympics:

- Round of 64: bye
- lost to Philip Waruinge (Kenya) by decision, 1-4:
