= Chander Narayanan =

Indian boxer

Personal information
- Nationality: Indian
- Born: 18 August 1947 (age 77)

Sport
- Sport: Boxing

Chander Narayanan (born 18 August 1947) is an Indian former boxer. He competed in the men's flyweight event at the 1972 Summer Olympics.
