= Yu Jong-man =

Korean male boxer (born 1954)

Personal information
- Nationality: South Korean
- Born: 1 December 1954 (age 70)

Sport
- Sport: Boxing

Yu Jong-man (born 1 December 1954) is a South Korean boxer. He competed in the men's flyweight event at the 1972 Summer Olympics.
