= Syed Abdul Kadir =

Singaporean boxer

Kadir Syed Abdul
Personal information
- Nationality: Singapore
- Born: 16 February 1948 (age 78) Singapore

Boxing career

Kadir Syed Abdul, born 16 February 1948, was the first Singaporean to win a medal for boxing in the Commonwealth Games, where he was awarded the bronze medal. He has also been a representative for Singapore in various regional meets.

== Boxing career ==
Kadir started boxing at the age of 11 and participated in school boxing championships in the light featherweight class. At 18, he trained under a coach who was an ex-professional boxer. He started competitive boxing in the light flyweight division and started to win matches.

In 1968, with a new coach, Kadir won the Singapore Open title which he defended successfully till 1976, when he retired from boxing. In 1969, he won the National Championship and went on to represent Singapore in the South East Asian Peninsular Games in Bangkok, which he won a bronze medal. In 1970, Kadir represented Singapore in the Asian Games in Bangkok, in which he lost in the first round. In the 1971 SEAP Games, he won the boxing gold medal in the light flyweight category after defeating defending SEAP champion Vanla Dawla. For this, the Singapore National Olympic Council (SNOC) awarded him a merit award.

In 1972, Kadir represented Singapore at the 1972 Olympic Games in Munich but failed to obtain any medal due to an injury, a cut sustained on the eyebrow. In 1973, he won the silver medal at the SEAP Games.

In 1974, Kadir won a bronze medal at the British Commonwealth Games in New Zealand, Singapore's third medal at the Games but the first outside weightlifting. He was then named the Sportsman of the Year by the SNOC, in recognition for his contribution to boxing and sports in Singapore. He also attended the Asian Games in Tehran but was lost again in the first round. In 1975, Kadir earned another silver at the SEAP Games in Bangkok.

In late 1976, Kadir announced his retirement after the President's Cup in Jakarta. He retired with a record of 11 losses in over 100 fights and reigned as Singapore champion for eight years.

== Coaching career ==
After retiring from competition, Kadir began coaching the national boxing team and served on Singapore Amateur Boxing Association (SABA) management committee.

In 1985, the national team won several international medals, including its first Southeast Asian Games gold in 12 years. He was named Coach of the Year by the SNOC for that year, making him the second person after bowler Henry Tan to receive both the Sportsman and Coach of the Year honours.

Kadir left SABA in 1998 but returned in 1989 when he was appointed as the chairman of the coaching committee of the Sea Games squad.

In 2009, Kadir was elected as the president of SABA, having served in various capacities at the association over the past three decades - as national coach, honorary secretary and vice-president.

== Personal life ==
Kadir studied in St Andrew's Junior School and Bartley Secondary School.

Kadir married Zalia Jaffar, a receptionist for the Singapore Sports Council, in 1974. They have a son, Syed Muhammed Fahmy, who also became Singaporean boxing champion and a daughter Hanni.
