= Mayaki Seydou =

Nigerien boxer (born 1949)

Personal information
- Nationality: Nigerien
- Born: Mayaki Seydou; 1949 (age 76–77)

Sport
- Sport: Boxing

Mayaki Seydou (born 1949) is a Nigerien former boxer. Seydou would compete at the 1972 Summer Olympics representing Niger in men's boxing. He would compete in the men's bantamweight division.

In his first match, Seydou beat Mehmet Kunova of Turkey and advanced to the second round. In the second round, he would lose to Stefan Förster of East Germany and would not advance further. Seydou placed equal seventeenth in the event alongside fifteen other competitors.

== Biography ==
Mayaki Seydou was born in 1949. Seydou would compete at the 1972 Summer Olympics in Munich, Germany, representing Niger in men's boxing. There, Seydou would compete in the men's bantamweight division for competitors that weighed 54 kilograms (119 lb) or less. The first round of the competition would be held on 27 August 1972. Seydou would not receive a bye in the round and instead competed against Mehmet Kunova of Turkey. In the round, Seydou would defeat Kunova by decision and advanced to the second round.

The second round of the competition were held three days later on 2 September 1972. Seydou would compete against Stefan Förster of East Germany. There, Seydou would be defeated by Förster by decision and would not advance further to the third round held in the same day. He placed equal seventeenth alongside competitors: Manuchehr Bahmani, Eduardo Barragán, Aldo Cosentino, Ricardo Fortaleza, Abdel Aziz Hammi, Ove Lundby, Win Maung, Pierre Amont N'Diaye, Mick O'Brien, Flevitus Bitegeko, David Oleme, Werner Schäfer, René Silva, Deusdete Vasconcelos, and Charndej Weerapol, in a field of 38 competitors in the event.
