= Boxing at the 1972 Summer Olympics – Bantamweight =

Olympic boxing tournament

Bantamweight boxing at the Games of the XX Olympiad
- Venue: Boxing Hall, Munich
- Dates: 27 August – 10 September 1972
- Competitors: 38 from 38 nations

Medalists
| 1st place, gold medalist(s) | | Orlando Martínez | Cuba |
| 2nd place, silver medalist(s) | | Alfonso Zamora | Mexico |
| 3rd place, bronze medalist(s) | | George Turpin | Great Britain |
| 3rd place, bronze medalist(s) | | Ricardo Carreras | United States |

The men's bantamweight event was part of the boxing programme at the 1972 Summer Olympics. The weight class allowed boxers of up to 54 kilograms to compete. The competition was held from 27 August to 10 September 1972. 38 boxers from 38 nations competed.

== Medalists ==
| Gold | Orlando Martínez; Cuba |
| Silver | Alfonso Zamora; Mexico |
| Bronze | George Turpin; Great Britain |
| Bronze | Ricardo Carreras; United States |

== Results ==
The following boxers took part in the event:

| Rank | Name | Country |
|---|---|---|
| 1 | Orlando Martínez | Cuba |
| 2 | Alfonso Zamora | Mexico |
| 3T | George Turpin | Great Britain |
| 3T | Ricardo Carreras | United States |
| 5T | John Nderu | Kenya |
| 5T | Ferry Moniaga | Indonesia |
| 5T | Vasily Solomin | Soviet Union |
| 5T | Juan Francisco Rodríguez | Spain |
| 9T | Wang Chee-yen | Chinese Taipei |
| 9T | Kim Jong-ik | North Korea |
| 9T | Mick Dowling | Ireland |
| 9T | Joe Destimo | Ghana |
| 9T | Buyangiin Ganbat | Mongolia |
| 9T | Marian Lazăr | Romania |
| 9T | Stefan Förster | East Germany |
| 9T | Go Saeng-geun | South Korea |
| 17T | Pierre Amont N'Diaye | Senegal |
| 17T | Manouchehr Bahmani | Iran |
| 17T | Eduardo Barragan | Colombia |
| 17T | Deusdete Vasconcelos | Brazil |
| 17T | Ove Lundby | Sweden |
| 17T | Win Maung | Burma |
| 17T | René Silva | Nicaragua |
| 17T | Werner Schäfer | West Germany |
| 17T | David Oleme | Cameroon |
| 17T | Mick O'Brien | Australia |
| 17T | Charndej Weerapol | Thailand |
| 17T | Flevitus Bitegeko | Tanzania |
| 17T | Ricardo Fortaleza | Philippines |
| 17T | Mayaki Seydou | Niger |
| 17T | Abdel Aziz Hammi | Tunisia |
| 17T | Aldo Cosentino | France |
| 33T | Les Hamilton | Canada |
| 33T | Mehmet Kumova | Turkey |
| 33T | Ayele Mohamed | Ethiopia |
| 33T | Leopold Agbazo | Dahomey |
| 33T | Luis Ávila | Panama |
| 33T | Józef Reszpondek | Poland |

=== First round ===
- Stefan Förster (GDR) def. Leslie Hamilton (CAN), 4:1
- Mayaki Seydou (NIG) def. Mehmet Kunova (TUR), 3:2
- Koh Keun-Sang (KOR) def. Mohamed Ayele (ETH), KO-1
- Abdelaziz Hammi (TUN) def. Leopold Agbazo (DAH), 5:0
- Juan Francisco Rodríguez (ESP) def. Luis Ávila (PAN), 5:0
- Aldo Cosentino (FRA) def. Józef Reszpondek (POL), 5:0

=== Second round ===
- George Turpin (GBR) def. Pierre Amont N'Diaye (SNG), 5:0
- Chee Yen Wang (TPE) def. Manoochehr Bahmani (IRI), 3:2
- John Mwaura Nderu (KEN) def. Eduardo Barragan (COL), 4:1
- Kim Jong-Ik (PRK) def. Deusdete Vasconselos (BRA), 4:1
- Michael Dowling (IRL) def. Ove Lundby (SWE), 4:1
- Orlando Martínez (CUB) def. Maung Win (BUR), 4:1
- Ferry Moniaga (INA) def. René Silva (NIC), 5:0
- Joe Destimo (GHA) def. Werner Schaefer (FRG), 3:2
- Buyangiin Ganbat (MGL) def. David Oleme (CMR), 5:0
- Ricardo Carreras (USA) def. Michael O'Brien (AUS), TKO-3
- Vassily Solomin (URS) def. Veepol Charndej (THA), 5:0
- Marin Lazar (ROU) def. Flevitus Bitegeko (TNZ), 5:0
- Alfonso Zamora (MEX) def. Ricardo Fortaleza (PHI), TKO-2
- Koh Keun-Sang (KOR) def. Abdelazis Hammi (TUN), 5:0
- Stefan Förster (GDR) def. Mayaki Seydou (NIG), 5:0
- Juan Francisco Rodríguez (ESP) def. Aldo Cosentino (FRA), 4:1

=== Third round ===
- George Turpin (GBR) def. Chee Yen Wang (TPE), 5:0
- John Mwaura Nderu (KEN) def. Kim Jong-Ik (PRK), 4:1
- Orlando Martínez (CUB) def. Michael Dowling (IRL), 3:2
- Ferry Moniaga (INA) def. Joe Destimo (GHA), 4:1
- Ricardo Carreras (USA) def. Buyangiin Ganbat (MGL), 3:2
- Vassily Solomin (URS) def. Marin Lazar (ROU), 4:1
- Alfonso Zamora (MEX) def. Stefan Förster (GDR), 5:0
- Juan Francisco Rodríguez (ESP) def. Koh Keun-Sang (KOR), 5:0

=== Quarterfinals ===
- George Turpin (GBR) def. John Mwaura Nderu (KEN), 4:1
- Orlando Martínez (CUB) def. Ferry Moniaga (INA), 5:0
- Ricardo Carreras (USA) def. Vassily Solomin (URS), 3:2
- Alfonso Zamora (MEX) def. Juan Francisco Rodríguez (ESP), KO-2

=== Semifinals ===
- Orlando Martínez (CUB) def. George Turpin (GBR), 3:2
- Alfonso Zamora (MEX) def. Ricardo Carreras (USA), 4:1

=== Final ===
- Orlando Martínez (CUB) def. Alfonso Zamora (MEX), 5:0
