= Boxing at the 1976 Summer Olympics – Bantamweight =

Olympic boxing tournament

Bantamweight boxing at the Games of the XXI Olympiad
- Venue: Maurice Richard Arena, Montreal
- Dates: 18–31 July 1976
- Competitors: 27 from 27 nations

Medalists
1st place, gold medalist(s)		Gu Yong-Ju	North Korea
2nd place, silver medalist(s)		Charles Mooney	United States
3rd place, bronze medalist(s)		Patrick Cowdell	Great Britain
3rd place, bronze medalist(s)		Viktor Rybakov	Soviet Union

The men's bantamweight event was part of the boxing programme at the 1976 Summer Olympics. The weight class allowed boxers of up to 54 kilograms to compete. The competition was held from 18 to 31 July 1976. 27 boxers from 27 nations competed.

== Medalists ==
Gold	Gu Yong-Ju; North Korea
Silver	Charles Mooney; United States
Bronze	Patrick Cowdell; Great Britain
Bronze	Viktor Rybakov; Soviet Union

== Results ==
The following boxers took part in the event:

Rank	Name	Country
1	Gu Yong-Ju	North Korea
2	Charles Mooney	United States
3T	Patrick Cowdell	Great Britain
3T	Viktor Rybakov	Soviet Union
5T	Rey Fortaleza	Philippines
5T	Stefan Förster	East Germany
5T	Veerachat Saturngrum	Thailand
5T	Hwang Cheol-sun	South Korea
9T	Tsacho Andreykovski	Bulgaria
9T	Orlando Martínez	Cuba
9T	Alejandro Silva	Puerto Rico
9T	Chris Ius	Canada
9T	Hitoshi Ishigaki	Japan
9T	Bernardo Onori	Italy
15T	Leszek Borkowski	Poland
15T	Aldo Cosentino	France
15T	Kemal Solunur	Turkey
15T	Francisco Sánchez	Dominican Republic
15T	Jovito Rengifo	Venezuela
15T	Juan Francisco Rodríguez	Spain
15T	Faredin Ibrahim	Romania
15T	József Jakab	Hungary
15T	Tumat Sogolik	Papua New Guinea
15T	Brian Tink	Australia
25T	Mohamed Rais	Morocco
25T	Thanasis Khouliaras	Greece
25T	Abdel Nabi El-Sayed Mahran	Egypt

=== First round ===
- Jovito Rengifo (VEN) def. Baker Muwanga (UGA), 5:0
- Chul Soon-Hwang (KOR) def. Anthony Houliaras (GRE), 5:0
- Tumat Sogolik (PNG) def. Samuel Meck (CMR), walk-over
- Charles Mooney (USA) def. Mohamed Rais (MAR), 5:0
- Juan Francisco Rodríguez (ESP) def. Anthony Abacheng (GHA), 5:0
- Bernardo Onori (ITA) def. Abdelnabi El-Sayed (EGY), 5:0
- Brian Tink (AUS) def. Giubran Zugdani (LIB), walk-over

=== Second round ===
- Rey Fortaleza (PHI) def. Evan Parris (GUY), walk-over
- Ekenwa Ezikpe (NGA) – Costo Assogba (TOG), both walk-over
- Patrick Cowdell (GBR) def. Leszek Borkowski (POL), 5:0
- Alejandro Silva (PUR) def. George Findo (KEN), walk-over
- Chacho Andreykovski (BUL) def. Aldo Cosentino (FRA), KO-3
- Gu Yong-Ju (PRK) def. Faredin Ibrahim (ROM), 4:1
- Weerachart Saturngrun (THA) def. Kemal Sonunur (TUR), 5:0
- Chris Ius (CAN) def. Mohamed Ayele (ETH), walk-over
- Zassia Ouaudrogo (BUR) – Hamidou Banhamni (NIG), both walk-over
- Stephan Förster (GDR) def. Jozsef Jakab (HUN), 5:0
- Hitoshi Ishigaki (JPN) def. Francisco Sanchez (DOM), DSQ-2
- Viktor Rybakov (URS) def. Alfred Siame (ZAM), walk-over
- Orlando Martínez (CUB) def. Jovito Rengifo (VEN), 5:0
- Chul Soon-Hwang (KOR) def. Tumat Sogolik (PNG), KO-2
- Charles Mooney (USA) def. Juan Francisco Rodríguez (ESP), 4:1
- Bernardo Onori (ITA) def. Brian Tink (AUS), 5:0

=== Third round ===
- Rey Fortaleza (PHI) – no opponent (bye)
- Patrick Cowdell (GBR) def. Alejandro Silva (PUR), 5:0
- Gu Yong-Ju (PRK) def. Chacho Andreykovski (BUL), 5:0
- Weerachart Saturngrun (THA) def. Chris Ius (CAN), 5:0
- Stephan Förster (GDR) – no opponent (bye)
- Viktor Rybakov (URS) def. Hitoshi Ishigaki (JPN), 5:0
- Chul Soon-Hwang (KOR) def. Orlando Martínez (CUB), 3:2
- Charles Mooney (USA) def. Bernardo Onori (ITA), 5:0

=== Quarterfinals ===
- Patrick Cowdell (GBR) def. Rey Fortaleza (PHI), 4:1
- Gu Yong-Ju (PRK) def. Weerachart Saturngrun (THA), 5:0
- Viktor Rybakov (URS) def. Stephan Förster (GDR), 3:2
- Charles Mooney (USA) def. Chul Soon-Hwang (KOR), 3:2

=== Semifinals ===
- Gu Yong-Ju (PRK) def. Patrick Cowdell (GBR), 4:1
- Charles Mooney (USA) def. Viktor Rybakov (URS), 4:1

=== Final ===
- Gu Yong-Ju (PRK) def. Charles Mooney (USA), 5:0
