= Boxing at the 1972 Summer Olympics – Welterweight =

Olympic boxing tournament

Welterweight boxing at the Games of the XX Olympiad
- Venue: Boxing Hall, Munich
- Dates: 28 August – 10 September 1972
- Competitors: 37 from 37 nations

Medalists
1st place, gold medalist(s)		Emilio Correa	Cuba
2nd place, silver medalist(s)		János Kajdi	Hungary
3rd place, bronze medalist(s)		Dick Murunga	Kenya
3rd place, bronze medalist(s)		Jesse Valdez	United States

The men's welterweight event was part of the boxing programme at the 1972 Summer Olympics. The weight class allowed boxers of up to 67 kilograms to compete. The competition was held from 28 August to 10 September 1972. 37 boxers from 37 nations competed.

== Medalists ==
Gold	Emilio Correa; Cuba
Silver	János Kajdi; Hungary
Bronze	Dick Murunga; Kenya
Bronze	Jesse Valdez; United States

== Results ==
The following boxers took part in the event:

Rank	Name	Country
1	Emilio Correa	Cuba
2	János Kajdi	Hungary
3T	Dick Murunga	Kenya
3T	Jesse Valdez	United States
5T	Maurice Hope	Great Britain
5T	Sergio Lozano	Mexico
5T	Günther Meier	West Germany
5T	Anatoly Khokhlov	Soviet Union
9T	Alfonso Fernández	Spain
9T	Damdinjavyn Bandi	Mongolia
9T	Wayne Devlin	Australia
9T	Vartex Parsanian	Iran
9T	Manfred Wolke	East Germany
9T	Rabieb Sangnual	Thailand
9T	John Rodgers	Ireland
9T	David Jackson	Uganda
17T	Hakkı Sözen	Turkey
17T	Garry Davis	Bahamas
17T	Emma Ankudey	Ghana
17T	James Vrij	Netherlands
17T	Mirgaani Gomaa Rizgalla	Sudan
17T	Joe Mensah	Nigeria
17T	Mbwana Mkanga	Tanzania
17T	Alfons Stawski	Poland
17T	Damiano Lassandro	Italy
17T	Panagiotis Therianos	Greece
17T	Jeff Rackley	New Zealand
17T	Karl Gschwind	Switzerland
17T	Julio Medina	Chile
17T	Ib Bøtcher	Denmark
17T	Vladimir Kolev	Bulgaria
17T	Carlos Burga	Peru
33T	Nicolas Ortíz	Puerto Rico
33T	Abdel Hamid Fouad Gad	Egypt
33T	Victor Zilberman	Romania
33T	Ketil Hodne	Norway
33T	Komlan Kalipe	Togo

=== First round ===
- Ib Bøtcher (DEN) def. Nicolas Ortiz Flores (PUR), 3:2
- Vladimir Kolev (BUL) def. Abdelhamid Fouad Gad (EGY), 5:0
- David Jackson (UGA) def. Victor Zilberman (ROU), 3:2
- Carlos Burga (PER) def. Ketil Hodne (NOR), 4:1
- Jesse Valdez (USA) def. Kolman Kalipe (TOG), 5:0

=== Second round ===
- Alfonso Fernández (ESP) def. Hakki Sözen (TUR), 4:1
- Maurice Hope (GBR) def. Garry Davis (BAH), 5:0
- Damdinjavyn Bandi (MGL) def. Emma Flash Ankoudey (GHA), 3:2
- János Kajdi (HUN) def. James Vrij (HOL), 4:1
- Kerry Devlin (AUS) def. Mirgaani Gomaa Rizgalla (SUD), TKO-3
- Sergio Lozano (MEX) def. Joe Mensah (NGR), 5:0
- Vartex Parsanian (IRI) def. Mbaraka Mkanga (TNZ), 5:0
- Richard Murunga (KEN) def. Alfons Stawski (POL), 4:1
- Emilio Correa (CUB) def. Damiano Lassandro (ITA), 5:0
- Manfred Wolke (GDR) def. Panayotis Therianos (GRE), 4:1
- Günther Meier (FRG) def. Jeff Rackley (NZL), 5:0
- Sangnual Rabieb (THA) def. Karl Gschwind (SUI), 5:0
- Anatoliy Khokhlov (URS) def. Julio Medina (CHI), TKO-3
- John Rodgers (IRL) def. Ib Bøtcher (DEN), TKO-3
- David Jackson (UGA) def. Vladimir Kolev (BUL), 4:1
- Jesse Valdez (USA) def. Carlos Burga (PER), 4:1

=== Third round ===
- Maurice Hope (GBR) def. Alfonso Fernández (ESP), walk-over
- János Kajdi (HUN) def. Damdinjavyn Bandi (MGL), KO-2
- Sergio Lozano (MEX) def. Kerry Devlin (AUS), 4:1
- Richard Murunga (KEN) def. Vartex Parsanian (IRI), TKO-3
- Emilio Correa (CUB) def. Manfred Wolke (GDR), TKO-2
- Günther Meier (FRG) def. Sangnual Rabieb (THA), 5:0
- Anatoliy Khokhlov (URS) def. John Rodgers (IRL), 5:0
- Jesse Valdez (USA) def. David Jackson (UGA), 4:1

=== Quarterfinals ===
- János Kajdi (HUN) def. Maurice Hope (GBR), 5:0
- Richard Murunga (KEN) def. Sergio Lozano (MEX), KO-1
- Emilio Correa (CUB) def. Günther Meier (FRG), 3:2
- Jesse Valdez (USA) def. Anatoly Khohlov (URS), 5:0

=== Semifinals ===
- János Kajdi (HUN) def. Richard Murunga (KEN), 4:1
- Emilio Correa (CUB) def. Jesse Valdez (USA), 3:2

=== Final ===
- Emilio Correa (CUB) def. János Kajdi (HUN), 5:0
