= Indonesia at the 1972 Summer Olympics =

- IOC code: INA
- NOC: Indonesian Olympic Committee

in Munich
- Competitors: 6 in 5 sports
- Flag bearer: Wiem Gommies
- Medals: Gold 0 Silver 0 Bronze 0 Total 0

Summer Olympics appearances (overview)
- 1952; 1956; 1960; 1964; 1968; 1972; 1976; 1980; 1984; 1988; 1992; 1996; 2000; 2004; 2008; 2012; 2016; 2020; 2024

Indonesia competed at the 1972 Summer Olympics in Munich, West Germany.

== Competitors ==
The following is the list of number of competitors participating in the Games:

Sport	Men	Women	Total
Archery	0	1	1
Athletics	0	1	1
Boxing	2	0	2
Diving	0	1	1
Weightlifting	1	0	1
Total	3	3	6

== Archery ==
Women's Individual Competition

- Tjoeij Lin Alienilin - 2100 points (37th place)

== Athletics ==
Key

- Note–Ranks given for track events are within the athlete's heat only
- Q = Qualified for the next round
- q = Qualified for the next round as a fastest loser or, in field events, by position without achieving the qualifying target
- NR = National record
- N/A = Round not applicable for the event
- Bye = Athlete not required to compete in round

Men's Track
Athlete	Event	Heat		Quarterfinal		Semifinal		Final	
Athlete	Event	Result	Rank	Result	Rank	Result	Rank	Result	Rank
Carolina Rieuwpassa	Women's 100 metres	12.23	6	Did not advance					
Carolina Rieuwpassa	Women's 200 metres	24.68	6	25.03	7	Did not advance			

== Boxing ==
Athlete	Event	Round of 64	Round of 32	Round of 16	Quarterfinals	Semifinals	Final	
Athlete	Event	Opposition Result	Opposition Result	Opposition Result	Opposition Result	Opposition Result	Opposition Result	Rank
Ferry Moniaga	Bantamweight	—N/a	Silva (NIC); W 5–0	Destimo (GHA); W 4–1	Martínez (CUB); L 0–5	Did not advance		
Wiem Gommies	Bantamweight	—N/a	Lemeshev (URS); L KO-1	Did not advance				

== Diving ==
Women's 3m Springboard

- Mirnawati Hardjolukito - 188.94 points (30th place)

== Weightlifting ==
Athlete	Event	Military press		Snatch		Clean & jerk		Total	Rank
Athlete	Event	Result	Rank	Result	Rank	Result	Rank	Total	Rank
Charles Depthios	Flyweight	95	=11	90	=10	125	=3	310	9

== See also ==
- 1972 Paralympic Games
- Indonesia at the Olympics
- Indonesia at the Paralympics
