= Boxing at the 1971 Mediterranean Games =

- Location: İzmir, Turkey
- Dates: 6–17 October 1971

The boxing events of the 1971 Mediterranean Games were held in İzmir, Turkey.

== Medalists ==
Event	Gold	Silver	Bronze
Light Flyweight (–48 kg)	Enrique Rodríguez (ESP)	Said Ahmed El-Ashry (EGY)	Farouk Ramzi (SYR) Arif Doğru (TUR)
Flyweight (–51 kg)	Ali Gharbi (TUN)	Mohamed El sayed (EGY)	Panagiotis Solomos (GRE) Mohamed Fazzai (MAR)
Bantamweight (–54 kg)	Mehmet Kunova (TUR)	Abdel Aziz Hammi (TUN)	Juan Francisco Rodríguez (ESP) Domingo Onésime (FRA)
Featherweight (–57 kg)	Mohamed Salah Amin (EGY)	Mouldi Manai (TUN)	Christos Kakouris (GRE) Pasqualino Morbidelli (ITA)
Lightweight (–60 kg)	Abdel Hady Khallaf Allah (EGY)	Seyfi Tatar (TUR)	Franco Veroli (ITA) Mohamed Sourour (MAR)
Light Welterweight (–63.5 kg)	Giambattista Capretti (ITA)	Eraslan Doruk (TUR)	Fawzi Hassan (EGY) Jean-Pierre Younsi (FRA)
Welterweight (–67 kg)	Celal Sandal (TUR)	Alfonso Fernández (ESP)	Mahmud Ibrahim Mahran (EGY) Damiano Lassandro (ITA)
Light Middleweight (–71 kg)	Fouad Ali Abdelhamid (EGY)	Mohamed Majeri (TUN)	Antonio Castellini (ITA) Panagiotis Therianos (GRE)
Middleweight (–75 kg)	Dragomir Vujković (YUG)	Giovanni Malandra (ITA)	Athanasios Giannopoulos (GRE) Hikmet Özen (TUR)
Light Heavyweight (–81 kg)	Mahmoud Ali Mohamed (EGY)	Radoslav Zunjanin (YUG)	Guglielmo Grando (ITA) José Garval Vasquez (ESP)
Heavyweight (+81 kg)	Gülali Özbey (TUR)	Nenad Matejić (YUG)	Amedeo Lauretti (ITA) Ibrahim Eldahshan Talaat (EGY)

== Medal table ==
Rank	Nation	Gold	Silver	Bronze	Total
1	Egypt (EGY)	4	2	3	9
2	Turkey (TUR)	3	2	2	7
3	Tunisia (TUN)	1	3	0	4
4	Yugoslavia (YUG)	1	2	0	3
5	Italy (ITA)	1	1	6	8
6	Spain (ESP)	1	1	2	4
7	Greece (GRE)	0	0	4	4
8	France (FRA)	0	0	2	2
8	Morocco (MAR)	0	0	2	2
10	Syria (SYR)	0	0	1	1
Totals (10 entries)		11	11	22	44
