= Sözen =

Sözen is a Turkish surname. Notable people with the surname include:

- Can Sözen, Turkish audio engineer
- Edibe Sözen (born 1961), Turkish politician
- Elif Sözen-Kohl (born 1969) Turkish-born banker
- Gürol Sözen (born 1940), Turkish artist
- Hakkı Sözen (born 1950), Turkish boxer
- Kadir Sözen (born 1964), German-Turkish journalist
- Melisa Sözen (born 1985), Turkish actress
- Mustafa Sözen, Turkishzoologist
- Nurettin Sözen (born 1937), Turkish physician
- Suzan Sözen, Turkish writer
- Umut Sözen (born 1990), Turkish footballer
- Mete Sözen (1930–2018), Turkish-born architect
- Metin Sözen (1936–2025), Turkish architect
