= Boxing at the 1974 Central American and Caribbean Games =

Boxing competitions

Boxing at the 1974 Central American and Caribbean Games was held in Santo Domingo, Dominican Republic from March 3 to March 9, 1974.

== Medal winners ==
Event	Gold	Silver	Bronze
-48 kg	Jorge Hernández (CUB)	Fausto García (MEX)	Virgilio Palomo (COL); Francisco Sánchez (DOM)
-51 kg	Alfredo Pérez (VEN)	Alejandro Pérez (DOM)	Freddy Hernández (COL); Juan Solís (PUR)
-54 kg	Wilfredo Gómez (PUR)	Jóvito Rengifo (VEN)	Orlando Martínez (CUB); Celestino Molina (MEX)
-57 kg	Óscar Arnal (VEN)	Gerardo Aceves (MEX)	Mariano Álvarez (CUB); Hugo Nátera (DOM)
-60 kg	Orlando Palacios (CUB)	José Luis Vellón (PUR)	Yves Jeudy (HAI); Teodoro Ozuna (DOM)
-63.5 kg	Pedro José Gamarro (VEN)	Ladislao Alonso (PAN)	Reggie Ford (GUY); Amador Rosario (PUR)
-67 kg	Emilio Correa (CUB)	Mike McCallum (JAM)	Sergio Lozano (MEX); Pedro Rojas (VEN)
-71 kg	Rolando Garbey (CUB)	Emeterio Villanueva (MEX)	Alejandro García (DOM); Nathaniel Jones (TTO)
-75 kg	Alejandro Montoya (CUB)	Steve Larrimore (BAH)	Félix Lauser (PUR); Rosalbo Ochoa (VEN)
-81 kg	Ernesto Sánchez (VEN)	Luis Valier (CUB)	Bernardo Mercado (COL); Gilberto Vega (PUR)
+81 kg	Teófilo Stevenson (CUB)	Carlos Rivera (VEN)	Rafael Vega (CRC); Francisco Saviñón (DOM)
