= Jesse Valdez =

American boxer

Personal information
- Full name: Jesus Valdez
- Born: December 7, 1947 (age 78) Houston, Texas, U.S.
- Height: 5 ft 9 in (175 cm)
- Weight: 148 lb (67 kg)

Sport
- Sport: Boxing
- Weight class: Welterweight
Medal record
Men's boxing
Representing the United States
Olympic Games
Bronze medal – third place	1972 Munich	Welterweight -67 kg
Pan American Games
Bronze medal – third place	1967 Winnipeg	Welterweight -67 kg

Jesus "Jesse" Valdez (born December 7, 1947) is a retired boxer. He was selected a member of the All-American AAU boxing team for 1973, and was named the top welterweight amateur boxer in the nation in 1973 by the National AAU Boxing Committee.

== Amateur career ==
At sixteen years-old, Valdez won the National AAU Welterweight Championship in 1964 by upsetting Olympic bronze medalist Quincey Daniels. That same year, he qualified for the U.S. Olympic team as an alternate. In 1967, he won a bronze medal at the Pan-American Games. Valdez also won the National AAU Light Middleweight Championship in 1970, while boxing out of the Air Force. In 1967 he was the National Golden Gloves Light middleweight champion and in 1972 he was the National Golden Gloves Welterweight Champion. The Jesse Valdez Fan club was started by Rudy Ramirez.

In 1972, Valdez, who is of Mexican-American descent, qualified for the U.S. national team by defeating future world light-heavyweight champion Eddie Mustafa Muhammad. At the, 1972 Munich Olympic games, Valdez was eliminated from the finals by eventual gold medalist Emilio Correa in a disputed split decision. Valdez would go on to win a bronze medal.

=== 1972 Olympic results ===
Below is the record of Jesse Valdez, an American welterweight boxer who competed at the 1972 Munich Olympics:

- Round of 64: Defeated Kolman Kalipe (Togo) by unanimous decision, 5–0
- Round of 32: Defeated Carlos Burga (Peru) by majority decision, 4–1
- Round of 16: Defeated David Jackson (Uganda) by majority decision, 4–1
- Quarterfinal: Defeated Anatoly Khohlov (Soviet Union) by unanimous decision, 5–0
- Semifinal: Lost to Emilio Correa (Cuba) by split decision, 2–3 (was awarded bronze medal)

Valdez never turned pro after his impressive amateur career but remained in the Air Force as a career military man.
