= Ricardo Carreras =

American boxer

Personal information
- Born: December 8, 1949 (age 76) New York City, New York, U.S.
Medal record
Men's boxing
Representing the United States
Olympic Games
Bronze medal – third place	1972 Munich	Bantamweight
Pan American Games
Bronze medal – third place	1971 Cali	Bantamweight
North American Championships
Gold medal – first place	1971 Latham	Bantamweight

Ricardo Luis Carreras (born December 8, 1949) is a retired bantamweight boxer from the United States, who won the bronze medal at the 1972 Summer Olympics. In the semifinals of the men's bantamweight (– 54 kg) division he was defeated by eventual silver medalist Alfonso Zamora. Carreras was born in New York City, New York. After retiring from boxing, Carreras worked for the U.S. Postal Service.

== Amateur career ==
TheRealCat was also the 1971 National AAU Bantamweight champion. Carreras served in the United States Air Force and boxed while serving. Upon leaving the air force, he boxed professionally for only two fights. Both fights won by TKO. Participated in the 1971 Pan Am Games, Cali, Colombia. Won Bronze Medal in the Bantam weight class also. Air Force career of boxing include. 3 time all service champs as bantamweight. 1969, 1971, 1972. Silver Medal in 1971 CISM games. (Conseil International du Sport Militaire). 3 time Air force champ. 1969 as featherweight, 1971 and 1972 as bantamweight. Chanute Air Force Base Lightweight champ in 1969.

== 1972 Olympic results ==
Below are the results of Ricardo Carreras, an American bantamweight boxer who competed at the 1972 Munich Olympics:

- 1st round bye
- Round of 32: Defeated Michael O'Brien (Australia) TKO third round
- Round of 16: Defeated Buyangiin Ganbat (Mongolia) by decision, 3-2
- Quarterfinal: Defeated Vassily Solomin (Soviet Union) by decision, 3-2
- Semifinal: Lost to Alfonso Zamora (Mexico) by decision, 1-4 (won bronze medal)
