= Jakab =

Jakab is the Hungarian equivalent of the given name James.

Jakab may refer to:

- Jakab Industries, former Australian coachbuilder
- Jakab-hegy (James's Hill), a mountain in Hungary

== People with the surname ==
- Andrea Jakab (born 1981), Romanian speed skater
- Dávid Jakab (born 1993), Hungarian footballer
- Dezső Jakab (1864-1932), Hungarian architect
- Irene Jakab (1919-2011), Hungarian-born American psychiatrist and humanist
- István Jakab (born 1949), Hungarian agronomist and politician
- János Jakab (born 1986), Hungarian table tennis player
- József Jakab (born 1954), Hungarian boxer
- Judit Jakab (born 1989), Swiss basketball player
- Péter Jakab (born 1980), Hungarian politician
- Réka Jakab (born 1987), Hungarian footballer
- Vilmos Jakab (1952–2024), Hungarian boxer
- Zsuzsanna Jakab (born 1951), Hungarian public health expert

== See also ==
- Includes people with first name Jakab
