= Luis Ávila =

Panamanian boxer (born 1948)

Personal information
- Nationality: Panamanian
- Born: 6 December 1948 (age 76)

Sport
- Sport: Boxing

Luis Ávila (born 6 December 1948) is a Panamanian boxer. He competed in the men's bantamweight event at the 1972 Summer Olympics. In his opening fight, he lost to Juan Francisco Rodríguez of Spain.
