= Lassandro =

Lassandro is a surname. Notable people with the surname include:

- Damiano Lassandro (born 1947), Italian boxer
- Florence Lassandro (1900–1923), Italian-Canadian bootlegger
