= Jovito Rengifo =

Venezuelan boxer

Personal information
- Nationality: Venezuelan
- Born: 15 January 1953 (age 73)
- Height: 166 cm (5 ft 5 in)
Medal record
Men's boxing
Representing Venezuela
Central American and Caribbean Games
Silver medal – second place	1974 Santo Domingo	-54 kg

Jovito Rengifo (born 15 January 1953) is a Venezuelan former professional boxer who competed from 1977 to 1983 As an amateur, he competed in the men's bantamweight event at the 1976 Summer Olympics, where he defeated Baker Muwanga of Uganda in his first fight before losing to Orlando Martínez of Cuba.

== Professional record ==
Rengifo built an undefeated record of 25–0 before he challenged Rafael Orono for the WBC's world Junior Bantamweight title, in the first world championship fight ever between two Venezuelans, on 15 September 1980 at the Domo Bolivariano in the Venezuelan city of Barquisimeto. He lost the fight by third-round knockout. In his next contest, Rengifo lost a ten-round decision to Alfonso Lopez, on 1 December 1980.

Rengifo's next world title challenge was for Lupe Pintor's WBC world Bantamweight title; this contest took place on 26 July 1981 in a fight that took place at the Showboat Hotel and Casino in Las Vegas, Nevada and was televised nationally to the United States. Rengifo lost by eighth-round knockout. Rengifo also lost to Kiko Bejines, by a ten rounds decision on 5 March 1982 at the Olympic Auditorium in Los Angeles, California.

Rengifo retired from professional boxing with a record of 35 wins, 4 losses and one draw (tie) in 40 contests, with 16 wins and 2 losses by knockout.
