= Józef Reszpondek =

Polish boxer

Personal information
- Nationality: Polish
- Born: 17 March 1951; Łódź, Poland
- Died: 21 April 2002 (aged 51); Łódź, Poland

Sport
- Sport: Boxing

Józef Reszpondek (17 March 1951 – 21 April 2002) was a Polish boxer. He competed in the men's bantamweight event at the 1972 Summer Olympics. In his first fight, he lost to Aldo Cosentino of France. At the 1972 Summer Olympics, he lost in his first fight to Aldo Cosentino of France.
