= Win Maung (disambiguation) =

Win Maung may refer to:

- Mahn Win Maung (1916–1989), third president of the Union of Burma (Myanmar)
- Win Maung (boxer) (born 1946), Burmese boxer
- Win Maung (footballer) (born 1949), Burmese footballer
