= Emilio Correa =

Emilio Correa may refer to:

- Emilio Correa (boxer born 1953), Cuban Olympic boxer, 1972 and 1976
- Emilio Correa (boxer born 1985), his son, Cuban Olympic boxer, 2008
