= Viktor Rybakov =

Russian boxer (born 1956)

Medal record

Men's Boxing

Representing the Soviet Union

Olympic Games
Bronze medal – third place	1976 Montreal	Bantamweight
Bronze medal – third place	1980 Moscow	Featherweight

European Amateur Championships
Gold medal – first place	1975 Katowice	Bantamweight
Bronze medal – third place	1977 Halle	Featherweight
Gold medal – first place	1979 Cologne	Featherweight
Gold medal – first place	1981 Tampere	Lightweight

Viktor Grigorievich Rybakov (Russian: Виктор Григорьевич Рыбаков) (born May 28, 1956, in Magadan) is a retired boxer, who represented the USSR twice at the Summer Olympics during his career as an Olympian. He won the bronze medal in the bantamweight division (– 54 kg) at the 1976 Summer Olympics in Montreal, Quebec, Canada, and repeated that feat four years later in Moscow, Soviet Union. He trained at the Trud Sports Society until 1976. Later he trained at the Armed Forces sports society.

== Olympic results ==
Below are the Olympic results of Viktor Rybakov, a boxer from the Soviet Union who competed at both the 1976 Olympics in Montreal and the 1980 Olympics in Moscow:

Montreal - 1976 Viktor Rybakov competed as a bantamweight in this tournament:

- Round of 64: bye
- Round of 32: Defeated Alfred Siame (Zambia) by walkover
- Round of 16: Defeated Hitoshi Ishigaki (Japan) by decision, 5–0
- Quarterfinal: Defeated Stephan Förster (East Germany) by decision, 3–2
- Semifinal: Lost to Charles Mooney (United States) by decision, 1–4

Moscow - 1980 Viktor Rybakov competed as a featherweight in this tournament:

- Round of 64: bye
- Round of 32: Defeated Daniel Londas (France) by decision, 5–0
- Round of 16: Defeated Peter Hanlon (Great Britain) by decision, 5–0
- Quarterfinal: Defeated Tzacho Andreikowski (Bulgaria) by decision, 4–1
- Semifinal: Lost to Rudi Fink (East Germany) by decision, 1-4
