= Hwang Chul-soon =

Korean male boxer

Hwang Chul-soon 황철순
Personal information
- Full name: Hwang Chul-soon
- Nationality: South Korean
- Born: September 13, 1957 (age 69) Goseong County, South Gyeongsang, South Korea
- Height: 1.78 m (5 ft 10 in)

Sport
- Sport: Boxing
- Weight class: Bantamweight
Medal record
Asian Games
Gold medal – first place	1978 Bangkok	Bantamweight
Silver medal – second place	1974 Teheran	Flyweight
Asian Championships
Gold medal – first place	1977 Jakarta	Bantamweight
Silver medal – second place	1980 Bombay	Bantamweight
Bronze medal – third place	1973 Bangkok	Flyweight
World Cup
Silver medal – second place	1979 New York	Bantamweight

- Hwang Chul-soon
- Hangul: 황철순
- RR: Hwang Cheolsun
- MR: Hwang Ch'ŏlsun

Hwang Chul-soon (Korean: 황철순;) is a South Korean former boxer who competed as a bantam-weight (54-kg class) in the 1976 Summer Olympics. Hwang lost his fourth fight, the quarter-final match, to eventual silver-medalist Charles Mooney.

== Amateur career ==
Hwang first garnered attention at the 1974 Asian Games where he won the silver medal in flyweight by losing to future Olympic champion Gu Yong-ju of North Korea in the final.

At the 1976 Summer Olympics in Montreal, Hwang pulled off a major upset in bantamweight when he beat reigning Olympic champion Orlando Martínez of Cuba in Round of 16. He, however, lost to eventual silver medalist Charles Mooney of United States by unanimous decision in the quarterfinal match.

In 1979 Hwang won the silver medal in bantamweight at the inaugural Boxing World Cup in New York City after losing to 1978 Golden Gloves winner Jackie Beard in the final.

=== Results ===
1976 Summer Olympics
Event	Round	Result	Opponent	Score
Bantamweight	First	Win	(Greece) Athanasios Khouliaras	5-0
Bantamweight	Second	Win	(Papua New Guinea) Tumat Sogolik	KO 3
Bantamweight	Third	Win	(Cuba) Orlando Martínez	3-2
Bantamweight	Quarterfinal	Loss	(United States) Charles Mooney	0-5

== Pro career ==
Hwang earned a spot on the 1980 South Korean Olympic team. However, as South Korea boycotted the 1980 Summer Olympics in Moscow due to political reasons, Hwang and the rest of his team were not allowed an Olympic berth.

Hwang subsequently turned pro in early 1980 and had limited success. He retired in 1982 having won 5 with 1 KO.
