= Patrick Cowdell =

English boxer (born 1953)

Pat Cowdell
Personal information
- Full name: Patrick Cowdell
- Born: 18 August 1953 (age 72) Smethwick, Staffordshire, England
Medal record
Men's Boxing
Representing Great Britain
Olympic Games
Bronze medal – third place	1976 Montreal	Bantamweight
Representing England
European Amateur Championships
Bronze medal – third place	1975 Katowice	Featherweight
Commonwealth Games
Gold medal – first place	1974 Christchurch	Bantamweight

Patrick Cowdell (born 18 August 1953) is a British former boxer. He challenged twice for the WBC world featherweight title in 1981 and 1985.

== Amateur career ==
Cowdell won the bronze medal in the bantamweight division (– 54 kg) at the 1976 Summer Olympics in Montreal, Quebec, Canada. In the semi-finals he was beaten by eventual gold medalist Gu Yong-Ju from North Korea.

Two years earlier Cowdell won the gold medal, at the 1974 Commonwealth Games in Christchurch, New Zealand. He was a bronze medalist at the 1975 European Amateur Boxing Championships held in Katowice, Poland. He was also the 1973 ABA bantamweight champion, lightweight in 1975, and featherweight champion in 1976 and 1977.

=== 1976 Olympic results ===
- Round of 64: bye
- Round of 32: Defeated Leszek Borkowski (Poland) by decision, 5–0
- Round of 16: Defeated Alejandro Silva (Puerto Rico) by decision, 5–0
- Quarterfinal: Defeated Reynaldo Fortaleza (Philippines) by decision, 4–1
- Semifinal: Lost to Gu Yong-Ju (North Korea) by decision, 1–4 (was awarded bronze medal)

== Professional career ==
Cowdell turned pro in 1977 and in 1981 took on WBC world featherweight champion Salvador Sánchez, losing a close and hard-fought split decision in which Cowdell was dropped in round 15. In 1985 Cowdell challenged Azumah Nelson for the WBC featherweight title, but was caught cold by a bullet of a punch and knocked out in the first round. He fought on but retired in 1988 after being stopped by Welshman Floyd Havard. He finished up with stats of 36–6–0 (18 KOs) that included spells as British, Commonwealth and European Champion.

== Life after boxing ==
Pat runs four professional dinner shows a year at the Burlington Hotel in Birmingham's city centre. In February 2007, Cowdell returned to putting shows on at the Burlington after a three-year hiatus at the Holiday Inn – also in the centre of Birmingham.

He also trains/trained a band of fighters that include Bedworth's former Midland Area super-middleweight champion Neil Tidman, Leamington Spa's Richard Mazurek, and Coventry foursome Dougie Walton, Sean McKervey, Joe McCluskey and John Ruddock. Cowdell's most famous pupil, Birmingham-based gypsy Jimmy Vincent, twice challenged for the British title before retiring in 2005.

== See also ==
- List of British featherweight boxing champions
