= Alfons Stawski =

Polish boxer

Personal information
- Nationality: Polish
- Born: 1 January 1945 (age 80); Zgniłobłoty, Poland

Sport
- Sport: Boxing

Alfons Stawski (born 1 January 1945) is a Polish boxer. He competed in the men's welterweight event at the 1972 Summer Olympics. At the 1972 Summer Olympics, he lost to Richard Murunga of Kenya.
