= Alfonso Zamora =

Mexican boxer (born 1954)

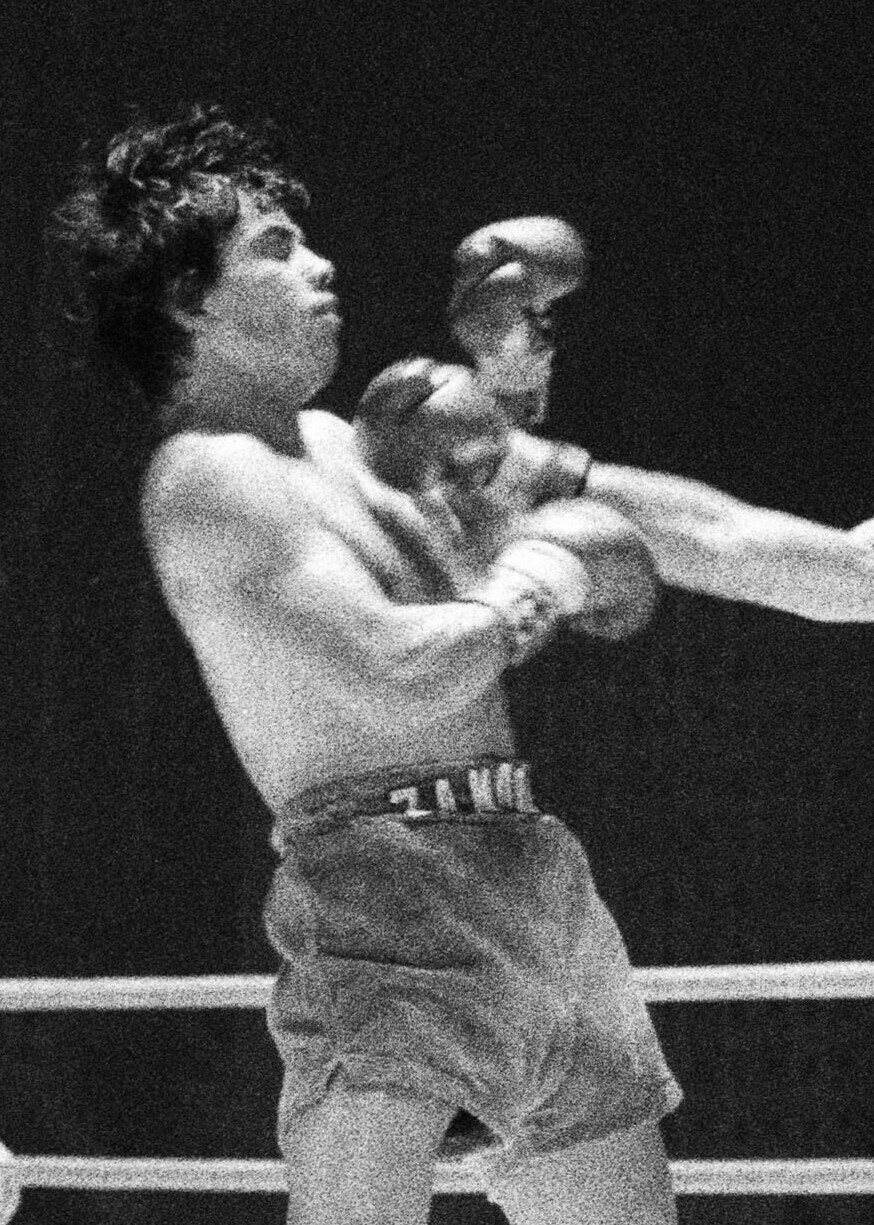
- Zamora in 1976

Personal information
- Nickname: El Toro
- Born: Alfonso Zamora Quiroz; 9 February 1954 (age 72) Mexico City, Mexico
- Height: 5 ft 4 in (163 cm)
- Weight: Bantamweight

Boxing career
- Reach: 68 in (173 cm)
- Stance: Orthodox

Boxing record
- Total fights: 38
- Wins: 33
- Win by KO: 32
- Losses: 5
Medal record
Men's Boxing
Representing Mexico
Olympic Games
Silver medal – second place	1972 Munich	Bantamweight

Alfonso Zamora Quiroz (born 9 February 1954) is a Mexican former professional boxer who competed from 1973 to 1980. He was the Lineal and WBA bantamweight champion, and made five title defenses. As an amateur, he won a silver medal in the bantamweight event at the 1972 Munich Olympics.

== Amateur career ==
Bantamweight silver medalist at the 1972 Summer Olympics in Munich. Results were:

- Defeated Ricardo Fortaleza (Philippines) KO 2
- Defeated Stefan Forster (West Germany) points
- Defeated Juan Francisco Rodríguez (Spain) KO 3
- Defeated Ricardo Carreras (U.S.) points
- Lost to Orlando Martinez (Cuba) points

== Professional career ==
=== World Bantamweight Championship ===
He won the Lineal and WBA Bantamweight title on 14 March 1975 when he knocked out Soo-Hwan Hong in four rounds, two years after turning pro. Zamora defended his title twice that year via knockout, against Thanomchit Sukhothai and Socrates Batoto. On 3 April 1976, he knocked out future hall-of-famer Eusebio Pedroza in the second round. Later that year, he successfully defended his title via knockout against Gilberto Illueca and a rematch with Soo-Hwan Hong.

=== Zamora vs. Zarate ===
Fighting contemporaneously, and holding the WBC crown, was the fellow-Mexican legend, Carlos Zárate Serna. A showdown between the two was inevitable and they met in a non-title match on 23 April 1977. Zamora went into the bout sporting a record of 29 wins in 29 fights, all by knockout. Zarate's record was an equally impressive 45 fights, 45 wins, with 44 KOs. In a largely anticipated fight Zarate scored a technical knockout over Zamora in the fourth round.

Zamora never seemed to recover from this loss. In his next fight he lost his Lineal and WBA Bantamweight titles to Jorge Luján by knockout in the tenth round. His record thereafter was spotty, and he even was stopped on 16 November 1979 by Eddie Logan, who sported a record of 5 wins and 7 losses. He retired after losing, again by knockout, to Rigoberto Estrada on 19 September 1980. In 1983, Zamora was to fight Wilfredo Gómez, the fight ultimately was canceled.

Zamora was a knockout seeker, but he seemed to lose confidence after his devastating loss to Zarate. Nevertheless, he was selected at Number 47 on The Ring's list of 100 greatest punchers of all time. His final career record included 33 wins, with 32 KOs, and 5 losses.

== Professional boxing record ==
38 fights	33 wins	5 losses
By knockout	32	4
By decision	1	0
By disqualification	0	1

No.	Result	Record	Opponent	Type	Round, time	Date	Location	Notes
38	Loss	33–5	(Mexico) Rigoberto Estrada	TKO	3 (10)	1980-09-19	(United States) Olympic Auditorium, Los Angeles, California, U.S.	
37	Win	33–4	(United States) Melvin Johnson	KO	3 (10)	1980-07-17	(United States) Olympic Auditorium, Los Angeles, California, U.S.	
36	Loss	32–4	(United States) Eddie Logan	TKO	7 (10)	1979-11-16	(United States) The Forum, Inglewood, California, U.S.	
35	Loss	32–3	(Mexico) Juan Alvarez	DQ	5 (10)	1979-07-22	San Luis Potosi, San Luis Potosí, Mexico	
34	Win	32–2	(Puerto Rico) Luis Rosario	SD	10	1979-01-18	(United States) Madison Square Garden, New York, New York, U.S.	
33	Win	31–2	(United States) Alberto Sandoval	TKO	8 (10)	1978-10-26	(United States) Olympic Auditorium, Los Angeles, California, U.S.	
32	Win	30–2	(Mexico) Hector Medina	KO	6 (10)	1978-06-23	Ciudad Obregon, Sonora, Mexico	
31	Loss	29–2	(Panama) Jorge Luján	KO	10 (15)	1977-11-19	(United States) Sports Arena, Los Angeles, California, U.S.	Lost WBA, The Ring, and lineal bantamweight titles
30	Loss	29–1	(Mexico) Carlos Zárate Serna	TKO	4 (10)	1977-04-23	(United States) The Forum, Inglewood, California, U.S.	
29	Win	29–0	(United States) Alejandro Orejel	KO	2 (10)	1977-02-12	Tijuana, Baja California, Mexico	
28	Win	28–0	(South Korea) Hong Soo-hwan	TKO	12 (15)	1976-10-16	Sunin Gymnasium, Incheon, South Korea	Retained WBA, The Ring, and lineal bantamweight titles
27	Win	27–0	(Mexico) Candido Sandoval	KO	3 (10)	1976-09-05	Gomez Palacio, Durango, Mexico	
26	Win	26–0	(Panama) Gilberto Illueca	KO	3 (15)	1976-07-10	Plaza De Toros Monumental, Ciudad Juarez, Chihuahua, Mexico	Retained WBA, The Ring, and lineal bantamweight titles
25	Win	25–0	(Panama) Eusebio Pedroza	KO	2 (15)	1976-04-03	Plaza de Toros Calafia, Mexicali, Baja California, Mexico	Retained WBA, The Ring, and lineal bantamweight titles
24	Win	24–0	(Philippines) Socrates Batoto	KO	2 (15)	1975-12-06	Monumental Plaza de Toros, Mexico City, Distrito Federal, Mexico	Retained WBA, The Ring, and lineal bantamweight titles
23	Win	23–0	(Thailand) Thanomchit Sukhothai	TKO	4 (15)	1975-08-30	(United States) Anaheim Convention Center, Anaheim, California, U.S.	Retained WBA, The Ring, and lineal bantamweight titles
22	Win	22–0	(Mexico) Jorge Torres	TKO	9 (10)	1975-06-02	Tijuana, Baja California, Mexico	
21	Win	21–0	(South Korea) Hong Soo-hwan	KO	4 (15)	1975-03-14	(United States) The Forum, Inglewood, California, U.S.	Won WBA, The Ring, and lineal bantamweight titles
20	Win	20–0	(Philippines) Tanny Amancio	KO	4 (10)	1975-02-04	Ciudad Victoria, Tamaulipas, Mexico	
19	Win	19–0	(Puerto Rico) Jose Antonio Rosa	TKO	3 (10)	1974-11-23	(United States) The Forum, Inglewood, California, U.S.	
18	Win	18–0	(Puerto Rico) Francisco Villegas	KO	2 (10)	1974-10-05	Plaza De Toros Monumental, Ciudad Juarez, Chihuahua, Mexico	
17	Win	17–0	(Philippines) Adrian Zapanta	KO	1 (10)	1974-08-31	Plaza De Toros Monumental, Monterrey, Nuevo León, Mexico	
16	Win	16–0	(Japan) Shintaro Uchiyama	KO	6 (10)	1974-07-09	(United States) The Forum, Inglewood, California, U.S.	
15	Win	15–0	(Mexico) Raul Tirado	TKO	2 (10)	1974-05-25	Palacio de los Deportes, Mexico City, Distrito Federal, Mexico	
14	Win	14–0	(Mexico) Cesar Ordonez	KO	3 (10)	1974-05-07	Tijuana, Baja California, Mexico	
13	Win	13–0	(Mexico) Pedro Ibanez	KO	2 (10)	1974-04-17	Matamoros, Tamaulipas, Mexico	
12	Win	12–0	(Japan) Tetsuro Kawakami	KO	3 (10)	1974-03-31	Mexicali, Baja California, Mexico	
11	Win	11–0	(Mexico) Felix Castro	TKO	3 (10)	1974-02-24	Mexicali, Baja California, Mexico	
10	Win	10–0	(Mexico) Jose Manuel Lara	KO	2 (8)	1974-01-23	Zihuatanejo, Guerrero, Mexico	
9	Win	9–0	(Mexico) Salvador Lozano	KO	9 (10)	1973-12-11	Tijuana, Baja California, Mexico	
8	Win	8–0	(Mexico) Julio Romero	KO	2 (8)	1973-10-30	Tijuana, Baja California, Mexico	
7	Win	7–0	(Mexico) Tortillo Armenta	KO	2 (8)	1973-10-10	Plaza de Toros Monumental, Monterrey, Nuevo León, Mexico	
6	Win	6–0	(Mexico) Cruz Vega	KO	3 (8)	1973-09-15	Plaza de Toros Monumental, Monterrey, Nuevo León, Mexico	
5	Win	5–0	(Mexico) Victor Plascencia	KO	1 (8)	1973-08-21	Tijuana, Baja California, Mexico	
4	Win	4–0	(Mexico) Sixto Esqueda	KO	1 (6)	1973-07-08	La Paz, Baja California Sur, Mexico	
3	Win	3–0	(Mexico) Juan Ramon Perez	KO	2 (6)	1973-06-25	La Paz, Baja California Sur, Mexico	
2	Win	2–0	(Mexico) Antonio Enriquez	TKO	3 (10)	1973-06-02	La Paz, Baja California Sur, Mexico	
1	Win	1–0	(Mexico) Heraclio Amaya	KO	2 (6)	1973-04-16	San Luis Potosi, San Luis Potosí, Mexico	

== See also ==
- List of world bantamweight boxing champions
- List of Mexican boxing world champions

Sporting positions
World boxing titles
Preceded by Hong Soo-hwan	WBA bantamweight champion 14 March 1975 - 19 November 1977	Succeeded by Jorge Luján
Preceded by Hong Soo-hwan	The Ring bantamweight champion 14 March 1975 - 19 November 1977	Succeeded by Jorge Luján
