= James Vrij =

Dutch boxer

James Vrij (born August 9, 1951, in Amsterdam, North Holland) is a retired welterweight boxer from the Netherlands, who represented his native country at the 1972 Summer Olympics. There he was eliminated in the second round of the men's welterweight (– 67 kg) division by eventual silver medalist János Kajdi from Hungary.

== 1972 Olympic results ==
Below is the record of James Vrij, a Dutch welterweight boxer who competed at the 1972 Munich Olympics:

- Round of 64: bye
- Round of 32: lost to János Kajdi (Hungary) by decision, 1-4
