= Francisco Sánchez (boxer) =

Dominican Republic boxer (born 1956)

Personal information
- Nationality: Dominican
- Born: 2 March 1956 (age 70)
- Height: 172 cm (5 ft 8 in)
Medal record
Men's boxing
Representing Dominican Republic
Central American and Caribbean Games
Bronze medal – third place	1974 Santo Domingo	-48 kg

Francisco Sánchez (born 2 March 1956) is a Dominican Republic boxer. He competed in the men's bantamweight event at the 1976 Summer Olympics.
