= Julio Medina (boxer) =

Chilean boxer

Personal information
- Nationality: Chilean
- Born: 13 July 1948 (age 76); Iquique

Sport
- Sport: Boxing

Julio Medina (born 13 July 1948) is a Chilean boxer. He competed in the men's welterweight event at the 1972 Summer Olympics.
