= Ketil Hodne =

Norwegian boxer

Ketil Hodne (born 12 April 1947) was a Norwegian amateur boxer who competed in the 1972 Summer Olympics.

He was born in Lillehammer, and represented the sports club BK Pugilist. He finished 33rd in the welterweight division in the boxing at the 1972 Summer Olympics.

== 1972 Olympic results ==
Below is the record of Ketil Hodne, a Norwegian welterweight boxer who competed at the 1972 Munich Olympics:

- Round of 64: lost to Carlos Berga (Peru) by decision, 1-4
