= Mohamed Rais =

Moroccan boxer

Personal information
- Nationality: Moroccan
- Born: 21 April 1960 (age 66)

Sport
- Sport: Boxing

Mohamed Rais (born 21 April 1960) is a Moroccan boxer. He competed in the men's bantamweight event at the 1976 Summer Olympics. At the 1976 Summer Olympics, he lost to Charles Mooney of the United States.
