= Tsacho Andreykovski =

Bulgarian boxer (born 1954)

Personal information
- Nationality: Bulgarian
- Born: 10 October 1954 (age 71) Lovech, Bulgaria

Sport
- Sport: Boxing
Medal record
Men's boxing
Representing Bulgaria
European Amateur Boxing Championships
Silver medal – second place	1975 Katowice	Bantamweight
Silver medal – second place	1979 Cologne	Featherweight

Tsacho Andreykovski (Bulgarian: Цачо Андрейковски, born 10 October 1954) is a Bulgarian boxer. He competed at the 1976 Summer Olympics and the 1980 Summer Olympics. At the 1976 Summer Olympics, he defeated Aldo Cosentino of France, before losing to Ku Yong-jo of North Korea.
