= Marian Lazăr =

Romanian boxer

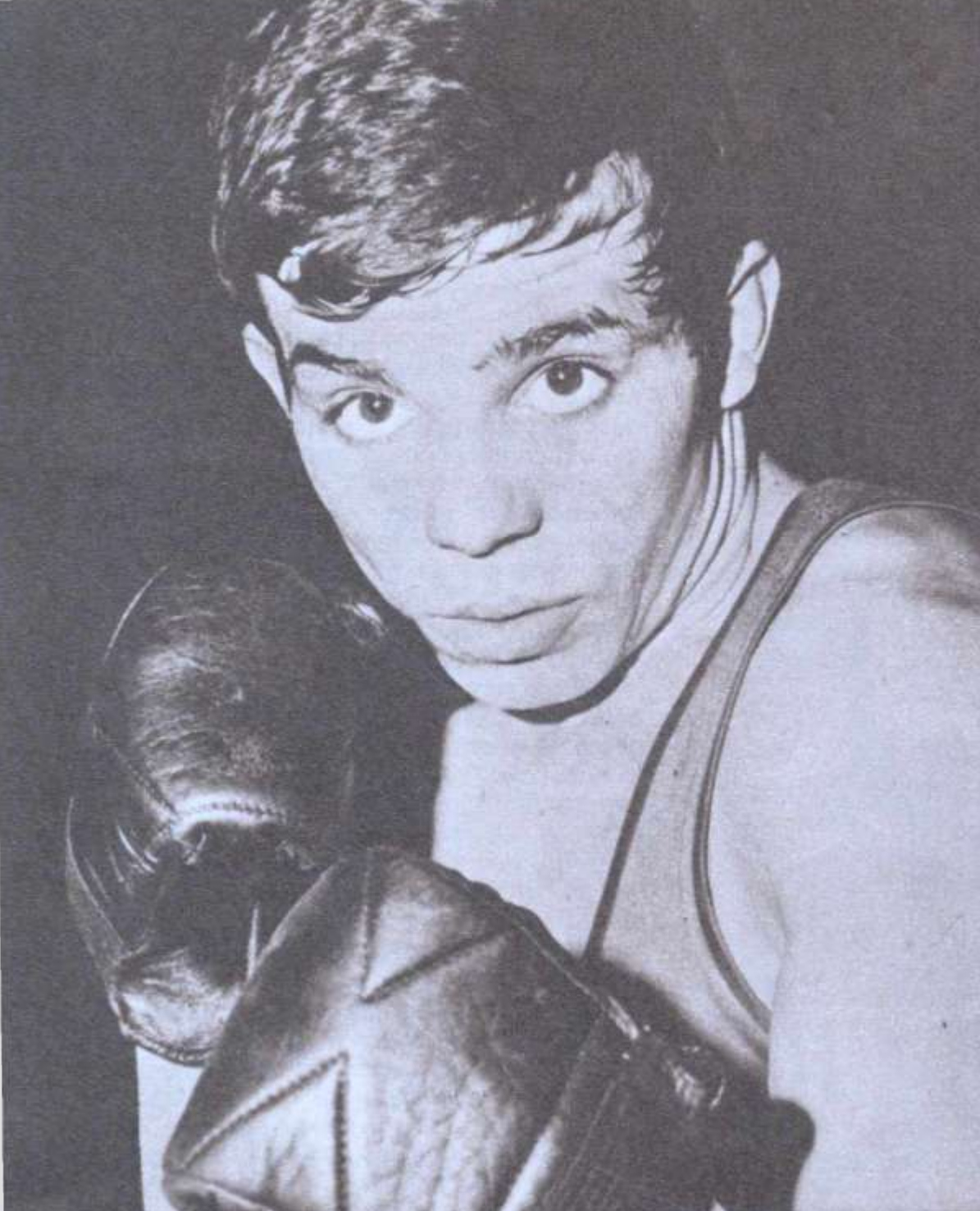

Personal information
- Nationality: Romanian
- Born: 14 October 1952 (age 72); Medgidia, Romania

Sport
- Sport: Boxing

Marian Lazăr (born 14 October 1952) is a Romanian boxer. He competed in the men's bantamweight event at the 1972 Summer Olympics.
