= Alejandro Silva (boxer) =

Puerto Rican boxer (born 1957)

Personal information
- Nationality: Puerto Rican
- Born: 7 November 1957 (age 68)

Sport
- Sport: Boxing
Medal record
Men's amateur boxing
Representing Puerto Rico
Pan American Games
Bronze medal – third place	1975 Mexico City	Bantamweight

Alejandro Silva (born 7 November 1957) is a Puerto Rican boxer. He competed in the men's bantamweight event at the 1976 Summer Olympics. At the 1976 Summer Olympics, he lost to Patrick Cowdell of Great Britain.
