= Ku Yong-jo =

North Korean boxer

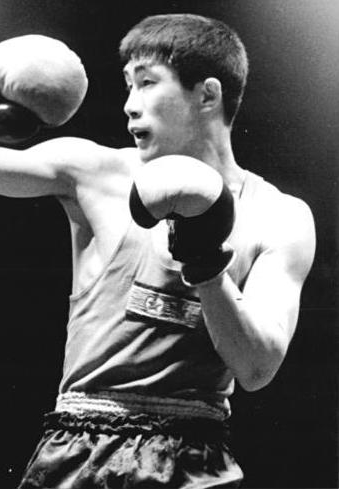
- Ku Yong-jo fighting East Germany's Ulf Graf at the 1980 Olympic Eliminator

Personal information
- Born: July 17, 1955 Hamhung, North Korea
- Died: March 2001 (aged 45)

Boxing career
Medal record
Men's boxing
Representing North Korea
Olympic Games
Gold medal – first place	1976 Montreal	Bantamweight
Asian Games
Gold medal – first place	1974 Tehran	Flyweight
Gold medal – first place	1978 Bangkok	Featherweight
Asian Championships
Bronze medal – third place	1977 Jakarta	Featherweight

- Ku Yong-jo
- Hangul: 구영조
- RR: Gu Yeongjo
- MR: Ku Yŏngjo

Ku Yong-jo (July 17, 1955 – March 2001) was a boxer from North Korea, who won the gold medal in the bantamweight (–54 kg) division at the 1976 Summer Olympics in Montreal, Quebec, Canada. In the final, he defeated American boxer Charles Mooney. In 1980, he competed in the featherweight division and, after receiving a first-round bye, lost his first bout to Krzysztof Kosedowski of Poland.

== Olympic results ==
Montreal 1976

- 1st round bye
- Round of 32: Defeated Faredin Ibrahim (Romania) on points, 4–1
- Round of 16: Defeated Chacho Andreykovski (Bulgaria) on points, 5–0
- Quarterfinal: Defeated Weerachart Saturngrun (Thailand) on points, 5–0
- Semifinal: Defeated Pat Cowdell (Great Britain) on points, 4–1
- Final: Defeated Charles Mooney (United States) on points, 5–0 (won gold medal)

Moscow 1980

- Round of 32: bye
- Round of 16 Lost to Krzysztof Kosedowski (Poland) on points, 0–5
