= Mbwana Mkanga =

Tanzanian boxer (born 1949)

Personal information
- Nationality: Tanzanian
- Born: 18 September 1949 (age 75)

Sport
- Sport: Boxing

Mbraka Mbwana Mkanga (born 18 September 1949) is a Tanzanian boxer. He competed in the men's welterweight event at the 1972 Summer Olympics.
