= Mick Dowling =

Irish boxer

Personal information
- Nationality: Irish
- Born: Michael Dowling; 17 December 1946 (age 78) Castlecomer, County Kilkenny
- Occupation(s): Boxer; sports analyst

Michael Dowling (born 17 December 1946) is an Irish former international boxer and current boxing commentator and analyst. He hails from Castlecomer, County Kilkenny.

== Boxing career ==
Dowling boxed internationally for Ireland fifty times including at the 1968 Mexico and 1972 Munich Olympic Games. He boxed in the bantamweight (54 kg) division. In the 1972 Munich Olympic Games, Dowling was beaten by Cuba's ultimate gold medallist Orlando Martínez to the quarter-finals. Dowling holds two European Bronze Medals (from 1969 and 1971) and still holds the record for eight consecutive National Elite titles in the same weight division. He has nine national titles in total from the Irish Amateur Boxing Association.

== Coaching ==
Mick Dowling is now one of Ireland's best-known boxing coaches having served as a member of the National Coaching Committee for ten years. He is currently senior coach of the Mount Tallant Boxing Club and Institute of Technology, Tallaght's Boxing Squad. He has also trained the Leinster Rugby squad in the art of Boxing Conditioning.

Dowling is now a well-known boxing commentator and fight analyst. He works primarily with RTÉ Sport in their coverage of Irish amateur boxing including the IABA National Championships, European Amateur Boxing Championships, World Amateur Boxing Championships and the Olympic Games.

== Family and business ==
Dowling owns and runs "Mick Dowling Sportsworld", a sports shop in Terenure, Dublin.

His son Mark Dowling is also a professional sportsman - a cyclist. Mick's daughter Lisa runs a fitness centre in Dublin, where her father provides coaching.
