= Hakkı Sözen =

Turkish boxer

Personal information
- Nationality: Turkish
- Born: 1 February 1950 (age 75)

Sport
- Sport: Boxing

Hakkı Sözen (born 1 February 1950) is a Turkish boxer. He competed in the men's welterweight event at the 1972 Summer Olympics. At the 1972 Summer Olympics, he lost to Alfonso Fernández of Spain.
