= Leszek Borkowski =

Polish boxer

Personal information
- Nationality: Polish
- Born: 27 June 1952; Łódź, Poland
- Died: 6 November 2017 (aged 65)

Sport
- Sport: Boxing

Leszek Borkowski (27 June 1952 – 6 November 2017) was a Polish boxer. He competed in the men's bantamweight event at the 1976 Summer Olympics. At the 1976 Summer Olympics, he lost to Patrick Cowdell of Great Britain.
