= Brian Tink =

Australian boxer

Personal information
- Nationality: Australian
- Born: 26 September 1958 (age 66); Dubbo, New South Wales, Australia

Sport
- Sport: Boxing

Brian Tink (born 26 September 1958) is an Australian former boxer. He competed in the men's bantamweight event at the 1976 Summer Olympics. At the 1976 Summer Olympics, he defeated Glubran Zugdani of Liberia, before losing to Bernardo Onori of Italy.

He won the bronze medal in the Men's Lightweight at the 1982 Commonwealth Games.
