= Werner Schäfer =

German boxer

Personal information
- Nationality: German
- Born: 29 December 1952 (age 72); Ratingen, West Germany

Sport
- Sport: Boxing

Werner Schäfer (born 29 December 1952) is a German boxer. He competed in the men's bantamweight event at the 1972 Summer Olympics. At the 1972 Summer Olympics, he lost to Joe Destimo of Ghana.
