= Bernardo Onori =

Italian boxer

Personal information
- Nationality: Italian
- Born: 6 October 1946 (age 80) Rome, Italy

Sport
- Sport: Boxing

Bernardo Onori (born 6 October 1946) is an Italian boxer. He competed in the men's bantamweight event at the 1976 Summer Olympics. At the 1976 Summer Olympics, he beat Abdelnabi El-Sayed and Brian Tink before losing to Charles Mooney.
