= Joe Mensah (boxer) =

Nigerian boxer

Personal information
- Nationality: Nigerian
- Born: 4 August 1945 (age 80)

Sport
- Sport: Boxing

Joseph Mensah (born 4 August 1945) is a Nigerian boxer. He competed in the men's welterweight event at the 1972 Summer Olympics.
