= Charles Mooney (boxer) =

American boxer

Personal information
- Full name: Charles Michael Mooney
- Born: January 27, 1951 (age 75) Washington, D.C., U.S.
Medal record
Men's boxing
Representing the United States
Olympic Games
Silver medal – second place	1976 Montreal	Bantamweight

Charles Michael "Charlie" Mooney (born January 27, 1951) is a retired boxer from the United States, who won the silver medal in the bantamweight (– 54 kg) division at the 1976 Summer Olympics in Montreal, Quebec, Canada. There he lost by decision in the final by North Korea's Gu Yong-Ju.

Mooney is married to Dara Mooney and has two daughters, Lanette and Charkeena, and one son, Charles Jr. seven grand children, four boys and three girls. He was a three-time All Army champion, three-time inter-service champion, won a silver medal in Pan Am trials and took bronze and silver medals at the AAU nationals. In the US Army at the time, he did not turn professional. Mooney made the Army his career, and retired with 22 years active service, ending August 29, 1992, with the rank of Sergeant First Class.

Mooney was born in Washington, D.C. started his new career at Eastern Senior High school as a US Army JROTC instructor from 1992 to 2006 and he also ran the Olympic torch in Washington DC in 1996. In 1977–1978 he was an All Army assistant coach. In 1977–1984 he was an athlete rep for the ABF, Olympic committee and a trainer for the 1984 Olympic boxing team. In 1992–2008, Mooney, founded and the Charles M. Mooney Academy of Boxing, a non-profit 501c3 in Rockville and Laurel, Maryland. Mooney also had the opportunity to go to China to train the Chinese Olympics' Boxing Team in Beijing, China. Mooney trained the World Series Boxing Team in Memphis, Tennessee, known as the Memphis Force and was the trainer of USBA cruiserweight champion Darnell Wilson, as well as Wayne Hampton, Adele Olakanye, Keith Kemp, Brian Cook, Marlyn Haynes, two-time WBC champion Keith Holmes WBC champion Sharmba Mitchell, ranked heavyweight Tony Thompson, Teddy Reid, Fabian Garcia, Theon Holland, Simon Brown, Darell Holawell, William Joppy, Corey Sanders, and world champion Chris Byrd, Matt Korobov soon to be middle weight champion, Alexey Sergeevich Zubov and world Heavyweight title challenger Jameel McCline.

== Olympic results ==
Below are the results of Charles Mooney, an American boxer who competed in the bantamweight division at the 1976 Montreal Olympics:

- Round of 64: Defeated Mohamed Rais (Morocco) by decision, 5-0
- Round of 32: Defeated Juan Francisco Rodríguez (Spain) by decision, 4-1
- Round of 16: Defeated Bernardo Onori (Italy) by decision, 5-0
- Quarterfinal: Defeated Hwang Chul-soon (South Korea) by decision, 3-2
- Semifinal: Defeated Viktor Rybakov (Soviet Union) by decision, 4-1
- Final: Lost to Gu Yong-Ju (North Korea) by decision, 0-5 (was awarded the silver medal)
