= Deusdete Vasconcelos =

Brazilian boxer

Personal information
- Born: 25 January 1947; São Paulo, Brazil
- Died: 8 February 2025 (aged 78)

Sport
- Sport: Boxing

Deusdete Vasconcelos (25 January 1947 — 8 February 2025) was a Brazilian boxer. He competed in the men's bantamweight event at the 1972 Summer Olympics. At the 1972 Summer Olympics, he lost to Kim Jong-ik of North Korea.

He died on 8 February 2025.
