= János Kajdi =

Hungarian boxer (1939–1992)

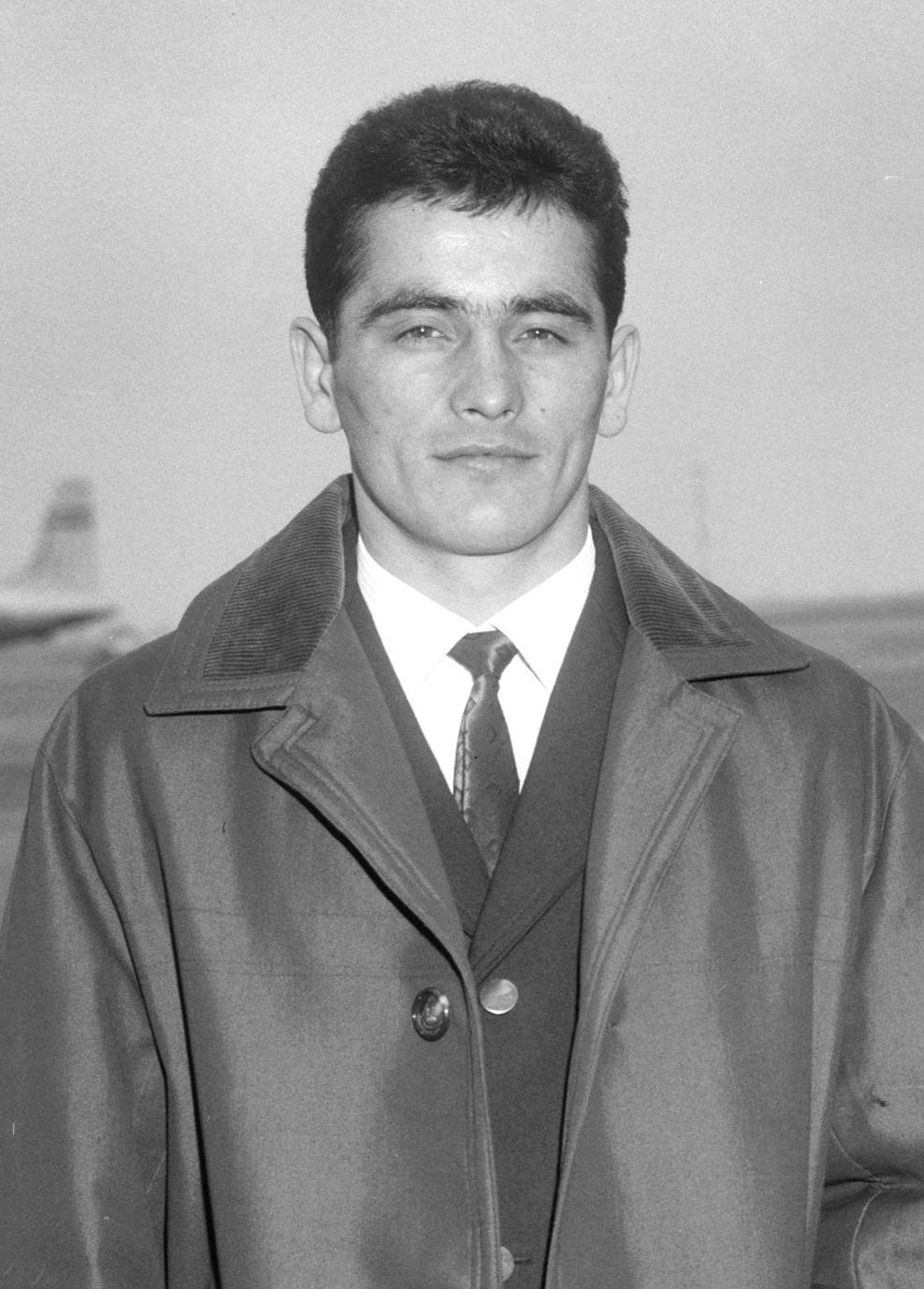
- János Kajdi in 1966

Personal information
- Full name: Kajdi János
- Born: 30 December 1939 Szombathely, Hungary
- Died: 10 April 1992 (aged 52) Budapest, Hungary
- Height: 1.72 m (5 ft 8 in)

Sport
- Sport: Boxing
- Weight class: Welterweight
- Club: Budapesti Honvéd Sportegyesület
Medal record
Representing Hungary
Olympic Games
Silver medal – second place	1972 Munich	Welterweight
European Championships
Bronze medal – third place	1961 Belgrade	-60 kg
Gold medal – first place	1963 Moscow	-60 kg
Bronze medal – third place	1967 Rome	-63.5 kg
Gold medal – first place	1971 Madrid	-67 kg

János Kajdi (30 December 1939 – 10 April 1992) was a boxer from Hungary. He competed at the 1964, 1968 and 1972 Olympics in the lightweight, light-welterweight and welterweight (– 67 kg) division, respectively, and won a silver medal in 1972. In the final he was defeated by Cuba's Emilio Correa on points (5:0).

== 1964 Olympic results ==
Below are the results of János Kajdi, a lightweight boxer form Hungary, who competed at the 1964 Tokyo Olympics:

- Round of 64: bye
- Round of 32: defeated Ram Prasad Gurung (Nepal) referee stopped contest
- Round of 16: defeated Alex Odhiambo (Uganda) by decision, 5–0
- Quarterfinal: lost to Velikton Barannikov (Soviet Union) referee stopped contest

== 1968 Olympic results ==
Below are the results of János Kajdi, a light welterweight boxer form Hungary, who competed at the 1968 Mexico City Olympics:

- Round of 64: bye
- Round of 32: lost to Jerzy Kulej (Poland) by decision, 2–3

== 1972 Olympic results ==
Below are the results of János Kajdi, a welterweight boxer form Hungary, who competed at the 1972 Munich Olympics:

- Round of 32: Defeated James Vrij (Netherlands) by decision, 4–1
- Round of 16: Defeated Damdinjavyn Bandi (Mongolia) by a second-round knockout
- Quarterfinal: Defeated Maurice Hope (Great Britain) by decision, 5–0
- Semifinal: Defeated Richard Murunga (Kenya) by decision, 4–1
- Final: Lost to Emilio Correa (Cuba) by decision, 0–5 (was awarded the silver medal)
