= Walter Henry =

Canadian boxer (born 1937)

Personal information
- Full name: John Walter Henry
- Nickname: Wee Walter
- Nationality: Canadian
- Born: 28 July 1937 (age 88) Hong Kong
- Height: 157 cm (5 ft 2 in)
- Weight: 51 kg (112 lb)

Sport
- Sport: Boxing
- Weight class: Flyweight
Medal record
Men's boxing
Representing Canada
Pan American Games
Bronze medal – third place	1967 Winnipeg	Flyweight -51 kg

John Walter Henry (born 28 July 1937) is a Canadian boxer. He competed at the 1964 Summer Olympics and the 1968 Summer Olympics. In 1964, he was eliminated in his first bout by Constantin Ciucă of Romania. At the 1968 Summer Olympics, he received a first-round bye but then lost his bout to Joseph Destimo of Ghana.
