= Manouchehr Bahmani =

Iranian boxer

Personal information
- Nationality: Iranian
- Born: 9 December 1951 (age 74)

Sport
- Sport: Boxing
Medal record
Asian Championships
Bronze medal – third place	1971 Tehran	54 kg

Manouchehr Bahmani (Persian: منوچهر بهمنی; born 9 December 1951) is an Iranian boxer. He competed in the men's bantamweight event at the 1972 Summer Olympics. At the 1972 Summer Olympics, he lost to Wang Chee-yen of Taiwan.
