= Karl Gschwind =

Swiss boxer

Personal information
- Nationality: Swiss
- Born: 18 October 1943 (age 81)

Sport
- Sport: Boxing

Karl Gschwind (born 18 October 1943) is a Swiss boxer. He competed in the men's welterweight event at the 1972 Summer Olympics.
