= Nicolas Ortíz =

Puerto Rican boxer

Personal information
- Nationality: Puerto Rican
- Born: 9 May 1952 (age 74) Cidra, Puerto Rico

Sport
- Sport: Boxing

Nicolas Ortíz (born 9 May 1952) is a Puerto Rican boxer. He competed in the men's welterweight event at the 1972 Summer Olympics. At the 1972 Summer Olympics, he lost to Ib Bøtcher of Denmark.
