= Garry Davis (boxer) =

Bahamian boxer (born 1947)

Personal information
- Full name: Garvin Davis
- Nationality: Bahamian
- Born: 1 May 1947 (age 77)

Sport
- Sport: Boxing

Garvin Davis (born 1 May 1947) is a Bahamian boxer. He competed in the men's welterweight event at the 1972 Summer Olympics. At the 1972 Summer Olympics, he lost to Maurice Hope of Great Britain.

Davis also represented the Bahamas at the 1974 Central American and Caribbean Games in the welterweight category.
