= Thanasis Khouliaras =

Greek boxer (born 1949)

Personal information
- Nationality: Greek
- Born: 10 May 1949 (age 75); Stylida, Greece

Sport
- Sport: Boxing

Thanasis Khouliaras (born 10 May 1949) is a Greek boxer. He competed in the men's bantamweight event at the 1976 Summer Olympics. In his opening fight, he lost to Chul Soon-hwang of South Korea.
