= Abdel Nabi El-Sayed Mahran =

Egyptian boxer (born 1950)

Personal information
- Nationality: Egyptian
- Born: 29 January 1950 (age 75)

Sport
- Sport: Boxing

Abdel Nabi El-Sayed Mahran (born 29 January 1950) is an Egyptian boxer. He competed in the men's bantamweight event at the 1976 Summer Olympics. At the 1976 Summer Olympics he lost to Bernardo Onori of Italy.
