= Ib Bøtcher =

Danish boxer

Personal information
- Nationality: Danish
- Born: 21 July 1952 (age 72); Frederiksberg, Denmark

Sport
- Sport: Boxing

Ib Bøtcher (born 21 July 1952) is a Danish boxer. He competed at the 1972 Summer Olympics and the 1976 Summer Olympics. At the 1972 Summer Olympics, he defeated Nicolas Ortíz of Puerto Rico, before losing to John Rodgers of Ireland.
