= Les Hamilton =

Canadian boxer

Personal information
- Nationality: Canadian
- Born: 7 August 1954 (age 70); Vancouver, British Columbia, Canada

Sport
- Sport: Boxing

Leslie "Les" Hamilton (born 7 August 1954) is a Canadian boxer. He competed in the men's bantamweight event at the 1972 Summer Olympics. In the first round he lost to Stefan Förster of East Germany, taking 33rd place.

== See also ==
- Boxing at the 1972 Summer Olympics – Bantamweight
