= Kim Jong-ik =

North Korean boxer (born 1949)

Personal information
- Native name: 김종익
- Nationality: North Korean
- Born: 25 May 1949 (age 76)

Sport
- Sport: Boxing

Kim Jong-ik (born 25 May 1949) is a North Korean boxer. He competed in the men's bantamweight event at the 1972 Summer Olympics.
