= Eduardo Barragán =

Colombian boxer (born 1951)

Personal information
- Born: July 1, 1951 (age 74) Cartagena de Chairá
Medal record
Men's Boxing
Representing Colombia
Central American and Caribbean Games
Gold medal – first place	1970 Panama City	Flyweight

Eduardo Barragán (born July 1, 1951 in Cartagena de Chairá, Caquetá) is a retired Colombian boxer, who competed for his South American nation at the 1972 Summer Olympics in Munich, West Germany.

There he was defeated in the first round of the Men's Bantamweight (– 54 kg) division by Kenya's John Nderu. Barragan won the gold medal in the Flyweight (– 51 kg) division at the 1970 Central American and Caribbean Games in Panama City, Panama.
