= David Oleme =

Cameroonian boxer (born 1952)

Personal information
- Nationality: Cameroonian
- Born: 7 January 1952 (age 73)

Sport
- Sport: Boxing

David Oleme (born 7 January 1952) is a Cameroonian boxer. He competed in the men's bantamweight event at the 1972 Summer Olympics.
