= René Silva =

Nicaraguan boxer

Personal information
- Born: 27 November 1954; León, Nicaragua
- Died: 3 June 1978 (aged 23); Granada, Nicaragua

Sport
- Sport: Boxing

René Silva (27 November 1954 – 3 June 1978) was a Nicaraguan boxer. He competed in the men's bantamweight event at the 1972 Summer Olympics. At the 1972 Summer Olympics, he lost to Ferry Moniaga of Indonesia.
