= Ko Saing-keun =

South Korean boxer

Personal information
- Nationality: South Korean
- Born: 6 July 1951 (age 73)

Sport
- Sport: Boxing

Ko Saing-keun (born 6 July 1951) is a South Korean boxer. He competed in the men's bantamweight event at the 1972 Summer Olympics.
