= József Jakab =

Hungarian boxer

Personal information
- Nationality: Hungarian
- Born: 23 December 1954 (age 70); Pápasalamon, Hungary

Sport
- Sport: Boxing

József Jakab (born 23 December 1954) is a Hungarian boxer. He competed in the men's bantamweight event at the 1976 Summer Olympics. At the 1976 Summer Olympics, he lost to Stephan Forster of East Germany.
