= Faredin Ibrahim =

Romanian boxer

Personal information
- Nationality: Romanian
- Born: 30 April 1952 (age 74) Constanța, Romania

Sport
- Sport: Boxing

Faredin Ibrahim (born 30 April 1952) is a Romanian boxer. He competed in the men's bantamweight event at the 1976 Summer Olympics.
