= Emilio Correa (boxer born 1953) =

Cuban boxer (1953–2024)

Personal information
- Full name: Emilio Correa Vaillant
- Nationality: Cuba
- Born: 21 March 1953 Santiago de Cuba, Cuba
- Died: 11 March 2024 (aged 70) Boa Vista, Roraima, Brazil
- Height: 1.83 m (6 ft 0 in)
- Weight: 67 kg (148 lb)

Sport
- Sport: Boxing
- Weight class: Welterweight
Medal record
Olympic Games
Gold medal – first place	1972 Munich	Welterweight
World Championships
Gold medal – first place	1974 Havana	Welterweight
Pan American Games
Gold medal – first place	1971 Cali	Welterweight
Bronze medal – third place	1975 Mexico City	Welterweight
Central American and Caribbean Games
Gold medal – first place	1974 Santo Domingo	Welterweight

Emilio Correa Vaillant (Note: In this Spanish name, the first or paternal surname is Correa and the second or maternal family name is Vaillant.) (21 March 1953 – 11 March 2024) was a Cuban amateur boxer who won welterweight gold at the 1972 Summer Olympics held in Munich, West Germany. He is not to be confused with his middleweight namesake, who is actually his son.

Inspired by his compatriots Roberto Caminero "Chocolatico" Pérez, Enrique Regüeiferos, Félix Betancourt, and Rolando Garbey who also hail from Santiago de Cuba, he started boxing in 1966.

At the PanAm Games in Cali, Colombia (1971) he won gold against American Larry Carlisle, but it was not until he beat Betancourt at the national championships in 1972 that he was able to secure his ticket to the Olympics. There he knocked out the defending champion Manfred Wolke of East Germany in the round of sixteen and defeated the rest on points to win Cuba's first welterweight boxing gold.

Correa died on 11 March 2024, at the age of 70.

== 1972 Olympic results ==
Below is the record of Emilio Correa, a Cuban welterweight boxer who competed at the 1972 Munich Olympics:

- Round of 64: bye
- Round of 32: Defeated Damiano Lassandro (Italy) by decision, 5–0
- Round of 16: Defeated Manfred Wolke (East Germany) by technical knockout in the second round
- Quarterfinal: Defeated Günther Meier (West Germany) by decision, 3–2
- Semifinal: Defeated Jesse Valdez (United States) by decision, 3–2
- Final: Defeated János Kajdi (Hungary) by decision, 5-0 (won gold medal)

In 1974 Correa became the inaugural world champion at welterweight by knocking out American Clinton Jackson.

From 1973 to 1976 he defended his national title and in 1977 won the national junior middleweight title.

Internationally Correa didn't have much success after 1974. At the PanAm Games in Ciudad de México (1975) he lost a decision to Jackson.

At the Olympics 1976 he lost inside the distance to Venezuelan Pedro Gamarro.

- 1st round bye
- Defeated Plamen Yankov (Bulgaria) RSC 2
- Lost to Pedro Gamarro (Venezuela) RSC 3

Correa fought his last fight winning the national middleweight title in 1979.
