= George Turpin =

English boxer

Personal information
- Nationality: English
- Born: 10 January 1952 (age 74) Liverpool, England
- Height: 5 ft 4.5 in (164 cm)
- Weight: Bantamweight

Boxing career

Boxing record
- Total fights: 16
- Wins: 11
- Win by KO: 5
- Losses: 3
- Draws: 2
- No contests: 0

Olympic medal record

Men's Boxing
Bronze medal – third place	1972 Munich	Bantamweight

George Turpin (born 10 January 1952 in Liverpool) is an Olympic medallist and former bantamweight boxer from the United Kingdom. He won a bronze medal at the 1972 Summer Olympics.

== Early life ==
Turpin was born in Liverpool on 10 January 1952.

== Boxing career ==
=== Amateur career ===
Turpin boxed out of Golden Gloves ABC, situated in the heart of Toxteth, Liverpool.

Turpin was unbeaten as a senior amateur against British opposition.

After winning the British ABA championship for 2 consecutive years in 1971 and 1972, he won a bronze medal at the 1972 Summer Olympics. In the semifinals of the men's bantamweight (– 54 kg) division he was defeated by Cuba's eventual gold medalist Orlando Martínez on a hotly disputed 3–2 split decision.

Turpin gave England its first victory with a decision over Ray Theragood of Santa Fe, N.M. in a 119 pound-class bout in the Felt Forum, on 15 January 1973 before a crowd of around 1,000 people. He was part of the England's national amateur boxing team, who were up against the United States team.

=== Professional career ===
Turpin had a successful professional career, from 1973 to 1977, recording eleven wins, with five being by knockout, three losses and two draws.

Turpin is listed as one of the ten best Liverpool Boxers of all time.

== 1972 Olympic results ==
Below is the record of George Turpin, a bantamweight boxer from Great Britain who competed at the 1972 Munich Olympics:

- Round of 64: bye
- Round of 32: defeated Pierre Amont N'diaye (Senegal) by decision, 5–0
- Round of 16: defeated Chee Yen Wang (Chinese Taipei) by decision, 5–0
- Quarterfinal: defeated John Mwaura Nderu (Kenya) by decision, 4–1
- Semifinal: lost to Orlando Martinez (Cuba) by decision, 2–3 (was awarded a bronze medal)

== The Mersey Fighters Book ==
Turpin is featured in volume three of the popular 'Mersey Fighters' book series, titled 'More lives and times of Liverpool's boxing heroes'. The book contains in-depth biographical information on Turpin, described as one of the region's 'biggest names' in an interview with the author.
