= Charndej Weerapol =

Thai boxer

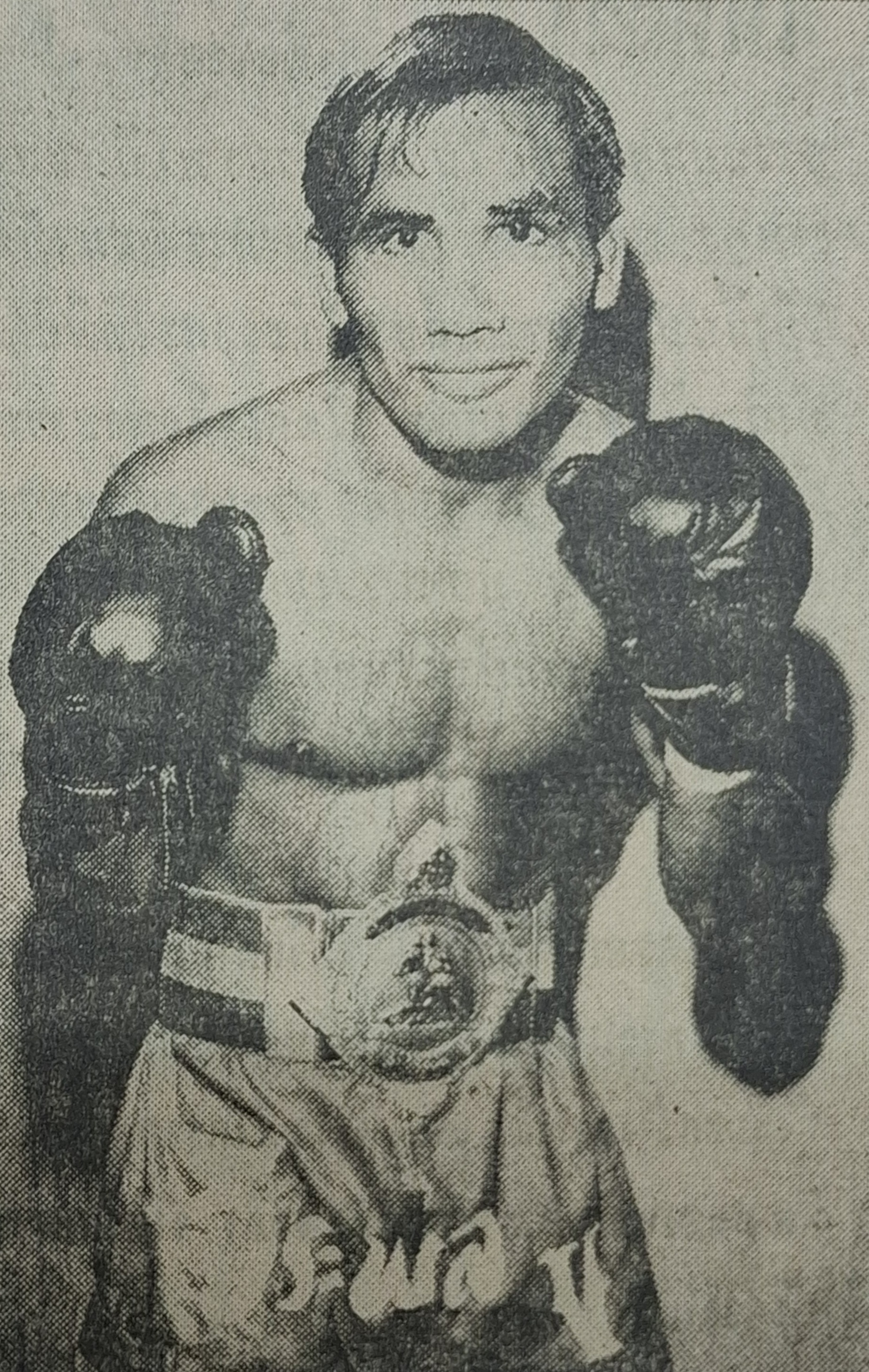

Personal information
- Nationality: Thai
- Born: 21 January 1944 (age 81)

Sport
- Sport: Boxing

Charndej Weerapol (born 21 January 1944) is a Thai boxer. He competed in the men's bantamweight event at the 1972 Summer Olympics.
