= Umut Sözen =

Turkish footballer

Personal information
- Date of birth: 27 January 1990 (age 36)
- Place of birth: İzmir, Turkey
- Height: 1.79 m (5 ft 10 1/2 in)
- Position: Attacking midfielder

Youth career
- 2000–2007: Altay

Senior career*
Years	Team	Apps	(Gls)
2007–2010	Ankaraspor	6	(1)
2010	→ Ankaragücü (loan)	3	(0)
2010–2012	Ankaragücü	18	(0)
2012–2013	Kayserispor	5	(0)
2013–2014	Karabükspor	2	(0)
2013–2014	→ Manisaspor (loan)	19	(0)
2014	→ Adana Demirspor (loan)	0	(0)
2014–2016	Adana Demirspor	16	(0)
2016–2017	Altınordu	15	(4)
2017	Gençlerbirliği	2	(0)
2017–2018	Fethiyespor	22	(5)
2018–2019	Sakaryaspor	26	(1)
2020–2021	Adanaspor	23	(0)
2021–2022	Karacabey Belediyespor	25	(3)
2022–2023	Vanspor	20	(1)

International career
2005–2006	Turkey U16	11	(3)
2006–2007	Turkey U17	20	(5)
2007–2008	Turkey U18	23	(0)
2008–2009	Turkey U19	16	(4)
2009–2010	Turkey U21	4	(0)
- * Club domestic league appearances and goals as of 20 May 2023

Umut Sözen (born 27 January 1990) is a Turkish footballer who plays as an attacking midfielder.
