= Flevitus Bitegeko =

Tanzanian boxer (born 1952)

Personal information
- Nationality: Tanzanian
- Born: 1 October 1952 (age 72)

Sport
- Sport: Boxing

Flevitus Bitegeko (born 1 October 1952) is a Tanzanian boxer. He competed in the men's bantamweight event at the 1972 Summer Olympics.

== See also ==
- Boxing at the 1972 Summer Olympics – Bantamweight
