= Carlos Burga =

Peruvian boxer (1952–2021)

Personal information
- Full name: Carlos Alberto Burga Quispe
- Nationality: Peruvian
- Born: 12 May 1952
- Died: 17 January 2021 (aged 68)

Sport
- Sport: Boxing

Carlos Burga (12 May 1952 – 17 January 2021) was a Peruvian boxer. He competed in the men's welterweight event at the 1972 Summer Olympics. Burga also competed in the welterweight class at the 1975 Pan American Games.

Burga died in January 2021, from COVID-19 during the pandemic in Peru.
