= Vartex Parsanian =

Iranian Armenian boxer

Personal information
- Born: August 7, 1952 (age 73), Iran
Medal record
Representing Iran
Men's boxing
Asian Games
Bronze medal – third place	1974 Tehran	75 kg

Vartex Parsanian (Persian: وارتکس پارسانیان, born August 7, 1952) is an Iranian Armenian boxer who was a member of Iran senior national Boxing team participating at the 1974 Asian Games in Tehran, in the 75 kg division. In Tehran 1974, Parsanian lost on points to Kim from Korea, in the semifinal, and won the bronze medal of the 75 kg boxing division.
