= John Nderu =

Kenyan boxer (1946–2017)

Personal information
- Nationality: Kenyan
- Born: 18 May 1946
- Died: 17 August 2017 (aged 71) Nakuru, Kenya

Sport
- Sport: Boxing

John Mwaura Nderu (18 May 1946 – 17 August 2017) was a Kenyan boxer. He competed in the men's bantamweight event at the 1972 Summer Olympics.
