= Judit Jakab =

Hungarian-born Swiss basketball player

Personal information
- Born: 23 April 1989 (age 37) Budapest, Hungary
- Listed height: 1.78 m (5 ft 10 in)

Career information
- Playing career: 2004–present
- Position: Forward

Career history
- 2004-2008: Pall. Muraltese
- 2008-2012: Riva Basket
- 2012-2013: Pall. Muraltese
- 2013-present: Fizzy Riva-Muraltese

Judit Jakab (born 23 April 1989) is a Swiss female basketball player of Hungarian descent.
