= Tumat Sogolik =

Papua New Guinean boxer (born 1955)

Personal information
- Nationality: Papua New Guinea
- Born: Tumat Sogolik Papua New Guinea
- Height: 1.60 m (5 ft 3 in)

Boxing career
- Weight class: Bantamweight
Medal record
Men's Boxing
Representing Papua New Guinea
Commonwealth Games
Silver medal – second place	1978 Edmonton	Bantamweight

Tumat Sogolik (born 5 May 1955) is a Papua New Guinean boxer. He represented his country in the bantamweight division at the 1976 Summer Olympics. He won his first match over Samuel Meck. He lost his second match against Chul Soon-Hwang.

He later competed in boxing in the 1978 Commonwealth Games in Edmonton, Canada. He won silver in the Bantamweight division after losing to Barry McGuigan of Northern Ireland. Tumat presently lives on Tsoi Island in the New Ireland Province of Papua New Guinea.
