= Anatoly Khokhlov =

Soviet boxer

Personal information
- Full name: Anatoly Petrovich Khokhlov
- Nationality: Soviet
- Born: 29 October 1947
- Died: March 2008 (aged 60); Solnechny, Russia

Sport
- Sport: Boxing

Anatoly Petrovich Khokhlov (29 October 1947 – March 2008) was a Soviet boxer. He competed in the men's welterweight event at the 1972 Summer Olympics.
