= Panagiotis Therianos =

Greek boxer (born 1947)

Personal information
- Nationality: Greek
- Born: 4 January 1947 (age 78)

Sport
- Sport: Boxing

Panagiotis Therianos (born 4 January 1947) is a Greek boxer. He competed in the men's welterweight event at the 1972 Summer Olympics.
