= John Rodgers (boxer) =

Irish boxer (born 1947)

Personal information
- Nationality: Irish
- Born: 19 March 1947 (age 78)

Sport
- Sport: Boxing

John J. Rodgers (born 19 March 1947) is an Irish boxer. He competed in the men's welterweight event at the 1972 Summer Olympics, placing 9th.
