= Ayele Mohamed =

Ethiopian boxer (born 1950)

Personal information
- Nationality: Ethiopian
- Born: 15 May 1950 (age 75)

Sport
- Sport: Boxing

Ayele Mohamed (born 15 May 1950) is an Ethiopian boxer. He competed at the 1972 Summer Olympics, 1976 Summer Olympics, and the 1980 Summer Olympics. At the 1972 Summer Olympics, he lost to Go Saeng-geun of South Korea.
