= Buyangiin Ganbat =

Mongolian boxer (born 1945)

Personal information
- Nationality: Mongolian
- Born: 8 November 1945 (age 79)

Sport
- Sport: Boxing

Buyangiin Ganbat (Mongolian: Буянгийн Ганбат; born 8 November 1945) is a Mongolian boxer. He competed in the men's bantamweight event at the 1972 Summer Olympics.
