= Hitoshi Ishigaki =

Japanese boxer (born 1953)

Personal information
- Born: September 25, 1953 (age 73) Yamagata, Yamagata, Japan
Medal record
Men's Boxing
Representing Japan
Asian Games
Gold medal – first place	1974 Tehran	Bantamweight

Hitoshi Ishigaki (石垣 仁, Ishigaki Hitoshi) (born September 25, 1953 in Yamagata) is a retired amateur boxer from Japan, who won the gold medal at the 1974 Asian Games in the men's bantamweight (– 54 kg) division. He represented his native country at the 1976 Summer Olympics in Montreal, Quebec, Canada, falling to eventual bronze medal winner Viktor Rybakov in the third round.

== 1976 Olympic results ==
Below ore the results of Hitoshi Ishigaki, a Japanese bantamweight boxer who competed at the 1976 Montreal Olympics:

- Round of 64: bye
- Round of 32: defeated Jozsef Jakab (Hungary) on a second-round disqualification
- Round of 16: lost to Viktor Rybakov (Soviet Union) on points, 0-5
