= Sergio Lozano (boxer) =

Mexican boxer (born 1952)

Personal information
- Full name: Sergio Lozano Aguilar
- Nationality: Mexican
- Born: 9 January 1952 (age 74)

Sport
- Sport: Boxing
Medal record
Men's boxing
Representing Mexico
Pan American Games
Bronze medal – third place	1971 Cali	Welterweight

Sergio Lozano Aguilar (born 9 January 1952) is a Mexican former professional boxer who competed from 1974 to 1980. As an amateur, he competed in the men's welterweight event at the 1972 Summer Olympics.

== Professional career ==
He turned professional in 1974 and competed until about 1980, His professional boxing record lists a number of bouts from 1974 to 1980, including both wins and losses.
