= Mehmet Kumova =

Turkish boxer (born 1952)

Personal information
- Nationality: Turkish
- Born: 1 December 1952 (age 72); Konya, Turkey

Sport
- Sport: Boxing

Mehmet Kumova (born 1 December 1952) is a Turkish boxer. He competed in the men's bantamweight event at the 1972 Summer Olympics. At the 1972 Summer Olympics, he lost to Mayaki Seydou of Niger.
