= Ricardo Fortaleza =

Filipino boxer

- Mendoza (right) against Japan's Masatoshi Igaue, Fortaleza won by technical knock-out in the second round

Medal record

Men's boxing

Representing the Philippines

Asian Games
| Gold medal – first place | 1970 Bangkok | Bantamweight |

Ricardo Mendoza Fortaleza (born April 18, 1951 in Malate, Manila, Philippines) is a Filipino-Australian retired Olympic amateur boxer/amateur boxing coach and boxing instructor. He currently lives in Blacktown, Sydney, Australia.

== Early career ==
Ricardo fought in the bantamweight division. He has won a gold medal in Tokyo, Japan in 1969 at the first Asian youth championships. He has won the only gold medal in Amateur Boxing for the Philippines in the 6th Asian Games in Bangkok and a silver medal finish in the 1971 Asian Boxing Championship in Tehran. Ricardo was Philippine National Games champion in 1969-1974 and Manila Golden Gloves champion in 1965-1967.

== The Fortaleza brothers ==
Ricardo was one of the four famous Fortaleza brothers in the Philippines, they were all famous in the sport of boxing. The four consisted of Ricardo "Ric", Reynaldo "Rey", Renato "Rene" and Rogelio "Roger". Although Ric was the most successful of the four, Rey, Rene and Roger were also successful boxers.

== 1972 Munich Olympics ==
Ricardo represented the Philippines at the 1972 Munich Olympics, losing to Mexico's Alfonso Zamora by a second-round knockout in the Round of 32.

== Coaching ==
Fortaleza became the Philippines boxing team coach from 1976 to 1993. He led the Philippine team at the 1992 Olympic Games in Barcelona, the President's Cup in Jakarta, the King's Cup in Bangkok, the Southeast Asian Games in Singapore, the second World Boxing championships in Belgrade, the Asian Games in Bangkok, the Inter-Cup tournament in Schriesheim (Germany), the Acropolis Cup in Athens, and several other international tournaments.

Fortaleza also trained boxers from different parts of the world. He helped introduce the sport of amateur boxing in Oman, he was assigned at the Sultan Qaboos Sports Complex. He coached the Oman boxing team between 1986 and 1990 and led the team to the 1988 Olympic Games in Seoul, Korea.

Fortaleza acted as a boxing coach at Taipei College of Physical Education in Taiwan.

== Australia ==
Fortaleza migrated with his family to Australia in 2000. He volunteered at the Sydney Olympic games in boxing tournaments.

== Championships and accomplishments ==
- Gold medal - 1st Asian Youth Amateur Boxing Tournament- Tokyo Japan
- Gold medal - 6th Asian Games - Bangkok Thailand
- Silver medal - 1971 Asian Boxing Champhionship - Tehran Iran
- Olympian - 1972 Munich Olympics
- Philippines' Amateur Boxer of the year - 1970, 1971 and 1972

== Personal life ==
Ricardo Fortaleza is the father of Musician Eric Fortaleza.
