= Rey Fortaleza =

Filipino boxer (born 1957)

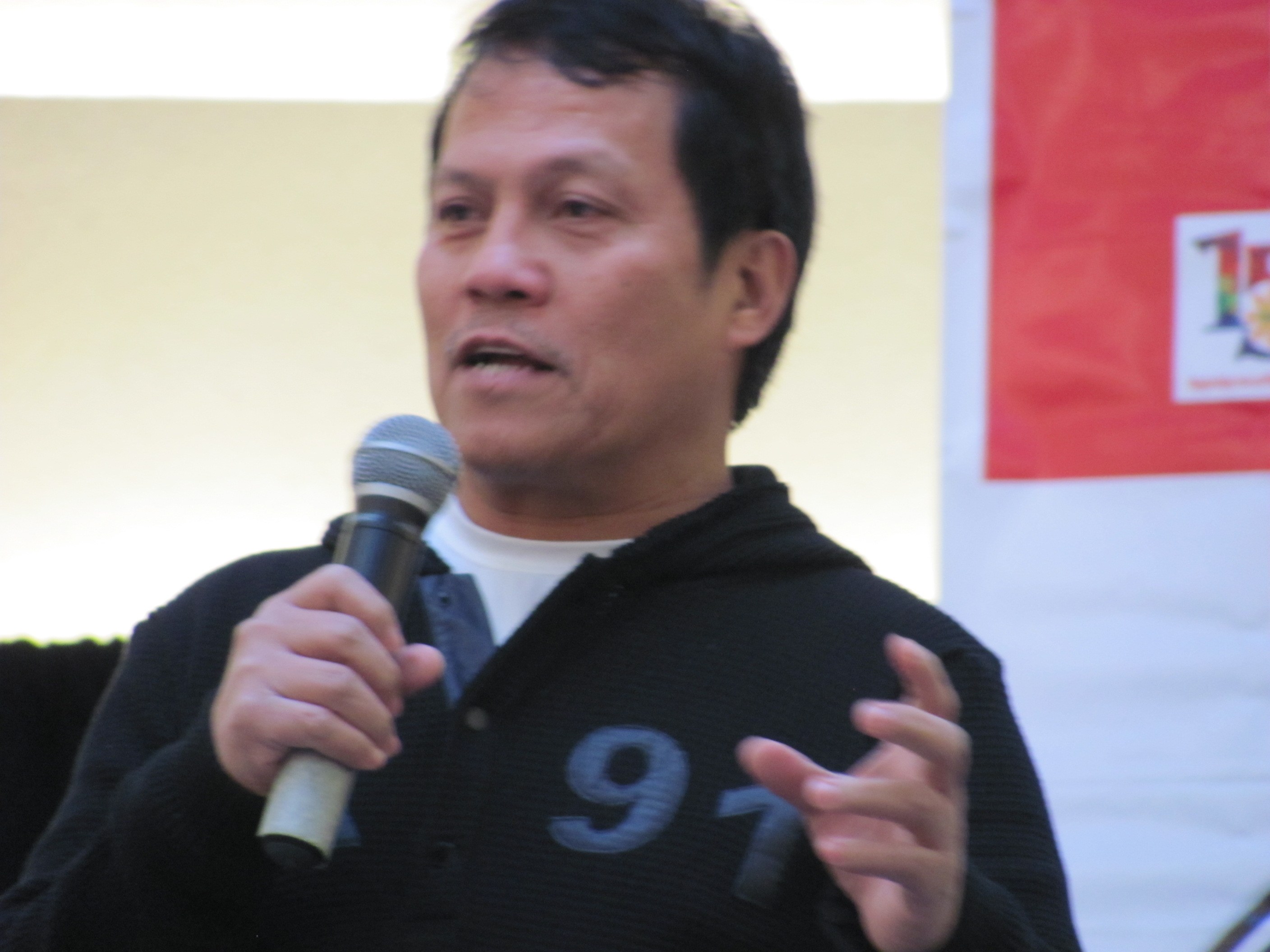
- Rey Fortaleza gestures as he addresses an audience at the first monthly singing contest of PNT Idol in 2011
- Born: Reynaldo Fortaleza; December 26, 1957 (age 68); Philippines
- Occupations: boxer, publisher, insurance agent

Reynaldo "Rey" Fortaleza (born December 26, 1957) is a former Olympic boxer who represented the Philippines in the 1976 Montreal Olympics. In 1990, he immigrated to Canada where he became a community leader and media entrepreneur.

== Early life ==
Born on December 26, 1957, in the Philippines, Reynaldo was part of a boxing family and became one of three brothers to represent his birth country in Olympic boxing. In all, there were ten children - eight brothers and two sisters. His brothers included fellow Olympians Rene and Ric and boxer Roger. "They were the phenomenal 'boxing brothers' of the country, using boxing as their ticket to a good education and consequently, a better life." He "at age 16 captured the flyweight title in the National Youth Amateur Boxing bouts in Bacolod City," in the Philippines. He then went on to win "six golds, one silver and two bronzes in 11 international boxing competitions."

== Olympics ==
As an 18-year-old bantamweight on the 1976 Filipino Olympic team, he reached the quarterfinals of the Montreal Olympics. He was 119 pounds (54 kg), and 5 ft 5 in (165 cm).

== Family ==
Reynaldo married Araceli "Cely" Angeles, who also serves as the business manager of the family's enterprises. They have three children. They reside in Surrey, British Columbia, Canada.

== Canada ==
Fortaleza moved to Canada in 1990 where he first worked at a silk-screening job for minimum wage and then trained and worked as a hospital janitor and maintenance person. He owned and ran a boxing gym briefly before entering newspaper publishing. He is publisher of the Philippine Asian News Today and Living Today magazine through the Reyfort Media Group. He also holds a franchise in the Philippines-based ABS-CBN TV Patrol World, a news program which is available through a local Vancouver cable channel. Through his newspaper or media group he has fostered and supported five years of the Metro Vancouver-area singing contest, the PNT Singing Idol competition.

== Recognition ==
On February 18, 2010, Fortaleza was honoured by Vancouver mayor Gregor Robertson for his 1976 Olympic and current Canadian contributions. He was previously honoured by the Multicultural Sports Development Society for his role in "outstanding sports achievements and contributions to Philippine Sports." He has been recognized for his role in bringing Filipino entertainment and sports figures to entertain Vancouver Filipino audiences and was named by an international Filipino association, Binibining Pilipinas of the World, as one of the "ten most outstanding Filipino Canadians."
