= Alfonso Fernández (boxer) =

Spanish boxer (born 1951)

Personal information
- Full name: Alfonso Fernández Fernández
- Nationality: Spanish
- Born: 15 April 1951 (age 73)

Sport
- Sport: Boxing

Alfonso Fernández Fernández (born 15 April 1951) is a Spanish boxer. He competed in the men's welterweight event at the 1972 Summer Olympics.
