= David Jackson (Ugandan boxer) =

Ugandan boxer

Personal information
- Nationality: Ugandan
- Born: 2 October 1949 (age 75); Kampala, Uganda

Sport
- Sport: Boxing

David Jackson (born 2 October 1949) is a Ugandan boxer. He competed at the 1968 Summer Olympics and the 1972 Summer Olympics.
