= Richard Murunga =

Kenyan boxer (1949–2018)

Hero Murunga
Personal information
- Full name: Hero Murunga
- Nicknames: "Dick" and "Tiger"
- Nationality: Kenya
- Born: 22 April 1949 Amagoro, Teso District
- Died: 26 October 2018 (aged 65) Nairobi, Kenya
- Height: 1.78 m (5 ft 10 in)
- Weight: 67 kg (148 lb)

Sport
- Sport: Boxing
- Weight class: Welterweight
Medal record
Men's Boxing
Bronze medal – third place	1972 Munich	Welterweight

Richard (Hero) Murunga (22 April 1949 – 26 October 2018) was a boxer from Kenya.

== Amateur career ==
He started boxing in 1968, at the age of 19, encouraged by his father, Ernest Illuk, who was a Kenyan army officer. Two years later he joined the Kenyan Army.

Murunga was a bronze medalist at the 1972 Munich Olympic Games, losing to silver medalist Janos Kajdi.

He deserted the army in 1973 as Kenya boxing authorities did not allow him to join professional ranks. Subsequently, he went to Uganda and competed at the East and Central Africa Amateur Boxing Association (Fescaaba) championship representing Uganda under pseudonym Feisal Musante. He was later arrested, when he returned to Kenya.

== 1972 Olympic record ==
Below are the results of Richard Murunga, a Kenyan welterweight boxer who competed at the 1972 Munich Olympics:

- Round of 64: bye
- Round of 32: defeated Alfons Stawski (Poland) by decision, 4–1
- Round of 16: defeated Vartex Parsanian (Iran) by a third-round TKO
- Quarterfinal: defeated Sergio Lozano (Mexico) by a first-round knockout
- Semifinal: lost to Janos Kajdi (Hungary) by decision, 1-4 (was awarded bronze medal)

== Pro career ==
Known as "Tiger", Murunga turned pro after his amateur career in 1973. He was promoted by Mogens Palle. Murunga was the first Kenyan professional boxer.

He fought three fights in Europe, winning all three bouts and retiring late in 1974.

== Personal life ==
Murunga had two wives, Mariam Wambui and Nawal Ahmed, and seven children. He converted to Islam when he married his second wife Nawal, and took a Muslim name, Khalifa. Formerly based in Denmark and Kuwait, as of 2003 he lived in Bombolulu in Mombasa. He died on 26 October 2018, aged 65.
