= Stefan Förster =

East German boxer

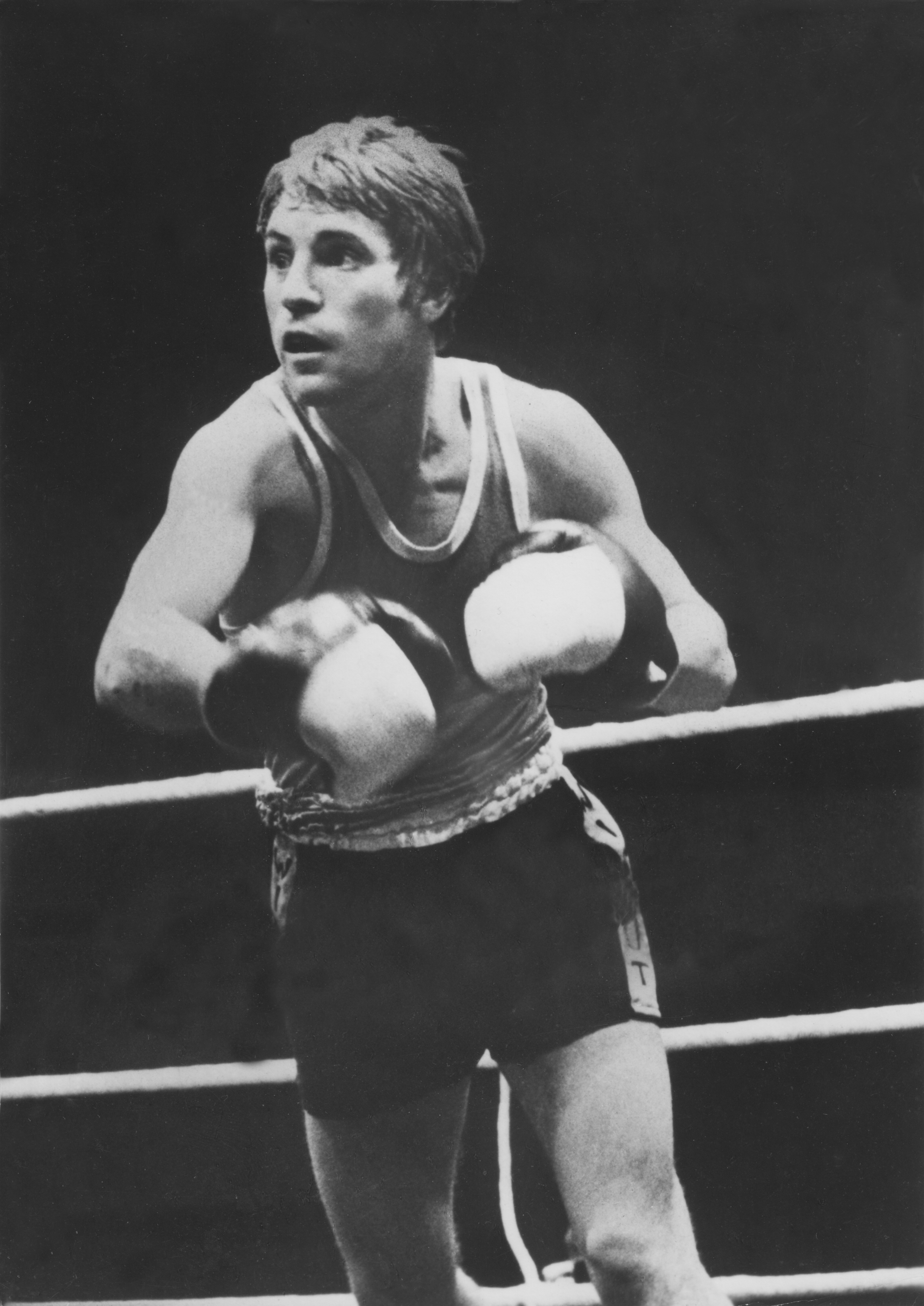

Personal information
- Nationality: German
- Born: 17 October 1950 (age 75) Chemnitz, East Germany

Sport
- Sport: Boxing
Medal record
Men's amateur boxing
Representing East Germany
World Championships
Bronze medal – third place	1978 Belgrade	Bantamweight
European Amateur Championships
Gold medal – first place	1977 Halle	Bantamweight

Stefan Förster (born 17 October 1950) is a German boxer. He competed at the 1972 Summer Olympics and the 1976 Summer Olympics for East Germany. At the 1972 Summer Olympics, he defeated Les Hamilton and Mayaki Seydou, before losing to Alfonso Zamora.
