= Günther Meier =

German boxer (1941–2020)

Medal record

Men's Boxing

Representing West Germany

Olympic Games
Bronze medal – third place	1968 Mexico City	Light Middleweight

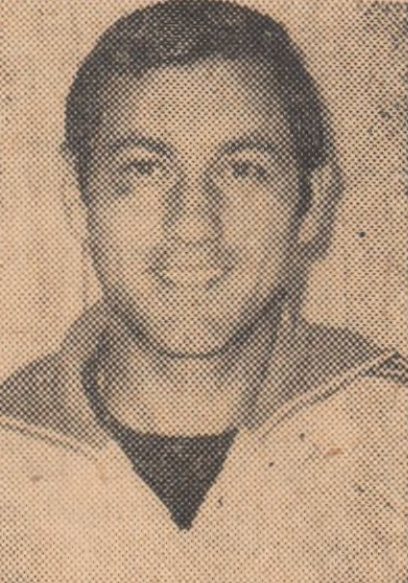
Günther Meier

Günther Meier (Nuremberg, July 26, 1941-Nuremberg, November 23, 2020) was a German amateur boxer who competed in the Light Middleweight (71 kg) category. He won an Olympic bronze medal in 1968. Meier also competed as a welterweight at the 1972 Munich Olympics where he was eliminated in the quarterfinals. He was born in Nuremberg.

== 1972 Olympic results ==
- Round of 64: bye
- Round of 32: defeated Jeff Rackley (New Zealand) by decision, 5-0
- Round of 16: defeated Sangnual Rabieb (Thailand) by decision, 5-0
- Quarterfinal: lost to Emilio Correa (Cuba) by decision 2-3
