= Mick O'Brien (boxer) =

Australian boxer

Personal information
- Nationality: Australian
- Born: 25 March 1954 (age 71)

Sport
- Sport: Boxing

Mick O'Brien (born 25 March 1954) is an Australian boxer. He competed in the men's bantamweight event at the 1972 Summer Olympics.
