= Orlando Martínez =

Cuban boxer (1944–2021)

Personal information
- Full name: Orlando Martínez Romero
- Nationality: Cuba
- Born: 2 September 1944 Havana, Cuba
- Died: 22 September 2021 (aged 77) Havana, Cuba
- Height: 1.67 m (5 ft 6 in)
- Weight: 54 kg (119 lb)

Sport
- Sport: Boxing
- Weight class: Bantamweight
Medal record
Men's boxing
Representing Cuba
Olympic Games
Gold medal – first place	1972 Munich	Bantamweight
Pan American Games
Gold medal – first place	1975 Mexico City	Bantamweight
Central American and Caribbean Games
Bronze medal – third place	1974 Santo Domingo	-54 kg

Orlando Martínez Romero (Note: In this Spanish name, the first or paternal surname is Martínez and the second or maternal family name is Romero.) (2 September 1944 – 22 September 2021) was a Cuban bantamweight boxer, who won the gold medal at the 1972 Summer Olympics. Three years later he captured the gold at the 1975 Pan American Games. Orlando was awarded a hotly disputed 3–2 split decision over Great Britain's George Turpin in the 1972 Munich Olympics semifinal before coasting to a comfortable points win over future professional world bantamweight champion Alfonso Zamora in the final to win the division's gold medal.

== 1968 Olympic results ==
Below are the results of Orlando Martinez of Cuba, a boxer who competed in the flyweight division of the 1968 Mexico City Olympics:

- Round of 32: lost to Tibor Badari (Hungary) by decision, 1–4

== 1972 Olympic results ==
Below are the results of Orlando Martinez of Cuba, a boxer who competed in the bantamweight division of the 1972 Munich Olympics:

- Round of 64: bye
- Round of 32: Defeated Win Maung (Burma) by decision, 4–1
- Round of 16: Defeated Michael Dowling (Ireland) by decision, 3–2
- Quarterfinal: Defeated Ferry Moniaga (Indonesia) by decision, 5–0
- Semifinal: Defeated George Turpin (Great Britain) by decision, 3–2
- Final: Defeated Alfonso Zamora (Mexico) by decision, 5–0 (won gold medal)
