= Damdinjavyn Bandi =

Mongolian boxer (1942–2018)

Personal information
- Born: 25 February 1942 Teshig, Mongolia
- Died: 10 January 2018 (aged 75)
- Height: 179 cm (5 ft 10 in)
- Weight: 68 kg (150 lb)

Boxing career
- Weight class: Welterweight
Medal record
Men's boxing
Representing Mongolia
Asian Amateur Boxing Championships
Silver medal – second place	1971 Tehran	Welterweight
Silver medal – second place	1975 Yokohama	Light middleweight

Damdinjavyn Bandi (Дамдинжавын Банди, 25 February 1942 – 10 January 2018) was a Mongolian boxer. He competed at the 1972 Summer Olympics and the 1976 Summer Olympics.
