= Damiano Lassandro =

Italian boxer (born 1947)

Personal information
- Nationality: Italian
- Born: 18 December 1947 (age 78) Bari, Italy
- Height: 173 cm (5 ft 8 in)

Sport
- Sport: Boxing
- Weight class: Welterweight (-67 kg)
Medal record
European Championships
| Bronze medal – third place | 1971 Madrid | -67 kg |
Mediterranean Games
| Bronze medal – third place | 1971 Izmir | -67 kg |

Damiano Lassandro (born 18 December 1947) is an Italian boxer. He competed in the men's welterweight event at the 1972 Summer Olympics.
