= Win Maung (boxer) =

Burmese boxer

Win Maung (Burmese: ဝင်းမောင် [wɪ́ɰ̃ màʊɰ̃]; born 1 February 1946) is a Burmese boxer, who competed in the 1972 Summer Olympics in Munich. Competing in the Bantamweight category, he lost to Orlando Martínez of Cuba in the second round.
