= Wang Chee-yen =

Taiwanese boxer (born 1946)

Personal information
- Nationality: Taiwanese
- Born: 20 December 1946 (age 78); Taipei, Taiwan

Sport
- Sport: Boxing

Wang Chee-yen (Chinese: 王基瑩; pinyin: Wáng Jīyíng; born 20 December 1946) is a Taiwanese boxer. He competed at the 1964 Summer Olympics, the 1968 Summer Olympics and the 1972 Summer Olympics. At the 1964 Summer Olympics, he lost to Dominador Calumarde of the Philippines.
