= Abdel Aziz Hammi =

Tunisian boxer (born 1949)

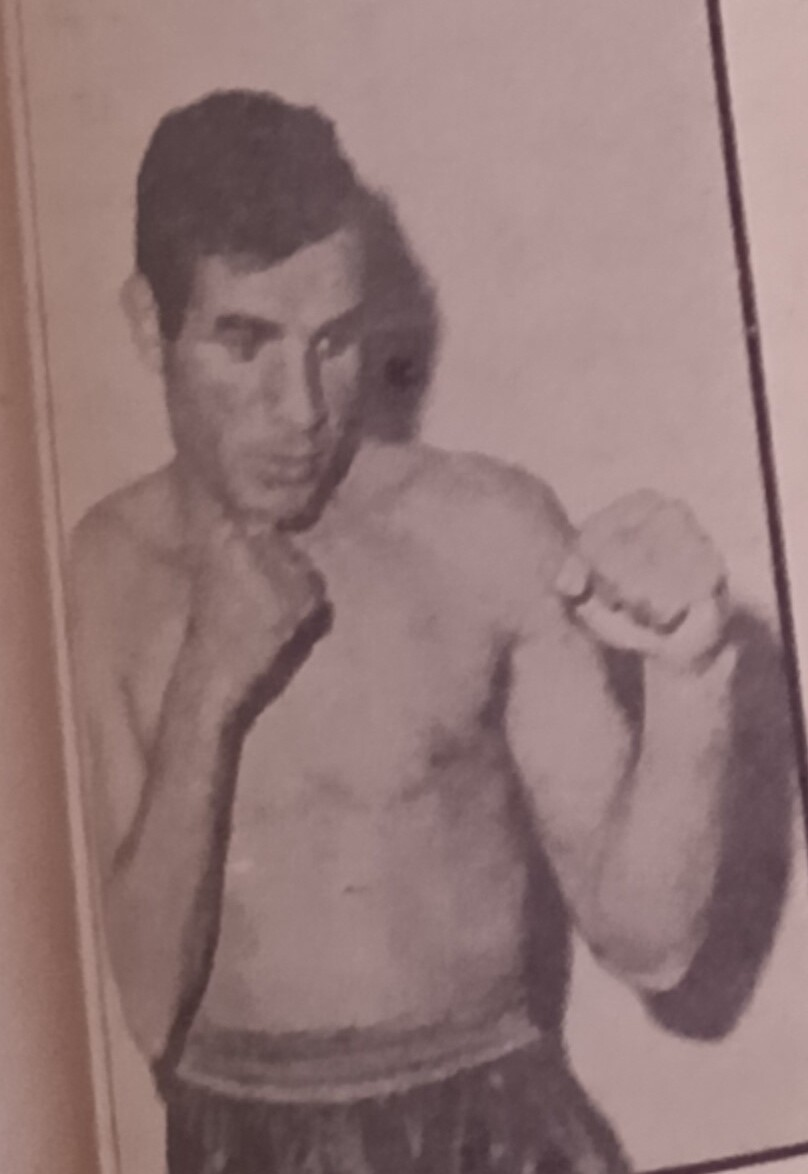

Personal information
- Nationality: Tunisian
- Born: 20 January 1949 (age 77)

Sport
- Sport: Boxing

Abdel Aziz Hammi (born 20 January 1949) is a Tunisian boxer. He competed in the men's bantamweight event at the 1972 Summer Olympics.
