= Boxing at the 1972 Summer Olympics =

Coordinates: 48.1327°N 11.5472°E

Boxing at the Games of the XX Olympiad
- Venue: Boxhalle
- Dates: 27 August-10 September 1972
- Competitors: 354 from 80 nations

These are the final results for the boxing competition at the 1972 Summer Olympics. The competition was held from 27 August to 10 September with the participation of 354 fighters from 80 countries.

Event	Gold	Silver	Bronze
Light flyweight	György Gedó; Hungary	Kim U-gil; North Korea	Ralph Evans; Great Britain; Enrique Rodríguez; Spain
Flyweight	Georgi Kostadinov; Bulgaria	Leo Rwabwogo; Uganda	Leszek Błażyński; Poland; Douglas Rodríguez; Cuba
Bantamweight	Orlando Martínez; Cuba	Alfonso Zamora; Mexico	Ricardo Carreras; United States; George Turpin; Great Britain
Featherweight	Boris Kuznetsov; Soviet Union	Philip Waruinge; Kenya	András Botos; Hungary; Clemente Rojas; Colombia
Lightweight	Jan Szczepański; Poland	László Orbán; Hungary	Samuel Mbugua; Kenya; Alfonso Pérez; Colombia
Light welterweight	Sugar Ray Seales; United States	Angel Angelov; Bulgaria	Issaka Daborg; Niger; Zvonimir Vujin; Yugoslavia
Welterweight	Emilio Correa; Cuba	János Kajdi; Hungary	Dick Murunga; Kenya; Jesse Valdez; United States
Light middleweight	Dieter Kottysch; West Germany	Wiesław Rudkowski; Poland	Alan Minter; Great Britain; Peter Tiepold; East Germany
Middleweight	Vyacheslav Lemeshev; Soviet Union	Reima Virtanen; Finland	Prince Amartey; Ghana; Marvin Johnson; United States
Light heavyweight	Mate Parlov; Yugoslavia	Gilberto Carrillo; Cuba	Janusz Gortat; Poland; Isaac Ikhouria; Nigeria
Heavyweight	Teófilo Stevenson; Cuba	Ion Alexe; Romania	Peter Hussing; West Germany; Hasse Thomsén; Sweden

== Medal table ==
Rank	Nation	Gold	Silver	Bronze	Total
1	Cuba	3	1	1	5
2	Soviet Union	2	0	0	2
3	Hungary	1	2	1	4
4	Poland	1	1	2	4
5	Bulgaria	1	1	0	2
6	United States	1	0	3	4
7	West Germany	1	0	1	2
7	Yugoslavia	1	0	1	2
9	Kenya	0	1	2	3
10	Finland	0	1	0	1
10	Mexico	0	1	0	1
10	North Korea	0	1	0	1
10	Romania	0	1	0	1
10	Uganda	0	1	0	1
15	Great Britain	0	0	3	3
16	Colombia	0	0	2	2
17	East Germany	0	0	1	1
17	Ghana	0	0	1	1
17	Niger	0	0	1	1
17	Nigeria	0	0	1	1
17	Spain	0	0	1	1
17	Sweden	0	0	1	1
Totals (22 entries)		11	11	22	44
