= Joseph Destimo =

Ghanaian boxer

Personal information
- Nationality: Ghanaian
- Born: 22 September 1943 (age 81); Ho, Ghana

Sport
- Sport: Boxing

Joseph Destimo (born 22 September 1943) is a Ghanaian boxer. He competed at the 1968 Summer Olympics and the 1972 Summer Olympics. At the 1968 Summer Olympics, he defeated Walter Henry of Canada, before losing to Servílio de Oliveira of Brazil.
