= Ferry Moniaga =

Indonesian boxer (born 1949)

Personal information
- Nationality: Indonesian
- Born: 14 September 1949 (age 76) Tanjung Pinang, Dutch East Indies

Sport
- Sport: Boxing

Ferry Moniaga (born 14 September 1949) is an Indonesian boxer. He competed in the men's bantamweight event at the 1972 Summer Olympics.
