= Juan Francisco Rodríguez =

Spanish boxer (1949–2019)

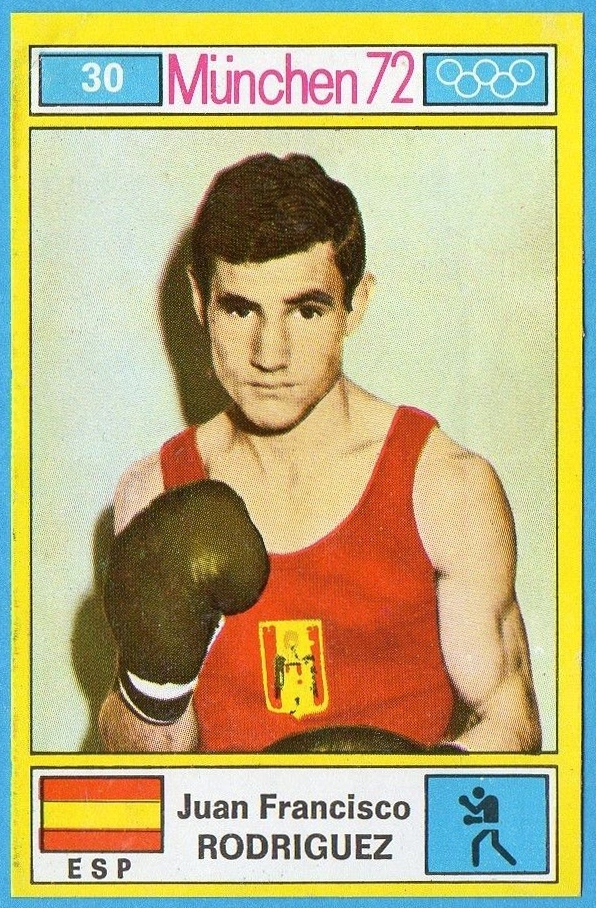

Personal information
- Born: 12 November 1949 Almería, Spain
- Died: 16 April 2019 (aged 69)
- Height: 1.57 m (5 ft 2 in)
- Weight: Bantamweight

Boxing career

Boxing record
- Total fights: 34
- Wins: 20
- Win by KO: 9
- Losses: 9
- Draws: 4
Medal record
Representing Spain
European Amateur Boxing Championships
Gold medal – first place	1971 Madrid	-51 kg
Mediterranean Games
Bronze medal – third place	1971 Izmir	-54 kg

Juan Francisco Rodríguez Márquez (12 November 1949 – 16 April 2019) was a Spanish boxer. As an amateur he won the 1971 European flyweight title and reached the quarterfinals at the 1972 Summer Olympics. At the 1976 Summer Olympics, he was stopped in the second bout by the eventual silver medalist Charles Mooney.

After the 1976 Olympics, Rodríguez turned professional and fought until 1982. He challenged Carlos Zárate Serna for the Mexican's WBC world bantamweight title in a 1977 fight held at Madrid, but lost by technical knockout. Next year he won the European title.

== 1976 Olympic record ==
Below are the results of Juan Francisco Rodriguez, a Spanish bantamweight boxer, who competed at the 1976 Montreal Olympics:

- Round of 64: defeated Anthony Abacheng (Ghana) on points, 5-0
- Round of 32: lost to Charles Mooney (United States) on points, 1-4
