= Aldo Cosentino =

French boxer (1947–2023)

Personal information
- Nationality: French
- Born: 19 October 1947 Tunis, French Tunisia
- Died: 8 October 2023 (aged 75)

Sport
- Sport: Boxing

Aldo Cosentino (19 October 1947 – 8 October 2023) was a French boxer.

== Life and career ==
Born in Tunis, following the Tunisian independence, Cosentino moved to Paris with his family in 1956. A seven times national champion in the bantamweight class, he won a silver medal at the 1969 European Amateur Boxing Championships and a gold medal at the 1973 European Amateur Boxing Championships. He competed at the 1968 Summer Olympics, 1972 Summer Olympics, and the 1976 Summer Olympics. After his retirement, he became a coach for the French national team. Cosentino died on 8 October 2023, at the age of 75.
