= Rocky Mattioli =

Australian boxer

Personal information
- Nationality: Australian
- Born: Rocco Mattioli; 20 September 1953 (age 72) Ripa Teatina, Abruzzo, Italy
- Height: 5 ft 6 1/2 in (169 cm)
- Weight: Light middleweight

Boxing career
- Reach: 67 in (170 cm)
- Stance: Orthodox

Boxing record
- Total fights: 73
- Wins: 64
- Win by KO: 51
- Losses: 7
- Draws: 2

Rocky Mattioli (born Rocco Mattioli, 20 September 1953) is an Italian-born Australian former boxer at junior middleweight, and former world champion.

Rocky was the 2004 Inductee for the Australian National Boxing Hall of Fame Moderns category.

== Career ==
Mattioli was born in Ripa Teatina, near Chieti, in Abruzzo in central Italy. He emigrated to Australia with his family at the age of six and lived in Morwell, Victoria.

He turned professional in 1970 and started training with Italian trainer Arnold Rossi. In 1977, he captured the WBC Light Middleweight Title with a KO over Eckhard Dagge. He defended the title twice before losing it to Maurice Hope in 1979 by TKO. In 1980, he had a rematch with Hope, but again was TKO'd, in the 11th round. He retired in 1982, settling in Milan.

== Professional boxing record ==
73 fights	64 wins	7 losses
By knockout	51	4
By decision	13	3
Draws	2	

No.	Result	Record	Opponent	Type	Round, time	Date	Location	Notes
73	Win	64–7–2	Pedro Guerrero	KO	6	1982-08-19	Olympic Auditorium, Los Angeles, California, U.S.	
72	Win	63–7–2	Teo Dominguez	TKO	3	1982-03-09	Showboat Hotel and Casino, Las Vegas, Nevada, U.S.	
71	Win	62–7–2	Abraham Lara	KO	2	1982-02-18	Olympic Auditorium, Los Angeles, California, U.S.	
70	Win	61–7–2	Rudy Barro	TKO	2	1982-02-09	Showboat Hotel and Casino, Las Vegas, Nevada, U.S.	
69	Loss	60–7–2	Clement Tshinza	TKO	9	1981-06-11	Milan, Italy	
68	Win	60–6–2	Steve Hopkin	TKO	9	1981-04-29	Gatteo, Italy	
67	Loss	59–6–2	Maurice Hope	TKO	11	1980-07-12	Wembley Conference Centre, London, England, U.K.	For WBC light middleweight title
66	Win	59–5–2	Rafael Rodriguez	KO	8	1980-05-30	Rome, Italy	
65	Win	58–5–2	Jamie Thomas	KO	2	1980-05-02	Rome, Italy	
64	Win	57–5–2	Jesse Carter	KO	1	1980-03-21	Bologna, Italy	
63	Win	56–5–2	Pat Murphy	KO	2	1979-12-14	Milan, Italy	
62	Win	55–5–2	Roy Johnson	KO	4	1979-11-23	Pordenone, Italy	
61	Win	54–5–2	Leon McCallum	TKO	5	1979-10-12	Rome, Italy	
60	Loss	53–5–2	Maurice Hope	TKO	9	1979-03-04	Teatro Ariston, Sanremo, Italy	Lost WBC light middleweight title
59	Win	53–4–2	Freddie Boynton	TKO	7	1978-09-29	Milan, Italy	
58	Win	52–4–2	José Durán	KO	5	1978-05-14	Stadio Adriatico, Pescara, Italy	Retained WBC light middleweight title
57	Win	51–4–2	Elisha Obed	KO	7	1978-03-11	Kooyong Stadium, Melbourne, Australia	Retained WBC light middleweight title
56	Win	50–4–2	Jose Rodriguez	UD	10	1978-01-21	Caesars Palace, Las Vegas, Nevada, U.S.	
55	Win	49–4–2	Larry Paul	PTS	10	1977-12-02	Milan, Italy	
54	Win	48–4–2	Eckhard Dagge	KO	5	1977-08-06	Deutschlandhalle, Charlottenburg, Germany	Won WBC light middleweight title
53	Win	47–4–2	Angel Jose Ortiz	KO	3	1977-06-18	Palazzetto dello Sport, Rome, Italy	
52	Win	46–4–2	Arnoldo Olivares	TKO	5	1977-02-27	Bellaria, Italy	
51	Win	45–4–2	Trevor Francis	TKO	6	1977-01-28	Faenza, Italy	
50	Win	44–4–2	Alfonso Hayman	KO	10	1976-12-03	Milan, Italy	
49	Win	43–4–2	Ralph Palladin	TKO	7	1976-10-22	Bologna, Italy	
48	Win	42–4–2	Pablo Rodriguez	TKO	2	1976-10-01	Palasport di San Siro, Milan, Italy	
47	Win	41–4–2	Chucho Garcia	TKO	6	1976-05-21	Palasport di San Siro, Milan, Italy	
46	Draw	40–4–2	Bruno Arcari	PTS	10	1976-04-03	Palasport di San Siro, Milan, Italy	97-96, 96-96, 97-97.
45	Win	40–4–1	Cubby Jackson	UD	10	1976-02-06	Milan, Italy	100-94, 100-94, 99-92.
44	Win	39–4–1	Domenico Di Jorio	TKO	6	1975-11-28	Palazzo dello Sport, Milan, Italy	
43	Win	38–4–1	Jørgen Hansen	TKO	7	1975-10-24	Milan, Italy	
42	Loss	37–4–1	Harold Weston	PTS	10	1975-09-19	Festival Hall, Melbourne, Australia	
41	Win	37–3–1	Fernand Marcotte	TKO	9	1975-08-22	Festival Hall, Melbourne, Australia	Referee stopped the bout at 2:40 of the ninth round.
40	Win	36–3–1	Mimoun Mohatar	UD	10	1975-06-06	Palazzo dello Sport, Milan, Italy	
39	Win	35–3–1	Chris Fernandez	KO	4	1975-05-09	Palazzo dello Sport, Milan, Italy	
38	Win	34–3–1	Billy Backus	KO	5	1975-04-11	Festival Hall, Melbourne, Australia	
37	Loss	33–3–1	Ali Afakasi	TKO	12	1975-02-14	Festival Hall, Melbourne, Australia	Australasian Welterweight Title.
36	Win	33–2–1	Ray Chavez Guerrero	PTS	10	1974-10-18	Festival Hall, Melbourne, Australia	
35	Win	32–2–1	Eddie Perkins	UD	10	1974-08-16	Festival Hall, Melbourne, Australia	48-45, 49-45, 50-44.
34	Win	31–2–1	Dommy Cotacte	TKO	4	1974-07-26	Festival Hall, Melbourne, Australia	
33	Win	30–2–1	Dave Oropeza	TKO	6	1974-06-25	Melbourne Town Hall, Melbourne, Australia	
32	Win	29–2–1	Jacques van Mellaerts	TKO	9	1974-05-11	Une Grande Soiree Stadium, Noumea, New Caledonia	Referee stopped the bout at 2:15 of the ninth round.
31	Win	28–2–1	Jose Luis Baltazar	PTS	10	1974-04-25	Festival Hall, Melbourne, Australia	
30	Win	27–2–1	Dennis Enright	KO	3	1974-03-22	Festival Hall, Melbourne, Australia	
29	Win	26–2–1	Billy O'Donnell	TKO	3	1974-03-13	Iceland Arena, Melbourne, Australia	
28	Win	25–2–1	Trevor Francis	TKO	8	1973-08-24	Brisbane, Australia	
27	Win	24–2–1	Pongi Lee	PTS	15	1973-07-12	San Remo Ballroom, Melbourne, Australia	Australasian Welterweight Title.
26	Win	23–2–1	Jeff White	KO	12	1973-05-17	San Remo Ballroom, Melbourne, Australia	Australian Welterweight Title.
25	Win	22–2–1	Eric King	KO	2	1973-04-26	San Remo Ballroom, Melbourne, Australia	
24	Win	21–2–1	Ted Gray	KO	4	1973-04-19	Blacktown RSL Club, Sydney, Australia	
23	Win	20–2–1	Kolaia Bauli	TKO	6	1971-12-17	Festival Hall, Melbourne, Australia	
22	Win	19–2–1	Paul Moore	SD	10	1971-11-25	Brunswick Metropolitan Cinema, Melbourne, Australia	
21	Loss	18–2–1	Paul Moore	SD	10	1971-09-23	Brunswick Cinema International, Melbourne, Australia	47-48, 48-43, 46-47.
20	Win	18–1–1	Steve Hallcroft	TKO	6	1971-08-30	Perth, Western Australia, Australia	
19	Win	17–1–1	Tiger Peni	KO	5	1971-07-26	Festival Hall, Melbourne, Australia	
18	Win	16–1–1	Sila Nomura	PTS	8	1971-06-28	Festival Hall, Melbourne, Australia	
17	Win	15–1–1	Steve Ayerst	PTS	8	1971-06-07	Festival Hall, Melbourne, Australia	
16	Draw	14–1–1	Bill Fatu	PTS	8	1971-05-10	Festival Hall, Melbourne, Australia	
15	Win	14–1	Doug Green	TKO	3	1971-04-19	Festival Hall, Melbourne, Australia	
14	Win	13–1	Red Durange	TKO	4	1971-04-05	Festival Hall, Melbourne, Australia	
13	Win	12–1	Bevan Minnett	TKO	4	1970-11-30	Festival Hall, Melbourne, Australia	
12	Win	11–1	George Kencheff	TKO	5	1970-11-09	Festival Hall, Melbourne, Australia	
11	Win	10–1	Alby Roberts	TKO	5	1970-10-19	Festival Hall, Melbourne, Australia	
10	Win	9–1	Johnny Todd	TKO	2	1970-10-05	Festival Hall, Melbourne, Australia	
9	Win	8–1	Ray Cannon	TKO	3	1970-08-03	Festival Hall, Melbourne, Australia	
8	Win	7–1	Billy Murphy Jr.	PTS	6	1970-07-06	Festival Hall, Melbourne, Australia	
7	Win	6–1	Billy Stewart	KO	4	1970-05-29	Morwell, Australia	
6	Loss	5–1	Ricky Day	PTS	6	1970-05-04	Festival Hall, Melbourne, Australia	
5	Win	5–0	Bernie Martin	TKO	6	1970-04-23	Karma Hall, Morwell, Australia	
4	Win	4–0	Tom Roberts	TKO	4	1970-04-02	South Sydney Rugby League Club, Sydney, Australia	
3	Win	3–0	Bernie Martin	KO	4	1970-03-23	Morwell, Australia	
2	Win	2–0	Glenn Grinsted	PTS	4	1970-03-16	Festival Hall, Melbourne, Australia	
1	Win	1–0	Tony Salta	KO	2	1970-03-09	Festival Hall, Melbourne, Australia	

== See also ==
- List of world light-middleweight boxing champions

Sporting positions
World boxing titles
Preceded by Eckhard Dagge	WBC super welterweight champion 6 August 1977 – 4 March 1979	Succeeded by Maurice Hope
