= Eckhard Dagge =

German boxer (1948–2006)

Personal information
- Nationality: german
- Born: 27 February 1948 Berlin, Allied-occupied Germany
- Died: 4 April 2006 (aged 58) Hamburg, Germany
- Height: 5 ft 11 in (180 cm)
- Weight: Light middleweight; Middleweight

Boxing career
- Reach: 73 in (185 cm)
- Stance: Orthodox

Boxing record
- Total fights: 32
- Wins: 26
- Win by KO: 16
- Losses: 5
- Draws: 1

Eckhard Dagge (27 February 1948 – 4 April 2006) was a German professional boxer who competed in the super welterweight division.

Eckhard Dagge was Germany's second world champion, after Max Schmeling, holding the World Boxing Council Light Middleweight title from 1976 to 1977. Dagge also held German National and European titles, during his ten-year career.

== Background ==
Dagge was born in Berlin, Allied-occupied Germany, in 1948. He learned how to fight in the bars and taverns of Hamburg. He would later embark on an amateur career, in which he won 66 out of 80 bouts, before falling short of making the 1972 Olympic Team. Dagge turned professional in 1973, at the age of 25.

== Professional career ==
Dagge would win the German Middleweight title, in his 6th bout. Dagge would follow up with wins over notable, but faded fighters Denny Moyer and Manuel González. In 1974, Dagge challenged Jose Manuel Duran for the European Light Middleweight title, losing by 11th-round TKO. He came back the next year however, and stopped Duran in the 9th round, to win the title. He would defend the title once, before losing it by decision to Vito Antuofermo.

Dagge earned a title shot against WBC Light Middleweight champion Elisha Obed on 17 June 1976. Dagge pulled off a stunning upset of Obed, winning by 10th-round TKO, to win the title in Berlin. Dagge was scheduled to defend his title against Sugar Ray Seales. However Seales pulled out a of the fight and former champion Emile Griffith stepped in as a replacement. The result was Dagge winning a controversial majority decision. He followed this up with a draw over England's Maurice Hope, a future world champion. Dagge then faced Australia-based Italian Rocky Mattioli on 6 August 1977, and was knocked out in the 5th round. Dagge would win six more bouts over lesser opposition until he was stopped by Brian Anderson in 1981, he retired from the ring shortly thereafter.

== Professional boxing record ==
32 fights	26 wins	5 losses
By knockout	16	3
By decision	10	2
Draws	1	

No.	Result	Record	Opponent	Type	Round, time	Date	Location	Notes
32	Loss	26–5–1	(United Kingdom) Brian Anderson	TKO	2	06/11/1981	Kiel, West Germany	
31	Win	26–4–1	(United States) Bruce Strauss	PTS	8	25/09/1981	Cologne, West Germany	
30	Win	25–4–1	(United Kingdom) George Walker	PTS	10	10/04/1981	Kiel, West Germany	
29	Win	24–4–1	(Austria) Esperno Postl	TKO	7	13/02/1981	Kiel, West Germany	
28	Win	23–4–1	(United States) Larry Davis	PTS	10	06/05/1978	Frankfurt, West Germany	
27	Win	22–4–1	(The Bahamas) Rennie Pinder	KO	4	07/04/1978	Berlin, West Germany	
26	Win	21–4–1	(United States) Jimmy Savage	KO	8	10/12/1977	Berlin, West Germany	
25	Loss	20–4–1	(Italy) Rocky Mattioli	KO	5	06/08/1977	Deutschlandhalle, Charlottenburg, West Germany	Lost WBC light middleweight title
24	Draw	20–3–1	(United Kingdom) Maurice Hope	PTS	15	15/03/1977	Deutschlandhalle, Charlottenburg, West Germany	Retained WBC light middleweight title
23	Win	20–3	(United States Virgin Islands) Emile Griffith	MD	15	18/09/1976	Deutschlandhalle, Charlottenburg, West Germany	Retained WBC light middleweight title
22	Win	19–3	(The Bahamas) Elisha Obed	TKO	10	18/06/1976	Deutschlandhalle, Charlottenburg, West Germany	Won WBC light middleweight title
21	Win	18–3	(France) Marcel Giordanella	KO	7	02/04/1976	Kiel, West Germany	
20	Loss	17–3	(Italy) Vito Antuofermo	PTS	15	16/01/1976	Deutschlandhalle, Charlottenburg, West Germany	Lost EBU light middleweight title
19	Win	17–2	(Austria) Franz Csandl	TKO	7	04/11/1975	Stadthalle, Vienna, Austria	Retained EBU light middleweight title
18	Win	16–2	(Spain) José Durán	TKO	9	24/06/1975	Berlin, West Germany	Won EBU light middleweight title
17	Loss	15–2	(Trinidad and Tobago) Carlos Marks	PTS	10	18/03/1975	Berlin, West Germany	
16	Win	15–1	(France) Pascal Zito	PTS	10	30/11/1974	Munich, West Germany	
15	Win	14–1	(France) Jules Bellaiche	PTS	8	05/11/1974	Berlin, West Germany	
14	Loss	13–1	(Spain) José Durán	TKO	11	03/09/1974	Berlin, West Germany	For EBU Light Middleweight Title
13	Win	13–0	(United States) Billy Backus	TKO	3	20/06/1974	Berlin, West Germany	
12	Win	12–0	(United States) Manuel Gonzalez	PTS	10	14/05/1974	Deutschlandhalle, Charlottenburg, West Germany	
11	Win	11–0	(United States) Denny Moyer	PTS	10	20/02/1974	Deutschlandhalle, Charlottenburg, West Germany	
10	Win	10–0	(France) Francis Vermandere	KO	7	09/11/1973	Berlin, West Germany	
9	Win	9–0	(Spain) Jose Maria Madrazo	PTS	8	26/10/1973	Hamburg, West Germany	
8	Win	8–0	(Trinidad and Tobago) Matt Donovan	KO	2	28/09/1973	Berlin, West Germany	
7	Win	7–0	(Zaire) Shako Mamba	PTS	10	31/08/1973	Lübeck, West Germany	
6	Win	6–0	(Germany) Klaus-Peter Tombers	TKO	5	03/06/1973	Berlin, West Germany	Won BDB German Middleweight Title
5	Win	5–0	(Italy) Antonio Rimasti	KO	1	11/05/1973	Wiesbaden, West Germany	
4	Win	4–0	(Austria) Anton Schnedl	TKO	4	27/04/1973	Berlin, West Germany	
3	Win	3–0	(Suriname) Waldi Clere	KO	1	30/03/1973	Oldenburg, West Germany	
2	Win	2–0	(Germany) Ferzi Isir	TKO	1	08/03/1973	Lübeck, West Germany	
1	Win	1–0	(Germany) Hans Heukeshoven	KO	1	02/03/1973	Berlin, West Germany	

== Life after boxing ==
Dagge had a reputation as a wild man during his career and afterwards, as he struggled with alcoholism. Dagge worked with Universum after his pro career ended, training Dariusz Michalczewski, Michael Loewe, and Mario Schiesser. However, he was dismissed from his job as a manager in 1994, due to absenteeism and his problems with alcoholism. Dagge died on 4 April 2006 in Hamburg, Germany, after a battle with cancer.

== See also ==
- List of world light-middleweight boxing champions

Sporting positions
Regional boxing titles
Preceded by José Durán	EBU super-welterweight champion 24 June 1975 – 16 January 1976	Succeeded by Vito Antuofermo
World boxing titles
Preceded by Elisha Obed	WBC super welterweight champion 18 June 1976 – 6 August 1977	Succeeded by Rocky Mattioli
