= Franz Csandl =

Austrian boxer (1948–2023)

Personal information
- Born: 24 September 1948 Vienna, Austria
- Died: 1 August 2023 (aged 74) Austria
- Height: 172 cm (5 ft 8 in)

Boxing career
- Reach: 188 cm (74 in)
- Stance: Southpaw

Boxing record
- Total fights: 26
- Wins: 23
- Win by KO: 9
- Losses: 3

Franz Csandl (24 September 1948 – 1 August 2023) was an Austrian professional boxer. He competed in the men's light middleweight event at the 1972 Summer Olympics.

== Boxing career ==
Csandl turned professional shortly after he competed in the 1972 Summer Olympics. He fought actively from 1972 till 1976, where he challenged twice for the European light middleweight title against future world champions Jose Duran and Eckhard Dagge but came up short in both occasions. Csandl retired in June 1976, compiling a record of twenty-three wins and 3 losses.

== Professional boxing record ==
26 fights	23 wins	3 losses
By knockout	9	1
By decision	14	2

No.	Result	Record	Opponent	Type	Round, time	Date	Location	Notes
26	Loss	23–3	Clement Tshinza	PTS	8	18 Jun 1976	Deutschlandhalle, Berlin, Germany	
25	Win	23–2	Gene Wells	KO	7 (8)	2 Apr 1976	Kiel, Schleswig-Holstein, Germany	
24	Loss	22–2	Eckhard Dagge	TKO	7 (15)	4 Nov 1975	Stadthalle, Vienna, Austria	For European light middleweight title
23	Win	22–1	Burhan Yeşilbağ	KO	6 (8)	26 Sep 1975	Ketsch, Baden-Württemberg, Germany	
22	Win	21–1	Alfred Fries	TKO	4 (8)	14 Jun 1975	Berlin, Berlin State, Germany	
21	Win	20–1	Eddie Perkins	PTS	8	31 May 1975	Cologne, North Rhine-Westphalia, Germany	
20	Win	19–1	Denny Moyer	PTS	10	18 Mar 1975	Stadthalle, Vienna, Austria	
19	Loss	18–1	José Durán	PTS	15	7 Jan 1975	Stadthalle, Vienna, Austria	For European light middleweight title
18	Win	18–0	Carmelo Martín	PTS	6	5 Nov 1974	Berlin, Berlin State, Germany	
17	Win	17–0	Vincent Parra	PTS	8	22 Oct 1974	Berlin, Berlin State, Germany	
16	Win	16–0	Manuel Gonzalez	PTS	10	17 Aug 1974	Zeltweg, Styria, Austria	
15	Win	15–0	Randolf Hombach	PTS	8	13 Jul 1974	Klagenfurt, Carinthia, Austria	
14	Win	14–0	Francis Vermandere	PTS	10	31 May 1974	Pinkafeld, Burgenland, Austria	
13	Win	13–0	Mimoun Mohatar	PTS	8	4 May 1974	Stadthalle, Vienna, Austria	
12	Win	12–0	Domenico Tiberia	TKO	2 (8)	1 Feb 1974	Stadthalle, Vienna, Austria	
11	Win	11–0	Jean-Baptiste Rolland	TKO	2 (8)	14 Dec 1973	Stadthalle, Vienna, Austria	
10	Win	10–0	Matt Donovan	PTS	8	6 Nov 1973	Vienna, Vienna Federal State, Austria	
9	Win	9–0	Adriano Rodrigues	PTS	6	4 Sep 1973	Stadthalle, Vienna, Austria	
8	Win	8–0	Günter Valtinke	TKO	2 (6)	11 Aug 1973	Pinkafeld, Burgenland, Austria	
7	Win	7–0	Mohammed Nefsi	PTS	6	28 Jul 1973	Kitzbühel, Tyrol, Austria	
6	Win	6–0	Alfred Fries	KO	3 (6)	26 May 1973	Wiener Stadthalle, Vienna, Austria	
5	Win	5–0	Kid Silent	KO	3 (8)	15 Mar 1973	Vienna, Vienna Federal State, Austria	
4	Win	4–0	Hans-Joachim Trautwein	PTS	4	30 Jan 1973	Stadthalle, Vienna, Austria	
3	Win	3–0	Günter Valtinke	PTS	4	12 Dec 1972	Stadthalle, Vienna, Austria	
2	Win	2–0	Günter Valtinke	PTS	4	12 Dec 1972	Stadthalle, Vienna, Austria	
1	Win	1–0	Hans Michel	KO	1 (6)	31 Oct 1972	Stadthalle, Vienna, Austria	

== Death ==
Csandl died of natural causes on 1 August 2023, at the age of 74. His funeral services were held on 10 August 2023.
