= Maurice Hope =

British boxer (born 1951)

Personal information
- Nationality: British
- Born: 6 December 1951 (age 74) St. John's, Antigua and Barbuda
- Height: 5 ft 8 1/2 in (174 cm)
- Weight: Light middleweight; Middleweight

Boxing career
- Reach: 69 in (175 cm)
- Stance: Southpaw

Boxing record
- Total fights: 35
- Wins: 30
- Win by KO: 24
- Losses: 4
- Draws: 1

Maurice Hope GCH OBE (born 6 December 1951) is a British former boxer, who was world junior middleweight champion. Born in Antigua, he grew up in Hackney, London. He represented Great Britain at the 1972 Summer Olympics in Munich, West Germany.

He is a Recipient of the Order of Princely Heritage.

== Boxing career ==
=== Amateur career ===
Maurice Hope was born in St. John's, Antigua, and moved at a very young age to the UK. Hope's aptitude towards boxing was evident early in childhood; he began to train as a very young boy. Hope went on to box at the 1972 Summer Olympics, where he would lose to German boxer János Kajdi in the quarter finals.

=== Professional career ===
Hope made his professional debut on 18 June 1973, defeating John Smith by decision in eight rounds at Nottingham.

On Hope's second fight, held on 25 September of that year, he scored his first knockout win, a victory in three rounds over Len Gibbs in Shoreditch. Hope won his first four professional fights.

On 21 November, he suffered his first defeat, being beaten by Mickey Flynn over eight rounds by decision.

After that loss, Hope went on to win five fights in a row, four by knockout, before winning his first regional belt, when he beat Larry Paul, 5 November 1974, by a knockout in round eight of a fifteen-round bout, at Wolverhampton, to win the British Jr. Middleweight title.

Hope then won three more fights, including one (a fourth-round knockout of Don Cobbs on 11 February 1975 at Royal Albert Hall) which was refereed by legendary referee Harry Gibbs, who also oversaw the refereeing of the Wilfredo Gómez-Carlos Zarate bout, among many other famous fights.

After these three wins, Hope went up in weight to fight for the vacant British Middleweight title, vacated by Kevin Finnegan, who, in turn, lost four times to Alan Minter. On 10 June, Hope was defeated by knockout for the first time, losing to Bunny Sterling in the eighth round for that regional title.

Hope's career took on an upwards movement after the loss to Sterling. He followed that loss with a knockout in a rematch against Larry Paul on 30 September at London's Empire Pool. This was the beginning of a four knockout win streak that took him to fight Tony Poole, 12 April 1976, for the vacant British Commonwealth Jr. Middleweight title. He won the regional belt by knocking out Poole in the twelfth round, and, after one more win, he met future world Middleweight champion Vito Antuofermo, on 10 October, at Rome, Italy, for the European Boxing Union's Jr. Middleweight title. Hope conquered his third regional title by knocking out Antuofermo (who would later last the full fifteen rounds in a fight with Marvin Hagler), in the fifteenth and last round. This bout was Hope's first fight abroad.

Having won three regional titles, Hope was ranked among the top Jr. Middleweight challengers by the WBC, and so, he obtained his first world title try, on 15 March 1977, against the WBC's world champion, Eckhard Dagge, in Berlin, Germany. After fifteen rounds, the fight was declared a draw (tie).

Hope regrouped with six wins in a row, before getting his second world title try. On 4 March 1979, he faced the then WBC world champion Rocky Mattioli in Sanremo, Italy. Hope became a world champion by knocking Mattioli out in the ninth round.

On 25 September, he defended the WBC's world title for the first time, knocking out Mike Baker in the seventh round, at London. His second defence, on 12 June 1980, was a rematch with Mattioli. This time, they fought in London, and Hope repeated his previous win, but with an eleventh round technical knockout instead. On 26 November, he defended his crown against well known Argentina contender Carlos Herrera (not to be confused with the Argentine boxer of the same name who was born in 1983) in London, winning by a fifteen-round decision.

Hope went to Las Vegas, for his next defence, which also turned out to be his first, and, ultimately, last fight in the United States. He planned to marry his girlfriend while in Las Vegas. On 23 May 1981, at the Caesars Palace, Hope lost the world Jr. Middleweight title to Wilfred Benítez, suffering a twelfth-round knockout that later made television sports show highlights. While Benitez became the first Latin American to win world titles in three different divisions, the youngest boxer in history to do so, and the first in 40 years to achieve the accomplishment, Hope had to be hospitalised, but he recuperated and was able to marry his girlfriend before returning to England.

After one more defeat, to Luigi Minchillo, Hope permanently retired from boxing. Throughout his career Hope was managed by his mentor Terry Lawless, whose stable of top-quality boxers also included John H Stracey, Jim Watt, Charlie Magri and Frank Bruno. Their PR was handled by Norman Giller who, like all the boxers apart from Scottish hero Watt, was based in East London. They all trained in the famous East End fight academy run by Lawless at the Royal Oak in Canning Town. Most of their major fights were under the umbrella of leading London promotion team of Harry Levene, Mike Barrett and Mickey Duff.

== Professional boxing record ==
35 fights	30 wins	4 losses
By knockout	24	2
By decision	6	2
Draws	1	

No.	Result	Record	Opponent	Type	Round	Date	Location	Notes
35	Loss	30–4–1	Luigi Minchillo	SD	12	Mar 30, 1982	Wembley Arena, Wembley, London, England, U.K.	
34	Loss	30–3–1	Wilfred Benítez	KO	12 (15)	May 23, 1981	Caesars Palace, Paradise, Nevada, U.S.	Lost WBC light-middleweight title
33	Win	30–2–1	Carlos Maria del Valle Herrera	UD	15	Nov 26, 1980	Wembley Arena, Wembley, London, England, U.K.	Retained WBC light-middleweight title
32	Win	29–2–1	Rocky Mattioli	TKO	11 (15)	Jul 12, 1980	Conference Centre, Wembley, London, England, U.K.	Retained WBC light-middleweight title
31	Win	28–2–1	Mike Baker	TKO	7 (15)	Sep 25, 1979	Empire Pool, Wembley, London, England, U.K.	Retained WBC light-middleweight title
30	Win	27–2–1	Rocky Mattioli	TKO	9 (15)	Mar 4, 1979	Teatro Ariston, San Remo, Liguria, Italy	Won WBC light-middleweight title
29	Win	26–2–1	Alfonso Hayman	TKO	5 (10)	Sep 26, 1978	Empire Pool, Wembley, London, England, U.S.	
28	Win	25–2–1	Melvin Dennis	PTS	10	Apr 4, 1978	Royal Albert Hall, Kensington, London, England, U.S.	
27	Win	24–2–1	Vincenzo Ungaro	KO	5 (10)	Jan 24, 1978	Royal Albert Hall, Kensington, London, England, U.S.	
26	Win	23–2–1	Joel Bonnetaz	KO	5 (15)	Nov 8, 1977	Empire Pool, Wembley, London, England, U.S.	Retained EBU light-middleweight title
25	Win	22–2–1	Tony Lopes	TKO	6 (10)	Sep 27, 1977	Empire Pool, Wembley, London, England, U.S.	
24	Win	21–2–1	Frank Wissenbach	MD	15	May 7, 1977	Congress Centre, Hamburg, West Germany	Retained EBU light-middleweight title
23	Draw	20–2–1	Eckhard Dagge	SD	15	Mar 15, 1977	Deutschlandhalle, Charlottenburg, Berlin, West Germany	For WBC light-middleweight title
22	Win	20–2	Vito Antuofermo	TKO	15 (15)	Oct 1, 1976	Palazzetto dello Sport, Roma, Lazio, Italy	Won EBU light-middleweight title
21	Win	19–2	Tim McHugh	TKO	4 (8)	Jun 1, 1976	Royal Albert Hall, Kensington, London, England, U.K.	
20	Win	18–2	Tony Poole	TKO	12 (15)	Apr 20, 1976	York Hall, Bethnal Green, London, England, U.K.	Retained BBBofC British light-middleweight title; Won vacant Commonwealth light-middleweight title
19	Win	17–2	Kevin White	TKO	4 (10)	Mar 20, 1976	Empire Pool, Wembley, London, England, U.K.	
18	Win	16–2	Mimoun Mohatar	TKO	2 (10)	Mar 2, 1976	Royal Albert Hall, Kensington, London, England, U.K.	
17	Win	15–2	Carl Speare	TKO	4 (8)	Feb 25, 1976	York Hall, Bethnal Green, London, England, U.K.	
16	Win	14–2	Larry Paul	TKO	4 (15)	Sep 30, 1975	Empire Pool, Wembley, London, England, U.K.	Retained BBBofC light-middleweight title
15	Loss	13–2	Bunny Sterling	TKO	8 (15)	Jun 10, 1975	Café Royal, Piccadilly, London, England, U.K.	For vacant BBBofC middleweight title
14	Win	13–1	Jürgen Voss	KO	3 (10)	Apr 2, 1975	Cunard Hotel, Hammersmith, London, England, U.K.	
13	Win	12–1	Don Cobbs	TKO	4 (10)	Feb 11, 1975	Royal Albert Hall, Kensington, London, England, U.K.	
12	Win	11–1	Cuby Jackson	TKO	7 (8)	Dec 10, 1974	Ice Rink, Nottingham, England, U.K.	
11	Win	10–1	Larry Paul	KO	8 (15)	Nov 5, 1974	Civic Hall, Wolverhampton, U.K.	Won BBBofC British light-middleweight title
10	Win	9–1	Dave Davies	TKO	8 (10)	May 13, 1974	Hilton Hotel, Mayfair, London, U.K.	
9	Win	8–1	John Smith	KO	2 (8)	Apr 17, 1974	Piccadilly Hotel, Manchester, Lancashire, U.K.	
8	Win	7–1	Mike Manley	TKO	4 (8)	Apr 1, 1974	Café Royal, Piccadilly, London, England, U.K.	
7	Win	6–1	Mick Hussey	KO	3 (8)	Mar 12, 1974	Empire Pool, Wembley, London, England, U.K.	
6	Win	5–1	Mike Manley	PTS	8	Jan 28, 1974	Great International Sporting Club, Nottingham, England, U.K.	
5	Loss	4–1	Mickey Flynn	PTS	8	Nov 21, 1973	Grosvenor House, Mayfair, London, England, U.K.	
4	Win	4–0	Arthur Winfield	TKO	4 (8)	Oct 23, 1973	Ice Rink, Nottingham, England, U.K.	
3	Win	3–0	Pat Brogan	PTS	8	Oct 1, 1973	Great International Sporting Club, Nottingham, England, U.K.	
2	Win	2–0	Len Gibbs	RTD	3 (8)	Sep 25, 1973	Shoreditch Town Hall, Shoreditch, London, England, U.K.	
1	Win	1–0	John Smith	PTS	8	Jun 18, 1973	Great International Sporting Club, Nottingham, England, U.K.	

== Later life ==
Hope continued in the public eye in England, doing various jobs, and he has enjoyed his earnings as a boxer. Furthermore, with Benitez suffering from diabetes and boxing-related conditions, he later became a frequent visitor to Puerto Rico, where he and Benitez sometimes spent days talking about their old days as boxers. Hope now lives in Hackney; he was involved with boxing training for the local residents and youths in upper Clapton. Hope also has property in Antigua after being given land by the government to mark his achievements in the ring. Hope has been an ambassador for Antigua and is happily involved in the island's tourist industry.

On 11 December 2024, the High Commission of Antigua and Barbuda in London hosted the launch of “Land of Hope and Glory“, a book-interview by Maurice Hope with sports analyst Jaydee Dyer in which Hope talks about how he overcame the hardships of the Windrush generation to become a world-champion boxer from Antigua.

In recognition of Hope's achievements while a resident, the London Borough of Hackney named a major cycle route after him.

== See also ==
- List of world light-middleweight boxing champions
- List of British world boxing champions
- List of outright winners of the Lonsdale belt

Sporting positions
Regional boxing titles
Preceded by Larry Paul	British super welterweight champion 5 November 1974 – 1976; Vacated	Vacant Title next held by Jimmy Batten
Vacant Title last held by Charkey Ramon	Commonwealth super welterweight champion 20 April 1976 – 1976; Vacated	Vacant Title next held by Kenny Bristol
Preceded by Vito Antuofermo	EBU super welterweight champion 1 October 1976 – 1978; Vacated	Vacant Title next held by Gilbert Cohen
World boxing titles
Preceded by Rocky Mattioli	WBC super welterweight champion 4 March 1979 – 23 May 1981	Succeeded by Wilfred Benítez
