= Elisha Obed =

Bahamian boxer

Personal information
- Nationality: Bahamian
- Born: Everette Ferguson; 21 February 1952 Nassau, Bahamas
- Died: 28 June 2018 (aged 66)
- Height: 5 ft 11 in (180 cm)
- Weight: Light middleweight

Boxing career
- Reach: 72 in (183 cm)
- Stance: Orthodox

Boxing record
- Total fights: 120
- Wins: 91
- Win by KO: 60
- Losses: 22
- Draws: 4
- No contests: 3

Everette Oswald Ferguson BEM (21 February 1952 – 28 June 2018), better known as Elisha Obed was a Bahamian light middleweight boxer. He was the first Bahamian to win a world boxing title when he became the world light middleweight champion in 1975.

== Early life ==
Everette Oswald Ferguson was born in Acklins, Bahamas on 21 February 1952. He was the son of David Ferguson and Cetia Darling.

== Boxing career ==
=== Amateur career ===
Obed entered the amateur ranks at age 12. Fighting almost weekly, he ran up an undefeated record of 46-0 (16 knockouts). At the age of 14, he became a professional boxer.

=== Professional career ===
For almost 6 years, he lingered on small promotions on the island of Nassau, in the Bahamas. He was billed as undefeated, but he had lost a fight by knockout to veteran Kid Carew. His loss to Kid Carew was unlisted for almost 8 years, as he was reported incorrectly as undefeated in the press until his loss to Eckhard Dagge.

Veteran trainer and promoter Moe Fleischer travelled to Nassau to "check-out" this upcoming prospect. Mike Dundee, nephew of Angelo Dundee, came in as his manager.

Soon after, Obed was fighting main events. He earned a top ten ranking by knocking out former title contender Bunny Grant. Obed made his U.S. debut in Florida. Knocked out every top middleweight boxer in Florida in the early 1970s, including state Champion Dennis Riggs and former champion Jimmy Williams. On 1 June 1971, he won the Bahamian welterweight title, beating Ray Minus.

By January 1973, Obed had a professional record of 25-0 with 15 knockouts.

In 1975, he captured the WBC Light Middleweight Title by defeating Miguel de Oliveira. He defended the title twice before losing the belt to Germany's Eckhard Dagge in 1976, after which he quit, claiming he had blurred vision. Obed stated that he had been thumbed in the eye by a Dagge. In actuality, he was later found to have a detached retina and was legally blind in that eye.

Obed decided to enter the middleweight ranks. He later fought Australian Rocky Mattioli for the world championship title but was knocked out in the seventh round. By 27, he was back to where he started from, fighting on local fight cards in Nassau. He retired in 1988.

== Death ==
Obed died on Thursday, 28 June 2018 after a long illness. He was 66.

== Awards and honours ==
Obed was awarded the British Empire Medal Queen’s 2016 New Year’s Honours for services to sport.

Obed was into the National Sports Hall of Fame and also into the Florida Hall of Fame.

== Professional boxing record ==
120 fights	91 wins	22 losses
By knockout	60	9
By decision	31	12
By disqualification	0	1
Draws	4	
No contests	3	

No.	Result	Record	Opponent	Type	Round, time	Date	Location	Notes
120	Win	91–22–4 (3)	James Coakley	PTS	10 (10)	06/03/1988	Nassau, Bahamas	
119	Loss	90–22–4 (3)	James Coakley	PTS	10 (10)	21/03/1987	Nassau, Bahamas	
118	Loss	90–21–4 (3)	Arnold Neal	KO	4 (?)	02/02/1986	Nassau, Bahamas	
117	Loss	90–20–4 (3)	Earl Boger	TKO	8 (10)	22/01/1986	Sheraton Charleston Hotel, Charleston, South Carolina, U.S.	
116	Loss	90–19–4 (3)	Arnold Neal	KO	5 (?)	17/05/1985	Nassau, Bahamas	
115	Win	90–18–4 (3)	Rocky Fabrizio	PTS	10 (10)	28/09/1984	Nassau, Bahamas	
114	Loss	89–18–4 (3)	Jeff Nelson	TKO	8 (10)	18/06/1984	Nassau, Bahamas	
113	Win	89–17–4 (3)	Eddie Flanning	PTS	10 (10)	31/03/1984	Nassau, Bahamas	
112	Loss	88–17–4 (3)	Samuel Whyms	PTS	10 (10)	16/09/1983	Nassau, Bahamas	
111	Win	88–16–4 (3)	Allen Briscoe	KO	3 (?)	01/07/1983	Nassau, Bahamas	
110	Loss	87–16–4 (3)	Jeff Nelson	PTS	10 (10)	22/03/1983	Nassau, Bahamas	
109	Win	87–15–4 (3)	Lonnie Wilcox	KO	3 (?)	05/11/1982	Nassau, Bahamas	
108	Loss	86–15–4 (3)	Willie Ray Taylor	PTS	8 (8)	15/05/1982	Nassau, Bahamas	
107	Loss	86–14–4 (3)	Homer Jackson	PTS	10 (10)	16/02/1982	Nassau, Bahamas	
106	Loss	86–13–4 (3)	Bobby Czyz	DQ	6 (10)	12/11/1981	Meadowlands Arena, East Rutherford, New Jersey, U.S.	
105	Loss	86–12–4 (3)	Ralph Hollett	UD	10 (10)	25/08/1981	Halifax Metro Centre, Halifax, Nova Scotia, Canada	
104	Win	86–11–4 (3)	Edison Stubbs	KO	2 (?)	10/08/1981	Nassau, Bahamas	
103	Win	85–11–4 (3)	Sherwin Johnson	PTS	10 (10)	01/05/1981	Nassau, Bahamas	
102	Win	84–11–4 (3)	Homer Jackson	PTS	10 (10)	25/03/1981	Nassau, Bahamas	
101	Win	83–11–4 (3)	Eddie McNeeley	KO	4 (?)	14/03/1981	Freeport, Bahamas	
100	Win	82–11–4 (3)	Rocky Stevens	TKO	9 (10)	30/01/1981	Nassau, Bahamas	
99	Win	81–11–4 (3)	Sammy Masias	KO	5 (10)	07/10/1980	Nassau, Bahamas	
98	Loss	80–11–4 (3)	Steve Gregory	UD	10 (10)	24/07/1980	Downtown Sheraton Hotel Ballroom, Columbus, Ohio, U.S.	
97	Win	80–10–4 (3)	Apakuki Sakuru	PTS	10 (10)	30/05/1980	Suva, Fiji	
96	Loss	79–10–4 (3)	Fulgencio Obelmejias	TKO	3 (10)	03/03/1980	Caracas, Venezuela	
95	Win	79–9–4 (3)	Willie Featherstone	SD	10 (10)	12/02/1980	Paul Sauvé Arena, Montreal, Quebec, Canada	
94	Win	78–9–4 (3)	Sammy Barr	KO	4 (?)	26/12/1979	Nassau, Bahamas	
93	NC	77–9–4 (3)	Sammy Barr	NC	6 (?)	23/11/1979	Nassau, Bahamas	
92	Win	77–9–4 (2)	Richie Lee Roberts	PTS	10 (10)	19/10/1979	Freeport, Bahamas	
91	Loss	76–9–4 (2)	Curtis Parker	TKO	7 (10)	11/09/1979	Spectrum, Philadelphia, Pennsylvania, U.S.	
90	Win	76–8–4 (2)	Charlie Grimmett	KO	9 (10)	17/08/1979	Nassau, Bahamas	
89	Win	75–8–4 (2)	Hector Maldonado	KO	5 (?)	22/06/1979	Nassau, Bahamas	
88	Win	74–8–4 (2)	Terry Rondeau	KO	6 (10)	04/05/1979	Nassau Stadium, Nassau, Bahamas	
87	Win	73–8–4 (2)	Pablo Rodriguez	KO	5 (10)	21/04/1979	Freeport, Bahamas	
86	Win	72–8–4 (2)	Juan Serrano	PTS	10 (10)	30/03/1979	Nassau, Bahamas	
85	Win	71–8–4 (2)	Lionel Cameron	KO	4 (?)	23/02/1979	Nassau, Bahamas	
84	NC	70–8–4 (2)	A W Muhammad	NC	4 (?)	13/01/1979	Miami Beach Convention Center, Miami Beach, Florida, U.S.	
83	Loss	70–8–4 (1)	Tony Chiaverini	UD	10 (10)	02/12/1978	Municipal Auditorium, Kansas City, Missouri, U.S.	
82	Loss	70–7–4 (1)	Georg Steinherr	PTS	10 (10)	31/10/1978	Munich, West Germany	
81	Loss	70–6–4 (1)	Marijan Beneš	PTS	10 (10)	02/09/1978	Berlin, West Germany	
80	Win	70–5–4 (1)	Henry Tiger Hall	TKO	7 (?)	28/04/1978	Nassau Stadium, Nassau, Bahamas	
79	Loss	69–5–4 (1)	Rocky Mattioli	KO	7 (15)	11/03/1978	Kooyong Stadium, Melbourne, Australia	For WBC light middleweight title
78	Loss	69–4–4 (1)	Joao Mendonca	UD	10 (10)	02/12/1977	Ginásio do Ibirapuera, Sao Paulo, Brazil	
77	Win	69–3–4 (1)	Henry Mitchell	KO	3 (10)	23/10/1977	California Beach Club, Miami, Florida, U.S.	
76	Loss	68–3–4 (1)	Ayub Kalule	PTS	10 (10)	02/06/1977	Randers Hallen, Randers, Denmark	
75	Draw	68–2–4 (1)	Jean Claude LeClair	SD	10 (10)	22/02/1977	Paul Sauvé Arena, Montreal, Quebec, Canada	
74	Win	68–2–3 (1)	Fernand Marcotte	UD	10 (10)	18/01/1977	Forum, Montreal, Quebec, Canada	
73	Win	67–2–3 (1)	Sammy Barr	SD	10 (10)	19/11/1976	Nassau Stadium, Nassau, Bahamas	
72	Draw	66–2–3 (1)	Sammy Barr	PTS	10 (10)	24/09/1976	Nassau, Bahamas	
71	Win	66–2–2 (1)	Victor Taco Perez	UD	10 (10)	21/09/1976	Orlando Sports Stadium, Orlando, Florida, U.S.	
70	Win	65–2–2 (1)	Larry Brasier	KO	1 (10)	07/08/1976	Freeport, Bahamas	
69	Loss	64–2–2 (1)	Eckhard Dagge	TKO	10 (15)	18/06/1976	Deutschlandhalle, Charlottenburg, West Germany	Lost WBC light middleweight title
68	Win	64–1–2 (1)	Sea Robinson	UD	15 (15)	24/04/1976	Palais des Sports de Treichville, Abidjan, Ivory Coast	Retained WBC light middleweight title
67	Win	63–1–2 (1)	Tony Gardner	KO	2 (15)	28/02/1976	Queen Elizabeth Sports Centre, Nassau, Bahamas	Retained WBC light middleweight title
66	Win	62–1–2 (1)	Miguel de Oliveira	RTD	10 (15)	13/11/1975	Nouvelle Hippodrome, Paris, France	Won WBC light middleweight title
65	Win	61–1–2 (1)	Nick Peoples	KO	6 (10)	13/10/1975	Nassau Stadium, Nassau, Bahamas	
64	Win	60–1–2 (1)	Gene Wells	KO	5 (10)	22/07/1975	Miami Beach Convention Center, Miami Beach, Florida, U.S.	
63	Win	59–1–2 (1)	Chucho Garcia	TKO	5 (10)	20/06/1975	Freeport, Bahamas	
62	Win	58–1–2 (1)	Nat King	KO	8 (?)	30/05/1975	Nassau, Bahamas	
61	Win	57–1–2 (1)	Marcel Clay	KO	8 (10)	29/04/1975	Auditorium, Miami Beach, Florida, U.S.	
60	Win	56–1–2 (1)	Manuel Elizondo	KO	10 (10)	22/02/1975	Community Center, Tucson, Arizona, U.S.	
59	Win	55–1–2 (1)	Fernand Marcotte	TKO	11 (12)	21/01/1975	Auditorium, Miami Beach, Florida, U.S.	Won vacant NABF light middleweight title
58	Win	54–1–2 (1)	Sammy Rookard	UD	10 (10)	25/12/1974	Nassau, Bahamas	
57	Win	53–1–2 (1)	Renato Garcia	UD	10 (10)	16/11/1974	Community Center, Tucson, Arizona, U.S.	
56	Win	52–1–2 (1)	Johnny Rico	KO	2 (10)	19/10/1974	Community Center, Tucson, Arizona, U.S.	
55	Win	51–1–2 (1)	Bobby Williams	TKO	5 (10)	27/09/1974	Nassau, Bahamas	
54	Win	50–1–2 (1)	Guillermo Escalera	KO	5 (10)	06/09/1974	Freeport, Bahamas	
53	Win	49–1–2 (1)	Frank Flores	KO	5 (10)	16/08/1974	Community Center, Tucson, Arizona, U.S.	
52	Win	48–1–2 (1)	Carlos Marks	UD	10 (10)	11/07/1974	A.F. Adderley Auditorium, Nassau, Bahamas	
51	Draw	47–1–2 (1)	Dario Hidalgo	MD	10 (10)	11/06/1974	Auditorium, Miami Beach, Florida, U.S.	
50	Win	47–1–1 (1)	Chucho Garcia	PTS	10 (10)	31/05/1974	Freeport, Bahamas	
49	Win	46–1–1 (1)	Roy Lee	UD	10 (10)	26/04/1974	Nassau Stadium, Nassau, Bahamas	
48	Win	45–1–1 (1)	Jesse Rios	KO	2 (10)	09/04/1974	Auditorium, Miami Beach, Florida, U.S.	
47	Win	44–1–1 (1)	Eddie Davis	TKO	5 (10)	15/03/1974	Nassau Stadium, Nassau, Bahamas	
46	Win	43–1–1 (1)	Vicente Medina	TKO	7 (10)	26/02/1974	Auditorium, Miami Beach, Florida, U.S.	
45	Win	42–1–1 (1)	Windell Spencer	TKO	3 (10)	15/02/1974	Nassau Stadium, Nassau, Bahamas	
44	Win	41–1–1 (1)	Tom Von Hatten	TKO	2 (10)	15/01/1974	Auditorium, Miami Beach, Florida, U.S.	
43	Win	40–1–1 (1)	Saulo Hernandez	TKO	1 (10)	14/12/1973	Nassau Stadium, Nassau, Bahamas	
42	Win	39–1–1 (1)	Mike Lankester	RTD	7 (10)	04/12/1973	Auditorium, Miami Beach, Florida, U.S.	
41	Win	38–1–1 (1)	Dennis Riggs	KO	4 (10)	13/11/1973	Auditorium, Miami Beach, Florida, U.S.	
40	Win	37–1–1 (1)	Jose Papo Melendez	RTD	7 (10)	19/10/1973	Boca Raton Resort & Club, Boca Raton, Florida, U.S.	
39	Win	36–1–1 (1)	Bunny Grant	UD	10 (10)	28/09/1973	Nassau Stadium, Nassau, Bahamas	
38	Win	35–1–1 (1)	Doug Rogers	TKO	4 (10)	06/08/1973	A.F. Adderley Auditorium, Nassau, Bahamas	
37	Win	34–1–1 (1)	Jimmy Williams	KO	1 (10)	19/07/1973	Camelot Room, Freeport, Bahamas	
36	Win	33–1–1 (1)	Cliff Johnson	TKO	3 (10)	25/05/1973	Nassau Stadium, Nassau, Bahamas	
35	Win	32–1–1 (1)	Roy Goss	UD	10 (10)	23/04/1973	Nassau Stadium, Nassau, Bahamas	
34	Win	31–1–1 (1)	Al Cook	TKO	6 (10)	29/03/1973	Nassau Stadium, Nassau, Bahamas	
33	Win	30–1–1 (1)	Terry Hayward	KO	1 (10)	23/02/1973	Nassau Stadium, Nassau, Bahamas	
32	Win	29–1–1 (1)	Sandy Torres	KO	8 (10)	26/01/1973	Nassau Stadium, Nassau, Bahamas	
31	Win	28–1–1 (1)	Joe Hooks	KO	6 (10)	17/11/1972	Nassau, Bahamas	
30	Win	27–1–1 (1)	Prince Jimmy Hamm	KO	8 (10)	26/08/1972	Nassau, Bahamas	
29	Win	26–1–1 (1)	Roscoe Bell	PTS	10 (10)	15/07/1972	Nassau, Bahamas	
28	Win	25–1–1 (1)	Dorman Crawford	KO	10 (?)	26/05/1972	Nassau, Bahamas	
27	Win	24–1–1 (1)	Sugar Cliff	TKO	6 (12)	08/04/1972	Nassau, Bahamas	Won Bahamas Welterweight Title
26	Win	23–1–1 (1)	Larry Adkins	PTS	10 (10)	25/09/1971	Nassau, Bahamas	
25	Win	22–1–1 (1)	Ray Minus	UD	15 (15)	05/06/1971	Nassau, Bahamas	
24	Win	21–1–1 (1)	Carl Starling	KO	3 (10)	01/05/1971	Nassau, Bahamas	
23	Win	20–1–1 (1)	Don Fraser	KO	10 (10)	20/12/1970	Nassau, Bahamas	
22	Win	19–1–1 (1)	Buddy Taylor	PTS	10 (10)	27/11/1970	Nassau, Bahamas	
21	Win	18–1–1 (1)	Droopy Davis	TKO	7 (10)	29/08/1970	Nassau, Bahamas	
20	Win	17–1–1 (1)	Bert Woods	KO	3 (?)	15/05/1970	Nassau, Bahamas	
19	Win	16–1–1 (1)	Milton Hall	KO	2 (?)	03/04/1970	Nassau, Bahamas	
18	Win	15–1–1 (1)	Don Fraser	PTS	8 (8)	08/12/1969	Nassau, Bahamas	
17	Win	14–1–1 (1)	Sandy Ronnie Jeffries	PTS	8 (8)	31/10/1969	Nassau, Bahamas	
16	Win	13–1–1 (1)	Winston Green	PTS	8 (8)	26/09/1969	Nassau, Bahamas	
15	Win	12–1–1 (1)	Sugarboy Monroe	KO	1 (?)	15/08/1969	Nassau, Bahamas	
14	Win	11–1–1 (1)	Droopy Davis	PTS	8 (8)	11/07/1969	Nassau, Bahamas	
13	Win	10–1–1 (1)	Kid Joe	KO	6 (?)	14/03/1969	Nassau, Bahamas	
12	Win	9–1–1 (1)	Cornbread Rhamina	KO	5 (?)	21/02/1969	Nassau, Bahamas	
11	Win	8–1–1 (1)	Roscoe Russell	KO	2 (?)	07/02/1969	Nassau, Bahamas	
10	Win	7–1–1 (1)	Mike Whymms	KO	1 (?)	20/01/1969	Nassau, Bahamas	
9	Win	6–1–1 (1)	Taylor Ventura	KO	2 (?)	02/12/1968	Nassau, Bahamas	
8	Win	5–1–1 (1)	Mike Whymms	KO	3 (?)	22/11/1968	Nassau, Bahamas	
7	Win	4–1–1 (1)	Freddie Major	PTS	4 (4)	10/08/1968	Nassau, Bahamas	
6	Win	3–1–1 (1)	Tony Mortimer	PTS	4 (4)	16/02/1968	Nassau, Bahamas	
5	Loss	2–1–1 (1)	Kid Carew	KO	2 (?)	11/12/1967	Nassau, Bahamas	
4	Draw	2–0–1 (1)	Taylor Ventura	PTS	4 (4)	10/11/1967	Nassau, Bahamas	
3	NC	2–0 (1)	Pino Romano	NC	3 (4)	13/10/1967	Nassau, Bahamas	
2	Win	2–0	Taylor Ventura	KO	1 (?)	15/09/1967	Nassau, Bahamas	
1	Win	1–0	Edison Stubbs	PTS	4 (4)	10/08/1967	Nassau, Bahamas	

== See also ==
- List of world light-middleweight boxing champions
- Ray Minus

Sporting positions
Regional boxing titles
Vacant Title last held by Ralph Palladin	NABF super welterweight champion January 21, 1975 – 1975; Vacated	Vacant Title next held by Mike Baker
World boxing titles
Preceded by Miguel de Oliveira	WBC super welterweight champion November 13, 1975 – June 18, 1976	Succeeded by Eckhard Dagge
