= George Francis =

George Francis may refer to:

- George Grant Francis (1814–1882), Welsh antiquary
- George Francis (cricketer) (1897–1942), West Indian cricketer
- George Francis (footballer) (1934–2014), English football (soccer) player
- George Francis (rugby union) (born 1998), Australian rugby union player
- George Francis (Robot Wars), chief engineer of the "Chaos 2" team from the BBC television series Robot Wars
- George Francis (suspected criminal) (1940–2003), British man suspected of involvement in the 1983 Brink's-Mat robbery
- George Francis (trainer) (c. 1929–2002), British boxing trainer
- George B. Francis (1883–1967), U.S. Representative from New York
- George William Francis (1800–1865), English botanical and general science writer
