= Bunny Sterling =

Jamaican boxer

Personal information
- Nationality: British
- Born: Basil Sylvester Sterling; 4 April 1948 Jamaica
- Died: 19 November 2018 (aged 70)
- Weight: Middleweight

Boxing career

Boxing record
- Total fights: 57
- Wins: 35
- Win by KO: 14
- Losses: 18
- Draws: 4

Basil Sylvester Sterling (4 April 1948 - 19 November 2018), known as Bunny Sterling, was a Jamaican-born British boxer, who in 1970 became the first Caribbean immigrant to win a British title when he won the middleweight belt. He went on to become European middleweight champion in 1976.

== Career ==
Born Basil Sylvester Sterling in Jamaica, he moved with his parents to live in London at the age of six. Managed by George Francis, he made his professional debut in September 1966, losing on points to Joe Devitt. After also losing his next two fights, he gained his first win in December, with a points decision over Fess Parker.

In May 1968, he unsuccessfully challenged for Johnny Kramer's Southern Area middleweight title, losing narrowly on points. The two fought again for the title in December, this time Sterling taking the win after a cut to Kramer led to the fight being stopped. In his next four fights, he lost three (to former British champion Wally Swift, Harry Scott, and Dick Duffy) and drew one (with Nessim Max Cohen), but in January and May 1970 respectively, beat Dennis Pleace and Scott in eliminators to get a shot at the British middleweight title. At this time he was studying Law as well as pursuing a boxing career.

He won the British and Commonwealth middleweight titles on 8 September 1970 at Wembley Stadium in London, stopping Mark Rowe at the end of the fourth round due to a cut. Although he had been allowed to compete for the British title based on his residency, he didn't become a British citizen until 20 October 1970, which also gave him eligibility to fight for the European title. He successfully defended his Commonwealth title in November 1970 against Kahu Mahanga.

Later in 1970, Sterling was charged with using threatening behaviour and driving offences. After his original court hearing was adjourned after he arrived late, he was allowed to travel to Australia in January 1971 to defend his Commonwealth title against Tony Mundine, the fight ending in a draw. After failing to attend court for the reconvened hearing, a warrant was issued for his arrest in February 1971. When he was eventually tried in April that year, he pleaded guilty and was fined £38 with £50 costs.

He made a third defence of the Commonwealth title in March 1971, taking a unanimous decision against Johan Louw in Edmonton. Wins over Billy Douglas, former world welterweight champion Luis Manuel Rodríguez, and former European champion Tom Bogs followed, before he got his first shot at the European title in December, challenging defending champion Jean-Claude Bouttier. Bouttier knocked him out in the fourteenth round to retain the title.

Sterling lost the Commonwealth title in April 1972, Tony Mundine stopping him in the fifteenth and final round in Brisbane. Sterling made successful defences of his British title against Phil Matthews in September 1972, Don McMillan in January 1973, and Rowe in April 1973, to win the Lonsdale Belt outright. With the European title becoming vacant, Sterling got a second shot at it in November 1973 against Elio Calcabrini in San Remo. The Italian took the title on points.

Sterling lost the British title in his fourth defence, Kevin Finnegan taking a points decision in February 1974. When Finnegan vacated, he took the chance to win it back, stopping reigning light-middleweight champion Maurice Hope in the eighth round in June 1975. He vacated the title to once again challenge for the European title.

In February 1976, he stopped Frank Reiche in the thirteenth round at the Sporthalle, Alsterdorf to become European champion. He made one defence of the title, losing a unanimous decision to Angelo Jacopucci in Milan four months later.

Sterling had three further fights, his last a points defeat to Mustafa Wasajja in November 1977, before retiring in 1978.
