= Vito Antuofermo =

Italian boxer (born 1953)

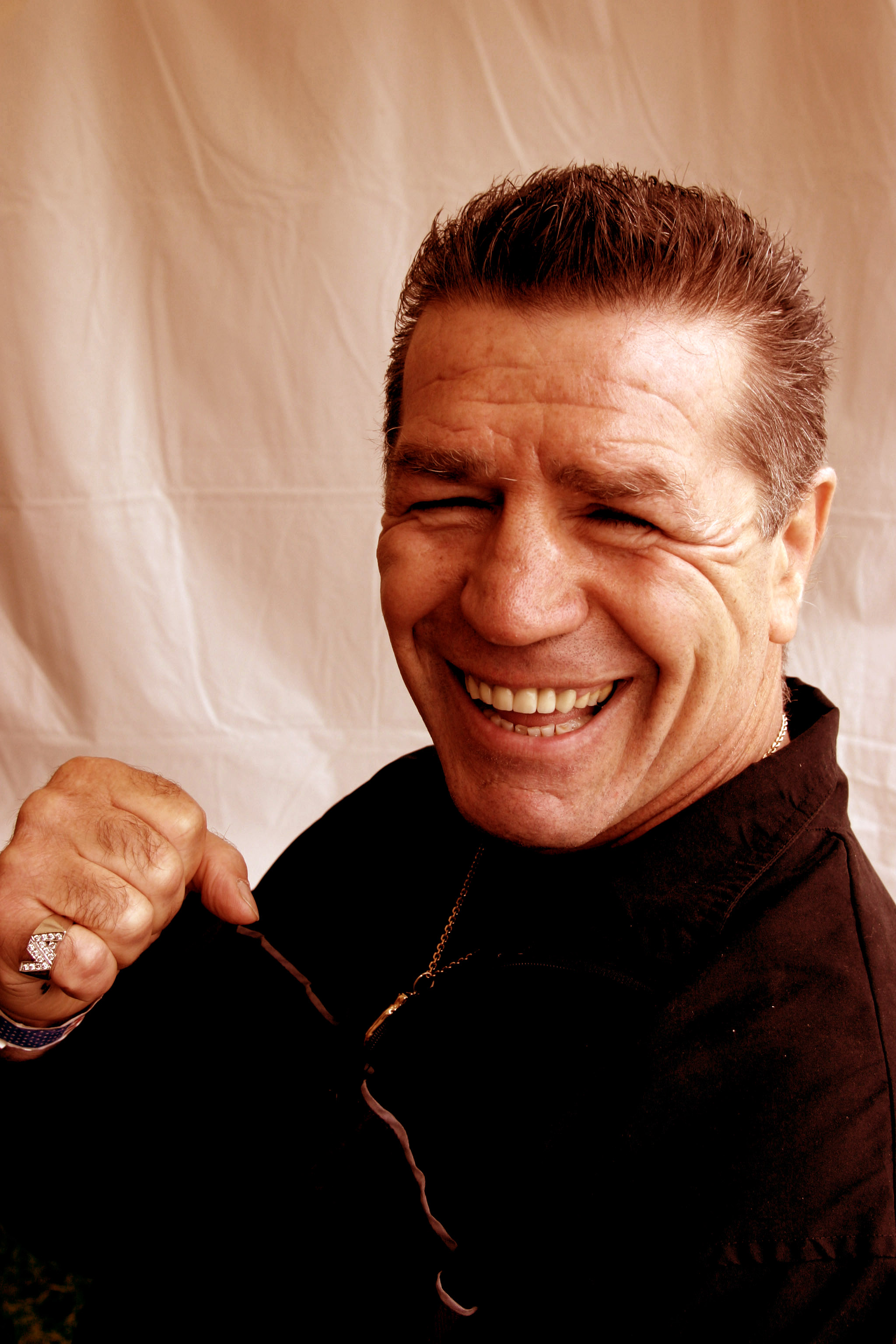
- Antuofermo in 2006

Personal information
- Nationality: Italian; American
- Born: Vito Gabriele Antuofermo; February 9, 1953 (age 73) Palo del Colle, Italy
- Height: 5 ft 7 1/2 in (171 cm)
- Weight: Light middleweight; Middleweight

Boxing career
- Reach: 69 in (175 cm)
- Stance: Orthodox

Boxing record
- Total fights: 59
- Wins: 50
- Win by KO: 21
- Losses: 7
- Draws: 2

Vito Antuofermo (Italian pronunciation: [ˈviːto antwoˈfermo]; born February 9, 1953) is an Italian American actor and retired professional boxer. He competed from 1971 to 1985 and held the undisputed world middleweight championship from 1979 to 1980, winning the WBA, WBC and The Ring titles by defeating Hugo Corro in Monte Carlo.

== Background ==
Antuofermo was born in Italy, in the town of Palo del Colle, about 15 km (9 miles) inland from the city of Bari. His family moved to the United States when he was 17 years old. Antuofermo learned how to fight in the tough areas of New York City. By his teens, he had made up his mind that he wanted to be a professional boxer.

He has lived in Howard Beach, Queens.

== Amateur career ==
Antuofermo won the 1970 147-pound (67 kg) New York Golden Gloves Championship, defeating Thomas Chestnut in the finals. In 1971, Antuofermo was defeated by future Light Heavyweight Champion Eddie Gregory in the finals of the 147-pound (67 kg) Open division. Antuofermo trained at the Police Athletic Leagues Sweeney Center in Brooklyn, New York.

== Professional career ==
Antuofermo had a propensity to cut easily, especially around the eyebrows. In between rounds in his fights, as much attention (if not more) was given to Vito patching up cuts on his face as it was giving him advice and instructions.

In 1979, Antuofermo became World Middleweight Champion by beating defending champion Hugo Corro by a decision in 15 rounds at Monte Carlo. According to an article in The Ring, Howard Cosell, who was working on that fight's live broadcast to the US, was telling viewers that Corro was, in his opinion, way ahead on the judges' cards. When someone on the American television crew found out it was Antuofermo who was actually leading on the cards, Cosell then began to say he had Antuofermo ahead. All three judges' scorecards were very close, each showing a tight, one-point margin: 143–142, 146–145 in Antuofermo's favor, and 146–145 in Corro's favor.

On the morning after winning the title, Antuofermo and his crew were driving to a small vacation in Italy, when he saw a car fly off a bridge under which they were passing. The car landed right in front of him, but luckily the accident did not injure any occupants in Antuofermo's car. He was so shocked that he kept driving and never found out what happened to the occupants of that car. He came back to his senses about 20 minutes later.

On November 30, 1979, Antuofermo defended his title against Marvelous Marvin Hagler in Las Vegas, Nevada, the fight resulting in a controversial 15-round draw. Judge Duane Ford scored the bout in Hagler's favor, 145–141. Judge Dalby Shirley scored it for Antuofermo, 144–142. Judge Hal Miller had it even at 143–143. The draw enabled Antuofermo to retain his title. In his next defense, against Alan Minter, also in Las Vegas, he lost the title by a 15-round split decision. The bout featured a wild disparity in scoring with a Venezuelan judge scoring the fight for Antuofermo while a British judge had Minter winning 13 of the 15 rounds. They had a rematch in London on June 28, 1980. Minter retained the crown by a TKO (on cuts) in eight rounds.

Antuofermo kept fighting and winning and, after Hagler won the title from Minter in 1980, Antuofermo was given another chance to regain the World Middleweight Championship. In front of an HBO Boxing audience and a full house at Hagler's native Boston's Boston Garden, Antuofermo this time lost by a TKO on cuts in the fourth round.

After several attempts at becoming a top middleweight again, Antuofermo retired from boxing in 1985.

Apart from Corro, other boxers he beat included world champions Eckhard Dagge, Denny Moyer and Emile Griffith.

In 1992, Michael Franzese, a caporegime of the Colombo crime family, testified that Antoufermo had been under the control of mobsters including Andy Russo. Franzese stated that the outcome of many of Antuofermo's fights was pre-determined so that organized crime figures could safely bet. Antuofermo said that he knew nothing of this..

== Life after boxing ==
After retirement, Antuofermo began to pursue an acting career. In 1990, he landed a small role in The Godfather Part III as the chief bodyguard of gangster Joey Zasa. He has landed several small speaking roles in movies and television shows since, including the critically acclaimed television show The Sopranos as a mobster. He has also done many theater plays.

Antuofermo also made television commercials for Old Spice deodorant.

Antuofermo's record reads 50 wins, 7 losses and 2 draws, with 21 wins by knockout. Vito Antuofermo's second oldest son, Pasquale Antuofermo, boxed as an amateur, but never turned pro. He now owns a successful landscaping company that operates in Long Island, New York.

== Filmography ==
- 1990: Goodfellas – Prizefighter
- 1990: The Godfather Part III – Anthony 'The Ant' Squigliaro
- 1991: Loser – Homeless Man
- 1993: New York Undercover – Jimmy
- 1996: The Mouse – Trainer
- 1998: Hell's Kitchen – Boyle's Thug
- 1999: La bomba – Pippo Messina
- 2000: The Boys Behind the Desk

== Professional boxing record ==
59 fights	50 wins	7 losses
By knockout	21	5
By decision	29	2
Draws	2	

No.	Result	Record	Opponent	Type	Round, time	Date	Location	Notes
59	Loss	50–7–2	Matthew Hilton	RTD	4 (10), 3:00	Oct 20, 1985	Montreal Forum, Montreal, Quebec, Canada	
58	Win	50–6–2	Larry McCall	UD	10	May 25, 1985	Washington Convention Center, Washington, D.C., U.S.	
57	Win	49–6–2	Mark Allman	TKO	3 (10), 1:24	Mar 8, 1985	Ridgewood Grove, New York City, New York, U.S.	
56	Win	48–6–2	Marcus Starks	TKO	4 (10), 1:46	Dec 14, 1984	Nassau Coliseum, Uniondale, New York, U.S.	
55	Win	47–6–2	Ricard Beranek	TD	5 (10)	Sep 13, 1984	Resorts International, Atlantic City, New Jersey, U.S.	
54	Loss	46–6–2	Marvin Hagler	RTD	4 (15)	Jun 13, 1981	Boston Garden, Boston, Massachusetts, U.S.	For WBA, WBC, and The Ring middleweight titles
53	Win	46–5–2	Mauricio Aldana	UD	10	Apr 2, 1981	Conrad Hilton Hotel, Chicago, Illinois, U.S.	
52	Loss	45–5–2	Alan Minter	TKO	8 (15)	Jun 28, 1980	Empire Pool, London, England	For WBA, WBC, and The Ring middleweight titles
51	Loss	45–4–2	Alan Minter	SD	15	Mar 16, 1980	Caesars Palace, Paradise, Nevada, U.S.	Lost WBA, WBC, and The Ring middleweight titles
50	Draw	45–3–2	Marvin Hagler	SD	15	Nov 30, 1979	Caesars Palace, Paradise, Nevada, U.S.	Retained WBA, WBC, and The Ring middleweight titles
49	Win	45–3–1	Hugo Corro	SD	15	Jun 30, 1979	Esplanade de Fontvieille, Fontvieille, Monaco	Won WBA, WBC, and The Ring middleweight titles
48	Win	44–3–1	Mike Hallacy	UD	10	Nov 11, 1978	Boston Garden, Boston, Massachusetts, U.S.	
47	Win	43–3–1	Willie Classen	UD	10	Aug 25, 1978	Madison Square Garden, New York City, New York, U.S.	
46	Win	42–3–1	Willie Warren	UD	10	Jun 22, 1978	Madison Square Garden, New York City, New York, U.S.	
45	Win	41–3–1	Bennie Briscoe	UD	10	Feb 4, 1978	Madison Square Garden, New York City, New York, U.S.	
44	Win	40–3–1	Mike Nixon	TKO	4 (10), 2:58	Oct 27, 1977	Madison Square Garden, New York City, New York, U.S.	
43	Win	39–3–1	Ramon Beras	KO	6 (10), 1:16	Aug 30, 1977	Montreal Forum, Montreal, Quebec, Canada	
42	Win	38–3–1	Eugene Hart	KO	5 (10)	Mar 11, 1977	Philadelphia Arena, Philadelphia, Pennsylvania, U.S.	
41	Win	37–3–1	Pablo Rodriguez	KO	4 (10)	Dec 2, 1976	Sunnyside Gardens, New York City, New York, U.S.	
40	Loss	36–3–1	Maurice Hope	TKO	15 (15), 2:48	Oct 1, 1976	Palazzetto dello Sport, Rome, Lazio, Italy	Lost European super-welterweight title
39	Loss	36–2–1	Frank Wissenbach	PTS	8	Jun 18, 1976	Deutschlandhalle, Berlin, Germany	
38	Win	36–1–1	Jean-Claude Warusfel	TKO	14 (15)	Mar 26, 1976	Palasport di San Siro, Milan, Lombardy, Italy	Retained European super-welterweight title
37	Win	35–1–1	Eckhard Dagge	PTS	15	Jan 16, 1976	Deutschlandhalle, Berlin, Germany	Won European super-welterweight title
36	Win	34–1–1	Bruce Cantrell	PTS	10	Nov 28, 1975	Long Island Arena, Commack, New York, U.S.	
35	Win	33–1–1	Ricky Ortiz	TKO	6 (10)	Oct 23, 1975	Broome County Arena, Binghamton, New York, U.S.	
34	Win	32–1–1	Vinnie Curto	UD	10	Aug 8, 1975	Tropicana Hotel & Casino, Las Vegas, Nevada, U.S.	
33	Win	31–1–1	Antonio Castellini	TKO	5 (10)	Jun 27, 1975	Palazzetto dello Sport, Naples, Campania, Italy	
32	Win	30–1–1	Reinaldo Oliveira Jr.	TKO	6 (10)	Jun 6, 1975	Palazzetto dello Sport, Naples, Campania, Italy	
31	Win	29–1–1	Dave Huckaby	UD	10	Mar 20, 1975	Bristol Arena, Bristol, Connecticut, U.S.	
30	Win	28–1–1	Ramón Mendez	PTS	10	Jan 24, 1975	PalaLido, Milan, Lombardy, Italy	
29	Win	27–1–1	Emile Griffith	UD	10	Nov 22, 1974	Madison Square Garden, New York City, New York, U.S.	
28	Win	26–1–1	Paul Osborne	TKO	3 (10)	Oct 18, 1974	Steelworkers Hall, Baltimore, Maryland, U.S.	
27	Win	25–1–1	Denny Moyer	UD	10	Sep 9, 1974	Madison Square Garden, New York City, New York, U.S.	
26	Win	24–1–1	Melvin Dennis	PTS	10	Jun 7, 1974	Palazzetto dello Sport, Rome, Lazio, Italy	
25	Win	23–1–1	Joey Durelle	KO	1 (10)	May 3, 1974	Palazzetto dello Sport, Rome, Lazio, Italy	
24	Win	22–1–1	John L. Sullivan	UD	10	Mar 8, 1974	Madison Square Garden, New York City, New York, U.S.	
23	Win	21–1–1	Chucho García	UD	10	Jan 14, 1974	Felt Forum, New York City, New York, U.S.	
22	Win	20–1–1	Buddy Boggs	TKO	6 (10)	Dec 5, 1973	Baltimore Civic Center, Baltimore, Maryland, U.S.	
21	Win	19–1–1	Tony Kid Durango	UD	10	Oct 8, 1973	Felt Forum, New York City, New York, U.S.	
20	Win	18–1–1	Danny McAloon	UD	10	Aug 25, 1973	Felt Forum, New York City, New York, U.S.	
19	Loss	17–1–1	Harold Weston	TKO	5 (10), 2:53	Jul 9, 1973	Felt Forum, New York City, New York, U.S.	
18	Win	17–0–1	Tony Kid Durango	TKO	2 (10)	Jun 18, 1973	Madison Square Garden, New York City, New York, U.S.	
17	Win	16–0–1	Art Kettles	SD	10	Apr 30, 1973	Felt Forum, New York City, New York, U.S.	
16	Win	15–0–1	Luis Rivera	PTS	8	Apr 13, 1973	Sunnyside Gardens, New York City, New York, U.S.	
15	Win	14–0–1	Ray Villanueva	TKO	4 (10)	Mar 9, 1973	Madison Square Garden, New York City, New York, U.S.	
14	Win	13–0–1	Skip Yeaton	KO	2 (10)	Jan 31, 1973	Sunnyside Gardens, New York City, New York, U.S.	
13	Win	12–0–1	Al Sewell	KO	7 (8)	Dec 15, 1972	Sunnyside Gardens, New York City, New York, U.S.	
12	Win	11–0–1	Carlos Novotny	KO	3 (8)	Nov 22, 1972	Sunnyside Gardens, New York City, New York, U.S.	
11	Win	10–0–1	Oreste Lebron	PTS	8	Oct 10, 1972	Sunnyside Gardens, New York City, New York, U.S.	
10	Win	9–0–1	Charles Hayward	PTS	6	Sep 11, 1972	Gaelic Park, New York City, New York, U.S.	
9	Win	8–0–1	Gabe Bowens	PTS	4	Aug 28, 1972	Madison Square Garden, New York City, New York, U.S.	
8	Win	7–0–1	Jerry Caballero	TKO	4 (6)	Jul 21, 1972	Singer Bowl, New York City, New York, U.S.	
7	Win	6–0–1	Don Sauls	PTS	6	Jun 30, 1972	Sunnyside Gardens, New York City, New York, U.S.	
6	Win	5–0–1	Lenny Carter	KO	2 (?)	May 26, 1972	Sunnyside Gardens, New York City, New York, U.S.	
5	Win	4–0–1	John Presley	KO	1 (?)	Apr 11, 1972	Sunnyside Gardens, New York City, New York, U.S.	
4	Win	3–0–1	Ivelaw Eastman	PTS	4	Mar 1, 1972	Sunnyside Gardens, New York City, New York, U.S.	
3	Draw	2–0–1	Charles Hayward	PTS	6	Feb 17, 1972	Embassy Hall, North Bergen, New Jersey, U.S.	
2	Win	2–0	Juan Rivera	PTS	6	Jan 17, 1972	Westchester County Center, White Plains, New York, U.S.	
1	Win	1–0	Ivelaw Eastman	PTS	4	Nov 30, 1971	Sunnyside Gardens, New York City, New York, U.S.	

== Titles in boxing ==
=== Major world titles ===
- WBA middleweight champion (160 lbs)
- WBC middleweight champion (160 lbs)

=== The Ring magazine titles ===
- The Ring middleweight champion (160 lbs)

=== Regional/International titles ===
- European light middleweight champion (154 lbs)

=== Undisputed titles ===
- Undisputed middleweight champion

== See also ==
- List of world middleweight boxing champions

Sporting positions
Regional boxing titles
Preceded by Eckhard Dagge	European super welterweight champion January 16, 1976 – October 1, 1976	Succeeded by Maurice Hope
World boxing titles
Preceded by Hugo Corro	WBA middleweight champion June 30, 1979 – March 16, 1980	Succeeded by Alan Minter
Preceded by Hugo Corro	WBC middleweight champion June 30, 1979 – March 16, 1980	Succeeded by Alan Minter
Preceded by Hugo Corro	The Ring middleweight champion June 30, 1979 – March 16, 1980	Succeeded by Alan Minter
Preceded by Hugo Corro	Undisputed middleweight champion June 30, 1979 – March 16, 1980	Succeeded by Alan Minter
