= Ripa Teatina =

- Comune
- Comune di Ripa Teatina
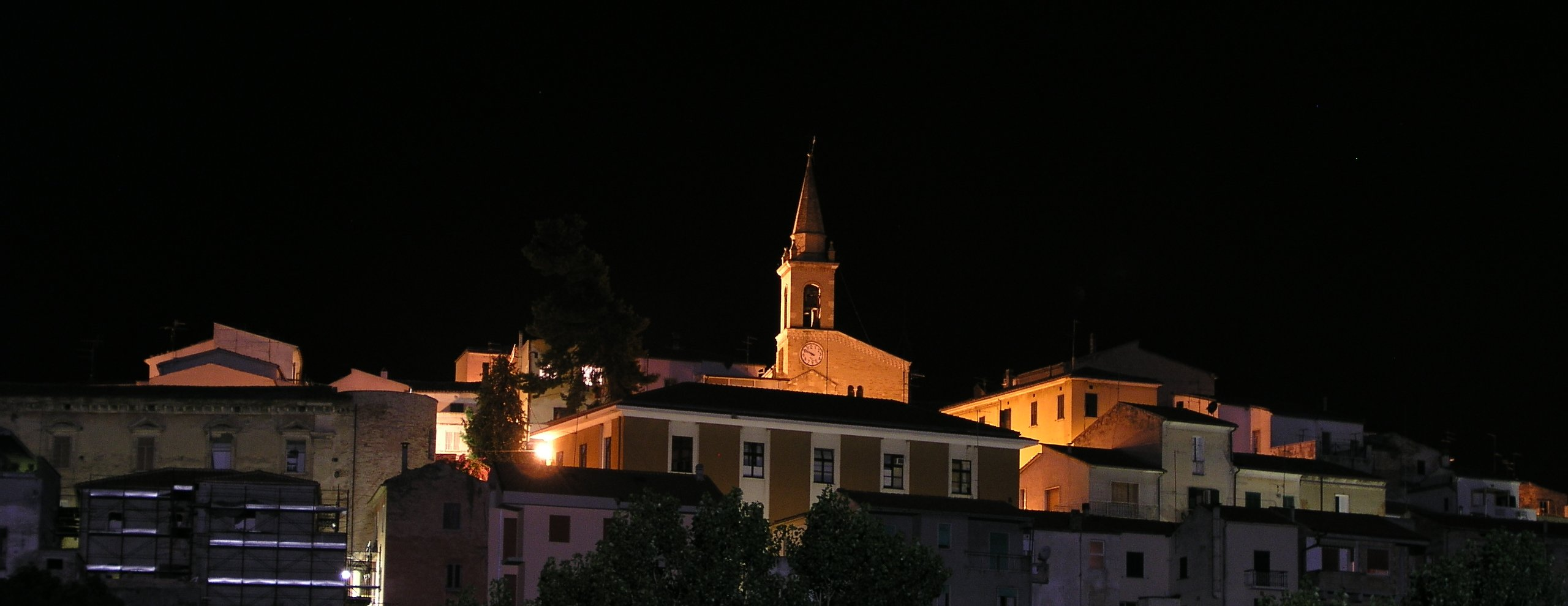

- Coat of arms

- Location within Italy Location within Abruzzo
- Coordinates: 42°21′N 14°14′E
- Country: Italy
- Region: Abruzzo
- Province: Chieti (CH)
- Frazioni: Alento Salvatore, Arenile, Arenile Foro, Casale, Casale Alento, Feudo, Mangifesta, Tiboni

Government
  - Mayor: Ignazio Rucci

Area
  - Total: 20 km^{2} (7.7 sq mi)
- Elevation: 199 m (653 ft)

Population (31 December 2017)
  - Total: 4,083
  - Density: 200/km^{2} (530/sq mi)
- Demonym: Ripesi or Riparoli
- Time zone: UTC+1 (CET)
  - Summer (DST): UTC+2 (CEST)
- Postal code: 66010
- Dialing code: 0871
- Patron saint: Maria SS. del Sudore
- Saint day: 22 March
- Website: Official website

Ripa Teatina (Abruzzese: La Rìpe) is a comune and town in the province of Chieti, in the Italian region Abruzzo. Ripa Teatina is renowned for its vineyards and olive groves which surround and embrace this tranquil part of Abruzzo.

== People ==
- The father of boxing World Champion Rocky Marciano, Pierino Marchegiano, immigrated to the United States from Ripa Teatina in 1912.
- Rocky Mattioli is another boxer from Ripa Teatina, born in 1953.

== Twin towns ==
- (United States) Brockton, Massachusetts, USA
- Sequals, Italy
- San Bartolomeo in Galdo, Italy
- Ribeirão Preto, Brazil
