= Emile Griffith =

American boxer (1938–2013)

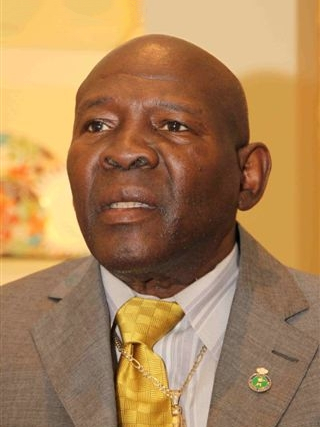
- Griffith in 2010

Personal information
- Born: Emile Alphonse Griffith; February 3, 1938 Saint Thomas, U.S. Virgin Islands
- Died: July 23, 2013 (aged 75) Hempstead, New York, U.S.
- Height: 5 ft 6.5 in (169 cm)

Boxing career
- Weight class: Welterweight; Light middleweight Middleweight
- Reach: 72 in (183 cm)
- Stance: Orthodox

Boxing record
- Total fights: 112
- Wins: 85
- Win by KO: 23
- Losses: 24
- Draws: 2
- No contests: 1

Emile Alphonse Griffith (February 3, 1938 – July 23, 2013) was an American professional boxer who won world titles in three weight divisions. He held the world light middleweight, undisputed welterweight, and middleweight titles. His best-known contest was a 1962 title match with Benny Paret. Griffith won the bout by knockout; Paret never recovered consciousness and died in the hospital 10 days later.

In 1963 and 1964, Griffith was voted Fighter of the Year by The Ring magazine and the Boxing Writers Association of America. In 2002, he was listed #33 on Ring Magazine's list of 80 greatest fighters of the past 80 years. Griffith currently ranks #127 in BoxRec's ranking of the greatest pound for pound boxers of all time. He was inducted into the International Boxing Hall of Fame in the inaugural class of 1990.

== Career ==
=== Amateur ===
Griffith was born on February 3, 1938. As a teen he was working at a hat factory on a steamy day when his boss, the factory owner, agreed to Griffith's request to work shirtless. When the owner, a former amateur boxer, noticed his frame, he took Griffith to trainer Gil Clancy's gym.

Griffith won the 1958 New York Golden Gloves 147 lb Open Championship, defeating Osvaldo Marcano of the Police Athletic Leagues Lynch Center in the final. In 1957 Griffith advanced to the finals of the 147-lb Sub-Novice division and was defeated by Charles Wormley of the Salem Crescent Athletic Club. Griffith trained at the West 28th Street Parks Department Gym in New York City.

=== Professional ===
Griffith turned professional in 1958 and fought frequently in New York City. He captured the Welterweight title from Cuban Benny "The Kid" Paret by knocking him out in the 13th round on April 1, 1961. Six months later, Griffith lost the title to Paret in a narrow split decision. Griffith regained the title from Paret on March 24, 1962, in the controversial bout after which Paret died (see below).

Griffith waged a classic four-fight series with Luis Rodríguez, losing their second fight and winning the other three. He defeated middleweight contender Holley Mims but was knocked out in one round by Rubin "Hurricane" Carter. Three years later, on April 25, 1966, he faced middleweight champion Dick Tiger and won a 15-round unanimous decision and the middleweight title. He also lost, regained and then lost the middleweight crown in three classic fights with Nino Benvenuti.

But many boxing fans believed he was never quite the same fighter after Paret's death. From the Paret bout to his retirement in 1977, Griffith fought 80 bouts but only scored twelve knockouts. He later admitted to being gentler with his opponents and relying on his superior boxing skills because he was terrified of killing someone else in the ring. Many thought that Griffith fought past his prime, only winning nine of his last twenty three fights. Other boxers whom he fought in his career included world champions American Denny Moyer, Cuban Luis Rodríguez, Argentine Carlos Monzón, Cuban José Nápoles, and in his last title try, German Eckhard Dagge. After 18 years as a professional boxer, Griffith retired with a record of 85 wins (25 by knockout), 24 losses and 2 draws.

==== Benny Paret ====
Griffith and Paret's third fight, which was nationally televised by ABC, occurred on March 24, 1962, at Madison Square Garden. Griffith had been incensed by an anti-gay slur directed at him by Paret during the weigh-in. Paret touched Griffith's buttocks and whispered into his opponent's ear "maricón, maricón", Spanish slang for "faggot". Griffith had to be restrained from attacking Paret on the spot. The media at the time either ignored the slur or used euphemisms such as "anti-man". Griffith's girlfriend asked him about the incident, saying, "I didn't know about you being that way."

In the sixth round Paret came close to stopping Griffith with a multi-punch combination, but Griffith was saved by the bell. After the sixth round Griffith's trainer, Gil Clancy, later said he told him, "When you go inside I want you to keep punching until Paret holds you or the referee breaks you! But you keep punching until he does that!".

Griffith told a television interviewer: "I'm very proud to be the welterweight champion again. I hope Paret is feeling very good." When the seriousness of the situation become known, Griffith went to the hospital where Paret was being treated and unsuccessfully attempted for several hours to gain entry to Paret's room. Following that, he ran through the streets while being insulted by passersby. He would later receive hate mail from Paret supporters who were convinced Griffith intentionally killed Paret.

New York Governor Nelson Rockefeller created a seven-man commission to investigate the incident and the sport. Griffith reportedly felt guilt over Paret's death and suffered nightmares about Paret for 40 years.

The fight, and the widespread publicity and criticism of boxing which accompanied it, became the basis of the 2005 documentary Ring of Fire: The Emile Griffith Story.

=== Trainer ===
Griffith trained other boxers, including Wilfred Benítez and Juan Laporte of Puerto Rico. Both won world championships. Griffith is a member of the International Boxing Hall of Fame. In 1979–80, he was in Denmark serving as the coach of the Danish Olympic boxing team.

== Personal life ==
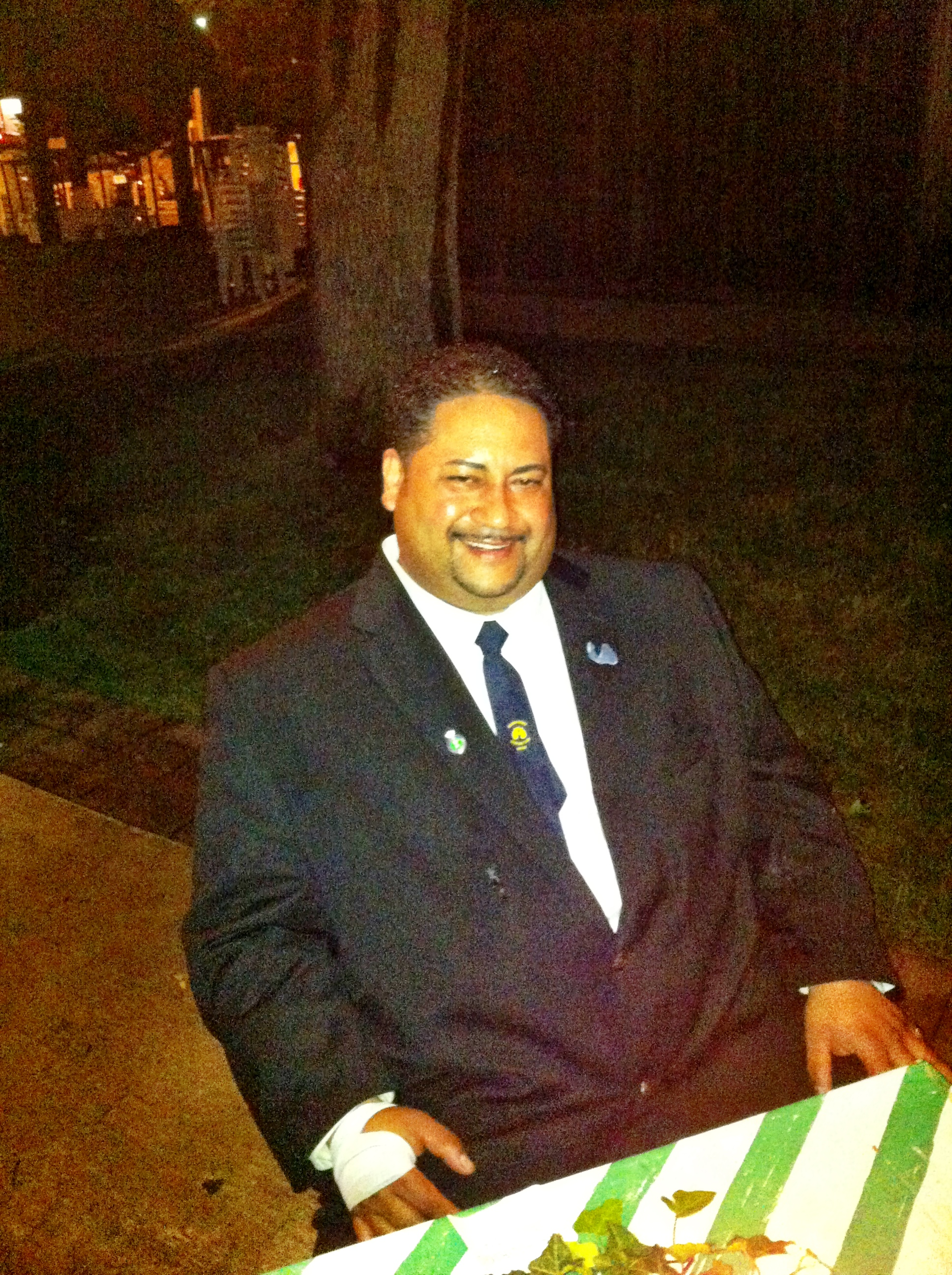
Luis Rodrigo Griffith, Emile's adopted son and caretaker, at the after party of the world premiere of Terence Blanchard's opera Champion on June 15, 2013.

In 1971, two months after they met, Griffith married another Virgin Islander, Mercedes "Sadie" Donastorg, who was then a member of the dance troupe "Prince Rupert and the Slave Girls". Griffith adopted Donastorg's daughter, but the marriage only lasted a few months. After retiring from boxing, Griffith worked as a corrections officer at the Secaucus, New Jersey Juvenile Detention Facility.

In 1992, Griffith was viciously beaten and almost killed on a New York City street after leaving a gay bar near the Port Authority Bus Terminal. He was in the hospital for four months after the assault. It was not clear if the violence was motivated by homophobia.

Griffith was bisexual. He was quoted in Sports Illustrated as saying "I like men and women both. But I don't like that word: homosexual, gay or faggot. I don't know what I am. I love men and women the same, but if you ask me which is better ... I like women."

=== Death ===
A long-time resident of Weehawken, New Jersey, Griffith died July 23, 2013, at a care facility in Hempstead, New York. In his final years, he suffered from dementia pugilistica and required full-time care. His lover, whom he had adopted as a son, Luis Rodrigo Griffith, was his primary caregiver. He was buried in St. Michael's Cemetery, Queens, New York City.

== Media representations ==
- Griffith's December 20, 1963 bout with Rubin Carter (which Griffith lost) is depicted in the opening scene of the 1999 motion picture The Hurricane. Griffith is portrayed by former boxer Terry Claybon, while actor Denzel Washington stars as Carter.
- In January 2005, filmmakers Dan Klores and Ron Berger premiered their documentary Ring of Fire: The Emile Griffith Story at the Sundance Film Festival in Utah. It was broadcast on television on USA Network.
- His life was the subject of Nine...Ten...and Out!: The Two Worlds of Emile Griffith, a 2008 biography written by Ron Ross which was the first time Griffith candidly addressed his sexuality and remaining closeted in an era when being bi- or homosexual ended an athlete's career.
- In May 2012 it was announced that trumpeter Terence Blanchard and playwright Michael Cristofer were working on the opera Champion, based on Griffith's story. It premiered at Opera Theatre of Saint Louis on June 15, 2013, and made its Metropolitan Opera debut on 10 April 2023.
- A stage play based on Griffith's story, titled Brown Girl in the Ring, premiered on September 26, 2016, in Chicago. It was commissioned and produced by the Court Theatre.
- A stage play based on Griffith's story, titled Man in the Ring, premiered on November 16, 2018, at the Huntington Theater in Boston.
- Irish director Lenny Abrahamson is working on a biopic focusing on Griffith's rivalry with Paret, originally intended to be released in 2019 but subsequently delayed.

== Professional boxing record ==
112 fights	85 wins	24 losses
By knockout	23	2
By decision	62	21
By disqualification	0	1
Draws	2	
No contests	1	

No.	Result	Record	Opponent	Type	Round, time	Date	Location	Notes
112	Loss	85–24–2 (1)	Alan Minter	PTS	10	Jul 30, 1977	Stade Louis II, Fontvieille, Monaco	
111	Loss	85–23–2 (1)	Mayfield Pennington	SD	10	Jul 16, 1977	Commonwealth Convention Center, Louisville, Kentucky, U.S.	
110	Loss	85–22–2 (1)	Joel Bonnetaz	PTS	10	Apr 15, 1977	Périgueux, Dordogne, France	
109	Win	85–21–2 (1)	Christy Elliott	MD	10	Feb 2, 1977	Madison Square Garden, New York City, New York, U.S.	
108	Win	84–21–2 (1)	Frank Reiche	TKO	10 (10)	Dec 4, 1976	Ernst Merck Halle, Hamburg, West Germany	
107	Win	83–21–2 (1)	Dino Del Cid	TKO	4 (10)	Oct 24, 1976	Cartagena, Colombia	
106	Loss	82–21–2 (1)	Eckhard Dagge	MD	15	Sep 18, 1976	Deutschlandhalle, Charlottenburg, West Berlin, West Germany	For WBC light-middleweight title
105	Draw	82–20–2 (1)	Bennie Briscoe	PTS	10	Jun 26, 1976	Stade Louis II, Fontvieille, Monaco	
104	Loss	82–20–1 (1)	Loucif Hamani	UD	10	Feb 9, 1976	Palais des Sports, Paris, Paris, France	
103	Win	82–19–1 (1)	Jose Roberto Chirino	UD	10	Nov 7, 1975	Coliseum Theatre, Latham, New York, U.S.	
102	Loss	81–19–1 (1)	Elijah Makathini	PTS	10	Aug 9, 1975	Orlando Stadium, Soweto, Transvaal, South Africa	
101	Win	81–18–1 (1)	Leo Saenz	UD	10	Jul 23, 1975	Capitol Centre, Largo, Maryland, U.S.	
100	Loss	80–18–1 (1)	Jose Luis Duran	UD	10	May 31, 1974	Coliseo El Pueblo, Cali, Colombia	
99	Win	80–17–1 (1)	Donato Paduano	UD	10	Dec 10, 1974	Forum, Montreal, Quebec, Canada	
98	Loss	79–17–1 (1)	Vito Antuofermo	UD	10	Nov 22, 1974	Madison Square Garden, New York City, New York, U.S.	
97	Win	79–16–1 (1)	Bennie Briscoe	MD	10	Oct 9, 1974	The Spectrum, Philadelphia, Pennsylvania, U.S.	
96	Win	78–16–1 (1)	Renato Garcia	PTS	10	May 25, 1974	Stade Louis II, Fontvieille, Monaco	
95	Loss	77–16–1 (1)	Tony Licata	UD	12	Feb 5, 1974	Boston Garden, Boston, Massachusetts, U.S.	For WBC–NABF middleweight title
94	Loss	77–15–1 (1)	Tony Mundine	UD	12	Nov 19, 1973	Palais des Sports Porte de Versailles, Paris XV, Paris, France	
93	Win	77–14–1 (1)	Manuel González	MD	10	Nov 1, 1973	Curtis Hixon Hall, Tampa, Florida, U.S.	
92	Loss	76–14–1 (1)	Carlos Monzón	UD	15	Jun 2, 1973	Stade Louis II, Fontvieille, Monaco	For WBA, WBC, and The Ring middleweight titles
91	Draw	76–13–1 (1)	Nessim Max Cohen	PTS	10	Mar 12, 1973	Palais des Sports, Paris, Paris, France	
90	Loss	76–13 (1)	Jean-Claude Bouttier	DQ	7 (10)	Dec 18, 1972	Parc des Expositions, Paris, Paris, France	Griffith was disqualified for a low blow
89	Win	76–12 (1)	Joe DeNucci	SD	12	Oct 11, 1972	Boston Garden, Boston, Massachusetts, U.S.	
88	Win	75–12 (1)	Joe DeNucci	SD	10	Sep 16, 1972	Hynes Auditorium, Boston, Massachusetts, U.S.	
87	Win	74–12 (1)	Ernie Lopez	UD	10	Mar 30, 1972	Olympic Auditorium, Los Angeles, California, U.S.	
86	Win	73–12 (1)	Jacques Kechichian	PTS	10	Feb 21, 1972	Paris, Paris, France	
85	Win	72–12 (1)	Armando Muñíz	UD	10	Jan 31, 1972	Convention Center, Anaheim, California, U.S.	
84	Win	71–12 (1)	Danny McAloon	UD	10	Dec 10, 1971	Madison Square Garden, New York City, New York, U.S.	
83	Loss	70–12 (1)	Carlos Monzón	TKO	14 (15), 2:32	Sep 25, 1971	Estadio Luna Park, Buenos Aires, Distrito Federal, Argentina	For WBA, WBC, and The Ring middleweight titles
82	Win	70–11 (1)	Nessim Max Cohen	UD	10	Jul 26, 1971	Madison Square Garden, New York City, New York, U.S.	
81	Win	69–11 (1)	Ernie Lopez	MD	10	May 3, 1971	Nevada Sports Palace, Las Vegas, Nevada, U.S.	
80	Win	68–11 (1)	Rafael Gutierrez	UD	10	Mar 23, 1971	Civic Auditorium, San Francisco, California, U.S.	
79	Win	67–11 (1)	Juan Ramos	TKO	7 (10)	Mar 5, 1971	Charlotte Amalie, U.S. Virgin Islands	
78	Win	66–11 (1)	Nate Collins	UD	10	Nov 10, 1970	Cow Palace, Daly City, California, U.S.	
77	Win	65–11 (1)	Danny Perez	UD	12	Oct 17, 1970	Lionel Roberts Stadium, Charlotte Amalie, U.S. Virgin Islands	
76	Win	64–11 (1)	Dick Tiger	UD	10	Jul 15, 1970	Madison Square Garden, New York City, New York, U.S.	
75	Win	63–11 (1)	Tom Bogs	PTS	10	Jun 4, 1970	Valby Idraetspark, Valby, Denmark	
74	Win	62–11 (1)	Carlos Marks	UD	12	Mar 11, 1970	Madison Square Garden, New York City, New York, U.S.	
73	Win	61–11 (1)	Doyle Baird	UD	10	Jan 28, 1970	Cleveland Arena, Cleveland, Ohio, U.S.	
72	Loss	60–11 (1)	José Nápoles	UD	15	Oct 17, 1969	Forum, Inglewood, California, U.S.	For WBA, WBC, NYSAC, and The Ring welterweight titles
71	Win	60–10 (1)	Art Hernandez	SD	10	Aug 15, 1969	Sioux Falls Arena, Sioux Falls, South Dakota, U.S.	
70	Win	59–10 (1)	Dick DiVeronica	TKO	7 (10), 1:28	Jul 11, 1969	War Memorial Auditorium, Syracuse, New York, U.S.	
69	Win	58–10 (1)	Stanley Hayward	UD	12	May 12, 1969	Madison Square Garden, New York City, New York, U.S.	
68	Win	57–10 (1)	Andy Heilman	UD	10	Feb 3, 1969	Madison Square Garden, New York City, New York, U.S.	
67	Loss	56–10 (1)	Stanley Hayward	SD	10	Oct 29, 1968	The Spectrum, Philadelphia, Pennsylvania, U.S.	
66	Win	56–9 (1)	Gypsy Joe Harris	UD	12	Aug 6, 1968	The Spectrum, Philadelphia, Pennsylvania, U.S.	
65	Win	55–9 (1)	Andy Heilman	MD	12	Jun 11, 1968	Oakland Arena, Oakland, California, U.S.	
64	Loss	54–9 (1)	Nino Benvenuti	UD	15	Mar 4, 1968	Madison Square Garden, New York City, New York, U.S.	Lost WBA, WBC, and The Ring middleweight titles
63	Win	54–8 (1)	Remo Golfarini	TKO	6 (10)	Dec 15, 1967	Palazzetto dello Sport, Roma, Lazio, Italy	
62	Win	53–8 (1)	Nino Benvenuti	MD	15	Sep 29, 1967	Shea Stadium, New York City, New York, U.S.	Won WBA, WBC, and The Ring middleweight titles
61	Loss	52–8 (1)	Nino Benvenuti	UD	15	Apr 17, 1967	Madison Square Garden, New York City, New York, U.S.	Lost WBA, WBC, and The Ring middleweight titles
60	Win	52–7 (1)	Joey Archer	UD	15	Jan 23, 1967	Madison Square Garden, New York City, New York, U.S.	Retained WBA, WBC, and The Ring middleweight titles
59	Win	51–7 (1)	Joey Archer	MD	15	Jul 13, 1966	Madison Square Garden, New York City, New York, U.S.	Retained WBA, WBC, and The Ring middleweight titles
58	Win	50–7 (1)	Dick Tiger	UD	15	Apr 25, 1966	Madison Square Garden, New York City, New York, U.S.	Won WBA, WBC, and The Ring middleweight titles
57	Win	49–7 (1)	Johnny Brooks	UD	10	Feb 3, 1966	Las Vegas Convention Center, Las Vegas, Nevada, U.S.	
56	Win	48–7 (1)	Manuel González	UD	15	Dec 10, 1965	Madison Square Garden, New York City, New York, U.S.	Retained WBA, WBC, NYSAC, and The Ring welterweight titles
55	Win	47–7 (1)	Harry Scott	RTD	7 (10)	Oct 4, 1965	Royal Albert Hall, Kensington, London, England, U.K.	
54	Win	46–7 (1)	Gabe Terronez	TKO	4 (10), 2:45	Sep 14, 1965	Kearney Bowl, Fresno, California, U.S.	
53	Loss	45–7 (1)	Don Fullmer	UD	12	Aug 19, 1965	Fairgrounds Coliseum, Salt Lake City, Utah, U.S.	For vacant WBA American middleweight title
52	Win	45–6 (1)	Eddie Pace	UD	10	Jun 14, 1965	Hawaii International Center, Honolulu, Hawaii, U.S.	
51	Win	44–6 (1)	Jose Stable	UD	15	Mar 30, 1965	Madison Square Garden, New York City, New York, U.S.	Retained WBA, WBC, NYSAC, and The Ring welterweight titles
50	Loss	43–6 (1)	Manuel González	SD	10	Jan 26, 1965	Sam Houston Coliseum, Houston, Texas, U.S.	
49	Win	43–5 (1)	Dave Charnley	TKO	9 (10), 1:56	Dec 1, 1964	Empire Pool, Wembley, London, England, U.K.	
48	Win	42–5 (1)	Brian Curvis	UD	15	Sep 22, 1964	Empire Pool, Wembley, London, England, U.K.	Retained WBA, WBC, NYSAC, and The Ring welterweight titles
47	Win	41–5 (1)	Luis Manuel Rodríguez	SD	15	Jun 12, 1964	Las Vegas Convention Center, Las Vegas, Nevada, U.S.	Retained WBA, WBC, NYSAC, and The Ring welterweight titles
46	Win	40–5 (1)	Stan Harrington	KO	4 (10), 1:40	Apr 14, 1964	Hawaii International Center, Honolulu, Hawaii, U.S.	
45	NC	39–5 (1)	Juan Carlo Duran	NC	7 (10)	Mar 11, 1964	Palazzetto dello Sport, Roma, Lazio, Italy	The bout was halted when fans began throwing bottles and oranges in to the ring, because they wanted more action
44	Win	39–5	Ralph Dupas	KO	3 (12)	Feb 10, 1964	Sydney Stadium, Sydney, New South Wales, Australia	
43	Loss	38–5	Rubin Carter	TKO	1 (10), 2:13	Dec 20, 1963	Civic Arena, Pittsburgh, Pennsylvania, U.S.	
42	Win	38–4	Jose Monon Gonzalez	MD	10	Oct 5, 1963	Hiram Bithorn Stadium, San Juan, Puerto Rico	
41	Win	37–4	Holly Mims	UD	10	Aug 10, 1963	Convention Center, Saratoga Springs, New York, U.S.	
40	Win	36–4	Luis Manuel Rodríguez	SD	15	Jun 8, 1963	Madison Square Garden, New York City, New York, U.S.	Won WBA, WBC, NYSAC, and The Ring welterweight titles
39	Loss	35–4	Luis Manuel Rodríguez	UD	15	Mar 21, 1963	Dodger Stadium, Los Angeles, California, U.S.	Lost WBA, WBC, NYSAC, and The Ring welterweight titles
38	Win	35–3	Christian Christensen	TKO	9 (15)	Feb 3, 1963	Forum, Copenhagen, Denmark	Retained world light-middleweight title; Recognized by the Austrian Boxing Board of Control
37	Win	34–3	Jorge Fernandez	TKO	9 (15)	Dec 8, 1962	Las Vegas Convention Center, Las Vegas, Nevada, U.S.	Retained NYSAC, WBA, and The Ring welterweight titles
36	Win	33–3	Ted Wright	PTS	15	Oct 17, 1962	Stadthalle, Vienna, Austria	Won inaugural world light-middleweight title; Recognized by the Austrian Boxing Board of Control, but by no other agencies
35	Win	32–3	Don Fullmer	UD	10	Oct 6, 1962	Madison Square Garden, New York City, New York, U.S.	
34	Win	31–3	Denny Moyer	SD	10	Aug 18, 1962	Sports Arena, Tacoma, Washington, U.S.	
33	Win	30–3	Ralph Dupas	UD	15	Jul 13, 1962	Las Vegas Convention Center, Las Vegas, Nevada, U.S.	Retained NYSAC, NBA, and The Ring welterweight titles
32	Win	29–3	Benny Paret	TKO	12 (15), 2:09	Mar 24, 1962	Madison Square Garden, New York City, New York, U.S.	Won NYSAC, NBA, and The Ring welterweight titles; Paret died on Apr 3, 1962, from injuries sustained in the fight
31	Win	28–3	Johnny Torres	UD	10	Feb 3, 1962	Lionel Roberts Stadium, Saint Thomas, U.S. Virgin Islands	
30	Win	27–3	Isaac Logart	MD	10	Dec 23, 1961	St. Nicholas Arena, New York City, New York, U.S.	
29	Win	26–3	Stanford Bulla	KO	4 (10), 2:35	Nov 4, 1961	Hamilton, Bermuda	
28	Loss	25–3	Benny Paret	SD	15	Sep 30, 1961	Madison Square Garden, New York City, New York, U.S.	Lost NYSAC, NBA, and The Ring welterweight titles
27	Win	25–2	Yama Bahama	UD	10	Jul 29, 1961	Madison Square Garden, New York City, New York, U.S.	
26	Win	24–2	Gaspar Ortega	TKO	12 (15), 0:48	Jun 3, 1961	Olympic Auditorium, Los Angeles, California, U.S.	Retained NYSAC, NBA, and The Ring welterweight titles
25	Win	23–2	Benny Paret	KO	13 (15), 1:11	Apr 1, 1961	Miami Beach Convention Hall, Miami Beach, Florida, U.S.	Won NYSAC, NBA, and The Ring welterweight titles
24	Win	22–2	Luis Manuel Rodríguez	SD	10	Dec 17, 1960	Madison Square Garden, New York City, New York, U.S.	
23	Win	21–2	Willie Toweel	TKO	8 (10), 3:00	Oct 22, 1960	Madison Square Garden, New York City, New York, U.S.	
22	Win	20–2	Florentino Fernández	UD	10	Aug 25, 1960	Madison Square Garden, New York City, New York, U.S.	
21	Win	19–2	Jorge Fernandez	UD	10	Jul 25, 1960	Madison Square Garden, New York City, New York, U.S.	
20	Win	18–2	Jorge Fernandez	SD	10	Jun 3, 1960	St. Nicholas Arena, New York City, New York, U.S.	
19	Loss	17–2	Denny Moyer	SD	10	Apr 26, 1960	Pacific Livestock Pavilion, Portland, Oregon, U.S.	
18	Win	17–1	Denny Moyer	SD	10	Mar 11, 1960	Madison Square Garden, New York City, New York, U.S.	
17	Win	16–1	Gaspar Ortega	SD	10	Feb 12, 1960	Madison Square Garden, New York City, New York, U.S.	
16	Win	15–1	Roberto Peña	UD	10	Jan 8, 1960	Madison Square Garden, New York City, New York, U.S.	
15	Win	14–1	Ray Lancaster	TKO	7 (10), 1:44	Nov 23, 1959	Academy of Music, New York City, New York, U.S.	
14	Loss	13–1	Randy Sandy	SD	10	Oct 26, 1959	Academy of Music, New York City, New York, U.S.	
13	Win	13–0	Kid Fichique	UD	10	Aug 7, 1959	Madison Square Garden, New York City, New York, U.S.	
12	Win	12–0	Willie Stevenson	UD	10	May 25, 1959	St. Nicholas Arena, New York City, New York, U.S.	
11	Win	11–0	Mel Barker	UD	10	Apr 27, 1959	St. Nicholas Arena, New York City, New York, U.S.	
10	Win	10–0	Bobby Shell	UD	10	Mar 23, 1959	St. Nicholas Arena, New York City, New York, U.S.	
9	Win	9–0	Barry Allison	TKO	5 (10), 2:44	Feb 23, 1959	St. Nicholas Arena, New York City, New York, U.S.	
8	Win	8–0	Willie Joe Johnson	TKO	5 (6), 1:52	Feb 9, 1959	St. Nicholas Arena, New York City, New York, U.S.	
7	Win	7–0	Gaylord Barnes	TKO	5 (6), 1:46	Jan 26, 1959	St. Nicholas Arena, New York City, New York, U.S.	
6	Win	6–0	Larry Jones	KO	5 (6), 2:17	Dec 15, 1958	St. Nicholas Arena, New York City, New York, U.S.	
5	Win	5–0	Sergio Rios	KO	3 (6), 1:01	Nov 17, 1958	St. Nicholas Arena, New York City, New York, U.S.	
4	Win	4–0	Artie Cunningham	PTS	6	Oct 6, 1958	St. Nicholas Arena, New York City, New York, U.S.	
3	Win	3–0	Tommy Leaks	PTS	4	Jul 21, 1958	St. Nicholas Arena, New York City, New York, U.S.	
2	Win	2–0	Bruce Gibson	PTS	4	Jun 23, 1958	St. Nicholas Arena, New York City, New York, U.S.	
1	Win	1–0	Joe Parham	PTS	4	Jun 2, 1958	St. Nicholas Arena, New York City, New York, U.S.	

== Titles in boxing ==
=== Major world titles ===
- NYSAC welterweight champion (147 lbs) (3×)
- NBA (WBA) welterweight champion (147 lbs) (3×) (Note: The NBA officially became the WBA during his second title reign)
- WBC welterweight champion (Note: Was awarded the inaugural title in February 1963.) (147 lbs) (2×)
- WBA middleweight champion (160 lbs) (2×)
- WBC middleweight champion (160 lbs) (2×)

=== The Ring magazine titles ===
- The Ring welterweight champion (147 lbs) (3×)
- The Ring middleweight champion (160 lbs) (2×)

=== Undisputed titles ===
- Undisputed welterweight champion (3×)
- Undisputed middleweight champion

=== Honorary titles ===
- Austrian Boxing Board of Control World light middleweight champion (154 lbs) (Note: The Austrian Boxing Board of Control is the only organization to recognize him as World light middleweight champion.)

== Honors ==
- Named The Ring Fighter of the Year for 1964.
- A park has been named in Griffith's honor in his native US Virgin Islands.

== Recording artist ==
Emile Griffith had a brief career as a recording artist between 1966 and 1969. He recorded two 45s released on the Columbia Records and 'Going, Going Gone', a moderately successful record for Ray Charles's Tangerine label.

== See also ==
- List of welterweight boxing champions
- List of light middleweight boxing champions
- List of middleweight boxing champions
- List of WBC world champions
- List of WBA world champions
- List of undisputed boxing champions
- List of boxing triple champions

== Notes and references ==
=== References ===
Sporting positions
World boxing titles
Preceded by Benny Paret	NYSAC welterweight champion April 1, 1961 – September 30, 1961	Succeeded by Benny Paret
Preceded by Benny Paret	NBA welterweight champion April 1, 1961 – September 30, 1961	Succeeded by Benny Paret
Preceded by Benny Paret	The Ring welterweight champion April 1, 1961 – September 30, 1961	Succeeded by Benny Paret
Preceded by Benny Paret	Undisputed welterweight champion April 1, 1961 – September 30, 1961	Succeeded by Benny Paret
Preceded by Benny Paret	NYSAC welterweight champion March 24, 1962 – March 21, 1963	Succeeded by Luis Manuel Rodríguez
Preceded by Benny Paret	WBA welterweight champion March 24, 1962 – March 21, 1963; Became WBA in 1962	Succeeded by Luis Manuel Rodríguez
Preceded by Benny Paret	The Ring welterweight champion March 24, 1962 – March 21, 1963	Succeeded by Luis Manuel Rodríguez
Preceded by Benny Paret	Undisputed welterweight champion March 24, 1962 – March 21, 1963	Succeeded by Luis Manuel Rodríguez
Inaugural	WBC welterweight champion February 1963 – March 21, 1963	Succeeded by Luis Manuel Rodríguez
Preceded by Luis Manuel Rodríguez	NYSAC welterweight champion June 8, 1963 – 1966; Stripped	Vacant Title next held by Curtis Cokes
Preceded by Luis Manuel Rodríguez	WBA welterweight champion June 8, 1963 – June 10, 1966; Stripped	Vacant Title next held by Curtis Cokes
Preceded by Luis Manuel Rodríguez	WBC welterweight champion June 8, 1963 – August 1, 1966; Stripped	Vacant Title next held by Curtis Cokes
Preceded by Luis Manuel Rodríguez	The Ring welterweight champion June 8, 1963 – 1966; Vacated	Vacant Title next held by Curtis Cokes
Preceded by Luis Manuel Rodríguez	Undisputed welterweight champion June 8, 1963 – June 10, 1966; Titles fragmented	Vacant Title next held by Curtis Cokes
Inaugural	World light-middleweight champion October 17, 1962 – February 1963; Vacated	Vacant Title next held by Denny Moyer as Undisputed champion
Preceded by Dick Tiger	WBA middleweight champion April 25, 1966 – April 16, 1967	Succeeded by Nino Benvenuti
Preceded by Dick Tiger	WBC middleweight champion April 25, 1966 – April 16, 1967	Succeeded by Nino Benvenuti
Preceded by Dick Tiger	The Ring middleweight champion April 25, 1966 – April 16, 1967	Succeeded by Nino Benvenuti
Preceded by Dick Tiger	Undisputed middleweight champion April 25, 1966 – April 16, 1967	Succeeded by Nino Benvenuti
Preceded by Nino Benvenuti	WBA middleweight champion September 29, 1967 – March 4, 1968	Succeeded by Nino Benvenuti
Preceded by Nino Benvenuti	WBC middleweight champion September 29, 1967 – March 4, 1968	Succeeded by Nino Benvenuti
Preceded by Nino Benvenuti	The Ring middleweight champion September 29, 1967 – March 4, 1968	Succeeded by Nino Benvenuti
Preceded by Nino Benvenuti	Undisputed middleweight champion September 29, 1967 – March 4, 1968	Succeeded by Nino Benvenuti
