= José Durán (boxer) =

Spanish boxer (born 1945)

Personal information
- Nickname: Pepe
- Nationality: Spanish
- Born: José Manuel Durán Pérez; 9 October 1945 (age 80) Madrid, Spain
- Height: 5 ft 9 in (1.75 m)
- Weight: Light Middleweight

Boxing career
- Reach: 71 in (180 cm)
- Stance: Orthodox

Boxing record
- Total fights: 79
- Wins: 63
- Win by KO: 23
- Losses: 6
- Draws: 9

José Manuel Durán Pérez, popularly known as "Pepe Durán" (born October 9, 1945, in Madrid, Spain) is a former Spanish professional boxer. During his eleven-year professional career Duran held the Lineal and WBA light middleweight titles. He challenged for the WBC version of the title and held the EBU title. He also competed in the men's welterweight event at the 1968 Summer Olympics.

== Professional career ==
Duran made his professional debut on November 30, 1967, in Barcelona, Spain. Duran made a victorious start to his career by scoring a knockout over Ben Hamida in the third round. After winning 22 consecutive bouts Duran suffered his first defeat, losing to Jean Josselin via an eight-round decision on June 22, 1970. Duran was able to avenge this defeat on May 21, 1971, once again the fight went the eight round distance although Duran won the decision on this occasion. Duran won his first championship on June 7, 1974, by beating Jacques Kechichian and thus winning the EBU title.

On May 7, 1975, Duran made his first attempt at winning the world title. He travelled to Monaco to fight Miguel de Oliveira for the vacant WBC Light Middleweight title. De Oliveira, a native of Brazil, won the title via a unanimous decision after a bloody battle which lasted the full fifteen rounds. In his next fight Duran lost his EBU title in Germany to Eckhard Dagge, a man Duran had previously beaten by a technical knockout in the eleventh round. On this occasion, however, it was Dagge who scored the knockout, with the fight being stopped in the ninth round.

Duran once again challenged for the world title on May 18, 1976. On this occasion Duran travelled to Tokyo, Japan to successfully challenge Koichi Wajima for the Lineal and WBA light middleweight titles. Duran started the fight well by opening a large cut on the champion's forehead and knocking him down in the second round. Wajima was knocked down once again in the thirteenth round before the fight was finally stopped in the fourteenth.

Duran lost his title in his first defence, against the Argentine challenger Miguel Angel Castellini on October 8, 1976. Duran, fighting in his home city of Madrid, was knocked down in the third round by a left hand to the jaw. Although Duran rose from the canvas, he was outworked by the faster challenger and lost his title via a split decision in a fight where both boxers finished with bloody faces.

In his final fight Duran challenged the Italian-Australian champion Rocky Mattioli for the WBC Light Middleweight title. The result was never in doubt, as Mattioli knocked Duran down in the second, fourth and early in the fifth before delivering the final knockout punch late in the fifth round.

== Professional boxing record ==
78 fights	63 wins	6 losses
By knockout	23	2
By decision	38	4
By disqualification	2	0
Draws	9	

No.	Result	Record	Opponent	Type	Round, time	Date	Location	Notes
78	Loss	63–6–9	Rocky Mattioli	KO	5 (15), 2:22	May 14, 1977	Stadio Adriatico, Pescara, Italy	For WBC junior middleweight title
77	Win	63–5–9	Moussa Kassongo Mukandjo	KO	6 (8)	Oct 1, 1977	Palma de Mallorca, Spain	
76	Loss	62–5–9	Miguel Ángel Castellini	SD	15	Oct 8, 1976	Palacio de los Deportes, Madrid, Spain	Lost WBA and The Ring junior middleweight titles
75	Win	62–4–9	Peter Scheibner	PTS	10	Aug 7, 1976	Club Raúl, Lepe, Spain	
74	Win	61–4–9	Juarez de Lima	PTS	8	Jun 30, 1976	Palacio de los Deportes, Madrid, Spain	
73	Win	60–4–9	Koichi Wajima	KO	14 (15), 0:50	May 18, 1976	Nihon University Auditorium, Japan	Won WBA and The Ring junior middleweight titles
72	Win	59–4–9	Aroldo Olivares	PTS	8	Apr 2, 1976	Palacio de los Deportes, Madrid, Spain	
71	Draw	58–4–9	Jules Bellaiche	PTS	8	Jan 30, 1976	Palacio de los Deportes, Barcelona, Spain	
70	Win	58–4–8	Dino Fleitas	PTS	8	Dec 20, 1975	Palacio Municipal de Deportes, Leon, Spain	
69	Win	57–4–8	Mario Molina	PTS	8	Nov 8, 1975	Pabellón Municipal, Alicante, Spain	
68	Draw	56–4–8	Jules Bellaiche	PTS	8	Oct 17, 1975	Palacio de los Deportes, Madrid, Spain	
67	Loss	56–4–7	Eckhard Dagge	TKO	9 (15)	Jun 24, 1975	Deutschlandhalle, Germany	Lost European junior middleweight title
66	Loss	56–3–7	Miguel de Oliveira	UD	15	May 7, 1975	Stade Louis II, Fontvieille, Monaco	For vacant WBC junior middleweight title
65	Win	56–2–7	Peter Scheibner	PTS	10	Feb 14, 1975	Palacio de los Deportes, Barcelona, Spain	
64	Win	55–2–7	Franz Csandl	PTS	15	Jan 7, 1975	Stadthalle, Vienna, Austria	Retained European junior middleweight title
63	Win	54–2–7	Johann Orsolics	TKO	14 (15)	Nov 5, 1974	Germany	Retained European junior middleweight title
62	Win	53–2–7	Eckhard Dagge	TKO	11 (15)	Sep 3, 1974	Deutschlandhalle, Germany	Retained European junior middleweight title
61	Win	52–2–7	Michel Chapier	PTS	8	Jul 26, 1974	Campo del Gas, Madrid, Spain	
60	Win	51–2–7	Gray Ibekwe	TKO	6 (8)	Jul 12, 1974	Palma de Mallorca, Spain	
59	Win	50–2–7	Jacques Kechichian	UD	15	Jun 7, 1974	Palacio de los Deportes, Madrid, Spain	Won European junior middleweight title
58	Win	49–2–7	Gerard Cola	PTS	8	Apr 30, 1974	Palacio de los Deportes, Barcelona, Spain	
57	Win	48–2–7	Gray Ibekwe	PTS	8	Apr 5, 1974	Palacio de los Deportes, Madrid, Spain	
56	Win	47–2–7	Michel Chapier	PTS	8	Dec 28, 1973	Palacio de los Deportes, Barcelona, Spain	
55	Win	46–2–7	Vincent Parra	PTS	10	Dec 14, 1973	Madrid, Spain	
54	Win	45–2–7	Jose Luis Pacheco	PTS	8	Nov 23, 1973	Palacio de los Deportes, Barcelona, Spain	
53	Win	44–2–7	Francis Vermandere	PTS	10	Oct 11, 1973	Palacio de los Deportes, Madrid, Spain	
52	Win	43–2–7	Bo Hogberg	PTS	8	Aug 1, 1973	Plaza de Toros del Coliseo Balear, Palma de Mallorca, Spain	
51	Win	42–2–7	Jose Maria Madrazo	PTS	12	Jun 30, 1973	Frontón de la Ciudad Deportiva, Burgos, Spain	Retained Spanish junior middleweight title
50	Draw	41–2–7	Fighting Mack	PTS	10	May 28, 1973	Sportpaleis Ahoy', Rotterdam, Netherlands	
49	Win	41–2–6	Juan Jose Pardo	TKO	6 (8)	Feb 8, 1973	Pabellón de La Casilla, Bilbao, Spain	
48	Win	40–2–6	Daniel Makre	RTD	6 (8)	Dec 16, 1972	Pamplona, Spain	
47	Win	39–2–6	Michel Chapier	PTS	8	Oct 6, 1972	Palacio de los Deportes, Madrid, Spain	
46	Draw	38–2–6	Antonio Torres	PTS	8	Sep 29, 1972	Gran Price, Barcelona, Spain	
45	Win	38–2–5	Giancarlo Garbelli	TKO	2 (10)	Aug 25, 1972	Campo del Gas, Madrid, Spain	
44	Win	37–2–5	Jose Maria Madrazo	PTS	12	Aug 1, 1972	Plaza de Toros Monumental, Barcelona, Spain	Won vacant Spanish junior middleweight title
43	Loss	36–2–5	Angel Guinaldo	PTS	8	Jul 12, 1972	Gran Price, Barcelona, Spain	
42	Win	36–1–5	Dorman Crawford	TKO	3 (8)	Jun 21, 1972	Gran Price, Barcelona, Spain	
41	Win	35–1–5	Delfim Tavares	DQ	2 (10)	Jun 15, 1972	Pabellón de La Casilla, Bilbao, Spain	
40	Win	34–1–5	Jean Baptiste Rolland	RTD	4 (8)	May 3, 1972	Gran Price, Barcelona, Spain	
39	Win	33–1–5	Dramane Ouedraogo	RTD	8 (10)	Mar 3, 1972	Madrid, Spain	
38	Win	32–1–5	Domenico Tiberia	PTS	10	Feb 2, 1972	Gran Price, Barcelona, Spain	
37	Draw	31–1–5	Francisco Ferri	PTS	8	Jan 13, 1972	Gran Price, Barcelona, Spain	
36	Win	31–1–4	Miguel Munoz	TKO	5 (8)	Dec 29, 1971	Gran Price, Barcelona, Spain	
35	Draw	30–1–4	Epifanio Collado	PTS	10	Nov 27, 1971	Pabellón del Centro Deportivo Municipal, Vigo, Spain	
34	Draw	30–1–3	José Hernandez	PTS	10	Nov 5, 1971	Palacio de los Deportes, Madrid, Spain	
33	Win	30–1–2	Mooreday Adigun	PTS	8	Oct 15, 1971	Gran Price, Barcelona, Spain	
32	Draw	29–1–2	Fabio Bettini	PTS	10	Jul 8, 1971	Valencia, Spain	
31	Win	29–1–1	Jean Josselin	PTS	8	May 21, 1971	Palacio de los Deportes, Madrid, Spain	
30	Win	28–1–1	Frank Young	PTS	8	Feb 11, 1971	Gran Price, Barcelona, Spain	
29	Win	27–1–1	Antonio Torres	PTS	8	Dec 18, 1970	Palacio de los Deportes, Madrid, Spain	
28	Win	26–1–1	Bobby Arthur	PTS	10	Nov 21, 1970	Pabellón Polideportivo del Real Madrid, Madrid, Spain	
27	Win	25–1–1	Eduardo Batista	TKO	4 (10)	Nov 6, 1970	Pabellón de La Casilla, Bilbao, Spain	
26	Draw	24–1–1	Antonio Torres	PTS	10	Sep 11, 1970	Palacio de los Deportes, Barcelona, Spain	For Spanish welterweight title
25	Win	24–1	Angel Robinson Garcia	PTS	10	Aug 21, 1970	Campo del Gas, Madrid, Spain	
24	Win	23–1	Dante Pelaez	PTS	8	Aug 1, 1970	Plaza de Toros del Chofre, San Sebastian, Spain	
23	Loss	22–1	Jean Josselin	PTS	8	Jun 22, 1970	Plaza de Toros Monumental, Barcelona, Spain	
22	Win	22–0	Ferdinand Ahumibe	TKO	6 (8)	May 14, 1970	Palacio de los Deportes, Madrid, Spain	
21	Win	21–0	John White	PTS	8	Apr 24, 1970	Palacio de los Deportes, Madrid, Spain	
20	Win	20–0	Eduardo Batista	TKO	7 (8)	Mar 20, 1970	Pabellón Polideportivo del Real Madrid, Madrid, Spain	
19	Win	19–0	Bob Cofie	PTS	8	Feb 5, 1970	Palacio de los Deportes, Barcelona, Spain	
18	Win	18–0	Vicente Tomas Mokhtar	PTS	8	Nov 28, 1969	Teatro Circo Price, Madrid, Spain	
17	Win	17–0	Daniel Makre	DQ	3 (8)	Nov 13, 1969	Gran Price, Barcelona, Spain	Makre was DQ'd for illegal use of his head
16	Win	16–0	Vicente Tomas Mokhtar	PTS	8	Oct 31, 1969	Pabellón Municipal de Deportes, Gijon, Spain	
15	Win	15–0	Giovanni Murgia	PTS	8	Oct 23, 1969	Gran Price, Barcelona, Spain	
14	Win	14–0	Juan Jose Antin	PTS	8	Oct 9, 1969	Gran Price, Barcelona, Spain	
13	Win	13–0	Aldo Mondora	RTD	4 (8)	Oct 2, 1969	Gran Price, Barcelona, Spain	
12	Win	12–0	Jose Maria Iturri	TKO	6 (8)	Sep 18, 1969	Gran Price, Barcelona, Spain	
11	Win	11–0	Joaquin Martin	KO	4 (10)	Jul 24, 1969	Campo del Gas, Madrid, Spain	
10	Win	10–0	Pablo Vallecillo	PTS	8	Jun 20, 1969	Gran Price, Barcelona, Spain	
9	Win	9–0	Quintino Soares	TKO	2 (8)	May 29, 1969	Gran Price, Barcelona, Spain	
8	Win	8–0	Sule Adisa	PTS	8	Apr 26, 1969	Frontón Vitoriano, Vitoria, Spain	
7	Win	7–0	Rocky Canadas	PTS	8	Apr 18, 1969	Palacio de los Deportes, Madrid, Spain	
6	Win	6–0	Pablo Vallecillo	PTS	8	Feb 28, 1969	Gran Price, Barcelona, Spain	
5	Win	5–0	Jose Maria Riba	RTD	2 (8)	Feb 20, 1969	Gran Price, Barcelona, Spain	
4	Win	4–0	Mauricio Hernan	PTS	8	Feb 7, 1969	Teatro Circo Price, Madrid, Spain	
3	Win	3–0	Jose Arnau	KO	4 (8)	Jan 31, 1969	Teatro Circo Price, Madrid, Spain	
2	Win	2–0	Roy Ate	TKO	4 (6)	Dec 17, 1968	Gran Price, Barcelona, Spain	
1	Win	1–0	Ahmed ben Hamida	KO	2 (6)	Nov 30, 1968	Gran Price, Barcelona, Spain	

== See also ==
- List of world light-middleweight boxing champions

Sporting positions
Regional boxing titles
Preceded by Jacques Kechichian	EBU super-welterweight champion June 7, 1974 – June 24, 1975	Succeeded by Eckhard Dagge
World boxing titles
Preceded by Koichi Wajima	WBA super welterweight champion May 18, 1976 - October 8, 1976	Succeeded by Miguel Ángel Castellini
Preceded by Koichi Wajima	The Ring super welterweight champion May 18, 1976 - October 8, 1976	Succeeded by Miguel Ángel Castellini
