= Nessim Max Cohen =

French boxer (born 1942)

Nessim Max Cohen (aka Max Cohen)
Personal information
- Born: 1 December 1942 Safi, Morocco
- Height: 178 cm (5 ft 10 in)
- Weight: Middleweight

Boxing career
- Stance: Orthdodox

Boxing record
- Total fights: 53
- Wins: 34
- Win by KO: 20
- Losses: 10
- Draws: 9

Nessim Max Cohen (born December 1, 1942) is a Moroccan-born French former professional boxer who competed from 1963 to 1976. He won the French middleweight championship in 1971 and 1974.

== Early Life and amateur career ==
Nessim Max Cohen was born to Jewish family in Safi, Morocco, the oldest of six children; the family moved to Casablanca when he was one year old. While working in a printing house, he forged his father's signature to start amateur boxing. At age 18 he won the Moroccan amateur championship; this led him to winning the 67 kg. championship at the Pan-Arab Games in Casablanca in 1961. His final opponent was an Egyptian who initially refused to fight because he was Jewish, before being knocked out. He received the medal directly from Hassan II, King of Morocco. He continued amateur boxing in Morocco until moving to France in 1962 to pursue a professional career.

== Professional career ==
Early in his professional career Cohen had difficulty finding remunerative bouts and had to travel extensively, including fights as far away as Seattle and Nouméa, New Caledonia. He fought many of the leading boxers of the era and fought in some of the biggest international venues, such as Madison Square Garden and Wembley Arena. Cohen's Moroccan-Jewish origins and career in France helped make him popular with different groups including Jews, Arabs and pieds-noirs. He was rated as high as second in the National Boxing Association's world ranking as a middleweight in 1976. In 1974 fought Emile Griffith, a past five-time world champion, to a draw, as he did in 1975 with future light heavyweight champion Eddie Mustafa Muhammad. He won the French middleweight title twice; in 1971 he won by decision against Fabio Bettini and in 1974 with an 11th round TKO of Jean-Claude Bouttier. In 1976 he lost a WBC world championship middleweight fight to Rodrigo Valdes on a fourth round TKO; he retired after the fight. He had a career record of 34 wins, 10 loses and 9 draws.

Nessim Max Cohen was one of several North African Jewish boxers who achieved prominence after World War II, including Robert Cohen, Gilbert Cohen and Alphonse Halimi. In 2016 a ceremony was held in Morocco honoring notable Jewish boxers, Cohen was thanked for his contribution the glory of Moroccan boxing. Cohen stated he was proud to be a Moroccan.

== Retirement ==
He retired from boxing at age 35. He started a successful customs brokerage business and then opened two restaurants in Paris. In 2011 he moved to Israel.

== Personal ==
His family, including his five sisters, moved to Israel in 1962; his father was a truck driver in Tel Aviv. As of 2013 he lived in Ashod, Israel, with his wife Yaffa and five children.

After leaving Morocco he wore the Star of David on his boxing trunks in all his fights.

Jean-Paul Belmondo was a friend of Cohen; he wrote a preface to Cohen and Dominique Zardi's co-authored book about Cohen's life, L'Étoile au poing, 1974, Calmann-Lévy editions.
