= Fernand Marcotte =

Canadian boxer

Personal information
- Nationality: (Canada) Canadian
- Born: Fernand Marcotte Jr. August 14, 1949 Quebec City, Quebec, Canada
- Height: 5 ft 8 in (173cm)
- Weight: Middleweight

Boxing career
- Reach: 68 in (173cm)
- Stance: Orthodox

Boxing record
- Total fights: 69
- Wins: 51
- Win by KO: 32
- Losses: 14
- Draws: 4

Fernand Marcotte was a Canadian former professional middleweight boxer who won the Canadian middleweight title five times.

== Early life ==
Fernand Marcotte Jr. was born in Quebec City, Quebec, Canada.

== Amateur boxing career ==
As an amateur, he won the Commonwealth championship title before he entered the pro ranks in 1970. Fernand Marcotte Sr., his father, was responsible for supervising, advising, training, and managing him.

== Professional career ==
Fernando Marcotte launched his professional boxing career on March 16, 1970, in Quebec City, where he faced Robert Lalonde.

Marcotte's rivalry with Donato Paduano produced two major fights: they fought to a stalemate in 1971, with Paduano winning their 1972 rematch. Marcotte became the first fighter to knock Paduano down. During their initial bout, Marcotte was floored in the opening round but recovered to win via split decision. However, an official later arrived in the locker room after the fight to inform them the verdict had been overturned and the bout was ruled a draw.

=== Taking the NABF welterweight championship, August 1972 ===
He knocked out Al Romano for the North American Boxing Federation welterweight championship on August 21, 1972.

=== Loss against reigning Canadian welterweight champion Clyde Gray, December 1973 ===
The following year, in December 1973, he faced 40-3-1 Clyde Gray at the Colisée de Québec for the Canadian welterweight championship, losing by TKO.

In 1975, he challenged Elisha Obed, who held a 54-1-2 record, for the North American Boxing Federation super welterweight title in Miami Beach, suffering a TKO defeat.

=== Taking the Canadian middleweight championship, March 1976 ===
Fernand Marcotte captured the Canadian middleweight title in March 1976 with a TKO victory over Lawrence Hafey.

He successfully defended his title that year against Garry Broughton and Jean Claude LeClair. In a 1977 rematch with Elisha Obed, he lost by unanimous decision.

=== Losing the Canadian middleweight championship to Gerald Bouchard, April 1977 ===
That same year, he fought Gerald Bouchard, losing his Canadian title in April 1977 and then regaining it against Bouchard that July.

==== Notable bouts during middleweight title reign ====
His second title defense against Jean Claude LeClair came in June 1978, ending with a knockout win. He then fought an undefeated Eddie Melo of Toronto for the first time in a non-title bout at Verdun Auditorium, losing by split decision.

Marcotte went up against an undefeated Sugar Ray Leonard at the Miami Beach Convention Center on February 2, 1979. Against Leonard, who was debuting at middleweight, Marcotte suffered an eighth-round TKO loss as his opponent remained unbeaten through 19 professional fights.

In his second bout against Eddie Melo on June 26, 1979, he successfully defended his Canadian title with a decision victory. He gave Melo his first lost. The title fight was hosted on the same card as Sugar Ray Leonard vs. Roberto Durán.

=== Losing the Canadian middleweight championship to Ralph Hollett, January 1980 ===
Marcotte lost his middleweight title on January 22, 1980, to Ralph Hollett of Halifax in a 12-round bout.

For the third and final time, in June 1980, he faced Eddie Melo at the Olympic Stadium, resulting in a draw. Following back-to-back wins, he lost to Ralph Hollet by TKO in their rematch for the Canadian middleweight championship, then had one additional bout in December 1982 before retiring.

After several years away from boxing, Marcotte came out of retirement in 1990 with a bout against Denis Sigouin, followed by two fights against Ron Savoie. He secured a win against Savoie in May 1995 in a non-title fight.

=== Loss against reigning Canadian super middleweight champion Ron Savoie, September 1995 ===
He faced defending champion Ron Savoie again in September 1995, this time with the Canadian Super Middleweight championship on the line, losing by unanimous decision in his last career fight.

== Professional boxing record ==
69 fights	51 wins	14 losses
By knockout	32	6
By decision	19	8
Draws	4	

== Legacy ==
Marcotte reached the eighth world ranking in the middleweight division in 1976.

He was inducted into the Quebec Sports Hall of Fame ("Panthéon des sports du Québec") on September 24, 2019.

A community center was named after him in Saint-Alban, Quebec.
