= George Francis (trainer) =

British boxer

George Albert Francis (1928–3 or 4 April 2002), known professionally as George Francis, was a British boxing athletic trainer who trained world champion boxers such as Frank Bruno, John Conteh, John Mugabi, and Cornelius Boza-Edwards, and European champion Bunny Sterling, who also became the first West Caribbean boxer to claim a British title, fighting under Francis' tutelage.

== Biography ==
George Francis was born in Camden Town, north London. He was only eight when his father died, and left school at the age of 11 to support his family. In the 1930s, he was a bare-knuckle fighter. After a local policeman persuaded him to give that up he turned to amateur boxing. Francis worked his way up the ranks at Covent Garden Market and eventually became a porter. He was a member of a local boxing club and it was there that he decided to switch from boxer to trainer. These early ventures into the fight game were to be the start of a career which saw him become involved with some of the greatest boxers in the world.

Francis was known for making his boxers run on Hampstead Heath and swim in the cold water of Highgate Men's Pond as part of their training.

After Paul McCartney visited Francis's gym to watch Conteh train, McCartney employed Francis's son Michael as a bodyguard.

== Death ==
Francis was found hanged at his home in Hillway, Highgate, apparently having died by suicide on 3 or 4 April 2002. He was 73. His death followed a period of severe depression that occurred after the deaths of both his wife, Joan, and his son, Simon.
