= Brian Anderson (British boxer) =

English boxer

Personal information
- Nationality: British
- Born: 9 July 1961 (age 65) Sheffield, England
- Height: 6 ft 1 in (1.85 m)
- Weight: Middleweight

Boxing career

Boxing record
- Total fights: 39
- Wins: 27
- Win by KO: 14
- Losses: 9
- Draws: 3

Brian Anderson (born 9 July 1961) is a British prison officer and former boxer who was a middleweight champion between 1986 and 1987. Since retiring from boxing he has worked for HM Prison Service.

== Early life ==
Born in Sheffield in 1961 to Jamaican-born parents, Anderson took up boxing after getting into trouble and being taken at the age of 13 by a social worker to the Croft House youth club, which had a boxing gym. At school he was taught PE by Howard Wilkinson and ran in the same cross-country running team as Sebastian Coe. Realising he had a talent for boxing he focused his energies on the sport and represented England at amateur level four years later. On a trip to Germany with the England team he met Brendan Ingle and later joined Ingle's St. Thomas's gym in Wincobank.

== Career ==
=== Boxing ===
Anderson began his professional career in 1980. His first chance to earn an opportunity to fight for the British Title was unsuccessful when he lost to Prince Rodney in a final eliminator for the British light middleweight title in March 1983; Rodney stopped Anderson in the fifth round.

For a brief period Anderson moved up to middleweight beating Jimmy Ellis and in May 1983 to win the Central Area middleweight title. He made a successful defence of the title in May 1984 against Sammy Brennan.

In November 1984 he again dropped down to light middleweight to face Chris Pyatt in a final eliminator for the British title; Pyatt won on points.

He made a second defence of his Central Area title in February 1986 against Steve Johnson. The fight was also a final eliminator for the British Middleweight Title. In October got his first shot at a British title when he faced Tony Burke for the vacant middleweight title. The title had been vacated by Anderson's friend and gym mate Herol Bomber Graham. Anderson stopped Burke in the eighth round to take the title. In September 1987 Anderson defended the British title against Tony Sibson at the Royal Albert Hall with Sibson's commonwealth title also at stake. Sibson stopped Anderson in the seventh round. This proved to be Anderson's final fight.

=== Prison officer ===
After retiring from boxing, Anderson became a referee and went on to train as a probation officer and study at Huddersfield Polytechnic, qualifying in 1988. He went on to work in the Prison Service as the country's first anti-bullying officer in 1994. He told reporter Alan Hubbard of UK newspaper The Independent, "The then chief inspector of prisons, Sir David Ramsbottom, seemed to like what we were doing. I told him I had always wanted to be some kind of social reformer and it was he who suggested that I should aim to become a prison governor. I found there was a graduate scheme and managed to get on it – the first black candidate to do so, in September 1997".

In 2006 Anderson became only the second black prison chief in the UK, taking charge of the Serco-run HM Prison Doncaster. Following his appointment he told the BBC, "I can say without a shadow of a doubt that boxing is responsible for me being here now. However, I was lucky, I joined a youth club where they had a boxing gym and I got involved in boxing. Instantly I found that it was something I could do, and do very well. It is quite ironic really, because when I was young people used to say 'you're going to end up in prison'. I don't think this is quite what they had in mind." Expanding on this theme, Anderson told Alan Hubbard of UK newspaper The Independent, "When I went to Doncaster as a probation officer, I always remember at one point there were six inmates that I used to knock around with. There were a couple of them whose parents used to say 'don't mix with that Anderson because you'll get yourself into trouble'. It was ironic, there we were, all in prison together, but of course I was the one with the set of keys. I just think that in life I made better decisions than the people who are inside. I could quite easily not have done. God knows what I would have done if I hadn't found boxing."

Anderson's job as governor resulted in a reunion with his former sparring partner Naseem Hamed who spent part of his 15 months sentence for dangerous driving at the jail in 2006, of which he said: "We knew for a long time before it happened that there was a high possibility that Nas was going to end up here. It wasn't a shock, it wasn't a surprise, it was just very sad".

Anderson was appointed as director of Her Majesty's Prison and Young Offenders Institute Ashfield in 2009. Between 2009 and leaving in 2013 the institution underwent significant change and challenges including a 50% increase in prison population. Inspections found issues with increased use of restraint and high incidence of strip-searching, and identified fights among inmates as an issue, but also praised progress in education and training, care and management of looked-after children, family support, control of substance abuse and the quality of accommodation. The Ministry of Justice announced in early 2013 that Ashfield would be decommissioned as a Youth Offending Institution and re-roled as an adult-only prison. Anderson left his role in March 2013, becoming director of HMP Lowdham Grange.
