= Deutschlandhalle =

Architectural structure

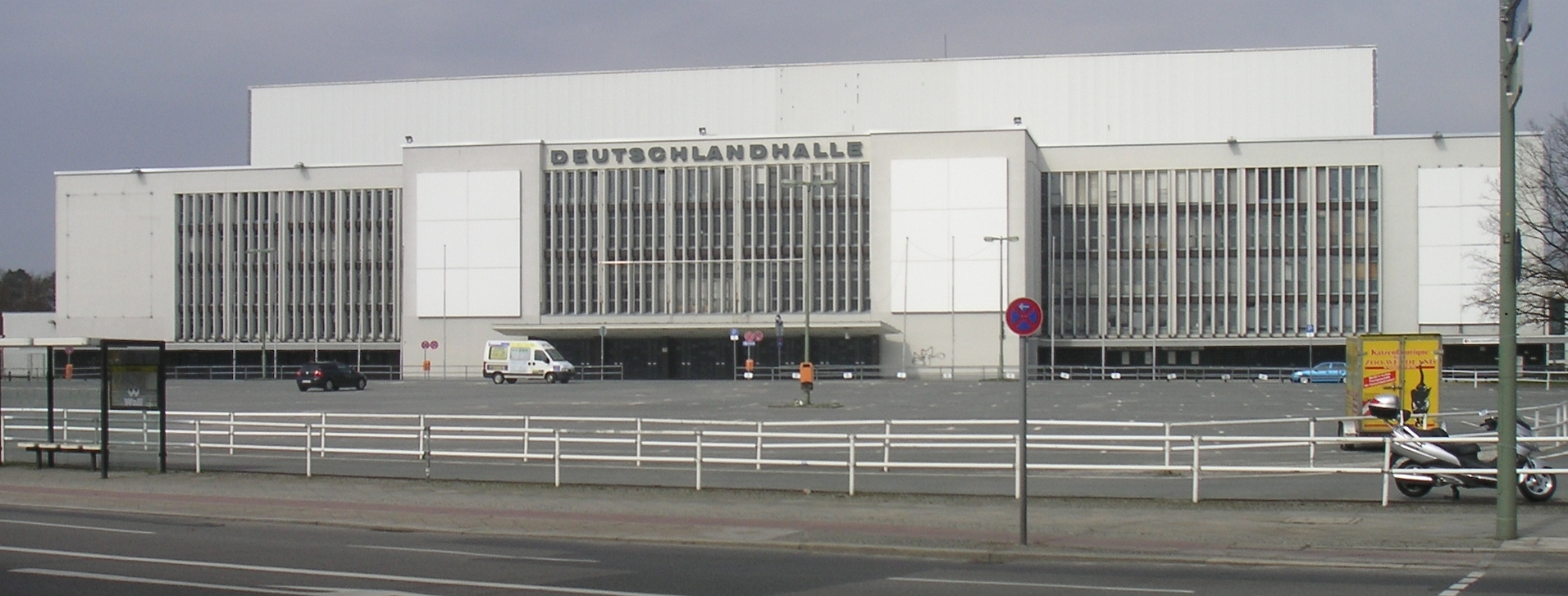
- Interactive map of Deutschlandhalle
- Location: Messedamm 26; 14055 Westend, Berlin
- Coordinates: 52°30′01″N 13°16′11″E
- Owner: Government of Berlin
- Operator: Messe Berlin GmbH
- Capacity: Ice hockey: 8,630; Concerts: 10,000

Construction
- Opened: 29 November 1935
- Closed: 27 April 2009
- Demolished: 3 December 2011
- Architects: Franz Ohrtmann; Fritz Wiemer

Tenants
- BSC Preussen (2001–2004); ECC Preussen Juniors Berlin (2006–2009)

Deutschlandhalle was an arena located in the Westend neighbourhood of Berlin, Germany. It was inaugurated on 29 November 1935 by Adolf Hitler. The building was granted landmark status in 1995, but was demolished on 3 December 2011.

== History ==
Built primarily for the 1936 Summer Olympics, the Deutschlandhalle could hold 8,764 people. The Olympic boxing, weightlifting and wrestling competitions took place here. On 19 February 1938 test pilot Hanna Reitsch demonstrated the first indoor flight in the arena with a Focke-Wulf Fw 61 helicopter.

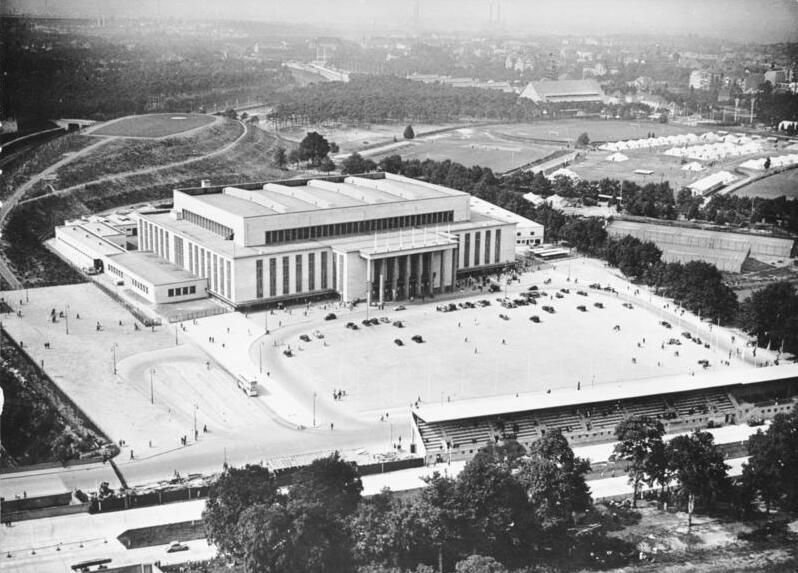
Deutschlandhalle in 1939, in the foreground terrace of the AVUS race track

Heavily damaged by air raids in 1943, the Deutschlandhalle was rebuilt after World War II and from 1957 served as a multi purpose arena and sports venue, in the last years primarily for ice hockey, but also for indoor football and again for boxing.

After the 1990 German reunification, the Deutschlandhalle lost its position as Berlin's primary arena, replaced by the newly erected Velodrom, Max-Schmeling-Halle and Uber Arena. In 1998 it was closed but in 2001 was reopened again as an ice hockey venue for BSC Preussen, who needed a new home venue after their old venue, Eisstadion an der Jafféstraße, had been demolished. Preussen used it as their home venue until 2009 when it was finally closed.

Destruction of the roof during the demolition

After the building had to be closed for repairs several times, the Berlin Senate in May 2008 decided to demolish it. Demolition took place on 3 December 2011 with the explosive destruction of the roof.

A new exhibition and congress hall, named "CityCube Berlin", would be built on the site of the Deutschlandhalle; It opened on 5 May 2014.

== Events ==
The arena hosted the 1980 FIBA European Champions Cup final between Maccabi Tel Aviv and Real Madrid, in which Madrid won 89–85, the 1995 FIBA Korać Cup finals in which local Alba Berlin won the trophy, and the 1995 World Amateur Boxing Championships.

On February 26, 1997, the World Wrestling Federation held a taping of Monday Night Raw at the arena (aired on March 3, 1997) as well as of Shotgun Saturday Night and Superstars.

The building has also been used for musical events: as part of her À travers l'Europe Tour, in 1959 Dalida had a sold-out concert in front of audience of 9,500. Ella Fitzgerald performed here in 1960; the concert was recorded as Ella in Berlin. On 4 September 1970, it was the site of Jimi Hendrix's penultimate performance. On October 19, 1973, the Rolling Stones performed their last concert with guitarist Mick Taylor as a steady member of the group. Frank Zappa performed there on February 15, 1978, two guitar solos of which show he released as instrumental tracks on his acclaimed Sheik Yerbouti album. Zappa again performed at the venue during his 1988 Broadway the Hard Way tour.

On 30 November 1980, Queen performed a concert in the Deutschlandhalle.

The 1981 film Christiane F. shows a performance by David Bowie in the Deutschlandhalle (this scene consists of footage of crowds at an unrelated AC/DC concert in the Deutschlandhalle interspersed with studio scenes featuring Bowie).

Preceded by Palais des Sports; Grenoble	FIBA European Champions Cup; Final Venue; 1980	Succeeded by Rhénus Sport; Strasbourg
