= José Luis Espinosa =

José Luis Espinosa may refer to:

- José Luis Espinosa (footballer) (1913–1975), Spanish football goalkeeper and manager
- José Luis Espinosa (boxer) (born 1941), Mexican boxer
- José Luis Espinosa Piña (born 1968), Mexican politician
- José Luis Espinosa Arroyo (born 1991), known as Tiri', Spanish football centre-back

== See also ==
- José Espinosa (disambiguation)
- José Espinoza (disambiguation)
