= Crazy Nights World Tour =

1987–1988 concert tour by Kiss

- Tour by Kiss
- Tour program cover
- Associated album: Crazy Nights
- Start date: November 13, 1987
- End date: October 4, 1988
- Legs: 4
- No. of shows: 129

Kiss concert chronology
- Asylum Tour (1985–1986); Crazy Nights World Tour (1987–1988); Hot in the Shade Tour (1990)

The Crazy Nights World Tour was a concert tour by American hard rock band Kiss in support of their fourteenth studio album Crazy Nights.

== Background ==
Based on how successful the single "Crazy Crazy Nights" was in the United Kingdom, the group had performed on the Monsters of Rock Festival at Castle Donington in England, performing alongside Guns N' Roses, David Lee Roth, Iron Maiden and Megadeth. Simmons was set to audition as a villain in the 1989 film Licence to Kill but had dropped out from auditioning, citing commitments to the band touring in Europe.

In the tour program for the band's final tour, Stanley reflected on the tour:

My only concern on stage is me and the audience. It doesn't take a lot of prodding or a lot of reaction from an audience to remind me, if I ever need it, of why I'm there and what my responsibility is. When someone pays to see you, they're not paying for a glimpse of what's going on in your personal life or what's going on with your health, if you can't deliver the goods, you have every business to cancel the show. There is no excuse for showing up and making excuses. If you want to make excuses at a show you should also be giving back money.

== Reception ==
Garth Trimble, a reporter from the Spokane Daily Chronicle who had attended the performance in Spokane, had opened his review with a headline that the band had 'staged a circus, but lacked excitement'. He noted on the set design being simple as well as the members performing well, but not outstanding. He however, noted that the show had lacked an explosive energy, and had noted on the awful sound of the Coliseum, which he stated was typical. In a closing statement, he said that the group's music wasn't strong enough to carry a show on its own, stating that it was perhaps time for the members to grow up.

Aaron Roberts, a staff writer from the Observer-Reporter, had attended the Pittsburgh performance, gave the show a positive review. He opened by stating that the band had thrilled the audience with a blend of both classic and new songs. He praised Kulick on his speed and skill during his guitar solo as well as stating how equally impressed he was on Carr's drum solo. He noted on the audience being a blend of teenagers and young adults, who previously got into Kiss as teens - citing their reactions that it didn't matter that 'only half of the original group' was performing the classic songs, as well as the cheers and the 'glow of hundreds of lighters' to bring the band back on stage for an encore.

== Set lists ==
These are example set lists for what was played at a show, and may not represent the majority of shows on the tour.

1987 North American Set list

1. "Love Gun"
2. "Cold Gin"
3. "Bang Bang You"
4. "Fits Like a Glove"
5. "Crazy Crazy Nights"
6. "No, No, No"
7. "War Machine"
8. "Reason to Live"
9. "Heaven's on Fire"
10. "I Love It Loud"
11. "Lick It Up"
12. "Rock and Roll All Nite"

Encore

13. "Tears Are Falling"
14. "Detroit Rock City"

1988 North American Set list

1. "Love Gun"
2. "Cold Gin"
3. "Bang Bang You"
4. "Fits Like a Glove"
5. "Crazy Crazy Nights"
6. "War Machine"
7. "Reason to Live"
8. "Heaven's on Fire"
9. "I Love It Loud"
10. "Lick It Up"
11. "Shout It Out Loud"

Encore

12. "Rock and Roll All Nite"
13. "Tears Are Falling"
14. "Detroit Rock City"

Japanese Set list

1. "Love Gun"
2. "Cold Gin"
3. "Bang Bang You"
4. "Calling Dr. Love"
5. "Fits Like a Glove"
6. "Crazy Crazy Nights"
7. "No, No, No"
8. "Reason to Live"
9. "Heaven's on Fire"
10. "War Machine"
11. "Tears Are Falling"
12. "I Love It Loud"
13. "Lick It Up"
14. "Black Diamond"
15. "I Was Made for Lovin' You"
16. "Shout It Out Loud"

Encore

17. "Strutter"
18. "Rock and Roll All Nite"
19. "Detroit Rock City"

European Set list

1. "Love Gun"
2. "Fits Like a Glove"
3. "Heaven's on Fire"
4. "Cold Gin"
5. "Black Diamond"
6. "Bang Bang You"
7. "No, No, No"
8. "Firehouse"
9. "Crazy Crazy Nights"
10. "I Was Made for Lovin' You"
11. "Deuce"
12. "Reason to Live"
13. "Tears Are Falling"
14. "I Love It Loud"
15. "Strutter"
16. "Shout It Out Loud"

Encore

17. "Lick It Up"
18. "Rock and Roll All Nite"
19. "Detroit Rock City"

== Tour dates ==
Date	City	Country	Venue	Opening Act(s)
North America
November 13, 1987	Jackson	United States	Mississippi Coliseum	White Lion
November 14, 1987	Pensacola	United States	Pensacola Civic Center	White Lion
November 15, 1987	Memphis	United States	Mid-South Coliseum	White Lion
November 20, 1987	Belton	United States	Bell County Expo Center	White Lion
November 21, 1987	Lubbock	United States	Lubbock Municipal Coliseum	White Lion
November 22, 1987	Valley Center	United States	Britt Brown Arena	White Lion
November 24, 1987	Tulsa	United States	Expo Square Pavilion	White Lion
November 25, 1987	Norman	United States	Lloyd Noble Center	White Lion
November 26, 1987	Topeka	United States	Landon Arena	White Lion
November 27, 1987	Omaha	United States	Omaha Civic Auditorium	White Lion
November 28, 1987	Davenport	United States	Palmer Auditorium	White Lion
December 1, 1987	Saint Paul	United States	St. Paul Civic Center	White Lion
December 2, 1987	Rochester	United States	Mayo Civic Center	White Lion
December 4, 1987	Des Moines	United States	Iowa Veterans Memorial Auditorium	White Lion
December 6, 1987	Springfield	United States	Prairie Capital Convention Center	White Lion
December 7, 1987	Toledo	United States	Toledo Sports Arena	White Lion
December 9, 1987	Erie	United States	Erie Civic Center	Ted Nugent
December 10, 1987	Toronto	Canada	Maple Leaf Gardens	Ted Nugent
December 11, 1987	Glens Falls	United States	Glens Falls Civic Center	Ted Nugent
December 12, 1987	Providence	United States	Providence Civic Center	Ted Nugent
December 13, 1987	Portland	United States	Cumberland County Civic Center	Ted Nugent
December 18, 1987	Philadelphia	United States	The Spectrum	Ted Nugent
December 19, 1987	New Haven	United States	New Haven Coliseum	Ted Nugent
December 20, 1987	East Rutherford	United States	Brendan Byrne Arena	Ted Nugent
December 26, 1987	Fort Wayne	United States	Allen County War Memorial Coliseum	Ted Nugent
December 27, 1987	Indianapolis	United States	Market Square Arena	Ted Nugent
December 29, 1987	Louisville	United States	Freedom Hall	Ted Nugent
December 30, 1987	Evansville	United States	Roberts Municipal Stadium	Ted Nugent
December 31, 1987	Trotwood	United States	Hara Arena	Chastain
January 1, 1988	Johnson City	United States	Freedom Hall Civic Center	Ted Nugent
January 2, 1988	Knoxville	United States	Knoxville Civic Coliseum	Ted Nugent
January 5, 1988	Marquette	United States	Lakeview Arena	Ted Nugent
January 6, 1988	Green Bay	United States	Brown County Veterans Memorial Arena	Ted Nugent
January 7, 1988	Milwaukee	United States	MECCA Arena	Ted Nugent
January 8, 1988	Chicago	United States	UIC Pavilion	Ted Nugent
January 9, 1988	St. Louis	United States	Kiel Auditorium	Ted Nugent
January 11, 1988	Muskegon	United States	L. C. Walker Arena	Ted Nugent
January 12, 1988	Saginaw	United States	Saginaw Civic Center	Ted Nugent
January 13, 1988	Columbus	United States	Battelle Hall	Ted Nugent
January 15, 1988	Richfield	United States	Richfield Coliseum	Ted Nugent
January 16, 1988	Pittsburgh	United States	Civic Arena	Ted Nugent
January 17, 1988	Detroit	United States	Cobo Arena	Helix
January 18, 1988	Huntington	United States	Huntington Civic Center	Ted Nugent
January 20, 1988	Norfolk	United States	Norfolk Scope	Ted Nugent
January 22, 1988	Utica	United States	Utica Memorial Auditorium	Ted Nugent
January 23, 1988	Johnstown	United States	Cambria County War Memorial Arena	Ted Nugent
January 24, 1988	Buffalo	United States	Buffalo Memorial Auditorium	Ted Nugent
January 26, 1988	Poughkeepsie	United States	Mid-Hudson Civic Center	Ted Nugent
January 27, 1988	Worcester	United States	Centrum in Worcester	Ted Nugent
January 28, 1988	Springfield	United States	Springfield Civic Center	Ted Nugent
January 29, 1988	Uniondale	United States	Nassau Veterans Memorial Coliseum	Ted Nugent
January 30, 1988	Rochester	United States	Rochester Community War Memorial	Ted Nugent
February 1, 1988	Landover	United States	Capital Centre	Ted Nugent
February 3, 1988	Greenville	United States	Greenville Memorial Auditorium	Ted Nugent
February 4, 1988	Savannah	United States	Savannah Civic Center	Ted Nugent
February 5, 1988	Greensboro	United States	Greensboro Coliseum	Ted Nugent
February 6, 1988	Fayetteville	United States	Cumberland County Memorial Arena	Ted Nugent
February 7, 1988	Charlotte	United States	Charlotte Coliseum	Ted Nugent
February 9, 1988	Nashville	United States	Nashville Municipal Auditorium	Ted Nugent
February 10, 1988	Atlanta	United States	The Omni Coliseum	Ted Nugent
February 12, 1988	Pembroke Pines	United States	Hollywood Sportatorium	Ted Nugent
February 13, 1988	St. Petersburg	United States	Bayfront Center	Ted Nugent
February 14, 1988	Jacksonville	United States	Jacksonville Memorial Coliseum	Ted Nugent
February 15, 1988	Columbus	United States	Columbus Municipal Auditorium	Ted Nugent
February 16, 1988	Columbia	United States	Carolina Coliseum	Ted Nugent
February 18, 1988	Terre Haute	United States	Hulman Center	Ted Nugent
February 19, 1988	Dubuque	United States	Five Flags Center	Ted Nugent
February 20, 1988	Kansas City	United States	Kansas City Municipal Auditorium	Ted Nugent
February 21, 1988	Little Rock	United States	Barton Coliseum	Ted Nugent
February 23, 1988	New Orleans	United States	Kiefer UNO Lakefront Arena	Ted Nugent
February 24, 1988	Houston	United States	The Summit	Ted Nugent
February 25, 1988	San Antonio	United States	HemisFair Arena	Ted Nugent
February 26, 1988	Austin	United States	Frank Erwin Center	Ted Nugent
February 27, 1988	Fort Worth	United States	Tarrant County Convention Center	Ted Nugent
March 1, 1988	Madison	United States	Dane County Expo Coliseum	Anthrax
March 2, 1988	Merrillville	United States	Holiday Star Theatre	Anthrax
March 3, 1988	Peoria	United States	Peoria Civic Center	Anthrax
March 5, 1988	Winnipeg	Canada	Winnipeg Arena	Anthrax
March 8, 1988	Edmonton	Canada	Northlands Coliseum	Anthrax
March 9, 1988	Calgary	Canada	Olympic Saddledome	Anthrax
March 11, 1988	Vancouver	Canada	Pacific Coliseum	Anthrax
March 13, 1988	Medford	United States	Jackson County Expo Hall	Anthrax
March 14, 1988	Portland	United States	Portland Memorial Coliseum	Anthrax
March 15, 1988	Spokane	United States	Spokane Coliseum	Anthrax
March 17, 1988	Seattle	United States	Seattle Center Coliseum	Anthrax
March 19, 1988	Rapid City	United States	Rushmore Plaza Civic Center	Anthrax
March 20, 1988	Casper	United States	Casper Events Center	Anthrax
March 21, 1988	Salt Lake City	United States	Salt Palace	Anthrax
March 23, 1988	Denver	United States	McNichols Sports Arena	Anthrax
March 25, 1988	Chandler	United States	Compton Terrace	Anthrax
March 26, 1988	Costa Mesa	United States	Pacific Amphitheatre	Anthrax
March 28, 1988	Sacramento	United States	ARCO Arena	Anthrax
March 30, 1988	San Francisco	United States	Bill Graham Civic Auditorium	Anthrax
April 1, 1988	San Diego	United States	San Diego Sports Arena	Anthrax
April 2, 1988	Las Vegas	United States	Thomas & Mack Center	Anthrax
Japan
April 16, 1988	Nagoya	Japan	Nagoya Civic Assembly Hall	—
April 18, 1988	Osaka	Japan	Festival Hall	—
April 20, 1988	Yokohama	Japan	Yokohama Cultural Gymnasium	—
April 21, 1988	Tokyo	Japan	Nippon Budokan	—
April 22, 1988	Tokyo	Japan	Nippon Budokan	—
April 24, 1988	Tokyo	Japan	Yoyogi National Gymnasium	—
North America
July 4, 1988	Swanzey	United States	Cheshire Fairgrounds	Dirty Looks; Balaam and the Angel; Mantis
August 12, 1988	New York City	United States	The Ritz	Dirty Looks
August 13, 1988	New York City	United States	The Ritz	Dirty Looks
Europe
August 16, 1988	London	England	Marquee Club	—
August 20, 1988	Donington	England	Donington Park	—
August 27, 1988	Schweinfurt	West Germany	Mainweisen	—
August 28, 1988	Bochum	West Germany	Ruhrstadion	—
August 30, 1988	Reykjavík	Iceland	Reiðhöllin	Foringjamir
September 2, 1988	Budapest	Hungary	Kisstadion	Edda
September 4, 1988	Tilburg	Netherlands	Willem II Stadion	—
September 10, 1988	Modena	Italy	Festa de l'Unità	—
September 13, 1988	Paris	France	Zénith de Paris	Kings of the Sun
September 15, 1988	Copenhagen	Denmark	K.B. Hallen	Kings of the Sun
September 16, 1988	Gothenburg	Sweden	Frölundaborg	Kings of the Sun
September 17, 1988	Stockholm	Sweden	Johanneshovs Isstadion	Kings of the Sun
September 19, 1988	Helsinki	Finland	Helsinki Ice Hall	Kings of the Sun
September 21, 1988	Lillestrøm	Norway	Skedsmohallen	Kings of the Sun
September 24, 1988	London	England	Wembley Arena	Kings of the Sun
September 25, 1988	London	England	Wembley Arena	Kings of the Sun
September 26, 1988	Birmingham	England	NEC Arena	Kings of the Sun
September 27, 1988	Birmingham	England	NEC Arena	Kings of the Sun
September 28, 1988	Bradford	England	St. George's Hall	Kings of the Sun
September 29, 1988	Newcastle upon Tyne	England	Newcastle City Hall	Kings of the Sun
October 1, 1988	Edinburgh	Scotland	Edinburgh Playhouse	Kings of the Sun
October 2, 1988	Edinburgh	Scotland	Edinburgh Playhouse	Kings of the Sun
October 4, 1988	Belfast	Northern Ireland	King's Hall	Kings of the Sun

=== Cancelled dates ===
Date	City	Country	Venue	Reason
November 17, 1987	Lake Charles	United States	Lake Charles Civic Center	Low ticket sales
November 18, 1987	Corpus Christi	United States	Corpus Christi Memorial Coliseum	Low ticket sales
December 16, 1987	Syracuse	United States	Onondaga County War Memorial	Snow storm

=== Box office score data ===
List of box office score data with date, city, venue, attendance, gross, references
Date (1987)	City	Venue	Attendance	Gross	Ref(s)
December 10	Toronto, Canada	Maple Leaf Gardens	8,832 / 10,000	$152,979	
December 12	Providence, United States	Civic Center	10,106 / 12,300	$166,749	

== Personnel ==
- Paul Stanley – vocals, rhythm guitar
- Gene Simmons – vocals, bass
- Eric Carr – drums, vocals
- Bruce Kulick – lead guitar, keyboards, backing vocals

Additional musician

- Gary Corbett – keyboards
