= Crazy Nights (disambiguation) =

Crazy Nights is a 1987 album by Kiss.

- Crazy Nights Tour, a concert tour by Kiss
- "Crazy Crazy Nights", a 1987 song by Kiss from the album
- Crazy Nights (video), a music VHS by Kiss

Crazy Nights may also refer to:

- Crazy Nights (Tygers of Pan Tang album), a 1982 album by Tygers of Pan Tang
- Crazy Nights (Lonestar album), a 1997 album by Lonestar
- "Crazy Night", a song by Loudness from the album Thunder in the East
- "Crazy Nights", a song by 3 Inches of Blood on their album Advance and Vanquish
