= Boxing at the 1972 Summer Olympics – Middleweight =

Olympic boxing tournament

Middleweight boxing at the Games of the XX Olympiad
- Venue: Boxing Hall, Munich
- Dates: 29 August – 10 September 1972
- Competitors: 22 from 22 nations

Medalists
1st place, gold medalist(s)		Vyacheslav Lemeshev	Soviet Union
2nd place, silver medalist(s)		Reima Virtanen	Finland
3rd place, bronze medalist(s)		Prince Amartey	Ghana
3rd place, bronze medalist(s)		Marvin Johnson	United States

The men's middleweight event was part of the boxing programme at the 1972 Summer Olympics. The weight class allowed boxers of up to 75 kilograms to compete. The competition was held from 29 August to 10 September 1972. 22 boxers from 22 nations competed.

== Medalists ==
Gold	Vyacheslav Lemeshev; Soviet Union
Silver	Reima Virtanen; Finland
Bronze	Prince Amartey; Ghana
Bronze	Marvin Johnson; United States

== Results ==
The following boxers took part in the event:

Rank	Name	Country
1	Vyacheslav Lemeshev	Soviet Union
2	Reima Virtanen	Finland
3T	Prince Amartey	Ghana
3T	Marvin Johnson	United States
5T	Witold Stachurski	Poland
5T	Poul Knudsen	Denmark
5T	Alejandro Montoya	Cuba
5T	Nazif Kuran	Turkey
9T	Titus Simba	Tanzania
9T	Peter Dula	Kenya
9T	José Luis Espinosa	Mexico
9T	William Peets	Virgin Islands
9T	Ewald Jarmer	West Germany
9T	Bill Knight	Great Britain
9T	Hans-Joachim Brauske	East Germany
9T	Nat Knowles	Bahamas
17T	Alec Năstac	Romania
17T	Julius Luipa	Zambia
17T	Abdel Wahab Abdullah Salih	Sudan
17T	Wiem Gommies	Indonesia
17T	Athanasios Giannopoulos	Greece
17T	Faustino Quinales	Venezuela

=== First round ===
- Alejandro Montoya (CUB) def. Alec Năstac (ROU), KO-1
- Bill Knight (GBR) def. Julius Luipa (ZAM), 3:2
- Hans-Joachim Brauske (GDR) def. Abdalla Abdelwahb Salih (SUD), 3:2
- Vyacheslav Lemeshev (URS) def. William Gomnies (INA), KO-1
- Nazif Kuran (TUR) def. Athanasios Giannopoulos (GRE), TKO-2
- Nathaniel Knowles (BAH) def. Faustino Quinales (VEN), TKO-1

=== Second round ===
- Reima Virtanen (FIN) def. Titus Simba (TNZ), 3:2
- Witold Stachurski (POL) def. Peter Dula (KEN), 4:1
- Prince Amartey (GHA) def. José Luis Espinosa (MEX), 5:0
- Poul Knudsen (DEN) def. William Peets (VIS), 5:0
- Marvin Johnson (USA) def. Ewald Jarmer (FRG), 5:0
- Alejandro Montoya (CUB) def. Bill Knight (GBR), TKO-2
- Vyacheslav Lemeshev (URS) def. Hans-Joachim Brauske (GDR), 5:0
- Nazif Kuran (TUR) def. Nathaniel Knowles (BAH), KO-1

=== Quarterfinals ===
- Reima Virtanen (FIN) def. Witold Stachurski (POL), TKO-3
- Prince Amartey (GHA) def. Poul Knudsen (DEN), 3:2
- Marvin Johnson (USA) def. Alejandro Montoya (CUB), 5:0
- Vyacheslav Lemeshev (URS) def. Nazif Kuran (TUR), TKO-2

=== Semifinals ===
- Reima Virtanen (FIN) def. Prince Amartey (GHA), 3:2
- Vyacheslav Lemeshev (URS) def. Marvin Johnson (USA), TKO-2

=== Final ===
- Vyacheslav Lemeshev (URS) def. Reima Virtanen (FIN), KO-1
