= Vyacheslav Lemeshev =

Russian boxer (1952–1996)

Medal record

Men's Boxing

Representing the Soviet Union

Olympic Games
Gold medal – first place	1972 Munich	Middleweight

European Amateur Championships
Gold medal – first place	1973 Belgrade	Middleweight
Gold medal – first place	1975 Katowice	Middleweight

Vyacheslav Ivanovich Lemeshev (Russian: Вячеслав Иванович Лемешев) (April 3, 1952 in Moscow — January 27, 1996) was an Olympic boxer from the USSR. Soviet physiologists, while examining Lemeshev abilities with electronic measuring devices, discovered his extremely fast, split-second reaction, uncommon not only for boxers, but for the other athletes as well, and decisive when it comes to the counterpunches and cross-counters, in which he was one of the best in the entire middleweight, though severe trauma of the left hand (Lemeshev was a southpaw) ended his olympic career, and boxing career as well, when resulted in several knockout losses in a row.

== Career ==
Lemeshev trained at the Armed Forces sports society in Moscow. During his career Lemeshev won 103 fights out of 111. He won the gold medal in the middleweight division (–75 kg) at the 1972 Summer Olympics in Munich. Lemeshev knocked out four of his five opponents to win the gold medal. He knocked out young American Marvin Johnson in two rounds in a semifinal, avenging an earlier loss to Johnson in the Soviet Union. He then scored a 1st round knockout (Time 2:17) over Reima Virtanen of Finland to win the gold medal. He also won European Championships in 1973 and 1975 and 1974 USSR Championship. He became the Honoured Master of Sports of the USSR in 1972 and was awarded the Order of the Badge of Honor in the same year.

== 1972 Olympic results ==
- Round of 32: Defeated Wiem Gommies (Indonesia) KO 1
- Round of 16: Defeated Hans-Joachim Brauske (East Germany) by decision, 5-0
- Quarterfinal: Defeated Nazif Kuran (Turkey) TKO 2
- Semifinal: Defeated Marvin Johnson (United States) TKO 2
- Final: Defeated Reima Virtanen (Finland) KO 1 (won gold medal)
