= José Espinosa =

José Espinosa may refer to:

- José Luis Espinosa, Mexican boxer
- José Roberto Espinosa, Mexican commentator for American football
- José Rangel Espinosa, Mexican politician
- José Martín Espinosa de los Monteros, Spanish pilot and mathematics professor
- José Luis Espinosa Piña, Mexican politician
- José Miguel Espinosa, Spanish swimmer

== See also ==
- José Espinoza (disambiguation)
