= Rozstání =

Rozstání may refer to places in the Czech Republic:

- Rozstání (Prostějov District), a municipality and village in the Olomouc Region
- Rozstání (Svitavy District), a municipality and village in the Pardubice Region
- Rozstání (Světlá pod Ještědem), a village and part of Světlá pod Ještědem in the Liberec Region
