= Reima Virtanen =

Finnish boxer

Personal information
- Born: 5 November 1947 (age 78)
Medal record
Men's Boxing
Representing Finland
Olympic Games
Silver medal – second place	1972 Munich	Middleweight
European Amateur Championships
Bronze medal – third place	1969 Bucharest	Middleweight
Bronze medal – third place	1971 Madrid	Middleweight

Reima Valdemar Virtanen (born 5 November 1947 in Kemi, Finnish Lapland) is a former boxer from Finland, who won the silver medal in the middleweight division (– 75 kg) at the 1972 Summer Olympics in Munich. He was nicknamed "Kila" and "Rema" during his career. In the final Virtanen was knocked out in 2:17 of the first round by Vyacheslav Lemechev of the Soviet Union.

== Olympic results ==
- 1st round bye
- Defeated Titus Simba (Tanzania) 3–2
- Defeated Witold Stachurski (Poland) TKO 3
- Defeated Prince Amartey (Ghana) 3–2
- Lost to Vyacheslav Lemeshev (Soviet Union) KO by 1
