= Leslie Stewart =

Trinidad and Tobago boxer

Personal information
- Nickname: Laventille Tiger
- Nationality: (Trinidad and Tobago) Trinidadian
- Born: Leslie Matthew Stewart; 26 March 1961 (age 65) Laventille, Trinidad
- Height: 6 ft 1 1/2 in (187 cm)
- Weight: Light heavyweight; Cruiserweight

Boxing career
- Reach: 74 in (188 cm)
- Stance: Orthodox

Boxing record
- Total fights: 43
- Wins: 31
- Win by KO: 20
- Losses: 12

Leslie Matthew Stewart (born 21 March 1961) is a retired Trinidadian boxer. A former world champion and two-time world title challenger, Stewart held the WBA light heavyweight title in 1987.

== Professional career ==
Known as "Laventille Tiger", Stewart turned professional in 1982 and challenged for the vacant WBA Light Heavyweight Title in 1986, but was TKO'd by Marvin Johnson when the bout was stopped on cuts. In the rematch the following year, Stewart dominated Johnson, and Johnson's corner retired the fighter in the ninth round. Stewart lost the belt in his first defense to Virgil Hill. In 1988 he challenged WBC Light Heavyweight Title holder Donny Lalonde, but lost via TKO. In 1989 he took on WBO Light Heavyweight Title holder Michael Moorer, but again lost via TKO. He retired in 2000 after bouts of inactivity in the 1990s.

== Professional boxing record ==
43 fights	31 wins	12 losses
By knockout	20	6
By decision	11	6

Result	Record	Opponent	Type	Round, time	Date	Location	Notes
Loss	31–12	(United States) Billy Lewis	UD	10 (10)	15 January 2000	(United States) Radio City Music Hall, New York	
Loss	31–11	(Canada) Dale Brown	UD	12 (12)	28 May 1998	(United States) Westchester County Center, White Plains	NABF Cruiserweight Title.
Loss	31–10	(France) Fabrice Tiozzo	KO	6 (10)	4 May 1996	(France) Villeurbanne	
Win	31–9	(United States) Tyrone Bledsoe	KO	1 (8)	17 October 1995	(United States) Indiana Farmers Coliseum	
Win	30–9	(United States) Ken McCurdy	TKO	3 (8)	18 August 1995	(United States) Aladdin Hotel & Casino, Las Vegas	
Loss	29–9	(Germany) Henry Maske	KO	7 (10)	6 March 1992	Germany	
Loss	29–8	(Australia) Guy Waters	SD	12 (12)	13 September 1991	(Australia) International Tennis Centre, Melbourne	Commonwealth Light Heavyweight Title.
Loss	29–7	(Puerto Rico) Esteban Pizzarro	PTS	10 (10)	7 August 1991	(Puerto Rico) San Juan	
Win	29–6	(United States) Bobby Jennings	PTS	8 (8)	12 April 1991	(United States) Jacksonville	
Win	28–6	(Malawi) Drake Thadzi	UD	10 (10)	28 February 1991	(Canada) Halifax Forum Multi-Purpose Centre, Halifax	
Loss	27–6	(United States) Anthony Hembrick	UD	10 (10)	9 November 1990	(United States) Diplomat Hotel, Hollywood	
Loss	27–5	(United States) Michael Moorer	TKO	8 (12)	25 June 1989	(United States) Convention Center, Atlantic City	WBO Light Heavyweight Title.
Win	27–4	(United States) Phil Brown	SD	8 (8)	22 April 1989	(United States) The Palace, Auburn Hills	
Loss	26–4	(United States) Bobby Czyz	SD	10 (10)	25 October 1988	(United States) Resorts International, Atlantic City	
Loss	26–3	(Canada) Donny Lalonde	TKO	5 (12)	29 May 1988	(Trinidad and Tobago) National Stadium, Port-of-Spain	WBC Light Heavyweight Title.
Win	26–2	(United States) Charlie Dean Moore	TKO	9 (10)	18 March 1988	(United States) James Knight Convention Center, Miami	
Win	25–2	(United States) Dawud Shaw	TKO	4 (10)	27 November 1987	(Trinidad and Tobago) National Stadium, Port-of-Spain	
Loss	24–2	(United States) Virgil Hill	TKO	4 (12)	5 September 1987	(United States) Trump Plaza Hotel, Atlantic City	WBA Light Heavyweight Title.
Win	24–1	(United States) Marvin Johnson	RTD	8 (12)	23 May 1987	(Trinidad and Tobago) National Stadium, Port-of-Spain	WBA Light Heavyweight Title.
Win	23–1	(United States) Bobby Thomas	TKO	5 (10)	20 March 1987	(Trinidad and Tobago) Jean Pierre Sports Complex, Mucurapo	
Win	22–1	(Venezuela) Fulgencio Obelmejias	TKO	4 (12)	16 November 1986	(Trinidad and Tobago) Jean Pierre Sports Complex, Mucurapo	WBA Fedelatin Light Heavyweight Title.
Win	21–1	(Australia) Gary Hubble	KO	5 (12)	18 September 1986	(Australia) State Sports Centre, Sydney	Commonwealth Light Heavyweight Title.
Win	20–1	(United States) James Salerno	UD	10 (10)	29 July 1986	(United States) Florida State Fairgrounds Hall, Tampa	
Win	19–1	(Jamaica) Uriah Grant	PTS	8 (8)	6 May 1986	(United States) Harrah's Marina Hotel Casino, Atlantic City	
Loss	18–1	(United States) Marvin Johnson	TKO	7 (15)	9 February 1986	(United States) Market Square Arena, Indianapolis	WBA Light Heavyweight Title.
Win	18–0	(Zambia) Lottie Mwale	PTS	12 (12)	4 August 1985	(Trinidad and Tobago) Port-of-Spain	Commonwealth Light Heavyweight Title.
Win	17–0	(United States) Dennis Roberts	TKO	1 (10)	12 July 1985	(United States) Galt Ocean Mile Hotel, Fort Lauderdale	
Win	16–0	(Colombia) Tomas Polo Ruiz	KO	6 (10)	29 June 1985	(Trinidad and Tobago) Port-of-Spain	
Win	15–0	(United States) Chris Wells	TKO	6 (12)	10 May 1985	(United States) Galt Ocean Mile Hotel, Fort Lauderdale	WBC Contin. Americas/Florida Light Heavyweight Title.
Win	14–0	(United States) Mark Frazie	TKO	8 (12)	1 March 1985	(Trinidad and Tobago) Jean Pierre Sports Complex, Mucurapo	WBC Continental Americas Cruiserweight Title.
Win	13–0	(United States) James Salerno	PTS	10 (10)	10 November 1984	(United States) Jai Alai Fronton, Miami	Florida Light Heavyweight Title.
Win	12–0	(United States) Elvis Parks	TKO	9 (10)	28 September 1984	(United States) Convention Center, Miami Beach	
Win	11–0	(United States) Larry Lane	PTS	10 (10)	16 March 1984	(Trinidad and Tobago) Port-of-Spain	
Win	10–0	(United Kingdom) Tom Collins	PTS	10 (10)	16 December 1983	(Trinidad and Tobago) Port-of-Spain	
Win	9–0	(United States) Willie Taylor	PTS	10 (10)	11 November 1983	(Trinidad and Tobago) Port-of-Spain	
Win	8–0	(Uruguay) Carlos Flores Burlon	KO	4 (12)	11 September 1983	(Trinidad and Tobago) Port-of-Spain	Latin American Light Heavyweight Title.
Win	7–0	(United States) Leon McDonald	KO	1 (8)	12 May 1983	(Trinidad and Tobago) Port-of-Spain	
Win	6–0	(Curaçao) Hubert Zimmerman	KO	2 (8)	25 February 1983	(Trinidad and Tobago) Port-of-Spain	
Win	5–0	(Puerto Rico) Ricardo Richardson	KO	4 (8)	30 October 1982	(Trinidad and Tobago) Port-of-Spain	
Win	4–0	(United States) Gil Rosario	KO	9 (10)	30 July 1982	(Trinidad and Tobago) Port-of-Spain	
Win	3–0	(Curaçao) Easy Boy Michael	KO	2 (8)	14 May 1982	(Trinidad and Tobago) Jean Pierre Sports Complex, Mucurapo	
Win	2–0	(Trinidad and Tobago) Antoine Ashton	PTS	8 (8)	30 April 1982	(Trinidad and Tobago) Dansteele Gymnasium, Marabella	
Win	1–0	(Trinidad and Tobago) Michael Hospadales	TKO	4 (6)	29 January 1982	(Trinidad and Tobago) Port-of-Spain	

== See also ==
- List of light-heavyweight boxing champions

Achievements
Regional boxing titles
Vacant Title last held by Pat Cuillo	Florida light heavyweight champion 10 November 1984 – 23 May 1987; Won WBA title	Vacant Title next held by Uriah Grant
Preceded by Lottie Mwale	CBC light heavyweight champion 4 August 1985 – 23 May 1987; Won world title	Vacant Title next held by Gary Summerhays
Preceded by Fulgencio Obelmejias	WBA light heavyweight champion Fedalatin title 16 November 1986 – 23 May 1987; Won world title	Vacant Title next held by Sergio Merani
World boxing titles
Preceded by Marvin Johnson	WBA light heavyweight champion 23 May 1987 – 5 September 1987	Succeeded by Virgil Hill
