= Crazy Nights (video) =

Video by Kiss
- Released: June 6, 1988
- Genre: Glam metal

Kiss chronology
Exposed (1987)	Crazy Nights (1988)	X-treme Close-Up (1992)

Crazy Nights is a music VHS by American hard rock band Kiss. It features three videos from the album of the same name. It included the music videos for "Crazy Crazy Nights", "Turn on the Night" and "Reason to Live". It was certified Gold in the US.

== Track listing ==
No.	Title	Writer(s)	Length
1.	"Crazy Crazy Nights" (video)	Adam Mitchell, Paul Stanley
2.	"Turn on the Night" (video)	Stanley, Desmond Child
3.	"Reason to Live" (video)	Stanley, Diane Warren

== Certifications ==
Region	Certification	Certified units/sales
United States (RIAA)	Gold	50,000^{^}
^{^} Shipments figures based on certification alone.
