= Athanasios Giannopoulos =

Greek boxer (born 1947)

Personal information
- Nationality: Greek
- Born: 12 June 1947 (age 77)

Sport
- Sport: Boxing

Athanasios Giannopoulos (born 12 June 1947) is a Greek boxer. He competed in the men's middleweight event at the 1972 Summer Olympics. At the 1972 Summer Olympics, he lost in his first fight to Nazif Kuran of Turkey.
