= Faustino Quinales =

Venezuelan boxer (born 1947)

Personal information
- Nationality: Venezuelan
- Born: 12 February 1947 (age 79)

Sport
- Sport: Boxing
Medal record
Men's amateur boxing
Representing Venezuela
Pan American Games
| Gold medal – first place | 1971 Cali | Middleweight |

Faustino Quinales (born 12 February 1947) is a Venezuelan boxer. He competed in the men's middleweight event at the 1972 Summer Olympics. At the 1972 Summer Olympics, he lost to Nathaniel Knowles of the Bahamas.
