= Lottie Mwale =

Zambian boxer (1952–2005)

Personal information
- Nicknames: Gunduzani; Kaingo
- Nationality: (Zambia) Zambian
- Born: 14 April 1952 Kitwe, Northern Rhodesia
- Died: 18 October 2005 (aged 53) Lusaka
- Weight: Middleweight; Light Heavyweight; Cruiserweight

Boxing career
- Stance: Orthodox

Boxing record
- Total fights: 53
- Wins: 44
- Win by KO: 34
- Losses: 9
- Draws: 0
- No contests: 0

Lottie Mwale
Medal record

Representing Zambia

Men's Boxing

British Commonwealth Games
Gold medal – first place	1974 Christchurch	Light Middleweight

Lottie Mwale (14 April 1952 – 18 October 2005) was a Zambian male Light Heavyweight-class boxer who was Commonwealth and African Boxing Union champion for a period of six years. Mwale also won the World Boxing Council (WBC) International title after defeating Ray Acquaye of Ghana in eight rounds in Lusaka in December 1990.

== Early life ==
Mwale was born in Kitwe, Zambia (then Northern Rhodesia) on 14 April 1952. He grew up in Wusakile and went to Ndeke Primary School. He lived close to Scrivener Stadium, the home of Rhokana United and had a keen interest in football, playing as a goalkeeper in neighbourhood matches. He also exhibited musical ability by playing drums in his early teens, and harboured ambitions of making it in mainstream music. After taking up boxing for fun, his friends noticed his natural ability and talked him into taking it up seriously so he decided to put his hands to a different use.

His brother-in-law was professional boxer Jackson Mambwe who also played a role in luring Mwale into the boxing ring, giving him his initial coaching and encouraging him to continue with the sport. Mwale's mother was not happy with his chosen path but when she realized he had set his heart on a career in boxing, she gave in and started supporting him.

== Boxing career ==
Mwale began his career at Rhokana Amateur Boxing Club in Kitwe and first entered the ring when he was 16. He soon fell in love with the sport and by the time he joined Zambia Army-sponsored Green Buffaloes Boxing Club, he was already a formidable amateur boxer. He reigned as middleweight champion in East and Central Africa and was appointed captain of the Zambia national boxing team in 1973. That same year, Zambia's new golden boy, who would be known for some controversy during his career sparked off a row with officials during a triangular boxing tournament involving Zambia, Kenya and Zaire when he lost a fight against a Kenyan boxer and later claimed that he 'just didn't want to win.' An inquiry was almost instituted until Mwale apologised.

In January 1974, Mwale was part of Zambia's contingent to the 1974 Commonwealth Games in Christchurch, New Zealand as a light middleweight. He powered his way into the quarter-finals with a 102-second knockout over Cook Islander Nio Mare after which team Manager Archie Phiri said he was delighted with Mwale's performance but he would have liked the contest to last a bit longer in order to give Mwale 'a better work-out.' Mwale made it into the finals with a majority points decision over Englishman Robert Davies though he suffered an injury to his right hand. An x-ray revealed that the injury was a slight sprain and this brought a sigh of relief to the Zambian camp, paving the way for the clash with Scottish champion Alexander 'Cy' Harrison, a bout which Mwale predicted would be 'too easy.' And so it proved to be as Mwale outboxed his Scottish opponent to collect the light-middleweight gold medal on a unanimous points decision, becoming the first Zambian Sportsman to reach such an achievement. Afterwards, he declared that winning the gold medal was the proudest moment of his life and that though Harrison was a good boxer, he had the measure of him and had used his reach advantage. Frank Hendry, the Scottish boxing team Manager had no hesitation in summing up Mwale as 'the best operator at the Games.'

Many fight-goers predicted that Mwale had the potential and class to do well as a professional if he ever felt like dropping his amateur status but he took his time before taking this step. In May 1975, he won a gold medal during the East and Central African Amateur Boxing Championship in Lusaka, and the following year, Zambia dethroned world champions the United States in the International Council of Military Sports (CISM) Games and Mwale, fighting as a middleweight, was voted boxer of the tournament. He then talked of turning professional but shelved his plans due to his contract with the National Defence Force which was only due to end the following year.

Mwale turned professional in April 1977 under Scorpio Promotions, turning down a five-year contract in the United States of America saying he wanted to fight for the Commonwealth and African titles before thinking of something bigger, and hoped to move from middleweight to heavyweight division. His first professional bout was against Fanwell Mwanza in April 1977 whom he knocked out in 6 rounds and earned the right to face Julius Luipa for the national light-heavyweight title.

Mwale won over a lot of admirers and also inspired young Zambian sportsmen to succeed. He went by the nickname "Gunduzani" which means 'shake them' in his native language, and "Kaingo" meaning 'Leopard.' Although based in London, he drew large crowds whenever he fought at home and also boasted a punch called the NPPP, which stood for 'Nuclear Power-Packed Punch.' His lifestyle outside the ring also made headlines, as he loved to party and often moved with a large entourage of hangers-ons whom he generously bought drinks for.

He knocked out Luipa in the 6th round in Lusaka and two years later knocked out Commonwealth champion Gary Summerhays of Canada in the 10th round in Lusaka. Two months later, Mwale had the opportunity to spar with his idol Muhammad Ali in an exhibition bout at the Royal Albert Hall in London, to mark Ali's final retirement after which Ali predicted a great future for the Zambian. By this time, Mwale was being managed by Wilfred Sauerland and trained by George Francis. Later that year, he defeated African Boxing Union (ABU) champion Bagayuko Sounkalo of Mali to win the continental title and prepare himself for the World Boxing Council title fight. After 5 consecutive wins including three victories over Americans Fred Brown, Jesse Burnett and Ed Turner, Mwale won the right to challenge WBC light-heavyweight champion Matthew Saad Muhammad.

The two squared up on 28 November 1980 in San Diego with Mwale dominating the first two rounds only to waver in the third round and then he got knocked out in the fourth round, the first loss of his professional career. Afterwards, Mwale admitted that he had gotten careless after catching Muhammad with most of his shots in the first two rounds, and taking it for granted that his opponent would not last the distance. "I wanted to show that I could fight him but he proved to be stronger than me." He also dismissed suggestions that he lost because he was lighter than Muhammad and urged his fans to accept the defeat – "When you lose, you don't start talking rubbish. I am a boxer and I lost. There are no excuses."

In December 1981, Mwale was a victim of police brutality when he was detained and beaten up by policemen in Lusaka for allegedly splashing muddy water on people by the roadside. He was forcibly dragged out of his Range Rover by over 15 police men and detained in a police truck for nearly two hours, where they slapped him and hit him with gun butts. Mwale later complained that he was held prisoner for no reason and that he had been molested by the police. "Every time they slapped one of my cheeks, I turned over the other one for them to slap as well."

Mwale then won two fights against his closest Zambian challenger, Chisanda Mutti though many Zambian fans felt he was fortunate to get the decision in the second fight. In between, he lost his second professional fight against American Eddie Mustafa Muhammad via a 4th-round knockout in Las Vegas.

Mwale lost his Commonwealth title to Leslie Stewart of Trinidad and Tobago in Port au Spain in 1985 and soon after, the African title to Nigeria's Joe Lasisi. In 1989, he regained the Zambian light-heavyweight title which he had had to vacate when he won the Commonwealth and African titles, with a 6th-round knockout of Enoch Chama. The following year, he added the Zambian cruiserweight belt after an 8th-round knockout of Joseph Poto. Mwale then got a shot at the WBC International title when he was pitted against Ghanaian Ray Acquaye. Mwale knew that at the age of 38, this was probably his last chance to win an international belt so he trained hard for the fight and turned back the years with an eighth-round knockout in Lusaka. As a result of this victory, Mwale expected to win the Sportsman of the Year award at the 1991 Zambian annual sports awards, but when the award went to athlete Samuel Matete, Mwale was incensed and tore up the certificate of merit that was given to him instead, in full view of everyone at the ceremony. He later apologized for his actions but said he expected to be honoured with the top award after winning an international title for the country.

He however lost the belt in his very next fight to Virgil Hill of the United States two years later in Bismarck, North Dakota after which his promoter called Sandy Saddler (not to be mistaken for the former featherweight champion), disappeared with his $55,000 purse money, leaving him stranded until the Zambian High Commission came to his aid.

He won his next two fights against Wally Kafumbi and Jim Murray and then attempted to win back the Zambian light-heavyweight title which was by then held by Mike Chilambe. In August 1993, Mwale was battered and knocked out in the 8th round after which he shocked his followers when he claimed he had lost the fight because he was drunk. He immediately asked for a rematch which Chilambe granted him. Mwale trained hard for the rematch and promised to teach Chilambe a lesson.

The two faced off again on 2 April 1994. Although Mwale fared much better in this fight, Chilambe was the clear winner with a unanimous points decision. Mwale then announced his retirement from the ring. His career fight record was: 44 fights won, with 34 knockouts, and lost 9 fights, with 4 of these coming in his last six fights.

== Death ==
Mwale then went through some hard times and ended up dependent on charity, donations from well wishers and the Zambian government. In 1999, he suffered from poor co-ordination of the limbs and was diagnosed with Parkinson's disease.

On 17 August 2001, the London-based Boxing News reported Mwale's 'death', painting a grim picture of his poverty-stricken death. When Mwale, who was very much alive, complained that the story had led to the WBC stopping his pension, the magazine retracted the article with an apology, calling it 'an horrendous error' on their part.

After a 6-year battle with Parkinson's disease, Mwale died on 18 October 2005 in Lusaka Zambian President Levy Mwanawasa described him as a national hero, and in November 2008, the WBC announced plans to construct a boxing school in Lusaka in his honour.

On 24 April 2013, Mwale's remains were exhumed from Lusaka's Old Leopard's Hill Cemetery and reburied at Leopards Hill Memorial Park, a resting place befitting a Zambian hero.

== Professional boxing record ==
44 Wins (34 knockouts, 10 decisions), 9 Losses (7 knockouts, 2 decisions) Archived March 30, 2015, at the Wayback Machine
Result	Record	Opponent	Type	Round	Date	Location	Notes
Loss	10-4	(Zambia) Michael Chilambe	PTS	12	02/04/1994	Lusaka, Zambia	Zambia Light Heavyweight Title.
Loss	8-4	(Zambia) Michael Chilambe	TKO	8	28/08/1993	Lusaka, Zambia	Zambia Light Heavyweight Title.
Win	16-5-1	(South Africa) Jim Murray	PTS	10	15/05/1993	Lusaka, Zambia	
Win	0-1	(Zambia) Wally Kafumbi	KO	6	24/11/1992	Chingola, Zambia	
Loss	7-1	(Trinidad and Tobago) Jimmy "Farmer" Joseph	TKO	7	04/09/1992	Port of Spain, Trinidad and Tobago	WBC International Light Heavyweight Title.
Loss	31-1	(United States) Virgil "Quicksilver" Hill	KO	4	11/04/1992	Bismarck, North Dakota, United States	WBC International Light Heavyweight Title. Mwale knocked out at 1:44 of the fourth round.
Win	4-2	(Ghana) "Sugar" Ray Acquaye	KO	8	20/12/1990	Lusaka, Zambia	WBC International Light Heavyweight Title.
Win	3-6	(Zimbabwe) Gilbert Mwambo	KO	4	08/09/1990	Lusaka, Zambia	
Win	1-1-1	(Zambia) Joseph Poto	KO	8	05/08/1990	Lusaka, Zambia	Zambia Cruiserweight Title.
Win	--	(Tanzania) Lucas Msomba	KO	1	21/10/1989	Lusaka, Zambia	
Win	3-3	(Zambia) Enoch Chama	TKO	6	26/08/1989	Lusaka, Zambia	Zambia Light Heavyweight Title.
Loss	34-5	(United States) Lindell Holmes	KO	8	11/03/1988	Düsseldorf, Nordrhein-Westfalen, Germany	
Win	28-11-1	(United States) Jeff Lampkin	PTS	10	05/12/1987	Düsseldorf, Nordrhein-Westfalen, Germany	
Win	3-6	(Zimbabwe) Captain Cleopas Marvel	PTS	8	29/08/1987	Lusaka, Zambia	
Win	22-3	(Zimbabwe) Proud Kilimanjaro	PTS	10	30/05/1987	Harare, Zimbabwe	
Loss	8-0	(Nigeria) Joe Lasisi	KO	8	25/04/1986	Lusaka, Zambia	ABU Light Heavyweight Title.
Loss	17-0	(Trinidad and Tobago) Leslie "Laventille Tiger" Stewart	PTS	12	04/08/1985	Port of Spain, Trinidad and Tobago	Commonwealth Light Heavyweight Title.
Win	--	Fred Sabaath	TKO	2	15/06/1985	Lusaka, Zambia	
Win	2-0	(Nigeria) Joe Allotey	TKO	2	05/05/1985	Lusaka, Zambia	
Win	7-1-1	(United States) Dale Wilburn	KO	2	15/09/1984	Dortmund, Nordrhein-Westfalen, Germany	
Win	--	Diego Alonso	KO	2	25/08/1984	Lusaka, Zambia	
Win	22-4	(New Zealand) Alex Sua	PTS	12	30/07/1984	Lusaka, Zambia	
Win	17-3-1	(Zambia) Chisanda Mutti	PTS	12	08/10/1983	Lusaka, Zambia	Commonwealth Light Heavyweight Title.
Win	--	Elias Mukachunga	KO	2	28/08/1983	Lusaka, Zambia	
Win	24-2-1	(Uganda) Mustafa Wasajja	TKO	3	15/03/1983	Lusaka, Zambia	Commonwealth/ABU Light Heavyweight Title. Referee stopped the bout at 2:15 of the third round.
Win	2-7	(Nigeria) Billy Savage	TKO	2	30/01/1983	Lusaka, Zambia	Commonwealth/ABU Light Heavyweight Title.
Win	18-3	(Zimbabwe) Kid Power	KO	13	28/11/1982	Lusaka, Zambia	Commonwealth/ABU Light Heavyweight Title.
Loss	40-6-1	(United States) Eddie Mustafa Muhammad	KO	4	02/10/1982	Las Vegas, Nevada, United States	Mwale knocked out at 1:47 of the fourth round.
Win	13-2-1	(Zambia) Chisanda Mutti	TKO	13	05/07/1982	Lusaka, Zambia	Commonwealth/ABU Light Heavyweight Title.
Win	14-8-2	(United States) Don Addison	KO	8	01/11/1981	Lusaka, Zambia	
Win	17-3	(Cameroon) Louis Pergaud	KO	5	06/09/1981	Lusaka, Zambia	ABU Light Heavyweight Title.
Loss	27-3-2	(United States) Matthew Saad Muhammad	KO	4	28/11/1980	San Diego, California, United States	WBC World Light Heavyweight Title. Mwale knocked out at 2:25 of the fourth round.
Win	22-19-1	(United States) Ed "Savage" Turner	KO	2	04/05/1980	Lusaka, Zambia	
Win	19-10-2	(United States) Jesse Burnett	PTS	12	04/03/1980	Wembley, London, United Kingdom	119-117.
Win	14-9-1	(United States) Fred Brown	KO	7	29/12/1979	Lusaka, Zambia	
Win	52-12-1	(Jamaica) Bunny Johnson	PTS	10	23/10/1979	Wembley, London, United Kingdom	
Win	33-34-2	(Trinidad and Tobago) Carlos Marks	KO	2	09/10/1979	Kensington, London, United Kingdom	
Win	22-12-2	(Mali) Ba Sounkalo	KO	5	30/09/1979	Lusaka, Zambia	African light-heavyweight title.
Win	8-5-1	(United States) Vandell "Big Boy" Woods	KO	3	11/09/1979	Wembley, London, United Kingdom	
Win	11-12-1	(United States) Dave Lee Royster	TKO	4	04/06/1979	Liverpool, Merseyside, United Kingdom	
Win	35-14-3	(Canada) Gary Summerhays	TKO	5	31/03/1979	Lusaka, Zambia	Commonwealth Light Heavyweight Title.
Win	8-6	(United States) Billy Ratliff	TKO	2	26/02/1979	Mayfair, London, United Kingdom	
Win	10-18-4	(United States) Bob "Natchez Lightning" Smith	KO	4	30/12/1978	Lusaka, Zambia	
Win	29-3-3	(Italy) Ennio Cornetti	KO	5	04/11/1978	Lusaka, Zambia	
Win	29-6	(United States) Lonnie Bennett	KO	1	30/09/1978	Lusaka, Zambia	
Win	20-1	(United States) Marvin Johnson	PTS	8	17/06/1978	(Socialist Federal Republic of Yugoslavia) Belgrade, Yugoslavia	
Win	24-0-1	(United Kingdom) Tony Sibson	KO	1	23/05/1978	Leicester, Leicestershire, United Kingdom	
Win	14-15-1	(The Bahamas) Bobby Lloyd	PTS	10	02/03/1978	Oslo, Norway	
Win	6-2-1	(Australia) Dragon Todorovic	KO	6	01/09/1977	Lusaka, Zambia	
Win	0-1	Fanwell Mwanza	KO	2	01/08/1977	Kitwe, Zambia	
Win	12-7	(Zambia) George Chisenga	KO	4	01/07/1977	Lusaka, Zambia	
Win	1-0	(Zambia) Julius Luipa	KO	6	09/05/1977	Lusaka, Zambia	Zambia Light Heavyweight Title.
Win	--	(Zambia) Fanwell Mwanza	KO	6	08/04/1977	Lusaka, Zambia	
