= Poul Knudsen =

Poul Knudsen may refer to:

- Poul Knudsen (writer) (1889–1974), Danish writer
- Poul Knudsen (boxer) (born 1951), Danish Olympic boxer
