= DCU Center =

Indoor arena in Worcester, Massachusetts, U.S.

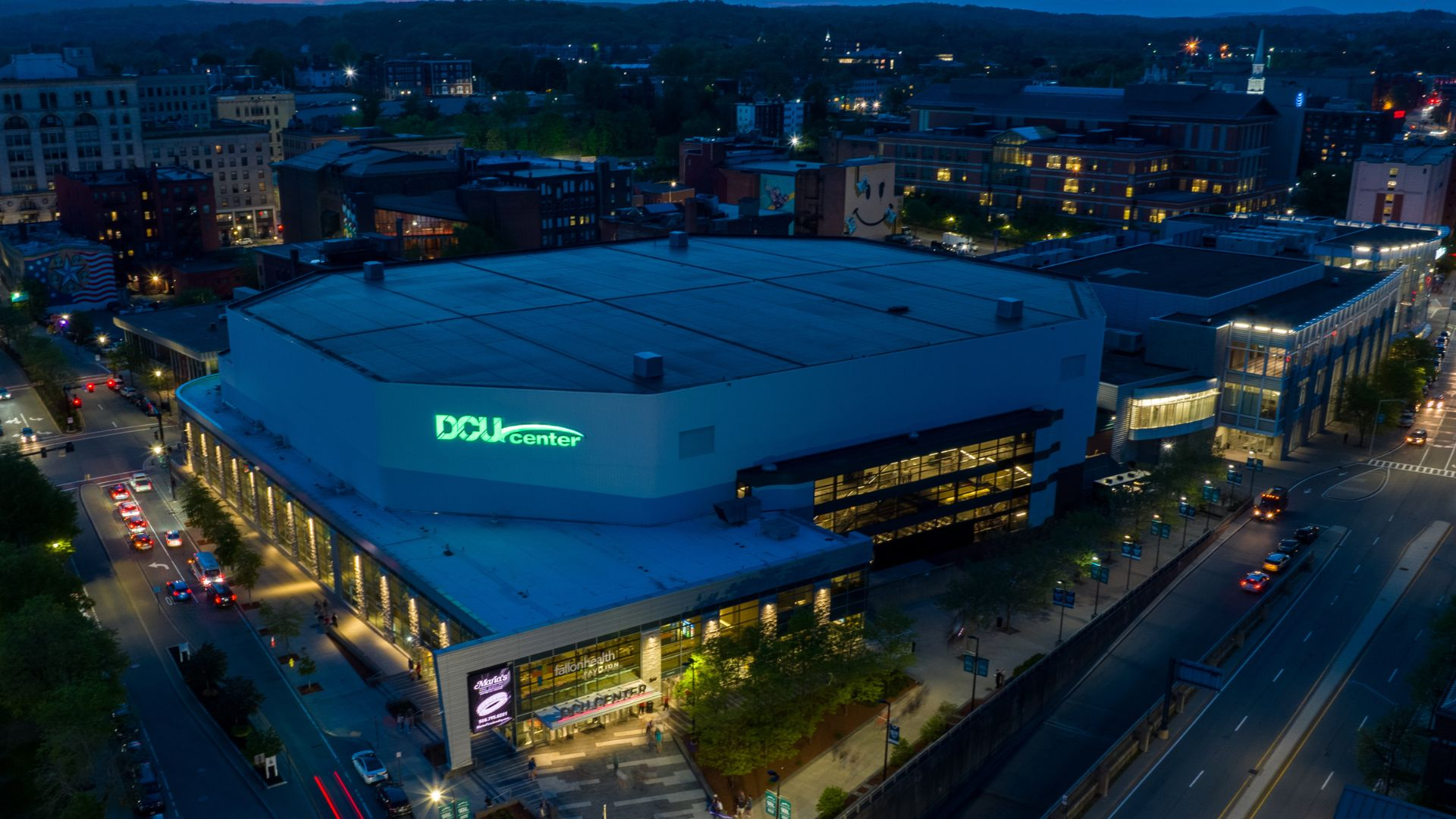

- Location within Massachusetts Location within the United States
- Full name: DCU Center Arena & Convention Center
- Former names: Centrum in Worcester (1982–97); Worcester's Centrum Centre (1997–2004)
- Address: 50 Foster Street
- Location: Worcester, Massachusetts, U.S.
- Coordinates: 42°15′58″N 71°47′54″W
- Owner: City of Worcester
- Operator: Legends Global
- Capacity: Concerts: 14,800; Basketball: 13,000; Hockey: 12,135
- Public transit: MBTA Framingham/Worcester Line Worcester

Construction
- Groundbreaking: December 10, 1977
- Opened: September 2, 1982
- Renovated: 2009, 2012, 2013
- Expanded: 1997
- Cost: $25.6 million ($85.4 million in 2025 dollars) $23 million (2013 renovations)
- Architect: FDC, Inc.
- Structural engineer: LeMessurier Consultants
- General contractor: Granger Brothers Inc.

Tenants
- New England Blazers (MILL) Worcester Counts (WBL) Massachusetts Marauders (AFL) Worcester IceCats (AHL) Worcester Sharks (AHL) New England Surge (CIFL) Worcester Railers (ECHL) Massachusetts Pirates (NAL/IFL): 1989–1991; 1989; 1994; 1994–2005; 2006–2015; 2007–2008; 2017–present 2018–2023

Website
- dcucenter.com

The DCU Center (originally Centrum in Worcester, formerly Worcester's Centrum Centre and commonly Worcester Centrum) is an indoor arena and convention center complex in downtown Worcester, Massachusetts. The facility hosts a variety of events, including concerts, sporting events, family shows, conventions, trade-shows and meetings. It is owned by the City of Worcester and managed by ASM Global, a private management firm for public assembly facilities.

Ten-year naming rights were purchased in 2004 by Digital Federal Credit Union (DCU) and went into effect January 2005. DCU's naming rights were later extended to 2027.

== History ==
The Centrum, or officially Centrum in Worcester as it was then known, opened in September 1982 after years of construction delays, with a capacity of roughly 12,000. The first performance on September 1, 1982, was a free concert sponsored by The City of Worcester with Mayor Sara Robertson acting as Master of Ceremonies with the New England Symphony Orchestra performing. The first paid opening event was a Frank Sinatra concert on September 2, 1982. The arena was expanded to 14,800 seats in 1989 with the addition of the 300-level balconies. The convention center addition was completed along with a renovation of arena infrastructure in 1997. This upgrade resulted in the facility's name change to Worcester's Centrum Centre. The venue then received further updates with the DCU naming rights purchase, including new signage both inside and outside the facility, and a new center-hung video scoreboard for the arena bowl. In the summer of 2023, all arena seats were replaced.

== Sports ==
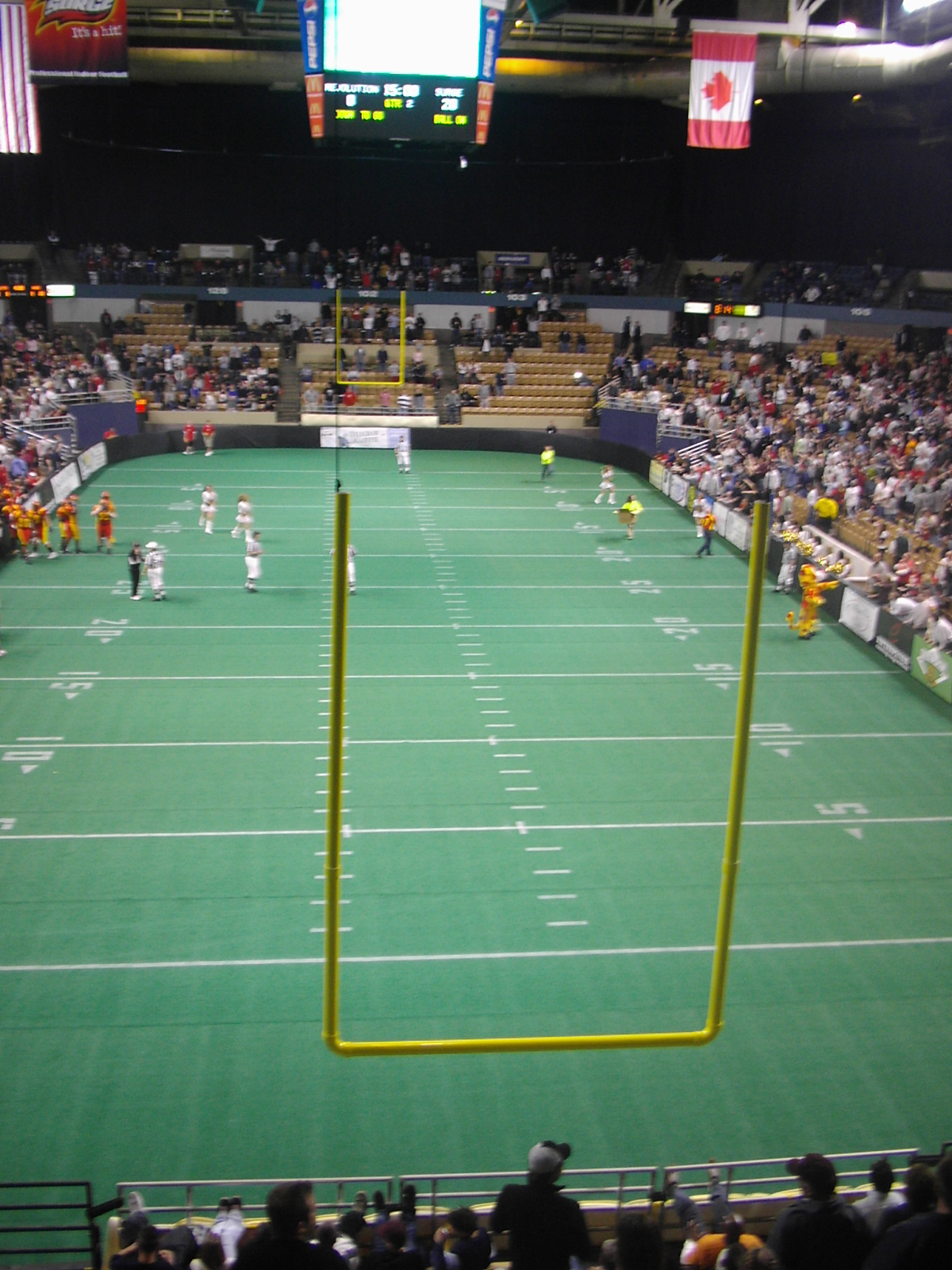
View of the DCU Center during the inaugural New England Surge game in April 2007

=== Ice hockey ===
The arena has been the home to the Worcester Railers which began play in 2017 as a member of the ECHL. The arena was formerly home to the Worcester Sharks American Hockey League (AHL) team, owned and operated by its NHL affiliate San Jose Sharks, which moved its farm team to the west coast in 2015. Prior to this, the venue was home to the Worcester IceCats, also of the AHL. The arena also hosted the 2009 AHL All-Star Classic on January 29, 2009. The PlanetUSA All stars defeated Team Canada, 14–11, in the highest-scoring AHL All Star game in history of the league. In 2026, the arena hosted one of the four regions for the NCAA Frozen Four tournament.

=== Basketball ===
Worcester has been host to Boston Celtics preseason games in some years. They also hosted the first and second rounds of the 1992 and 2005 NCAA men's Division I basketball tournaments.

=== Indoor football ===
The arena has been home to multiple indoor football teams. The Massachusetts Marauders of the Arena Football League played in the arena in the 1994 season, but folded after one year in Massachusetts. The New England Surge of the Continental Indoor Football League also called the Center home for two seasons, but ceased operations after the 2008 season. In 2018, the Massachusetts Pirates began their inaugural season in the National Arena League, going 11-5 and regular season champions in their first year. They joined the Indoor Football League in 2021, and went on to win that year's United Bowl. In 2023 the Massachusetts Pirates announced they would be departing the arena.

=== Professional wrestling ===
On May 17, 1998, it was the host of WCW's WCW Slamboree. Additionally, on April 27, 2003, WWE Backlash came to the DCU Center.

In additional several WWE events have taken place at the DCU Center. On December 28, 1998, Mick Foley, performing under the name Mankind, won his first WWE Championship during the taping of the January 4, 1999 edition of Monday Night Raw at the Worcester Centrum Centre, defeating The Rock. On May 5, 2002, it hosted a house show that would end up being the final show held under the WWF name, with the company changing its name to the WWE one day later. On July 12, 2005, it was the host of the July 14, 2005 taping of SmackDown!. On November 2, 2009, it was the host of WWE Raw for the first time in nine years. On January 14, 2014, it was the host of the January 17 taping of SmackDown!. It was the host of WWE SmackDown when it went live on July 19, 2016, an episode featuring WWE's second ever brand extension draft.

For the first time Total Nonstop Action Wrestling debuted at the DCU Center on January 20, 2012.

=== Boxing ===
On February 11, 1983, Marvelous Marvin Hagler retained his WBC, WBA and The Ring Middleweight titles against English boxer Tony Sibson at the arena. It was Hagler's 60th professional fight and his 56th win overall. The fight was the only time Hagler fought at the arena and was the last of 36 he fought in the Commonwealth of Massachusetts.

=== Collegiate ===
The College of the Holy Cross uses the facility as an alternate location for anticipated larger attendance home games for men's basketball and men's ice hockey.

== Music ==
During the 1980s, the arena became an alternate stop for touring musical acts, offering them a small venue that could draw from both the Boston and Providence concert markets simultaneously. The old Boston Garden had poor acoustics and lacked air conditioning, prompting promoters to schedule Boston area shows at the arena. This practice continues today as the arena is an alternative to the larger TD Garden.

The impact was also felt immediately thirty-five miles south at the Providence Civic Center. Within six months of The Centrum's opening, Providence's WPRI Channel 12 news ran a two-part story by reporter Brian Rooney citing a situation the week prior with the Kiss band as a prime example of how the newly built Centrum was cutting deeply into the Providence Civic Center's vital concert business.

Shortly after the Centrum's September 1982 opening, RI promoter Frank J. Russo scheduled Kiss on their Creatures of the Night Tour/10th Anniversary Tour for a January 23, 1983 show at their usual area stop – the Providence Civic Center. He also scheduled a show the night prior at the new Centrum. The Centrum Kiss date sold thousands more tickets than the Civic Center Kiss date, which petered out at 2,000 sales. Russo canceled the Providence show and publicly offered to trade Centrum Kiss show tickets for Civic Center Kiss show tickets in lieu of refunds, throwing in a free bus ride up and back. On January 22, 1983, hundreds of fans departed from Sabin Street in front of the Providence Civic Center, headed up on chartered buses to the competing venue (after this, for the next four tours in a row, only the Centrum got area bookings from Kiss; they did not attempt to play the Providence Civic Center again until 1988). On January 27, 1988, Kiss paused in the middle of their Crazy Nights tour concert at the arena and filmed most of the footage for a music video supporting their impending "Turn On The Night" single. The video was directed by Marty Callner who laid tracks inside the security barrier in front of the stage for a moving camera to film up at lead singer Paul Stanley dancing up a stage ramp while lip-synching the lyrics and featured a dolly shot running down the center aisle showing the crowd. "Turn On the Night" only charted in the UK, where it reached #41.

Rooney reported the new Centrum was "thriving", and already "doing double the business expected" despite the recession. Worcester Centrum Director Antonio Tavares told Rooney, in a shot at his competition down south, "You can no longer sit and wait for the phone to ring and expect acts to be calling you, especially unique types of events, and say 'Hey, we're interested in playing the Providence Civic Center'. That doesn't happen anymore." Rooney showed footage of a tennis match, a tractor pull, and Kiss playing to underline the variety of events hosted by the new Centrum after only a few months of operation.

From August 13 to August 24, 1987, in an effort to thank their local fans for years of support and allow wide availability of tickets, Boston played an unprecedented nine-show run on their Third Stage tour. Starting with a three-night booking, as each show neared selling out another night was added. This successful tour stop prompted a good-natured ad parody on rock radio station WBCN, "Now appearing at the Centrum, Boston on Ice!", a reference to themed ice shows.

The arena played host to what some fans consider to be the greatest two-night stand in the history of The Dave Matthews Band, in December 1998. Fresh off their May release of Before These Crowded Streets, they played some of the more diverse concerts in their history. Bela Fleck and the Flecktones joined DMB for these shows opening both nights and even sitting in on much of sets for both nights.

The Grateful Dead played the Centrum 12 times between 1983 and 1988. Dates they played included 10/20/83, 10/21/83, 10/8/84, 10/9/84, 11/4/85, 11/5/85, 4/2/87, 4/3/87, 4/4/87, 4/7/88, 4/8/88, and 4/9/88. 4/3/87 is the most listened-to Grateful Dead tape on Archive.org. Bill Walton took the Boston Celtics to see the Grateful Dead at the Centrum.

The venue has hosted 16 concerts of the band Phish. On December 31, 1993, they played their first concert at the Centrum, complete with a stage decorated like an aquarium (featured for the 1993 New Years run). Footage from this show was featured in the band's only official music video, "Down with Disease", whose jam debuted that night. On November 29, 1997, Phish played their longest song in band history, a 58-minute version of "Runaway Jim". The concert performed nearly a year later, on November 27, 1998, was later released as a live album, entitled Live Phish Volume 6. On December 27–28, 2010, they returned for a pair of concerts, the group's 11th and 12th appearances at the venue and its first public performances there in over seven years, performing one of the most well received renditions of "Harry Hood" since reuniting in 2009. They would return for two more concerts on June 7–8, 2012, notable for being that Summer tour's opening concerts. Phish would again return amidst their acclaimed Fall 2013 tour for two concerts on October 25–26, 2013.

The arena played host to The Up in Smoke Tour on July 20–21, 2000. The show featured many famous rappers and hip hop artists, including Ice Cube, Eminem, Proof, Snoop Dogg, Dr. Dre, Nate Dogg, Kurupt, D12, MC Ren, Westside Connection, Mel-Man, Tha Eastsidaz, Doggy's Angels, Devin The Dude, Warren G, TQ, Truth Hurts, Xzibit and The D.O.C. The July 20 show was filmed and later released as a live DVD.

The arena played host to The Tattoo the Earth Tour on October 5–7, 2001, and October 12–14, 2002. The show featured performances by Slipknot, Slayer, Sevendust, Sepultura, Hed PE, Mudvayne, downset., Hatebreed, Full Devil Jacket, Famous, Amen, U.P.O., Nothingface, PPM, Cold, Relative Ash, Systematic, Six Feet Under, Candiria, Lamb of God, God Forbid, Darkest Hour, Unearth, All That Remains, Dropkick Murphys, Sick of It All, Tiger Army, Converge, The Unseen, Reach the Sky, Stretch Arm Strong, Kill Your Idols and Nashville Pussy. It also featured 42 tattoo artists from Australia, Austria, France, Germany, Malaysia, Manitoba, Spain, Switzerland and the US.

On October 29, 2016, the arena hosted the "I Love The 90's" tour, featuring Salt-N-Pepa, Vanilla Ice, Coolio, Young MC, Color Me Badd, and All-4-One.

Boston natives Aerosmith have performed at the DCU Center 13 times over the course of their career, including a few New Year's Eve shows.

Popular rapper Tyler, the Creator took the stage at DCU on March 3, 2022.

On April 29, 2023, DCU hosted The Big Gig which consisted of bands Dorothy (band), Beartooth (band), The Pretty Reckless, Falling in Reverse and Breaking Benjamin.

== Other events ==
The arena features annual appearances of the top family shows including Sesame Street Live, Disney on Ice, Harlem Globetrotters and The Wiggles, among others.

The Professional Bull Riders (PBR) has hosted a Built Ford Tough Series bull riding event at the arena every year from the event's inception in 1998. The Built Ford Tough Series was known as the Bud Light Cup until the 2002 season.

On January 29–30, 2011, the Massachusetts International 28th Auto Show was held at the arena.

On June 11, 2014, Worcester Technical High School held their graduation at the DCU Center, notable for the commencement address by President Barack Obama.

On November 18, 2015, future President Donald Trump held a rally at the DCU Center for a campaign stop. Secret Service agents screened attendees before the event. A crowd of over 10,000 was in attendance.

On August 23–25, 2019, a Super Smash Bros. tournament titled Shine 2019 was held at the DCU Center. Over 1,600 competitors attended the tournament and the livestream had over 30,000 concurrent viewers on the final day.

== Expansion, convention center ==
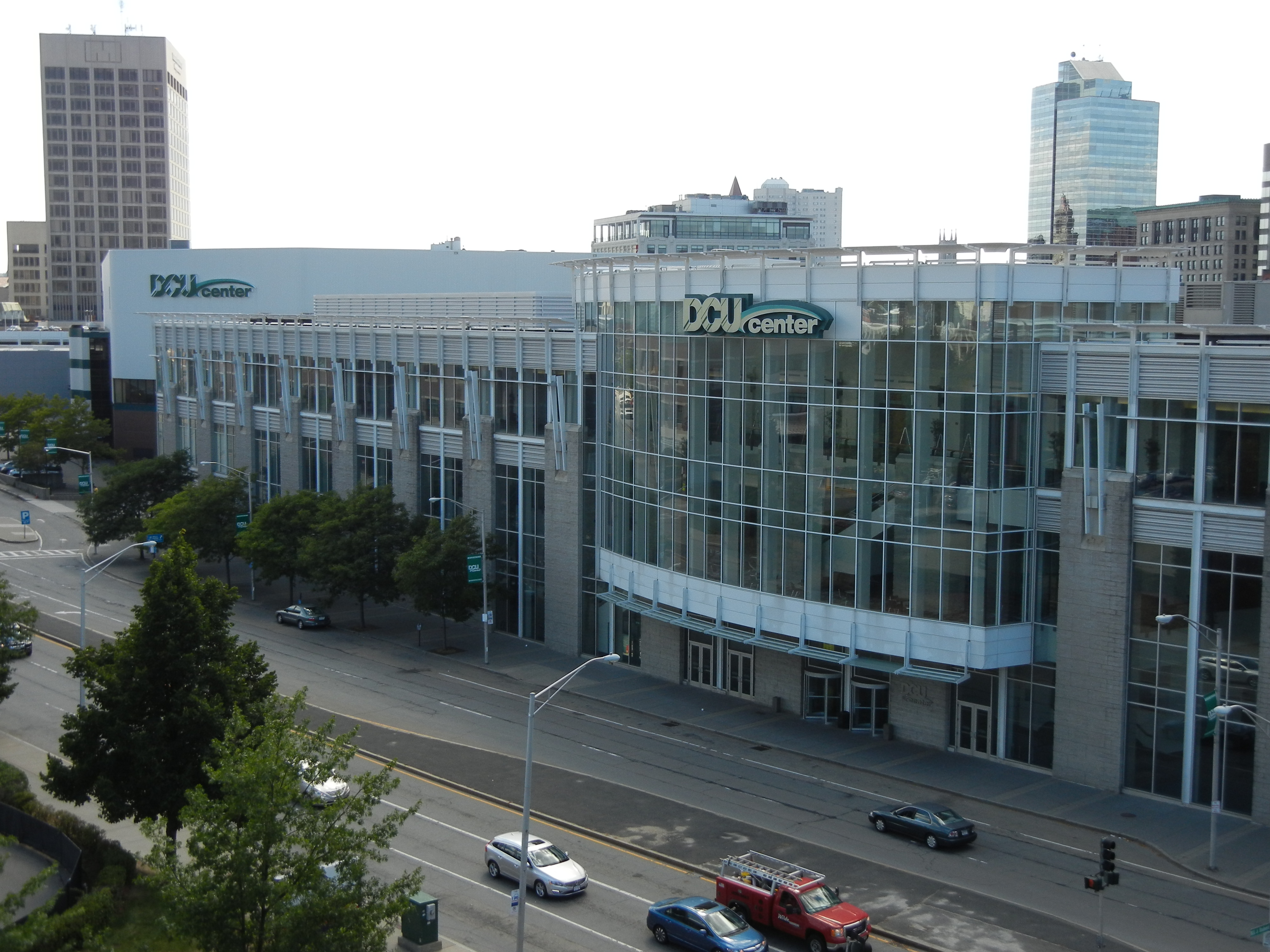
1997 Convention Center addition

The facility expanded in 1997 with the opening of an attached convention center that features panoramic views of downtown Worcester. The complex added 50,000 square feet (4,600 m^{2}) of exhibit space, 11 meeting rooms, a 12,144-square-foot (1,128.2 m^{2}) ballroom (the largest in Central Massachusetts) and a kitchen. The facility's 100,000-plus square feet of exhibit space is filled by consumer shows, trade shows, conventions, conferences, and other public and private functions year-round. An additional headquarters hotel for the facility, the Hilton Garden, opened in October 2006, doubling the number of rooms previously available in the facility's other headquarters hotel, the former Crowne Plaza that closed in 2009.

== Renovations ==
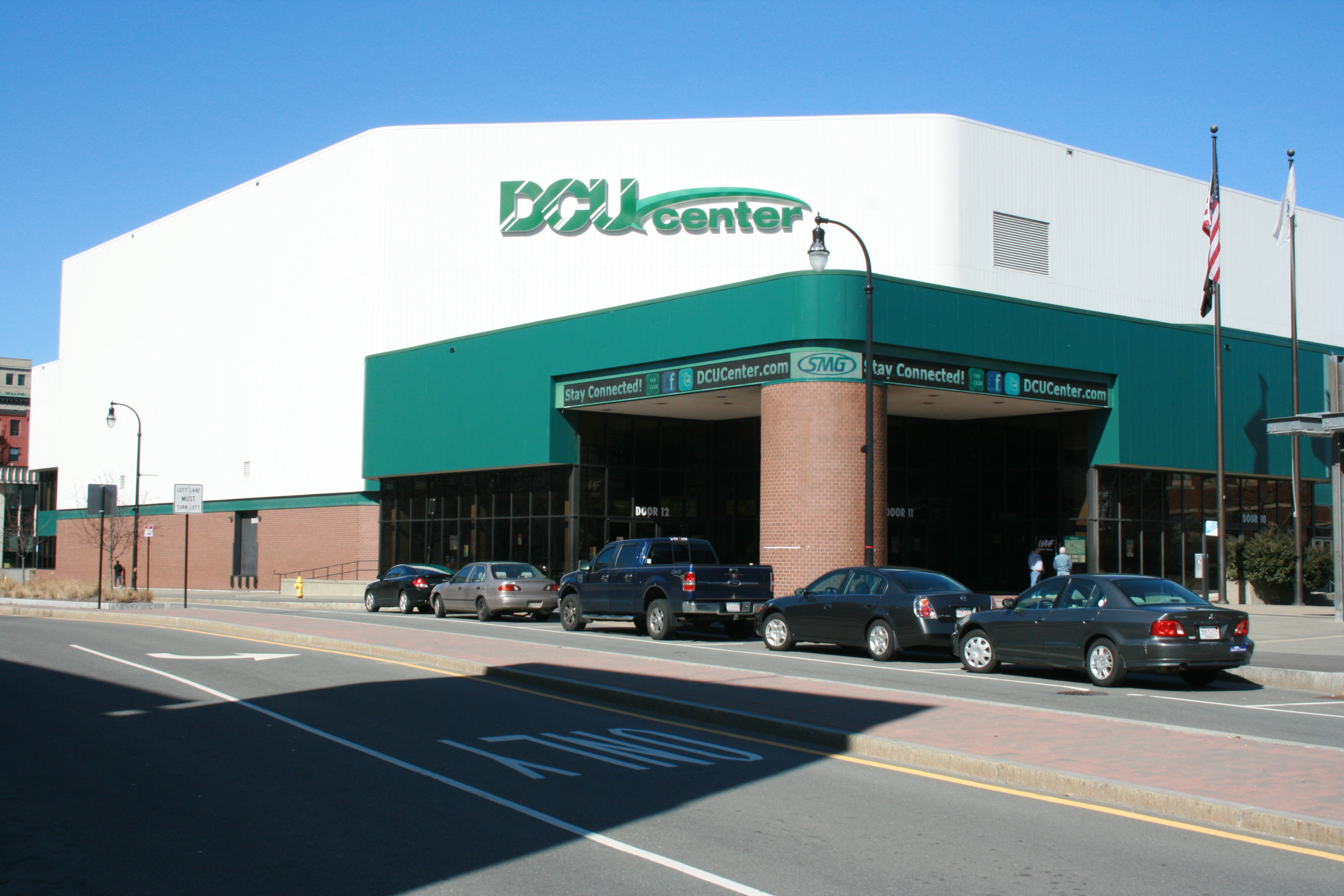
Foster Street façade before 2012 renovation

It was announced on June 3, 2009, that the DCU Center would undergo a series of major renovations. There were to be three or four phases to the renovations, scheduled to avoid the Worcester Sharks AHL season. Work on the arena was expected to last three to four summers. Some of the major improvements were a new electrical system, new ice chillers, and a completely new ice floor all of which are original to the arena which opened in 1982. Other improvements to the arena during phase 1 will include a new dasher board system and a new seamless glass system, which are often found in new arenas.

During the summer of 2012, phase 2 of the renovations began. These included a new glass wall on the Foster Street side of the building; major improvements to heating, ventilation and cooling systems; upgrades to restrooms and concessions.. In 2018/2019, a plan of $37 million renovations were announced for the next four years. In the summer of 2023, the facility replaced all arena seats.
