= Peter Dula =

Kenyan boxer (born 1947)

Personal information
- Nationality: Kenyan
- Born: 15 November 1947 (age 77)

Sport
- Sport: Boxing

Peter Dula (born 15 November 1947) is a Kenyan boxer. He competed in the men's middleweight event at the 1972 Summer Olympics.
