= Bill Knight (boxer) =

British boxer

Personal information
- Full name: William Knight
- Nationality: British
- Born: 26 July 1951 (age 74) Saint Kitts

Sport
- Sport: Boxing
Medal record
Boxing
Representing England
Commonwealth Games
Gold medal – first place	1974 Christchurch	Light heavyweight

William Knight (born 26 July 1951) is a retired British boxer.

== Boxing career ==
He competed in the men's middleweight event at the 1972 Summer Olympics. In his first fight, he defeated Julius Luipa of Zambia, before losing to Alejandro Montoya of Cuba in the next round.

He represented England and won a gold medal in the light heavyweight division, at the 1974 British Commonwealth Games in Christchurch, New Zealand.

Knight won the Amateur Boxing Association 1972, 1973 and 1974 light heavyweight title, when boxing out of the Lynn ABC.
