= Ewald Jarmer =

German boxer (born 1942)

Personal information
- Nationality: German
- Born: 12 August 1942 (age 83) Rostitz, Nazi Germany (modern-day Rozstání, Czech Republic)

Sport
- Sport: Boxing

Ewald Jarmer (born 12 August 1942) is a German boxer. He competed in the men's middleweight event at the 1972 Summer Olympics. At the 1972 Summer Olympics, he lost to Marvin Johnson of the United States.
