= Poul Knudsen (boxer) =

Retired Danish amateur boxer

Poul Knudsen (born 25 September 1951) is a Danish retired amateur boxer. He participated in the 1972 Olympics in Munich in the middleweight, losing in the quarterfinals to Prince Amartey from Ghana.

== Olympic record ==
Men's Middleweight (– 75 kg)

  - First Round — Bye
  - Second Round — Defeated William Peets (ISV), 5:0
  - Quarterfinals — Lost to Prince Amartey (GHA), 2:3
