= Chisanda Mutti =

Zambian boxer

Personal information
- Nickname: Kent Green
- Nationality: Zambian
- Born: 14 February 1957 Lusaka, Rhodesia
- Died: late 1990s
- Weight: Middleweight; Light heavyweight Cruiserweight; Heavyweight

Boxing career
- Stance: Orthodox

Boxing record
- Total fights: 37
- Wins: 25
- Win by KO: 20
- Losses: 9
- Draws: 3

Chisanda "Kent Green" Mutti (14 February 1957 — late 1990s) was a Zambian professional boxer of the 1970s and 1980s who won the Zambia middleweight title, Zambia light heavyweight title, and Commonwealth cruiserweight title, and was a challenger for the Commonwealth middleweight title against Tony Sibson, Commonwealth light heavyweight title against Lottie Mwale, African Boxing Union light heavyweight title against Lottie Mwale, and International Boxing Federation (IBF) cruiserweight title against Lee Roy Murphy, and Rickey Parkey, his professional fighting weight varied from 160 lb (73 kg; 11 st 6 lb), i.e. middleweight to 192 lb (87 kg; 13 st 10 lb), i.e. heavyweight.
