= Alejandro Montoya =

Cuban boxer (born 1952)

Personal information
- Full name: Alejandro Montoya Vera
- Nationality: Cuban
- Born: 3 May 1952 (age 74)
- Height: 169 cm (5 ft 7 in)
- Weight: 163 lb (74 kg)

Sport
- Sport: Boxing
- Weight class: Middleweight
Medal record
Men's amateur boxing
Representing Cuba
Pan American Games
Gold medal – first place	1975 Mexico City	Middleweight
Central American and Caribbean Games
Gold medal – first place	1974 Santo Domingo	Middleweight

Alejandro Montoya Vera (Note: In this Spanish name, the first or paternal surname is Montoya and the second or maternal family name is Vera.) (born 3 May 1952) is a Cuban boxer. He competed in the men's middleweight event at the 1972 Summer Olympics. He lost in the quarter-finals of the tournament to Marvin Johnson of the United States, after defeating Alec Nastac and Bill Knight in previous rounds.
