= Marvin Johnson (boxer) =

American boxer

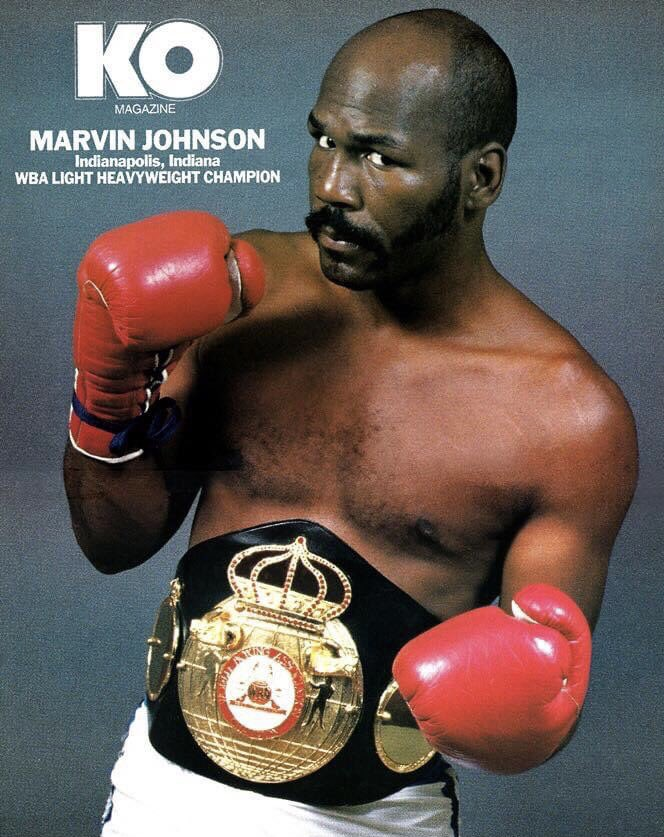
- Johnson c. 1986

Personal information
- Nickname: Pops
- Born: Marvin Johnson; April 12, 1954 (age 72) Indianapolis, Indiana, USA
- Height: 5 ft 10 1/2 in (179 cm)
- Weight: Light heavyweight

Boxing career
- Reach: 72 1/2 in (184 cm)
- Stance: Southpaw

Boxing record
- Total fights: 49
- Wins: 43
- Win by KO: 35
- Losses: 6
Medal record
Representing United States
Olympic Games
Bronze medal – third place	1972 Munich	Middleweight

Marvin Johnson (born April 12, 1954) is an American former professional boxer who competed from 1973 to 1987. He is a 3-time light heavyweight champion having held the World Boxing Council (WBC) light heavyweight title from 1978 to 1979, and the World Boxing Association (WBA) light heavyweight title twice between 1979 and 1987. As an amateur, Johnson fought in the 1972 Olympics in Munich, winning a bronze medal at middleweight. He was inducted into the World Boxing Hall of Fame in 2008.

== Amateur career ==
(gold) Won the 1971 National Golden Gloves Light Heavyweight Championship, March 22 at Fort Worth, Texas:

(gold) Won the 1971 National AAU Light Heavyweight (178 lb.) Championship, May 1 at New Orleans, Louisiana:

- Finals: Defeated Hernando Molyneaux KO 1

(gold) Won the 1971 North American (178 lb.) Championship, May 31 at Latham, New York:

- Defeated William Titley (Canada) TKO 1

(gold) Won The 1972 National Golden Gloves Middleweight (165 lb.) Championship, March 20 at Minneapolis, Minnesota:

- 1/2: Defeated Joey Hadley by decision (Hadley cut under both eyes)
- Finals: Defeated Don Rucker KO 2 (0:50)

(bronze) Represented the United States at the 1972 Munich Olympic Games, earning a bronze medal in the 165 pound class, after he was knocked out in the semifinal by eventual gold medalist Vyacheslav Lemeshev of the Soviet Union.

=== 1972 Olympic results ===
Below are the results of Marvin Johnson, an American middleweight boxer, who competed at the 1972 Munich Olympics:

- Round of 16: Defeated Ewald Jarmer (West Germany) by unanimous decision, 5–0
- Quarterfinal: Defeated Alejandro Montoya (Cuba) by unanimous decision, 5–0
- Semifinal: Lost to Vyacheslav Lemeshev (Soviet Union) by second-round TKO (was awarded bronze medal)

== Professional career ==
As a professional, Johnson won his first 15 bouts, including a nationally televised 4th-round knockout over highly regarded veteran Tom "The Bomb" Bethea. However, Johnson lost for the first time as a professional in his next fight, against rising contender Matthew Franklin (later known as Matthew Saad Muhammad) by 12th-round knockout in a furious battle for the NABF light heavyweight title. Following this setback, Johnson rallied, not for the last time in his career, impressively winning several bouts, until losing a decision to highly ranked Lottie Mwale. A subsequent win over Jerry Celestine set up a world title fight, which saw Johnson taking the WBC light heavyweight crown from fellow southpaw Mate Parlov of Yugoslavia via 10th-round KO in Italy in December 1978. For his first title defense, in April 1979, Johnson chose Matthew Franklin, the very man who had beaten him in an epic war two years earlier. In front of his hometown Indianapolis fans, Johnson engaged Franklin in a rematch of such intensity and drama that it is regarded among boxing historians as one of the greatest title fights in history. Mirroring their first brutal encounter, Johnson controlled the early going, but the Philadelphia-based Franklin gamely hung in. The tide turned in the 6th and 7th rounds as Johnson began to tire. Ultimately Franklin prevailed in the 8th, a round of such ferocity that it would enter boxing lore, stopping Johnson late in the frame, despite bleeding severely himself from the nose and from cuts around both eyes.

Showing the resilience that would mark his career, Johnson would again win a world title belt later that very year—this time the WBA version—by fighting the rugged Victor Galindez from Argentina in New Orleans as part of a three-fight 'television card' that included two title bouts (Antuofermo-Hagler I and Benitez-Leonard) staged in Las Vegas. After a see-saw battle through the first ten rounds, Johnson nailed—and floored—Galindez with one of his fabled 'over-the-top-from-underneath' left hands, and the title changed hands when the champion's corner surrendered after Galindez hit the canvas.

As with his previous first title defense, Johnson again chose the strongest available contender to challenge for his belt, this time Eddie Gregory (later to be known as Eddie Mustafa Muhammad). On the Tate–Weaver undercard in Knoxville in March 1980, Johnson fought courageously, but ultimately succumbed to Eddie Mustafa Muhammad (né Gregory), who used a vicious body attack to outwork, out-hustle and out last the game champion en route to an 11th-round TKO victory.

Things looked bleak when Johnson fought the up-and-coming Michael Spinks in early 1981—just before Spinks dethroned Johnson's latest conqueror, Mustafa Muhammad. Johnson was off to a promising start, but the 1976 Olympian Spinks landed his famous "Spinks jinx" that put Johnson out for good in the fourth round.

Johnson recovered and proceeded to win 16 straight fights, defeating good fighters like Charles Williams along the way, and in February 1986 would again be before his Indianapolis fans, fighting Leslie Stewart of Trinidad and Tobago for the WBA light heavyweight title that became vacant when Spinks abdicated to become a heavyweight. Stewart gave Johnson some fits, but cuts would take their toll on Stewart and were the reason that the fight was stopped in the seventh round, thus making Johnson the first ever three-time champion in the division. An injury postponed his first defense against Jean-Marie Emebe of Cameroon, but the two would hook up in Indianapolis in September of that year. It was the first time that Johnson would both enter and leave the ring as champion—he was the winner by 13th-round TKO.

Next, it was on to Trinidad and Tobago for a rematch with Stewart on May 23, 1987. However, it was all Stewart this time, as he floored Johnson several times in the first few rounds, and while Johnson always regained his feet and was never counted out he did tell his cornermen after eight rounds that 'enough was enough,' and by doing so became an ex-champ for a third time.

Johnson retired after that bout.

== Honors ==
Named The Ring magazine Comeback of the Year fighter for 1984.

== Professional boxing record ==
49 fights	43 wins	6 losses
By knockout	35	5
By decision	8	1

No.	Result	Record	Opponent	Type	Round, time	Date	Location	Notes
49	Loss	43–6	Leslie Stewart	RTD	8 (12), 3:00	May 23, 1987	National Stadium, Port-of-Spain, Trinidad and Tobago	Lost WBA light heavyweight title
48	Win	43–5	Jean Marie Emebe	TKO	13 (15), 1:41	Sep 20, 1986	Market Square Arena, Indianapolis, U.S.	Retained WBA light heavyweight title
47	Win	42–5	Leslie Stewart	TKO	7 (15), 0:56	Feb 9, 1986	Market Square Arena, Indianapolis, U.S.	Won vacant WBA light heavyweight title
46	Win	41–5	Frank Lux	KO	4 (10), 0:55	Dec 4, 1985	Market Square Arena, Indianapolis, U.S.	
45	Win	40–5	Raleigh Searcy	TKO	4 (10), 2:59	Oct 11, 1985	Hulman Center, Terre Haute, U.S.	
44	Win	39–5	Eddie Davis	TKO	5 (12), 0:59	Apr 21, 1985	Sands Casino Hotel, Atlantic City, U.S.	Won USBA light heavyweight title
43	Win	38–5	Charles Henderson	TKO	2 (10), 1:55	Jan 17, 1985	Holiday Star Theater, Merrillville, U.S.	
42	Win	37–5	Eddie Collins	KO	2 (10), 1:35	Dec 13, 1984	Sands Casino Hotel, Atlantic Cityx, U.S.	
41	Win	36–5	Charles Williams	UD	10	Nov 8, 1984	Tyndall Armory, Indianapolis, U.S.	
40	Win	35–5	Johnny Davis	UD	10	Aug 30, 1984	Sands Casino Hotel, Atlantic City, U.S.	
39	Win	34–5	Jerome Clouden	RTD	5 (10), 3:00	Jun 14, 1984	Sands Casino Hotel, Atlantic City, U.S.	
38	Win	33–5	Eddie Gonzales	KO	4 (10), 2:26	Mar 26, 1984	Sands Casino Hotel, Atlantic City, U.S.	
37	Win	32–5	Elvis Parks	TKO	4 (10)	Jan 18, 1984	Tyndall Armory, Indianapolis, U.S.	
36	Win	31–5	Mike Brothers	TKO	10 (10)	Nov 21, 1983	Americana Congress Hotel, Chicago, U.S.	
35	Win	30–5	Andros Ernie Barr	TKO	8 (10)	Feb 25, 1983	Nassau, Bahamas	
34	Win	29–5	Alvino Manson	KO	1 (12), 1:00	Oct 14, 1982	Tyndall Armory, Indianapolis, U.S.	
33	Win	28–5	Darnell Hayes	TKO	2 (10), 1:55	Apr 6, 1982	Civic Center, Danville, U.S.	
32	Loss	27–5	Michael Spinks	KO	4 (10), 1:22	Mar 28, 1981	Resorts International, Atlantic City, U.S.	
31	Win	27–4	Rick Nash	TKO	3 (8), 1:35	Jan 28, 1981	Atkinson Hotel, Indianapolis, U.S.	
30	Win	26–4	Eddie Straight	TKO	1 (10)	Jan 15, 1981	Tyndall Armory, Indianapolis, U.S.	
29	Win	25–4	Dave Lee Royster	KO	4 (10), 2:51	Sep 9, 1980	Resorts International, Atlantic City, U.S.	
28	Loss	24–4	Eddie Mustafa Muhammad	TKO	11 (15), 2:43	Mar 31, 1980	Stokely Athletic Center, Knoxville, U.S.	Lost WBA light heavyweight title
27	Win	24–3	Víctor Galíndez	KO	11 (15), 0:20	Nov 30, 1979	Superdome, New Orleans, U.S.	Won WBA light heavyweight title
26	Win	23–3	Carlos Marks	UD	10	Sep 20, 1979	Market Square Arena, Indianapolis, U.S.	
25	Loss	22–3	Matthew Saad Muhammad	TKO	8 (15), 1:44	Apr 22, 1979	Market Square Arena, Indianapolis, U.S.	Lost WBC light heavyweight title
24	Win	22–2	Mate Parlov	TKO	10 (15), 2:33	Dec 2, 1978	Palazzo Dello Sport, Marsala, Italy	Won WBC light heavyweight title
23	Win	21–2	Jerry Celestine	UD	10	Sep 15, 1978	Superdome, New Orleans, U.S.	
22	Loss	20–2	Lottie Mwale	PTS	8	Jun 17, 1978	Red Star Stadium, Belgrade, Serbia	
21	Win	20–1	John Baldwin	UD	10	May 24, 1978	Spectrum, Philadelphia, U.S.	
20	Win	19–1	Eddie Davis	TKO	7 (10), 1:24	Apr 3, 1978	Tyndall Armory, Indianapolis, U.S.	
19	Win	18–1	Roberto Reynosa	KO	1 (10), 1:15	Jan 25, 1978	Tyndall Armory, Indianapolis, U.S.	
18	Win	17–1	Billy Douglas	TKO	5 (10), 2:35	Nov 1, 1977	Spectrum, Philadelphia, U.S.	
17	Win	16–1	Johnny Fields	KO	1 (10), 2:52	Sep 28, 1977	Masonic Auditorium, Cleveland, U.S.	
16	Loss	15–1	Matthew Saad Muhammad	TKO	12 (12), 1:12	Jul 26, 1977	Spectrum, Philadelphia, U.S.	For NABF light heavyweight title
15	Win	15–0	Tom Bethea	TKO	4 (10), 2:50	Apr 22, 1977	Convention Exposition Center, Indianapolis, U.S.	
14	Win	14–0	Johnny Townsend	UD	10	Feb 21, 1977	Spectrum, Philadelphia, U.S.	
13	Win	13–0	Vandell Woods	UD	10	Nov 30, 1976	Spectrum, Philadelphia, U.S.	
12	Win	12–0	Wayne McGee	TKO	1 (10)	Sep 14, 1976	Spectrum, Philadelphia, U.S.	
11	Win	11–0	Harold Carter	KO	2 (10), 1:32	Apr 15, 1976	Indiana Roof Ballroom, Indianapolis, U.S.	
10	Win	10–0	Ray Anderson	TKO	6 (10), 1:50	Apr 3, 1976	Fairgrounds Coliseum, Indianapolis, U.S.	
9	Win	9–0	Eddie Owens	KO	3 (10), 1:00	Nov 13, 1975	Tyndall Armory, Indianapolis, U.S.	
8	Win	8–0	Paul Cardoza	TKO	5 (10), 1:35	Apr 17, 1975	Convention Exposition Center, Indianapolis, U.S.	
7	Win	7–0	Gary Summerhays	UD	10	Jan 29, 1975	Tyndall Armory, Indianapolis, U.S.	
6	Win	6–0	Jim Adams	TKO	1 (8), 2:48	Dec 11, 1974	Tyndall Armory, Indianapolis, U.S.	
5	Win	5–0	Johnny Words	TKO	6 (8), 2:40	Nov 12, 1974	Tyndall Armory, Indianapolis, U.S.	
4	Win	4–0	Ted Paxton	KO	2 (10), 1:58	Jul 17, 1974	High Chaparal, Chicago, U.S.	
3	Win	3–0	Chuck Warfield	TKO	5 (8)	Oct 30, 1973	Coliseum, Fort Wayne, U.S.	
2	Win	2–0	Al Byrd	TKO	1 (8), 1:36	Sep 17, 1973	Coliseum, Fort Wayne, U.S.	
1	Win	1–0	Sylvester Wilder	KO	2 (6), 1:30	May 22, 1973	Tyndall Armory, Indianapolis, U.S.	

== Life after boxing ==
Johnson retired from the Marion County Sheriff's Office in Indianapolis, Indiana, after more than 30 years of service as a civilian employee, correctional officer and deputy sheriff.

== See also ==
- List of world light-heavyweight boxing champions

Sporting positions
Amateur boxing titles
Previous: Nathaniel Jackson	U.S. light heavyweight champion 1971	Next: Hernando Molyneauz
Previous: Felton Wood	Golden Gloves light heavyweight champion 1971	Next: Verbie Garland
Previous: Jerry Dobbs	Golden Gloves; Middleweight champion 1972	Next: Roy Hollis
World boxing titles
Preceded by Mate Parlov	WBC light heavyweight champion December 2, 1978 - April 22, 1979	Succeeded by Matthew Saad Muhammad
Preceded by Víctor Galíndez	WBA light heavyweight champion November 30, 1979 - March 31, 1980	Succeeded by Eddie Mustafa Muhammad
Vacant Title last held by Michael Spinks	WBA light heavyweight champion February 9, 1986 - May 23, 1987	Succeeded by Leslie Stewart
Awards
Previous: Roberto Durán	The Ring Comeback of the Year; 1984	Next: Lupe Pintor
