= William Peets =

Virgin Islands boxer (born 1952)

Personal information
- Nationality: American Virgin Islander
- Born: August 23, 1952 (age 73)

Sport
- Sport: Boxing

William Peets (born August 23, 1952) is a former boxer who represented the United States Virgin Islands. He competed in the men's middleweight event at the 1972 Summer Olympics. Peets also represented the United States Virgin Islands at the 1971 Pan American Games. Peets was the flag bearer for the United States Virgin Islands in the opening ceremony of the 1972 Summer Olympics.
