= José Espinoza =

José Espinoza may refer to:

- José Ángel Espinoza (1919–2015), Mexican film actor and songwriter
- Jose Espinoza (jockey) (born 1969), jockey in American Thoroughbred horse racing
- José Espinoza (footballer) (born 1974), Peruvian football manager and former player
- José Espinoza (boxer) (born 1988), Venezuelan boxer

== See also ==
- José Espinosa (disambiguation)
