= José Martín Espinosa de los Monteros =

Spanish pilot and mathematics professor

José Martín y Espinosa de los Monteros was a Spanish pilot and a mathematics professor, founder of the lineage Espinosa in southeastern Mexico (Yucatan Peninsula).

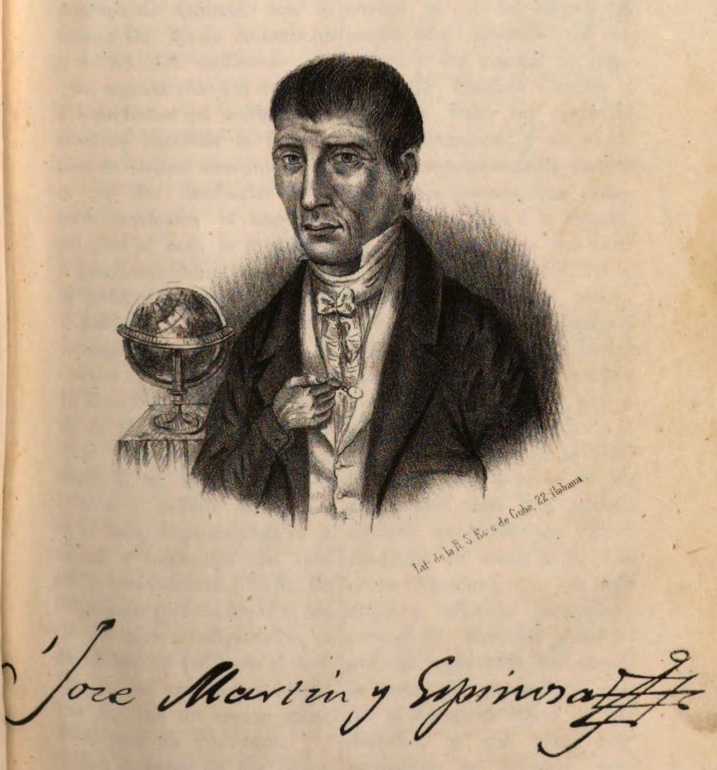
José Martín Espinosa de los Monteros

== History ==
José Martín y Espinosa de los Monteros was born in Malaga, Spain on 29 November 1776.

As a boy was orphaned. Under the protection of his uncle Félix Espinosa de los Monteros y Aliaga y de la Peña, entered the internship at the Real Colegio de San Telmo in Malaga where he received his education in "Mining, Artillery and Piloting".

After a full military career in the Spanish Navy, he became a "Piloto Mayor" in the Casa de Contratación. He was granted honorable discharge by royal decree for special services to the Spanish Crown. Then, he decided to settle in the city of Mérida, Department of Yucatan, then New Spain which now belongs to Mexico.

He devoted himself to public service participating as financier of the Province of Yucatan, administrating various charities, as an active member of the Council of Trade of Yucatan and being Synod of public examinations.

With an education instilled under the so-called "full Spanish illustration"; he developed himself in the fields of exact sciences as mathematician and astronomer, as a naturalist with special inclination to identify the peninsular flora and its possible uses, as a surveyor and cartographer, and in the graphic arts.

He died on 15 October 1845.
