= Prince Amartey =

Ghanaian boxer (1944–2022)

Olympic medal record

Men's boxing
Bronze medal – third place	1972 Munich	Middleweight

Prince Amartey (25 June 1944 – 23 September 2022) was a Ghanaian boxer, who won the bronze medal in the middleweight division (– 75 kg) at the 1972 Summer Olympics in Munich. He shared the podium with USA's Marvin Johnson. Previously, he competed in the light middleweight category at the 1968 Summer Olympics.

At the 1970 British Commonwealth Games, he lost his opening bout to Patrick Doherty of Northern Ireland.

Amartey also participated in the World Armed Forces Games in Rotterdam in 1971.

In 2015, it was reported that he was working as a sweeper at a private health facility in Ho and that he often wandered on the streets as a hungry man and a pauper. His problems began in 1974 when Amartey was dismissed from the Ghana Army as a result of mental health problems when he held the rank of corporal. Amartey then took up menial jobs in order to survive.

In March 2021, he received some items and an undisclosed amount from a Ho-based social club called Club 50. The items included toiletries and sanitation items.

In 2021, the GAF set up a business for Prince to take care of his needs. The Ghana Armed Forces opened a provision store at the Ho barracks. The store was commissioned on 5 August 2021 and was handed over to his family.
