= Hans-Joachim Brauske =

German boxer (1943–2025)

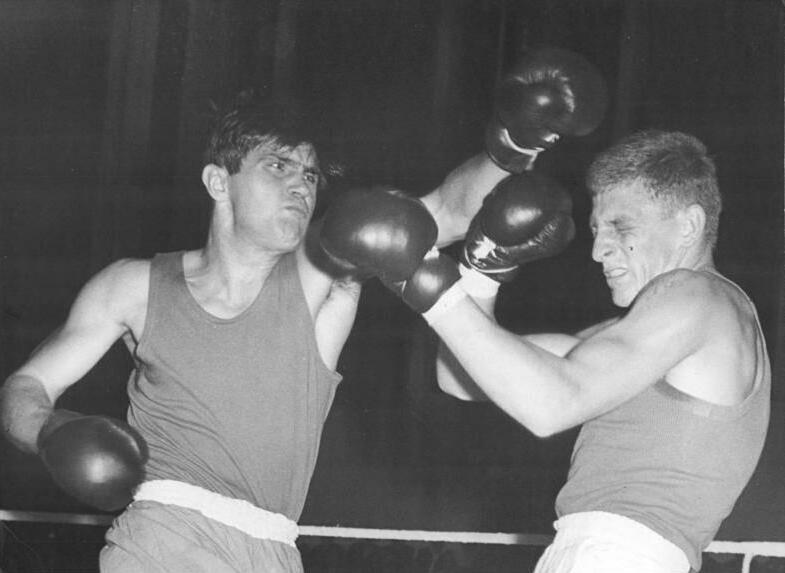
- Brauske (right) in a boxing match against Hungarian boxer Jozsef Karpati (left) in 1963

Personal information
- Nationality: German
- Born: 12 October 1943; Lauchhammer, Province of Saxony, Prussia, Germany
- Died: 11 January 2025 (aged 81)

Sport
- Sport: Boxing

Hans-Joachim Brauske (12 October 1943 – 11 January 2025) was a German boxer. He competed in the men's middleweight event at the 1972 Summer Olympics.
