= Crazy Nights =

Studio album by Kiss
- Released: September 18, 1987
- Recorded: March–June 1987
- Studios: Can-AM Recorders (Tarzana); One on One (Hollywood); Rumbo Recorders (Los Angeles)
- Genres: Pop metal; pop rock
- Length: 42:58
- Label: Mercury
- Producer: Ron Nevison

Kiss chronology
Asylum (1985)	Crazy Nights (1987)	Chikara (1988)

Singles from Crazy Nights
- 1. "Crazy Crazy Nights" Released: August 31, 1987; 2. "Reason to Live" Released: November 1, 1987; 3. "Turn On the Night" Released: February 27, 1988

Crazy Nights is the fourteenth studio album by American rock band Kiss, recorded from March to June 1987 and released on September 21, 1987, by Mercury worldwide and Vertigo in the UK. This was the second album to feature the line-up of Gene Simmons, Paul Stanley, Bruce Kulick, and Eric Carr. The album is notable for its pop-metal sound as well as for its use of keyboards and synthesizers, a reflection of popular trends in the commercial rock genre of this time. It was re-released in 1998 as part of the Kiss Remasters series and is the last Kiss album to have been remastered.

A high number of songs from Crazy Nights were performed live during its supporting tour, but during and especially following the tour, most of those songs were dropped and never performed again. Only the song "Crazy Crazy Nights" was retained in their setlist for the Hot in the Shade Tour a couple of years later; it was dropped after that tour, not returning for nearly 20 years until the Sonic Boom Over Europe Tour. This makes the album one of the least represented in the bands' entire catalog throughout their career in their setlists, behind only Music from "The Elder" and Carnival of Souls: The Final Sessions.

== Composition and recording ==
Kiss took a different approach in creating Crazy Nights, to turn around their image after they had a downfall in their music career due to experimentation of the band's music genre and the loss of two prime members. The band had a lot to prove after their decline of success. Since the time of recording Asylum, Kiss were also under new management representation with Larry Mazur, a consultant.

After the Asylum Tour had ended, Kiss went on a couple of months hiatus due to Gene Simmons' career as an actor and a producer, which made the band seem like his side job instead of his primary job. For Kisstory, Paul Stanley stated that he got tired of Simmons's lack of commitment and one day told him:

We were in the parking lot one day, and I said to Gene, 'Look, you're off doing all these other things while still reaping the benefits of this band—and I'm getting screwed. It's not fair for me to put in this kind of time, while somebody else who is supposed to be my partner, is not.' And Gene looked at me and said,'That's fair.' I could have used Gene's input. But my attitude at that point was that I certainly wasn't going to listen to a guy who's off managing cabaret singers and producing five bands, while I was trying to make an album.

Simmons' temporary departure gave space to Eric Carr and Bruce Kulick. Kulick had four co-writing credits and Carr one, but almost got other material on the album. Stanley had worked with Desmond Child, Diane Warren and Adam Mitchell and co-wrote songs: "Crazy Crazy Nights", "I'll Fight Hell to Hold You" and "When Your Walls Come Down" with Mitchell ("I'll Fight Hell to Hold You" and "When Your Walls Come Down" with Kulick), "Bang Bang You", "My Way" and "Reason to Live" with Child ("My Way" with Bruce Turgon also), and "Turn On the Night" was co-written by Stanley and Warren.

As Kiss' previous two albums had been self-produced, the band felt it needed to bring in an outside producer who would help the album achieve more commercial success. Producer Ron Nevison was hired to produce the album, but because of Nevison's filled schedule, the band had to wait for his schedule to clear. Nevison was chosen in part from his recent commercial success in producing platinum albums for Heart and Ozzy Osbourne. Simmons said for KISStory, "When we started working on Crazy Nights, we looked for someone else to pull the cart, another person to help guide the band... So we hooked up with a producer named Ron Nevison, who[m] Paul had wanted to work with for a while, although I never did." In the "Crazy Nights, it's 25 years strong" KissFAQ interview, Nevison describes the efforts band members put into the album: “Well, this was the only album I did with them. I do know that Gene wasn’t there all the time. Obviously, Bruce was and, to some extent, Eric. Mostly, a majority of the work on that album I did with Bruce and Paul. The bass tracks were cut initially, and Gene was only needed for lead vocals. I must say that most of the time he was there, he was in the back of the studio reading Variety." Although Simmons' participation was low for the album, he did contribute in providing Nevison with 20–25 songs that were potential material for the album, including one song called "I'm Going to Put a Log in Your Fire Place", which was ultimately not used on this or any subsequent albums.

The album was at first called "Who Dares Wins", which was Carr's idea. According to him, "During a photo session, our wardrobe girl had this commando patch lying around with 'Who Dares Wins' on it, and I said, 'Hey, what a great idea for an album title!' Then she brought it over to Paul who said the same thing. We ended up not using it because it didn't look good in print, and it sounded as if no one would understand it." The idea was dropped in June but managed to appear on some Japanese advertisements for the upcoming album. Another title the band thought of was "Condomnation", but as Stanley said, "Well, 'Condomnation' was never really the title. It was just a thought that passed through our minds and gave everyone a chuckle." The recording sessions started in March at One on One Recording Studios in Canoga Park, California, but later continued at Rumbo Recorders, also in Canoga Park, and Can-Am Recorders in Tarzana, California. In June the album was completed, and it was mixed at Can-Am Recorders by Nevison, before being turned over to PolyGram in July.

In his 2014 biography Face the Music, Stanley claims that Carr had stopped speaking to him during the tour for Crazy Nights. Stanley eventually sat down with Carr and insisted that the "non-communicative bullshit" had to end, which it did. Stanley claimed that Carr had started to drink more and may have been doing drugs by the late 1980s, which may have been causing his unhappiness. Stanley also claimed that Carr had started to obsess over not being the original drummer for Kiss, which he said Carr also did during the 1980 Australia tour.

== Songs ==
"Crazy Crazy Nights"

"Crazy Crazy Nights" was the first single from the album and reached No. 65 on Billboard Hot 100 and No. 37 on the Mainstream Rock Tracks. The song was a massive hit in the UK where it reached No. 4 and, to date, is Kiss' joint highest-charting single in the UK along with "God Gave Rock 'n' Roll to You II". "Crazy Crazy Nights" also went into the Top 40 in Norway, the Netherlands and Australia.

"I'll Fight Hell to Hold You"

Adam Mitchell reportedly plays on the song along with Bruce Kulick.

"Bang Bang You"

According to Paul Stanley, "Bang Bang You" is "the classic story of boys and their toys."
Love Gun from 1977 is referenced in the lyrics.

"No, No, No"

"No, No, No", was originally titled "Assume the Position" and later "Down on All Fours". It was based on Kulick's riff which was originally engineered and mixed by Bruce's long time friend NYC Record Plant engineer Ira Hoch in Ira's home studio. The tracks consisted of a stereo drum mix lifted from a prior Kiss album (originally played by Eric Carr), otherwise Bruce plays bass and all guitars with Ira doing the recording and stereo bounce from a 4 track Tascam 244 to a Teac 1/4" stereo reel to reel and back to the Tascam 244 to allow for the recording of two more guitar parts. The demo was then given to Gene Simmons, who wrote the lyrics. The song was released as the "B" side of the first single "Crazy Crazy Nights". It is Kulick's favorite song because "It's the fastest, ferocious thing, and it features me a lot."

"Reason to Live"

Stanley recalled when he played the "Reason to Live" demo to Simmons, "I remember calling up Gene and playing it to him down the phone... I played the song to Gene, and obviously, the bomb had gone off at the other end. He was speechless." Stanley was always okay with having power ballads on Kiss albums, which first started with "I Still Love You" on Creatures of the Night. Stanley also said, "If a band was, to be honest, they would tell you that at that time, the only hope for airplay was a ballad." A music video, directed by Marty Callner, was made and featured Playboy centerfold, Eloise Broady. "Reason to Live" reached No. 64 Billboard Hot 100, No. 34 on the Mainstream Rock Tracks and No. 33 in the UK. The song also managed to chart in the Netherlands, reaching No. 89. The music video for the song was a big hit on MTV in early 1988, regularly appearing as the top requested video on Dial MTV.

"Good Girl Gone Bad"

"Good Girl Gone Bad" was written by Simmons, friend Davitt Sigerson, and his songwriting partner Peter Diggins, whom Simmons never met. The song was lyrically based on something obvious from Simmons's community college period: "A young lady who Gene went to college with, a girl who started out the demure virgin, all coy and unclaimed...then met up with 'The Tongue'! The only sad thing about the tale is that when she finally did give way, it was in the backseat of a car—and with someone else, a friend of Gene's, in fact."

"Turn On the Night"

"Turn On the Night" was the third single off the album. A music video directed by Marty Callner was made in Worcester, Massachusetts on January 27, 1988. "Turn On the Night" only charted in the UK, where it reached No. 41.

"Thief in the Night"

"Thief in the Night" was first recorded by Wendy O. Williams on her 1984 solo album WOW.

== Unreleased songs ==
A few other songs were recorded for the album, but not included. Kulick, Child and Stanley wrote a song called "Sword and Stone" that did not manage to get on the album because Nevison was not thrilled with the song. Kulick later stated, "I just felt really bad that Ron Nevison didn't like the song 'cause then it would have been on Crazy Nights. But I couldn't control that. And the demo that is out there in bootleg form is pretty good. We did it at Electric Lady with Eric Carr, and it's a full-blown KISS track practically. I actually came up with that riff backstage on tour early on, Asylum, I think. That's what happens. Paul didn't mind as much; I felt pretty bad about that." The song was offered to Canadian rock band Loverboy, and was re-recorded by their lead guitarist Paul Dean on his 1988 album Hard Core. The song was also recorded by German heavy metal band Bonfire for a Wes Craven movie, Shocker.

Carr, Simmons and Mitchell wrote, "Dial 'L' for Love". Carr, who sang the song, was the primary writer, and he later passed it to Simmons and Mitchell who completed it. As Carr stated, "The song wasn't good at the time, so it didn't get on the album." A demo was made, but it did not include completed vocals. An instrumental recording of "Dial 'L' for Love" would be released on Unfinished Business in 2011.

"Are You Always This Hot" is a song written by Simmons and Mitchell. In the 1980s, Simmons had the ritual of making new songs that are based on some older songs, or simply spoken, he recycled them. And "Are You Always This Hot" is one of them. It was first written by Mitchell in 1981. The Simmons demo was only released in 2017 on the box set Gene Simmons Vault. The song "Time Traveler" was recorded during these sessions and later released on the 2001 KISS Box Set. Some other songs that were written for the album, but never made it, are "Boomerang", "'X' Marks the Spot", "Scratch and Sniff", "What Goes Up", "Hunger for Love", "Dirty Blonde", "Don't Let Go" and "No Mercy", although "Boomerang" would be later featured on Hot in the Shade.

== Reception ==
Professional ratings
Review scores
Source	Rating
AllMusic	1.5/5 stars
Collector's Guide to Heavy Metal	3/10
Encyclopedia of Popular Music	3/5 stars
Hi-Fi News & Record Review	A:2
New Musical Express	2/10
Q	3/5 stars
Rolling Stone	1/5 stars
The Rolling Stone Album Guide	2/5 stars

"While their melodies continue to be quarried from stone, their lyrics are written in lipstick," wrote Emily Fraser in a three-star Q review. "The riffs often have purpose and force and, in the cases of 'No No No' and 'Thief in the Night', a keen, cutting edge." "Not aesthetically wonderful," observed Fred Dellar in Hi-Fi News & Record Review, "but I wish I had shares in it."

Crazy Nights peaked at No. 18 on the US Billboard 200 chart, making it the highest-charting Kiss album of the 1980s in the US. It was certified platinum on November 18, 1987, in Canada and a few months later in the US, on February 18, 1988. All three singles off the album had corresponding videos that received heavy rotation on MTV, and were also featured on the Crazy Nights home video. The most successful single was "Crazy Crazy Nights", charting in five countries, and the least successful was "Turn On the Night", charting only in the UK.

The album was very well received by executives at Polygram Records. It was widely reported that during a meeting in which the album was played for them in full, the entire conference room reportedly stood and applauded for a full five minutes afterward. The excitement was enough for the corporate team to promote the album well past platinum status, cementing its reputation as one of the benchmarks of 1980's corporate rock.

== Track listing ==
All credits adapted from the original release. All lead vocals by Paul Stanley except noted.

Side one
No.	Title	Writer(s)	Lead vocals	Length
1.	"Crazy Crazy Nights"	Paul Stanley, Adam Mitchell		3:47
2.	"I'll Fight Hell to Hold You"	Stanley, Mitchell, Bruce Kulick		4:10
3.	"Bang Bang You"	Stanley, Desmond Child		3:53
4.	"No, No, No"	Gene Simmons, Kulick, Eric Carr	Simmons	4:19
5.	"Hell or High Water"	Simmons, Kulick	Simmons	3:28
6.	"My Way"	Stanley, Child, Bruce Turgon		3:58

Side two
No.	Title	Writer(s)	Lead vocals	Length
7.	"When Your Walls Come Down"	Stanley, Mitchell, Kulick		3:25
8.	"Reason to Live"	Stanley, Child		4:00
9.	"Good Girl Gone Bad"	Simmons, Davitt Sigerson, Peter Diggins	Simmons	4:35
10.	"Turn On the Night"	Stanley, Diane Warren		3:18
11.	"Thief in the Night"	Simmons, Mitch Weissman	Simmons	4:07

== Personnel ==
Kiss

- Paul Stanley – vocals, rhythm guitar, keyboards
- Gene Simmons – bass, vocals
- Eric Carr – drums, percussion, backing vocals
- Bruce Kulick – lead guitar, all guitars on "No, No, No", bass on "Hell or High Water", backing vocals

Additional musicians

- Phil Ashley – keyboards
- Tom Kelly – backing vocals

Production

- Ron Nevison – producer, engineer
- Toby Wright, Julian Stoll, Stan Katayama, Jeff Poe – assistant engineers
- Ted Jensen – mastering at Sterling Sound, New York
- Diandre Miller – producer assistant

== Charts ==
Chart (1987–1988)	Peak position
Australian Albums (Kent Music Report)	24
Canada Top Albums/CDs (RPM)	21
Dutch Albums (Album Top 100)	44
Finnish Albums (The Official Finnish Charts)	4
German Albums (Offizielle Top 100)	44
Japanese Albums (Oricon)	21
Norwegian Albums (VG-lista)	8
Swedish Albums (Sverigetopplistan)	11
Swiss Albums (Schweizer Hitparade)	14
UK Albums (Official Charts)	4
US Billboard 200	18

Chart (2026)	Peak position
Greek Albums (IFPI)	36

== Certifications ==
Region	Certification	Certified units/sales
Canada (Music Canada)	Platinum	100,000^{^}
Finland (Musiikkituottajat)	Gold	25,000
United Kingdom (BPI)	Gold	100,000^{^}
United States (RIAA)	Platinum	1,000,000^{^}
^{^} Shipments figures based on certification alone.
