= Rozstání (Svitavy District) =

- Municipality
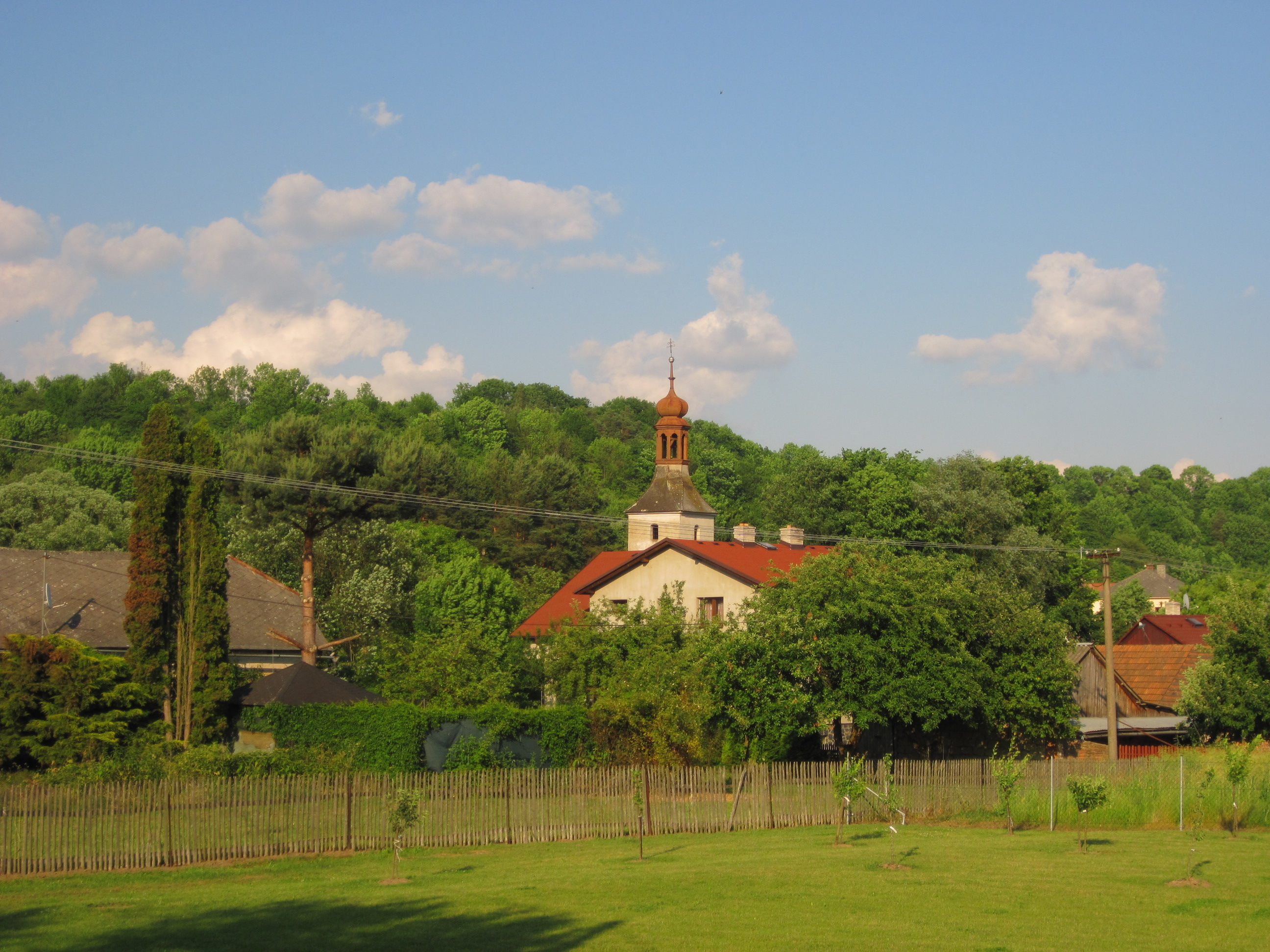
- View towards Rozstání

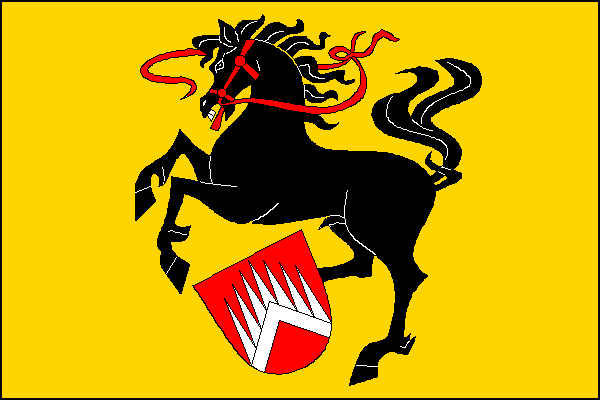
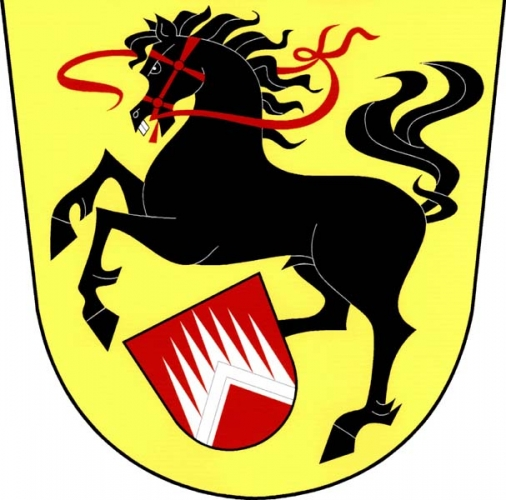
- Flag Coat of arms

- Location in the Czech Republic
- Coordinates: 49°44′6″N 16°43′12″E
- Country: Czech Republic
- Region: Pardubice
- District: Svitavy
- First mentioned: 1365

Area
  - Total: 7.40 km^{2} (2.86 sq mi)
- Elevation: 361 m (1,184 ft)

Population (2026-01-01)
  - Total: 263
  - Density: 35.5/km^{2} (92.0/sq mi)
- Time zone: UTC+1 (CET)
  - Summer (DST): UTC+2 (CEST)
- Postal code: 571 01
- Website: www.rozstani.com

Rozstání (German: Rostitz) is a municipality and village in Svitavy District in the Pardubice Region of the Czech Republic. It has about 300 inhabitants.

Rozstání lies approximately 18 kilometres (11 mi) east of Svitavy, 75 km (47 mi) south-east of Pardubice, and 169 km (105 mi) east of Prague.

== Demographics ==
Historical population
Year	Pop.	±%
1869	577	—
1880	579	+0.3%
1890	524	−9.5%
1900	508	−3.1%
1910	506	−0.4%
1921	519	+2.6%
1930	458	−11.8%
1950	359	−21.6%
1961	335	−6.7%
1970	298	−11.0%
1980	228	−23.5%
1991	214	−6.1%
2001	226	+5.6%
2011	256	+13.3%
2021	239	−6.6%
Source: Censuses

== Notable people ==
- Ewald Jarmer (born 1942), German boxer
