= Rozstání (Světlá pod Ještědem) =

- Village
- Location within Czech Republic
- Coordinates: 50°42′37″N 14°58′24″E
- Country: Czech Republic
- Region: Liberec
- District: Liberec

Population (2001)
  - Total: 331
- Postal code: 463 43

Rozstání is a town in the Liberec Region, Czech Republic.
