= Tony Sibson =

English boxer (born 1958)

Personal information
- Born: 9 April 1958 (age 68) Leicester, England
- Height: 171 cm (5 ft 7 in)

Boxing career
- Weight class: Middleweight; Light heavyweight
- Reach: 174 cm (69 in)
- Stance: Orthodox

Boxing record
- Total fights: 64
- Wins: 55
- Win by KO: 31
- Losses: 7
- Draws: 1

Tony Sibson (born 9 April 1958) is an English former professional boxer who competed from 1976 to 1988.

== Boxing career ==
Tony Sibson was Commonwealth and European champion and a three-time world title challenger. His speed coupled with rugged power enabled him to be ranked as one of the best middleweights in the world and ultimately challenge Marvin Hagler for his world crown.

A middleweight, Sibson fought during the 1970s and 1980s, winning 55 of his 63 bouts, including 31 by knockout. He fought Marvin Hagler for the WBA and WBC middleweight titles in February 1983, losing by a technical knockout in the sixth round. Sibson later moved up to light heavyweight and lost to Dennis Andries in a bout for the WBC title in 1986. Two years later he challenged Frank Tate for the IBF middleweight title, this time losing by a 10th-round TKO.

== Professional boxing record ==
55 Wins (31 knockouts, 24 decisions), 7 Losses (5 knockouts, 2 decisions), 1 Draw
Result	Record	Opponent	Type	Round	Date	Location	Notes
Loss	55–7-1	Frank Tate	TKO	10	7 Feb 1988	Stafford, England	IBF Middleweight Title. Referee stopped the bout at 2:53 of the tenth round.
Win	55–6–1	Brian Anderson	TKO	7	16 Sep 1987	London, England	BBBofC British/Commonwealth Middleweight Titles.
Loss	54–6–1	Dennis Andries	TKO	9	10 Sep 1986	London, England	BBBofC British/WBC World Light Heavyweight Titles. Referee stopped the bout at 2:04 of the ninth round.
Win	54–5-1	Luis Jose Rivera	PTS	10	16 Apr 1986	London, England	
Win	53–5-1	Abdul Umaru Sanda	PTS	12	19 Mar 1986	London, England	Commonwealth Middleweight Title.
Win	52–5–1	Juan Elizondo	KO	2	22 Jan 1986	London, England	Elizondo knocked out at 0:47 of the second round.
Win	51–5-1	Mark Kaylor	UD	12	27 Nov 1984	London, England	BBBofC British/Commonwealth/EBU Middleweight Titles.
Win	50–5-1	Louis Acaries	PTS	12	25 Feb 1984	Paris, France	EBU Middleweight Title.
Loss	49–5–1	Don Lee	TKO	8	15 Jan 1984	Atlantic City, New Jersey, U.S.	Referee stopped the bout at 2:13 of the eighth round.
Win	49–4-1	Manuel Jiminez	TKO	8	22 Nov 1983	London, England	Referee stopped the bout at 2:25 of the eighth round.
Win	48–4-1	John Collins	TKO	2	8 Oct 1983	Atlantic City, New Jersey, U.S.	Referee stopped the bout at 0:36 of the second round.
Loss	47–4–1	Marvin Hagler	TKO	6	11 Feb 1983	Worcester, Massachusetts, U.S.	WBC/WBA World Middleweight Titles. Referee stopped the bout at 2:40 of the sixth round.
Win	47–3–1	Antonio Alejandro Garrido	RTD	8	14 Sep 1982	London, England	
Win	46–3–1	Jacques Chinon	TKO	10	4 May 1982	London, England	EBU Middleweight Title.
Win	45–3-1	Dwight Davison	PTS	12	21 Feb 1982	Birmingham, England	
Win	44–3-1	Nicola Cirelli	KO	10	24 Nov 1981	London, England	EBU Middleweight Title.
Win	43–3-1	Alan Minter	TKO	3	15 Sep 1981	London, England	EBU Middleweight Title. Referee stopped the bout at 1:59 of the third round.
Win	42–3-1	Andoni Amana	PTS	12	14 May 1981	Bilbao, Spain	EBU Middleweight Title.
Win	41–3–1	Andre Mongelema	PTS	10	17 Mar 1981	London, England	
Win	40–3–1	Norberto Cabrera	PTS	10	27 Jan 1981	London, England	
Win	39–3-1	Matteo Salvemini	KO	7	8 Dec 1980	London, England	EBU Middleweight Title.
Win	38–3–1	Bobby Coolidge	KO	7	27 Sep 1980	London, England	Coolidge knocked out at 1:50 of the seventh round.
Win	37–3–1	Marciano Bernardi	PTS	10	3 Jun 1980	London, England	
Win	36–3-1	Chisanda Mutti	PTS	15	4 Mar 1980	London, England	Commonwealth Middleweight Title.
Win	35–3–1	James Waire	PTS	10	22 Jan 1980	London, England	
Win	34–3-1	Robert Powell	TKO	1	29 Nov 1979	Liverpool, England	
Loss	33–3-1	Kevin Finnegan	PTS	15	6 Nov 1979	London, England	BBBofC British Middleweight Title.
Win	33–2–1	Willie Classen	KO	2	9 Oct 1979	London, England	
Win	32–2–1	Jacques Chinon	TKO	8	26 Jun 1979	Leicester, England	
Win	31–2–1	Al Clay	TKO	7	15 May 1979	London, England	
Win	30–2-1	Frankie Lucas	TKO	5	10 Apr 1979	London, England	BBBofC British Middleweight Title.
Win	29–2–1	Eddie Smith	PTS	10	5 Mar 1979	Wolverhampton, England	
Win	28–2–1	Gerard Nosley	TKO	7	7 Nov 1978	London, England	
Loss	27–2–1	Eddie Smith	PTS	8	24 Oct 1978	London, England	
Win	27–1–1	Keith Bussey	TKO	8	12 Sep 1978	London, England	
Win	26–1-1	Bonny McKenzie	PTS	8	18 Jul 1978	Wakefield, England	
Win	25–1–1	Danny McLoughlin	KO	3	29 Jun 1978	Wolverhampton, England	
Loss	24–1-1	Lottie Mwale	KO	1	23 May 1978	Leicester, England	
Win	24-0–1	Mac Nicholson	TKO	1	25 Apr 1978	London, England	
Win	23–0-1	Steve Walker	TKO	5	4 Apr 1978	Wolverhampton, England	
Win	22-0-1	Mac Nicholson	TKO	7	31 Mar 1978	Liverpool, England	
Win	21–0-1	Errol McKenzie	KO	2	6 Mar 1978	Wolverhampton, England	
Win	20–0–1	John Smith	KO	5	23 Jan 1978	Wolverhampton, England	
Win	19–0–1	Oscar Angus	TKO	6	30 Nov 1977	Wolverhampton, England	
Win	18–0–1	Wayne Bennett	PTS	8	8 Nov 1977	West Bromwich, England	
Draw	17–0–1	Pat Thomas	PTS	8	18 Oct 1977	Wolverhampton, England	
Win	17-0	Sonny Kamunga	PTS	8	27 Apr 1977	Leicester, England	
Win	16–0	Tony Burnett	PTS	8	21 Apr 1977	Liverpool, England	
Win	15–0	Steve Walker	PTS	8	7 Apr 1977	Dudley, England	
Win	14-0	Bonny McKenzie	KO	7	24 Mar 1977	Leicester, England	
Win	13–0	Gareth Jones	KO	1	25 Feb 1977	Birmingham, England	
Win	12–0	Arthur Winfield	TKO	2	10 Feb 1977	Coventry, England	
Win	11–0	Roy Gumbs	PTS	8	19 Jan 1977	Solihull, England	
Win	10–0	Tony Burnett	PTS	8	11 Jan 1977	Wolverhampton, England	
Win	9–0	Tim McHugh	TKO	4	14 Dec 1976	West Bromwich, England	
Win	8–0	John Breen	TKO	5	30 Nov 1976	Dudley, England	
Win	7–0	Neville Esteban	PTS	8	3 Nov 1976	Caister-on-Sea, England	
Win	6-0	Clive Davidson	PTS	8	22 Oct 1976	Birmingham, England	
Win	5–0	Bonny McKenzie	TKO	7	10 Sep 1976	Birmingham, England	
Win	4–0	Jimmy Pickard	PTS	6	14 Jul 1976	Wolverhampton, England	
Win	3–0	Liam White	PTS	6	26 May 1976	Wolverhampton, England	
Win	2-0	John Breen	PTS	6	6 May 1976	Birmingham, England	
Win	1-0	Charlie Ricardson	TKO	2	9 Apr 1976	Birmingham, England	

== Post-boxing career ==
After retiring from boxing, Sibson focused on his family and his construction business in Leicester.

== See also ==
- List of British middleweight boxing champions
