= Reiðhöllin =

Indoor arena in Reykjavík, Iceland

Coordinates: 64.10215°N 21.79014°W

Reiðhöllin (Icelandic pronunciation: [ˈreiːðˌhœtlɪn]) is an indoor arena located in Reykjavík, Iceland, which is used primarily as an equestrian center. The hall is just over 1,800 m^{2} in size; 26 meters wide and 70 meters long. It has also hosted concerts, including performances by Kiss in 1988 and Whitesnake in 1990.
