= Turn On the Night =

Single by Kiss

from the album Crazy Nights
- B-side: "Hell or High Water"
- Released: February 27, 1988
- Recorded: 1987
- Genre: Glam metal
- Length: 3:45
- Label: Mercury (US)
- Songwriters: Paul Stanley, Diane Warren
- Producer: Ron Nevison

Kiss singles chronology
"Reason to Live" (1987)	"Turn On the Night" (1988)	"Let's Put the X in Sex" (1988)

Music video
- "Turn On the Night" on YouTube

"Turn On the Night" is a song by the American rock band Kiss from their 1987 studio album Crazy Nights. It was the album's third and final single.

== Background and writing ==
The song was written by Paul Stanley and Diane Warren. As she says, she hadn't written many hits at that time, but Paul Stanley believed in her. Stanley in his turn says that it was Warren who came up with the title for the song and that she played the key role in its writing. As of 2023, Kiss has never performed the song live.

== Musical style and lyrical theme ==
The Encyclopedia of Kiss describes the song as a "fine, fist-pumping pop rocket," "keyboard-heavy". Paul Stanley, who, in this song, "wants a particular girl more than any other guy," "sounds like the he's having a blast singing," the book adds.

== Music video ==
The music video was directed by Marty Callner. It was shot in Worcester, Massachusetts on January 27, 1988.

== Commercial performance ==
"Turn On the Night" didn't chart in the United States, but charted in the UK, where it reached No. 41. Diane Warren was cited to say that the song "should have been a bigger hit than it was".

== Charts ==
Chart (1988)	Peak position
UK Singles (Official Charts)	41
