= Nat Knowles =

Bahamian boxer (born 1948)

Personal information
- Nationality: Bahamian
- Born: 29 October 1948 (age 77)

Sport
- Sport: Boxing
Medal record
Men's amateur boxing
Representing Bahamas
Central American and Caribbean Games
Silver medal – second place	1974 Santo Domingo	Middleweight

Nat Knowles (born 29 October 1948) is a Bahamian boxer. He competed in the men's middleweight event at the 1972 Summer Olympics. Knowles won a silver medal at the 1974 Central American and Caribbean Games.
