= Gary Summerhays =

Canadian boxer (1950–2021)

Personal information
- Born: 1950 Brantford, Ontario, Canada
- Died: 19 October 2021 (aged 70–71)
- Weight: light heavy/cruiserweight

Boxing career
- Stance: Orthodox

Boxing record
- Total fights: 60
- Wins: 39 (KO 16)
- Losses: 17 (KO 2)
- Draws: 3
- No contests: 1

Gary Summerhays (1950 – 19 October 2021) was a Canadian professional light heavy/cruiserweight boxer of the 1970s and 1980s, who won the Canadian light heavyweight title and Commonwealth light heavyweight title. His professional fighting weight varied from light heavyweight to cruiserweight. Summerhays fought such fighters as Mike Quarry, Marvin Johnson, and Michael Spinks.

A two-time New York Golden Gloves winner, Summerhays captured the Canadian heavy-middleweight title (168 pounds) title in 1967 and the Canadian light-heavyweight belt (175 pounds) in 1973 when he defeated Al Sparks at Maple Leaf Gardens. He was also once the co-main event during a card with former world heavyweight champion Muhammad Ali, fighting in Madison Square Garden.

Summerhays was one of three brothers, all of whom had successful boxing careers. Older brother Terry was an accomplished amateur boxer who turned professional and was ranked third in the Canadian Welterweight Division. Younger brother John was also a professional boxer and never knocked out in his career. Together, the brothers are the only set of three brothers to box on the same night on a card at Madison Square Garden, doing so in 1974.

Summerhays died on 19 October 2021.
