= Reason to Live =

"Reason To Live"

Single by Kiss

from the album Crazy Nights
- Released: November 12, 1987 (US)
- Recorded: 1987
- Studio: One on One (Los Angeles)
- Genre: Pop metal, power ballad
- Length: 4:00
- Label: Mercury
- Songwriters: Paul Stanley, Desmond Child
- Producer: Ron Nevison

Kiss singles chronology
"Crazy Crazy Nights" / "No, No, No" (1987)	"Reason to Live" / "Thief in the Night" (1987)	"Turn On the Night" / "Hell or High Water" (1988)

Music video
- "Reason to Live" on YouTube

"Reason to Live" is a song by the American rock band Kiss. It is featured on the band's 1987 studio album Crazy Nights.

== Background ==
Written by singer/guitarist Paul Stanley and professional songwriter Desmond Child, "Reason to Live" is a power ballad, heavy on keyboards and production. The B-side is the Gene Simmons-helmed album track "Thief in the Night".

== Music video ==
The song's official music video was directed by Marty Callner and produced by Callner, Doug Major and Bill Brigode. It received airplay on MTV.

The video shows the band playing the song live on a large, well-lit stage, interspersed with shots of a young blonde woman (portrayed by Playboy Playmate and model Eloise Broady), who is visibly distressed over relationship troubles with Stanley. She vents her frustrations by throwing a wine bottle at a picture of the two of them and then burning it at the end of the video. When Stanley visits her house, she comes out of hiding and douses his Porsche 928 with gasoline before setting it on fire. It is implied that Stanley ended the relationship with the woman due to her unstable behavior.

The band performance portion of the video was filmed in the Orange Pavilion in San Bernardino, California, while the scenes of the woman as well as her house were shot in Hollywood, California. The Porsche in the video was a gift from Simmons to Stanley, in appreciation of the latter's dedication to the band. Simmons' bass bears an image of him in his classic "Demon" makeup.

== Personnel ==
- Paul Stanley: lead vocals, rhythm guitar;
- Bruce Kulick: lead guitar;
- Gene Simmons: bass guitar;
- Eric Carr: drums;

Additional musicians

- Phil Ashley: keyboards;

== Chart performance ==
Released as a single in 1987, the song would prove to be a minor hit for the band. It made the Top 40 charts in the United Kingdom, and reached number 34 on Billboard's Hot Mainstream Rock Tracks It also peaked at the 64 position on the Billboard Hot 100 in the United States in early 1988.

== Charts ==
Chart (1987–1988)	Peak position
Australian Singles (Kent Music Report)	85
Netherlands (Single Top 100)	89
UK Singles (Official Charts)	33
US Billboard Hot 100	64
US Mainstream Rock (Billboard)	34
