= Witold Stachurski =

Polish boxer

Personal information
- Nationality: Polish
- Born: 15 January 1947 Chmielnik, Poland
- Died: 16 May 2001 (aged 54) Kielce, Poland

Sport
- Sport: Boxing
Medal record
Men's amateur boxing
Representing Poland
European Amateur Championships
| Silver medal – second place | 1967 Rome | Light Middleweight |
| Bronze medal – third place | 1973 Belgrad | Middleweight |

Witold Stachurski (15 January 1947 – 16 May 2001) was a Polish boxer. He competed at the 1968 Summer Olympics and the 1972 Summer Olympics.
