= José Luis Espinosa Piña =

Mexican politician

José Luis Espinosa Piña (born December 2, 1968) is a Mexican politician—belonging to the National Action Party (PAN)—and current Director-General of the Latin American Institute of Educational Communication (ILCE).

Espinosa Piña was born in Morelia, Michoacán. He studied law at Universidad Michoacana de San Nicolás de Hidalgo (one of Mexico’s top state-funded universities) from 1990 to 1995.

In 2006 he was elected by the 10th district of his native city, Morelia, to the Chamber of Deputies. Here he was appointed secretary to the Environment and Natural Resources committee, from which he fostered measures to deal with climate change both nationally and internationally. He actively participated in parliamentary diplomacy, which led him to build close ties with GLOBE International—an international organisation backed by the G8+5 and the World Bank whose mission is to tackle climate change globally by promoting legislation amongst national parliaments.

At the end of 2008 he was invited by Elliot Morley, the former GLOBE International’s President, to be part of the new International Commission on Climate and Energy Security that was launched in Washington DC to back the works of Lars Løkke Rasmussen, Prime Minister of Denmark, in advance of the Copenhagen Conference on Climate Change that would take place at the end of 2009. On June of that same year, during the GLOBE Rome Forum held in the Italian parliament, Espinosa was asked to give a speech regarding the Mexican Green Fund proposal. A few days later, Gordon Brown, Prime Minister of the United Kingdom, delivered a speech on the Roadmap to Copenhagen where he pointed to the Mexican Green Fund as an example of the kind of financial mechanisms that could be agreed upon in order to tackle climate change.

As part of his last legislative projects, Espinosa also conceived the idea to create GLOBE Mexico—a national branch of GLOBE International—within the Mexican Congress. However, because Mexican deputies serve for three years and there is no legislative re-election in Mexico, Espinosa had to leave his seat at the Chamber of Deputies on August 31, 2009.

On that same day, Espinosa was appointed Director-General of ILCE, an international organisation based in Mexico City that promotes education throughout Latin America by means of communication technologies and innovative pedagogical models. From his new position, Espinosa has continued supporting the works of GLOBE (Global Legislators Organisation for a Balanced Environment) — now as special adviser to this organisation— and the formal establishment of GLOBE Mexico within both the Mexican Chamber of Deputies and Senate.
