= Nazif Kuran =

Turkish boxer (born 1945)

Personal information
- Nationality: Turkish
- Born: 20 May 1945 (age 79)

Sport
- Sport: Boxing

Nazif Kuran (born 20 May 1945) is a Turkish boxer. He competed in the men's middleweight event at the 1972 Summer Olympics.
