= José Luis Espinosa (boxer) =

Mexican boxer (born 1941)

Personal information
- Full name: José Luis Espinosa Mares
- Nationality: Mexican
- Born: 19 January 1941 (age 84)

Sport
- Sport: Boxing

José Luis Espinosa Mares (born 19 January 1941) is a Mexican boxer. He competed in the men's middleweight event at the 1972 Summer Olympics.
