= Crazy Crazy Nights =

1987 single by Kiss

Single by Kiss

from the album Crazy Nights
- B-side: "No, No, No"
- Released: August 31, 1987
- Studio: One on One (Canoga Park, California)
- Genre: Glam metal
- Length: 3:45
- Label: Mercury
- Songwriters: Paul Stanley; Adam Mitchell
- Producer: Ron Nevison

Kiss singles chronology
"Tears Are Falling" / "Any Way You Slice It" (1985)	"Crazy Crazy Nights" / "No, No, No" (1987)	"Reason to Live" / "Thief in the Night" (1987)

Music video
- "Crazy Crazy Nights" on YouTube

"Crazy Crazy Nights" is a song by American rock band Kiss. It was originally released on the band's 1987 album Crazy Nights. Although it peaked at only number 65 on the US Billboard Hot 100, the song became the band's highest-charting single in the United Kingdom (alongside "God Gave Rock 'n' Roll to You II"), peaking at number four on the UK Singles Chart. In August 2019, it received a Silver certification from the British Phonographic Industry for sales and streams exceeding 200,000. The song also reached the top 10 in Ireland and Norway.

== Chart performance ==
The single peaked at number 65 on the Billboard Hot 100 in the United States on October 31, 1987, and at number 37 on Billboard's Album Rock Tracks chart. "Crazy Crazy Nights" was more commercially successful in the United Kingdom, as it peaked at number four, proving to be Kiss's first top-ten single in the UK. The song also reached number seven in Norway, number nine in Ireland, number 28 in the Netherlands and number 31 in Belgium.

== Music video ==
A music video was directed by Jean Pellerin and Doug Freel. It was filmed on August 8, 1987, at the Olympic Auditorium in Los Angeles, CA. The video shows the band performing on a giant stage in front of a crowd.

The Kiss fans that were present that day got free tickets through the radio station KNAC. During the filming, the fans would party between takes to maintain the energy of the setting and event. The band also gave the audience a mini concert where they played some of their singles like "Cold Gin", "Lick It Up", "Detroit Rock City", and "Whole Lotta Love".

It was featured in the "Crazy Nights" home video.

== Personnel ==
- Paul Stanley – lead vocals, rhythm guitar
- Gene Simmons – bass guitar, backing vocals
- Eric Carr – drums, percussion, backing vocals
- Bruce Kulick – lead guitar, backing vocals

== Charts ==
=== Weekly charts ===
Chart (1987)	Peak position
Belgium (Ultratop 50 Flanders)	31
Europe (European Hot 100 Singles)	43
Ireland (IRMA)	9
Netherlands (Dutch Top 40)	35
Netherlands (Single Top 100)	28
Norway (VG-lista)	7
UK Singles (Official Charts)	4
US Billboard Hot 100	65
US Mainstream Rock (Billboard)	37

=== Year-end charts ===
Chart (1987)	Position
UK Singles (OCC)	91

== Certifications ==
Region	Certification	Certified units/sales
United Kingdom (BPI)	Gold	400,000^{‡}
^{‡} Sales+streaming figures based on certification alone.

== In popular culture ==
Darts players Wes Newton and Jeff Smith use the song as their walk-on song.
