= Hakamada =

Hakamada (written: 袴田) is a Japanese surname. Notable people with the surname include:

- Irina Khakamada (袴田イリーナ; Ирина Хакамада; born 1955), Russian politician of Japanese origin
- Iwao Hakamada (袴田 巖; born 1936), correctly transliterated Hakamata, Japanese former death row prisoner
- Yoshihiko Hakamada (袴田 吉彦; born 1973), Japanese actor
