= Sadamichi Hirasawa =

Japanese artist (1892–1987)

- 平沢 貞通
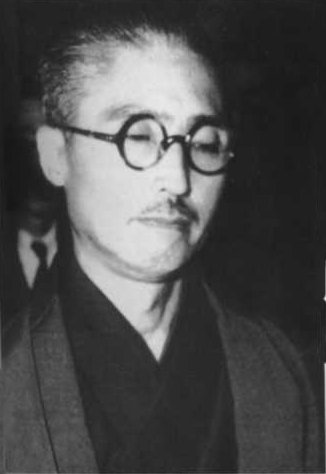
- Sadamichi Hirasawa in 1951
- Born: February 18, 1892
- Died: May 10, 1987 (aged 95)
- Occupation: Tempera painter
- Known for: Long stay on death row
- Criminal charges: Mass poisoning
- Criminal penalty: Death

Sadamichi Hirasawa (平沢 貞通, Hirasawa Sadamichi; February 18, 1892 – May 10, 1987) was a Japanese tempera painter. He was convicted of mass poisoning and sentenced to death. Due to strong suspicions that he was innocent, no justice minister ever signed his death warrant.

== Teigin case ==
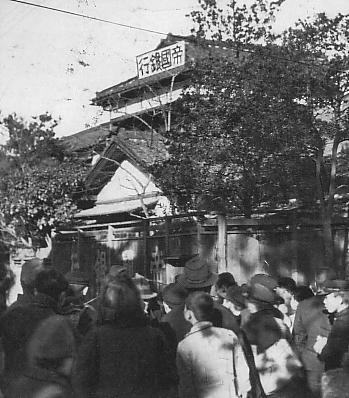
Site of the "Teikoku Bank Incident"

On January 26, 1948, a man calling himself an epidemiologist arrived at a branch of the Imperial Bank (Teikoku Ginkō, aka Teigin) in Shiinamachi, a suburb of Toshima, Tokyo, shortly before closing time. He explained that he was a public health official sent by US occupation authorities who had orders to inoculate the staff against a sudden outbreak of dysentery. He gave each of the sixteen people present a pill and a few drops of liquid. Those present drank the liquid he gave, which was later thought to be "nitrile hydrocyanide" (青酸ニトリール), an assassination toxicant originally developed at the Noborito Laboratory. When all were incapacitated, the robber took some money lying on the desks, which amounted to 160,000 yen (about $600 US at the time), but left the majority behind, leaving his motive unknown. Ten of the victims died at the scene (one was a child of an employee) and two others died while hospitalized.

== Arrest and trial ==
Hirasawa was caught by the police due to the Japanese habit of exchanging business cards with personal details. There had been two other extremely similar cases of attempted and actual theft at banks via the use of poison in the weeks and months before the robbery. In all cases the poisoner, a lone male, left a business card. The poisoner used a card which was marked "Jirō Yamaguchi" in one of the two incidents, but it was later found that said Yamaguchi did not exist: the card was a fake. The poisoner also used a real card which was marked "Shigeru Matsui" (of the Ministry of Health and Welfare, Department of Disease Prevention) in another of the two incidents. The original owner of the card was found to have an alibi. Matsui told the police that he had exchanged cards with 593 people, but of these, 100 were of the type used in the poisoning incidents, of which eight remained in his possession. Matsui recorded the time and place of the business card exchange on the back of cards he received so the police set out to trace the remaining 92 cards. 62 cards were retrieved and their originators cleared; a further 22 were deemed to have been irrelevant to the case. One of the remaining 8 cards was received by Hirasawa. The police were led to arrest Hirasawa because:

1. He could not produce the card he had received from Matsui. Hirasawa claimed to have lost the business card, together with his wallet, due to his having been the victim of pickpocketing.
2. A similar amount of money to that stolen from the bank was found in Hirasawa's possession, the origin of which he refused to divulge. The origin of the money is unknown to this day (though some, such as the crime fiction novelist Seichō Matsumoto, suggested Hirasawa received it by drawing pornographic pictures, a side business that would have been detrimental to Hirasawa's reputation as an artist).
3. Hirasawa's alibi of having been taking a stroll in the vicinity of the crime scene could be neither verified nor substantiated.
4. Hirasawa was identified as the poisoner by several witnesses (but only by two survivors, and see picture below).
5. He confessed to having been involved in four previous cases of bank fraud (recanted together with his subsequent confession).

He was arrested on August 21, 1948. After police interrogation, which allegedly involved torture, Hirasawa confessed, but then recanted soon after. His later defence against his confession was based on partial insanity, alleging that he had been troubled with Korsakoff's syndrome (as a result of rabies inoculation) and so his confession was not reliable. The court, however, disagreed and Hirasawa was sentenced to death in 1950. Until 1949, a confession was solid evidence under the law, even if the police tortured a person to extract said confession. The Supreme Court of Japan upheld the death sentence in 1955. His attorneys tried to have the sentence revoked, submitting 18 pleas for retrial over the following years.

== Doubt over guilty verdict ==
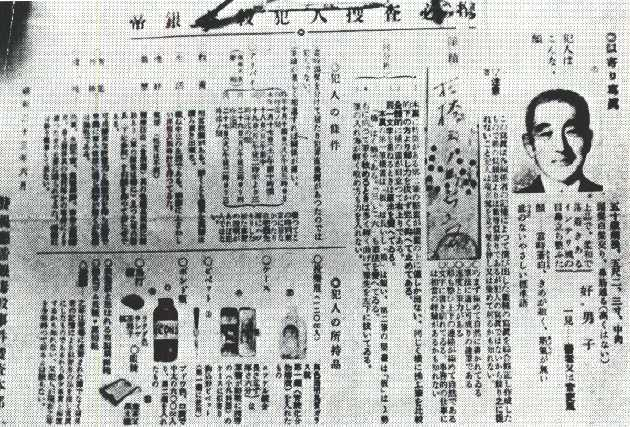
Japanese police made the montage picture of the criminal, but his face was clearly not similar to Hirasawa.

He was sentenced to death, but there was originally no conclusive evidence. In addition, although there were 40 witnesses to the crime, only two of the survivors identified Hirasawa as the criminal. Seichō Matsumoto presumed that the true culprit was a former member of Unit 731 in his books A Story of the Teikoku Bank Incident in 1959 and The Black Fog of Japan in 1960. Matsumoto also suspected that "the money of unknown origin" came from selling pornographic drawings. Kei Kumai protested Hirasawa's conviction with his film Teigin jiken: Shikeishû (Teigin Incident: Condemned / The Long Death) in 1964.

Successive Ministers of Justice in Japan did not sign his death warrant, so the death sentence was never carried out. Even Isaji Tanaka, who on 13 October 1967 announced in front of the press that he had signed the death warrants of 23 prisoners in one go, did not sign Hirasawa's death warrant, stating that he doubted Hirasawa's guilt.

The poison was regarded as the readily obtainable potassium cyanide in Hirasawa's trial. One of the reasons given to doubt Hirasawa's guilt is because the victims' symptoms were clearly different from potassium cyanide poisoning, which is rapid. Keio University's contemporary investigation claimed that the true poison may have been acetone cyanohydrin, a military poison deliberately designed to be slow-acting, which Hirasawa could not have obtained.

== Death in prison ==
Hirasawa remained in prison as a condemned criminal for the next 32 years. He spent his time painting and writing his autobiography My Will: the Teikoku Bank Case (遺書 帝銀事件).

In 1981, Makoto Endo became the leader of Hirasawa's lawyers. Beside this case, he took part in controversial trials such as that of Norio Nagayama. The defense claimed that statute of limitations for his death penalty ran out in 1985. The death penalty has a 30-year statute of limitations under the Criminal Code of Japan, and so Endo appealed for his release. However, the Japanese court refused this argument, pointing out that the statute only applies in the case if a death row inmate escapes from prison and evades capture for 30 years. Japanese courts judge that the punishment begins when the minister signs the death warrant, which had never been done. His health deteriorated in 1987. On April 30, 1987, Amnesty International petitioned the Japanese government to release him, but Hirasawa died of pneumonia in a prison hospital on May 10.

== Bids for a posthumous retrial ==
Even after Hirasawa's death, his son by adoption, Takehiko Hirasawa, tried to clear his name. Takehiko was the son of one of Sadamichi's supporters; he became the painter's adopted son while in university to take up the task of getting a retrial for Sadamichi, as his relatives were reluctant to pursue the case due to social prejudice. Takehiko also worked to recover several of Sadamichi's lost paintings and held exhibitions of his work. He and his lawyers submitted a 19th plea for retrial; Sadamichi's brain damage was also proved. As of 2008, his lawyers had submitted new evidence to attempt to prove Hirasawa's innocence.

In September 2013, Takehiko Hirasawa died alone at his home in Suginami Ward, Tokyo, aged 54; he had lived there with his natural mother until her death at age 83 the previous December. His body was only found on 16 October by several retrial supporters who had worried about not hearing from him in some time. According to supporters, the pressures and uncertainties surrounding the reopening of the case, together with his mother's death, had caused Takehiko to periodically display signs of instability and doubts about whether he could continue. He continued to persist with his objective of getting a posthumous retrial, though - writing after his mother's death on a website about the "Teigin Incident":

It was her wish and mine and my late father's to mark in history that Sadamichi Hirasawa is innocent. I will continue this struggle for years to come.

At the time of Takehiko's death, he and his lawyers had assembled a team of psychologists to reexamine the witness accounts and investigation process from the trial, to determine if the evidence was credible by present standards. They had been scheduled to submit their position papers to the Tokyo High Court by the end of 2013, ahead of the court verdict on the retrial petition.

On 4 December 2013, the Tokyo High Court announced it would drop the plea for a posthumous retrial for Sadamichi Hirasawa following his adopted son's death. As a result, the court effectively declared the case closed, unless other members of the Hirasawa family wish to pursue a retrial.

== In popular culture ==
The Teigin incident is the basis for The Aosawa Murders, a 2005 Japanese crime novel written by Riku Onda, which describes a fictional mass poisoning case in Japan in 1973. This novel won the Mystery Writers of Japan Award for best Japanese crime fiction in 2006. A 2009 novel, Occupied City by English author David Peace, who was long a resident in Japan, is based on the Hirasawa case. The case is also referenced in Ian Fleming's 11th James Bond novel, You Only Live Twice (1964), though embellished and exaggerated.

In 1964, Nikkatsu released Teigin jiken: Shikeishû (Teigin Incident: Condemned / The Long Death), a docudrama-style recounting of the case. Directed by Kei Kumai, the film provided actor Kinzō Shin with a starring role as Hirasawa.

== See also ==
- Iwao Hakamada
- Matsuo Fujimoto
- Sakae Menda
- Mitaka incident
- Sayama Incident
