= Curtis Cokes =

American boxer (1937–2020)

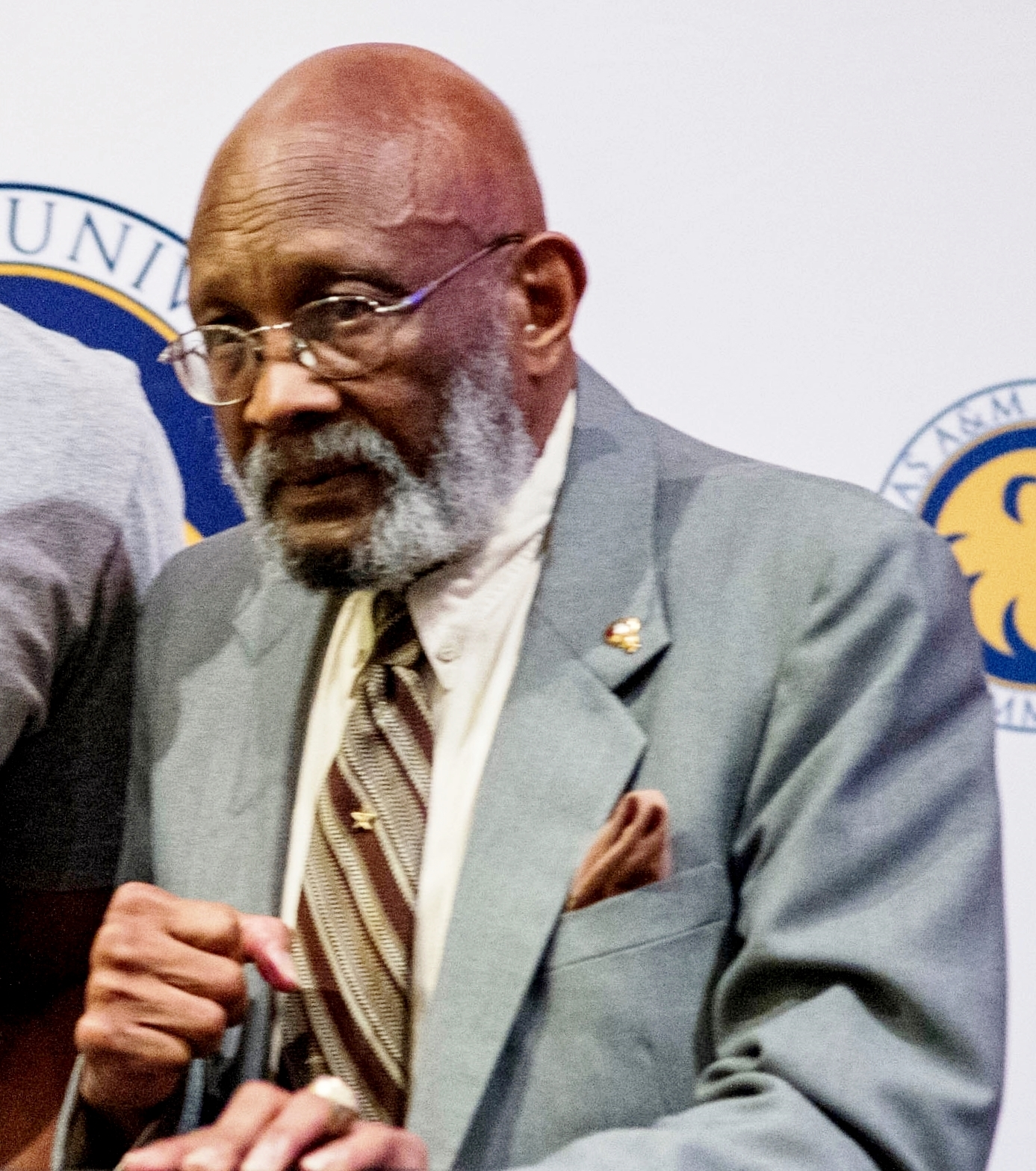
- Cokes at Texas A&M University-Commerce campus, 2014

Personal information
- Born: June 15, 1937 Dallas, Texas, U.S.
- Died: May 29, 2020 (aged 82) Dallas, Texas, U.S.
- Weight: Welterweight

Boxing career
- Stance: Orthodox

Boxing record
- Total fights: 80
- Wins: 62
- Win by KO: 30
- Losses: 14
- Draws: 4
- No contests: 0

Curtis Cokes (June 15, 1937 – May 29, 2020) was an American professional boxer and trainer, who competed in the welterweight division between 1958 and 1972. He was the simultaneous NYSAC, WBA, WBC and The Ring Welterweight Champion between 1966 and 1969.

== Pre-championship career ==
On March 24, 1958, Cokes began to box professionally, defeating Manuel Gonzalez, whom he would later fight for the world title, in a six-round decision. He won eleven fights in a row, including a second match with Gonzalez, before losing to Gonzalez in their third fight, on April 27, 1959. His next fight, against Garland Randall on June 18 of the same year, ended in a three-round no contest. He and Randall had an immediate rematch and on August 27, he knocked out Randall in the first round. He had an additional fourteen fights, going 11-2-1 in that span (his one draw was against Kenny Lane, a boxer who twice challenged Carlos Ortiz for world championships), before facing Luis Rodriguez, another world welterweight champion, on September 3, 1961. He beat Rodriguez by a ten-round decision, outpointed Gonzalez in their fourth fight, and lost to Rodriguez in their second fight, also by points. He went 13–4 in his next seventeen fights, and, after losing in a ten-round decision to Eddie Pace at Los Angeles, California, on August 27, 1964, he announced his retirement. However, on October 14 of that year, he announced he was returning to boxing.

== Championship ==
After winning three fights in a row, he and Gonzalez were matched for a fifth time on August 24, 1966, this time for the WBA/WBC vacant world welterweight title, in New Orleans. Cokes outpointed Manuel Gonzalez to become world welterweight champion. On November 28, 1966, he retained the crown against Jean Josselin of France in a fifteen-round decision. Nat Fleischer was one of the judges for that fight.

On May 19, 1967, he retained the title with a tenth-round knockout of Francois Villeiman, and on October 2, he met Charlie Shipes, who was recognized as champion in California. He knocked Shipes out in eight rounds in Oakland.

On April 18, 1968, he retained his title with a fifth-round knockout of Willie Ludick, and on October 21, with a fifteen-round decision over Ramon La Cruz.

== Post-championship career ==
Cokes lost the world welterweight title on April 18, 1969, when he was knocked out by Cuban José Nápoles in thirteen rounds in Los Angeles. On June 29, the pair had a rematch in Nápoles' adopted hometown of Mexico City, Mexico, and Nápoles repeated his victory, this time by a tenth-round knockout.

Cokes had eleven more fights before retiring, winning seven, losing three and drawing in one. His last three fights were in South Africa. He retired after a ten-round decision win against Ezra Mnzinyane on October 5, 1972.

Cokes had a record of 62 wins, 14 losses and four draws, with 30 wins by knockout.

== After boxing ==
After retiring, Cokes became a trainer. He worked with fighters such as Quincy Taylor and Ike Ibeabuchi.

Cokes also made one film appearance in the year of his retirement. He appeared in the 1972 John Huston film Fat City alongside future Academy Award winner Jeff Bridges and Stacy Keach.

In 2003, Cokes was inducted into the International Boxing Hall of Fame.

== Death ==
Cokes died at age 82 of heart failure on May 29, 2020.

== Professional boxing record ==
80 fights	62 wins	14 losses
By knockout	30	3
By decision	32	11
Draws	4	

No.	Result	Record	Opponent	Type	Round	Date	Location	Notes
80	Win	62–14–4	Ezra Mzinyane	PTS	10	Oct 5, 1972	Langa Stadium, Cape Town	
79	Win	61–14–4	Joseph Hali	PTS	10	Sep 23, 1972	Centenary Hall, New Brighton, Port Elizabeth	
78	Loss	60–14–4	Elijah Makhathini	PTS	10	Sep 9, 1972	Curries Fountain, Durban	
77	Loss	60–13–4	Carlos Alberto Salinas	SD	10	Dec 2, 1971	Memorial Auditorium, Sacramento	
76	Loss	60–12–4	Rafael Gutierrez	SD	10	May 24, 1972	Civic Auditorium, San Francisco	
75	Draw	60–11–4	Fate Davis	PTS	10	Mar 17, 1971	Armory, Akron	
74	Win	60–11–3	Billy Braggs	TKO	6 (10)	Nov 3, 1970	Eagles Club, Milwaukee	
73	Win	59–11–3	Harold Richardson	UD	10	Sep 29, 1970	Memorial Auditorium, Dallas	
72	Win	58–11–3	Fate Davis	UD	10	Sep 11, 1970	Will Rogers Coliseum, Fort Worth	
71	Win	57–11–3	Danny Perez	TKO	7 (10)	Aug 10, 1970	Memorial Auditorium, Dallas	
70	Win	56–11–3	Roberto Pena	KO	5 (10)	Jan 27, 1970	Convention Center, Fort Worth	
69	Loss	55–11–3	José Nápoles	RTD	10 (15)	Jun 29, 1969	Monumental Plaza de Toros México, Mexico City	For WBA, WBC, NYSAC, and The Ring welterweight titles
68	Loss	55–10–3	José Nápoles	RTD	13 (15)	Apr 18, 1969	Forum, Inglewood	Lost WBA, WBC, NYSAC, and The Ring welterweight titles
67	Win	55–9–3	Don Cobbs	KO	1 (10)	Feb 10, 1969	Arena Exposition Hall, Saint Louis	
66	Win	54–9–3	Ramon La Cruz	UD	15	Oct 21, 1968	Municipal Auditorium, New Orleans	Retained WBA, WBC, NYSAC, and The Ring welterweight titles
65	Win	53–9–3	Joseph Sishi	KO	5 (10)	Jul 5, 1968	New Kingsmead Soccer Stadium, Durban	
64	Win	52–9–3	Willie Ludick	TKO	3 (10)	Jun 29, 1968	Praça de Touros Monumental de Lourenço Marques, Maputo	
63	Win	51–9–3	Joe N'Gidi	RTD	4 (10)	Jun 15, 1968	Wembley Stadium, Johannesburg	
62	Win	50–9–3	Willie Ludick	TKO	5 (15)	Apr 16, 1968	Memorial Auditorium, Dallas	Retained WBA, WBC, NYSAC, and The Ring welterweight titles
61	Win	49–9–3	Jimmy Lester	UD	10	Mar 15, 1968	Auditorium, Oakland	
60	Win	48–9–3	Jean Josselin	UD	10	Feb 5, 1968	Palais des Sports, Paris	
59	Win	47–9–3	Charley Shipes	TKO	8 (15)	Oct 2, 1967	Oakland Arena, Oakland	Retained WBA, WBC, NYSAC, and The Ring welterweight titles
58	Win	46–9–3	Francois Pavilla	TKO	10 (15)	May 19, 1967	Memorial Auditorium, Dallas	Retained WBA, WBC, NYSAC, and The Ring welterweight titles
57	Loss	45–9–3	Gypsy Joe Harris	UD	10	Mar 31, 1967	Madison Square Garden, New York	
56	Win	45–8–3	Mike Cruz	KO	3 (10)	Feb 20, 1967	Memorial Auditorium, Dallas	
55	Draw	44–8–3	Francois Pavilla	PTS	10	Jan 23, 1967	Palais des Sports, Paris	
54	Win	44–8–2	Jean Josselin	UD	15	Nov 28, 1966	Memorial Auditorium, Dallas	Retained WBA, WBC and NYSAC welterweight titles; Won vacant The Ring welterweight title
53	Win	43–8–2	Enrique Cruz	KO	7 (10)	Sep 27, 1966	Memorial Coliseum, Corpus Christi	
52	Win	42–8–2	Manuel Gonzalez	UD	15	Aug 24, 1966	Municipal Auditorium, New Orleans	Won vacant WBA, WBC and NYSAC welterweight titles
51	Win	41–8–2	Luis Manuel Rodriguez	TKO	15 (15)	Jul 6, 1966	Municipal Auditorium, New Orleans	
50	Win	40–8–2	Billy Collins	UD	12	Dec 13, 1965	Municipal Auditorium, New Orleans	
49	Win	39–8–2	Fortunato Manca	PTS	10	Apr 23, 1965	Palazzetto dello Sport, Roma	
48	Win	38–8–2	Marshall Wells	TKO	12 (12)	Mar 15, 1965	Sportatorium, Dallas	
47	Loss	37–8–2	Eddie Pace	PTS	10	Aug 27, 1964	Olympic Auditorium, Los Angeles	
46	Win	37–7–2	Al Andrews	PTS	10	Aug 10, 1964	Kearney Bowl, Fresno	
45	Win	36–7–2	Al Andrews	UD	10	Jun 9, 1964	Castaways Hotel, Las Vegas	
44	Win	35–7–2	Tony Montano	UD	10	May 12, 1964	Civic Auditorium, Albuquerque	
43	Loss	34–7–2	Stanley Hayward	TKO	4 (10)	May 1, 1964	Blue Horizon, Philadelphia	
42	Win	34–6–2	Flory Olguin	TKO	5 (12)	May 30, 1963	Civic Auditorium, Albuquerque	
41	Win	33–6–2	Stan Harrington	UD	10	May 21, 1963	Civic Auditorium, Honolulu	
40	Loss	32–6–2	Jose Stable	UD	10	Apr 20, 1963	Sunnyside Garden, Sunnyside, Queens	
39	Win	32–5–2	Joey Parks	KO	5 (10)	Feb 25, 1963	Wichita Falls	
38	Win	31–5–2	Johnny Newman	KO	2 (10)	Feb 11, 1963	Moulin Rouge, Hollywood	
37	Win	30–5–2	Gregorio Ceniceros	KO	2 (10)	Dec 10, 1962	Dallas	
36	Win	29–5–2	Hubert Jackson	KO	1 (10)	Nov 11, 1962	Sportatorium, Dallas	
35	Loss	28–5–2	Manuel Alvarez	UD	10	Sep 8, 1962	Monterrey	
34	Win	28–4–2	Joey Limas	UD	10	Aug 22, 1962	Civic Auditorium, Albuquerque	
33	Win	27–4–2	Rudolph Bent	KO	8 (10)	May 11, 1962	Sportatorium, Dallas	
32	Win	26–4–2	Hilario Morales	TKO	5 (10)	Apr 6, 1962	Sportatorium, Dallas	
31	Win	25–4–2	Kid Rayo	SD	10	Feb 13, 1962	Municipal Auditorium, San Antonio	
30	Win	24–4–2	Carlos Macias	TKO	4 (10)	Jan 23, 1962	Sam Houston Coliseum, Houston	
29	Loss	23–4–2	Luis Manuel Rodríguez	UD	10	Dec 2, 1961	Convention Center, Miami Beach	
28	Win	23–3–2	Manuel Gonzalez	UD	10	Sep 14, 1961	Sportatorium, Dallas	
27	Win	22–3–2	Luis Manuel Rodríguez	SD	10	Aug 3, 1961	Memorial Auditorium, Dallas	
26	Draw	21–3–2	Kenny Lane	PTS	10	Jun 8, 1961	Texas Livestock Coliseum, Dallas	
25	Loss	21–3–1	Hilario Morales	UD	10	Apr 4, 1961	Auditorio Municipal, Ciudad Juarez	
24	Win	21–2–1	Charley Tombstone Smith	UD	10	Feb 13, 1961	Sportatorium, Dallas	
23	Win	20–2–1	Joe Miceli	UD	10	Jan 16, 1961	Sportatorium, Dallas	
22	Win	19–2–1	Stefan Redl	TKO	8 (10)	Oct 24, 1960	Memorial Auditorium, Dallas	
21	Win	18–2–1	Joe Louis Hargrove	TKO	2 (10)	Sep 13, 1960	Memorial Auditorium, Dallas	
20	Win	17–2–1	Pete Ruiz	TKO	3 (8)	Jul 29, 1960	Dudley Field, El Paso	
19	Win	16–2–1	Lovell Jenkins	PTS	8	Mar 1, 1960	Sports Arena, Amarillo	
18	Win	15–2–1	Aman Peck	TKO	5 (8)	Dec 14, 1959	Memorial Auditorium, Dallas	
17	Loss	14–2–1	Frankie Davis	SD	6	Dec 2, 1959	Sam Houston Coliseum, Houston	
16	Win	14–1–1	Mel Ferguson	UD	8	Sep 14, 1959	Sportatorium, Dallas	
15	Win	13–1–1	Reggie Williams	KO	5 (6)	Aug 27, 1959	Memorial Stadium, Baton Rouge	
14	Win	12–1–1	Rip Randall	KO	1 (6)	Jul 27, 1959	Memorial Auditorium, Dallas	
13	Draw	11–1–1	Rip Randall	TD	2 (6)	May 18, 1959	Memorial Auditorium, Dallas	
12	Loss	11–1	Manuel Gonzalez	SD	10	Apr 27, 1959	Sportatorium, Dallas	
11	Win	11–0	Henry Watson	PTS	4	Apr 1, 1959	Memorial Auditorium, Dallas	
10	Win	10–0	Babe McCarron	TKO	3 (8)	Jan 20, 1959	Fair Park Coliseum, Lubbock	
9	Win	9–0	Ruben Flores	PTS	6	Dec 1, 1958	Memorial Auditorium, Dallas	
8	Win	8–0	Manuel Gonzalez	SD	8	Nov 22, 1958	Fair Park Coliseum, Lubbock	
7	Win	7–0	Elmo Tex Henderson	UD	6	Oct 27, 1958	Memorial Auditorium, Dallas	
6	Win	6–0	Sammy Williams	TKO	6 (6)	Jun 30, 1958	Memorial Auditorium, Dallas	
5	Win	5–0	Cecil Courtney	UD	6	May 26, 1958	Sportatorium, Dallas	
4	Win	4–0	Babe Vance	UD	6	May 12, 1958	Sportatorium, Dallas	
3	Win	3–0	Jimmy Leach	UD	6	Apr 28, 1958	Sportatorium, Dallas	
2	Win	2–0	Gil Tapia	PTS	4	Apr 7, 1958	Sportatorium, Dallas	
1	Win	1–0	Manuel Gonzalez	PTS	6	Mar 24, 1958	Midland High School Gym, Midland	

== Titles in boxing ==
=== Major world titles ===
- NYSAC welterweight champion (147 lbs)
- WBA welterweight champion (147 lbs)
- WBC welterweight champion (147 lbs)

=== The Ring magazine titles ===
- The Ring welterweight champion (147 lbs)

=== Undisputed titles ===
- Undisputed welterweight champion

== See also ==
- List of world welterweight boxing champions

Sporting positions
World boxing titles
Vacant Title last held by Emile Griffith	WBA welterweight champion August 24, 1966 – April 18, 1969	Succeeded by José Nápoles
Vacant Title last held by Emile Griffith	WBC welterweight champion August 24, 1966 – April 18, 1969	Succeeded by José Nápoles
Vacant Title last held by Emile Griffith	The Ring welterweight champion November 28, 1966 – April 18, 1969	Succeeded by José Nápoles
Vacant Title last held by Emile Griffith	Undisputed welterweight champion August 24, 1966 – April 18, 1969	Succeeded by José Nápoles
