= Praça de Touros Monumental de Lourenço Marques =

Bullring in Maputo, Mozambique

Coordinates: 25.95099°S 32.57913°E

The Monumental Bullring of Lourenço Marques also known as the Maputo Bullring, in Maputo is one of 8 bullrings in Africa, along with Tangier, Luanda, Melilla, Uchda, Villa Sanjurjo and Oran.

Ricardo Chibanga, the first black African bullfighter, saw fights here as a child.

In 1968 a boxing match was held between Willie Ludick and Curtis Cokes.

In 1969, the Governor-General of Mozambique Baltasar Rebelo de Sousa went to see a bullfight in the bullring.
