= Carmelo Bossi =

Italian boxer

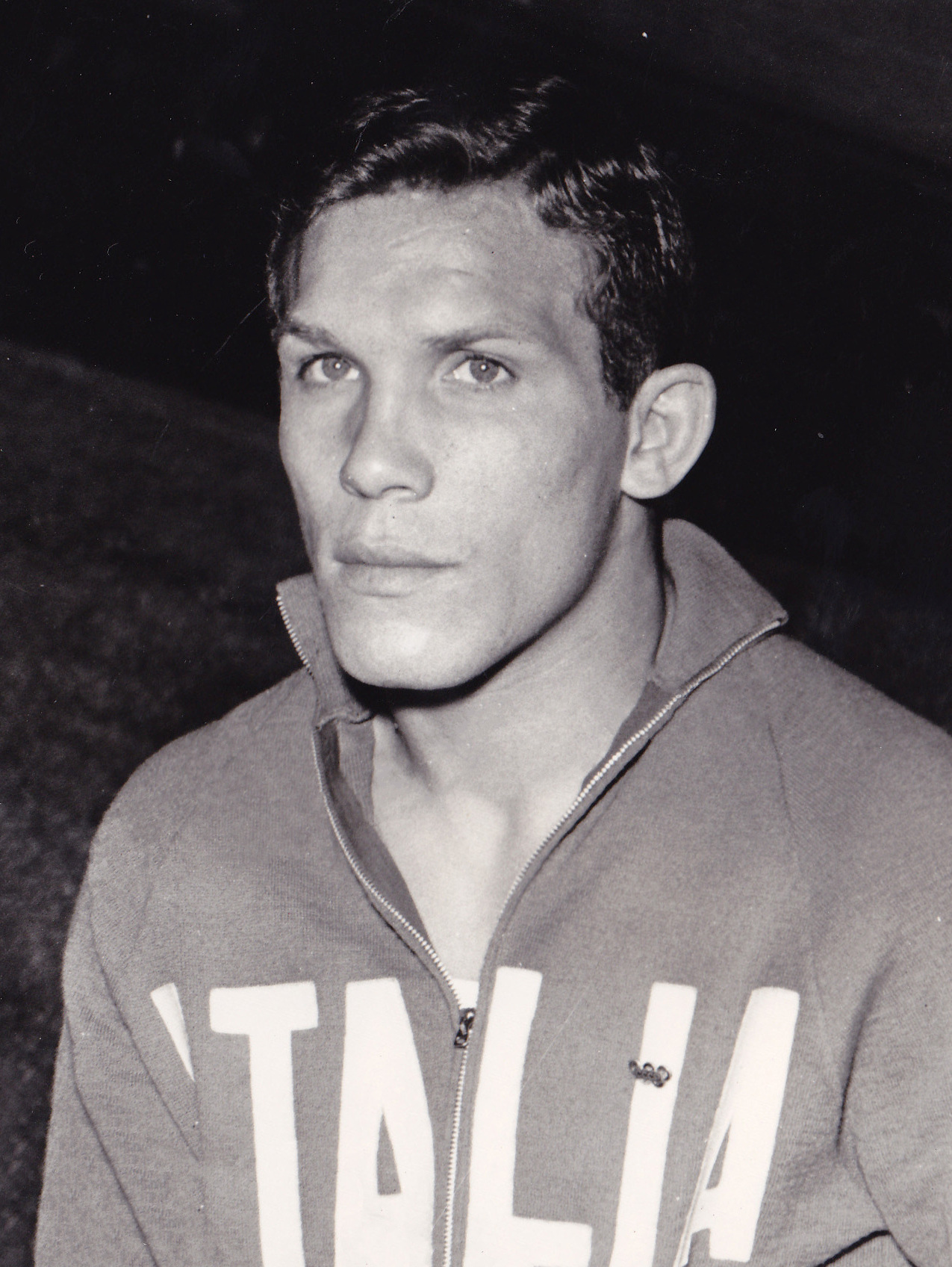
- Bossi at the 1960 Olympics

Personal information
- Nationality: Italian
- Born: Carmelo Bossi; 15 October 1939 Milan, Italy
- Died: 23 March 2014 (aged 74) Milan, Italy
- Height: 5 ft 7 in (170 cm)
- Weight: Welterweight; Light middleweight

Boxing career
- Stance: Orthodox

Boxing record
- Total fights: 51
- Wins: 40
- Win by KO: 10
- Losses: 8
- Draws: 3
Medal record
Representing Italy
Olympics
Silver medal – second place	1960 Rome	Light middleweight
European Amateur Championships
Silver medal – second place	1959 Lucerne	Welterweight

Carmelo Bossi (15 October 1939 – 23 March 2014) was an Italian boxer who was the undisputed super welterweight champion of the world. Bossi boxed from 1961 to 1971 and his overall record was 40 wins (10 KOs), 8 defeats and 3 draws.

== Career ==
Bossi won a silver medal at the 1960 Olympics. In early 1961 he turned professional and fought through 1971. In 1965 Bossi won the national and in 1967 the European welterweight title. After defending the European title twice he lost it on 14 August 1968 to Fighting Mack. In 1967 he twice fought Willie Ludick for the world welterweight title (South African Version), but lost on both occasions. In July 1970 he took the Lineal, WBC and WBA super welterweight titles by defeating Freddie Little, but lost them to Koichi Wajima in October 1971 in his last bout.

== Professional boxing record ==
51 fights	40 wins	8 losses
By knockout	10	2
By decision	29	6
By disqualification	1	0
Draws	3	

No.	Result	Record	Opponent	Type	Round, time	Date	Location	Notes
51	Loss	40–8–3	Koichi Wajima	SD	15	Oct 31, 1971	Nihon University Auditorium, Japan	Lost WBA and WBC junior-middleweight titles
50	Draw	40–7–3	José Hernandez	MD	15	Apr 29, 1971	Palacio de los Deportes, Madrid, Spain	Retained WBA and WBC junior-middleweight titles
49	Loss	40–7–2	Pierre Fourie	PTS	10	Nov 14, 1970	Ellis Park Tennis Stadium, Johannesburg, South Africa	
48	Win	40–6–2	Aldo Battistutta	TKO	5 (10)	Oct 14, 1970	Udine, Italy	
47	Win	39–6–2	Freddie Little	UD	15	Jul 9, 1970	Stadio Sada, Monza, Italy	Won WBA and WBC junior-middleweight titles
46	Loss	38–6–2	Johann Orsolics	PTS	15	Apr 9, 1970	Stadthalle, Vienna, Austria	For European welterweight title
45	Win	38–5–2	Guy Vercoutter	PTS	10	Mar 6, 1970	PalaLido, Milan, Italy	
44	Loss	37–5–2	Freddie Little	TD	3 (10), 2:10	Oct 31, 1969	PalaEur, Roma, Italy	
43	Win	37–4–2	John Tiger	PTS	8	Jul 11, 1969	Milan, Italy	
42	Win	36–4–2	Fighting Mack	PTS	10	Jun 20, 1969	Velodromo Vigorelli, Milan, Italy	
41	Win	35–4–2	Ferdinand Ahumibe	PTS	8	May 9, 1969	PalaLido, Milan, Italy	
40	Win	34–4–2	Klaus Klein	PTS	8	Apr 3, 1969	PalaLido, Milan, Italy	
39	Loss	33–4–2	Fighting Mack	KO	10 (15)	Aug 14, 1968	Lignano Sabbiadoro, Italy	Lost European welterweight title
38	Win	33–3–2	Abderamane Faradji	PTS	8	May 26, 1968	Stadio San Siro, Milan, Italy	
37	Win	32–3–2	Jean Josselin	PTS	15	May 3, 1968	PalaEur, Roma, Italy	Retained European welterweight title
36	Win	31–3–2	Lennox Beckles	PTS	10	Jan 27, 1968	Palazzo dello Sport (Pad. 3 Fiera), Milan, Italy	
35	Loss	30–3–2	Willie Ludick	PTS	15	Nov 25, 1967	Ellis Park Rugby Stadium, Johannesburg, South Africa	For world welterweight title (South African version)
34	Loss	30–2–2	Willie Ludick	PTS	15	Oct 7, 1967	Ellis Park Tennis Stadium, Johannesburg, South Africa	For world welterweight title (South African version)
33	Win	30–1–2	Johnny Cooke	TKO	12 (15)	Aug 16, 1967	San Remo, Italy	Retained European welterweight title
32	Win	29–1–2	Angel Robinson Garcia	TKO	5 (10)	Jul 14, 1967	PalaEur, Roma, Italy	
31	Win	28–1–2	Jean Josselin	PTS	15	May 17, 1967	Casino Municipale, San Remo, Italy	Won European welterweight title
30	Win	27–1–2	Assane Fakyh	PTS	8	Feb 24, 1967	Palasport, Torino, Italy	
29	Win	26–1–2	Domenico Tiberia	PTS	12	Jan 8, 1967	Aprilia, Italy	Retained Italian welterweight title
28	Draw	25–1–2	Teddy Meho	PTS	8	Nov 24, 1966	Palacio de los Deportes, Barcelona, Spain	
27	Win	25–1–1	Eduardo Batista	TKO	5 (8)	Sep 14, 1966	Teatro Politeama Universale, Arezzo, Italy	
26	Win	24–1–1	James Shelton	PTS	8	Aug 18, 1966	San Remo, Italy	
25	Draw	23–1–1	Angel Robinson Garcia	PTS	10	Apr 21, 1966	Gran Price, Barcelona, Spain	
24	Win	23–1	Mario Landolfi	TKO	8 (10)	Mar 11, 1966	PalaEur, Roma, Italy	
23	Win	22–1	Domenico Tiberia	PTS	12	Oct 5, 1965	Napoli, Italy	Won Italian welterweight title
22	Win	21–1	Alfredo Parmeggiani	PTS	10	Jun 18, 1965	Stadio San Siro, Milan, Italy	
21	Win	20–1	Luciano Piazza	PTS	8	Feb 27, 1965	Palazzo dello Sport (Pad. 3 Fiera), Milan, Italy	
20	Win	19–1	Andrés Navarro	PTS	8	Feb 4, 1965	Palacio de los Deportes, Barcelona, Spain	
19	Win	18–1	Fred Galiana	TKO	10 (10)	Nov 26, 1964	Gran Price, Barcelona, Spain	
18	Win	17–1	Giuliano Nervino	PTS	8	Nov 12, 1964	Milan, Italy	
17	Win	16–1	Vicente Mokhtar	PTS	8	Nov 4, 1964	Ferrara, Italy	
16	Win	15–1	Julio Rocha	PTS	8	Apr 30, 1964	Milan, Italy	
15	Win	14–1	Armstrong Janny	PTS	8	Feb 28, 1964	PalaLido, Milan, Italy	
14	Win	13–1	Vicente Ferrando	PTS	8	Feb 7, 1964	PalaLido, Milan, Italy	
13	Win	12–1	Alberto Alsinet	KO	2 (8)	Dec 26, 1963	PalaLido, Milan, Italy	
12	Win	11–1	Jaconias Amorim	PTS	8	Dec 5, 1963	Milan, Italy	
11	Win	10–1	Mirko Rossi	TKO	6 (8), 2:14	Nov 22, 1963	PalaLido, Milan, Italy	
10	Win	9–1	Vicente Mokhtar	PTS	8	Nov 4, 1963	Ferrara, Italy	
9	Loss	8–1	Johnny Angel	TKO	5 (8)	Sep 13, 1963	Palazzetto dello Sport, Roma, Italy	
8	Win	8–0	Michel Francois	PTS	6	May 24, 1963	Teatro Principe, Milan, Italy	
7	Win	7–0	Bruno Pomaro	TKO	4 (6)	Apr 19, 1963	Pavia, Italy	
6	Win	6–0	Carlo Sala	TKO	5 (6)	Jul 27, 1962	Roma, Italy	
5	Win	5–0	Marcello Verziera	PTS	6	May 4, 1962	Roma, Italy	
4	Win	4–0	Germano Cavalieri	PTS	6	May 21, 1961	Treviso, Italy	
3	Win	3–0	Dante Madella	PTS	6	Mar 31, 1961	Ancona, Italy	
2	Win	2–0	Jean Marchandeau	PTS	6	Mar 18, 1961	PalaLido, Milan, Italy	
1	Win	1–0	Isidoro Princic	DQ	2 (4), 2:45	Mar 4, 1961	Palazzo dello Sport (Pad. 3 Fiera), Milan, Italy	

== Titles in boxing ==
=== Major world titles ===
- WBA light middleweight champion (154 lbs)
- WBC light middleweight champion (154 lbs)

=== Regional/International titles ===
- Italian welterweight champion (147 lbs)
- European welterweight champion (147 lbs)

=== Undisputed titles ===
- Undisputed light middleweight champion

== See also ==
- List of world light-middleweight boxing champions

Sporting positions
Regional boxing titles
Preceded by Jean Josselin	EBU welterweight champion 3 May 1968 – 14 August 1968	Succeeded by Fighting Mack
World boxing titles
Preceded by Freddie Little	WBA super welterweight champion 9 July 1970 – 31 October 1971	Succeeded by Koichi Wajima
Preceded by Freddie Little	WBC super welterweight champion 9 July 1970 – 31 October 1971	Succeeded by Koichi Wajima
Preceded by Freddie Little	Undisputed super welterweight champion 9 July 1970 – 31 October 1971	Succeeded by Koichi Wajima
