= Yuh Jae-doo =

South Korean boxer (born 1948)

Jae-Doo Yuh
Personal information
- Born: Yuh Jae-doo; April 25, 1948 (age 78) Seoul, South Korea
- Height: 5 ft 9 in (175 cm)
- Weight: Light-middleweight; Middleweight

Boxing career
- Stance: Orthodox

Boxing record
- Total fights: 55
- Wins: 50
- Win by KO: 29
- Losses: 3
- Draws: 2

Jae-Doo Yuh (Korean: 유제두; Hanja: 柳済斗; born April 25, 1948) is a former South korean professional boxer who competed from 1968 to 1978. He held the World Boxing Association (WBA) and Ring Magazine light-middleweight titles from 1975 to 1976.

== Pro career ==
In 1971, Yuh won the Orient and Pacific Boxing Federation middleweight title.

In 1975, after his successful 15th defense of the OPBF middleweight title, he moved down in weight to light middleweight and challenged Koichi Wajima for the WBA and The Ring light middleweight titles in Fukuoka, Japan. He eventually became the second South Korean light middleweight world champion by knocking out Wajima in the 7th round. He defended the belt once before losing the belt to Wajima via 15th-round KO in a rematch in 1976. Although he had lost the world light middleweight title, Yuh retained the OPBF middleweight belt until his eventual retirement from the ring in 1978, when he vacated the title. He also holds the OPBF record for most successful title defenses, defending the title 21 times over 7 years.

== Professional boxing record ==
55 fights	50 wins	3 losses
By knockout	29	3
By decision	21	0
Draws	2	

No.	Result	Record	Opponent	Type	Round, time	Date	Location	Notes
55	Win	50–3–2	Heung Won Kang	PTS	12	Dec 17, 1978	Munhwa Gymnasium, Seoul, South Korea	Retained OPBF middleweight titles
54	Loss	49–3–2	Ho Joo	KO	10 (10)	Jul 6, 1978	Seoul, South Korea	
53	Win	49–2–2	Francisco Montemayor	KO	6 (10)	Apr 5, 1978	Seoul, South Korea	
52	Win	48–2–2	Alberto Cruz	PTS	12	Jan 24, 1978	Busan, South Korea	Retained OPBF middleweight titles
51	Win	47–2–2	Toshiaki Suzuki	PTS	12	Oct 9, 1977	Seoul, South Korea	Retained OPBF middleweight titles
50	Win	46–2–2	Jae Keun Lim	KO	7 (10)	Aug 28, 1977	Jangchung Gymnasium, Seoul, South Korea	
49	Win	45–2–2	Saburo Sakai	KO	2 (12), 1:51	Apr 9, 1977	Gwangju City, South Korea	Retained OPBF middleweight titles
48	Win	44–2–2	Dommy Cotacte	KO	5 (10)	Feb 6, 1977	Gwangju City, South Korea	
47	Win	43–2–2	Yuichiro Watanabe	PTS	12	Dec 12, 1976	Daegu, South Korea	Retained OPBF middleweight titles
46	Draw	42–2–2	Alberto Cruz	PTS	12	Sep 26, 1976	Changchung Gymnasium, Seoul, South Korea	Retained OPBF middleweight titles
45	Win	42–2–1	Peter Nanboku	PTS	10	Jun 19, 1976	Seoul, South Korea	
44	Loss	41–2–1	Koichi Wajima	KO	15 (15), 1:47	Feb 17, 1976	Nihon University Auditorium, Japan	Lost WBA and The Ring light-middleweight titles
43	Win	41–1–1	Saburo Sakai	KO	8 (10)	Jan 17, 1976	Busan, South Korea	
42	Win	40–1–1	Masahiro Misako	KO	6 (15), 2:16	Nov 11, 1975	Sunpu Arena, Shizuoka, Japan	Retained WBA and The Ring light-middleweight titles
41	Win	39–1–1	Nobuyoshi Ozaki	TKO	4 (12)	Oct 4, 1975	Busan, South Korea	Retained OPBF middleweight titles
40	Win	38–1–1	Koichi Wajima	KO	7 (15), 2:04	Jun 7, 1975	City Sogo Gym, Kitakyushu, Japan	Won WBA and The Ring light-middleweight titles
39	Win	37–1–1	Nobuyoshi Ozaki	KO	4 (12)	Mar 30, 1975	Busan, South Korea	Retained OPBF middleweight titles
38	Win	36–1–1	Isamu Kondo	KO	2 (10)	Dec 14, 1974	Seoul, South Korea	
37	Win	35–1–1	Yuji Miyagoshi	PTS	12	Nov 17, 1974	Busan, South Korea	Retained OPBF middleweight titles
36	Win	34–1–1	Nobuyoshi Ozaki	KO	8 (12)	Jul 28, 1974	Busan, South Korea	Retained OPBF middleweight titles
35	Win	33–1–1	Hitoshi Nakagawa	KO	6 (12), 1:07	Jun 23, 1974	Busan, South Korea	Retained OPBF middleweight titles
34	Win	32–1–1	Narong Phisanurachan	PTS	12	Mar 31, 1974	Busan, South Korea	Retained OPBF middleweight titles
33	Win	31–1–1	Han Shik Kim	KO	10 (10)	Aug 15, 1973	Daegu, South Korea	
32	Win	30–1–1	Cassius Naito	PTS	12	Jul 14, 1973	Busan, South Korea	Retained OPBF middleweight titles
31	Win	29–1–1	Ken Okita	KO	3 (10)	Jun 16, 1973	Busan, South Korea	
30	Win	28–1–1	Ken Okita	PTS	12	May 12, 1973	Daegu, South Korea	Retained OPBF middleweight titles
29	Win	27–1–1	Cassius Naito	KO	5 (12), 2:48	Apr 10, 1973	Seoul, South Korea	Retained OPBF middleweight titles
28	Win	26–1–1	Michihiro Horihata	KO	9 (10)	Mar 4, 1973	Busan, South Korea	
27	Win	25–1–1	Sakae 'Big' Maruyama	KO	2 (10)	Jan 21, 1973	Kudok Gymnasium, Busan, South Korea	
26	Win	24–1–1	Cassius Naito	PTS	12	Nov 12, 1972	Daegu, South Korea	Retained OPBF middleweight titles
25	Win	23–1–1	Keun Taek Lee	KO	3 (12), 2:18	Oct 1, 1972	Seoul, South Korea	Retained OPBF middleweight titles
24	Win	22–1–1	Hiromichi Hiraide	TKO	8 (12), 1:58	Sep 9, 1972	Daegu, South Korea	Retained OPBF middleweight titles
23	Win	21–1–1	Turtle Okabe	PTS	12	Jun 25, 1972	Busan, South Korea	Retained OPBF middleweight titles
22	Win	20–1–1	Hideo Kanazawa	PTS	12	May 7, 1972	Busan, South Korea	
21	Draw	19–1–1	Hideo Kanazawa	PTS	12	Mar 11, 1972	Seoul, South Korea	
20	Win	19–1	Saburo Sakai	KO	11 (12), 1:54	Jan 29, 1972	Kooduk Gymnasium, Busan, South Korea	Retained OPBF middleweight titles
19	Win	18–1	Masakazu Taninobu	TKO	3 (12), 1:23	Dec 22, 1971	Seoul, South Korea	Retained OPBF middleweight titles
18	Win	17–1	Turtle Okabe	PTS	10	Dec 4, 1971	Seoul, South Korea	
17	Win	16–1	Stephen Smith	TKO	6 (10)	Nov 17, 1971	Seoul, South Korea	
16	Win	15–1	Keun Taek Lee	PTS	12	Sep 28, 1971	Seoul, South Korea	Retained OPBF middleweight titles
15	Win	14–1	Cassius Naito	KO	6 (12), 2:05	Jul 24, 1971	Seoul, South Korea	Won Oriental and PBF middleweight titles
14	Win	13–1	Jo Park	KO	5 (10), 0:38	May 22, 1971	Seoul, South Korea	Retained South Korea middleweight title
13	Win	12–1	Ansano Lee	KO	1 (10), 1:38	Apr 3, 1971	Seoul, South Korea	Won South Korea middleweight title
12	Win	11–1	Hiromichi Hiraide	KO	10 (10)	Feb 20, 1971	Seoul, South Korea	
11	Win	10–1	Tetsuo Hoshino	KO	3 (10)	Dec 19, 1970	Seoul, South Korea	
10	Win	9–1	Ni No Lee	PTS	10	Sep 27, 1970	Seoul, South Korea	
9	Win	8–1	Jae Chun Kim	KO	6 (10)	Nov 29, 1969	Seoul, South Korea	
8	Win	7–1	Armando Boniquit	PTS	10	Sep 9, 1969	Gwangju City, South Korea	
7	Loss	6–1	Byung Mo Lim	TKO	7 (10)	Aug 9, 1969	Seoul, South Korea	
6	Win	6–0	Sung Ki Choi	PTS	8	Jul 13, 1969	Incheon, South Korea	
5	Win	5–0	Tae Gu Kim	PTS	8	May 16, 1969	Gwangju City, South Korea	
4	Win	4–0	Jin Soo Lee	PTS	6	Apr 27, 1969	Seoul, South Korea	
3	Win	3–0	Kwan Soo Lee	PTS	4	Nov 30, 1968	Seoul, South Korea	
2	Win	2–0	Byong Ki Kim	PTS	4	Oct 27, 1968	Seoul, South Korea	
1	Win	1–0	Ho Dong Choi	KO	3 (4)	Oct 3, 1968	Seoul, South Korea	

== See also ==
- List of light middleweight boxing champions
- List of WBA world champions

Sporting positions
World boxing titles
Preceded by Koichi Wajima	WBA light-middleweight champion June 7, 1975 – February 17, 1976	Succeeded by Koichi Wajima
Preceded by Koichi Wajima	The Ring light-middleweight champion June 7, 1975 – February 17, 1976	Succeeded by Koichi Wajima
