= Freddie Little =

American boxer

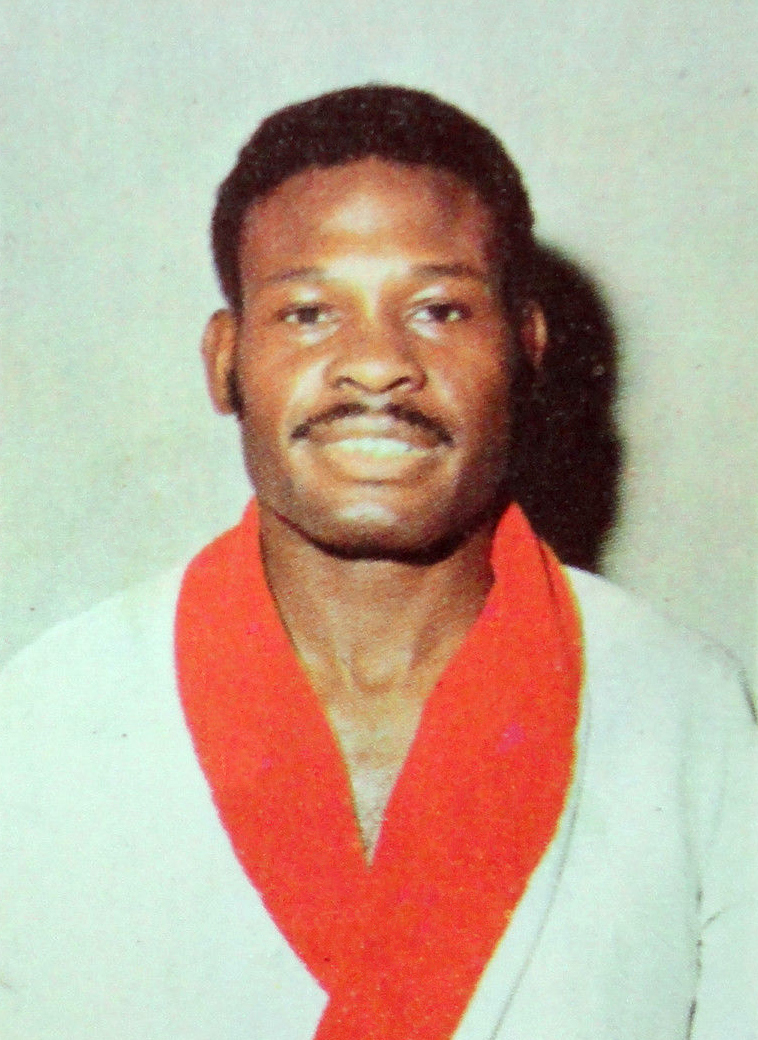
- Freddie Little c. 1970

Personal information
- Born: April 25, 1936 (age 90) Picayune, Mississippi, U.S.
- Height: 5 ft 7 in (170 cm)
- Weight: Light middleweight

Boxing career

Boxing record
- Total fights: 58
- Wins: 51
- Win by KO: 31
- Losses: 6
- No contests: 1

Freddie Little (born April 25, 1936) is an American former professional boxer who held the undisputed junior middleweight championship.

== Professional career ==
Little turned professional in 1957 and challenged the World light middleweight title against Ki-Soo Kim, but lost by split decision in 1967. In 1968 he challenged for the title against Sandro Mazzinghi. The bout stopped with Mazzinghi bleeding from cuts over both eyes. The ringside officials ruled a "no-contest", though under normal circumstances Little would have won by technical knockout.

In 1969 Little captured the vacant World light middleweight title winning by decision against Stanley Hayward. He defended the belt twice before losing it to Carmelo Bossi in 1970 by decision. He retired in 1972.

== Professional boxing record ==
58 fights	51 wins	6 losses
By knockout	31	1
By decision	20	4
By disqualification	0	1
No contests	1	

No.	Result	Record	Opponent	Type	Round	Date	Age	Location	Notes
58	Win	51–6 (1)	Billy Walker	RTD	6 (10)	Jul 6, 1972	36 years, 72 days	Tahoe-Carson Speedway, Carson City, Nevada, U.S.	
57	Win	50–6 (1)	Vicente Medina	PTS	10	Apr 20, 1972	35 years, 361 days	Sahara Tahoe Hotel, Stateline, Nevada, U.S.	
56	Win	49–6 (1)	Clarence Geigger	UD	10	Apr 13, 1972	34 years, 353 days	Sahara Tahoe Hotel, Stateline, Nevada, U.S.	
55	Win	48–6 (1)	Maurice Rice	KO	5 (10)	Dec 23, 1971	35 years, 242 days	Sahara Tahoe, High Sierra Theatre, Stateline, Nevada, U.S.	
54	Win	47–6 (1)	Clarence Geigger	PTS	10	Nov 25, 1970	34 years, 214 days	Silver Slipper, Las Vegas, Nevada, U.S.	
53	Loss	46–6 (1)	Carmelo Bossi	UD	15	Jul 9, 1970	34 years, 75 days	Stadio Sada, Monza, Lombardia, Italy	Lost WBA and WBC junior-middleweight titles
52	Win	46–5 (1)	Gerhard Piaskowy	PTS	15	Mar 20, 1970	33 years, 329 days	Sportpalast, Schoeneberg, Berlin, Germany	Retained WBA and WBC junior-middleweight titles
51	Loss	45–5 (1)	Eddie Pace	DQ	8 (10)	Jan 23, 1970	33 years, 273 days	Palazzetto dello Sport, Roma, Lazio, Italy	Little was disqualified for "not fighting"
50	Win	45–4 (1)	Carmelo Bossi	TD	3 (10)	Oct 31, 1969	33 years, 189 days	Palazzetto dello Sport, Roma, Lazio, Italy	
49	Win	44–4 (1)	Hisao Minami	KO	2 (15)	Sep 9, 1969	33 years, 137 days	Prefectural Gymnasium, Osaka, Osaka, Japan	Retained WBA and WBC junior-middleweight titles
48	Win	43–4 (1)	Joe N'Gidi	TKO	7 (10)	Aug 9, 1969	33 years, 106 days	Orlando Stadium, Johannesburg, Gauteng, South Africa	
47	Win	42–4 (1)	Ezra Mzinyane	PTS	10	Jul 26, 1969	33 years, 92 days	Orlando Stadium, Johannesburg, Gauteng, South Africa	
46	Win	41–4 (1)	Stanley Hayward	UD	15	Mar 17, 1969	32 years, 326 days	Convention Center, Las Vegas, Nevada, U.S.	Won vacant WBA and WBC junior-middleweight titles
45	Win	40–4 (1)	Sugar Boy Nando	KO	4 (10)	Nov 29, 1968	32 years, 218 days	Palazzetto dello Sport, Roma, Lazio, Italy	
44	NC	39–4 (1)	Sandro Mazzinghi	NC	8 (15)	Oct 25, 1968	32 years, 183 days	Palazzetto dello Sport, Roma, Lazio, Italy	WBA and WBC junior-middleweight titles at stake; Little originally declared as the winner via knockout before referee Tomser declared the bout a no-contest
43	Win	39–4	Willard Wynn	KO	3 (10)	Jun 19, 1968	32 years, 55 days	Auditorium, Oakland, California, U.S.	
42	Win	38–4	Mel Collins	UD	10	Jan 17, 1968	31 years, 267 days	Silver Slipper, Las Vegas, Nevada, U.S.	
41	Loss	37–4	Kim Ki-soo	SD	15	Oct 3, 1967	31 years, 161 days	Dongdaemun Baseball Stadium, Seoul, South Korea	For WBA and WBC junior-middleweight titles
40	Win	37–3	Harold Richardson	UD	10	Jul 17, 1967	31 years, 83 days	Municipal Auditorium, New Orleans, Louisiana, U.S.	
39	Win	36–3	Charlie James	UD	10	Apr 10, 1967	30 years, 350 days	Fremont Hotel, Las Vegas, Nevada, U.S.	
38	Win	35–3	Fred McWilliams	UD	10	Mar 16, 1967	30 years, 325 days	Fremont Hotel, Las Vegas, Nevada, U.S.	
37	Win	34–3	Willard Wynn	TKO	8 (10)	Feb 16, 1967	30 years, 297 days	Fremont Hotel, Las Vegas, Nevada, U.S.	
36	Win	33–3	Johnny Gumbs	UD	10	Sep 26, 1966	30 years, 154 days	Silver Slipper, Las Vegas, Nevada, U.S.	
35	Win	32–3	Eddie Pace	MD	10	Jun 13, 1966	30 years, 49 days	Convention Center, Las Vegas, Nevada, U.S.	
34	Win	31–3	Ernest Burford	TKO	8 (10)	Apr 11, 1966	29 years, 351 days	Hacienda Hotel, Las Vegas, Nevada, U.S.	
33	Loss	30–3	Eddie Pace	SD	12	Jan 31, 1966	29 years, 281 days	Convention Center, Las Vegas, Nevada, U.S.	
32	Win	30–2	Denny Moyer	KO	4 (10)	Jan 3, 1966	29 years, 253 days	Hacienda Hotel, Las Vegas, Nevada, U.S.	
31	Win	29–2	Charley Austin	KO	7 (10)	Oct 18, 1965	29 years, 176 days	Hacienda Hotel, Las Vegas, Nevada, U.S.	
30	Win	28–2	Sonny Gill	KO	2 (10)	Sep 13, 1965	29 years, 141 days	Hacienda Hotel, Las Vegas, Nevada, U.S.	
29	Win	27–2	Milo Calhoun	UD	10	Aug 16, 1965	29 years, 113 days	Hacienda Hotel, Las Vegas, Nevada, U.S.	
28	Win	26–2	John Henry Smith	KO	3 (10)	Jun 1, 1965	29 years, 37 days	Hacienda Hotel, Las Vegas, Nevada, U.S.	
27	Win	25–2	Tommy Sims	TKO	7 (10)	Aug 16, 1963	27 years, 113 days	National Guard Armory, Bogalusa, Louisiana, U.S.	
26	Win	24–2	Larry Howard	KO	1 (8)	May 5, 1961	25 years, 10 days	Jefferson County Armory, Louisville, Kentucky, U.S.	
25	Win	23–2	Charley Joseph	UD	10	Jan 1, 1961	24 years, 251 days	Municipal Auditorium, New Orleans, Louisiana, U.S.	
24	Loss	22–2	George Benton	MD	10	Oct 18, 1960	24 years, 176 days	Municipal Auditorium, New Orleans, Louisiana, U.S.	
23	Win	22–1	Billy Stanley	KO	2 (12)	Sep 12, 1960	24 years, 140 days	Sydney Stadium, Sydney, New South Wales, Australia	
22	Win	21–1	Clive Stewart	KO	4 (12)	Aug 15, 1960	23 years, 356 days	Sydney Stadium, Sydney, New South Wales, Australia	
21	Win	20–1	Charley Cotton	UD	10	Jun 6, 1960	24 years, 42 days	Municipal Auditorium, New Orleans, Louisiana, U.S.	
20	Win	19–1	Mel Collins	TKO	6 (10)	May 17, 1960	24 years, 22 days	Bogalusa, Louisiana, U.S.	
19	Win	18–1	Gene Hamilton	TKO	4 (?)	Apr 5, 1960	23 years, 346 days	Lions Club, Bogalusa, Louisiana, U.S.	
18	Win	17–1	Ernest Burford	UD	10	Sep 14, 1959	23 years, 142 days	Bogalusa, Louisiana, U.S.	Won Southern middleweight crown
17	Win	16–1	Billy Tisdale	UD	10	Jun 29, 1959	23 years, 65 days	Coliseum Arena, New Orleans, Louisiana, U.S.	
16	Win	15–1	Norris Burse	TKO	7 (10)	May 12, 1959	23 years, 17 days	Houston, Texas, U.S.	
15	Win	14–1	George Price	KO	2 (8)	Jan 13, 1959	22 years, 263 days	Houston, Texas, U.S.	
14	Win	13–1	Harold Redman	KO	2 (?)	Oct 10, 1958	22 years, 168 days	Franklinton, Louisiana, U.S.	
13	Win	12–1	Joe Gleason	RTD	3 (8)	Aug 4, 1958	22 years, 101 days	Coliseum Arena, New Orleans, Louisiana, U.S.	
12	Loss	11–1	Norris Burse	KO	5 (10)	Jul 7, 1958	22 years, 73 days	Coliseum Arena, New Orleans, Louisiana, U.S.	
11	Win	11–0	Ike Stewart	TKO	4 (6)	Jun 30, 1958	22 years, 66 days	Coliseum Arena, New Orleans, Louisiana, U.S.	
10	Win	10–0	Larry Osbey	TKO	1 (6)	May 29, 1958	22 years, 34 days	Sports Arena, Bogalusa, Louisiana, U.S.	
9	Win	9–0	John Victor Penn	TKO	4 (6)	May 20, 1958	22 years, 25 days	Municipal Auditorium, New Orleans, Louisiana, U.S.	
8	Win	8–0	George King	TKO	3 (?)	May 7, 1958	22 years, 12 days	Sam Houston Coliseum, Houston, Texas, U.S.	
7	Win	7–0	George King	KO	1 (6)	Dec 2, 1957	21 years, 221 days	Coliseum Arena, New Orleans, Louisiana, U.S.	
6	Win	6–0	Harold Redman	PTS	8	Aug 31, 1957	21 years, 128 days	Central Memorial HS Stadium, Bogalusa, Louisiana, U.S.	
5	Win	5–0	Pedro Bradley	TKO	5 (6)	Jun 3, 1957	21 years, 39 days	Coliseum Arena, New Orleans, Louisiana, U.S.	
4	Win	4–0	Earl Gray	UD	6	May 20, 1957	21 years, 25 days	Coliseum Arena, New Orleans, Louisiana, U.S.	
3	Win	3–0	James Glover	KO	2 (?)	Apr 25, 1957	21 years, 0 days	Fort Whiting Armory, Mobile, Alabama, U.S.	
2	Win	2–0	Johnny Powell	KO	4 (4)	Apr 22, 1957	20 years, 362 days	Coliseum Arena, New Orleans, Louisiana, U.S.	
1	Win	1–0	Joe Muscato	KO	1 (4)	Apr 5, 1957	20 years, 345 days	Coliseum Arena, New Orleans, Louisiana, U.S.	

== Titles in boxing ==
=== Major world titles ===
- WBA light middleweight champion (154 lbs)
- WBC light middleweight champion (154 lbs)

=== Regional/International titles ===
- Southern middleweight champion (160 lbs)

=== Undisputed titles ===
- Undisputed light middleweight champion

== See also ==
- List of world light-middleweight boxing champions

Sporting positions
World boxing titles
Vacant Title last held by Alessandro Mazzinghi	WBA super welterweight champion March 17, 1969 – July 9, 1970	Succeeded by Carmelo Bossi
Vacant Title last held by Alessandro Mazzinghi	WBC super welterweight champion March 17, 1969 – July 9, 1970	Succeeded by Carmelo Bossi
Vacant Title last held by Alessandro Mazzinghi	Undisputed super welterweight champion March 17, 1969 – July 9, 1970	Succeeded by Carmelo Bossi
