= Koichi Wajima =

Japanese boxer

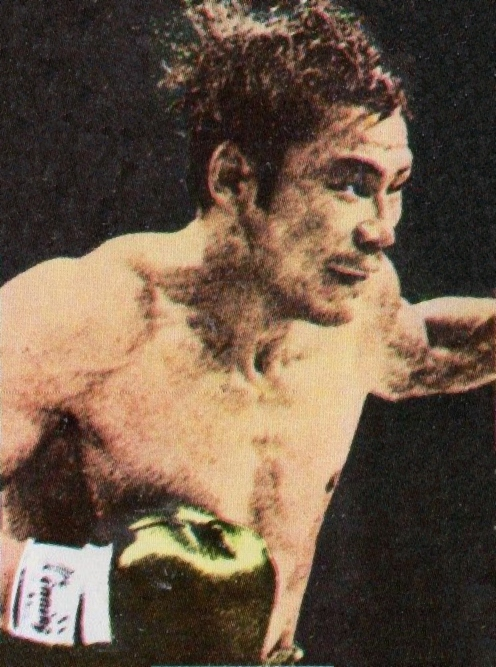
- Wajima c. 1973

Personal information
- Nickname: Hono no Otoko (Man on Fire)
- Born: Koichi Wajima; 21 April 1943 (age 83) Shibetsu, Hokkaidō
- Height: 5 ft 7 1/2 in (171 cm)
- Weight: Light-middleweight

Boxing career
- Stance: Orthodox

Boxing record
- Total fights: 38
- Wins: 31
- Win by KO: 25
- Losses: 6
- Draws: 1

Koichi Wajima (輪島 功一, born 21 April 1943) is a Japanese former professional boxer who was the undisputed light-middleweight champion. He held the WBA and WBC titles from 1971 and 1974, he regained the titles in January 1975 that included The Ring title but lost it right away on June of the same year. He once again won the WBA and The Ring title in 1976.

== Childhood and early career ==
Wajima was born in Karafuto, (current Sakhalin) which became Soviet territory when Wajima was three years old. He and his family moved to Shibetsu, Hokkaidō, but barely managed to make a living, Wajima was put up for adoption. He lived with his stepfamily while his parents worked in Shibetsu.

Wajima began to work as a fisherman with his stepfamily. He was still in middle school, but had to work from sunset all the way to daybreak. The only time he had to sleep was during class. He was a fighter from a young age, having to work tirelessly each day, and often picking fights with other kids.

After graduating from middle school, he traveled to Tokyo, where he worked briefly as a truck driver before joining the Misako Boxing Gym. He made his professional debut in March, 1968, at the age of 25.

== Professional career ==
Wajima captured the Japanese light-middleweight title in September, 1969. He defended the title 9 times before returning it. He got his first shot at the world title against Carmelo Bossi for the world light middleweight title on October 31, 1971, in Tokyo, winning by 15-round split decision to capture his first world title. He made his first defense in May, 1972, taking less than 2 minutes to knock out his opponent. He would defend the title a total of 6 times. He quickly became one of the most popular boxers in Japan for his peculiar "Frog Jump" uppercut punch.

He lost his 7th defense to Oscar Albarado in 1974 by KO in the 15th round. He got a rematch with Albarado 7 months later, on January 21, 1975, and managed to avenge his loss with a 15-round decision win to regain the Lineal, WBC and WBA titles. He was stripped of the WBC title in March, and lost to Jae-Doo Yuh to lose his Lineal and WBA light middleweight titles as well. However, he regained his Lineal and WBA titles in February, 1976, with a 15th-round KO over Yuh.

Wajima lost to Jose Manuel Duran in his first defense, losing the world title for the third time in his career. He fought his final match In June, 1977, challenging Eddie Gazo for the WBA super welterweight title, but lost by 11th-round KO. This was the last fight of his career. His record was 31-6-1 (25KOs).

== Professional boxing record ==
38 fights	31 wins	6 losses
By knockout	25	5
By decision	6	1
Draws	1	

No.	Result	Record	Opponent	Type	Round, time	Date	Location	Notes
38	Loss	30–6–1	Eddie Gazo	TKO	11 (15), 0:45	Jun 7, 1977	Nihon Budokan, Tokyo, Japan	For WBA and The Ring light-middleweight titles
37	Loss	30–5–1	Jose Manuel Duran	KO	14 (15), 0:50	May 18, 1976	Nihon University, Tokyo, Japan	Lost WBA and The Ring light-middleweight titles
36	Win	30–4–1	Yuh Jae-Doo	KO	15 (15), 1:47	Feb 17, 1976	Nihon University, Tokyo, Japan	Won WBA and The Ring light-middleweight titles
35	Loss	29–4–1	Yuh Jae-Doo	KO	7 (15), 2:04	Jun 7, 1975	City Sogo Gym, Kitakyushu, Fukuoka, Japan	Lost WBA and The Ring light-middleweight titles
34	Win	29–3–1	Oscar Albarado	UD	15	Jan 21, 1975	Nihon University, Tokyo, Japan	Won WBA, WBC, and The Ring light-middleweight titles
33	Loss	28–3–1	Oscar Albarado	KO	15 (15), 1:57	Jun 4, 1974	Nihon University, Tokyo, Japan	Lost WBA and WBC light-middleweight titles; For inaugural The Ring light-middleweight title
32	Win	28–2–1	Miguel de Oliveira	MD	15	Feb 5, 1974	Metropolitan Gym, Tokyo, Japan	Retained WBA and WBC light-middleweight titles
31	Win	27–2–1	Silvano Bertini	RTD	12 (15), 3:00	Aug 14, 1973	Makomanai Ice Arena, Sapporo, Hokkaido, Japan	Retained WBA and WBC light-middleweight titles
30	Win	26–2–1	Ryu Sorimachi	MD	15	Apr 19, 1973	Prefectural Gymnasium, Osaka, Japan	Retained WBA and WBC light-middleweight titles
29	Draw	25–2–1	Miguel de Oliveira	MD	15	Jan 9, 1973	Metropolitan Gym, Tokyo, Japan	Retained WBA and WBC light-middleweight titles
28	Win	25–2	Matt Donovan	KO	3 (15), 0:53	Oct 3, 1972	Nihon University, Tokyo, Japan	Retained WBA and WBC light-middleweight titles
27	Win	25–2	Domenico Tiberia	KO	1 (15), 1:49	May 7, 1972	Sports Centre, Fukuoka, Japan	Retained WBA and WBC light-middleweight titles
26	Win	24–2	Cassius Naito	KO	7 (12), 1:30	Feb 2, 1972	Metropolitan Gym, Tokyo, Japan	
25	Win	23–2	Carmelo Bossi	SD	15	Oct 31, 1971	Nihon University, Tokyo, Japan	Won WBA and WBC light-middleweight titles
24	Win	22–2	Tetsuo Hoshino	KO	2 (10), 2:41	May 28, 1971	Tokyo, Japan	Retained Japanese light-middleweight title
23	Win	21–2	Alfredo Fuentes	KO	1 (10), 3:08	Mar 26, 1971	Tokyo, Japan	
22	Win	20–2	Hideo Kanazawa	KO	2 (10), 1:45	Feb 18, 1971	Osaka, Japan	
21	Win	19–2	Hisao Minami	KO	7 (10), 2:38	Jan 8, 1971	Tokyo, Japan	Retained Japanese light-middleweight title
20	Win	18–2	Raizo Kashima	KO	3 (10), 2:34	Oct 30, 1970	Tokyo, Japan	Retained Japanese light-middleweight title
19	Win	17–2	Tetsuo Hoshino	KO	5 (10), 2:12	Sep 10, 1970	Tokyo, Japan	Retained Japanese light-middleweight title
18	Win	16–2	Muneo Mizoguchi	KO	8 (10), 2:09	Aug 9, 1970	Korakuen Hall, Tokyo, Japan	Retained Japanese light-middleweight title
17	Win	15–2	Ken Sato	KO	3 (10), 2:31	May 23, 1970	Sapporo, Hokkaido, Japan	
16	Win	14–2	George Carter	SD	10	Apr 9, 1970	Korakuen Hall, Tokyo, Japan	Retained Japanese light-middleweight title
15	Loss	13–2	George Carter	UD	10	Feb 5, 1970	Tokyo, Japan	Retained Japanese light-middleweight title
14	Win	13–1	Turtle Okabe	KO	7 (10), 2:25	Dec 18, 1969	Tokyo, Japan	Retained Japanese light-middleweight title
13	Loss	12–1	Pedro Adigue	KO	1 (10), 2:21	Oct 30, 1969	Tokyo, Japan	
12	Win	12–0	Noriyasu Yoshimura	KO	4 (10), 1:37	Sep 4, 1969	Nagoya, Aichi, Japan	Won Japanese light-middleweight title
11	Win	11–0	Rocky Alarde	KO	8 (10), 1:28	Jul 30, 1969	Tokyo, Japan	
10	Win	10–0	Alacran Kusanagi	KO	9 (10), 0:21	Jun 16, 1969	Tokyo, Japan	
9	Win	9–0	Takemi Kato	KO	6 (8), 1:00	Mar 27, 1969	Tokyo, Japan	
8	Win	8–0	Masaki Nomoto	PTS	6	Feb 3, 1969	Tokyo, Japan	
7	Win	7–0	Masami Takechi	RTD	4 (6), 3:00	Dec 30, 1968	Tokyo, Japan	
6	Win	6–0	Sozo Yamamoto	KO	1 (4), 1:25	Oct 27, 1968	Tokyo, Japan	
5	Win	5–0	Takao Higa	KO	3 (4), 1:19	Oct 6, 1968	Korakuen Hall, Tokyo, Japan	
4	Win	4–0	Tadakazu Sakai	KO	2 (4), 1:05	Aug 31, 1968	Tokyo, Japan	
3	Win	3–0	Toshiaki Kaneko	KO	3 (4), 2:00	Aug 8, 1968	Tokyo, Japan	
2	Win	2–0	Koji Watanabe	KO	2 (4), 0:52	Jun 30, 1968	Tokyo, Japan	
1	Win	1–0	Akira Takekawa	KO	1 (4), 2:41	Jun 15, 1968	Tokyo, Japan	

== Titles in boxing ==
=== Major world titles ===
- WBA light middleweight champion (154 lbs) (3×)
- WBC light middleweight champion (154 lbs) (2×)

=== The Ring magazine titles ===
- The Ring light middleweight champion (154 lbs) (2×)

=== Regional/International titles ===
- Japanese light middleweight champion (154 lbs)

=== Undisputed titles ===
- Undisputed light middleweight champion (2×)

== Post-retirement ==
Like many other Japanese boxers, Wajima became a successful television personality after retiring, and has appeared on game shows and television dramas. He became the head of the Eastern Japan Boxing Council, and has founded his own boxing gym in Tokyo. His brother-in-law also runs a successful dumpling store in Kokubunji, Tokyo. He also claims that condemned prisoner Iwao Hakamada is innocent. Hakamada was later released after 45 years in prison, due to new evidence and discovery of the prosecution's reliance on falsified evidence.

== See also ==
- List of world light-middleweight boxing champions
- List of Japanese boxing world champions
- Boxing in Japan

Sporting positions
World boxing titles
Preceded by Carmelo Bossi	WBA light-middleweight champion October 31, 1971 – June 4, 1974	Succeeded by Oscar Albarado
Preceded by Carmelo Bossi	WBC light-middleweight champion October 31, 1971 – June 4, 1974	Succeeded by Oscar Albarado
Preceded by Carmelo Bossi	Undisputed light-middleweight champion October 31, 1971 – June 4, 1974	Succeeded by Oscar Albarado
Preceded by Oscar Albarado	WBA light-middleweight champion January 21, 1975 – June 7, 1975	Succeeded by Yuh Jae-doo
Preceded by Oscar Albarado	WBC light-middleweight champion January 21, 1975 – March 22, 1975; Stripped	Vacant Title next held by Miguel de Oliveira
Preceded by Oscar Albarado	The Ring light-middleweight champion January 21, 1975 – June 7, 1975	Succeeded by Yuh Jae-doo
Preceded by Oscar Albarado	Undisputed light-middleweight champion January 21, 1975 – March 22, 1975; Titles fragmented	Vacant Title next held by Winky Wright
Preceded by Yuh Jae-doo	WBA light-middleweight champion February 17, 1976 – May 18, 1976	Succeeded by José Durán
Preceded by Yuh Jae-doo	The Ring light-middleweight champion February 17, 1976 – May 18, 1976	Succeeded by José Durán
