= Martti Lehtevä =

Finnish boxer (1931–2022)

Personal information
- Nationality: Finnish
- Born: 4 June 1931; Helsinki, Finland
- Died: 21 July 2022 (aged 91); Helsinki, Finland

Sport
- Sport: Boxing

Martti Lehtevä (4 June 1931 – 21 July 2022) was a Finnish boxer. He competed in the men's light welterweight event at the 1960 Summer Olympics. At the 1960 Summer Olympics, he lost to Willie Ludick of South Africa.
