= Iwao Hakamata =

Japanese boxer and prisoner (born 1936)

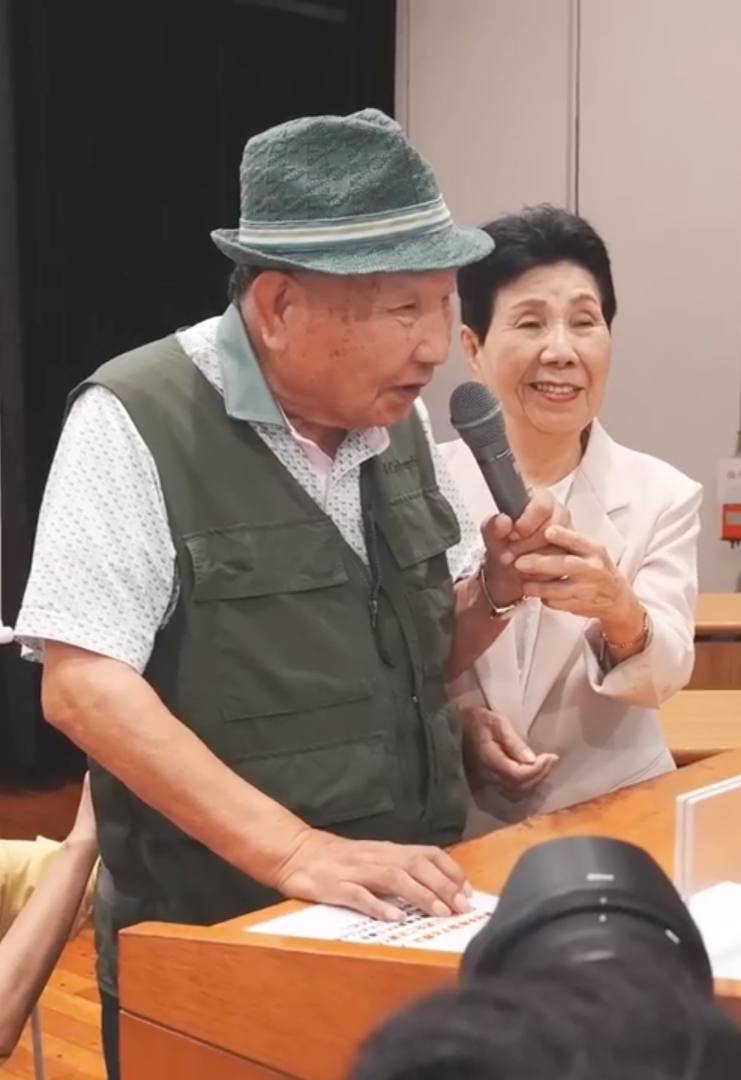
- Hakamata in 2024

Personal information
- Born: 10 March 1936 (age 90) Yūtō, Shizuoka, Japan
- Weight: Featherweight

Boxing career

Boxing record
- Total fights: 29
- Wins: 16
- Win by KO: 1
- Losses: 11
- Draws: 2

Iwao Hakamata (Note: Previously, most of the media spelt his surname as "Hakamada" because of the higher popularity of its rendaku variant within Japan. It was later revealed that the correct spelling is "Hakamata" according to his family and his house's postbox.) (Japanese: 袴田 巖, Hepburn: Hakamata Iwao; born 10 March 1936) is a Japanese former professional boxer who was sentenced to death on 11 September 1968 for a 1966 mass murder that became known as the Hakamata Incident.

In March 2014, he was granted a retrial and an immediate release when the Shizuoka District Court found there was reason to believe evidence against him had been falsified. At the time of his release, Hakamata's time on death row was the longest of any prisoner in the world. In September 2024, Hakamata was acquitted in a retrial by the Shizuoka District Court. Hakamata's innocence was confirmed in October 2024, when the prosecution waived its right to appeal. In 2025, a court awarded him 217,362,500 yen, 12,500 yen (US$83) for each day of imprisonment.

== Early life and boxing career ==
Hakamata was born on 10 March 1936 in the town of Yūtō (present-day Chūō-ku, Hamamatsu), Shizuoka Prefecture. He has an older sister, Hideko; his older brother Shigeji died in 2001. From 1959 to 1961, Hakamata fought in 29 professional boxing matches. A featherweight, he was ranked as high as sixth in his weight class.

He finished his career with a 16–11–2 record, including one win by TKO. All of his losses were on points. After his boxing career, he worked at a Shizuoka-based miso manufacturer.

== Murder and trial ==
On 30 June 1966, there was a fire at the home of one of Hakamata's bosses. According to Hakamata, he helped extinguish the fire only to find the bodies of the executive, his wife, and two children, all stabbed to death. About ¥200,000 in cash was stolen from the victims' residence.

Hakamata was interrogated and, in August 1966, he was arrested based on his confession and a tiny amount of blood and gasoline found on a pair of pajamas he owned. According to his lawyers, Hakamata was interrogated a total of 264 hours, for as many as 16 hours a session, over 23 days to obtain the confession. They added that he was denied water or toilet breaks during the interrogation.

At his trial, Hakamata retracted the confession, saying police had kicked and clubbed him to obtain it, and pleaded not guilty.

"I could do nothing but crouch down on the floor trying to keep from defecating," he later told his sister. "One of the interrogators put my thumb onto an ink pad, drew it to a written confession record and ordered me, 'Write your name here!' [while] shouting at me, kicking me and wrenching my arm."

Prosecutors put aside the pajamas and instead presented five pieces of bloody clothing that were found in a tank at the miso factory in August 1967, 14 months after the crime. They argued that the clothing came from the killer and said police had found the blood types of the victims on the clothing. They argued that Hakamata must have murdered the family in these clothes and then changed into pajamas to commit the arson.

Hakamata supporters said the case was full of holes, arguing that the alleged murder weapon – a fruit knife with a 12 cm blade – could not have withstood the forty stabbings of the victims without sustaining significant damage, and that the pajamas used to justify the arrest had disappeared and been replaced with the bloody clothing. The clothes were too small for Hakamata, but the prosecution argued that they had shrunk in the miso tank. The prosecution also claimed that the "B" label on the clothing indicated it was size medium and thus would have fit Hakamata. However, the "B" on the label indicated the colour black, not the size. The blood stains on the clothes were too dark and the colour of the clothes too light to have been lying in the miso tank.

The Shizuoka District Court discounted part of Hakamata's confession and chided the police for their interrogation tactics. Nonetheless, on 11 September 1968, the three-judge panel found Hakamata guilty and sentenced him to death. The Japan Pro Boxing Association alleged that prejudice against boxers was involved, and said the principle of innocent until proven guilty had been violated because of rampant press reports declaring Hakamata guilty. A subsequent appeal to the Tokyo High Court was denied and the Supreme Court of Japan upheld the death sentence in November 1980.

Hakamata maintained his innocence, writing to his son in 1983: "I will prove to you that your dad never killed anybody, and it is the police who know it best and it is the judges who feel sorry. I will break this iron chain and return to you." Although Hakamata remained on death row, he was not executed because the Minister of Justice refused to sign his death warrant, suspecting that the conviction was not certain. Like most death row inmates, Hakamata was placed in solitary confinement throughout his prison stay. He was not permitted to talk to guards, and was rarely allowed visitors. Hakamata served nearly 50 years on death row, 30 of which were spent in solitary confinement. Hakamata was baptized a Catholic with the baptismal name "Paul" in 1984.

== Campaign for a retrial ==
After his appeal was denied in 1980, Hakamata obtained a new team of lawyers. In 1981, they filed a request for a retrial, asking for the physical evidence to be re-examined. In the investigation, it was determined the alleged murder weapon was the wrong size to produce the stab wounds, that a door supposedly used to enter the home was actually locked, and that the bloody pants were too small to have been worn by Hakamata.

Backed by the Japanese Federation of Bar Associations (JFBA), Hakamata's lawyers concluded the first trial had failed to establish that any of the clothing belonged to him. In August 1994, after 13 years of gathering evidence, the request was heard and denied by the Shizuoka District Court. In 2000, an attempt was made to extract DNA from the bloody clothing, but available techniques did not allow for any to be detected. The Tokyo High Court upheld the retrial denial in August 2004.

In November 2006, 500 supporters, including world champion boxers Koichi Wajima and Katsuo Tokashiki, submitted letters to the Supreme Court asking for a retrial. In March 2007, Norimichi Kumamoto, the head of the three judge panel who had originally convicted Hakamata, came out in support of Hakamata's innocence. He stated that he had doubted the authenticity of the confession and believed Hakamata to be innocent. He failed to persuade his two more senior colleagues, resulting in the split judgment for conviction. He eventually resigned his position out of guilt for the conviction.

The revelation came in spite of a strong tradition against publicly revealing discussions between judges, and it resulted in Kumamoto being highly criticized. "I'm glad I spoke up", he said. "I wish I had said it earlier, and maybe something might have changed." He tried to visit Hakamata in prison to apologize personally, but his request was denied.

After Kumamoto's statement, a campaign to retry Hakamata gained momentum, led by Amnesty International and the Japan Pro Boxing Association. American boxer Rubin Carter, who served 20 years on murder charges that were eventually overturned, and British actor Jeremy Irons spoke out on Hakamata's behalf. A charity rally organized by the Pro Boxing Association attracted 1,300 supporters. Kumamoto personally submitted a statement to the Supreme Court in support of a retrial.

In 2008, the high court elected to hear Hakamata's request. On 25 March 2008, the high court denied the request, stating that neither the original or new evidence provided any reasonable doubt of Hakamata's guilt. One of the boxer's lawyers, Hideyo Ogawa, said it was a regrettable "decision handed down without much thought". The JFBA called the decision an extremely deplorable miscarriage of justice.

In April 2010, 57 members of parliament formed the "Federation of Diet Members to Save the Condemned Iwao Hakamata". The group was chaired by Seishu Makino and included members of multiple political parties. They petitioned the Minister of Justice to introduce a moratorium on the execution of Hakamata.

Also in 2010, director Banmei Takahashi released BOX: The Hakamata Case (BOX 袴田事件 命とは). The documentary film contrasts the lives of Hakamata and Kumamoto, focusing on Hakamata's interrogation and trial. The film concludes that Kumamoto was forced to "bury the truth" when it became obvious that the evidence was not sufficient to convict. The movie was nominated for the Grand Prix des Amériques at the Montreal World Film Festival.

On 10 March 2011, Hakamata's 75th birthday, Guinness World Records certified him as the world's longest-held death row inmate.

== DNA tests and release ==
A 2008 DNA test suggested the blood on the clothing used as evidence did not match Hakamata's, prompting a second retrial request from his lawyers. Further tests in 2011 supported the conclusion. On 14 March 2012, a blood sample was taken from Hakamata for a more accurate DNA test to compare with the blood sample on the shoulder of the T-shirt found among the murderer's clothes. The blood was thought to be that of the attacker, and had been previously determined unlikely to be from any of the victims. The testing revealed that the blood did not match Hakamata's DNA. The prosecution disputed the validity of the DNA tests.

In March 2014, Hakamata was released from prison and granted a retrial by the Shizuoka District Court. A statement from the court said there was reason to believe evidence had been fabricated in the original trial and that keeping the 78-year-old jailed while waiting on the retrial would have been "unbearably unjust". Amnesty International remarked, "Time is running out for Hakamata to receive the fair trial he was denied more than four decades ago. If ever there was a case that merits a retrial, this is it." A prosecution appeal of the decision to release Hakamata was denied. Hakamata was the sixth Japanese death row inmate to be granted a retrial. Four of the previous five were eventually acquitted.

According to a family member, Hakamata's mental health had badly deteriorated due to years in solitary confinement. According to an anti-death penalty activist that visited him in 2003, Hakamata was then claiming he had become "the omnipotent God" who had "absorbed" Iwao Hakamata, taken over the prison, and abolished the death penalty in Japan. A 2009 report on the death penalty in Japan by Amnesty International said a psychiatrist had diagnosed Hakamata with "institutional psychosis". For years before release, he had denied most visitation requests, including from family. Hakamata was admitted to a Tokyo hospital the day after his release, to be treated for possible diabetes.

In June 2018, the Tokyo High Court overturned the ruling that had Hakamata released. He was allowed to retain his freedom due to his age until the case returns to the Supreme Court. That August, prosecutors urged the Supreme Court to reject Hakamata's appeal to "stop the situation in which the sentence is suspended unnecessarily".

In March 2023 the Tokyo High Court ordered a retrial for Hakamata. On 26 September 2024 he was acquitted by the Shizuoka District Court, 56 years after his arrest. On 8 October the prosecution confirmed they would not appeal against the verdict, which was finalized the next day. In 2025 a court awarded him 12,500 yen (US$83) for each day of imprisonment, 217,362,500 yen.

On 11 September 2025, Hakamata filed a damages suit before the Shizuoka District Court against the Japanese state for defamation after the prosecutor general called his acquittal "unacceptable". He demanded 5.5 million yen ($37,000) in compensation and publication of an apology for one year on the website of the Public Prosecutors Office.

== Impact ==
When Kumamoto came out in support of Hakamata in 2007, it shocked the Japanese public, casting light on the usually secretive justice system. Hakamata's case caused people to question the validity of the death penalty and brought attention to what critics describe as "inhumane" elements of the Japanese justice system. In Japan, the police may interrogate a suspect for up to 23 days, and the suspect is not permitted to have a lawyer present during interrogation.

Because a false confession could be obtained easily under such harsh conditions, and because it was legal before WWII for police to torture suspects to obtain a confession, Japanese criminal courts will admit a confession as evidence only when it reveals something known only by the perpetrator of the crime. The Japanese legal system does not provide for a plea of guilty, and so, even if the accused declares guilt, the courts may find the defendant innocent if the confession of guilt is determined to be inadequate.

In capital punishment cases, to rule out the possibility that police may have forced a confession, the secret must be something that the police investigation had not known at the time of the confession. Supervision by the prosecutor, to maintain the record of investigation, is considered the cornerstone of validity of confession as evidence. Due to its reliance on confession as evidence and proof of guilt, Japanese police put enormous pressure on the suspect to confess hitherto unknown details, as this kind of confession is regarded to be as strong as forensic evidence.

The vast majority of miscarriage of justice cases in Japanese capital punishment cases involve police faking the investigative record to make it appear as if the suspect had confessed certain guilty secrets which only the perpetrator of the crime could have known, but it had later become apparent that the suspect had been forced to sign a blank sheet which the investigative police filled in with a "confession" as they wished.

Amnesty International has featured Hakamata prominently in their campaign against the death penalty in Japan. Using his case and others, they argued that "Japan's death row system is driving prisoners into the depths of mental illness". The JFBA said the case was an example of "a nest of unlawful interrogations" and called for reform, including video taping of all interrogations.

During Pope Francis's pastoral visit to Japan, the Catholic Bishops' Conference of Japan invited Hakamata and his sister to the papal Mass at Tokyo Dome. Tarcisio Isao Kikuchi, the Archbishop of Tokyo, was unable to arrange a meeting between Hakamata and the Pope. However, upon returning to Rome from the pastoral visit, Francis reiterated his rejection of the death penalty.

On October 21, 2024, Police Chief Takayoshi Tsuda apologized to Iwao Hakamata on behalf of the Shizuoka Prefectural Police. A year later, on January 29, 2025, after Hakamata was finally declared innocent in 2024 after a retrial, he filed a compensation claim of ¥217 million (approximately US$1.4 million) against the Japanese government. His legal team submitted the claim to the Shizuoka District Court, seeking financial redress for what remains the longest-known wrongful imprisonment in Japan’s history. The claim was approved on March 25, 2025.

== See also ==
- Capital punishment in Japan
- Matsuo Fujimoto
- Sadamichi Hirasawa
- Sakae Menda
- Rubin Carter
- Sayama Incident
