= Gypsy Joe Harris =

American boxer (1945–1990)

Joe Louis Harris, known as Gypsy Joe Harris (December 1, 1945 – March 6, 1990) was an American boxer. He won 24 fights and lost one; after his lone loss, doctors discovered that he was blind in one eye, which led to the revocation of his boxing license, and the end of his career.

== Early life ==
Harris was born in Camden, New Jersey, a neighboring city to Philadelphia, and was raised in North Philadelphia. His mother named him "Joe Louis", after the famous boxer, hoping that her son would become a fighter as well.

Harris trained at the Police Athletic League (PAL) gym in Philadelphia, which he joined at age 10, after he ran into the gym while fleeing from a man whose ice cream cone Harris knocked out of his hand. At the PAL, he fought briefly with Bennie Briscoe, who at the time was an AAU chapter champion. A police officer, seeing the unsanctioned fight, broke it up.

On Halloween night in 1957, a child threw a brick at Harris, which struck him in his right eye, blinding it. Harris continued to train as a boxer; he claimed that he memorized two lines of a standard eye chart to pass pre-fight physical exams, which the Pennsylvania State Athletic Commission disputed in 1969.

== Career ==
As an amateur, Harris won two national Golden Gloves championships. In his professional debut, in the fall of 1965, he knocked out Freddie Walker, the first of 24 consecutive victories.

Harris was on the cover of the June 19, 1967, issue of Sports Illustrated. The cover story described Harris, who was only 5 feet 5 inches (165 cm) tall, as a flamboyant, unpredictable, jester-like character who had just beaten Curtis Cokes, then the World Boxing Association welterweight champion, in a non-title bout at Madison Square Garden, in Harris's first fight in New York City. This was Harris's 17th fight, all of which he had won. Harris was unable to make weight, so he was unable to challenge Cokes for his title.

On August 6, 1968, at the Spectrum in Philadelphia, Harris lost by decision to Emile Griffith. The bout, which paid $12,500, was Harris's most lucrative fight, his only loss, and the last fight of his career. At a pre-fight physical for a later bout against Manny Gonzalez, a doctor observed that Harris's right eye was inflamed; upon further examination, he was found to be blind in that eye, and his license was revoked.

== Post-career ==
After his license was revoked, Harris never fought again, and pursued several other jobs, including as a street cleaner, a construction worker, and an occasional trainer for young, aspiring boxers. He became addicted to heroin and alcohol, and contemplated suicide by jumping off the Benjamin Franklin Bridge. In 1989, he worked odd jobs and received a welfare check.

Harris died on March 6, 1990, due to heart failure. He had experienced four heart attacks in the preceding two years. He was survived by his wife, two sons, and three daughters.

== See also ==
- Harry Greb, a boxer who was blinded in one eye in 1921, and who continued to fight until 1926
