= Sakae Menda =

Japanese man wrongfully sentenced to death (1925–2020)

- 免田栄
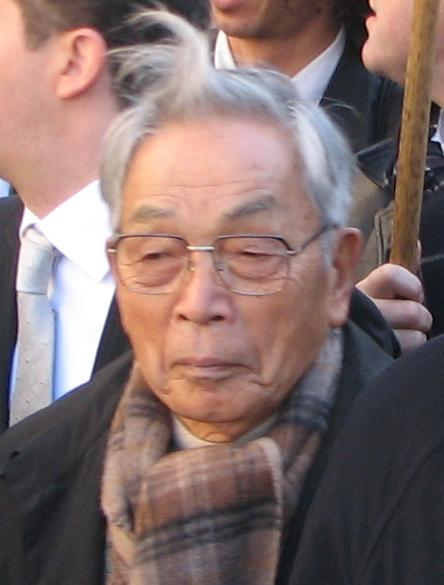
- Menda in 2007
- Born: November 4, 1925; Asagiri, Kumamoto, Japan
- Died: December 5, 2020 (aged 95); Ōmuta, Fukuoka Prefecture, Japan
- Occupation: Activist
- Notable work: Gokuchu noto
- Movement: Anti-death penalty
- Verdict: Not guilty of all charges in 1983 retrial
- Criminal information
- Status: Exonerated (1983)
- Convictions: Aggravated murder (2 counts), robbery (1949; overturned)
- Penalty: Death (overturned)
- Spouse: Tamae Menda

Sakae Menda (免田栄, Menda Sakae; November 4, 1925 – December 5, 2020) was a Japanese man who was wrongfully convicted of a double-homicide and sentenced to death in 1949, but was later exonerated by retrial in 1983. This was the first time anyone was ever released from death row by retrial in Japan. He was a leading figure in Japan for the movement to abolish the death penalty.

== Background ==
On December 30, 1948, an unknown killer broke into the house of a 76-year-old Buddhist priest and his 52-year-old wife in the city of Hitoyoshi, Kumamoto Prefecture, murdered them using an axe and a knife, and wounded their two young daughters, aged 12 and 14; during this time. In January 1949, Menda, a poor and illiterate farmhand who also sold rice on the black market, was arrested after being accused of stealing rice. He was released, but soon after re-arrested on suspicion of the murder.

== Arrest and trial ==
Police held Menda in their custody for 23 days. While imprisoned, he was starved of food and water, not allowed to sleep, and beaten with bamboo sticks while being suspended upside down from a ceiling, and not allowed access to a lawyer. One interrogator threatened to "break his head with a 1.8-liter glass sake bottle” if Menda did not confess to the murder. The police eventually coerced Menda into signing a written statement confirming he had committed the murder. A lawyer was only provided to Menda after he had confessed. The lawyer, a Buddhist monk, came to pray for him; Menda was offered no professional expertise to help him fight the charges, and instead told to accept his charges. His trial did not include any physical evidence or the witness accounts that proved Menda was at a guesthouse in the company of a prostitute when the murder took place; the prostitute was coerced by police into stating they had met on a different day. Menda was charged with two counts of murder and robbery, to which he pled innocent; he was convicted. On March 23, 1950, Judge Haruo Kinoshita sentenced him to death. The Supreme Court of Japan upheld his sentence on December 25, 1951.

== Incarceration ==
Menda was incarcerated at the Fukuoka Detention Center in solitary confinement. He was held in a 5 square meter unheated cell that was lit day and night and monitored constantly.

In prison, Menda converted to Christianity and began reading the Bible and transcribing books into Braille.

== Retrial ==
Menda submitted six petitions for retrial although initially he did not have access to a lawyer. The Fukuoka District High Court ruled on the reopening of the case in 1979.

The retrial began on September 27, 1979. The retrial allowed records that proved his alibi to be submitted, as well as a statement from a witness saying that she had lied under duress.

On July 15, 1983, after 80 judges had been involved, the court delivered the verdict of an acquittal based on a determination that he had falsely confessed and that the prosecution had failed to disclose exculpatory evidence to Menda's lawyers prior to his trial. The court acknowledged that the police had concealed his alibi, showing he was not at the scene of the crime. Menda was released at age 57 after 12,599 days (34 years) in prison. He was the first person released from death row in Japan.

== Life after release ==
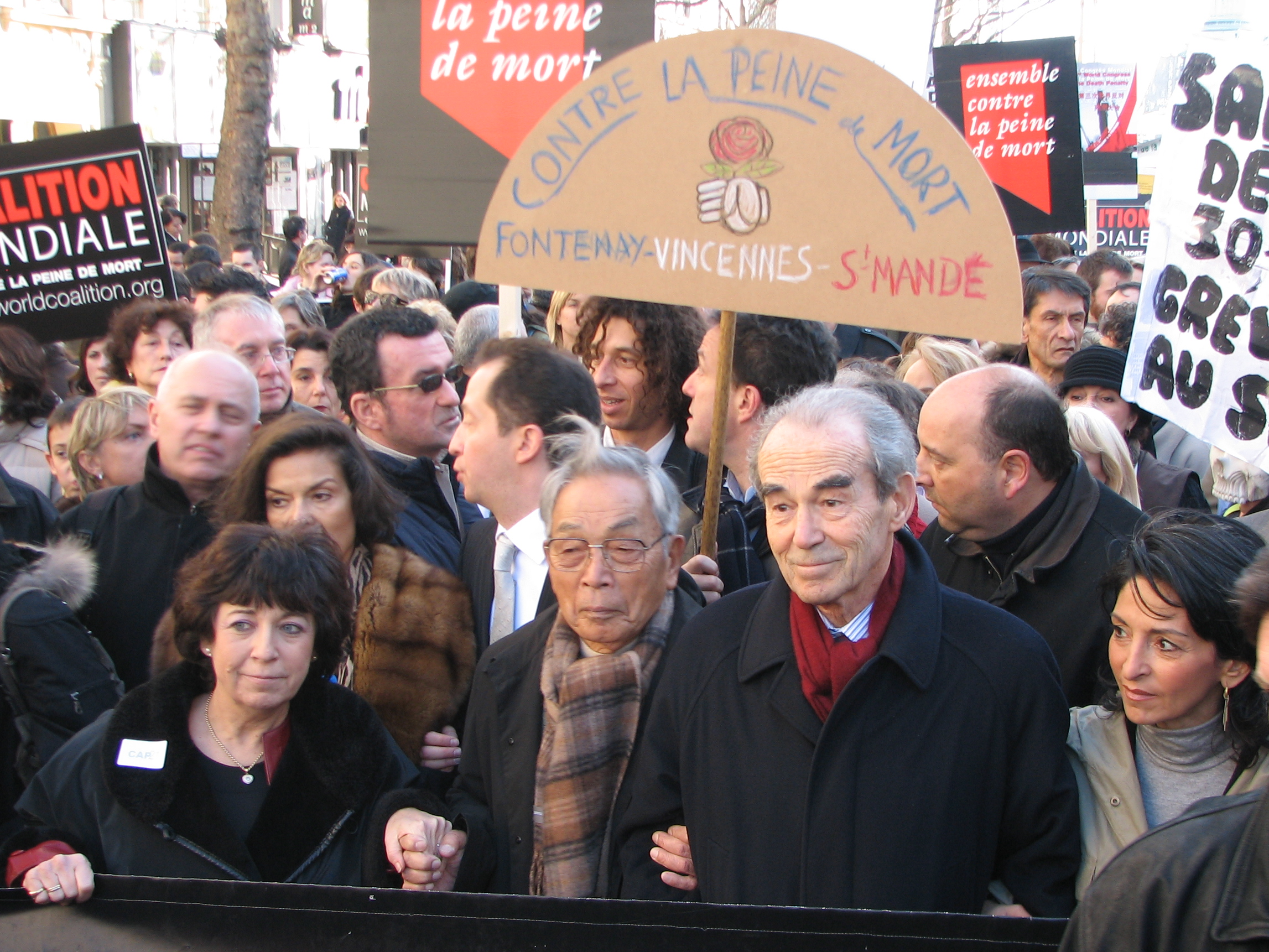
Corinne Lepage, Sakae Menda and Robert Badinter during a protest against the death penalty on 3 February 2007

The government gave Menda ¥700 for every day he was in prison: 90 million yen in total (approximately 2009 USD $990,540). He donated half of that to a group campaigning to abolish the death penalty. Menda also became a death-penalty abolitionist after his release. Japan and the United States are the only members of the Group of Seven industrialised nations to retain capital punishment. Menda spoke at the 2007 World Congress against the death penalty, and lobbied delegates of the United Nations to globally abolish capital punishment, describing the psychological and dehumanising effects that he encountered while on death row. The scandal in the aftermath of Menda's release prompted reform and aided a reintroduction of jury trials in Japan, as well as showing the Japanese legal system's over-reliance on conviction by means of confession.

Menda had difficulty claiming his state pension as he had been unable to sign up during his time in prison.

After his release, he criticised Japan's execution policy, and tried to bring an end to the practice in Japan.

He died of natural causes on December 5, 2020, aged 95, in a nursing home in Ōmuta, Fukuoka prefecture.

=== Documentary film and book ===
A documentary movie, Menda Sakae: Gokuchu no Sei (Sakae Menda: A Life in Prison), detailing Sakae's life on death row, was released in 1998. In 2004, Menda released a book, Gokuchu noto (Prison Notes).

== See also ==
- List of exonerated death row inmates
- List of miscarriage of justice cases
- Sadamichi Hirasawa
- Iwao Hakamada
- Sayama Incident
