= Matsuo Fujimoto =

Japanese convicted of murder

Matsuo Fujimoto (藤本 松夫, Fujimoto Matsuo; July 18, 1922 – September 14, 1962) was a Japanese man charged for a 1952 murder and executed by hanging in 1962. His guilty verdict, death sentence, and execution were controversial, because he suffered from leprosy and the Japanese government discriminated against people with leprosy at that time.

On August 1, 1951, a dynamite charge was set in the house of a functionary who supported the segregation of leper patients. The police arrested Matsuo Fujimoto and he was detained at a leper colony, Kikuchi Keifuen Sanatorium, in Kumamoto Prefecture. He escaped from the hospital on June 16, 1952. On July 6, the functionary was murdered. The police announced that Matsuo had killed him, and shot and captured him on July 12. Although there was none of the victim's blood on his dagger, the police extracted a confession from Matsuo.

Fujimoto's trial was abnormal, taking place in a special isolated court because of his condition. His first lawyers agreed with the prosecutors, and his supporters, including Yasuhiro Nakasone, viewed his trials as unfair. Kumamoto district court sentenced him to death on August 29, 1953, and he was eventually executed by hanging on September 14, 1962, after Kunio Nakagaki signed his death warrant.

Later, when Japanese policy against lepers was criticised as unethical, the case came under review. In March 2005, a verification committee established by the Ministry of Health, Labour and Welfare concluded that "Fujimoto's case did not even come close to satisfying the constitutional requirements."

== See also ==
- Sadamichi Hirasawa
- Sakae Menda
- Sacco and Vanzetti
- West Memphis 3
- Leprosy stigma
