= Jean Josselin =

French boxer (1940–2021)

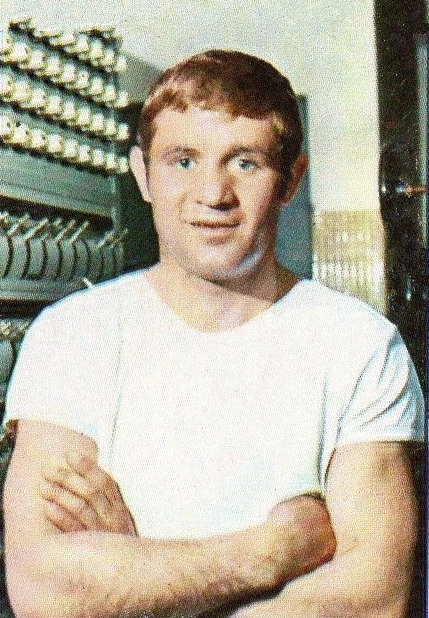
- Josselin, c. 1968

Personal information
- Born: 6 January 1940 Besançon, France
- Died: 7 February 2021 (aged 81) Gray, Haute-Saône, France
- Height: 1.70 m (5 ft 7 in)
- Weight: Welterweight

Boxing career

Boxing record
- Total fights: 89
- Wins: 66
- Win by KO: 41
- Losses: 16
- Draws: 7
Medal record
Men's amateur boxing
Representing France
European Championships
Bronze medal – third place	1961 Belgrade	-67 kg

Jean Josselin (6 January 1940 – 7 February 2021) was a French welterweight boxer. He competed at the 1960 Olympics and won a bronze medal at the 1961 European Amateur Boxing Championships. After that he turned professional and won his first 19 bouts. On 25 April 1966 he won the European title, and later in 1966 unsuccessfully contested the WBA and WBC titles against Curtis Cokes. He lost the European title to Carmelo Bossi in 1967, regained it from Silvano Bertini in 1969, and lost four months later to Johann Orsolics. Josselin retired in 1972 after a string of 8 losses, 4 draws and 1 victory.

Josselin died on 7 February 2021, aged 81, one month and one day after his birthday.
