= Miguel de Oliveira =

Brazilian boxer (1947–2021)

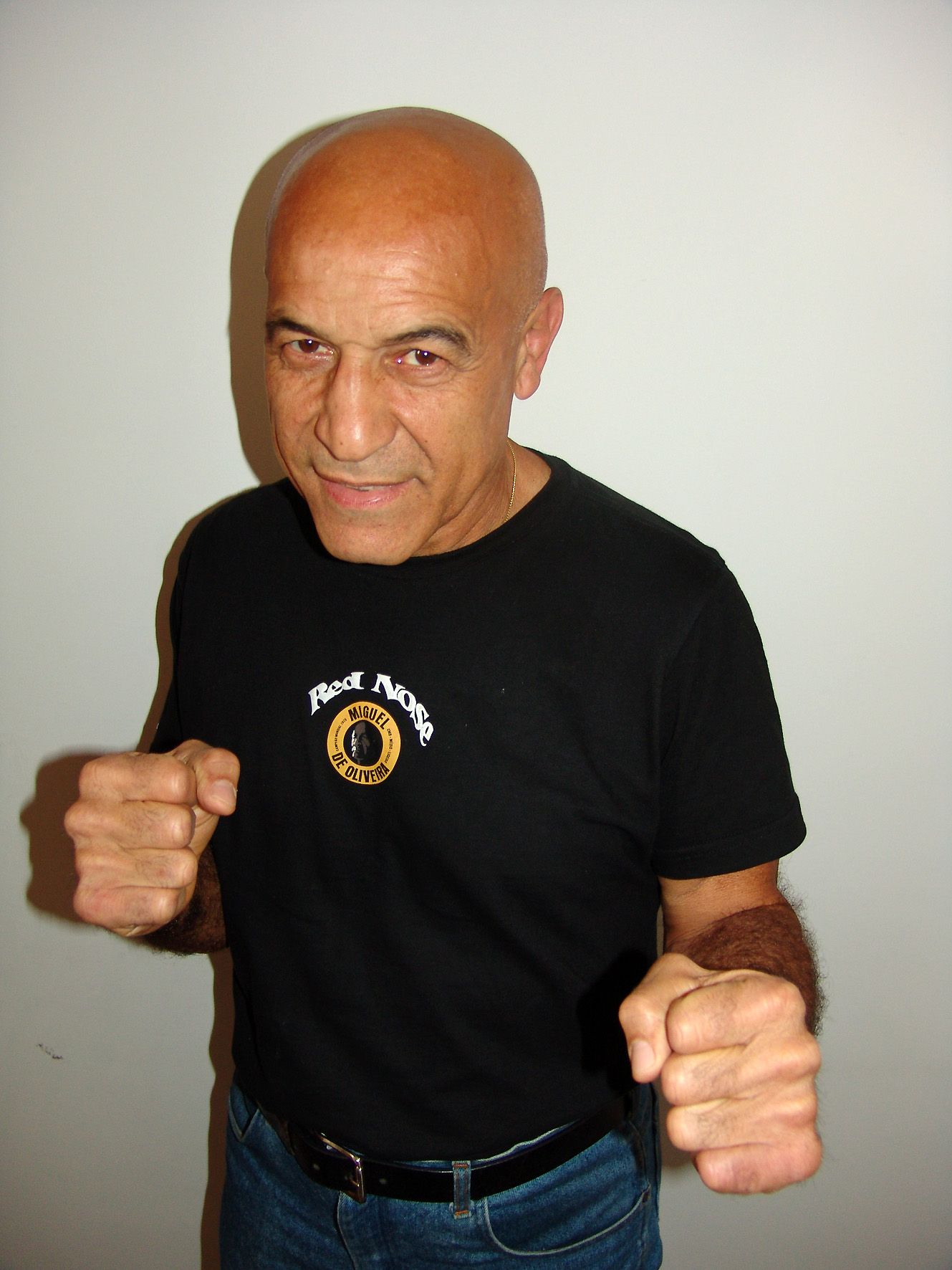

Personal information
- Born: 30 September 1947 São Manuel, São Paulo, Brazil
- Died: 15 October 2021 (aged 74) São Paulo, São Paulo, Brazil
- Height: 5 ft 8 1/2 in (174 cm)
- Weight: Light middleweight

Boxing career
- Reach: 70 1/2 in (179 cm)
- Stance: Orthodox

Boxing record
- Total fights: 51
- Wins: 45
- Win by KO: 27
- Losses: 5
- Draws: 1

Miguel de Oliveira (30 September 1947 – 15 October 2021) was a Brazilian middleweight boxer.

== Professional career ==
De Oliveira was born in Sao Paulo, Brazil in September 1947. He turned pro in 1968, & amassed a record of 29-0 before facing Japanese world champion Koichi Wajima, the fight ended in a draw. Miguel would face Wojima again a year later this time losing a majority decision. In his third title attempt he scored a 15-round Unanimous Decision against José Durán at Stade Louis II, Monte Carlo, Monaco, and won the Vacant WBC Light Middleweight Title. In doing so Miguel became just the second Brazilian to win a professional boxing title after Éder Jofre. He lost the belt in his first defense to Elisha Obed.

== Death ==
De Oliveira died from pancreatic cancer on 15 October 2021, at the age of 74.

== Professional boxing record ==
51 fights	45 wins	5 losses
By knockout	27	2
By decision	17	3
By disqualification	1	0
Draws	1	

No.	Result	Record	Opponent	Type	Round, time	Date	Location	Notes
51	Loss	45–5–1	Diogenes Pacheco	TKO	9 (10)	1980-11-04	Ginásio do Estádio Pacaembu, Sao Paulo, Brazil	
50	Win	45–4–1	Edson Lima	PTS	10 (10)	1980-09-23	Ginásio do Ibirapuera, Sao Paulo, Brazil	
49	Win	44–4–1	Crispim de Oliveira	PTS	10 (10)	1980-07-22	Ginásio do Estádio Pacaembu, Sao Paulo, Brazil	
48	Loss	43–4–1	Roque Ignacio Roldan	TD	8 (10)	1976-10-29	Ginásio do Estádio Pacaembu, Sao Paulo, Brazil	
47	Win	43–3–1	Ramon Enrique Perez	UD	10 (10)	1976-08-20	Ginásio do Ibirapuera, Sao Paulo, Brazil	
46	Loss	42–3–1	Juarez de Lima	SD	12 (12)	1976-02-21	Ginásio do Ibirapuera, Sao Paulo, Brazil	
45	Loss	42–2–1	Elisha Obed	RTD	10 (15)	1975-11-13	Nouvelle Hippodrome, Paris, France	Lost WBC light middleweight title
44	Win	42–1–1	Don Cobbs	KO	5 (10)	1975-08-09	Ginásio do Ibirapuera, Sao Paulo, Brazil	
43	Win	41–1–1	José Durán	UD	15 (15)	1975-05-07	Stade Louis II, Fontvieille, Monaco	Won vacant WBC light middleweight title
42	Win	40–1–1	Armando Vicente	RTD	6 (10)	1975-04-04	Ginásio do Estádio Pacaembu, Sao Paulo, Brazil	
41	Win	39–1–1	Juan Alcides Garcia	TKO	1 (10)	1975-03-14	Ginásio do Estádio Pacaembu, Sao Paulo, Brazil	
40	Win	38–1–1	Mario Avelino Delgado	KO	3 (10)	1974-12-06	Ginásio do Ibirapuera, Sao Paulo, Brazil	
39	Win	37–1–1	Rodolfo Rosales	UD	10 (10)	1974-11-01	Ginásio Municipal Independência, Osasco, Brazil	
38	Win	36–1–1	Dino Del Cid	KO	2 (10)	1974-07-27	Ginásio do Estádio Pacaembu, Sao Paulo, Brazil	
37	Win	35–1–1	Anibal Di Lella	UD	10 (10)	1974-05-10	Ginásio do Estádio Pacaembu, Sao Paulo, Brazil	
36	Loss	34–1–1	Koichi Wajima	MD	15 (15)	1974-02-05	Metropolitan Gym, Tokyo, Japan	For WBA, WBC & The Ring light middleweight titles
35	Win	34–0–1	Juan Carlos Artaza	KO	2 (10)	1973-11-30	Ginásio do Ibirapuera, Sao Paulo, Brazil	
34	Win	33–0–1	Manoel Severino	KO	1 (12)	1973-09-28	Ginásio do Estádio Pacaembu, Sao Paulo, Brazil	
33	Win	32–0–1	Roger Phillips	TKO	3 (10)	1973-08-04	Ginásio de Esportes Nilson Nelson, Brasília, Brazil	
32	Win	31–0–1	Carlos Marks	UD	10 (10)	1973-06-22	Ginásio do Palmeiras, Sao Paulo, Brazil	
31	Win	30–0–1	Nick Peoples	DQ	7 (10)	1973-03-16	Ginásio Municipal Independência, Osasco, Brazil	
30	Draw	29–0–1	Koichi Wajima	MD	15 (15)	1973-01-09	Metropolitan Gym, Tokyo, Japan	For WBA, WBC & The Ring light middleweight titles
29	Win	29–0	Thurman Doc Holliday	TKO	7 (10)	1972-11-17	Ginásio do Palmeiras, Sao Paulo, Brazil	
28	Win	28–0	Gunter Valtinke	KO	4 (10)	1972-09-23	Ginásio do Ibirapuera, Sao Paulo, Brazil	
27	Win	27–0	Roberto Eduardo Carabajal	TKO	4 (10)	1972-08-11	Ginásio do Palmeiras, Sao Paulo, Brazil	
26	Win	26–0	Francisco Panos	TKO	7 (10)	1972-07-07	Ginásio do Palmeiras, Sao Paulo, Brazil	
25	Win	25–0	Eduardo Batista	KO	2 (10)	1972-05-05	Ginásio do Palmeiras, Sao Paulo, Brazil	
24	Win	24–0	Luis Vinales	PTS	10 (10)	1972-03-17	Ginásio do Palmeiras, Sao Paulo, Brazil	
23	Win	23–0	Julio Calvetti	TKO	3 (10)	1972-01-21	Ginásio do Ibirapuera, Sao Paulo, Brazil	
22	Win	22–0	Jorge Rosales	UD	10 (10)	1971-11-26	Ginásio do Ibirapuera, Sao Paulo, Brazil	
21	Win	21–0	Roy Dale	PTS	10 (10)	1971-10-01	Ginásio do Ibirapuera, Sao Paulo, Brazil	
20	Win	20–0	Harold Richardson	KO	2 (10)	1971-08-06	Ginásio do Ibirapuera, Sao Paulo, Brazil	
19	Win	19–0	Matt Donovan	UD	10 (10)	1971-06-04	Ginásio do Ibirapuera, Sao Paulo, Brazil	
18	Win	18–0	Antenor Mercedes Santillan	KO	8 (?)	1971-04-23	Ginasio do Corinthians, Sao Paulo, Brazil	
17	Win	17–0	Walter Kelly	PTS	10 (10)	1971-01-08	Ginásio do Ibirapuera, Sao Paulo, Brazil	
16	Win	16–0	Walter Kelly	PTS	10 (10)	1970-12-09	Ginásio do Ibirapuera, Sao Paulo, Brazil	
15	Win	15–0	Bobby Williams	KO	3 (10)	1970-10-09	Ginásio do Ibirapuera, Sao Paulo, Brazil	
14	Win	14–0	Armando Marchissio	TKO	6 (10)	1970-08-14	Ginásio do Ibirapuera, Sao Paulo, Brazil	
13	Win	13–0	Leonardo Peralta	KO	7 (10)	1970-07-24	Ginásio do Ibirapuera, Sao Paulo, Brazil	
12	Win	12–0	Jose Inacio	KO	2 (8)	1970-05-29	Ginásio do Ibirapuera, Sao Paulo, Brazil	
11	Win	11–0	Alvacir Doria	TKO	7 (12)	1970-03-19	Auditório da TV-Excelsior, Sao Paulo, Brazil	Won vacant Brazilian welterweight title
10	Win	10–0	Vitor Timoteo	KO	2 (8)	1970-01-30	Ginásio do Ibirapuera, Sao Paulo, Brazil	
9	Win	9–0	Adalberto Nascimento	KO	3 (8)	1969-12-11	Ginásio do Ibirapuera, Sao Paulo, Brazil	
8	Win	8–0	Francisco Martinez Larroya	KO	7 (?)	1969-06-21	Sao Paulo, Brazil	
7	Win	7–0	Alvacir Doria	PTS	8 (8)	1969-05-22	Ginásio do Ibirapuera, Sao Paulo, Brazil	
6	Win	6–0	Adalberto Nascimento	PTS	8 (8)	1969-03-21	Ginásio do Pacaembu, Sao Paulo, Brazil	
5	Win	5–0	Antonio Ferreira	KO	2 (8)	1968-12-03	Ginásio do Pacaembu, Sao Paulo, Brazil	
4	Win	4–0	Altecir Pereira	TKO	5 (8)	1968-10-30	Ginásio do Ibirapuera, Sao Paulo, Brazil	
3	Win	3–0	Euclides de Queiros	PTS	6 (6)	1968-09-05	Ginásio do Ibirapuera, Sao Paulo, Brazil	
2	Win	2–0	Oscar Michel	KO	3 (6)	1968-08-09	Ginasio da Fundacao Casper Libero, Sao Paulo, Brazil	
1	Win	1–0	Alvacir Doria	PTS	5 (5)	1968-06-14	Ginásio do Ibirapuera, Sao Paulo, Brazil	

== See also ==
- List of world light-middleweight boxing champions

Sporting positions
World boxing titles
Vacant Title last held by Koichi Wajima	WBC super welterweight champion 7 May 1975 – 13 November 1975	Succeeded by Elisha Obed
