= Sayama incident =

1963 murder with possibly wrongful conviction

- Location: Sayama, Saitama, Japan
- Date: May 1, 1963; 63 years ago
- Attack type: Child murder by strangulation, child rape, kidnapping
- Victims: Yoshie Nakata (中田 善枝), aged 16
- Perpetrator: Disputed
- Motive: Unknown
- Verdict: Guilty on all counts (Note: Ishikawa was found guilty on all counts at trial in 1963. However, the verdict is highly disputed among the public.)
- Convictions: Aggravated murder; Rape; Kidnapping
- Sentence: Death (1963); Life imprisonment with the possibility of parole (1973; paroled in 1994)
- Convicted: Kazuo Ishikawa (石川 一雄) (Guilt disputed.)

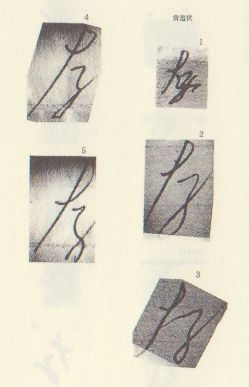
The handwriting on the ransom note (Na in hiragana)

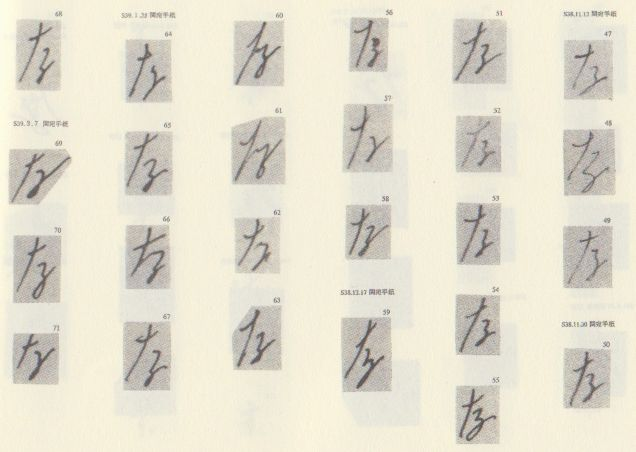
The handwriting of Ishikawa (Na in hiragana)

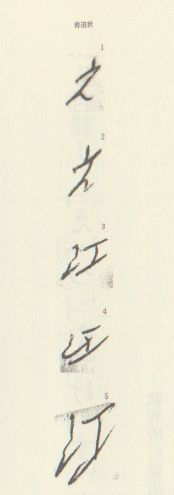
The handwriting on the ransom note (E in hiragana and 江 in kanji)

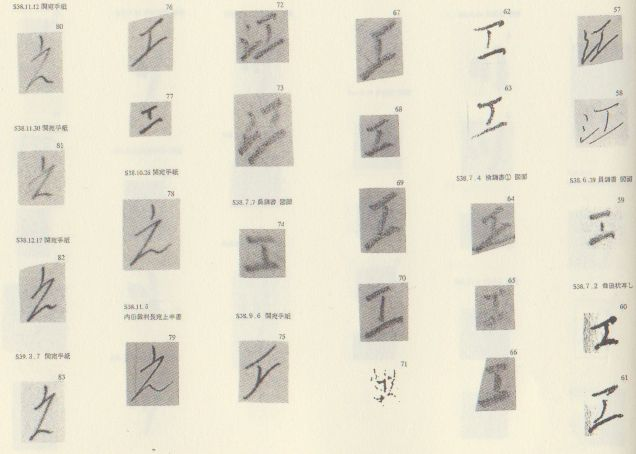
The handwriting of Ishikawa (E in hiragana and katakana, and 江 in kanji)

The Sayama incident (狭山事件, Sayama Jiken) occurred on May 1, 1963, when 16-year-old Yoshie Nakata was kidnapped, raped, and murdered by an unconfirmed individual in Sayama, Saitama, Japan. The incident, in which then-24-year-old Kazuo Ishikawa, a man of disputed guilt in the case, was imprisoned for 31 years, highlighted official discrimination against Japan's burakumin caste. Ishikawa was originally sentenced to death by hanging, but his sentence was commuted after a decade on death row to life imprisonment with the possibility of parole. Ishikawa was paroled in 1994, and advocated since then to have his convictions overturned until his death in 2025.

Kazuo Ishikawa died while on parole on March 11, 2025, at the age of 86. He was still requesting retrial at the time of his death.

== Murder ==
On May 1, 1963, 16-year-old Yoshie Nakata (中田 善枝, Nakata Yoshie; born May 1, 1947) went missing on her way home from school. Later that night, a ransom note was delivered to her house. The note demanded that someone bring ¥200,000 (approximately US$556 at the time) to a place close to her house at 12:00 am on May 2. Her sister, who later committed suicide, took fake money to the designated place, with many policemen surrounding the site. Although a man came to her and exchanged words, he became suspicious and escaped into the night, without the police catching him.

On the morning on May 4, the dead body of Nakata was found buried in an alley on a farm. Police determined that she was raped, then murdered. The media criticized the police for failing to catch the possible suspect, the same mistake made during the kidnapping case of Yoshinobu Murakoshi, which had occurred only one month earlier. On May 6, the day before his wedding, a man from the same neighborhood committed suicide. He had the same blood type as the suspect, but he suffered from erectile dysfunction, so the police thought he could not be the rapist.

== Arrest and trial ==
Near Nakata's home was the Ishida Pig Farm (石田養豚場, Ishida Yōtonjō). The owner's family and most of the employees of Ishida Pig Farm were burakumin. These employees were regarded among the buraku as dangerous for their history of theft and violence. The police investigated the Ishida Pig Farm employees and arrested 24-year-old Kazuo Ishikawa (石川 一雄, Ishikawa Kazuo; born on January 14, 1939 - died on March 11, 2025) on an unrelated charge. Although he denied the charge at first, he confessed to the kidnapping and killing on June 20.

Ishikawa and his supporters insisted that the police forced him to make a false confession by isolating and threatening him for almost a month. They also insisted that he could not read or write, but his ex-employer, who was also a burakumin, testified that Ishikawa could read the weekly magazines, newspapers, and books on traffic rules and automotive structures. Ishikawa and his supporters also insisted that he did not have the slightest knowledge of what a lawyer was and that the police exploited that fact. Supporters claimed the police fed Ishikawa false information to make him suspicious of his lawyer. Ishikawa also claimed that the police arranged a plea bargain stating that he would be freed within ten years if he confessed to the murder. In court, the police denied doing that.

Ishikawa was convicted of aggravated murder, rape, and kidnapping, and was sentenced to death. During his appeal, he began to claim his innocence and rejected any criminal liability. His sentence was reduced to life imprisonment. In 1969, the Buraku Liberation League took up his case, but they mostly used the situation to criticize his lawyer, a supporter of the Japanese Communist Party. The Communist Party in turn criticized the Buraku Liberation League. In 1975, Ishikawa's lawyer resigned, citing Ishikawa's anti-Communist sympathies. The battle between the two groups continued into 1976. Ishikawa's brother is the chief of the Sayama, Saitama branch of the Buraku Liberation League.

Ishikawa was paroled and released from prison in 1994. Along with his supporters, he was still seeking a fair retrial and the chance to clear his name. "I want the label of murderer, which is bearing so heavily on me, removed", Ishikawa said in 2002.

Since he was a member of the burakumin, a social minority frequently discriminated against, human rights groups and lawyers claimed that the courts made the assumption that he was guilty.

== Grounds of conviction ==
- The 土 of 時 in the ransom note was written as a running style of 主 mistakenly. There was the same error in Ishikawa's letter to the police chief.
- Ishikawa and the author of the ransom note share peculiar ways of writing, like these:
1. Where one should write つ in hiragana, they write ツ in katakana.
2. They mix Chinese numerals and Arabic numerals on the date of letters.
3. They mix わ and は to write は, one of the Japanese particles.
4. Where one should write で in hiragana, they write 出 in Kanji.
- Ishikawa said a three-wheeled car had passed him on Kamakura Kaidō, when he was delivering the ransom note to Nakata's house. After his confession, the police found the three-wheeler driver who had passed Kamakura Kaidō around the same time.
- Ishikawa said he had asked, "Where is the house of Mr. Eisaku Nakata?" to a farmer who lived nearby, a faf when he was delivering the ransom note to Nakata's house. Eisaku was the father of Nakata. When the police put Ishikawa in a lineup, the farmer testified that the man who asked the place was "for sure" Ishikawa.
- Ishikawa said he saw a car parked near Nakata's house when he was delivering the ransom note to Nakata's house. The police found that a fertilizer merchant had parked a compact van there around the same time.
- The dead body of Nakata was bound with a towel and a hand towel. The former was privately distributed by Tsukishima Foods Industry Co., Ltd. The latter was distributed by Isoko Beikokuten, a rice store. Ishikawa was one of the few people who could get both of them.
- During the attempted transfer of the ransom, the older sister of Nakata and the ex-military policeman heard the voice of the kidnapper. Both of them testified that that was Ishikawa's voice.
- At first, Ishikawa insisted that he was working with his older brother near his home all day long. Later on, the police found that his alibi was a lie.

== Evidence in favor of Ishikawa's innocence ==
Ishikawa's supporters claim that the confession upon which the courts’ decisions are based was coerced.

Ishikawa's supporters claim he could not have written the ransom note that was delivered to Nakata's family. Like other Buraku people of his generation, he came from an impoverished background and, as a result, he was not well educated. At the time of his arrest, he was 24 years old, lacked even an elementary school education, and was illiterate. The ransom note that was delivered to Nakata's house, however, contained many Chinese characters and was written by a person accustomed to writing. The courts maintain that Ishikawa could have copied the Chinese characters out of a magazine, but analysts have testified that the handwriting is clearly that of a different person. There is also no evidence of Ishikawa's fingerprints on the ransom note or on the envelope it was in.

Ishikawa's supporters claim the court has based much of its decision on the fact that Nakata's pen was found at Ishikawa's house. However, this fountain pen was not discovered until the third search of his residence. On May 23, the day Ishikawa was arrested, the police came to his house, woke him up and took him to jail. Twelve detectives conducted a full, two-hour search of the premises. They took several objects from as potential evidence, but did not find Nakata's pen. On June 18, a second search of the premises was conducted. Fourteen detectives participated, specifically looking for Nakata's bag, watch, and pen. They searched the entire premises for over two hours, but found nothing.

Eight days later, following these two extensive searches by a total of 26 trained detectives, the pen was found on the doorframe in Ishikawa's kitchen. Both court decisions, that of the Tokyo High Court and the Supreme Court, state that the first 26 detectives had simply overlooked the doorframe, but their reasons for why this happened differ. The Tokyo High Court said that it was because the location was too obvious, while the Supreme Court maintained that short people would have difficulty seeing the top of the doorframe. The doorframe is approximately 1.83 meters (6 feet) tall; there is a picture of the kitchen taken immediately following the second search that shows a small stepladder in front of the door.

A veteran police detective had testified that it is unthinkable that trained police investigators would have overlooked a bright pink pen on a relatively low doorframe, and even more unthinkable that such a thing could happen twice. The investigators called to search Ishikawa's house were the top professionals from the area. By the time Ishikawa was arrested, the case had already become a scandal, and the police were doing whatever it took to find the culprit. They spared no cost or personnel in conducting as thorough a search as possible. Furthermore, the doorframe is mentioned in all standard police detective textbooks as a routine location to search.

The prosecutor's case rests primarily on the confession extracted from Ishikawa while he was in police custody. However, this confession is filled with statements that violate common sense and do not match the physical layout and characteristics of the crime scene. These discrepancies, in addition to raising reasonable doubt as to whether Ishikawa actually committed the crime, also raise questions about how confessions are drafted under the Japanese criminal justice system.

There are no witnesses who have testified to seeing Ishikawa and Nakata together. This lack of testimony is odd given that the confession states that Ishikawa and Nakata walked together for several hundred meters in the middle of the day. The path they were supposed to have taken led between two fields, and the day on which this was supposed to have happened also coincided with the town's annual festival, which was being held very close by. Over ten people were working in the fields that day, and the festival drew well over 800 people, some of whom would have walked along this path on their way to the festival. The people working in the fields were questioned, but none of them remember seeing Ishikawa and Nakata together. No one else from the town stepped forward with such testimony either. This is all to say nothing of the implausibility of a 16-year-old high school student following an older man she did not know into a forest in the first place.

The confession states that Ishikawa murdered Nakata because she started to scream. In an attempt to silence her, he choked her, and before he knew it, she was dead. However, at this exact time (slightly after 4pm), a man was working in his field approximately 20 meters (66 ft) away from where the murder supposedly happened. He was questioned by the police repeatedly and testified that, while he could faintly hear the sounds of the festival over 500 meters (1,600 ft) away, he heard no screaming while he was working. In one of his last sessions with the police, he stated that he might have heard someone calling sometime before 3:30, but from the direction opposite the forest. This statement was used in the first trial as evidence that someone had heard the murder take place. The full contents of the man's sessions with the police and his exact location during the crime were not released to the defense until 1981, 18 years after Ishikawa was tried.

Ishikawa's confession says that Nakata sustained a deep cut to her head during the struggle. However, analyses of the soil in the area revealed no trace of blood. Ishikawa had also confessed that he killed the student with his right hand, inadvertently crushing her neck in an attempt to keep her from screaming. The coroner's report states that the amount of force required to do this would have left bruises on her neck – no such marks were found. Instead, there were marks from a cloth being wrapped tightly around her neck.

The confession also maintains that Ishikawa carried the 54 kg (119 lb) body from the forest back in the direction of the town and his home, where he tied a rope around her ankles and lowered it headfirst into a hole. The confession explicitly states that Ishikawa carried the body in front of him the entire distance, without slinging it over his shoulder. The defense team has conducted several experiments whereby strong young men try to carry a body weighing 54 kg (119 lb) along the same path. Not one of these men was able to carry this weight for anywhere near the entire distance. A coroner has also testified that if a fresh corpse were lowered into a hole by a rope tied around the ankles, there would be marks left around the ankles. No such marks were found.

There were a number of footprints found at both the supposed murder scene and where the body was found. However, none of these match Ishikawa's.

These discrepancies and inconsistencies have been presented to the Tokyo High Court by the Sayama Legal Defense Team as part of the third appeal for a retrial of the case.

== See also ==
- Iwao Hakamata
- Database of Wrongful Convictions in Japan
