= Willie Ludick =

South African boxer

Personal information
- Nationality: South African
- Born: 6 May 1941; Vereeniging, South Africa
- Died: 12 May 2003 (aged 62); Schweizer-Reneke, South Africa

Sport
- Sport: Boxing

Willie Ludick (6 May 1941 – 12 May 2003) was a South African boxer. He competed in the men's light welterweight event at the 1960 Summer Olympics. At the 1960 Summer Olympics, he defeated Martti Lehtevä of Finland, before losing to Vladimir Yengibaryan of the Soviet Union.
