= Boris Lagutin =

Russian boxer (1938–2022)

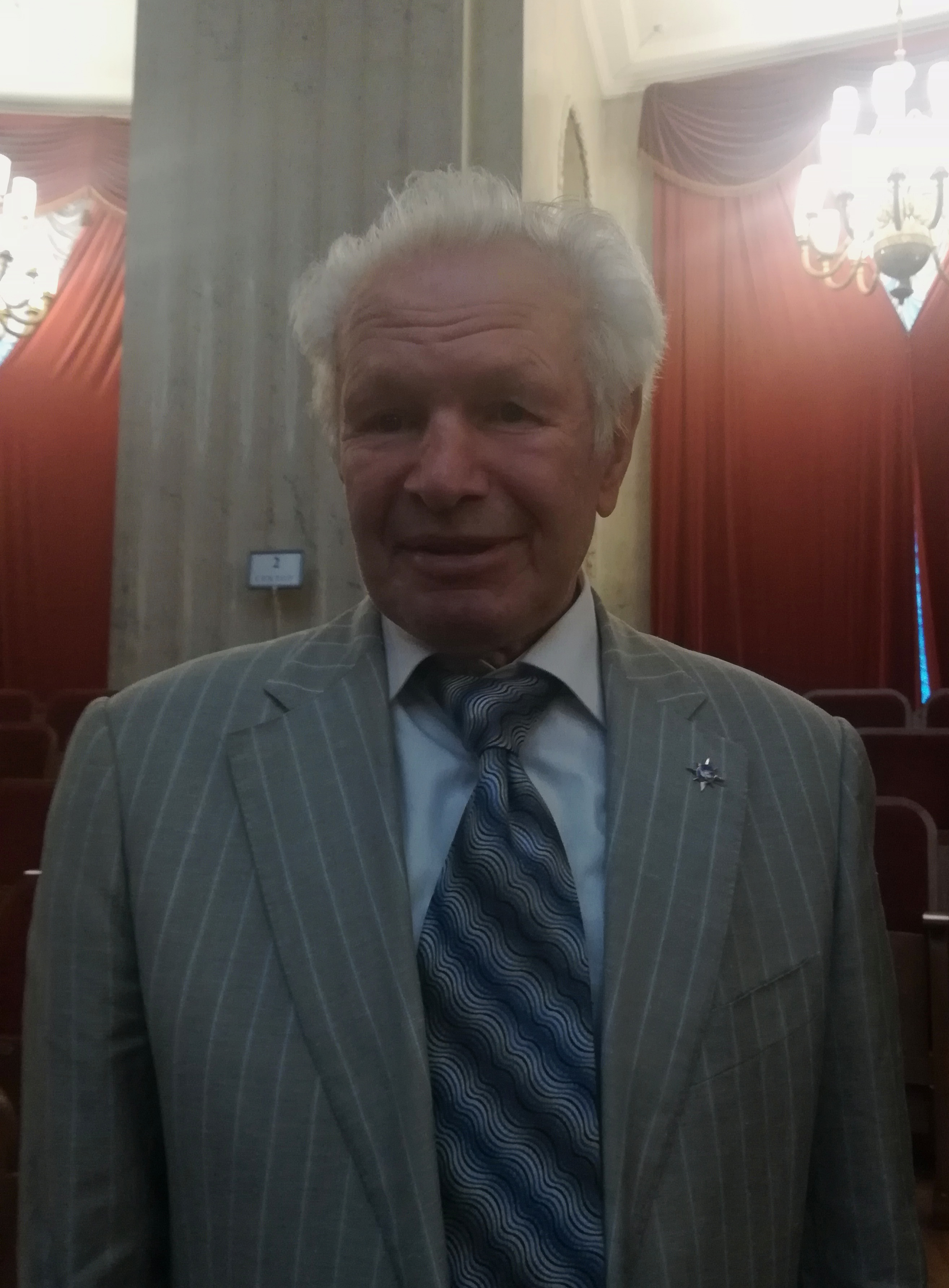
- Lagutin in 2019

Personal information
- Born: Boris Nikolayevich Lagutin; 24 June 1938 Moscow, Russian SFSR, Soviet Union
- Died: 4 September 2022 (aged 84)
- Weight: Light middleweight

Boxing career
Medal record
Men's boxing
Representing Soviet Union
Olympic Games
Bronze medal – third place	1960 Rome	Light middleweight
Gold medal – first place	1964 Tokyo	Light middleweight
Gold medal – first place	1968 Mexico City	Light middleweight
European Amateur Championships
Gold medal – first place	1961 Belgrade	Light Middleweight
Gold medal – first place	1963 Moscow	Light Middleweight

Boris Nikolayevich Lagutin (Russian: Борис Николаевич Лагутин; 24 June 1938 – 4 September 2022) was a Soviet light middleweight boxer. During his career as a boxer, he won 241 fights and lost only 11. He won medals in three Olympic Games, including two golds, in 1964 and 1968. Lagutin also won at European championships in 1961 and 1963 and at USSR championships in 1959, 1961–64 and 1968. Lagutin was born in Moscow. Until 1967 he trained at VSS Trud, then - at VSS Spartak. During the period of failures, that followed the 1964 Olympics, Lagutin was removed from the USSR team roster. Along with his trainer Vladimir Trenin Lagutin managed to find causes of his losses and earned USSR and Olympic Champion titles again in 1968.

== Olympic results ==
Rome - 1960

- Round of 32: Bye
- Round of 16: Defeated Alhassan Brimah (Ghana) by KO
- Quarterfinal: Defeated John Bukowski (Australia) by RSC
- Semifinal: Lost to Wilbert McClure (U.S.A.) by decision, 2-3

Tokyo - 1964

- Round of 32: Defeated Paul Hogh (Unified Team of Germany) by decision, 5-0
- Round of 16: Defeated Jose Chirino (Argentina) by disqualification
- Quarterfinal: Defeated Eddie Davies (Ghana) by walkover
- Semifinal: Defeated Józef Grzesiak (Poland) by decision, 4-1
- Final: Defeated Joseph Gonzales (France) by decision, 4-1

Mexico - 1968

- Round of 32: Defeated Moisés Fajardo (Spain) by RSC
- Round of 16: Defeated Sayed El-Nahas (Egypt) by RSC
- Quarterfinal: Defeated Ion Covaci (Romania) by decision, 5-0
- Semifinal: Defeated Günther Meier (West Germany) by decision, 4-1
- Final: Defeated Rolando Garbey (Cuba) by decision, 5-0

== Honours and awards ==
- Order "For Merit to the Fatherland", 3rd and 4th classes
- Order of the Red Banner of Labour
- Order of Friendship of Peoples
- Order of the Badge of Honour
- Medal "In Commemoration of the 850th Anniversary of Moscow"
- Medal "For Distinguished Labour"
- Honoured Master of Sports
