= Grzesiak =

Grzesiak is a surname. Notable people with the surname include:

- Anna Grzesiak (born 1987), Polish triathlete
- Józef Grzesiak (resistance fighter) (1900–1975), Polish Scoutmaster (harcmistrz)
- Józef Grzesiak (boxer) (1941–2020), Polish boxer
