= Boxing at the 1968 Summer Olympics – Light middleweight =

Boxing competitions

The Light middleweight class in the boxing competition was the fourth-highest weight class. Light middleweights were limited to those boxers weighing a maximum of 71 kilograms (156.5 lbs). 27 boxers qualified for this category. Like all Olympic boxing events, the competition was a straight single-elimination tournament. Both semifinal losers were awarded bronze medals, so no boxers competed again after their first loss. Bouts consisted of six rounds each. Five judges scored each bout.

== Medalists ==
Gold	Boris Lagutin; Soviet Union
Silver	Rolando Garbey; Cuba
Bronze	John Baldwin; United States
Bronze	Günther Meier; West Germany

== Schedule ==
Date	Round
Monday, 14 October 1968	First round
Sunday, 20 October 1968	Second round
Wednesday, 23 October 1968	Quarterfinals
Thursday, 24 October 1968	Semifinals
Saturday, 26 October 1968	Final Bout

== Draw ==
First round
Rolando Garbey (CUB)	RSC
Eamonn McCusker (IRL)
Eric Blake (GBR)	RSC
Bekele Alemu (ETH)
Prince Amartey (GHA)	4
Abdalla Abdel (SUD)	1
Aldo Bentini (ITA)	5
Víctor Galíndez (ARG)	0
Ion Covaci (ROU)	3
Witold Stachurski (POL)	2
Sayed El Nahas (EGY)	KO-2
José Cebreros (MEX)
Boris Lagutin (URS)	KO-2
Moisés Fajardo (ESP)
Günther Meier (FRG)	5
Honorio Bórquez (CHI)	0
Stephen Thega (KEN)	5
Walter Campos (CRC)	0
Christian Larsen (DEN)	5
Albert Menduni (FRA)	0
David Jackson (UGA)	KO-2
Rainer Salzburger (AUT)

Second round
Mario Benítez (URU)	5
Eugenio Boches (GUA)	0
John Baldwin (USA)	5
Vojtech Stantien (TCH)	0
Detlef Dahn (GDR)	2
Rolando Garbey (CUB)	3
Eric Blake (GBR)	4
Prince Amartey (GHA)	1
Aldo Bentini (ITA)	0
Ianos Kovacs (ROU)	5
Sayed El Nahas (EGY)
Boris Lagutin (URS)	RSC
Günther Meier (FRG)	5
Stephen Thega (KEN)	0
Christian Larsen (DEN)	2
David Jackson (UGA)	3

Quarterfinals
Mario Benítez (URU)	0
John Baldwin (USA)	5
Rolando Garbey (CUB)	RSC
Eric Blake (GBR)
Ianos Kovacs (ROU)	0
Boris Lagutin (URS)	5
Günther Meier (FRG)	5
David Jackson (UGA)

Semifinals
John Baldwin (USA)	1
Rolando Garbey (CUB)	4
Boris Lagutin (URS)	4
Günther Meier (FRG)	1

Final
Rolando Garbey (CUB)	0
Boris Lagutin (URS)	5
