= Kurt Mattsson =

Finnish boxer (1940–2023)

Personal information
- Nationality: Finnish
- Born: 1 March 1940; Lahti, Finland
- Died: 12 October 2023 (aged 83)

Sport
- Sport: Boxing

Kurt Mattsson (1 March 1940 – 12 October 2023) was a Finnish boxer. He competed in the men's light middleweight event at the 1964 Summer Olympics. At the 1964 Summer Olympics, he defeated Bekele Alemu of Ethiopia, before losing to Józef Grzesiak of Poland.
