= Trustee Georgia =

Historical period in the US state of Georgia

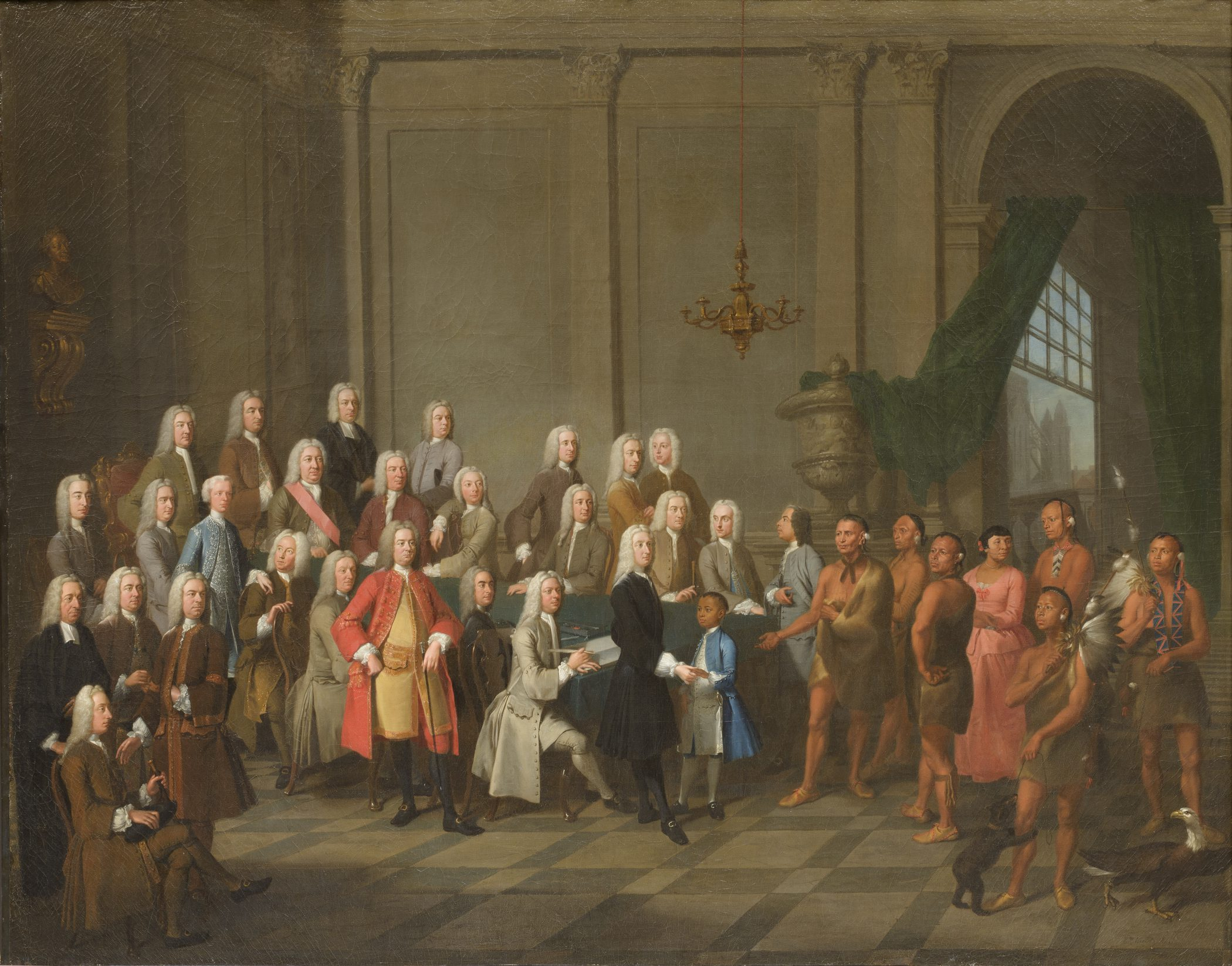
Audience Given by the Trustees of Georgia to a Delegation of Creek Indians (William Verelst, 1734)

Trustee Georgia is the name of the period covering the first twenty years of Georgia history, from 1732–1752, because during that time the English Province of Georgia was governed by a board of trustees. England's King George II, for whom the colony was named, signed a charter establishing the colony and creating its governing board on July 7, 1732.

The charter was granted to the Trustees for the Establishment of the Colony of Georgia in America, a group formed by James Oglethorpe. Oglethorpe envisioned the province as a location for the resettlement of English debtors and "worthy poor", although few debtors were part of the organized settlement of Georgia. Another motivation for the founding of the colony was to create a "buffer state" (border), or "garrison province" that would defend the southern part of the British colonies from Spanish Florida and French Mississippi. Oglethorpe envisioned a province populated largely by yeoman farmers who would secure the southern frontier of British America; because of this, as well as on moral grounds, the colony's regulations prohibited slavery.

Oglethorpe's plan for settlement (now known as the Oglethorpe Plan) was founded on eighteenth-century country party philosophy and drew from principles of Roman colonial town design.

== The Georgia Charter ==
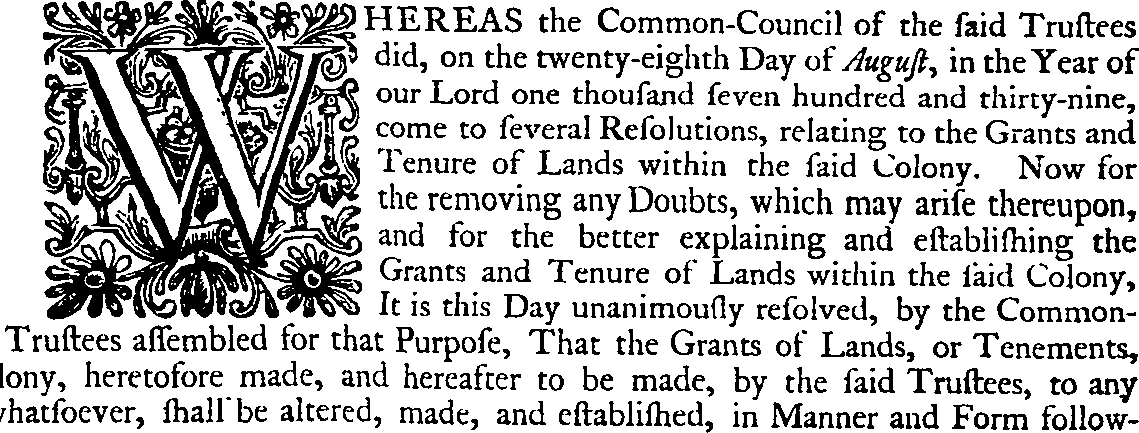
Fleuron of the Georgia Charter

The charter contained contradictions. The colonists were entitled to all the rights of Englishmen, yet there was no provision for the essential right of local government. Religious liberty was guaranteed, except for Roman Catholicism and Judaism. A group of Jews landed in Georgia without explicit permission in 1733 but were allowed to remain. The charter created a corporate body called a Trust and provided for an unspecified number of Trustees who would govern the colony from England. Seventy-one men served as Trustees during the life of the Trust. Trustees were forbidden by the charter from holding office or land in Georgia, nor were they paid. Presumably, their motives for serving were humanitarian, and their motto was Non sibi sed aliis ("Not for self, but for others"). The charter provided that the body of Trustees elect fifteen members to serve as an executive committee called the Common Council, and specified a quorum of eight to transact business. As time went on, the council frequently lacked a quorum; those present would then assume the status of the whole body of Trustees, a pragmatic solution not envisioned by the framers of the charter. Historian John McCain counted 215 meetings of the Common Council and 512 meetings of the corporation.

Twelve Trustees attended the first meeting on July 20, 1732, at the Georgia office in the Old Palace Yard, conveniently close to Westminster. Committees were named to solicit contributions and interview applicants to the new colony. On November 17, 1732, seven Trustees bade farewell to Oglethorpe and the first settlers as they left from Gravesend aboard the Anne. The Trustees succeeded in obtaining £10,000 from the government in 1733 and lesser amounts in subsequent years. Georgia was the only American colony that depended on Parliament's annual subsidies.

The original charter specified the colony as being between the Savannah and Altamaha Rivers, up to their headwaters (the headwaters of the Altamaha are on the Ocmulgee River), and then extending westward "to the south seas." The area within the charter had previously been part of the original grant of the Province of Carolina, which was closely linked to Georgia. South Carolina had never been able to gain control of the area, but after the Yamasee War the Georgia coast was effectively cleared of Indians, excepting a few villages of defeated Yamasee, who became known as the Yamacraw to distinguish them from the still-hostile Yamasee in Florida and among the Creek.

== Active trustees ==
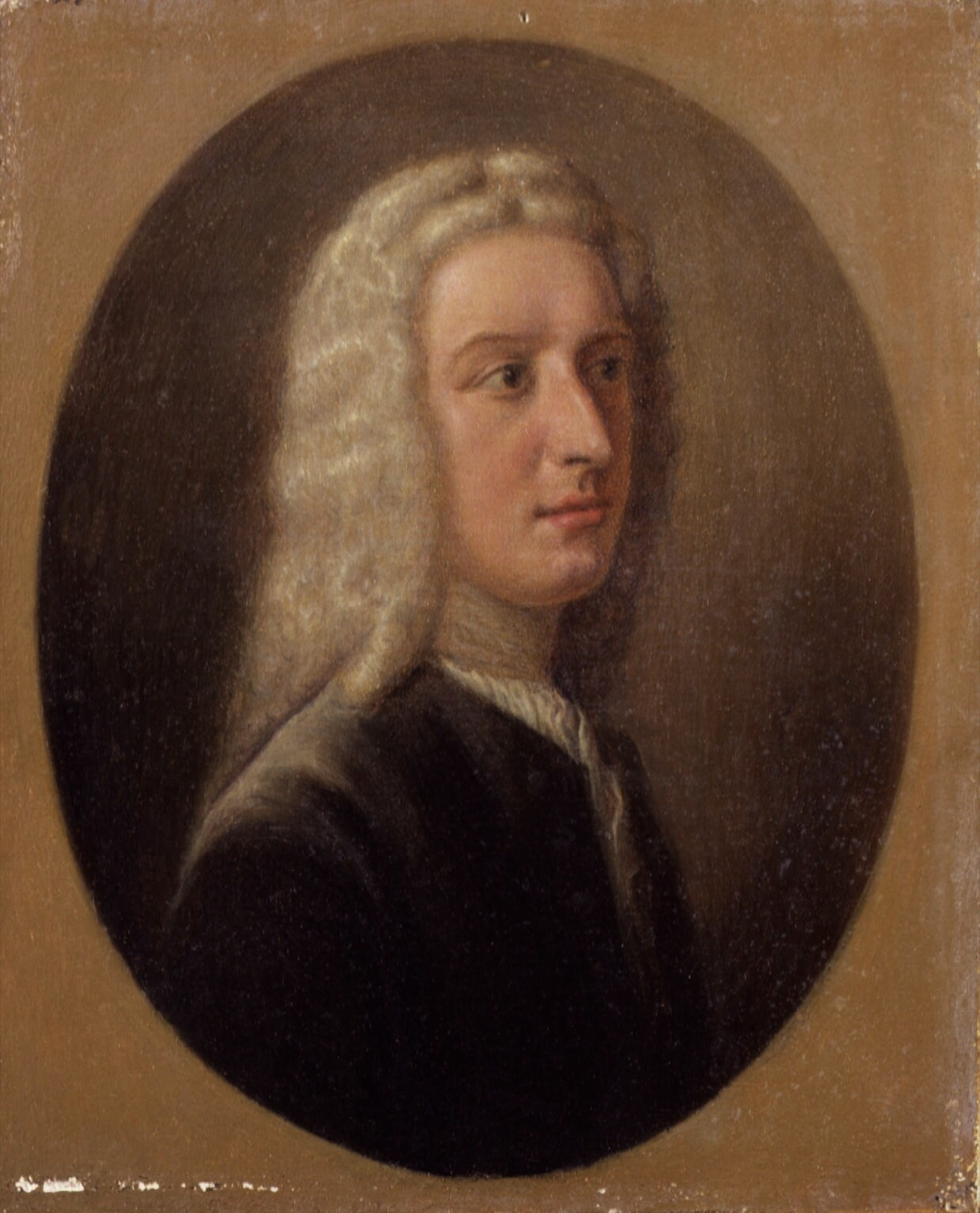
James Oglethorpe, the leading trustee

The most active members of the Trust, in terms of their attendance at council, corporation, or committee meetings, were, in order of frequency, James Vernon, John Perceval, Earl of Egmont, Henry L'Apostre, Samuel Smith, Thomas Tower, John LaRoche, Robert Hucks, Stephen Hales, James Oglethorpe, and Anthony Ashley Cooper, 4th Earl of Shaftesbury. The number of meetings attended ranged from Vernon's 712 to Shaftesbury's 266. Sixty-one Trustees attended fewer meetings. James Vernon, one of the original Associates of Dr. Bray and an architect of the charter, maintained an interest in Georgia throughout the life of the Trust. He arranged the Salzburger settlement and negotiated with the Society for the Propagation of the Gospel in Foreign Parts for missionaries.

He differed from Egmont and Oglethorpe in his willingness to respond to the colonists' complaints. When Oglethorpe became preoccupied with the Spanish war, Vernon proposed the plan of dividing the colony into two provinces, Savannah and Frederica, each with a president and magistrates. The Trustees named William Stephens president in Savannah, and he served until 1751, when he was replaced by Henry Parker in the final year of the Trust's tenure. Oglethorpe neglected to name a president for Frederica, and the magistrates there were instructed to report to Stephens. The Trustees did not want to appoint a single governor because the king in council had to approve the appointment of governors, and the Trustees preferred to keep control in their hands. After Egmont's retirement in 1742, Vernon became the indispensable man. He missed only 4 of 114 meetings during the last nine years of the Trust and supervised the removal of restrictions on land tenure, rum, and slavery.

Egmont, the first president of the Common Council and the dominant figure among the Trustees until his retirement, acted as Georgia's champion in Parliament. He strongly opposed Robert Walpole's attempts to conciliate Spain at the expense of Georgia. He had to walk a careful line, however, because the Trustees depended upon Walpole for their annual subsidies.

Other Trustees contributed according to their abilities. Henry L'Apostre advised on finances, Samuel Smith on religion, and Thomas Tower on legal matters, particularly on instructions to Georgia officials. Stephen Hales's closeness to the royal family and his standing as a scientist lent prestige to the body of Trustees. Shaftesbury, a political opponent of Walpole, joined the Common Council in 1733 and, except for a brief resignation, remained faithful to the end. He led the negotiations to convert Georgia to a royal colony. For the entire twenty years the Trustees employed only two staff members, Benjamin Martyn as secretary and Harman Verelst as accountant.

== Georgia Indians in London ==
Oglethorpe returned to England in June 1734 with goodwill ambassadors in the persons of Yamacraw chief Tomochichi, Senauki, his wife, their nephew Toonahowi, and six other Lower Creek tribesmen. The Indians were regarded as celebrities, feted by the Trustees, interviewed by the king and queen, entertained by the archbishop of Canterbury at Lambeth Palace, and made available to meet the public. All but two of them posed with a large number of Trustees at the Georgia office for the painter William Verelst. One of the absent Indians died of smallpox, despite the ministrations of the eminent physician Sir Hans Sloane, and was buried by his grieving comrades in the burial plot of St. John's in Westminster. After performing their social obligations, the Indians became tourists, visiting the Tower of London, St. Paul's Cathedral, Oglethorpe's Westbrook Manor, and Egmont's Charlton House, and enjoying a variety of plays, from Shakespearean dramas to comic farces.

== Salzburgers, Moravians and Highlanders ==
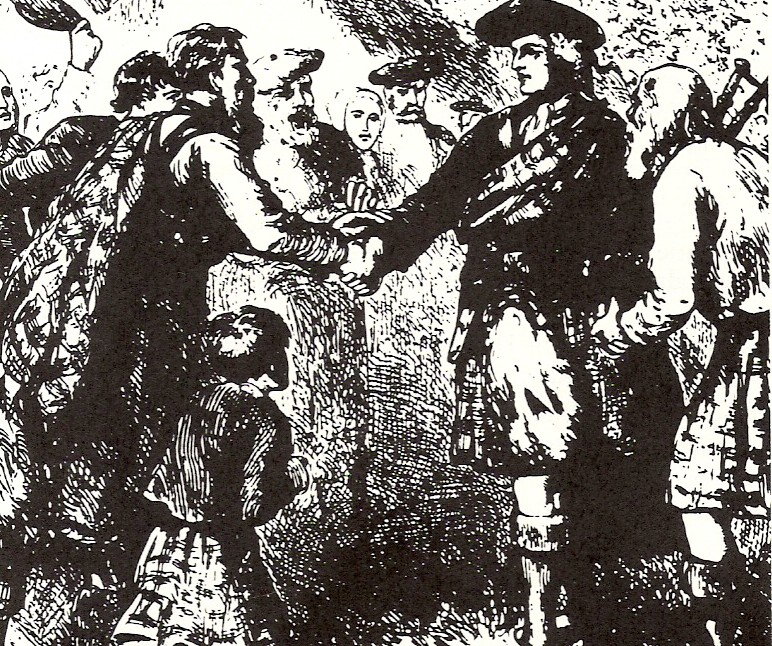
Oglethorpe greeting Highland settlers in Darien on 22 February 1736

The Indians departed on October 31, 1734. With them went fifty-seven Salzburgers to join the forty-two families already in Georgia at Ebenezer. In 1734 and 1735 two groups of Moravians went to Georgia. As pacifists they opposed doing military duty and left Georgia by 1740. After delivering the Indians and Salzburgers to Georgia, Captain George Dunbar took his ship, the Prince of Wales, to Scotland. Dunbar and Hugh Mackay recruited 177 Highlanders, most of them members of Clan Chattan in Inverness-shire. In 1736 the Highlanders founded Darien on Georgia's southern boundary, the Altamaha. Dunbar subsequently served as Oglethorpe's aide in Georgia and in Oglethorpe's campaign against the Spanish in 1745.

Oglethorpe went to Georgia in 1736, with the approval of his fellow Trustees, to found two new settlements on the frontiers, Frederica on St. Simons Island and Augusta at the headwaters of the Savannah River in Indian country. Both places were garrisoned by troops. In 1737 Oglethorpe returned to England to demand a regiment of regulars from a reluctant Walpole. Not only did he get his regiment and a commission as colonel, but Egmont persuaded Walpole to pay for all military expenses.

== Trustee legislation and reactions ==
In 1735, the Trustees proposed three pieces of legislation to the Privy Council and had the satisfaction of securing the concurrence of king and council. An Indian act required Georgia licenses for trading west of the Savannah River. Another act banned the use of rum in Georgia. A third act outlawed slavery in Georgia. South Carolina protested the Indian act vehemently and objected to the Trustees' order to restrict the passage of rum on the Savannah River. The Board of Trade sided with South Carolina, and a compromise was reached, allowing traders with Carolina licenses to continue their traditional trade west of the Savannah River. The Trustees objected to the Board of Trade's tampering and refrained from proposing any additional legislation requiring approval of the Privy Council.

Continual complaints by the colonists and the near abandonment of Georgia during the war with Spain discouraged all but the most dedicated of the Trustees. Especially embarrassing was the list of grievances presented on the floor of Parliament by Thomas Stephens, son of the Trustees' agent in Georgia, William Stephens. A committee went through the motions of looking into the complaints and then exonerated the Trustees. Stephens was made to kneel in apology on the floor of Parliament. However, the prestige of the Trustees had been wounded, and their influence in Parliament weakened. Walpole lost office in 1742, and the new administration declined the Trustees' request for funding. Egmont resigned in protest, but not all the Trustees gave up. Under the leadership of Vernon and Shaftesbury, the Trustees conciliated the administration, and the government renewed the annual subsidies until 1751, when the Trustees' request was again denied.

Oglethorpe returned from Georgia in 1743 and never again showed the same enthusiasm for the work of the Trust. He disagreed with the relaxation of the ban on rum in 1742 and with the admission of slavery in 1750. He engaged in an unfortunate argument with the Trustees over expenses. The accountant claimed that he owed the Trust £1,412 of funds used for military purposes for which he had been compensated. Oglethorpe countered that the Trustees owed him far more than that amount. No agreement was reached. Oglethorpe attended his last meeting on March 16, 1749.

== End of Trustee rule ==
In March 1750 the Trustees called upon Georgians to elect delegates to the first representative assembly but cautioned them only to advise the Trustees, not to legislate. Augusta and Ebenezer each had two delegates, Savannah had four, and every other town and village had one. Frederica, now practically abandoned, sent no delegate. Sixteen representatives met in Savannah on January 14, 1751, and elected Francis Harris speaker. Most of the resolutions concerned improving trade. The delegates showed maturity in requesting the right to enact local legislation, and they opposed any annexation effort on the part of South Carolina. The Trustees intended to permit further assemblies, but the failure of Parliament to vote a subsidy in 1751 caused the Trustees to enter into negotiations to turn the colony over to the government a year before the charter expired. Only four members of the Trust attended the last meeting on June 23, 1752, and of the original Trustees only James Vernon persevered to the end.

The earl of Halifax, the new president of the Board of Trade, secured broader powers and infused new life into the administration of the board. He regretted that the colonies had been neglected for so long, and he intended to make Georgia a model colony and an example to others. Thus Georgia passed from the control of one set of gentlemen of Parliament to another.

== See also ==
- Georgia Experiment
- Trustees for the Establishment of the Colony of Georgia in America
