= Fratto =

Fratto is a surname. Notable people with the surname include:

- Joseph C. Fratto Jr. (born 1949), American judge
- Louis Fratto (1906-1967), American mobster
- Rocky Fratto (born 1958), American boxer
- Rudy Fratto (born 1943), American mobster
- Tony Fratto (born 1966), American government official
