= Boxing at the 1964 Summer Olympics – Light middleweight =

Boxing competitions

The light middleweight class in the boxing at the 1964 Summer Olympics competition was the fourth-heaviest class. Light middleweights were limited to those boxers weighing less than 71 kilograms. 25 boxers from 25 nations competed.

== Medalists ==
Gold	Boris Lagutin; Soviet Union
Silver	Joseph Gonzales; France
Bronze	Nojim Maiyegun; Nigeria
Bronze	Jozef Grzesiak; Poland

== Results ==
Round of 32; 13 October
Masuda (JPN)	W
J. Gibson (RHO)	RSC
T. Gibson (USA)	W
Thiancharoen (THA)	RSC
Davies (GHA)	5
Sebok (HUN)	0
Hogh (EUA)	0
Lagutin (URS)	5
Elliott (JAM)	0
Chirino (ARG)	5
Grzesiak (POL)	5
Bruschini (ITA)	0
Mattsson (FIN)	4
Alemou (ETH)	1
Fabre (BRA)	1
Elnahas (EGY)	4
Lee (KOR)	0
Mirza (ROU)	5

Round of 16; 17 October
Bogs (DEN)	W
Chen (ROC)	RSC
Maiyegun (NGR)	W
Robinson (GBR)	RSC
Ocampo (PHI)	0
Barber (AUS)	5
Gonzales (FRA)	3
Masuda (JPN)	2
T. Gibson (USA)	0
Davies (GHA)	5
Lagutin (URS)	W
Chirino (ARG)	DQ
Grzesiak (POL)	5
Mattsson (FIN)	0
Elnahas (EGY)	2
Mirza (ROU)	3

Quarterfinals; 20 October
Bogs (DEN)	RSC
Maiyegun (NGR)	W
Barber (AUS)	RSC
Gonzales (FRA)	W
Davies (GHA)	DNF
Lagutin (URS)	W
Grzesiak (POL)	4
Mirza (ROU)	1

Semifinals; 21 October
Maiyegun (NGR) (bronze)	2
Gonzales (FRA)	3
Lagutin (URS)	4
Grzesiak (POL) (bronze)	1

Final; 23 October
Gonzales (FRA) (silver)	1
Lagutin (URS) (gold)	4

== Sources ==
Tokyo Organizing Committee (1964). The Games of the XVIII Olympiad: Tokyo 1964, vol. 2.
