= Józef Grzesiak =

Józef Grzesiak may refer to:

- Józef Grzesiak (resistance fighter) (1900–1975), Polish Scoutmaster (harcmistrz)
- Józef Grzesiak (boxer) (1941–2020), Polish boxer
