= Lee Kum-taik =

South Korean boxer (born 1942)

Personal information
- Nationality: South Korean
- Born: 13 January 1942 (age 83)

Sport
- Sport: Boxing

Lee Kum-taik (born 13 January 1942) is a South Korean boxer. He competed in the men's light middleweight event at the 1964 Summer Olympics. At the 1964 Summer Olympics, he lost to Vasile Mirza of Romania.
