= José Cebreros =

Mexican boxer (born 1947)

Personal information
- Full name: José Guadalupe Cebreros
- Born: 10 November 1947 (age 77); El Dorado, Mexico

Sport
- Sport: Boxing

José Guadalupe Cebreros (born 10 November 1947) is a Mexican boxer. He competed in the men's light middleweight event at the 1968 Summer Olympics where he was defeated in the first round by Soviet fighter Boris Lagutin.
