= José Roberto Chirino =

Argentine boxer

Personal information
- Nationality: Argentine
- Born: 22 September 1944 (age 80)

Sport
- Sport: Boxing

José Roberto Chirino (born 2 September 1944) is an Argentine boxer. He competed in the men's light middleweight event at the 1964 Summer Olympics. At the 1964 Summer Olympics, he defeated John Elliott of Jamaica, before losing to Boris Lagutin of the Soviet Union.
