= Honorio Bórquez =

Chilean boxer (1947–2024)

Personal information
- Born: 5 September 1947 Maullín, Chile
- Died: 17 November 2024 (aged 77) Puerto Montt, Chile

Sport
- Sport: Boxing

Honorio Bórquez (5 September 1947 – 17 November 2024) was a Chilean boxer. He competed in the men's light middleweight event at the 1968 Summer Olympics. At the 1968 Summer Olympics, he lost to Stephen Thega of Kenya.

Bórquez was thrice the Chilean national boxing champion from 1967 to 1969 and also won the light middleweight title at the 1968 Latin American Championships. Later, he dedicated himself to training new generations of boxers at the boxing school that bears his name in the Modelo neighborhood of Puerto Montt.

Bórquez died on 17 November 2024, at the age of 77.
