= Paulina Kotfica =

Polish triathlete (born 1986)

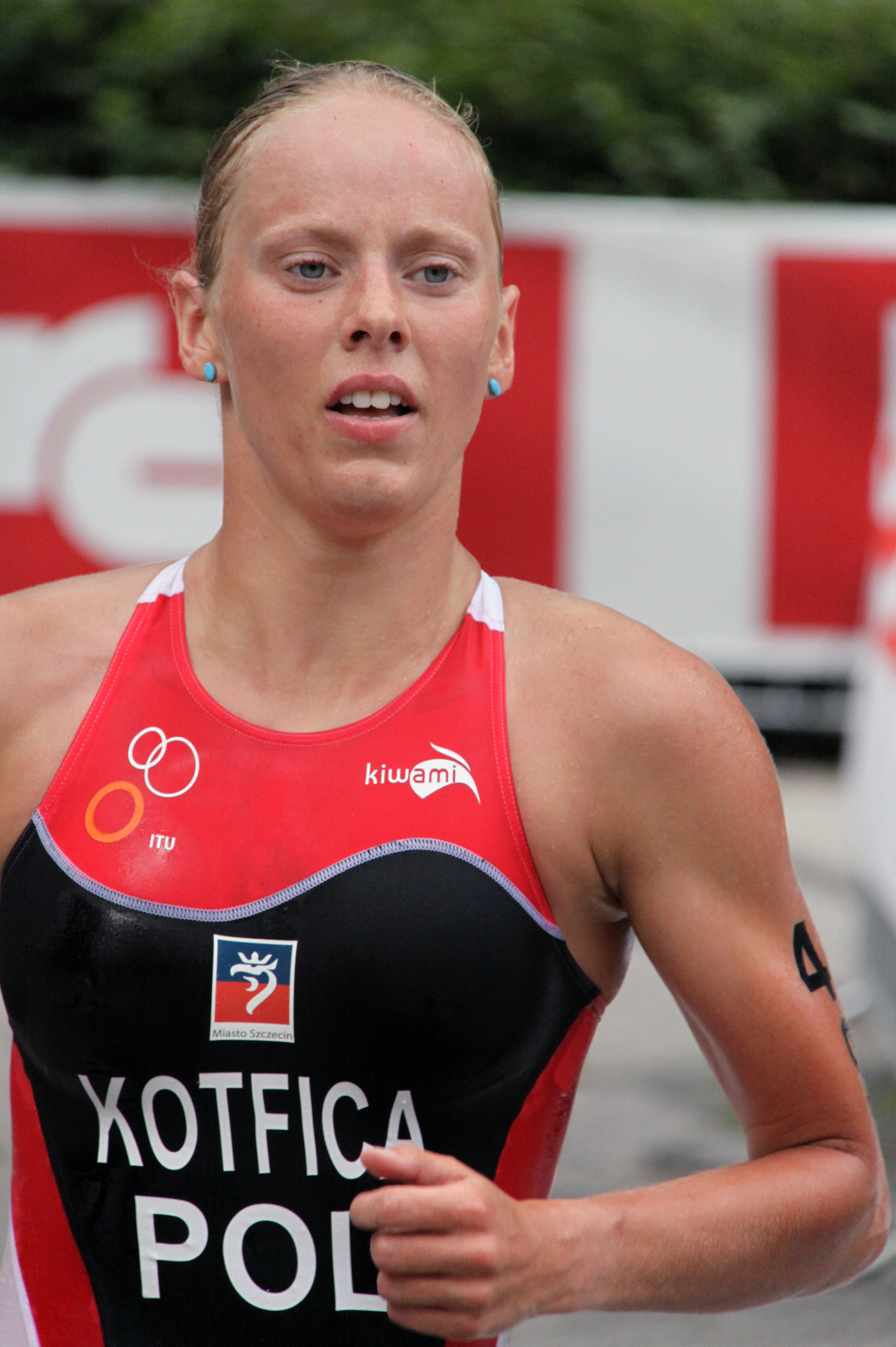
Paulina Kotfica at the World Championship Series triathlon in Kitzbühel, 2010.

Paulina Kotfica (born 15 May 1986, in Szczecin) is a Polish professional triathlete and the Polish Championships 2010 bronze medalist.

In the seven years from 2004 to 2010, Paulina Kotfica took part in 35 ITU competitions and achieved 9 top ten positions. In 2010, she achieved four top ten positions at (Premium) European Cups and the World University Championships in Valencia, where Kotfica placed 6th in the individual ranking and 1st in the team ranking together with Agnieszka Jerzyk and Anna Grzesiak.

In Poland Paulina Kotfica represents the club KS Biuro Podróż AS Szczecin. In 2011, Kotfica will also represent the club EJOT in the German Bundesliga circuit.

== ITU Competitions ==
The following list is based upon the official ITU rankings and the athlete's ITU Profile Page. Unless indicated otherwise, all competitions enumerated below are Olympic Distance Triathlons and belong to the Elite category.

Date	Competition	Place	Rank
2004-07-03	European Championships (Junior)	Lausanne	DNF
2005-07-23	European Championships (Junior)	Alexandroupolis	27
2006-05-27	European Cup	Portorož	7
2006-07-08	European Championships (U23)	Rijeka	21
2006-09-02	World Championships (U23)	Lausanne	DNF
2006-09-17	Premium European Cup	Kedzierzyn Kozle	11
2007-04-15	BG World Cup	Ishigaki	DNF
2007-05-13	BG World Cup	Richards Bay	38
2007-05-20	Premium European Cup	Sanremo	DNS
2007-06-29	European Championships	Copenhagen	39
2007-07-21	European Championships (U23)	Kuopio	16
2007-08-11	BG World Cup	Tiszaújváros	44
2007-08-30	BG World Championships (U23)	Hamburg	13
2007-09-09	Premium European Cup	Kedzierzyn Kozle	DNS
2008-04-19	Premium European Cup	Pontevedra	DNS
2008-05-10	European Championships	Lisbon	DNS
2008-08-10	European Cup	Karlovy Vary (Carlsbad)	8
2008-08-24	European Cup and Small States of Europe Championships	Weiswampach	9
2008-09-06	European Championships (U23)	Pulpí	12
2008-09-07	Premium European Cup	Kedzierzyn Kozle	DNS
2008-09-27	BG World Cup	Lorient	DNS
2008-10-26	Premium European Cup	Alanya	16
2009-05-17	Premium European Cup	Pontevedra	17
2009-05-31	Dextro Energy World Championship Series	Madrid	DNF
2009-06-20	European Championships (U23)	Tarzo	9
2009-06-27	Elite Cup	Hy-Vee	34
2009-08-09	World Cup	Tiszaújváros	27
2009-08-23	European Cup	Karlovy Vary (Carlsbad)	9
2009-09-09	Dextro Energy World Championship Series, Grand Final (U23)	Gold Coast	17
2009-09-26	European Cup	Mar Menor	13
2009-11-08	World Cup	Huatulco	16
2010-04-25	World Cup	Ishigaki	DNS
2010-05-23	European Cup	Strathclyde	5
2010-05-28	FISU 10th World University Triathlon Championships	Valencia	6
2010-06-27	Premium European Cup	Brasschaat	6
2010-07-10	World Cup	Holten	30
2010-07-17	Dextro Energy World Championship Series	Hamburg	40
2010-08-08	World Cup	Tiszaújváros	25
2010-08-15	Dextro Energy World Championship Series	Kitzbühel	38
2010-09-08	Dextro Energy World Championship Series, Grand Final	Budapest	43
2010-09-19	European Cup and Balkan Championships	Loutraki	3
2010-10-10	World Cup	Huatulco	DNF

BG = the sponsor British Gas · DNF = did not finish · DNS = did not start
