= Bruschini =

Bruschini is an Italian surname. Notable people with the surname include:

- Angelo Bruschini, English rock guitarist
- Laura Bruschini (born 1966), Italian beach volleyball player
- Massimo Bruschini (1942–1979), Italian boxer
