= Yot Sangthien =

Thai boxer

Personal information
- Nationality: Thai
- Born: 19 January 1938 (age 87)

Sport
- Sport: Boxing

Yot Sangthien (born 19 January 1938) is a Thai boxer. He competed in the men's light middleweight event at the 1964 Summer Olympics. At the 1964 Summer Olympics, he lost to Tolman Gibson of the United States.
