= Mario Benítez (boxer) =

Uruguayan boxer (1946–2023)

Personal information
- Born: 16 March 1946; Salto, Uruguay
- Died: 24 October 2023 (aged 77); Montevideo, Uruguay

Sport
- Sport: Boxing

Mario Eustaquio Benítez (16 March 1946 – 24 October 2023) was a Uruguayan boxer. He competed in the men's light middleweight event at the 1968 Summer Olympics. At the 1968 Summer Olympics, he defeated Eugenio Boches of Guatemala, before losing to John Baldwin of the United States. Benítez died in Montevideo on 24 October 2023, at the age of 77.
