= Vojtech Stantien =

Slovak boxer

Personal information
- Nationality: Slovak
- Born: 15 January 1939 (age 87) Kassa, Hungary

Sport
- Sport: Boxing

Vojtech Stantien (born 15 January 1939) is a Slovak boxer. He competed in the men's light middleweight event at the 1968 Summer Olympics.
