= Eugenio Boches =

Guatemalan boxer

Personal information
- Born: 13 August 1939 (age 87) Guatemala City, Guatemala

Sport
- Sport: Boxing

Eugenio Boches (born 13 August 1939) is a Guatemalan boxer. He competed in the men's light middleweight event at the 1968 Summer Olympics. At the 1968 Summer Olympics, he lost to Mario Benítez of Uruguay.
