= Tadashi Mihara =

Personal information
- Nickname: Oriental Express
- Born: Tadashi Mihara; March 30, 1955 (age 71) Takasaki, Gunma, Japan
- Height: 5 ft 10 in (1.78 m)
- Weight: Light middleweight

Boxing career
- Stance: Orthodox

Boxing record
- Total fights: 25
- Wins: 24
- Win by KO: 15
- Losses: 1

Tadashi Mihara (三原 正, Mihara Tadashi; born 30 March 1955) is a Japanese former professional boxer who competed as a light middleweight throughout his career.

Mihara began his boxing career when he was a third grader of the high school. He won the title of the All-Japan Amateur Boxing Championships in the light middleweight division in 1977. He also got the group title of the university league as a captain of the Nihon University boxing club. He experienced 38 matches during his amateur career; winning 28 (15 by knockout) and losing 10.

After that, as a professional, Mihara fought 25 times between 1978 and 1985; winning 24 (15 by knockout) and losing 1. He won his first title in his fifth contest as a professional, beating Jae-Keum Lim for the OPBF title, a belt that he defended six times until he returned it. In June 1981, he won via a fifth-round knockout, in the undercard of Ayub Kalule vs. Sugar Ray Leonard, at the Reliant Astrodome, Houston. Since Leonard vacated the title after this, Mihara fought against Rocky Fratto for the vacant WBA world junior middleweight title in Rochester, New York on November 7, 1981. Mihara knocked him down by his right cross in the fourth round, and won the title via a majority decision. Judge Harold Lederman scored the fight a draw. Afterwards he said of Mihara, "There's no doubt that he's got a good jaw. He really got tagged a couple of times. I thought Fratto was going to knock him out." He lost his title after suffering a knockout during his first defence, against Davey Moore at the Tokyo Metropolitan Gymnasium on February 2, 1982. His lumbago became chronic from these days. Following this loss, Mihara won the Japanese junior middleweight title and defended it six times until June 1984, then returned it. He fought for a final time in March 1985, beating Tricky Kawaguchi by a unanimous decision.

== Professional boxing record ==
25 fights	24 wins	1 loss
By knockout	15	1
By decision	9	0
By disqualification	0	0

No.	Result	Record	Opponent	Type	Round	Date	Location	Notes
25	Win	24–1	Tricky Kawaguchi	UD	10	Mar 28, 1985	Korakuen Pingpong Center, Tokyo, Japan	
24	Win	23–1	Takanobu Suzuki	KO	4 (10)	Jun 28, 1984	Korakuen Pingpong Center, Tokyo, Japan	Retained Japanese light-middleweight title
23	Win	22–1	Kei Tsukada	PTS	10	Feb 23, 1984	Korakuen Pingpong Center, Tokyo, Japan	Retained Japanese light-middleweight title
22	Win	21–1	Katsuhiro Sawada	KO	5 (12)	Nov 24, 1983	Korakuen Pingpong Center, Tokyo, Japan	Retained Japanese light-middleweight title
21	Win	20–1	Katsuyoshi Kitsumoto	PTS	10	Sep 22, 1983	Korakuen Pingpong Center, Tokyo, Japan	Retained Japanese light-middleweight title
20	Win	19–1	Yohi Arai	PTS	10	May 26, 1983	Japan	Retained Japanese light-middleweight title
19	Win	18–1	Yohi Arai	TKO	9 (10)	Feb 14, 1983	Kochi, Japan	Retained Japanese light-middleweight title
18	Win	17–1	Katsuhiro Sawada	KO	5 (10)	Nov 2, 1982	Japan	Won Japanese light-middleweight title
17	Win	16–1	Mimoun Mohatar	UD	10	May 27, 1982	Central Gymnasium, Takasaki, Japan	
16	Loss	15–1	Davey Moore	KO	6 (15)	Feb 2, 1982	Metropolitan Gym, Shibuya, Tokyo, Japan	Lost WBA light-middleweight title
15	Win	15–0	Rocky Fratto	MD	15	Nov 7, 1981	War Memorial Auditorium, Rochester, New York, U.S.	Won vacant WBA light-middleweight title
14	Win	14–0	Ramon Dionisio	KO	5 (12)	Jun 25, 1981	Astrodome, Houston, Texas, U.S.	
13	Win	13–0	Chung-Yul Lee	UD	12	Jan 23, 1981	Korakuen Pingpong Center, Tokyo, Japan	Retained OPBF light-middleweight title
12	Win	12–0	Kyung Shik Kim	KO	9 (12)	Oct 31, 1980	Japan	Retained OPBF light-middleweight title
11	Win	11–0	Michihiro Horihata	UD	12	May 30, 1980	Korakuen Pingpong Center, Tokyo, Japan	Retained OPBF light-middleweight title
10	Win	10–0	Ramon Dionisio	KO	7 (12)	Feb 23, 1980	Prefectural Gymnasium, Tokushima City, Japan	Retained OPBF light-middleweight title
9	Win	9–0	Alberto Cruz	UD	10	Jan 24, 1980	Korakuen Pingpong Center, Tokyo, Japan	
8	Win	8–0	Ho Joo	KO	3 (12)	Oct 25, 1979	Japan	Retained OPBF light-middleweight title
7	Win	7–0	Nessie Horiguchi	TKO	4 (10)	Sep 9, 1979	City Gymnasium, Takasaki, Japan	
6	Win	6–0	Armando Boniquit	KO	5 (12)	Jul 15, 1979	Korakuen Pingpong Center, Tokyo, Japan	Retained OPBF light-middleweight title
5	Win	5–0	Jae Keun Lim	KO	5 (12)	Apr 26, 1979	Japan	Won OPBF light-middleweight title
4	Win	4–0	Phil Robinson	KO	1 (10)	Feb 22, 1979	Japan	
3	Win	3–0	Tsutomu Hagusa	KO	6 (10)	Nov 23, 1978	Korakuen Hall, Bunkyo, Tokyo, Japan	
2	Win	2–0	Minoru Ono	TKO	7 (10)	Sep 28, 1978	Korakuen Hall, Bunkyo, Tokyo, Japan	
1	Win	1–0	Eiji Tanaka	KO	3 (6)	Jun 22, 1978	Korakuen Hall, Bunkyo, Tokyo, Japan	

== See also ==
- List of WBA world champions
- List of super welterweight boxing champions
- List of Japanese boxing world champions
- Boxing in Japan

Achievements
Vacant Title last held by Sugar Ray Leonard	WBA Junior Middleweight Champion; November 7, 1981–February 2, 1982	Succeeded by Davey Moore
