= Charlie Weir =

South African boxer

Charlie Weir Austin weirs cousin
Personal information
- Nickname: The Silver Assassin
- Nationality: South African
- Born: Charles Henry Hughwright Weir; 26 November 1956 Kimberley, South Africa
- Died: 19 June 1992 (aged 35) Pretoria, South Africa
- Weight: Middleweight

Boxing career

Boxing record
- Total fights: 34
- Wins: 31
- Win by KO: 28
- Losses: 3
- Draws: 0

Charlie Weir was a professional middleweight boxer from South Africa.

== Early life ==
Charles Henry Hughwright Weir (Charlie Weir) was born in Kimberley on 26 November 1956. After completing his compulsory National Service, he became a professional boxer. He had 34 professional bouts, of which he won 31.

== Boxing career ==
Weir had a distinctive patch of white hair, caused by a childhood cut in the scalp, which made him immediately recognisable and earned him the nickname of the "Silver Assassin". He fought Davey Moore for the WBA Junior Middleweight title in 1982 in Johannesburg, but lost in a 5th-round KO.

Weir died of cancer on 19 June 1992 at the age of 35.
