= Christian Larsen (boxer) =

Danish boxer (1947–2021)

Personal information
- Nationality: Danish
- Born: 12 September 1947 Aalborg, Denmark
- Died: 24 July 2021 (aged 73) Nørresundby, Denmark

Sport
- Sport: Boxing

Christian Larsen (born 12 September 1947, dead 24 July 2021) was a Danish boxer. He competed in the men's light middleweight event at the 1968 Summer Olympics.

Larsen was married to Grethe Larsen, with whom he had two daughter. He died of cancer, aged 73, in a hospice in Nørresundby on 24 July 2021.
