= László Sebők =

Hungarian boxer

Personal information
- Nationality: Hungarian
- Born: 13 November 1937; Budapest, Hungary
- Died: 29 September 2012 (aged 74); Budapest, Hungary

Sport
- Sport: Boxing

László Sebők (13 November 1937 – 29 September 2012) was a Hungarian boxer. He competed at the 1960 Summer Olympics and the 1964 Summer Olympics. At the 1964 Summer Olympics, he lost to Eddie Davies of Ghana.
