= Albert Menduni =

French boxer

Personal information
- Nationality: French
- Born: 18 September 1945 (age 81) Grenoble, France

Sport
- Sport: Boxing

Albert Menduni (born 18 September 1945) is a French boxer. He competed in the men's light middleweight event at the 1968 Summer Olympics.
