= Davey Moore (boxer, born 1959) =

American boxer (1959–1988)

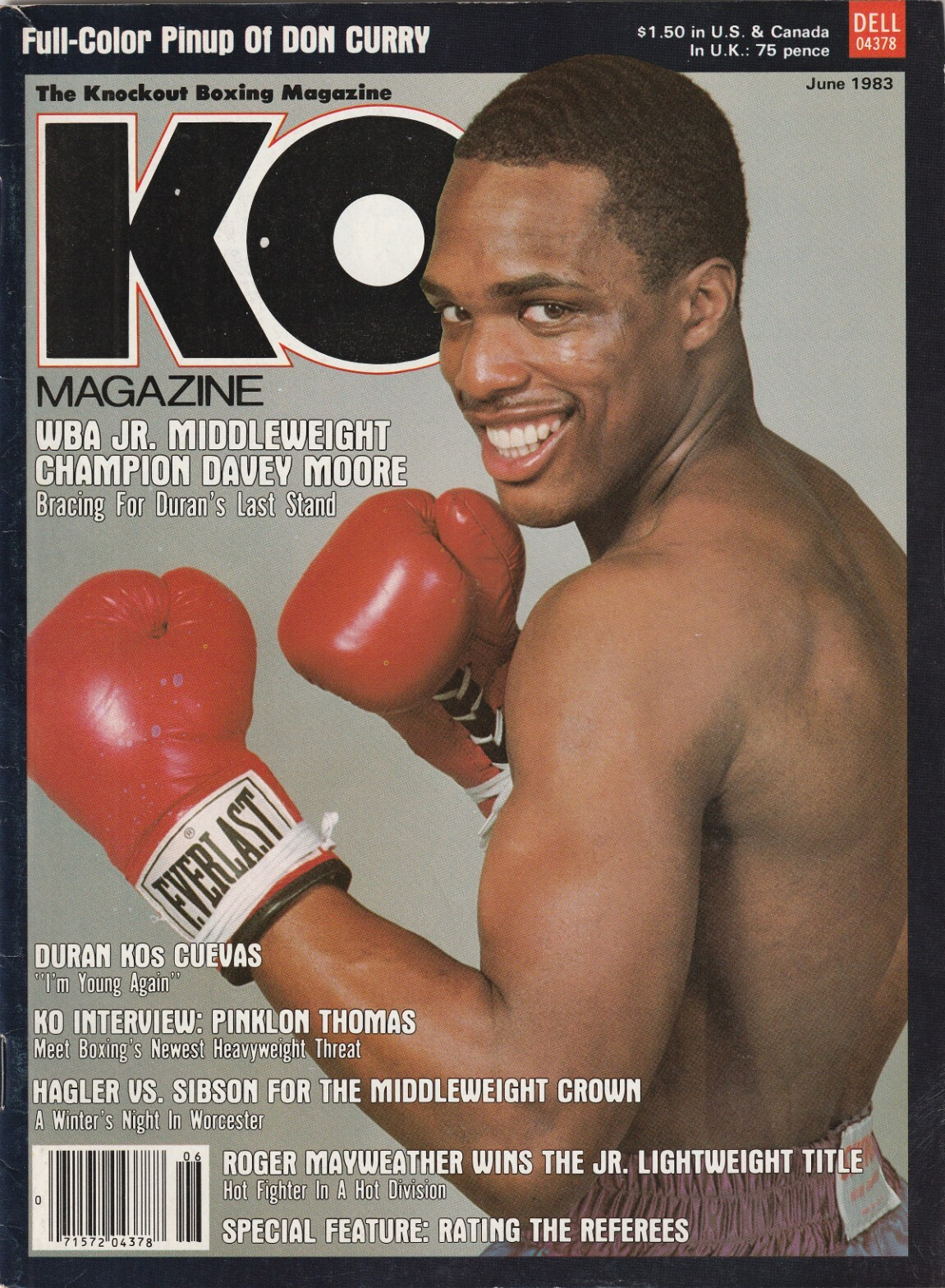
- Moore on the cover of an issue of KO Magazine, cover dated June 1983

Personal information
- Nickname: Sensational
- Born: Davey Moore; June 9, 1959 Bronx, New York, U.S.
- Died: June 3, 1988 (aged 28) Holmdel, New Jersey, U.S.
- Height: 5 ft 10 in (1.78 m)
- Weight: Light middleweight

Boxing career
- Reach: 71 in (180 cm)
- Stance: Orthodox

Boxing record
- Total fights: 23
- Wins: 18
- Win by KO: 14
- Losses: 5

Davey Moore (June 9, 1959 – June 3, 1988) was an American professional boxer who competed from 1980 to 1988. He held the World Boxing Association (WBA) light middleweight title from 1982 to 1983. He is the second of two professional champions who shared the name in the second half of the 20th century. Each died around the age of thirty, the first, Davey S. Moore, as a result of punishment in a fight, the second in an accident at his home.

The latter was born in New York during the championship reign of the first. As a boxer, he rose quickly through the light middleweight ranks—perhaps too quickly, according to some boxing writers and critics.

== Notable amateur fights ==
Davey Moore won four New York Golden Gloves Championships. Moore won the 1976 135 lb Sub-Novice Championship. Moore also won the 1977, 1978 and 1979 147 lb Open Championships. He was defeated in the 1980 147 lb Open division by Pedro Vilella who was a three time New York Golden Gloves Champion. Moore was trained at the Morrisania Youth Center in the Bronx, New York by Leon Washington, a former professional Middleweight.

== Professional career ==
Moore earned a spot on the 1980 US Olympic Team, but did not compete due to the US boycott of the Moscow Olympics.

One of Moore's early wins was in June 1981 over Kevin Rooney, who would later train Mike Tyson. Moore entered the fight with a 6–0 record, while Rooney was 15–0. Moore won by a TKO in the seventh round of an eight-round fight.

After winning eight professional fights, five by knockout, the WBA named him their No.10 challenger, and in February 1982, he traveled to Japan, where he knocked out defending champion Tadashi Mihara in six, winning the WBA world junior middleweight title.

In April 1982 he defended his world title against Charlie Weir in Johannesburg, South Africa, taking five rounds to knock him out. Then in July 1982 he fought former world champion Ayub Kalule, whom he stopped in the tenth round in Moore's second title defense.

Moore started 1983 by beating challenger Gary Guiden, by knockout in the fourth round. He had been scheduled to fight Tony Ayala Jr., but Ayala was convicted of burglary and rape and sentenced to 35 years in prison. Next, Moore defended against former two-division world champion Roberto Durán. Moore appeared to be overconfident against an aging 'Hands of Stone' Duran but Duran totally outclassed him and dished out vicious punishment, hammering shut one of Moore's eyes and stopping him in eight brutal rounds at Madison Square Garden. The beating was so one-sided that Moore's mother and girlfriend were both said to have fainted at ringside. Many knowledgeable observers believed that referee Ernesto Magana should have stopped the fight far earlier. This was proven to be correct by the fact that Moore was never the same fighter after this contest. In 1992, Colombo crime family Caporegime Michael Franzese testified that Moore was handled by himself and other Colombo mobsters, and that although they knew that Moore was in poor physical condition because he had undergone oral surgery just 2 days before the fight, they decided to proceed with the fight due to the profitability of betting on Duran. Franzese believed that bribery may have taken place for Moore to pass the physical examination.

Moore won his next two fights, the second in Monte Carlo over Wilfred Benítez but then he was disqualified in the ninth round against Louis Acaries in Paris. In 1985, he won one more fight and was in line to challenge Carlos Santos for the IBF World Junior Middleweight title. That fight did not materialize, but eventually he did get to challenge for the IBF title against Buster Drayton in August 1986. Moore lost by TKO in the tenth round and only fought 5 more times, winning 3 and losing 2.

== Professional boxing record ==
| 23 fights | 18 wins | 5 losses |
|---|---|---|
| By knockout | 14 | 3 |
| By decision | 4 | 1 |
| By disqualification | 0 | 1 |

| No. | Result | Record | Opponent | Type | Round | Date | Location | Notes |
|---|---|---|---|---|---|---|---|---|
| 23 | Win | 18–5 | Gary Coates | TKO | 6 (10) | Apr 30, 1988 | Staten Island, New York City, New York, U.S. | |
| 22 | Win | 17–5 | Hector Rosario | TKO | 4 (10) | Mar 18, 1988 | Meadowlands Sheraton, East Rutherford, New Jersey, U.S. | |
| 21 | Loss | 16–5 | John David Jackson | UD | 10 | Jul 21, 1987 | Resorts International, Atlantic City, New Jersey, U.S. | |
| 20 | Loss | 16–4 | Lupe Aquino | TKO | 5 (10) | Apr 6, 1987 | Caesars Palace, Outdoor Arena, Las Vegas, Nevada, U.S. | |
| 19 | Win | 16–3 | Cecil Pettigrew | UD | 10 | Mar 11, 1987 | Resorts International, Atlantic City, New Jersey, U.S. | |
| 18 | Loss | 15–3 | Buster Drayton | TKO | 10 (15) | Aug 24, 1986 | La Pinede, Juan-les-Pins, France | For IBF light middleweight title |
| 17 | Win | 15–2 | Victor Claudio | TKO | 2 (10) | Apr 4, 1986 | Caesars Hotel & Casino, Atlantic City, New Jersey, U.S. | |
| 16 | Loss | 14–2 | Louis Acariès | DQ | 9 (12) | Dec 10, 1984 | Palais Omnisport de Paris-Bercy, Paris, France | Moore disqualified for landing a punch after the bell to end round 9 |
| 15 | Win | 14–1 | Wilfred Benítez | TKO | 2 (10) | Jul 14, 1984 | Stade Louis II, Fontvieille, Monaco | |
| 14 | Win | 13–1 | Monte Oswald | KO | 3 (10) | Mar 14, 1984 | Resorts International, Atlantic City, New Jersey, U.S. | |
| 13 | Loss | 12–1 | Roberto Durán | TKO | 8 (15) | Jun 16, 1983 | Madison Square Garden, New York City, New York, U.S. | Lost WBA light middleweight title |
| 12 | Win | 12–0 | Gary Guiden | KO | 4 (15) | Jan 29, 1983 | Ballys Park Place Hotel Casino, Atlantic City, New Jersey, U.S. | Retained WBA light middleweight title |
| 11 | Win | 11–0 | Ayub Kalule | TKO | 10 (15) | Jul 17, 1982 | Ballys Park Place Hotel Casino, Atlantic City, New Jersey, U.S. | Retained WBA light middleweight title |
| 10 | Win | 10–0 | Charlie Weir | KO | 5 (15) | Apr 26, 1982 | Ellis Park Stadium, Johannesburg, South Africa | Retained WBA light middleweight title |
| 9 | Win | 9–0 | Tadashi Mihara | KO | 6 (15) | Feb 2, 1982 | Metropolitan Gym, Japan | Won WBA light middleweight title |
| 8 | Win | 8–0 | Mike Herron | TKO | 7 (8) | Oct 31, 1981 | Sands Casino Hotel, Atlantic City, New Jersey, U.S. | |
| 7 | Win | 7–0 | Kevin Rooney | TKO | 7 (8) | Jun 1, 1981 | Playboy Hotel & Casino, Atlantic City, New Jersey, U.S. | |
| 6 | Win | 6–0 | Joseph Nsubuga | TKO | 1 (6) | May 23, 1981 | Teatro Ariston, San Remo, Italy | |
| 5 | Win | 5–0 | Tony Suero | TKO | 4 (6) | Mar 28, 1981 | Carrier Dome, Syracuse, New York, U.S. | |
| 4 | Win | 4–0 | Jeff Passero | TKO | 3 (6) | Feb 8, 1981 | Great Gorge Playboy Club, McAfee, New Jersey, U.S. | |
| 3 | Win | 3–0 | Felix Nance | UD | 6 | Jan 17, 1981 | Boston Garden, Boston, Massachusetts, U.S. | |
| 2 | Win | 2–0 | Teddy White | PTS | 6 | Dec 20, 1980 | Kingsbridge Armory, Bronx, New York City, New York, U.S. | |
| 1 | Win | 1–0 | Jesus Saucedo | PTS | 6 | Nov 1, 1980 | Caesars Tahoe, Stateline, Nevada, U.S. | |

== Death ==
Moore was killed at his home in Holmdel, New Jersey, one evening in early June 1988 when his four-wheel drive vehicle began to roll down the driveway. Caught off guard, he attempted to stop it but was dragged under and pinned. Paramedics arrived to find him lifeless, the official cause of death being blunt traumatic asphyxia. He left behind his wife Dria and their children Dira and David Moore Jr. AKA Broseroyce

== See also ==
- List of world light-middleweight boxing champions
- Anton Yelchin, an American actor who died in a similar manner to the subject of this article

Sporting positions
World boxing titles
| Preceded by Tadashi Mihara | WBA super welterweight champion February 2, 1982 – June 16, 1983 | Succeeded by Roberto Durán |
Status
| Preceded by Netrnoi Sor Vorasingh | Latest born world champion to die June 3, 1988 – June 27, 1990 | Succeeded by Gilberto Román |
