= Rocky Mosley Jr =

American boxer

Rocky Mosley Jr.
Personal information
- Nationality: American
- Born: Roxell Mosley Jr. March 3, 1956 (age 70) Riverside, California
- Height: 5 ft 11 in (180 cm)
- Weight: Light middleweight

Boxing career
- Reach: 75 in (191 cm)
- Stance: Orthodox

Boxing record
- Total fights: 42
- Wins: 33
- Win by KO: 13
- Losses: 8
- Draws: 1

Rocky Mosley Jr. (born Roxell Mosley Jr., March 3, 1956 in Riverside, California) is a retired American professional boxer who fought out of Las Vegas, Nevada. Mosley was the NABF and USBA Junior Middleweight Champion. At his peak Mosley was ranked as the No. 4 Junior Middleweight in the world by the Ring magazine in 1981, until he lost his North American Championship to Rocky Fratto. Mosley's biggest wins were a knockout over former Olympic Bronze medalist Johnny Baldwin and a split-decision over Larry Bonds. Baldwin's only loss at the time was a 10 round decision loss to Marvelous Marvin Hagler.

Rocky Mosley was managed by professional poker player Billy Baxter. His trainer was the legendary Eddie Futch.
