= Walter Campos =

Costa Rican boxer

Personal information
- Born: 4 April 1951 San José, Costa Rica
- Died: 18 May 2015 (aged 64)

Sport
- Sport: Boxing

Walter Campos (4 April 1951-18 May 2015) was a Costa Rican boxer. He competed in the men's light middleweight event at the 1968 Summer Olympics where he lost in the first round.
