= Alhassan Brimah =

Ghanaian boxer

Personal information
- Nationality: Ghanaian
- Born: 9 November 1937 (age 87); Accra, Ghana

Sport
- Sport: Boxing

Alhassan Brimah (born 9 November 1937) is a Ghanaian boxer. He competed in the men's light middleweight event at the 1960 Summer Olympics. At the 1960 Summer Olympics, he lost by knockout to Boris Lagutin of the Soviet Union in the Round of 16.
