= John Baldwin (boxer) =

American boxer

Personal information
- Nickname: "The Mad" Baldwin
- Born: John Lee Baldwin; August 26, 1949 (age 77) Detroit, U.S.

Boxing career
Medal record
Men's Boxing
Representing United States
Olympic Games
Bronze medal – third place	1968 Mexico City	Light Middleweight

John Lee "Johnny" Baldwin (born August 26, 1949 in Detroit) is an American boxer who competed in the Light Middleweight (71 kg) category. He won an Olympic bronze medal in 1968.

== Pro career ==
Known as "The Mad" Baldwin, he turned pro in 1970 and lost a decision to Marvin Hagler in 1975. In 1977 he took on Rocky Mosley Jr in the ill-fated U.S. Championship Tournament, but lost via K.O. In 1978 he lost a decision to Marvin Johnson, and retired a year later.

== Professional boxing record ==
32 Wins (22 knockouts, 10 decisions), 5 Losses (2 knockouts, 3 decisions), 1 No Contest
Result	Record	Opponent	Type	Round	Date	Location	Notes
Loss	8-4	(Mexico) David "Maceton" Cabrera	KO	3	1979-01-16	Houston, Texas, United States	
Loss	19-1	(United States) Marvin Johnson	UD	10	1978-05-24	Spectrum, Philadelphia, Pennsylvania, United States	
Loss	17-0	(Uganda) Ayub Kalule	PTS	10	1978-03-02	Vejle, Denmark	
Win	22-8-1	(United States) Mario Rosa	KO	6	1978-02-16	Houston, Texas, United States	
Win	9-7	(United States) Johnny Townsend	PTS	10	1977-12-08	Silver Slipper, Las Vegas, Nevada, United States	
Win	3-5	(United States) Efrain Gonzalez	KO	1	1977-12-01	Houston, Texas, United States	
Loss	15-0	(United States) Rocky Mosley Jr	TKO	4	1977-03-06	Prison, Marion, Ohio, United States	Referee stopped the bout at 2:30 of the fourth round.
Loss	24-0-1	(United States) Marvin Hagler	UD	10	1975-12-20	Hynes Convention Center, Boston, Massachusetts, United States	
Win	2-6	(United States) Charles "Captain" Cook	KO	2	1975-09-23	Houston, Texas, United States	
Win	6-2	(United States) Lamont Lovelady	UD	10	1975-04-11	Baltimore, Maryland, United States	
Win	4-18	(United States) Sylvester Wilder	KO	6	1974-11-21	Highland Park, Michigan, United States	
Win	--	(United States) Don Meloncon	KO	1	1974-05-21	Houston, Texas, United States	
Win	19-11	(United States) Roy Dale	PTS	10	1972-11-28	Houston, Texas, United States	
No Contest	19-24-2	(United States) Bobby "Songbird" Williams	NC	5	1972-10-31	Beaumont, Texas, United States	
Win	39-41-7	(United States) Charley "Bad News" Austin	KO	4	1972-10-10	Beaumont, Texas, United States	
Win	58-16-6	(Canada) Ron Wilson	UD	10	1972-08-15	Houston, Texas, United States	
Win	6-3	(United States) Wilson "Red" Lacaze	SD	10	1972-07-17	Municipal Auditorium, New Orleans, Louisiana, United States	
Win	19-9	(United States) Jimmy Rossette	PTS	10	1972-05-17	San Diego, California, United States	
Win	51-80-16	(United States) Billy "Boggy" Marsh	PTS	10	1972-05-02	Houston, Texas, United States	
Win	1-1	(United States) James Brannon	TKO	2	1972-03-07	Beaumont, Texas, United States	
Win	2-13	(United States) Elgie Walters	KO	4	1972-02-29	Austin, Texas, United States	
Win	41-15-4	(Mexico) Jorge Rosales	PTS	10	1972-02-22	San Antonio, Texas, United States	
Win	7-18	(United States) Bruce "The Truce" Scott	KO	5	1971-11-16	Beaumont, Texas, United States	
Win	9-4	(United States) Alfonso Aguirre	KO	5	1971-10-19	Houston, Texas, United States	
Win	32-9-1	(United States) Willie "Sweetwater" Warren	UD	10	1971-08-31	Beaumont, Texas, United States	Texas Middleweight Title.
Win	7-7	(Trinidad and Tobago) David Beckles	KO	1	1971-07-14	Houston, Texas, United States	
Win	32-23	(United States) Nat "Killer" Jackson	TKO	5	1971-06-15	Sam Houston Coliseum, Houston, Texas, United States	
Win	3-13	(United States) Frank "The Tank" Evans	KO	3	1971-03-16	Beaumont, Texas, United States	
Win	14-6	(United States) Don Cobbs	UD	10	1970-11-30	New Orleans, Louisiana, United States	
Win	5-11	(United States) Bruce "The Truce" Scott	KO	3	1970-08-31	Beaumont, Texas, United States	
Win	5-4-1	(United States) Norbert Cody	KO	5	1970-08-24	Municipal Auditorium, New Orleans, Louisiana, United States	
Win	15-17-2	(United States) Bobby "Songbird" Williams	TKO	4	1970-08-04	Houston, Texas, United States	
Win	5-15	(United States) Freddie Calloway	KO	2	1970-07-21	Sam Houston Coliseum, Houston, Texas, United States	
Win	6-19	(United States) Johnny "All-Pro" Armstrong	KO	1	1970-07-08	Victoria, Texas, United States	
Win	5-1	(United States) Adam "Kid Fast Quick" Moore	KO	1	1970-06-22	New Orleans, Louisiana, United States	Moore knocked out at 2:55 of the first round.
Win	4-10	(United States) Bruce "The Truce" Scott	KO	1	1970-06-16	Houston, Texas, United States	
Win	3-10-1	(United States) "Uncle" Sam Wilson	KO	1	1970-05-11	New Orleans, Louisiana, United States	Wilson knocked out at 2:20 of the first round.
Win	1-11-1	(United States) George Seale	KO	1	1970-03-03	Sam Houston Coliseum, Houston, Texas, United States	
