= John Elliott (Jamaican boxer) =

Jamaican boxer (1931–2015)

Personal information
- Born: 8 June 1931; Kingston, Colony of Jamaica, British Empire
- Died: 30 March 2015 (aged 83); Telford, England

Sport
- Sport: Boxing

John Elliott (8 June 1931 – 30 March 2015) was a Jamaican boxer. He competed in the men's light middleweight event at the 1964 Summer Olympics.
