= Vasile Mirza =

Romanian boxer

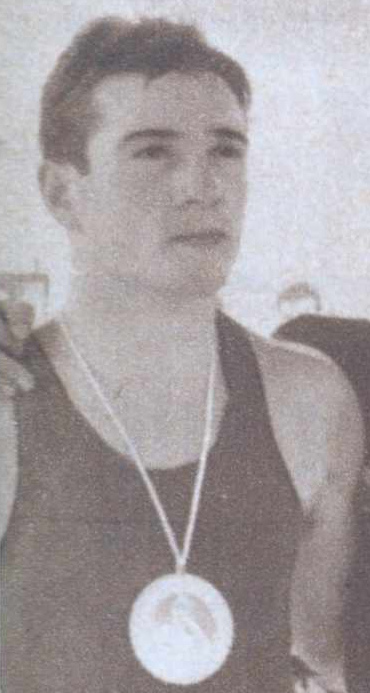

Personal information
- Nationality: Romanian
- Born: 26 July 1943 (age 81); Cluj-Napoca, Romania

Sport
- Sport: Boxing

Vasile Mirza (born 26 July 1943) is a Romanian boxer. He competed in the men's light middleweight event at the 1964 Summer Olympics.
