= Paul Hogh =

German boxer

Personal information
- Nationality: German
- Born: 1 August 1933 (age 91); Horná Štubňa, Czechoslovakia

Sport
- Sport: Boxing

Paul Hogh (born 1 August 1933) is a German boxer. He competed in the men's light middleweight event at the 1964 Summer Olympics.
