= Joseph C. Fratto Jr. =

American judge

- Born: September 28, 1949; Salt Lake City, Utah
- Occupation: Utah Third Judicial District court judge
- Children: Three daughters

Joseph C. Fratto Jr. presided as a Utah Third Judicial District court judge for Salt Lake County. He was appointed to the bench in 1997 by Utah Governor Michael O. Leavitt.

== Early life and education ==
Fratto was born on September 28, 1949, in Salt Lake City, Utah. After graduating from South High School, Fratto attended the University of Utah where he received a Bachelor of Arts degree. Fratto received his Juris Doctor degree from the University of Utah College of Law in 1975. In addition to his legal practice Fratto has taught in the paralegal programs at both Westminster College and Salt Lake Community College.

== Career ==
Following his graduation from law school, Fratto joined the Salt Lake Legal Defenders Association where he was a staff attorney until 1979. He thereafter worked as a private practitioner with his father in the firm of Fratto and Fratto, handling both civil and criminal cases.

Fratto was appointed to the bench in 1997 by then Governor Michael O. Leavitt. Fratto was retained in Utah's judicial retention elections, including his last such election in 2009. Fratto retired from the bench in December 2011.

== Notable cases ==
Fratto has presided over several high-profile cases. One of the cases which received extensive media coverage involved a 12-year-old Utah boy, Parker Jensen, who was diagnosed with a rare form of cancer. His parents, who did not believe he had cancer, refused to provide him with the medically recommended chemotherapy treatment, leading to a medical neglect complaint being filed against the parents by the State and a state effort to force the treatment. The parents filed lawsuits in both Utah state and federal courts, arguing that their federal and state constitutional rights as parents were being violated by the State of Utah. A Utah federal court Judge dismissed the federal lawsuit in 2008 holding that the state's actions did not violate the U.S. Constitution. In 2009, Judge Fratto dismissed the state lawsuit, holding that the Utah Constitution similarly does not provide any different rights than under federal law. Both dismissals were appealed. In May 2010, the Tenth Circuit Court of Appeals upheld the dismissal of the federal lawsuit. In May 2010, the Utah Supreme Court heard arguments on the state appeal, and in March 2011 dismissed the Jensen's case at the state level.

== Personal life ==
Fratto is the father to three daughters.
