= Georgia Experiment =

Policy prohibiting Black slavery in colonial Georgia

The Georgia Experiment was the policy of banning the introduction of Black slavery to the Province of Georgia, one of the Thirteen Colonies of British America. Georgia had been founded in 1732 as a proprietary colony by General James Oglethorpe, who envisioned the new colony as a haven for debtors and reformed prisoners from England. At the urging of Oglethorpe and the Georgia Trustees, the Parliament of Great Britain banned the introduction of Black slavery to the colony in 1735. The ban remained in effect until 1751, when the diminution of the Spanish threat and economic pressure from Georgia's emergent planter class forced Parliament to reverse itself.

== Background ==
Having envisioned the Georgia colony as a haven for debtors and reformed prisoners, Oglethorpe was uncomfortable with the prospect of Georgians attaining immense wealth and coalescing into a planter aristocracy (akin to that across the border in South Carolina) through the exploitation of slave labor. Oglethorpe shared his preference for an austere ethic of hard work with his fellow trustees of the colony, who believed that their preeminent social goal – moral reform through individual economic autonomy – would be undermined by the introduction of slavery.

The ban on slavery had practical military implications as well. During the mid 18th century, the Spanish maintained a foothold in North America through their colonial presence in Florida, which bordered Georgia to the south. London envisioned Georgia as a buffer colony to stem Spanish expansion in the Southeast and protect the more profitable colonies to the north.

The Spanish tactic of recruiting American slaves to military service in exchange for their emancipation buoyed Oglethorpe's experiment by providing a strategic incentive to minimize the slave presence in Georgia.

== Implementation ==
Believing that the anticipated agricultural output of Georgia – mostly low-labor intensity products such as silk – would lend itself better to small-scale farming by white Europeans, the trustees expected the early colonists to embrace their vision of the colony free of slave labor. Yet Oglethorpe underestimated the colonists' disinclination toward the intensive labor requisite for agricultural output, especially by comparison to their much wealthier and far more leisurely counterparts in South Carolina. In addition, in the interest of furthering their holdings into Georgia’s plentiful farmland, some South Carolinian plantation owners lobbied Georgians to flout the trustees' wishes.

Sensing that he could not hold the ban in place through sheer force of will, Oglethorpe sought and received Parliamentary backing when the House of Commons passed legislation codifying the prohibition on slavery in Georgia in 1735.

== Resistance ==
The fiercest opponents of the Georgia Experiment were a group known as the Malcontents, led by Patrick Tailfer and Thomas Stephens. Unlike those rescued from the English debtors' prison for the colonial proprietors, the Malcontents were overwhelmingly Scottish and received no financial assistance from the trustees to aid their relocation to Georgia. Stephens and Tailfer organized numerous publications and letter-writing campaigns, the most prominent of which netted some 121 signatures in 1738. When Oglethorpe and the trustees proved recalcitrant in the face of this public pressure, the Malcontents lobbied the House of Commons directly, including junkets by the leadership to London. However, Parliament was unmoved by their arguments so long as Spain remained a military threat to the British colonies.

== Repeal ==
In 1742, Oglethorpe won a resounding victory over the Spanish in the Battle of Bloody Marsh, effectively ending Spanish expansionism in North America. It was Oglethorpe's greatest military victory that sealed the fate of his prized Georgia Experiment, as the removal of the Spanish threats substantially decreased incentive for the House of Commons to continue the increasingly unpopular ban on slavery. By 1750, the trustees acquiesced to Georgia's demand for slave labor and in that year Parliament revised the act of 1735 to allow slavery as of January 1, 1751.

== Aftermath ==
Once the Georgia experiment was formally abandoned, the colony quickly caught up to the regional neighbors in the acquisition of slaves. A decade after the repeal, Georgia boasted one slave for every two free persons, and slaves made up about one-half of the colony's population on the eve of the American Revolution. By virtue of increased production of staple products (particularly rice and indigo) as a result of the importation of slave labor, Georgia had the economic luxury to support a dramatically growing population: between 1751 and 1776, the colony's population increased more than tenfold, to a total of about 33,000 (including 15,000 slaves).

However, not all white Georgians were unambiguous beneficiaries. Low-skilled white labor and white artisans commanded drastically reduced wages due to the competition of slave labor. The growing chasm between the ascendant planter class and a large contingent of small farmers, independent artisans, and unskilled white laborers sharply factionalized the colony both before and during the Revolutionary War. Georgia's lackluster performance in the war effort has been linked to the uncertain leadership of this comparatively new and rootless aristocracy.

== Notes ==
=== References ===
- Bartley, Numan V. (1983). The Creation of Modern Georgia. Athens, GA: The University of Georgia Press. ISBN 0820306681.
- Brevard, Caroline Mays; Bennett, Henry Eastman (1904). A History of Florida. Cincinnati, OH: American Book Company.
- Brooks, Robert Preston (1972). History of Georgia. Boston, MA: Atkinson, Mentzer, and Co.
- Davis, Harold E. (1976). The Fledgling Province: Social and Cultural Life in Colonial Georgia, 1733–1776. Chapel Hill, NC: University of North Carolina Press.
- Gray, Ralph; Wood, Betty (1976). "The transition from indentured to involuntary servitude in colonial Georgia". Explorations in Economic History. 13 (4): 353–370. doi:10.1016/0014-4983(76)90013-9.
- Wood, Betty (1984). Slavery in Colonial Georgia (1730–1755). Athens, GA: The University of Georgia Press.
