= Joseph Gonzales (boxer) =

French boxer (born 1941)

Medal record

Men's Boxing

Representing France

Olympic Games
Silver medal – second place	1964 Tokyo	Light-middleweight

Joseph Gonzales (born 6 August 1941) is a boxer from France.

He competed for France in the 1964 Summer Olympics held in Tokyo, Japan, in the light-middleweight event where he finished in second place.

== 1964 Olympic boxing results ==
Below are Joseph Gonzales's results from the 1964 Olympic boxing tournament in Tokyo where he competed in the light middleweight division:

- Round of 32: bye
- Round of 16: Defeated Koji Masuda (Japan) by a 3-2 decision
- Quarterfinal: Defeated Anthony Barber (Australia); referee stopped contest
- Semifinal: Defeated Najim Masyegun (Nigeria) by decision 3-2
- Final: Lost to Boris Lagutin (Soviet Union) by a 1-4 decision (was awarded silver medal)
