= Ion Covaci =

Romanian boxer

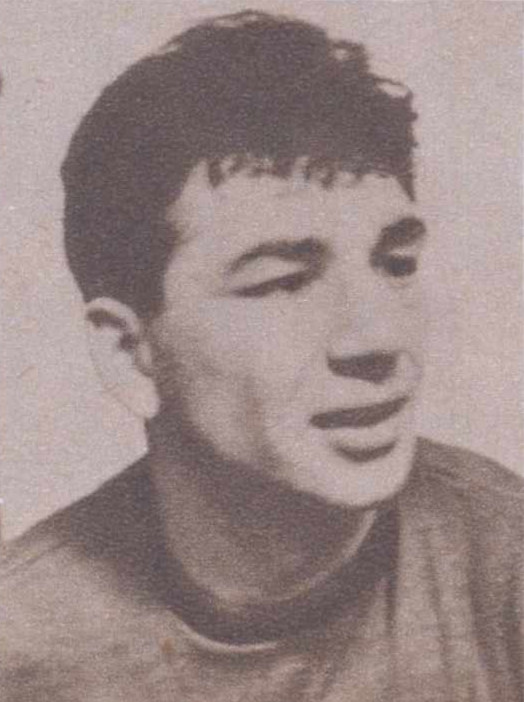

Personal information
- Nationality: Romanian
- Born: 19 April 1945 Brăila, Romania
- Died: 14 November 1973 (aged 28) Brăila, Romania

Sport
- Sport: Boxing
Medal record
Representing Romania
Romania National Amateur Boxing Championships
Silver medal – second place	1964 Bucharest	-67 kg
Gold medal – first place	1966 Bucharest	-71 kg
Gold medal – first place	1967 Bucharest	-71 kg
Gold medal – first place	1968 Bucharest	-71 kg
Silver medal – second place	1969 Bucharest	-71 kg
Gold medal – first place	1970 Bucharest	-71 kg
Silver medal – second place	1971 Bucharest	-71 kg
European Amateur Championships
Bronze medal – third place	1969 Bucharest	-71 kg

Ion Covaci (19 April 1945 – 14 November 1973), was a Romanian boxer. He competed in the men's light middleweight event at the 1968 Summer Olympics. Covaci also won four national senior titles.

== Death ==
After he ended his boxing career, Covaci became a militia officer in his native city, Brăila. On 14 November 1973 while patrolling in the city, he saw a 23-year-old man named Mihai Ion who he fought seemed suspicious. Covaci asked him to present his ID but Ion refused. Covaci decided to take him to the Miliția station. While walking near a crowded bus station, Ion pulled out a dagger from his jacket and stabbed Covaci's neck with it, killing him. Ion ran away, but was caught two days later in Galați, being sentenced to 25 years in prison.
