= Rainer Salzburger =

Austrian boxer

Personal information
- Nationality: Austrian
- Born: 21 October 1944 (age 82) Kramsach, Austria

Sport
- Sport: Boxing

Rainer Salzburger (born 21 October 1944) is an Austrian boxer. He competed in the men's light middleweight event at the 1968 Summer Olympics. At the 1968 Summer Olympics, he lost to David Jackson of Uganda.
