= Tolman Gibson =

American boxer

Personal information
- Nickname: Toby Gibson
- Born: April 17, 1942 Idabel, Oklahoma, United States
- Died: 24 March 1993 (aged 50) Oakland, California, United States

Sport
- Sport: Boxing

Tolman "Toby" Gibson (April 17, 1942 – March 24, 1993) was an American boxer. He competed in the men's light middleweight event at the 1964 Summer Olympics.

== 1964 Olympic results ==
Below is the record of Tolman Gibson, an American light middleweight boxer who competed at the 1964 Tokyo Olympics:

- Round of 32: defeated Yot Sangthien (Thailand) referee stopped contest
- Round of 16: lost to Eddie Davies (Ghana) by decision, 0-5
