= Aldo Bentini =

Italian boxer (born 1948)

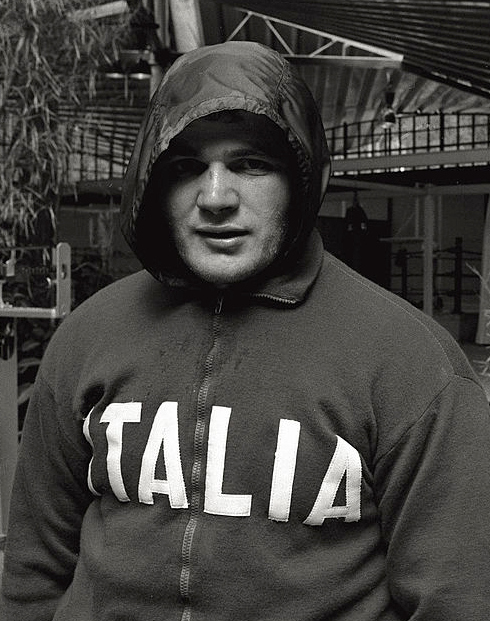

Personal information
- Nationality: Italy
- Born: 23 November 1948 (age 77) Cisterna di Latina, Italy
- Height: 1.72 m (5 ft 8 in)
- Weight: Lightweight

Boxing career

Boxing record
- Total fights: 30
- Wins: 19
- Win by KO: 1
- Losses: 6
- Draws: 3

Aldo Bentini (born 23 November 1948) is an Italian retired boxer. He competed at the 1968 Olympics but was eliminated in the second round. He turned professional and won a national super welterweight title in 1973. He lost it in 1974 and retired after unsuccessful attempts to regain it in 1977.
