= Eric Blake =

British boxer

Personal information
- Nationality: British
- Born: 30 August 1946 (age 79) Epsom, England

Sport
- Sport: Boxing

Eric John Blake (born 30 August 1946) is a former British boxer. He competed in the men's light middleweight event at the 1968 Summer Olympics.

Blake won the 1968 Amateur Boxing Association British light-middleweight title, when boxing out of the Battersea ABC.

Regional boxing titles
Preceded by Howard Sharpe	British southern area middleweight champion 10 December 1970 – 10 April 1972	Succeeded by Kevin Finnegan
