= Rocky Fratto =

American boxer

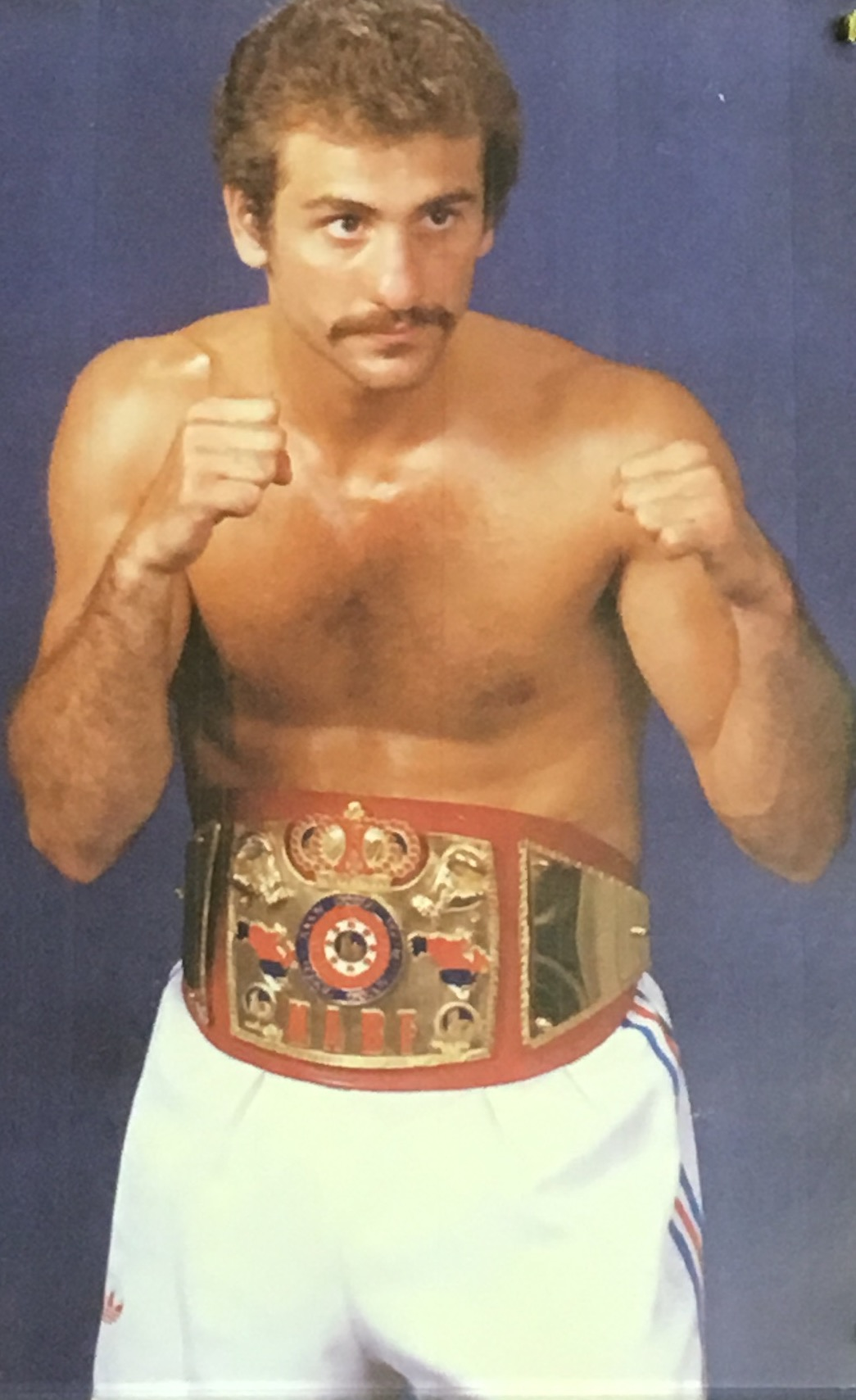
- Fratto wearing NABF belt in 1981

Personal information
- Nickname: The Pride of Geneva
- Born: Ralph Vincent Fratto; October 29, 1958 (age 67) Geneva, New York
- Height: 5 ft 9 in (175 cm)
- Weight: Light middleweight

Boxing career
- Reach: 73 in (185 cm)
- Stance: Orthodox

Boxing record
- Total fights: 32
- Wins: 28
- Win by KO: 9
- Losses: 4

Ralph "Rocky" Fratto (born October 29, 1958), "The Pride of Geneva", is an American former professional boxer from Geneva, New York. Fratto was rated as the No. 1 Junior Middleweight in the United States by the USBA, and the second best Junior Middleweight in the world by the WBA. On April 25, 1981, Fratto became the North American Champion when he won the NABF Super Welterweight title, by defeating Rocky Mosley Jr. in Rochester, New York. Mosley was rated as the 4th best Junior Middleweight in the world by Ring Magazine prior to the fight. Ring Magazine crowned Fratto as the U.S. Junior Middleweight Champion in 1981 and 1982. Fratto is a member of the New York State Boxing Hall of Fame.

== Early life ==
Fratto was the first of three children born to Ralph and Concetta Fratto in Geneva, New York. His father Ralph Fratto Sr. was born in Taverna, Calabria, Italy, in 1936, emigrating to the United States in 1948. Ralph Sr. was a local boxing coach and would bring his son along to watch the fights. On June 11, 1971, the Geneva Boxing Team had lost every fight and the young Fratto begged his father to let him in the ring. His father said his son would have to learn a lesson the "hard way." Rocky Fratto would win his first fight that night, and receive a trophy for the "fighter of the night." This was the start of his boxing career at the age of 12.

== Amateur career ==
Rocky Fratto had an amateur record of 73 wins, 3 losses and 28 knockouts. Fratto won the New York State Golden Gloves Championship in 1973 at age 14 and the New York State AAU Championship in 1974 and 1975.

At the age of 17, in November 1975, Fratto enlisted in the United States Army. In 1976 Fratto won the US All-Army Championship in the Middleweight division. When Rocky won the All-Army crown, the Army Times called it the "biggest upset of the tourney and the best fought final." Fratto defeated Navy champion and future National Champion James Rayford in the first round of the Armed Services Championships in 1976 (Rayford also defeated 1976 Olympian Chuck Walker in 1976). He went on to defeat the US Air Force champion and Olympic Team alternate Henry Bunch, to become the US Armed Forces Interservice Champion. This title qualified Fratto for the 1976 US Olympic Boxing Trials. Army Boxing Coach Sergeant Brown said of Fratto "He came right in here and handled these guys. It's unusual for someone to just walk in and beat the fighters we have in the service. In fact, I don't think it has ever been done before. We usually recruit our boxers." Fratto was honorably discharged from the Army in 1976.

== Professional career ==
Fratto turned pro in November, 1976 and reeled off 24 straight wins without a loss. In 1979 Fratto was called in to be a sparring partner for Marvelous Marvin Hagler in preparation for his first middleweight world title fight with Vito Antuofermo. Hagler's team said they were "impressed with Fratto's style and boxing ability." Veteran referee and boxing judge Jay Edson witnessed some sparring sessions between Fratto and Hagler, calling them "real wars," and stated that "Everyone watching was amazed at this unknown kid from Geneva, who was matching Hagler shot for shot."

Fratto was scheduled to face WBA Super Welterweight world champion Ayub Kalule in Copenhagen, Denmark on September 6, 1980. However, the fight was pushed back as Kalule was obligated to defend his title against his mandatory challenger, Bushy Bester. Fratto traveled to Denmark to watch the fight. While abroad Fratto met with boxing promoter Mickey Duff about a possible title fight with WBC champion Maurice Hope. During the interim, Sugar Ray Leonard challenged Kalule and the Fratto fight fell through, after Leonard's camp was able to come up with a better offer.

By April 1981 Fratto was fighting for the North American Boxing Championship. He defeated Rocky Mosley Jr. to win the NABF strap on April 25, 1981. After this victory Fratto was rated the number two Super Welterweight in the world.

=== World title fight ===
Sugar Ray Leonard vacated his WBA Super Welterweight world title after beating Thomas Hearns for the WBA Welterweight world title in September 1981. This fight set the stage for Fratto to face Tadashi Mihara, who was the number one rated Super Welterweight by the WBA.

The fight would take place in Rochester, New York on November 7, 1981. This would be the first World Title fight ever held in Rochester, New York. The fight went the full 15 rounds and Fratto lost a one-point majority decision. Two judges scored for Mihara and Harold Lederman scored it 142-142, a draw.

=== Retirement and comeback ===
Fratto retired in 1982 to start a family with his wife Sally. However, a surprise visit from his old friend and sparring partner "Marvelous" Marvin Hagler got him back in the ring. Rocky was Hagler's sparring partner in 1979 for his first World Title fight with Vito Antuofermo. The two became friends, and Hagler promised if he was ever in the area to stop and see Fratto. Hagler made good on his promise and stopped into Fratto's Lounge in Geneva, New York in 1983. Fratto would fight two more times before retiring for good in 1986.

=== Boxing manager, trainer and promoter ===
Fratto stayed involved with boxing, managing Robert "Push-up" Frazier to a World Title bout with Ronald "Winky" Wright in 2001.

== Personal life ==
Rocky Fratto currently resides in Geneva, New York with his wife Sally Ann Pitifer. They have three sons, Raffaele, Mario and Frank.
