= Massimo Bruschini =

Italian boxer

Personal information
- Nationality: Italian
- Born: 30 August 1942; Rome, Italy
- Died: 28 December 1975 (aged 33); Rome, Italy

Sport
- Sport: Boxing

Massimo Bruschini (30 August 1942 – 28 December 1975) was an Italian boxer. He competed in the men's light middleweight event at the 1964 Summer Olympics.
