= Moisés Fajardo =

Spanish boxer

Personal information
- Nationality: Spanish
- Born: 5 July 1947 (age 79) Barlovento, Spain

Sport
- Sport: Boxing

Moisés Fajardo (born 5 July 1947) is a Spanish boxer. He competed in the men's light middleweight event at the 1968 Summer Olympics.
