= Józef Grzesiak (resistance fighter) =

Polish scouting leader and resistance fighter

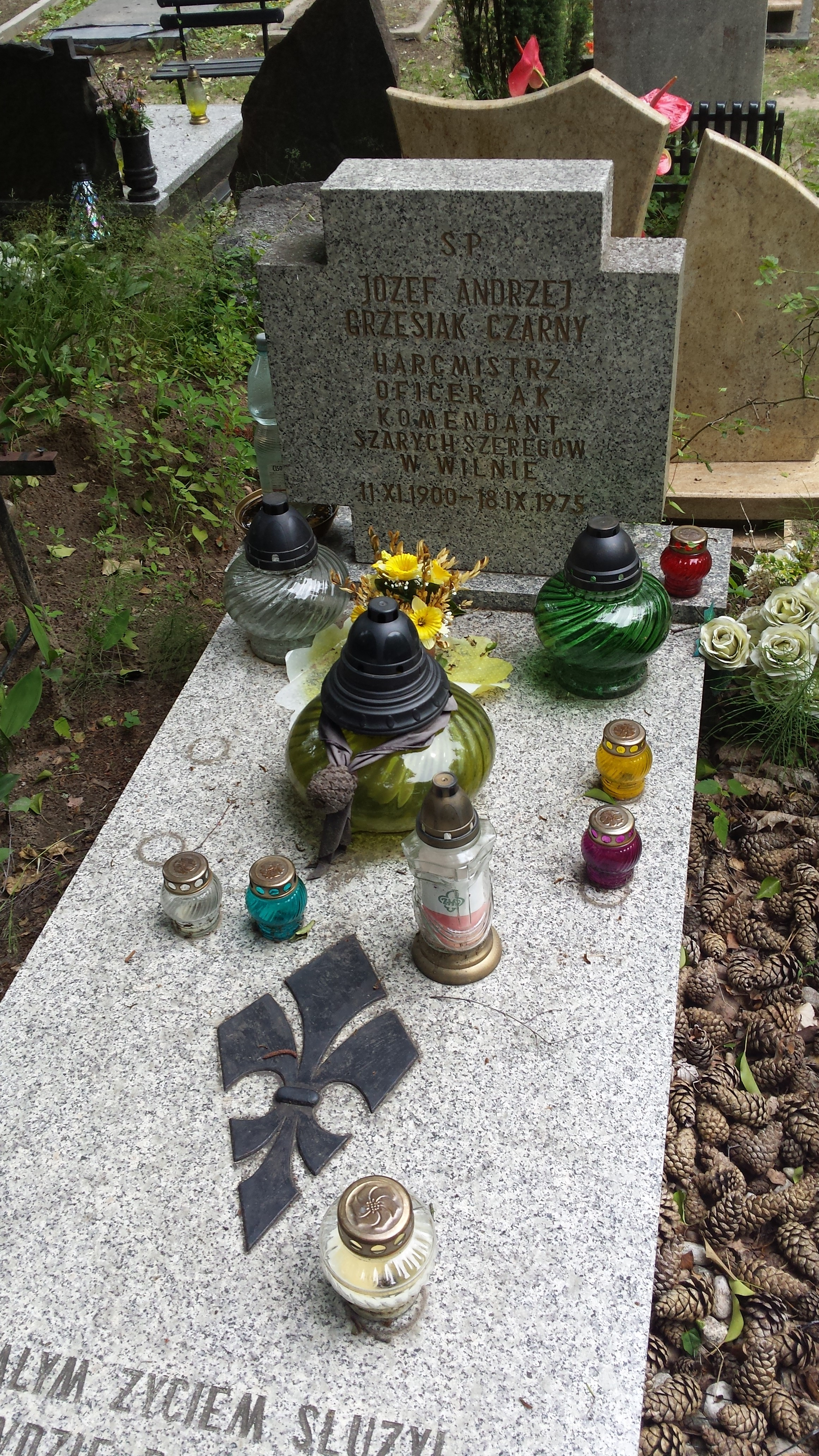
- Born: 11 November 1900; Kraków, Austria-Hungary
- Died: 18 September 1975 (aged 74); Gdańsk, Poland

Józef Andrzej Grzesiak, codename Czarny (11 November 1900 in Kraków – 18 September 1975 in Gdańsk, Poland), was a Polish Scoutmaster (harcmistrz). As were the majority of Polish Scoutmasters during the Second World War, he was also a member of the AK-Szare Szeregi resistance organization.
