= Eddie Davies (boxer) =

Ghanaian boxer (born 1937)

Personal information
- Full name: Edward Davies
- Nationality: Ghanaian
- Born: 1 December 1937 (age 87)

Sport
- Sport: Boxing

Edward Davies (born 1 December 1937) is a Ghanaian boxer. He competed in the men's light middleweight event at the 1964 Summer Olympics.
