= Bekele Alemu =

Ethiopian boxer (born 1941)

Personal information
- Nationality: Ethiopian
- Born: 26 January 1941 (age 84); Addis Ababa, Ethiopia

Sport
- Sport: Boxing

Bekele Alemu (born 26 January 1941) is an Ethiopian boxer. He competed at the 1964 Summer Olympics and the 1968 Summer Olympics. At the 1968 Summer Olympics, he lost to Eric Blake of Great Britain.
