= Stephen Thega =

Kenyan boxer (1946–2021)

Personal information
- Nationality: Kenyan
- Born: 9 February 1946 Murang'a, Kenya
- Died: 28 September 2021 (aged 75) Nairobi, Kenya

Sport
- Sport: Boxing

Stephen Thega (9 February 1946 – 28 September 2021) was a Kenyan boxer.

He competed at the 1968 Summer Olympics and the 1972 Summer Olympics.

Thega died from COVID-19 in 2021.
