= Anna Grzesiak =

Polish triathlete (born 1987)

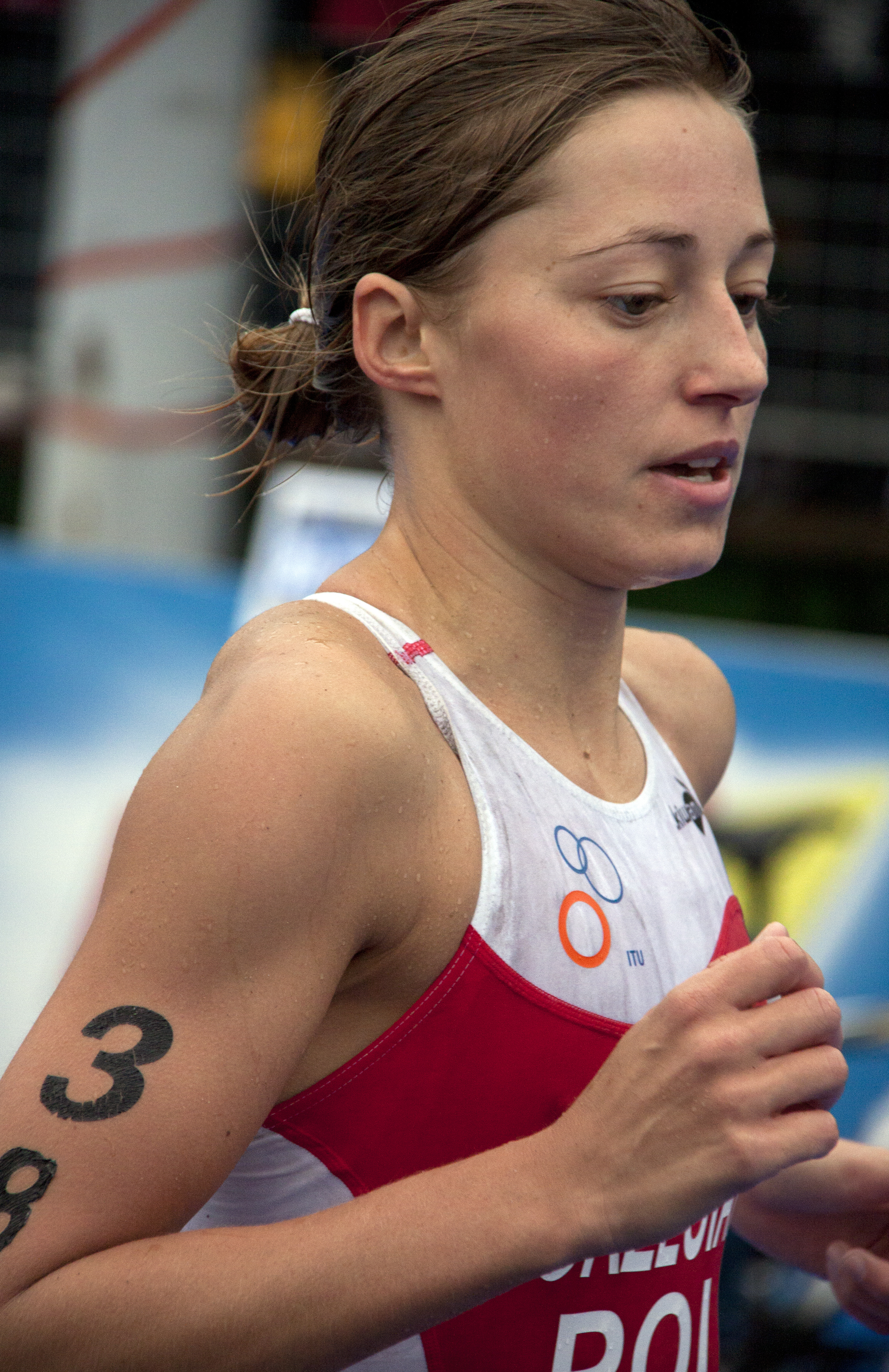
Anna Grzesiak placing 17th at the World Championships in Budapest, 2010.

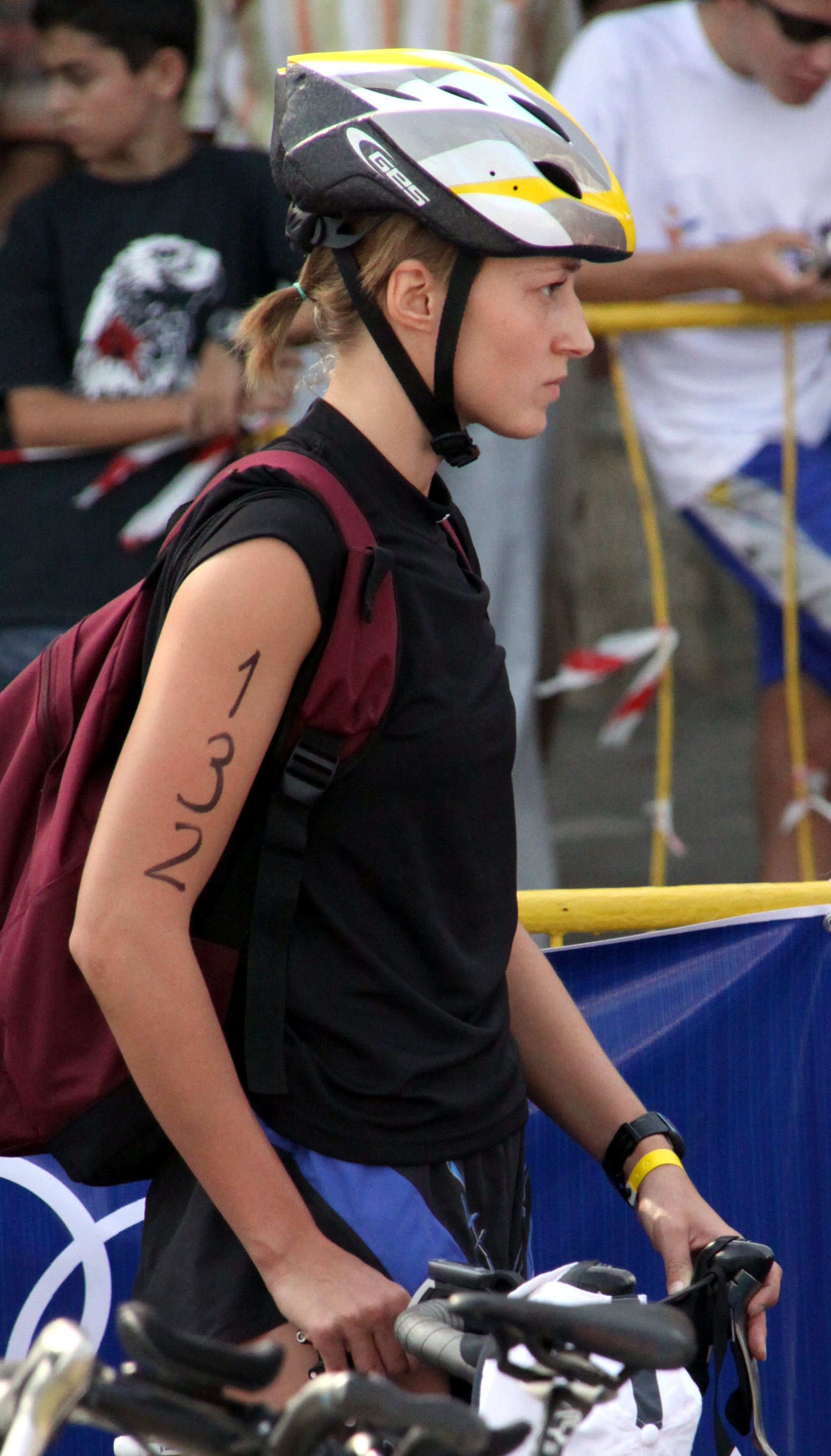
Anna Grzesiak checking in at Alanya, 2009.

Anna Grzesiak (born 30 January 1987), is a Polish professional elite triathlete from Kalisz.

In 2008, aged 21, Anna Grzesiak started to take part in ITU triathlons and directly entered the elite category. She placed seventh in her very first (elite) race: the European Cup in Chania. In the same year at the Duathlon European Championships in Greece, i.e. her only non elite competition, Anna Grzesiak won the bronze medal.

In 2008, she placed third in the Polish Championships (U23), and in 2009 she placed fourth (U23).

In Kalisz, her hometown, Anna had attended a vocational sports school and represented the local club SST Delfin Kalisz.

Now she studies physiotherapy at the Akademia Wychowania Fizycznego im. Eugeniusza Piaseckiego w Poznaniu, in Poznań, and represents the AZS AWF Katowice club.

== ITU Competitions ==
The following list is based upon the official ITU rankings and the Athlete's Profile Page.

Unless indicated otherwise the following competitions are Olympic Distance Triathlons and refer to the Elite category.

Date	Competition	Place	Rank
2007-09-09	Premium European Cup	Kedzierzyn Kozle	DNS
2008-04-13	European Cup	Chania	7
2008-05-24	Duathlon European Championships (U23)	Serres	3
2008-06-28	9th World University Championship / Triathlon	Erdek	19
2008-08-24	European Cup & Small States of Europe Championships	Weiswampach	15
2009-08-30	Premium European Cup	Kedzierzyn Kozle	31
2009-10-25	Premium European Cup	Alanya	21
2010-04-18	European Cup	Antalya	15
2010-05-30	10th World University Championship	Valencia	5
2010-05-30	10th World University Championship (Team)	Valencia	1
2010-07-03	European Championships	Athlone	32
2010-08-29	Premium European Cup	Almere	9
2010-09-11	Dextro Energy World Championship Series, Grand Final: U23 Championships	Budapest	17

BG = the sponsor British Gas · DNF = did not finish · DNS = did not start
