= Józef Grzesiak (boxer) =

Polish boxer (1941–2020)

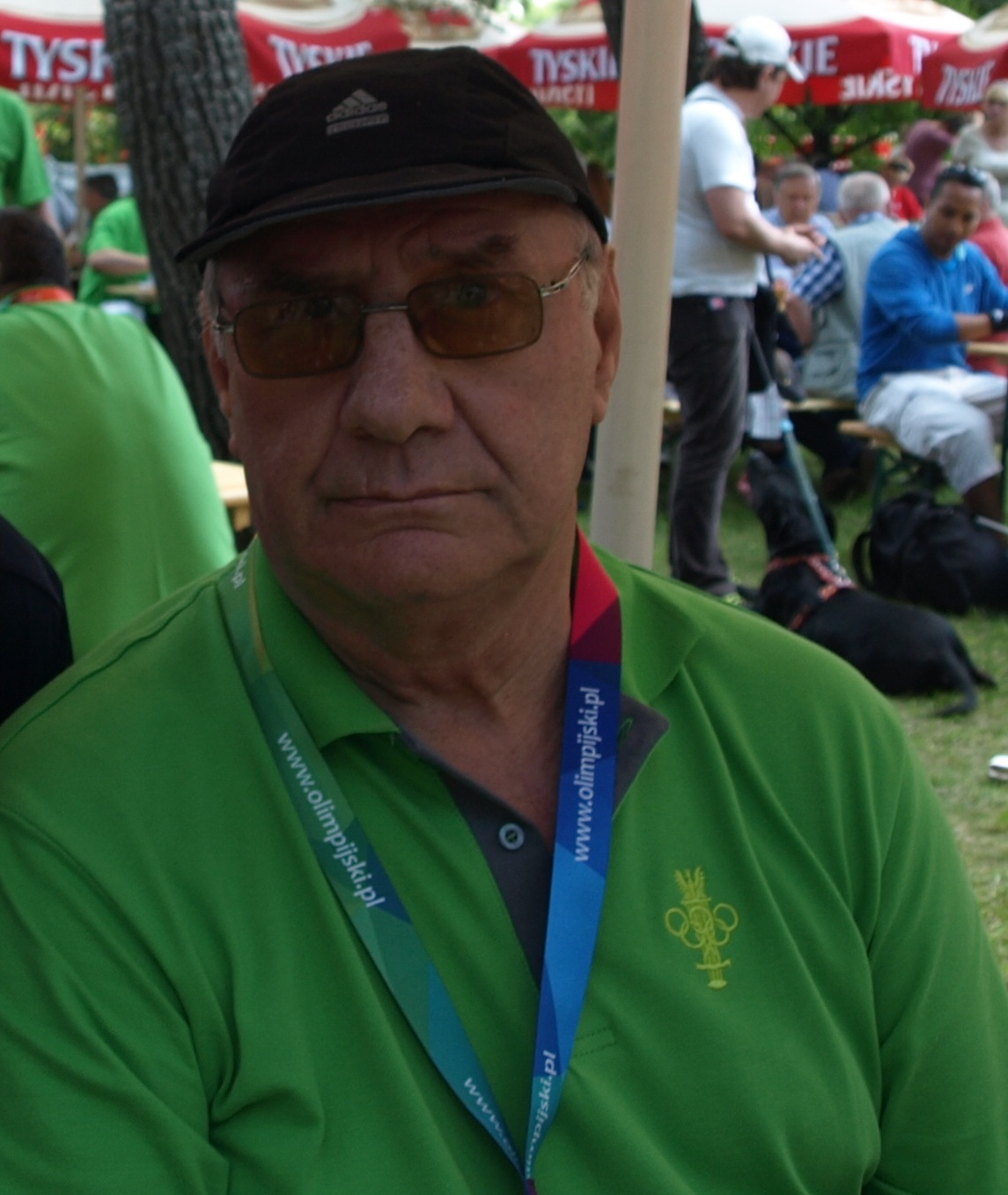

Medal record

Men's Boxing

Representing Poland

Olympic Games
Bronze medal – third place	1964 Tokyo	Light-middleweight

Józef Grzesiak (18 February 1941 – 30 May 2020) was a boxer from Poland.

He competed for Poland in the 1964 Summer Olympics held in Tokyo, Japan in the light-middleweight event where he finished in third place, winning a bronze medal.
