= Alexander Yagubkin =

Soviet boxer (1961–2013)

Personal information
- Nationality: Ukrainian
- Born: Alexander Gennadiyevich Yagubkin; 25 April 1961 Stalino, Ukrainian SSR, Soviet Union
- Died: 7 August 2013 (aged 52) Donetsk, Ukraine

Sport
- Sport: Boxing
- Weight class: Heavyweight
- Club: Avangard
Medal record
Men's boxing
Representing Soviet Union
Friendship Games
Bronze medal – third place	1984 Havana	Heavyweight
World Championships
Gold medal – first place	1982 Munich	Heavyweight
World Cup
Silver medal – second place	1981 Montreal	Heavyweight
Gold medal – first place	1983 Rome	Heavyweight
Gold medal – first place	1985 Seoul	Heavyweight
Junior World Championships
Bronze medal – third place	1979 Yokohama	Heavyweight
European Championships
Gold medal – first place	1981 Tampere	Heavyweight
Gold medal – first place	1983 Varna	Heavyweight
Gold medal – first place	1985 Budapest	Heavyweight
Silver medal – second place	1987 Turin	Super heavyweight

Alexander Gennadiyevich Yagubkin (25 April 1961 – 7 August 2013) was a Soviet Olympic boxer, who competed between 1979 and 1988. The only Soviet boxer to become the World heavyweight champion (1982), he never turned pro due to political restrictions imposed by the Soviet government. He was ranked the world's #2 amateur heavyweight by the AIBA in 1984, and #1 in 1986.

== Early years ==
Yagubkin was born and grew up in the Petrovsky district of Stalino (now Donetsk). The city had 11,000 registered boxers by 1984. He took up boxing in 1974 at the age of thirteen with the Avangard Sports Society and won three consecutive Soviet Youth Championships in 1978, 1979 and 1980. In December 1980, in Tomsk, he won the Soviet Championship in 91 kg. Yagubkin has excelled, and Soviet coach Artyom Lavrov said this is a boxer worthy of his success. "In Russian, "amateur" and "like" are expressed by the same word lyubitel. He is a real amateur. He likes what he is doing." "I hope to follow the tradition of the Russian heavyweights," Yagubkin said.

Apart from boxing, he was schooling as an aircraft technician, and later graduated from the Slavyansk Civil Aviation Vocational School. Afterwards, Yagubkin graduated from the Kiev Athletics Institute.

== Career ==
Steve Sneddon of the Reno Gazette-Journal described Yagubkin as "a classic boxer with an educated left jab." As Yagubkin described his style in his own words, "I prefer the technical boxing, rather than the bump boxing." His style has been built around an effective jab. Untypically for a southpaw outboxer, he never got himself prepared for any particular style of his next opponent. "I'm never bothered not knowing an opponent. It's better not knowing him before going into the ring. If you prepare for one thing, it's difficult to change in the ring. A few seconds is enough to see what someone is doing." At the age of 23, he has won 155 of his 168 bouts. After he defeated Canadian Willie DeWitt, Novosti Press Agency praised him, "Yagubkin is known for his staunchness, courage, cold-bloodedness, flexible tactics and desire for victory. Always go with cold-bloodedness. Besides, Yagubkin won on points over deWitt, 21, at the World Cup in Montreal in 1981. DeWitt has a puncher's chance but Yagubkin rates a solid edge in international experience." "He's got a very strong punch. I want to avoid getting hit," said Yagubkin of DeWitt. After DeWitt won a decision a year-and-a-half later, Yagubkin did not complain about the result. Yagubkin only said he had not been at his best. After his two stand-offs versus American Michael Bentt, as Yagubkin beat Bent badly at the World Cup in Seoul, where Yagubkin was regarded as one of the sport's outstanding defensive stylists, Bentt got himself the poster of Yagubkin on a wall in his room. U.S. Team visited Yagubkin in the USSR in 1984.

As the American professional boxing promoters negotiated with the Soviet Boxing Federation sending Russian boxers to the U.S. to compete there professionally, they specifically requested for Yagubkin, Miroshnichenko, and Yakovlev. Bob Arum negotiated with the Soviet Ministry of Sport, he wanted them to turn pro on the second Leonard vs. Hearns card. In the words of the Los Angeles Times sportswriter Earl Gustkey, "Yagubkin does have great movement, however, and is a brilliant defensive boxer. He's an accurate puncher, though not a banger. After Adams [Ken Adams, 1988 U.S. Olympic Coach] brings him up to speed on the pro game, it's not hard to imagine Yagubkin running U.S. pro heavyweights ragged and piling up a lot of early wins on decisions. In fact, all three Soviet heavyweights would figure to be in significantly better physical condition than many of the fat U.S. heavyweights on the scene."

But that never happen as the Soviet government dismissed the idea early in 1989, and did not allow the three boxers neither to turn pro, nor to be employed as a sparring partners for the professionals.

== Highlights ==
(silver) Friendship Tournament, Yambol, Bulgaria, July 1979:

- Finals: Lost to Peter Philipp (East Germany) by decision

Feliks Stamm Memorial, Warsaw, Poland, November 1979:

- 1/8: Defeated Leszek Rybiński (Poland) RET 2
- 1/4: Lost to Anders Eklund (Sweden) by split decision, 2–3

(bronze) Junior World Championships, Yokohama, Japan, December 1979:

- 1/4: Defeated Kazuhiro Sawada (Japan) RSC 1
- 1/2: Lost to Marvis Frazier (United States) by unanimous decision, 0–5

USSR–USA Duals, Moscow, Russia, January 1980:

- Defeated David Bey (United States) by unanimous decision, 3–0

(silver) Belgrade Open, Belgrade, Yugoslavia, February 1980:

- Finals: Lost to Aziz Salihu (Yugoslavia) by majority decision, 1–4

USA–USSR Duals, Showboat Hotel, Las Vegas, Nevada, January 1981:

- Defeated Tyrell Biggs (United States) by decision

USA–USSR Duals, Hirsch Coliseum, Shreveport, Louisiana, February 1981:

- Defeated Freddie Guzman (United States) KO 2 (2:15)

(gold) European Championships, Tampere, Finland, May 1981:

- 1/4: Defeated Grzegorz Skrzecz (Poland) by unanimous decision, 5–0
- 1/2: Defeated Ion Cernat (Romania) by unanimous decision, 5–0
- Finals: Defeated Jürgen Fanghänel (East Germany) by unanimous decision, 5–0

(silver) World Cup, Montreal, Canada, November 1981:

- 1/4: Defeated Willie DeWitt (Canada) by split decision, 3–2
- 1/2: Defeated Luis Castillo (Ecuador) by decision
- Finals: Lost to Carl Williams (United States) by unanimous decision, 0–5

USSR–USA Duals, Lenin Sports Palace, Moscow, Russia, January 1982:

- Defeated Mark Mahone (United States) by decision

(gold) World Championships, Munich, West Germany, May 1982:

- 1/8: Defeated Olaf Mayer (Austria) by unanimous decision, 5–0
- 1/4: Defeated Xhevdet Peci (Yugoslavia) by unanimous decision, 5–0
- 1/2: Defeated Grzegorz Skrzecz (Poland) by unanimous decision, 5–0
- Finals: Defeated Jürgen Fanghänel (East Germany) by unanimous decision, 5–0

(gold) Belgrade Open, Belgrade, Yugoslavia, November 1982:

- Finals: Defeated Milenko Andrić (Yugoslavia) by decision

USA–USSR Duals, Caesars Palace, Las Vegas, Nevada, February 1983:

- Defeated Warren Thompson (United States) by decision

USA–USSR Duals, Indiana Convention Center, Indianapolis, Indiana, March 1983:

- Defeated Henry Tillman (United States) by decision

AIBA International Challenge, Reno, Nevada, May 1983:

- Lost to Willie DeWitt (Canada) by split decision, 2–3

(gold) European Championships, Varna, Bulgaria, May 1983:

- 1/4: Defeated Arnold van der Lijnde (Netherlands) by unanimous decision, 5–0
- 1/2: Defeated Paul Golumbeanu (Romania) by unanimous decision, 5–0
- Finals: Defeated Gyula Alvics (Hungary) by unanimous decision, 5–0

(gold) World Cup, Rome, Italy, October 1983:

- 1/4: Defeated Michael Kenny (New Zealand) by unanimous decision, 5–0
- 1/2: Defeated Angelo Musone (Italy) by majority decision, 4–1
- Finals: Defeated Luis Castillo (Ecuador) by unanimous decision, 5–0

(gold) King's Cup, Bangkok, Thailand, April 1984:

- 1/4: Defeated Mikael Ölund (Sweden) by decision
- 1/2: Defeated Habibullah Khan (Pakistan) RSC 3
- Finals: Defeated Avery Rawls (United States) by decision

(bronze) Friendship Games, Estadio Latinoamericano, Havana, Cuba, August 1984:

- 1/2: Lost to Hermenegildo Báez (Cuba) by split decision, 2–3

USA–USSR Duals, Sparks Convention Center, Reno, Nevada, January 1985:

- Defeated James Pritchard (United States) by unanimous decision, 3–0

(gold) European Championships, Budapest, Hungary, May–June 1985:

- 1/4: Defeated Søren Thomsen (Denmark) by unanimous decision, 5–0
- 1/2: Defeated Deyan Kirilov (Bulgaria) by unanimous decision, 5–0
- Finals: Defeated Gyula Alvics (Hungary) by unanimous decision, 5–0

(gold) World Cup, Seoul, South Korea, November 1985:

- 1/4: Defeated Lee Hoo Soo (South Korea) by unanimous decision, 5–0
- 1/2: Defeated Michael Bentt (United States) by majority decision, 4–1
- Finals: Defeated Jimmy Peau (New Zealand) KO 2

USSR–USA Duals, Olimpiysky Sport Complex, Moscow, Russia, January 1986:

- Defeated Orbit Pough (United States) by unanimous decision, 3–0

(gold) King's Cup, Bangkok, Thailand, April 1986:

- Finals: Defeated Mark Saris (Australia) RSC 3

World Championships, Reno, Nevada, May 1986:

- 1/8: Defeated Domenico D'Amico (Canada) by majority decision, 4–1
- 1/4: Lost to Michael Bentt (United States) by split decision, 2–3

(silver) European Championships, Turin, Italy, June 1987:

- 1/4: Defeated Istvan Levai (Hungary) by split decision, 3–2
- 1/2: Defeated Petar Stoimenov (Bulgaria) RSCI 3
- Finals: Lost to Ulli Kaden (East Germany) by split decision, 2–3

== Retirement and later life ==
Despite being one of the world's top heavyweights, Yagubkin, who staunchly represented an essentially provincial sports club on the outskirts, turning down all offers to join highly regarded sports societies, for this and some other purely political reasons never made it to the Soviet Olympic boxing squad on three occasions, in 1980: on the pretext that he was way too young and inexperienced, as he was replaced with Pyotr Zayev (who won the silver), in 1984: he qualified successfully, but the Soviet government boycotted the Olympics, and in 1988: on the pretext that he was too old, as he was replaced with Ramzan Sebiyev (who was dropped out in the preliminaries). He retired shortly afterwards. Yagubkin won 9 out of 11 fights versus American boxers during the USA–USSR match-ups.

== Honours and awards ==
- He was honoured as a Master of Sports of the USSR.
- In 1989, Yagubkin was made an honorary citizen of Ecuador for match-up with his former opponent Luis Castillo.

== Death ==
Yagubkin died of heart failure after repeated cardiac arrest (previous heart seizure roughly a month before his death was relatively mild and went unnoticed, he did not pay much attention) on 7 August 2013 in Donetsk, Ukraine.
