= Boxing at the 1980 Summer Olympics – Heavyweight =

Boxing competitions

Heavyweight boxing at the Games of the XXII Olympiad
- Venue: Olympiysky Sports Complex
- Date: 25 July – 2 August 1980
- Competitors: 14 from 14 nations

Medalists
1st place, gold medalist(s)		Teófilo Stevenson	Cuba
2nd place, silver medalist(s)		Pyotr Zayev	Soviet Union
3rd place, bronze medalist(s)		István Lévai	Hungary
3rd place, bronze medalist(s)		Jürgen Fanghänel	East Germany

The heavyweight boxing competition at the 1980 Olympic Games in Moscow was held from 25 July to 2 August at the Olympiysky Sports Complex. 14 boxers from 14 nations competed.

== Schedule ==
Date	Time	Round
Friday, 25 July 1980	12:00; 18:00	Round of 16
Wednesday, 30 July 1980	13:00	Quarterfinals
Thursday, 31 July 1980	13:00	Semifinals
Saturday, 2 August 1980	15:00	Final

== Results ==
Round of 16
Solomon Ataga (NGR)
Teófilo Stevenson (CUB)	KO
William Isangura (TAN)
Grzegorz Skrzecz (POL)	RSC
Petar Stoimenov (BUL)	RSC
Naasan Ajjoub (SYR)
Jürgen Fanghänel (GDR)	4
Luis Castillo (ECU)	1
Azis Salihu (YUG)	0
Pyotr Zayev (URS)	5
Teodor Pîrjol (ROU)	1
Francesco Damiani (ITA)	4

Quarterfinals
Anders Eklund (SWE)	1
István Lévai (HUN)	4
Teófilo Stevenson (CUB)	KO
Grzegorz Skrzecz (POL)
Petar Stoimenov (BUL)
Jürgen Fanghänel (GDR)	RSC
Pyotr Zayev (URS)	5
Francesco Damiani (ITA)	0

Semifinals
István Lévai (HUN)	0
Teófilo Stevenson (CUB)	5
Jürgen Fanghänel (GDR)	0
Pyotr Zayev (URS)	5

Final
Teófilo Stevenson (CUB)	4
Pyotr Zayev (URS)	1
