= Sport in Pristina =

Karateka from Kosovo

Pristina is the epicenter of sport in Kosovo, where activity is organized across amateur and professional levels, sport organizations and clubs, regulated by the Kosovo Olympic Committee and the Ministry of Culture, Youth and Sport. Pristina is known for their success in Sports such as football, boxing, basketball and futsal. They compete for five seasons in the Yugoslav First League between 1983 and 1988 in which their best finish came in their first ever season in 1983-84 finishing in 8th place. In the same season they reached the Mitropa Cup finals of 1983–84, were FC Prishtina finished Runners up to Eisenstadt from Austria. as well as reaching the semifinals in the Yugoslav Cup in 1987-88.

In the 2010s, basketball was the most successful sport in Pristina as KB Prishtina won two BIBL Championships in back to back seasons 2014-15 and 2015-16 being the only Basketball Team in Kosovo to do so. Also qualifying for the FIBA Europe Cup Play-offs in 2018-19. Reaching the Round of 16 playing against Pallacanestro Varese.

== Sport clubs and organizations in Pristina ==
Sport in Pristina is organized in units called Municipal Leagues. There are seven Municipal Leagues in Pristina. The Football Municipal League consists of 18 clubs, the Basketball Municipal League consists of 5 clubs, the Handball Municipal League consists of 2 clubs, table tennis and chess consist of 6 clubs each, the Karate Municipal League consists of 15 and in the Municipal League of Tennis there are 2 clubs The list below displays some of the sport clubs registered in Kosovo's Accreditation Directorate. 89 clubs from Pristina populate the list, which apart from the more popular sports shown below also includes karate, shooting, weight lifting, swimming, skiing, taekwondo, chess, kick box, athletics, cycling, fishing, etc.

Club	Sport	Date of registration
Prishtina	Football	2005
Flamurtari	Football	2005
2 Korriku	Football	2006
Rilindja	Football	2006
Ramiz Sadiku	Football	2006
Kosova	Football	2006
Bardhoshi	Football	2007
Prishtina	Basketball	2005
Prishtina Pro Basket	Basketball	2007
Eurobasket	Basketball	2007
RTV21	Basketball	2012
Newborn Prishtina	Basketball	2013
Prishtina (women)	Handball	2005
Prishtina (men)	Handball	2006
Prishtina (men)	Volleyball	2008
Prishtina (women)	Volleyball	2008
Universiteti i Prishtinës	Volleyball	2008
Prishtina	Tennis	2008
Kosova (men)	Table Tennis	2005
Kosova (women)	Table Tennis	2006
Shkolla e Pingpongut	Table Tennis	2007
Prishtina (Men)	Table Tennis	2007
Prishtina (Women)	Table Tennis	2007
Gerçek	Table Tennis	2007

== Football in Pristina ==
Before there were any clubs or competition, after the end of the First World War, in 1919 football was played by soldiers, officers and students who studied abroad in the Universities of France, Switzerland, Italy, Austria, England, Romania, Hungary etc. and began to return home to Pristina. One of these students, studying in France, brought the first football in Pristina in 1919. The ball was a present from a French doctor. After the arrival of the first ball in Pristina, it was mostly youngsters who kicked it around, unorganized and with no institutional support. During that time, only friendly matches were played. The city of Pristina was a small town of 16,000 citizens when in 1922, the first "blue" club named Kosova" was founded. The club consisted mainly of Pristina Garrison soldiers and did not participate in official competition due to not being registered. The oldest club of Kosovo was not competing in official levels, but was playing friendly matches with other teams, domestic and from the region. In 1926, Bashkimi football club was also founded in Pristina and consisted mainly of craftsmen. With the advantage of strong material consolidation in comparison to KF Kosova, Bashkimi was registered in the Sub league of football in Banovina, Skopje. In 1945, Bashkimi won the championship title in Kosovo, a success which they also repeated a year after. Following World War II, KF Bashkimi and KF Kosova continued to be active in the football field and they were joined by other clubs, such as Milicioneri, Bratsvo and Radniçki. In 1947, KF Bashkimi and KF Kosova merged into one club by the name of Proleter. Proleter changed its name to Jedinstvo in the 1948/1949. Jedinstvo which was strong in both economic and organizational aspect merged with Bratsvo from Pristina and Zheleznicari from Fushe Kosove. The new team named Kosova became leader in state championship by winning in two consecutive seasons during 1951/52 and 1953/54 Since 1960 the club has won 19 championship titles, including the last season of 2012/2013. During this period, KF Prishtina has become the only Kosovar football club to win the Kosovar Superliga and Kosovar Cup trophies in one season (2012/13). Their fan club is called Plisat. Some of the most notable players of this club who found their success in international clubs later on include Debatik Curri, Fadil Vokrri, Armend Dallku, Ardian Kozniku, Kushtrim Shala, Goran Dorovic, Zoran Batrovic.

=== 1922–1926: Beginnings of FC Prishtina (Futboll Klub Kosova) ===
Football in Kosovo has been played and developed since 1919, shortly after the end of the First World War. Many demobilized soldiers and officers, as well as students studying at universities in France, Switzerland, Italy, Austria, England, Bucharest, Budapest, and elsewhere, began to return to their home countries. Thus, a student of Samerslen College Grenoble (France) brought the first soccer ball to Pristina in 1919. This gift he had from a doctor where he came from.

After the arrival of the first ball in Pristina and Kosovo, mainly young people started running after it, but there was no organized way of playing.

Only friendly matches took place at that time. The city of Pristina was just a town with 16,000 inhabitants when in 1922 the first blue club was formed, called "Kosova". This was a club that at that time consisted of soldiers of the Pristina Garrison and did not hold official matches because it was not registered, but in its formation constantly played quality footballers of the Pristina Garrison army.

Kosovo's oldest club did not compete at official levels, but played friendly matches with other teams, meanwhile formed by the country and Macedonia. In 1926 in Pristina was formed the football club "Bashkimi", which gathered mainly craft youth. This club was materially much more consolidated than "Kosova". This team took advantage of the opportunity and registered with the Banovina Skopje Football Sub-League. There is no data on the level of competition.

=== 1945–1970s: First success in Yugoslavian Football for FC Prishtina ===
After the end of the war the club returned to the Yugoslav league system and played for mostly in the Yugoslav Second League. FC Prishtina won in 1945 and 1946 they won the Kosovo Province Titel and are the first Kosovar to do so but the success did not end there. In 1947 FC Prishtina wrote History for being one of the founder Clubs in the newly formed SFR Yugoslavia Cup in this Season. In their first ever cup match they played against Goce Delcev from Prilep. FC Prishtina won this match with 1-0 and qualify for the next Round. In the second round FC Prishtina had a harder tie against Rabotnicki Skopje from the second League. FC Prishtina didn't give up and won this Match away in Shkup with 1-2 and became the first Albanian club to ever reach the round of 16 in the Yugoslav Cup in their first ever cup season. In the Round of sixteen FC Prishtina had to play away against Partizan Belgrad despite a good performance they lost this match with 2-0 but it was still a success for Prishtina at that time.

FC Prishtina came close to qualify for their first time ever in the Yugoslav First League in the season 1972–73 but they lost the playoffs games against NK Osijek from Croatia and could not Progress in the main division. After losing in the home in Prishtina the leg with 1–2 and away with 0–1 in Osijek.

=== 1981–1989: The Golden Generation ===

1983–84 Yugoslav First League starting lineup vs. Red Star Belgrade (4–4–2)

FC Prishtina was now stabilized and a scary team had been created and only its explosion was expected. The 1980/01 season was difficult both for Pristina and for the entire population of Kosovo due to the political situation that had been created. From March (1981), Dimovski will be replaced by another coach, the Hungarian from Vojvodina, Béla Pálfi (March 1981 - July 1983), who has great merit for qualifying the team in the elite and creating a great team. The team this season was forced to spend almost the entire spring season outside the city (in Kragujevac, Serbia) due to the ban on sports activity in Kosovo and had managed without any problems to rank in the middle of the table. Prishtina with Palfi, in the 1981–82 season finishes in 8th place. In the 1982–83 season, the white and blue team had finally started to make history and after 60 years of its creation, and after 20 years of struggling in the Second League, a generation, called Golden, was finally created that violated all in front of him, who had extraordinary leaders and an army of fans with an average of 30,000 per match.

There was no stopping the team from the Kosovar capital and not only that, this team had become so big that now a 22 Million Yugoslavia was afraid of him and aroused respect for him. FC Prishtina after entering the first Federal League has competed for five consecutive seasons in it. In her first year in the elite, she also played in the Central European Cup where she took second place among the four teams. In the same year, two players from Prishtina, in the same match, make their debut for the then Yugoslav national team, the strikers: Fadil Vokrri and Zoran Batrovic. For Batrovic, this was the only appearance left, while Vokrri had continued to defend the colors of the state that no longer exists. This did honor to Pristina and elevated it among the biggest teams in the country. Meanwhile, in five years of competitions in the First League, Prishtina was led by well-known Yugoslav football names. Fuad Muzurovic had been the first Pristina coach to lead the team to the highest level of the country, which had the league among the four or five strongest in Europe. Muzurovic, later the coach of Bosnia and Herzegovina, had led the team from July 1983 until the same time in 1984. Then he returned in July 1985 and led the capital from Prishtina to in August 1986.

After Muzurovic, the bench was taken over by the other strategist of the former Yugoslavia, Vukashin Vishnjevac, who, however, had not been so dear to some key players of the team, as he had withstood the pressure and his adventure in Prishtina had ended in November 1984.

Then, quite successfully for three months, the team was led by the Albanian coach, Ajet Shosholli. Shosholli until that time had been only the second Albanian coach, after Mensur Bajrami (January–April 1977), who had led the team.

Meanwhile, the position in the table had been aggravated and the leaders of the club had been forced to find a famous coach and the solution was with Miroslav Blazevic.

The lease that later with the Croatian Representative reaches the third place in "France '98", contributes to the merits of the club remaining in the First League. The lease had only lasted for two months, long enough for him to remain memorable of that time.

Prishtina continued for another three seasons in the top league and in its ranks were two other coaches of the time, Milovan orioriq (October 1986 - September 1987) and Josip Duvançi (September 1987 – June 1988), with whom Prishtina was eventually relegated from the league.

The team had left some of its stars, some had now retired, while the tense political situation and the decline of interest of Kosovo's political and social structures had made Pristina no longer able to stay in the first federal League. With the relegation from the League, Prishtina brought together the next generation of talent from Kosovo who were first led by another well-known name in former Yugoslav football, Miladin Ivivadinovi (July 1988 – March 1989). In the first season since the fall (1988/89) Prishtina played with -6 points. The team fought and achieved culminating results but did not manage to climb back into the elite.

Season	League	Pos	Pld	W	D	L	GF	GA	Pts	Notes
1979–80	Yugoslav Second League	6	30	11	11	8	27	25	33	2nd round
1980–81	Yugoslav Second League	8	30	9	12	9	27	22	30	1st round
1981–82	Yugoslav Second League	9	30	10	8	12	36	32	28	1st round
1982–83	Yugoslav Second League	1	34	20	9	5	65	30	49	1st round (promoted)
1983–84	Yugoslav First League	8	34	15	3	16	36	55	33	1st round
1984–85	Yugoslav First League	10	34	13	6	15	44	49	32	1st round
1985–86	Yugoslav First League	11	34	13	6	15	37	47	32	1st round
1986–87	Yugoslav First League	14	34	13	4	17	47	52	30	1st round
1987–88	Yugoslav First League	18	34	10	7	17	43	59	27	Semi-finals (relegated)
1988–89	Yugoslav Second League	10	38	18	5 (2)	15	42	40	32 ^{1}	1st round ^{2}
1989–90	Yugoslav Second League	4	38	21	4 (1)	13	61	39	43	?^{2}
1990–91	Yugoslav Second League	8	36	16	3 (1)	17	48	44	33	?^{2}

=== After 1991 ===
After Kosovo proclaimed independence from Serbia, FC Prishtina left the Yugoslav football league system and became part of the Independent League of Kosovo, which became the highest football division of Kosovo and would be renamed to the Football Superleague of Kosovo after the Kosovo War in 1999. As the Kosovar club with most successful results in the past and the best infrastructure, FC Prishtina won the first edition of the competition in the 1991–92 season. Afterwards, it won the competition again in the 1995–96 and 1996–97 seasons.

Since 1991, FC Prishtina has been Kosovo champion 11 times, making it the most successful Kosovar club since Kosovo left the Yugoslav football league system. Between 1945 and 1991 the Kosovar league was a regional league of the Yugoslav league system, and FC Prishtina did not gather many titles in that league because it usually competed in higher national levels.

== Futsal ==
Futsal is a promising sport in Pristina.

FC Prishtina competed in the UEFA Futsal Champions League for the first time in the 2020–21 season, entering at the preliminary round. On 21 October 2020, the draw was held and Prishtina were drawn against the Albanian side Tirana. On 25 November 2020, Prishtina beat Tirana at Palace of Youth and Sports in Pristina, this victory secured the qualification for the round of 32, where they faced Spanish giants Barcelona, who defeated FC Prishtina with a result of 9–2. So far their greatest result at this competition.

Season	Competition	Round	Opponent	Home	Away	Agg.
2020–21	UEFA Futsal Champions League	PR	(Albania) Tirana	3–0		
2020–21	UEFA Futsal Champions League	R32	(Spain) Barcelona	2–9		

=== Overall record of FC Prishtina ===
Overall	PPs	GP	W	D	L	GF	GA	GD	PTs
Total	1	2	1	0	1	5	9	-4	3

== Boxing ==
Boxing is the most successful Sport in Pristina. Boxers like Aziz Salihu, Mehmet Bogujevci, Sami Buzoli, Bajram Hasani and Donjeta Sadiku brought success for Pristina in international boxing competitions like the European Boxing Championship, World Boxing Championship and in Boxing at the Summer Olympics.

Aziz Salihu, born in Pristina, is the most successful boxer for Pristina. He won eight Yugoslav championships in which of them five consecutive. He would win two bronze medals at the European Boxing Championship first in 1981 Tampere and for the second time in 1985 in the Super heavyweight category. His biggest boxing success came at the 1984 Summer Olympics in Los Angeles where he won the bronze medal in the Super heavyweight category, he became the first individual athlete from Kosovo to win an Olympic medal. At the Boxing World Cup in 1987 Belgrad he won the bronze medal. Salihu also won the gold medal in Boxing at the 1987 Mediterranean Games in Syria. He became the first Kosovan to compete for the third time for Yugoslavia in Boxing at the 1988 Summer Olympics in Seoul, South Korea.

Sami Buzoli is a boxer who boxed for Pristina. He competed for Yugoslavia for the first time, at the European Championships in 1981. He reached the finals in the Bantamweight category, in which he lost against Viktor Miroshnichenko. He would repeat his feet at the following European Boxing Championship in 1983 Varna, when he won silver for the second time, in his boxing career. The year before he would compete at the World Boxing Championship in 1982 Munich in which he won bronze in the Bantamweight category as well.

Mehmet Bogujevci is a boxer born in Pristina. He won five boxing Championships for Pristina in Yugoslavia. At the European Boxing Championship in 1977 Halle he won bronze in the Light Welterweight category. He would compete at the World Boxing Championship held in 1978 Belgrad in which he would win silber in the light welterweight division, after losing in the finals against Valery Lvov. One year later he would win Gold in boxing at the Mediterranean Games in 1979 Split. Mehmet Bogujevci became the first individual athlete from Kosovo to compete for Yugoslavia at the Olympics at the 1980 Summer Olympics in the men's welterweight category, reaching the quarterfinals, in his sole participation at the Summer Olympics.

Donjeta Sadiku is a female boxer born in Pristina. She is Boxing for the boxing club gollaku in her Hometown. In her youth career she won silver at the 2015 Junior World Boxing Championship in Taipei in the Lightweight Category. The first boxing medal for Kosovo at this competition. Donjeta made her debut for Kosovo at the 2020 Summer Olympics in Tokio in the Women's lightweight discipline. Where she faced in the Round of 32 Caroline Dubois from UK. She lost the fight in the end with 0–5 as she couldn't progress further in this tournament. Sadiku recently won the bronze medal at the 2022 IBA Women's World Boxing Championships in Istanbul. She won the first medal for Kosovo in the Boxing World Championship. It is her first world boxing medal in her boxing career. In the Women's European Boxing Championships in 2022 Budva in which she wrote, history for Kosovo as she became the first ever medalist for her Country, winning bronze in the Lightweight (–60 kg) category. This is the first medal for Kosovo in European Boxing after 35 years.

The boxing club of Pristina competed at the 2022 Mediterranean Games in Oran. In which four men represented Kosovo in Boxing. Shpetim Bajoku won bronze in the Men's light welterweight, after losing controversial in the semifinals against Algerian boxer Yahia Abdelli. He secured Kosovo's first boxing medal after 31 years at this competition.

== Basketball ==
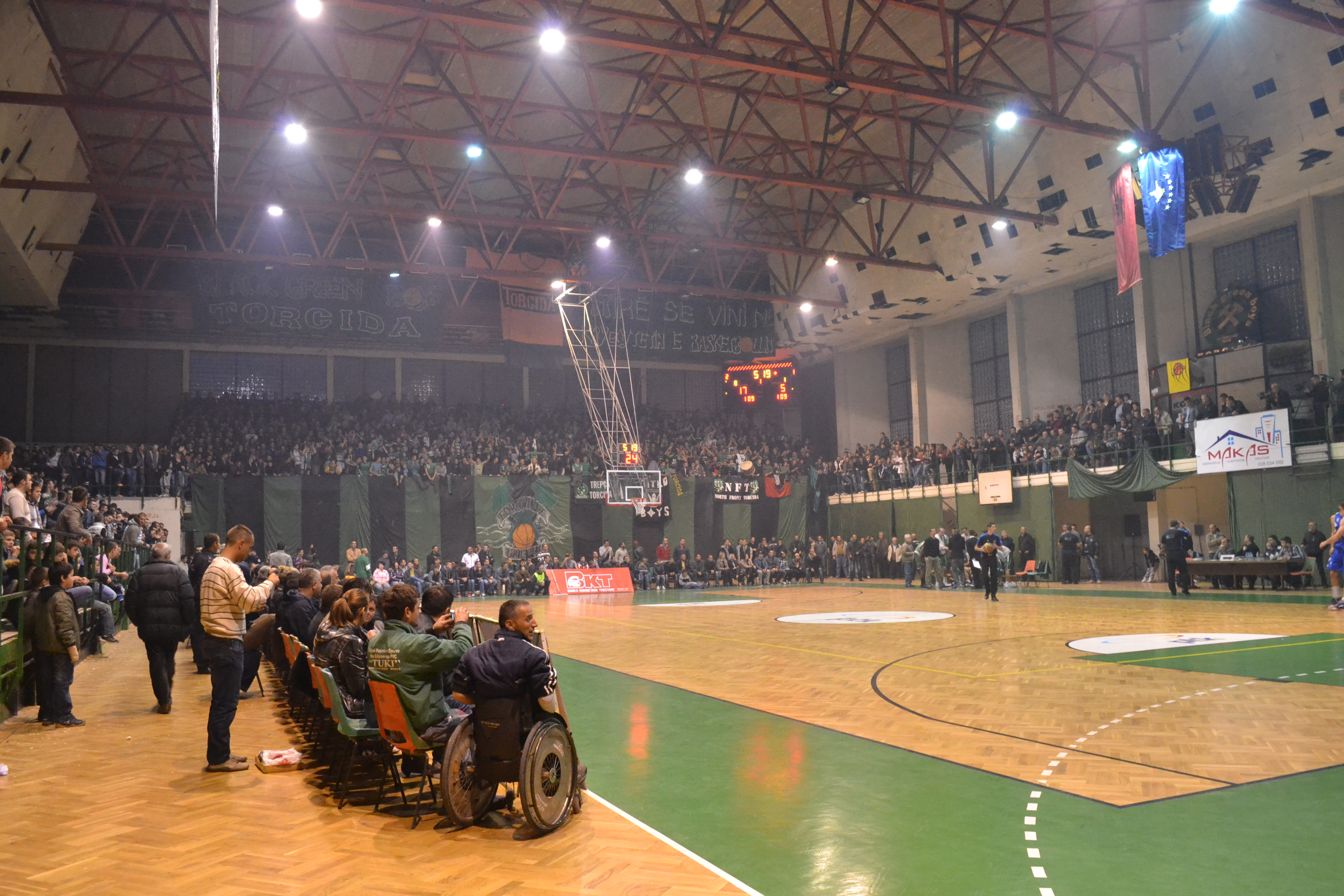
KB Trepça–KB Prishtina game

Sigal Prishtina is the most successful basketball club in Pristina and in Kosovo and is now part of the Balkan League, their first non-local competition. Joining it in the Superleague is another team from Pristina, RTV 21. Sigal Prishtina has dominated national basketball since 2002 by being crowned champions of the national Superleague 14 times in 2001/02, 2002/03, 2005/06, 2006/07, 2007/08, 2008/09, 2009/10, 2010/11, 2014, 2015, 2016, 2017 and most recently in 2019. Being champions of the Kosovo National Cup 15 times (2002, 2003, 2004, 2005, 2006, 2007, 2008, 2009, 2010, 2013, 2016, 2017, 2018, 2019 and last season in 2021) and they also being a seven-time champion of the Supercup of Kosovo first in 2005 and for the last time in 2020. but apart from that Prishtina also enjoyed success outside their borders, as they won twice the Balkan International Basketball League first in 2014-15 after beating BC Rilski Sportist in a two leg final, twice in the finals. In the following season in 2015-16 they beat in the finals montenegrin side Mornar Bar. Winning twice in a row. So far their best achievements for KB Prishtina. Being the only Kosovan basketball club to actually win this competition. KB Prishtina made his debut at the FIBA Europe Cup in 2015-16. Since then Prishtina competed regular at this competition, with their best result came in 2018-19 reaching for the first time in their history the Play-offs. After beating opponents like Cherkaski Mavpy, Steaua București, Szolnoki Olaj and Pınar Karşıyaka. In their campaign, at this competition. At the round of sixteen Prishtina faced Pallacanestro Varese but would lose both matches, in Pristina close with 77–80 and away with 100–84 as they couldn't progress to the quarterfinals. Prishtina has won 15 games in European basketball competitions so far. They also won over 50 matches in the Balkan International Basketball League, since 2013-14. Prishtina also made his debut in the first season of the Liga Unike in 2020-21 they lost against KB Ylli in the quarter-finals and couldn't progress so to the semifinals of this tournament. After more than two years without European basketball KB Prishtina is taking place at the qualifying for the 2022–23 FIBA Europe Cup.

The most famous basketball player to ever manage KB Prishtina was Damir Mulaomerović, the former Euroleague champion from Bosnia played an important role for Prishtina in their 2018-19 season in which they achieved big success in European Basketball and in Kosovo as well.

The female basketball club Univerziteti Prishtina competed in the first and second division Yugoslav Women's Basketball League. They also competed in Kosovo women's basketball league and won six times between 2000 and 2006. They won the Kosovan women's basketball cup seven times between 1999 and 2006. They also competed at the WABA League in 2003-04, in which they qualified for the Final Four after finishing third in the Regular season. They faced the Croatian team Šibenik Jolly JBS in the semifinals. They lost with 81–64. In the third place match they faced another Croatian team,Croatia 2006, and lost 87–81 to finish this tournament in 4th place.

Apart from indoor basketball success, Che Bar streetball team from Pristina has been crowned champion of the Streetball Kosovo national championship in 2013. This victory coincided with Streetball Kosovo's acceptance in the FIBA. This year Pristina is holding the Pristina Challenger 2022 Event from 16 July to 17 July, where about 16 team's participate in that tournament, from several countries.

Dardan Berisha from KB Sigal Prishtina was the best male athlete of 2013 according to Grupi Koha, following the success he had with the club throughout the season.

== Handball ==
Handball activities in Pristina date back as far as 1948 where we see the emerging of the first teams such as Kosova e Prishtinës, along with Trepca e Mitrovicës, Partizani and Milicionari. Xhavit Spahiu formed the first club of handball, Normalisti i Prishtinës. The team established themselves as the first champion team of the country. From 1954 to 1959 they triumphed by becoming champions six times in a row. From 1981 and on because of the political situation in Kosovo, handball was in a difficult position and only recovered in 1999. They were accepted in the International Handball Federation (IHF) and European Handball Federation (EHF). The national team held matches in Bosnia, Turkey, Bulgaria and other Balkan nations. On 28 November 2001 Pristina hosted a match against Kelecolu, a Turkish team and this marked the beginning of continual friendly matches of Kosovo against other nations not only in the Balkans but as far as Great Britain, Scotland, Egypt etc.

KH Prishtina (Handball club of Pristina) with their main playing stadium in the Palace of Youth and Sport have won the Kosovo's cup in April 2013 against Vushtrri, establishing themselves as the champions of Kosovo for the fourth time. KHF Prishtina (Handball club of females in Pristina) has won ten championships in a row and are currently holding their fall championship title for 2012/13. Because of their continual successes at home, they have been qualified for the European league for the second time in their history.

Oltion Beshiri is one of the most successful handball players for Pristina's Handball Team. He has been awarded with the Athlete of the Year award for the 2013 season from the fans of the capital, Plisat. During 2008-2009 he scored 229 goals during half a season, and was also part of the Bundesliga for several months when he was 15–16 years of age.

== Volleyball ==
Volleyball in Pristina was first played in the gyms of high schools during 1936. In 1948, Pristina was the host city of the first volleyball championship, which was organized as a competition between 6 teams. Ten years later, another championship was organized and the winners, the men's team of Pristina, qualified to play in the Second Federative League in Yugoslavia. The women's team, called the University of Pristina, only made it that far after 1975. In 1991, volleyball in Pristina was no longer organised within the Yugoslavian regulations.

The men's team competed in the first tournament organised independently that year, whereas the women's team competed two years later in the first tournament organised as part of the women's league. Pristina's volleyball teams, although with changes in names and chairpersons, have competed consistently in championships organised since the sport began its independent activity in 1991 Pristina women's volleyball club are current defending champions in the 2013/2014 season. Another women's club from Pristina, University AAB won the Cup of Kosovo 2012 by beating Pristina in the final. Despite being the current best team in the women's Superleague, Pristina's team is going through financial obstacles, causing problems in organising matches in their homecourt. Pristina's Volleyball Club was elected the most successful club in the women's category for the 2012/2013 season Volleyball in Pristina continues to struggle along with the Volleyball Federation of Kosovo, considering that they are not accepted in the International Volleyball Federation and as a result, Pristina and other clubs cannot compete in international tournaments.

Shemsije Asllanaj was elected the best volleyball athlete in the women's category by the Kosovar Volleyball Federation in 2012. In this year the club she plays for, KV Prishtina won the Super Cup. She repeated the success in 2013 along with the club she plays for, KV Prishtina as they were awarded with the highest honors from the Kosovar Volleyball Federation.

== Karate ==
Karate in Pristina is played in 14 clubs, of which KK Ippon was champion of the National Championship of Karate in 2013. KK Ardhmëria, KK ASLU, KK Bardhoshi, KK Batllava, KK Fan, KK Iliria, KK Kosova, KK Kosovari, KK Përparimi, KK Prishtina, KK Sharri, KK UNSU and KK Vajzat e Dardanisë also represent Pristina in national championships and other competitions

Herolind Nishevci is a known karateka born in Pristina. He won in his Karate career two bronze medals, being the most successful Karateka for Kosovo. He won in the 2016 World Karate Championships Bronze in the +84 Category. The first medal won for Kosovo, at the World Karate Championships. Herolind also won the bronze medal at the 2021 European Karate Championships in Poreč in the same category, for Kosovo.

Herolind Nishevci
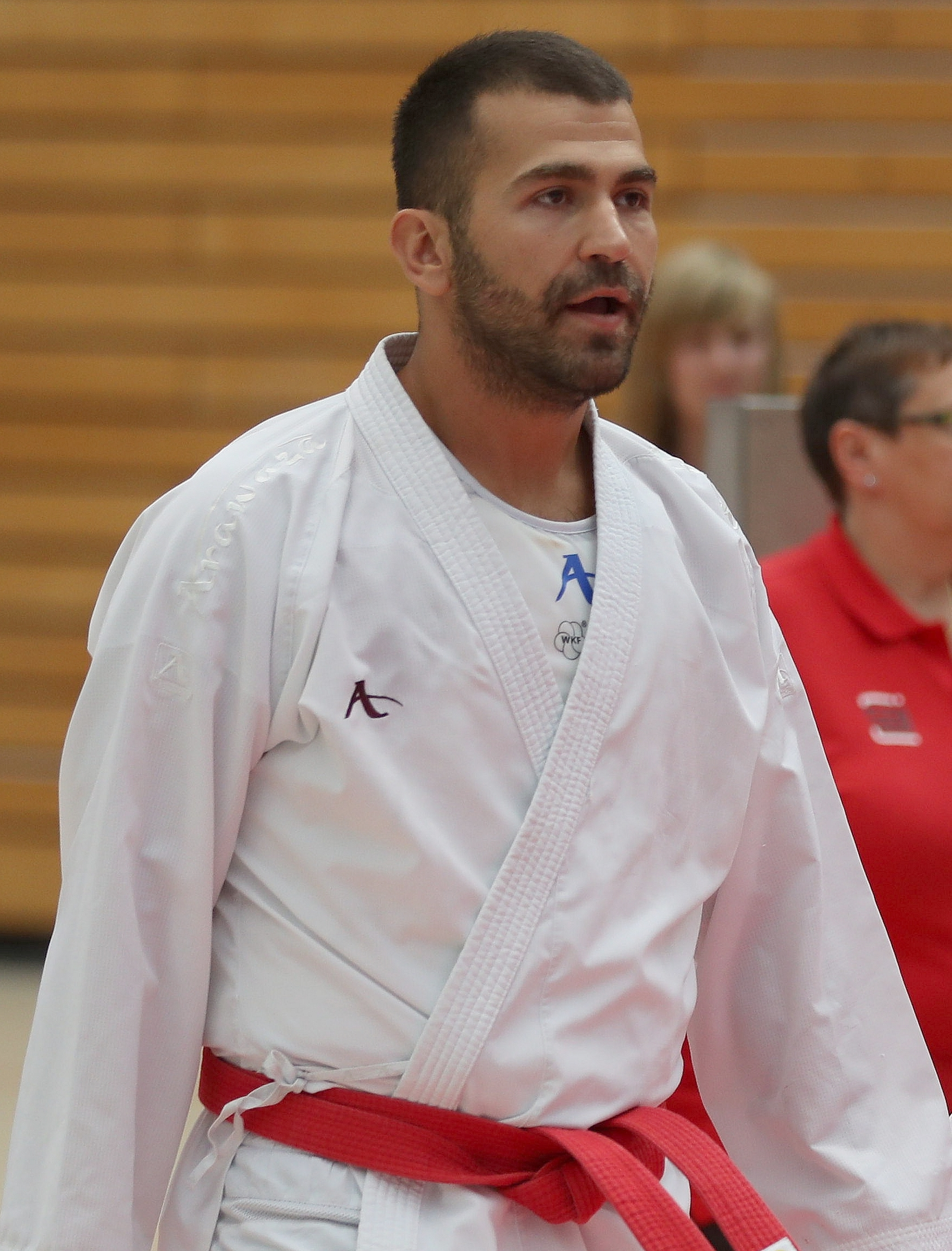
Medal record
Men's Karate
Representing Kosovo
World Championships
Bronze medal – third place	2016 Linz	+84 kg
European Championships
Bronze medal – third place	2021 Poreč	+84 kg

== Supporters ==
Plisat
- Founded: 1987; 39 years ago
- Type: Plisat
- Location: Pristina, Kosovo
- Arena: Fadil Vokrri Stadium
- Stand: East (1987–2019); South (2019–present)

Plisat is a well known fan club in Kosovo and in the Albanian speaking area such as in Albania and North Macedonia. They support the Albania national football team in their home and away games.

This fan club was founded in 1987 by the supporters of FC Prishtina. They got their name from the traditional Albanian cap called Plis. Usually, the members of Plisat stay in the east stand of the Prishtina City Stadium while supporting their team in football.

They are popularly known as "the 12th player" of FC Prishtina because of the massive support they provide during the games – no matter if losing or winning. In the early 1980s they made notable travels to Čačak, but particularly notable was when, in 1983, more than 7000 supporters followed FC Prishtina to the Marakana stadium in Belgrade in the club's historical 1–3 victory over Red Star Belgrade at-the-time strong Yugoslav First League.

In addition to supporting the football team, after the Kosovo War Plisat also began supporting the basketball team, KB Prishtina, and the handball team, KH Prishtina. They developed a distinctive style of support, including coordinated chants and choreographed displays in stadium stands. Plisat are among the most prominent fan groups in Kosovo.

== Infrastructure ==
The Stadium of Pristina is the home ground of FC Prishtina since 17 May 1953. Nowadays, due to renovations, the capacity of the stadium is 16,200 seats.

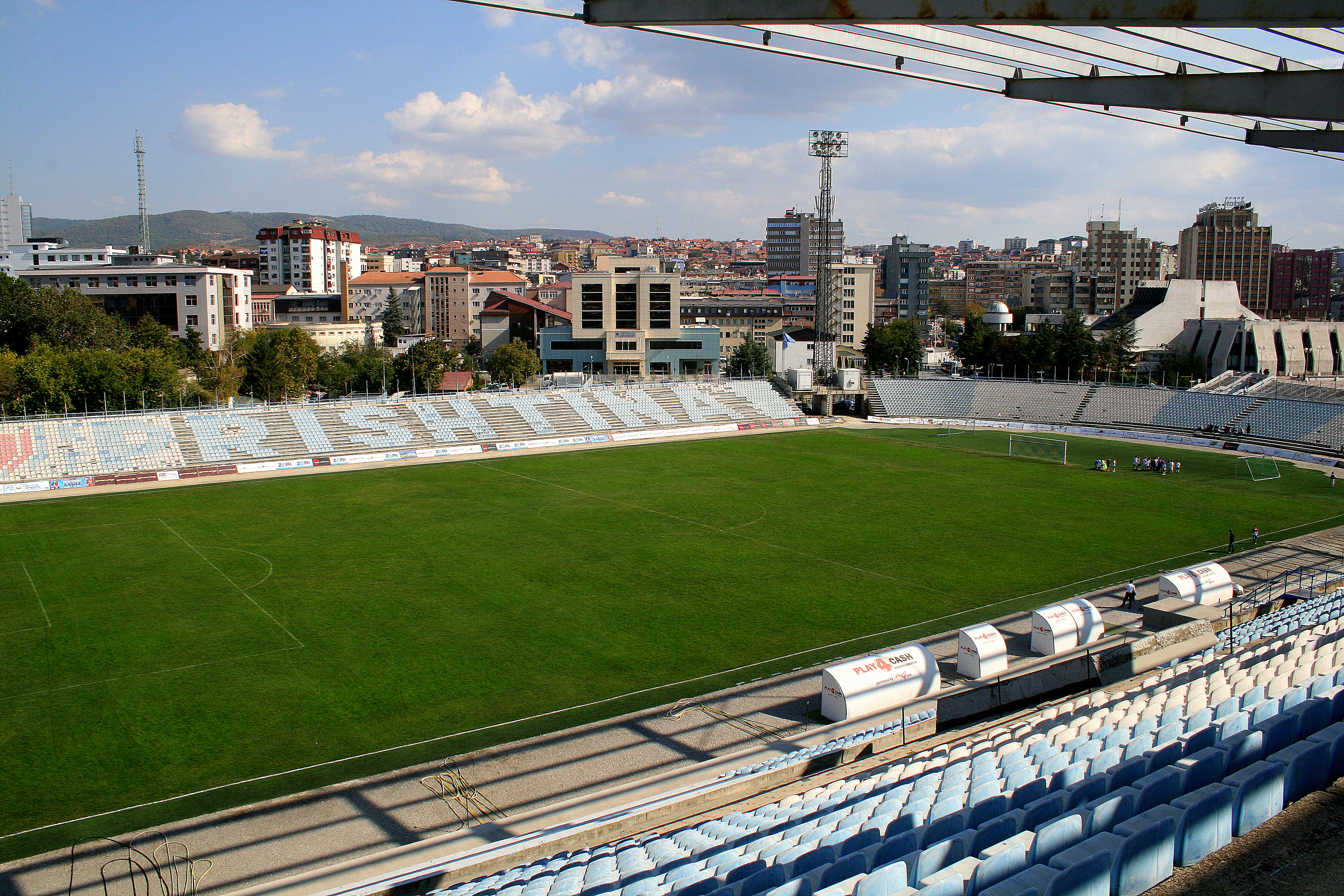
The Stadium of Pristina

Apart from inserting new seats which were a donation from Football Federation of Sweden, the stadium has also been subject to a number of other architectural interventions, including a rooftop in the western wing which would enable spectators shelter during rain, and a fence in the north-eastern wing. The Youth Palace which is located in the centre of Pristina, is the home of many sports played indoors in the city including basketball, volleyball, table tennis and futsal. The Palace constructed in 1977 was financed from the voluntary contributions of the citizens of Pristina. Its first director was Kemajl Hashimi, while from 2008 and on this institution is under the management of the Kosovar Agency of Privatization. The Youth Palace has an area of 8136 m2. During the year of 2013, Sigal Prishtina has invested in the renovation of the Palace in order to get prepared for the matches against the teams of Balkan League in Basketball. Another football stadium located in Pristina is the Stadium of Flamurtari, which is home ground to Flamurtari Football Club and Kosova e Prishtinës Football Club. This stadium has a capacity of 2000 seats. Pristina possesses outdoor tennis courts where Pristina Tennis Club and DielliX Tennis Club operate their activity. These two hard surface courts are also equipped with proper lightning that enable play during night. Two of the biggest tournaments organised in Kosovo take place in these courts, Pristina Open and Dielli Open. Apart from tournaments, Pristina's tennis grounds have also been utilized for junior tennis camps organized by Pristina Tennis Club. The sport infrastructure is an issue of current debate. The reasons for the lack of or poor quality of Pristina's sport venues include the consequences of the last war (1999), the lack of investments in the past 25–30 years, and the difficult economic situation of the country.

== Other sports ==
Table tennis is another active sport in Pristina, since the acceptance of the Kosovar Table Tennis Federation in the International Table Tennis Federation in 2003. Two players from the KP Prishtina (Table-tennis Club Pristina), Vlona Maloku and Linor Çitaku were elected table tennis players of the year 2013, following their acclaimed titles and placement on top of the national ranking table. Maloku is a member of Kosovo's national table tennis women's team and participated in the European Table Tennis Championship in Vienna, whereas Çitaku is a regular member of Kosovo's national table tennis men's team and participated in the World Table Tennis Championship in Paris 2013, European Table Tennis Championship in Vienna and Balkan's U21 Table Tennis Championship in Sarajevo

Tennis in Pristina is represented by two tennis clubs, KT Prishtina and KT DielliX. They both practice their activity in the tennis courts located near the Ismail Qemali secondary school KT Prishtina was founded in 1992 and is the first tennis club in Kosovo. Current director is Agim Islami, and the club consists of 230 members, more than half of them being women. Apart from local tennis players, there are circa 30 international players who play under this club. 22 local male tennis players compete in national tournaments, five of whom are in the top ten. In the women's category, there are four active players. KT DielliX was founded in 1997 and is the main organizer of the traditional tennis tournament in Pristina, Dielli Open.

There are four swimming clubs in Pristina, KN Step, KN Scan Color, KN Prishtina, KN Nemo OP, and all four of them have been awarded year ending prizes by the Kosovo Swimming Federation in 2013

Rita Zeqiri from KN Step Prishtina was elected the best swimmer of the year for 2013, a prize this she won for the fourth time in a row. In 2012 she triumphed as a champion of Kosovo in 10 seniors' disciplines and won 21 international medals, 20 of which were gold. In the men's category, Lum Zhaveli from KN Step Prishtina was the best swimmer of 2013, after winning 4 international medals, 2 of which golden and breaking many national swimming records.

Shooting as a sport began in 1948 in Pristina. Nowadays it is practised by four clubs: Dardania, Hajvalia, Polici and Zenel Hajdini, and all four of them operate in the Youth Palace of Pristina.

== Sport in education ==
Sport in education is considered as necessary for a proper physical and psychological development of children and as means of improving the overall quality of sport in the country. According to the regulations from the Ministry of Education, Science and Technology, Physical Education is a mandatory class for which students of primary and high schools must attend 2 teaching hours during a week, 74 in total for the Academic Year. For students with special needs or others with particular talents, special treatment is required which involves activities up to five times a week. . The Program contains learning on sports theory, athletics, gymnastics, collective sports, individual sports (swimming, combative sports, racquet sports), and competitions in at least two sports.

The books used for the programs are :

Book	Author
Edukata fizike për klasën V-VI	Hasangjekaj, B., Puka, J
Edukata fizike për klasën VII-VIII	Hasangjekaj, B., Puka, J
Edukata fizike për kl. – I dhe II të AMO	Hasangjekaj, B, Gjnolli E, Rakovica H, Puka, J, Nixha M dhe Allajbegu M.
