= Teófilo Stevenson =

Cuban amateur boxer (1952–2012)

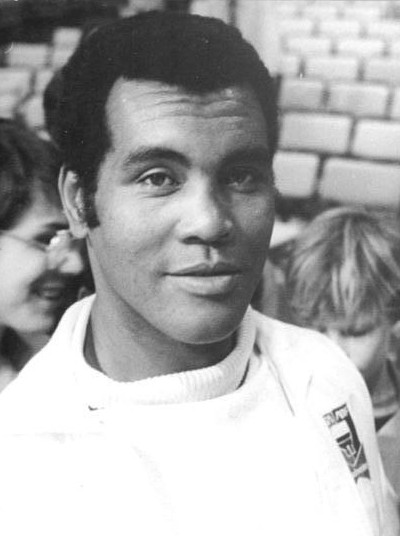
- Stevenson in 1985

Personal information
- Nickname: Pirolo
- Born: Teófilo Stevenson Lawrence; 29 March 1952 Puerto Padre, Las Tunas, Cuba
- Died: 11 June 2012 (aged 60) Havana, Cuba
- Height: 6 ft 5 in (196 cm)
- Weight: Heavyweight

Boxing career
- Reach: 78 in (198 cm)
- Stance: Orthodox

Boxing record
- Total fights: 332
- Wins: 302
- Losses: 22
- Draws: 8
Medal record
Men's boxing
Representing Cuba
Event	1st	2nd	3rd
Olympic Games	3	0	0
Friendship Games	1	0	0
World Championships	3	0	0
Pan American Games	2	0	1
Central American and Caribbean Games	2	0	0
Central American Championships	6	0	0
Total	17	0	1
Olympic Games
Gold medal – first place	1972 Munich	Heavyweight
Gold medal – first place	1976 Montreal	Heavyweight
Gold medal – first place	1980 Moscow	Heavyweight
Friendship Games
Gold medal – first place	1984 Havana	Super Heavyweight
World Championships
Gold medal – first place	1974 Havana	Heavyweight
Gold medal – first place	1978 Belgrade	Heavyweight
Gold medal – first place	1986 Reno	Super Heavyweight
Pan American Games
Gold medal – first place	1975 Mexico City	Heavyweight
Gold medal – first place	1979 San Juan	Heavyweight
Bronze medal – third place	1971 Cali	Heavyweight
Central American and Caribbean Games
Gold medal – first place	1974 Santo Domingo	Heavyweight
Gold medal – first place	1982 Havana	Super Heavyweight
Central America and the Caribbean Championships
Gold medal – first place	1970 Havana	Heavyweight
Gold medal – first place	1971 San Juan	Heavyweight
Gold medal – first place	1972 San José	Heavyweight
Gold medal – first place	1973 Mexico City	Heavyweight
Gold medal – first place	1974 Caracas	Heavyweight
Gold medal – first place	1977 Panama City	Heavyweight

Teófilo Stevenson Lawrence (Spanish pronunciation: [teˈofilo steˈβenson]; 29 March 1952 – 11 June 2012) was a Cuban amateur boxer who competed from 1966 to 1986.

Stevenson won the Val Barker Trophy (1972) as well was honored with the Olympic Order (1987) and is one of only three boxers to win three Olympic gold medals – alongside the Hungarian László Papp and the fellow Cuban Félix Savón.

== Early life ==
Teófilo Stevenson Lawrence was born in Puerto Padre, Cuba. His father, Teófilo Stevenson Patterson, was an immigrant from Saint Vincent. His mother Dolores Lawrence was a native Cuban, but her parents were immigrants from the Anglophone island of Saint Kitts. Teófilo senior arrived in Cuba in 1923, finding work wherever he could, before settling in Camagüey with Dolores, where he gave English lessons to top up his meagre earnings. Due to his large size, Teófilo senior was encouraged into boxing by local trainers, fighting seven times before becoming disillusioned by the corrupt payment structure on offer to young fighters.

Teófilo junior was a bright child who at nine years old soon found himself sparring at the makeshift open-air gym his father had frequented. Under the tutelage of former national light heavyweight champion John Herrera, Teófilo junior began his career fighting far more experienced boxers, but according to Herrera, "had what it took". Despite his growing involvement in the sport, Stevenson had yet to tell his mother about his activities. Eventually Teófilo Sr. broke the news to his wife, who was furious; but she agreed to acquiesce on the provision that the boy was accompanied by his father.

== Boxing career ==
=== Beginnings ===
The young Stevenson continued to improve under Herrera in the mid-1960s, winning a junior title and gaining additional training in Havana. His victories drew the attention of Andrei Chervonenko, a head coach in Cuba's newly implemented state sports system. Professional sports throughout the island had been outlawed since 1962 by government resolution 83-A, and all boxing activity had come under the guidance of the government sponsored National Boxing Commission. Chervonenko, a retired boxer himself, sent by the Soviet Union, who had created Cuba's Escuela de Boxeo (Boxing school) in a derelict old gym in Havana, began to champion Stevenson's progress.

Stevenson's senior boxing career began at age seventeen with a defeat in the national championships against the experienced heavyweight Gabriel Garcia. Despite the setback, Stevenson went on to register convincing victories over Nancio Carrillo and Juan Perez, two of Cuba's finest boxers in the weight division, securing a place in the national team for the 1970 Central American and Caribbean Boxing Championships. Defeat in the final after three victories was considered no shame, and Stevenson firmly established himself as Cuba's premier heavyweight. Back in the gym Chervonenko and leading Cuban boxing coach Alcides Sagarra worked on Stevenson's jab, which became his ultimate weapon, and paid dividends when the Cuban easily defeated East Germany's Bernd Anders in front of a surprised Berlin crowd. The victory made the entire amateur boxing world take notice of Stevenson as a serious heavyweight contender.

=== Munich Olympics 1972 ===
Stevenson, now twenty, joined the Cuban boxing team for the Munich Olympics of 1972. His opening bout against experienced Polish fighter Ludwik Denderys began dramatically when Stevenson knocked the other man down within thirty seconds of the opening bell. The fight was stopped moments later due to a large cut next to the Pole's eye.

Proceeding to the quarter finals, Stevenson met American boxer Duane Bobick. Bobick, a gold medalist at the 1971 Pan American Games, had beaten Stevenson previously. After a close first round, Stevenson lost the second, but a ferocious display in the third round knocked Bobick to the canvas three times and the contest was stopped. The victory was viewed on television throughout Cuba, and is still considered Stevenson's most memorable performance.

Stevenson easily defeated German Peter Hussing in the semifinal by TKO in the second round, and received his gold medal after Romanian Ion Alexe failed to appear in the final due to injury. The Cuban boxing team won three gold medals, their first in Olympic boxing history, as well as one silver and one bronze. The Munich games established Cuba's dominance over the amateur sport that was to last decades. It also established Stevenson as the world's premier amateur heavyweight boxer.

Less than two years after his successful performance at the Munich Olympics, Stevenson, then 22-years-old, was rewarded with a house for himself in Havana and another for himself and his family in Delicias. Stevenson later recalled: "I had no idea the house in Delicias was going to be so big. When I was shown the plans, I said, 'What is this? A bunker?'" AIBA president Anwar Chowdhry, when asked did the Cuban authorities acted properly in giving Stevenson two houses and two cars, said: "These things should not be allowed. If gifts are to be given it should be for everybody—not for a few." Over tea in his office in Havana's Sports City Coliseum, INDER president Conrado Martínez Corona defended the local practice of giving cars and apartments to top athletes. "Our country has the obligation of solving the problems of all citizens—the problems of their nourishment, housing, education and health", he said. "It's a pity we can't solve this problem in the way we need to for everybody."

=== Prime years ===
Stevenson did the same at the inaugural 1974 World Championships in Havana, Cuba, and then in the 1976 Summer Olympics, held in Montreal, Stevenson repeated the feat once again. By then, he had become a national hero in Cuba. This was the point where he was the closest to signing a professional contract, as American fight promoters offered him US$5 million to challenge world heavyweight champion Muhammad Ali. If he had accepted, it would have made Stevenson the second boxer to go straight from the Olympics into a professional debut with the world's heavyweight crown on the line, after Pete Rademacher. Stevenson refused the offer, however, asking "What is one million dollars compared to the love of eight million Cubans?" Stevenson went to the 1980 Summer Olympics in Moscow and became the second boxer ever, after Papp, to win three Olympic boxing gold medals. The Moscow Games were the 19th occurrence of the modern Olympic Games.

Stevenson participated at the 1982 World Amateur Boxing Championships in Munich, but lost to the eventual silver medalist and future professional world champion Francesco Damiani from Italy. This fight ended an eleven-year unbeaten run by Stevenson and was the only occasion that he did not win the gold medal at the World Championships when he entered the competition.

His loss by a split decision to Aleksandr Lukstin of the Soviet Union in the finals of the 1983 Córdova Cardín, as the Soviet head coach Kontsantin Koptsev later admitted, was due to a plaster-like tape they handwrapped Lukstin's fists with instead of a regular elastic-band hand wrapping.

Stevenson might have won a fourth gold medal at the 1984 Summer Olympics, but the Soviet Union boycotted the games, which were hosted by Los Angeles, in retaliation for the American boycott of the 1980 Moscow competition. Cuba followed the Soviet lead, and Stevenson did not compete. For consolation, he beat future Olympic champion Tyrell Biggs in February 1984 (breaking three ribs in the process) and won the super heavyweight gold at the 1984 Friendship Games, defeating Ulli Kaden of East Germany and, in the final, Valeriy Abadzhyan of the Soviet Union. At the 1986 World Amateur Boxing Championships, he won the super heavyweight gold, defeating Alex Garcia from the United States in the final. Stevenson retired from boxing shortly after the 1988 Summer Olympics, which Cuba also boycotted.

=== Rivalry with Vysotsky ===
Stevenson was known for two fights with Soviet boxer Igor Vysotsky, who defeated him twice. Vysotsky later said in an interview with East Side Boxing:

I fought Teofilo twice. We first met at the "Córdova Cardín" tournament in 1973 in Cuba. I took the first two opponents, both being Cuban, out early. In the third, I beat Stevenson on points. Although the score was 3:2, the pace of the fight forced Teófilo to take two necessary breaks to retie his gloves. We had a saying in the USSR, "It's easier to win the World championships than it is to win 'Córdova Cardín'." The second time was at a class A International tournament in Minsk, in March 1976. In each stanza, Stevenson took a count, while in the final three minutes, I knocked him out.

— Igor Vysotsky, Interview with East Side Boxing, 2006

Vysotsky was the only boxer out of hundreds of Stevenson's opponents to ever stop him, let alone by knockout, and to defeat him twice, both times in his prime, without being avenged. And on top of it, Vysotsky scored his first victory over Stevenson at the Córdova Cardín, Cubans' home tournament, where they do their best to never let any foreigner get into the finals.

Stevenson's second loss to Vysotsky happened six weeks before his knockout winning streak at the 1976 Olympics in Montreal, which ended up with victories over John Tate and Mircea Șimon. After losing to Vysotsky for a second time he said, "Nobody is invincible."

=== Highlights ===
Local match-up (71 kg), Las Tunas, Cuba, October 1966 (debut):

- Lost to Luis Henríquez (Cuba) by decision

(gold) National Youth Championships (+81 kg), Camagüey, Cuba, 1968

- (no data available)

VI Playa Girón National Championships (+81 kg), Guantánamo, Cuba, November 1968:

- 1/4: Lost to Adolfo Gálvez (Cuba) by decision

(silver) VII Playa Girón National Championships (+81 kg), Nueva Gerona, Cuba, December 1969:

- 1/2: Defeated Iván Rodríguez (Cuba)
- Finals: Lost to Gabriel García (Cuba) by decision

Local match-up (+81 kg), Havana, Cuba, 1970:

- Defeated Nancio Carrillo (Cuba) KO
- Defeated Juan Pérez (Cuba)

(gold) I Central America and the Caribbean Championships (+81 kg), Havana, Cuba, September 1970:

- 1/2: Defeated Visley Zulueta (Colombia) KO 1
- Finals: Defeated Earl McClear (Bermuda) by decision

(silver) III Giraldo Córdova Cardín Tournament (+81 kg), Havana, Cuba, October 1970:

- 1/4: Defeated Gabriel García (Cuba) RSC 3
- 1/2: Defeated Adolfo Gálvez (Cuba) by decision
- Finals: Lost to Bernd Anders (East Germany) by decision

(gold) VI Friendship Youth Tournament (+81 kg), Vidin, Bulgaria, October 1970:

- 1/4: Defeated Eckhard Findeisen (East Germany) RSC 1
- 1/2: Defeated Dumitru Zelinta (Romania) RSC 2
- Finals: Defeated Vladimir Saprykin (Soviet Union) RSC 1

Cuba–Czechoslovakia Duals (+81 kg), Havana, Cuba, March 1971:

- Lost to Peter Sommer (Czechoslovakia) by decision

Czechoslovakia–Cuba Duals (+81 kg), Prague, Czechoslovakia, March 1971:

- Lost to Peter Sommer (Czechoslovakia) by decision

Yugoslavia–Cuba Duals (+81 kg), Titograd, Yugoslavia, April 1971:

- Defeated Iordan Obradović (Yugoslavia) DQ 3

Austria–Cuba Duals (+81 kg), Vienna, Austria, May 1971:

- Defeated Erwin Suppik (Austria) KO 2

(gold) IV Giraldo Córdova Cardín Tournament (+81 kg), Havana, Cuba, June 1971:

- 1/2: Defeated Adolfo Gálvez (Cuba) RET
- Finals: Defeated José Luis Cabrera (Cuba) by decision

Panama–Cuba Duals (+81 kg), Panama City, Panama, June 1971:

- Defeated Rolando Tey (Panama) RET

Cuba–Bulgaria Duals (+81 kg), Havana, Cuba, July 1971:

- Defeated Borislav Krastev (Bulgaria) DQ 2

(bronze) Pan American Games (+81 kg), Cali, Colombia, August 1971:

- 1/4: Defeated Pablo Sarmiento (Argentina) by unanimous decision, 5–0
- 1/2: Lost to Duane Bobick (United States) by unanimous decision, 0–5

Local match-up (+81 kg), Havana, Cuba, September 1971:

- Defeated Adolfo Gálvez (Cuba) RSC

(gold) III TSC Tournament (+81 kg), Berlin, East Germany, October 1971:

- 1/4: Defeated Jerzy Skoczek (Poland) KO 3
- 1/2: Defeated Bernd Anders (East Germany) RSC 3
- Finals: Defeated Josef Motýl (Czechoslovakia) RSC 1

Cuba–USSR Duals (+81 kg), Berlin, East Germany, October 1971:

- Lost to Yuri Nesterov (Soviet Union) by decision

IX Playa Girón National Championships (+81 kg), Nueva Gerona, Cuba, October–November 1971 (no medal awarded):

- 1/4: Defeated Francisco Molina (Cuba) KO
- 1/2: Defeated Adolfo Gálvez (Cuba) by decision
- Finals: Defeated Luis Valier (Cuba) RSC

(gold) II Central America and the Caribbean Championships (+81 kg), San Juan, Puerto Rico, November 1971:

- Finals: Defeated Georgie Clemente (Puerto Rico) by walkover

(gold) VII Friendship Youth Tournament (+81 kg), Havana, Cuba, December 1971:

- 1/2: Defeated Borimir Kristiev (Bulgaria) RSC
- Finals: Defeated Vladimir Volkov (Soviet Union) by decision

Cuba–USSR Duals (+81 kg), Havana, Cuba, January 1972:

- Defeated Vladimir Volkov (Soviet Union)

(gold) X Playa Girón National Championships (+81 kg), Santiago de Cuba, Cuba, February–March 1972:

- 1/2: Defeated Francisco Molina (Cuba) KO
- Finals: Defeated Luis Valier (Cuba) KO 1

Cuba–Romania Duals (+81 kg), Havana, Cuba, April 1972:

- Defeated Ion Alexe (Romania) by decision

Czechoslovakia–Cuba Duals (+81 kg), Ústí nad Labem, Czechoslovakia, April 1972:

- Defeated Josef Motýl (Czechoslovakia) KO 2

GDR–Cuba Duals (+81 kg), Berlin, East Germany, 1972:

- Defeated Bernd Anders (East Germany) KO 2

(gold) III Chemistry Cup (+81 kg), Halle, East Germany, May 1972:

- 1/4: Defeated Dieter Limant (East Germany) RSC 1
- 1/2: Defeated Eberhard Findeisen (East Germany) RSC 1
- Finals: Defeated Jürgen Fanghänel (East Germany)

Local match-up (+81 kg), Havana, Cuba, May 1972:

- Defeated Nancio Carrillo (Cuba) KO

(gold) V Giraldo Córdova Cardín Tournament (+81 kg), Havana, Cuba, July 1972:

- Finals: Defeated Nancio Carrillo (Cuba) by decision

(gold) XX Summer Olympics (+81 kg), Munich, West Germany, September 1972:

- 1/16: Defeated Ludwik Denderys (Poland) KO 1
- 1/4: Defeated Duane Bobick (United States) RSC 3 (Bobick knocked down twice in the 3rd rd)
- 1/2: Defeated Peter Hussing (West Germany) RSC 2 (Hussing knocked down twice in the 2nd rd)
- Finals: Defeated Ion Alexe (Romania) by walkover

(gold) III Central America and the Caribbean Championships (+81 kg), San José, Costa Rica, November 1972:

- 1/2: Defeated Jack Powell (Jamaica) RET 1
- Finals: Defeated Rafael Vega (Costa Rica) RSC 1

(gold) XI Playa Girón National Championships (+81 kg), Havana, Cuba, February 1973:

- Finals: Defeated Nancio Carrillo (Cuba)

(gold) Golden Belt Tournament (+81 kg), Bucharest, Romania, April 1973:

- 1/4: Defeated Hennie Thoonen (Netherlands) RET 2
- 1/2: Defeated Ion Sanatescu (Romania) by decision
- Finals: Defeated Ion Alexe (Romania) RET 2

(silver) VI Giraldo Córdova Cardín Tournament (+81 kg), Santiago de Cuba, Cuba, July 1973:

- 1/4: Defeated Nancio Carrillo (Cuba) RET
- 1/2: Defeated Peter Sommer (Czechoslovakia) KO 1
- Finals: Lost to Igor Vysotsky (Soviet Union) by split decision, 2–3

(gold) IV Central America and the Caribbean Championships (+81 kg), Mexico City, Mexico, November 1973:

- 1/4: Defeated Jimmy Russell (Jamaica) by walkover
- 1/2: Defeated Carlos Rivera (Venezuela) RSC 1
- Finals: Defeated Ismael Ruiz (Mexico) KO 1

(gold) XII Playa Girón National Championships (+81 kg), Havana, Cuba, January 1974:

- 1/8: Defeated Roberto Taylor (Cuba) by decision
- 1/4: Defeated Nancio Carrillo (Cuba) by decision
- 1/2: Defeated Jesús Benítez (Cuba) RET
- Finals: Defeated José Luis Cabrera (Cuba) RET

(gold) 1974 Central American and Caribbean Games (+81 kg), Santo Domingo, Dominican Republic, March 1974:

- 1/2: Defeated Rafael Vega (Costa Rica) KO 1
- Finals: Defeated Carlos Rivera (Venezuela) RET 1

(gold) Golden Belt Tournament (+81 kg), Bucharest, Romania, May 1974:

- 1/4: Defeated Marian Alexandru (Romania) RET 3
- 1/2: Defeated Ion Anghel (Romania) KO 2
- Finals: Defeated Yevgeni Gorstkov (Soviet Union) by walkover

(gold) VII Giraldo Córdova Cardín Tournament (+81 kg), Camagüey, Cuba, July 1974:

- 1/4: Defeated Elpidio Valier (Cuba) RSC
- 1/2: Defeated Roberto Taylor (Cuba) RSC
- Finals: Defeated Pyotr Zayev (Soviet Union) RSC

(gold) World Championships (+81 kg), Havana, Cuba, August 1974:

- 1/8: Defeated Tshibangu Hweia (Zaire) by walkover
- 1/4: Defeated Peter Hussing (West Germany) KO 1
- 1/2: Defeated Fatai Avinia (Nigeria) by decision
- Finals: Defeated Marvin Stinson (United States) by unanimous decision, 5–0

(gold) V Central America and the Caribbean Championships (+81 kg), Caracas, Venezuela, December 1974:

- 1/2: Defeated Rafael Vega (Costa Rica) by decision
- Finals: Defeated Carlos Rivera (Venezuela) by decision

XIII Playa Girón National Championships (+81 kg), Santiago de Cuba, Cuba, January 1975:

- 1/8: Defeated Germán Duvergel (Cuba) by walkover
- 1/4: Defeated José Luis Cabrera (Cuba) by decision
- 1/2: Lost to Adolfo Gálvez (Cuba) by walkover

INDER Anniversary Festival (+81 kg), Havana, Cuba, February 1975:

- Defeated Ángel Milián Rivero (Cuba) by unanimous decision, 5–0

(gold) XV Honvéd Cup (+81 kg), Budapest, Hungary, March 1975:

- 1/4: Defeated István Edocs (Hungary) by decision
- 1/2: Defeated Igor Kykotoorov ? (Soviet Union) by walkover
- Finals: Defeated Gennady Kokurin (Soviet Union) RSC 1

(gold) Golden Belt Tournament (+81 kg), Bucharest, Romania, April 1975:

- 1/4: Defeated Claudio Liendo (Venezuela) by walkover
- 1/2: Defeated Ilie Dascălu (Romania) RET 1
- Finals: Defeated Mircea Șimon (Romania) by walkover

(gold) VIII Giraldo Córdova Cardín Tournament (+81 kg), Las Villas, Cuba, July 1975:

- 1/2: Defeated Ricardo Casañas (Cuba) RSC 2
- Finals: Defeated Dietmar Meyer (East Germany) RET 2

(gold) Pan American Games (+81 kg), Mexico City, Mexico, October 1975:

- 1/8: Defeated Gilberto Acuña (Costa Rica) RSC 1
- 1/4: Defeated Clarence Hill (Bermuda) by walkover
- 1/2: Defeated Jair De Campos (Brazil) RSC 1 (2:01)
- Finals: Defeated Michael Dokes (United States) by unanimous decision, 5–0

Local match-up (+81 kg), Havana, Cuba, December 1975:

- Defeated David Villa (Cuba) RSC

(gold) XIV Playa Girón National Championships (+81 kg), Camagüey, Cuba, January 1976:

- 1/8: Defeated Ramón Lores (Cuba) RSC
- 1/4: Defeated José Luis Cabrera (Cuba) by walkover
- 1/2: Defeated Glemond Crawford (Cuba) RET
- Finals: Defeated Julio Cañizares (Cuba) RSC

Jamaica–Cuba Duals (+81 kg), Kingston, Jamaica, February 1976:

- Defeated ? by decision

(silver) Usov Memorial Tournament (+81 kg), Minsk, Belarus SSR, April 1976:

- 1/4: Defeated Leonid Zadorozhny (Soviet Union) RSCI 1
- 1/2: Defeated Nikolay Malykh (Soviet Union) RET 3
- Finals: Lost to Igor Vysotsky (Soviet Union) KO 3

(gold) IX Giraldo Córdova Cardín Tournament (+81 kg), Pinar del Río, Cuba, May 1976:

- 1/8: Defeated Fidel César (Cuba) KO 2
- 1/4: Defeated José Ribalta (Cuba) RSC 1
- 1/2: Defeated Roberto Taylor (Cuba) RSC 1
- Finals: Defeated Ángel Milián Rivero (Cuba) by unanimous decision, 5–0

(gold) XXI Summer Olympics (+81 kg), Maurice Richard Arena, Montreal, Canada, July 1976:

- 1/16: Defeated Mamadou Drame (Senegal) KO 2
- 1/4: Defeated Pekka Ruokola (Finland) RSC 1
- 1/2: Defeated John Tate (United States) KO 1 (1:36)
- Finals: Defeated Mircea Șimon (Romania) RET 3 (2:35)

Local match-up (+81 kg), Havana, Cuba, February 1977:

- Defeated Luis Martínez (Cuba) KO

Local match-up (+81 kg), Camagüey, Cuba, April 1977:

- Defeated Roberto Taylor (Cuba) by decision

Local match-up (+81 kg), Matanzas, Cuba, April 1977:

- Defeated Roberto Gómez (Cuba) by decision

Local match-up (+81 kg), Bayamo, Cuba, April 1977:

- Defeated Juan Pérez (Cuba) KO

(gold) I Battle of Carabobo International Tournament (+81 kg), Caracas, Venezuela, June 1977:

- Finals: Defeated Woody Clark (United States) KO 3

(gold) X Giraldo Córdova Cardín Tournament (+81 kg), Matanzas, Cuba, July 1977:

- 1/8: Defeated Roberto Taylor (Cuba) RSC
- 1/4: Defeated Julio Quintero (Cuba) RSC
- 1/2: Defeated Fidel César (Cuba) by decision
- Finals: Defeated Roberto Gómez (Cuba) RET 3

(gold) VIII Central America and the Caribbean Championships (+81 kg), Panama City, Panama, August 1977:

- 1/4: Defeated José Ángel Castro (Venezuela) by unanimous decision, 5–0
- 1/2: Defeated Mauricio Realajeno (El Salvador) KO 1
- Finals: Defeated Rafael Vega (Costa Rica) by walkover

(gold) XVI Playa Girón National Championships (+81 kg), Camagüey, Cuba, January 1978:

- 1/16: Defeated Roberto Taylor (Cuba) RSC 1
- 1/8: Defeated Oscar Rodríguez (Cuba) RSC
- 1/4: Defeated Ramón Lores (Cuba) RSC
- 1/2: Defeated Noel Grenot (Cuba) RSC
- Finals: Defeated Ángel Milián Rivero (Cuba) RSC 2

Cuba–USA Duals (+81 kg), Havana, Cuba, February 1978:

- Defeated Jimmy Clark (United States) by split decision, 2–1

(gold) XXIX Strandzha Cup (+81 kg), Sofia, Bulgaria, March 1978:

- 1/4: Defeated Hans Müller (East Germany) KO 1
- 1/2: Defeated Georgi Lefterov (Bulgaria) by walkover
- Finals: Defeated Georgi Stoimenov (Bulgaria) RSC 3

(gold) Golden Belt Tournament (+81 kg), Bucharest, Romania, March 1978:

- 1/4: Defeated Gheorghe Axente (Romania) RET 1
- 1/2: Defeated Petre Ungureanu (Romania) by walkover
- Finals: Defeated Ion Cernat (Romania) RSC 1

(gold) XI Giraldo Córdova Cardín Tournament (+81 kg), Cienfuegos, Cuba, April 1978:

- 1/4: Defeated Ricardo Avilés (Cuba) RSC
- 1/2: Defeated Glemond Crawford (Cuba) RET 3
- Finals: Defeated Ángel Milián Rivero (Cuba) KO 2

(gold) World Championships (+81 kg), Belgrade, Yugoslavia, May 1978:

- 1/8: Defeated Adama Mensah (Ghana) KO 1
- 1/4: Defeated Tony Tubbs (United States) by unanimous decision, 5–0
- 1/2: Defeated Carlos Rivera (Venezuela) KO 2
- Finals: Defeated Dragomir Vujković (Yugoslavia) RET 1

National Team Championships (+81 kg), Havana, Cuba, September 1978:

- Defeated Fidel César (Cuba) by decision

USA–Cuba Duals (+81 kg), Madison Square Garden, New York City, October 1978:

- Defeated Jimmy Clark (United States) RSC 1

(gold) XVII Playa Girón National Championships (+81 kg), Guantánamo, Cuba, January 1979:

- 1/8: Defeated Ramón Lores (Cuba) RSC
- 1/4: Defeated Eliécer Silé (Cuba) RET
- 1/2: Defeated Rolando Herrera (Cuba) RSC
- Finals: Held Ángel Milián Rivero (Cuba) to a draw

Cuba–USA Duals (+81 kg), Coliseo de la Ciudad Deportiva, Havana, Cuba, February 1979:

- Defeated Phillip Brown (United States) by unanimous decision, 3–0 (Brown knocked down at 1:19 of the 3rd rd)

(gold) VIII Chemistry Cup (+81 kg), Halle, East Germany, March 1979:

- 1/4: Defeated Lakhdar Kaddour (Algeria) RSC 1
- 1/2: Defeated Werner Kohnert (East Germany) by split decision, 3–2
- Finals: Defeated Jürgen Fanghänel (East Germany) by split decision, 3–2

(gold) Golden Belt Tournament (+81 kg), Bucharest, Romania, March 1979:

- Finals: Defeated Peter Hussing (West Germany) by walkover

(gold) XII Giraldo Córdova Cardín Tournament (+81 kg), Havana, Cuba, May 1979:

- 1/8: Defeated Lázaro Figueras (Cuba) RSC
- 1/4: Defeated Marcos Díaz (Cuba) RSC
- 1/2: Defeated Božidar Cvetić (Yugoslavia) by walkover
- Finals: Defeated Ángel Milián Rivero (Cuba) by majority decision, 4–1

(gold) VIII Pan American Games (+81 kg), Roberto Clemente Coliseum, San Juan, Puerto Rico, July 1979:

- 1/2: Defeated Rufus Hadley (United States) KO 1 (1:39)
- Finals: Defeated Narciso Maldonado (Puerto Rico) RSC 1 (2:18)

National Team Championships (+81 kg), Puerto Padre, Cuba, September 1979:

- Defeated Roberto Taylor (Cuba) KO
- Defeated Rafael Lugo (Cuba) RSC
- Defeated Armando Lowí (Cuba) RSC

(gold) XVIII Playa Girón National Championships (+81 kg), Pinar del Río, Cuba, January 1980:

- 1/4: Defeated Luis Martínez (Cuba) RSC
- 1/2: Defeated Roberto Gómez (Cuba) KO
- Finals: Held Ángel Milián Rivero (Cuba) to a draw

USA–Cuba Duals (+81 kg), Charlotte Coliseum, Charlotte, North Carolina, February 1980:

- Defeated Jimmy Clark (United States) by split decision, 2–1 (Clark was given a standing eight count at 2:12 of the 1st rd; Clark knocked down at 1:55 of the 3rd rd; Cuban referee Romelio Santiago repeatedly issued warnings for lunging to Clark)

(gold) XI Ústí nad Labem Grand Prix (+81 kg) Ústí nad Labem, Czechoslovakia, April 1980:

- 1/2: Defeated Czesław Dawiec (Poland) RET 1
- Finals: Defeated Ulli Kaden (East Germany) RSC 2

(gold) XX Honvéd Cup (+81 kg), Budapest, Hungary, April 1980:

- 1/4: Defeated Nikolay Timkin (Soviet Union) KO 1
- 1/2: Defeated Ferenc Somodi (Hungary) KO 2
- Finals: Defeated István Lévai (Hungary) KO 3

(silver) XIII Giraldo Córdova Cardín Tournament (+81 kg), Holguín, Cuba, May–June 1980:

- 1/4: Defeated Rolando Herrera (Cuba) RSC
- 1/2: Defeated Lázaro Figueras (Cuba) by decision
- Finals: Lost to Ángel Milián Rivero (Cuba) by walkover

(gold) XXII Summer Olympics (+81 kg), Moscow, Soviet Union, July–August 1980:

- 1/16: Defeated Solomon Ataga (Nigeria) KO 1
- 1/4: Defeated Grzegorz Skrzecz (Poland) KO 3 (2:12)
- 1/2: Defeated István Lévai (Hungary) by unanimous decision, 5–0
- Finals: Defeated Pyotr Zayev (Soviet Union) by majority decision, 4–1

(gold) XIX Playa Girón National Championships (+91 kg), Matanzas, Cuba, January–February 1981:

- 1/8: Defeated Hermes Córdova (Cuba) by walkover
- 1/4: Defeated Rolando Herrera (Cuba) RSC
- 1/2: Held Ángel Milián Rivero (Cuba) to a draw
- Finals: Defeated Roberto Taylor (Cuba) by walkover

Local match-up (+91 kg), San José, Cuba, June 1981:

- Defeated Jorge Luis González (Cuba) by decision

(gold) XX Playa Girón National Championships (+91 kg), Cienfuegos, Cuba, January 1982:

- 1/4: Defeated Luis Palmar (Cuba) KO
- 1/2: Defeated Fidel César (Cuba) KO
- Finals: Held Ángel Milián Rivero (Cuba) to a draw

(silver) XI Chemistry Cup (+91 kg), Halle, East Germany, March 1982:

- 1/2: Defeated Dietmar Mayer (East Germany) RSC 1
- Finals: Lost to Ulli Kaden (East Germany) DQ 1

(gold) XV Giraldo Córdova Cardín Tournament (+91 kg), Guantánamo, Cuba, May 1982:

- 1/8: Defeated Orlando Ruíz (Cuba) RSC
- 1/4: Defeated Aleksandr Oreshkin (Soviet Union) RET 2
- 1/2: Defeated Horacio Navia Ruíz (Cuba) RET 2
- Finals: Defeated Sergey Kirilitsyn (Soviet Union) by unanimous decision, 5–0

World Championships (+91 kg), Munich, West Germany, May 1982:

- 1/4: Lost to Francesco Damiani (Italy) by unanimous decision, 0–5

(gold) XIV Central American and Caribbean Games (+91 kg), Havana, Cuba, August 1982:

- 1/2: Defeated Nelson Rosas (Puerto Rico) KO 1
- Finals: Defeated James Parson (United States Virgin Islands) RET 1

USA–Cuba Duals (+91 kg), Sparks Convention Center, Reno, Nevada, November 1982:

- Defeated Tyrell Biggs (United States) KO 2 (2:59)

XXI Playa Girón National Championships (+91 kg), Las Tunas, Cuba, January 1983:

- 1/4: Lost to Jorge Luis González (Cuba) by decision

Cuba–GDR Duals (+91 kg), n. a., 1983:

- Lost to Ulli Kaden (East Germany) by decision

(silver) XVI Giraldo Córdova Cardín Tournament (+91 kg), Santiago de Cuba, Cuba, August 1983:

- 1/2: Defeated Epifanio Estrada (Cuba) by decision
- Finals: Lost to Aleksandr Lukstin (Soviet Union) by split decision, 2–3

(bronze) North American Championships (+91 kg), Houston, Texas, September 1983:

- 1/2: Lost to Craig Payne (United States) by split decision, 2–3

(gold) XXII Playa Girón National Championships (+91 kg), Manzanillo, Cuba, January 1984:

- Finals: Defeated Félix Lemus (Cuba) by decision

USA–Cuba Duals (+91 kg), Sparks Convention Center, Reno, Nevada, February 1984:

- Defeated Tyrell Biggs (United States) by split decision, 3–2 (Biggs knocked down at 2:05 of the 3rd rd; Biggs suffered three ribs broken)

(gold) XIII Chemistry Cup (+91 kg), Halle, East Germany, March–April 1984:

- 1/4: Defeated Olaf Walther (East Germany) KO 2
- 1/2: Defeated Pyotr Skok (Soviet Union) RSC 1
- Finals: Defeated Ulli Kaden (East Germany) by majority decision, 4–1

AIBA International Challenge (+91 kg), Los Angeles, California, April 1984:

- Defeated Biaggio Chianese (Italy) by unanimous decision, 5–0

(gold) Intercup (+91 kg), Karlsruhe, West Germany, May 1984:

- 1/2: Defeated Karl-Heinz Geus (West Germany) KO 2
- Finals: Defeated John Emmen (Netherlands) RSC 1

Cuba–USSR Duals (+91 kg), Havana, Cuba, August 1984:

- Defeated Valeriy Abadzhyan (Soviet Union) KO 2

(gold) Friendship Games (+91 kg), Havana, Cuba, August 1984:

- 1/2: Defeated Ulli Kaden (East Germany) KO 2
- Finals: Defeated Valeriy Abadzhyan (Soviet Union) RET 3

(gold) III TSC Tournament (+81 kg), Berlin, East Germany, September 1984:

- Finals: Defeated Ulli Kaden (East Germany) KO 2

XXIII Playa Girón National Championships (+91 kg), Nueva Gerona, Cuba, January 1985:

- 1/4: Lost to Félix Lemus (Cuba) by decision

(bronze) VI Military Spartakiad of the Friendly Armies of the Socialist Countries (+91 kg), Bydgoszcz, Poland, August 1985:

- 1/4: Defeated Khalil Nasser (Iraq) by walkover
- 1/2: Lost to Vyacheslav Yakovlev (Soviet Union) by unanimous decision, 0–5

(gold) IV TSC Tournament (+91 kg), Berlin, East Germany, September 1985:

- 1/2: Defeated Sergey Kormilitsyn (Soviet Union) by unanimous decision, 5–0
- Finals: Defeated Ulli Kaden (East Germany) by unanimous decision, 5–0

(gold) XXI Vaclav Prochazka Memorial (+91 kg), Ostrava, Czechoslovakia, October 1985:

- 1/4: Defeated ? Baguin (Czechoslovakia)
- 1/2: Defeated Ilya Iliev (Bulgaria)
- Finals: Defeated Biaggio Chianese (Italy) by walkover

(gold) XXIV Playa Girón National Championships (+91 kg), Havana, Cuba, January 1986:

- 1/2: Defeated Juan Carlos Ortega (Cuba) RSC 1
- Finals: Defeated Félix Lemus (Cuba) RET 3

(gold) XXXVII Strandzha Cup (+91 kg), Sofia, Bulgaria, February 1986:

- 1/4: Defeated Aleksander Burmistrov (Bulgaria) by majority decision, 4–1
- 1/2: Defeated Petar Stoimenov (Bulgaria) KO 2
- Finals: Defeated Lachezar Kamenov (Bulgaria) by unanimous decision, 5–0

(silver) XV Chemistry Cup (+91 kg), Halle, East Germany, March 1986:

- Finals: Lost to Ulli Kaden (East Germany) by unanimous decision, 0–5

(gold) XVII Ústí nad Labem Grand Prix (+91 kg) Ústí nad Labem, Czechoslovakia, March 1986:

- 1/2: Defeated Valeriy Aseyev (Soviet Union) RSC 2
- Finals: Defeated István Lévai (Hungary) by unanimous decision, 5–0

XIX Giraldo Córdova Cardín Tournament (+91 kg), Guantánamo, Cuba, April 1986:

- 1/4: Lost to Osvaldo Castillo (Cuba) by majority decision, 1–4

(gold) World Championships (+91 kg), Sparks Convention Center, Reno, Nevada, May 1986:

- 1/8: Defeated Ulli Kaden (East Germany) by unanimous decision, 5–0
- 1/4: Defeated Petar Stoimenov (Bulgaria) KO 1
- 1/2: Defeated Vyacheslav Yakovlev (Soviet Union) by majority decision, 4–1
- Finals: Defeated Alex García (United States) RSCH 2 (1:06)

He finished his twenty-years-long career having 332 fights under his belt, with a record of 302 wins, 22 losses (only 1 by knockout,) and 8 draws. Various western estimates totaling his record to 500+ fights, including there hundreds of unaccounted tough sparrings with a degree of aliveness outstanding for amateur boxing, which paid off with such an excellent career (his fearsome reputation alone brought him 22 walkover wins, and a number of byes to skip unnecessary encounters with a limited opposition.)

=== 1984 and 1988 Summer Olympics ===
Stevenson might have captured more gold medals for his country, but the Cuban government for purely political reasons boycotted the 1984 Los Angeles Games and refused to attend the 1988 Seoul Games because North Korea was not allowed to cosponsor the event.

External images
- Muhammad Ali and Teófilo Stevenson at the ring posing for the press photo
- Teófilo gives Muhammad a tour across Havana

At his prime in the 1970s, Stevenson dominance in the amateur heavyweight division coincided with Muhammad Ali's reign as the world's heavyweight champion in professional boxing. Stevenson was often dubbed by the American media as Ali's "Communist twin", and speculations went back and forth as to their much anticipated fight if Stevenson would accept an offer to turn pro (which in essence meant to defect and to leave Cuba permanently). Along with Pete Rademacher, he was the only amateur boxer who was offered a shot at the world's heavyweight title in his potential pro debut. Eventually Ali spent one week in Cuba with Stevenson, but their matchup would never happen. Stevenson, when he finally met Ali, suggested to Ali to arrange a three- or four-round fight. Ali refused to fight Stevenson's way, implying he would face him off in a standard 15-round championship bout, in which he would have an edge by outlasting his opponent (although in 1971 Ali himself invited the recent Soviet heavyweight champion Kamo Saroyan, who visited the United States, for a two-round bout). When the aging Ali was going to fight Larry Holmes in 1980, and Stevenson was making his way to the third gold medal in Moscow, Stevenson commented to the press that now it was Ali who should have insisted on a three- or four-round fight.

"Stevenson is a champion in all kinds of ways. He has it all. Stevenson is about as better fighter as I've ever seen, professional or amateur.
I haven't seen this much class and skill in the professional for a long time nor at the amateur. Stevenson would undoubtedly became champion of the world professionally if he decided to. He has the skill and qualification any time he wants to become champion of the world."

— George Foreman speaks on Stevenson's performance vs. Tate.

Stevenson turned down several lucrative offers to go pro, which came from various internationally well-known U.S. boxing kingpins, most notably from Don King and Bob Arum. King's top rival Arum almost succeeded and came the closest to pulling off an Ali-Stevenson matchup when the Cubans accepted his $1 million offer for five three-round exhibition fights. "We plan to use this money for social problems," an INDER official said at the time. But the U.S. Treasury Department did not allow the series, saying that it violated terms of the U.S. embargo against Cuba. Apart from that attempt, Arum used a Jamaican promoter, Lucien Chen, as a mediator, to propose a $1 million fight against Leon Spinks. "I envisioned a fight that would be attended by the two presidents, Fidel Castro and Jimmy Carter," Chen said.

Nevertheless, Stevenson's professional debut never did happen, because he remained loyal to the Cuban revolutionary ideals, never accepting any payday for himself, no matter how big it appeared. After knocking out three opponents at the Munich Olympics in September 1972, including Duane Bobick of the United States, Stevenson was approached by an American promoter, who offered him $1 million to turn pro on the spot. "I will not trade the Cuban people for all the dollars in the world," Stevenson was heard to say. "Stevenson would have been phenomenal as a pro, he could have been in the same class as Muhammad Ali or Joe Frazier. But we'll never know," said Don King.

=== Retirement ===
Stevenson finished his sports career in 1988. He started to work as a boxing trainer and sports functionary. He worked at the National Institute for Sports, Physical Education, and Recreation (INDER,) also he served as vice president of the Cuban Boxing Federation.

== Later life ==
In 1999, Stevenson was arrested for an altercation incident at Miami International Airport where, before boarding a United Airlines chartered jet of the Cuban national boxing team, he allegedly headbutted a 41-year-old United Airlines ticket counter employee, knocking out several of his teeth. According to Stevenson, an "agitator" approached him at the airport shouting insults against the Cuban government. Stevenson failed to attend the subsequent court proceedings, having travelled to Havana after his release from custody while on bail. The Cuban state newspaper Trabajadores blamed what it described as the "Miami mafia" (i.e. Cuban exiles, whose vast diaspora reside in Florida) for provoking the incident, alleging that the Cuban American National Foundation organised a public gathering to abuse Stevenson when he returned to Miami airport after his arrest. The newspaper believed that the motives for the alleged provocation were somehow to cast a shadow upon a Cuban sports star.

== Death ==
Stevenson died on 11 June 2012 of a heart attack in Havana at the age of 60. It was first reported by Cuban state media, stating "the Cuban sporting family was moved today by the passing of one of the greatest of all time".

He was survived by his two children.

A forthcoming documentary by Brin-Jonathan Butler, Split Decision, contains the last known interview with Stevenson.

== Awards and honours ==
- Stevenson was awarded the Val Barker Trophy for Outstanding Boxer at the 1972 Olympic Games.
- In 1972, Stevenson became a Merited Master of Sport of the USSR, one of a few foreign athletes to be awarded the title in its history.

Olympic Games
Preceded by Héctor Ramírez	Flagbearer for Cuba; Munich 1972; Montreal 1976; Moscow 1980	Succeeded by Héctor Milián
