= Francesco Damiani =

Italian boxer (born 1958)

Personal information
- Nationality: Italian
- Born: 4 October 1958 (age 68) Bagnacavallo, Emilia-Romagna, Italy
- Height: 1.90 m (6 ft 3 in)
- Weight: Heavyweight

Boxing career
- Stance: Orthodox

Boxing record
- Total fights: 32
- Wins: 30
- Win by KO: 24
- Losses: 2
Medal record
Men's amateur boxing
Representing Italy
Olympic Games
Silver medal – second place	1984 Los Angeles	Super-heavyweight
World Championships
Silver medal – second place	1982 Munich	Super-heavyweight
World Cup
Gold medal – first place	1983 Rome	Super Heavyweight
European Championships
Gold medal – first place	1981 Tampere	Super-heavyweight
Gold medal – first place	1983 Varna	Super-heavyweight
Mediterranean Games
Bronze medal – third place	1979 Split	Heavyweight
Trofeo Italia
Bronze medal – third place	Mestre 1981	Heavyweight
Gold medal – first place	Mestre 1982	Super Heavyweight
Gold medal – first place	Mestre 1983	Super Heavyweight
Gold medal – first place	Mestre 1984	Super Heavyweight
Italian National Boxing Championships
Gold medal – first place	1978 Veneto	Heavyweight
Gold medal – first place	1979 Fano	Heavyweight
Gold medal – first place	1980 Terracina	Heavyweight

Francesco Damiani (born 4 October 1958) is an Italian former professional boxer who competed from 1985 to 1993. He was the first WBO heavyweight world champion, having held the title from 1989 to 1991, as well as the European heavyweight title from 1987 to 1989. As an amateur he won silver medals in the super-heavyweight division at the 1982 World Championships and 1984 Summer Olympics.

== Amateur career ==
He participated at 1980 Summer Olympics in Moscow, where he lost to the eventual silver medalist Piotr Zaev in the quarter-finals. The following year he won the European Amateur Championships in Tampere. At the 1982 World Amateur Boxing Championships in Munich, he beat the legendary Teofilo Stevenson but lost to Tyrell Biggs in the final. In 1983 in Varna he became European champion for the second time, beating Ulli Kaden. He was ranked world's #1 super heavyweight by the AIBA in 1984 (ahead of Tyrell Biggs, who was ranked #2.) At the 1984 Summer Olympics in Los Angeles he again lost to Biggs in the final, despite Biggs' home crowd booing at the judges decision who believed Damiani won the contest (since he threw more punches and was moving forward for most of the contest) which led to the leading BBC boxing commentator Harry Carpenter, who was commentating for the BBC sport Olympic coverage, to say that "..it was the worst boxing decision in all my years of boxing commentating". Francesco Damiani was the Italian boxing team coach for the London 2012 Summer Olympics.

=== Olympic results ===
1980:

- Round of 16: Defeated Teodor Pîrjol (Romania) 4–1
- Quarterfinal: Lost to Piotr Zaev (Soviet Union) 0–5

1984:

- 1st round bye
- Defeated William Isangura (Tanzania) RSC 2
- Defeated Robert Wells (Great Britain) RSC 3
- Lost to Tyrell Biggs (United States) 1–4

== Professional career ==
Damiani began his professional career on a tear, with 27 consecutive victories. He defeated Tyrell Biggs in a rematch of their Olympic meeting, stopping him on a cut, and then won the newly created WBO Heavyweight title with a 3rd-round KO victory over Johnny DuPlooy on 6 May 1989. Damiani hit a brick wall when he took on 1988 Olympic Gold Medalist Ray Mercer in 1991 in Atlantic City, New Jersey. Damiani was ahead on points but went down after a Mercer left uppercut broke his nose, and he was counted out by the referee in the 9th round.

In 1991, he had been chosen to face Evander Holyfield for the undisputed heavyweight championship, but an injury prevented him from getting into the ring.

Damiani would come back in 1992 to take a decision over former champion Greg Page, but quit in the 8th round of the following bout versus Oliver McCall in 1993, ending his career.

In 1993 former mobster Sammy Gravano testified under oath that in the late 80s he attempted to arrange a fixed fight between Damiani, who Gravano alleged was associated with an organized crime family in Italy, and Renaldo Snipes. The winner (Snipes) would fight Tyson, however Damiani lost his fight with Ray Mercer before the Snipes bout and that put him out of the picture for a major fight.

== Professional boxing record ==
32 fights	30 wins	2 losses
By knockout	24	2
By decision	6	0

No.	Result	Record	Opponent	Type	Round, time	Date	Location	Notes
32	Loss	30–2	(United States) Oliver McCall	TKO	8 (10), 1:09	23 Apr 1993	(United States) The Pyramid, Memphis, Tennessee, US	
31	Win	30–1	(United States) Greg Page	UD	10	12 Sep 1992	(United States) Thomas & Mack Center, Paradise, Nevada, US	
30	Win	29–1	(United States) Michael Greer	KO	1 (10), 3:00	22 Apr 1992	(United States) Brendan Byrne Arena, East Rutherford, New Jersey, US	
29	Win	28–1	(United States) Frankie Swindell	PTS	8	7 Mar 1992	Fano, Italy	
28	Loss	27–1	(United States) Ray Mercer	KO	9 (12), 2:47	11 Jan 1991	(United States) Etess Arena, Atlantic City, New Jersey, US	Lost WBO heavyweight title
27	Win	27–0	(United States) Everett Martin	KO	2	20 Oct 1990	Carisport, Cesena, Italy	
26	Win	26–0	(Canada) Tony Morrison	KO	3 (10)	2 Jun 1990	Godiasco, Italy	
25	Win	25–0	(Argentina) Daniel Eduardo Neto	TKO	2 (12)	16 Dec 1989	Carisport, Cesena, Italy	Retained WBO heavyweight title
24	Win	24–0	(South Africa) Johnny du Plooy	KO	3 (12), 1:48	6 May 1989	Stadio Nicola De Simone, Syracuse, Italy	Won inaugural WBO heavyweight title
23	Win	23–0	(Germany) Manfred Jassmann	KO	3 (12)	17 Dec 1988	Sassari, Italy	Retained European heavyweight title
22	Win	22–0	(United States) Tyrell Biggs	TKO	5 (10), 1:06	29 Oct 1988	Palatrussardi, Milan, Italy	
21	Win	21–0	(Netherlands) John Emmen	TKO	3 (12)	22 Apr 1988	Palatrussardi, Milan, Italy	Retained European heavyweight title
20	Win	20–0	(United States) Dorcey Gaymon	TKO	4 (10)	22 Jan 1988	(United States) Convention Hall, Atlantic City, New Jersey, US	
19	Win	19–0	(Sweden) Anders Eklund	KO	6 (12), 2:40	9 Oct 1987	Aosta, Italy	Won European heavyweight title
18	Win	18–0	(United States) Eddie Richardson	PTS	10	11 Jul 1987	Corsico, Italy	
17	Win	17–0	(United States) James Broad	UD	10	11 Apr 1987	PalaDozza, Bologna, Italy	
16	Win	16–0	(United States) Eddie Gregg	TKO	1 (12)	14 Feb 1987	Lucca, Italy	Won vacant WBC International heavyweight title
15	Win	15–0	(United States) Rodney Smith	TKO	2	19 Dec 1986	Ancona, Italy	
14	Win	14–0	(United States) Kevin P Porter	TKO	5	14 Nov 1986	San Giuseppe Vesuviano, Italy	
13	Win	13–0	(United States) Rocky Sekorski	PTS	10	19 Sep 1986	Lerici, Italy	
12	Win	12–0	(United States) Donnie Long	KO	2	4 Jul 1986	Porlezza, Italy	
11	Win	11–0	(United States) Danny Sutton	TKO	7	30 May 1986	Abano Terme, Italy	
10	Win	10–0	(United States) Mike Perkins	TKO	5 (8)	2 Apr 1986	(United States) Ice World, Totowa, New Jersey, US	
9	Win	9–0	(United States) Tom Trimm	KO	2	14 Feb 1986	Milan, Italy	
8	Win	8–0	(United States) Bobby Crabtree	TKO	6	31 Jan 1986	Abbiategrasso, Italy	
7	Win	7–0	(Spain) Felipe Rodriguez	TKO	5	28 Sep 1985	Sassari, Italy	
6	Win	6–0	(United States) Rick Kellar	TKO	1 (6), 1:26	13 Jul 1985	(United States) Atlantis Hotel and Casino, Atlantic City, New Jersey, US	
5	Win	5–0	(United States) Walter Santemore	PTS	6	29 Jun 1985	Bellaria, Italy	
4	Win	4–0	(United States) Larry Roberson	TKO	1, 2:47	17 May 1985	(United States) Caesars Tahoe, Stateline, Nevada, US	
3	Win	3–0	(Luxembourg) Dragomir Milo Popovic	TKO	6	20 Apr 1985	Ceriale, Italy	
2	Win	2–0	(Germany) George Butzbach	TKO	2	8 Mar 1985	Modena, Italy	
1	Win	1–0	(Ivory Coast) Allou Gobe	TKO	3	5 Jan 1985	PalaEvangelisti, Perugia, Italy	

Sporting positions
Regional boxing titles
New title	WBC International heavyweight champion 14 February 1987 – October 1987; Vacated	Vacant Title next held by Jimmy Thunder
Preceded by Anders Eklund	European heavyweight champion 9 October 1987 – May 1989; Vacated	Vacant Title next held by Derek Williams
World boxing titles
Inaugural champion	WBO heavyweight champion 6 May 1989 – 11 January 1991	Succeeded by Ray Mercer
