= Zayev =

Zayev or Zaev (Cyrillic: Заев) is a Slavic masculine surname, its feminine counterpart is Zayeva or Zaeva.

People with the name include:

- Pyotr Zayev (1953–2014), Russian boxer
- Zoran Zaev (born 1974), Macedonian politician
