= Ataga =

Ataga may refer to:

- Solomon Ataga (born 1948), Nigerian boxer
- Ataga Khan (died 1562), prominent figure in the court of the Mughal emperor Akbar
