= Constantin Titoiu =

Romanian boxer (born 1958)

Personal information
- Nationality: Romanian
- Born: 21 August 1958 (age 68)

Sport
- Sport: Boxing
Medal record
Representing Romania
Romania National Amateur Boxing Championships
Gold medal – first place	1981 Bucharest	Flyweight
Gold medal – first place	1982 Bucharest	Flyweight
Gold medal – first place	1983 Constanța	Flyweight
Gold medal – first place	1984 Bucharest	Flyweight
Gold medal – first place	1985 Galați	Flyweight
World Amateur Championships
Bronze medal – third place	Munich 1982	Flyweight
European Amateur Championships
Silver medal – second place	Tampere 1981	Flyweight
Bronze medal – third place	Varna 1983	Flyweight

Constantin Titoiu is a retired amateur boxer from Romania. At the 1982 World Amateur Boxing Championships he won the bronze medal in the flyweight division (– 51 kg). In the semifinals he was beaten by eventual silver medalist Michael Collins of the United States. He also won five national senior titles and two bronze medals at the European Amateur Boxing Championships.
