= William Wells (boxer) =

British boxer (1936–2008)

Billy Wells
Personal information
- Nationality: British
- Born: 7 September 1936; London, England
- Died: 2008 (aged 71–72)

Sport
- Sport: Boxing

William Wells (7 September 1936 – 2008) known as Billy Wells was a British boxer. He was an Olympian and double ABA champion.

== Boxing career ==
In 1965, Wells boxing out of the Wandsworth ABC won the ABA heavyweight title. Despite this success he was surprisingly left out of the England team for the 1965 European Championships. Three years later in 1968 he won his second A.B.A Championship. Wells was now boxing for the Lynn Athletic Club and defeated Coventry's Frank Carpenter in the final at Wembley.

Despite being the oldest boxer (at 32 years of age), at the time of his second title win, he was selected for Great Britain to compete in the men's heavyweight event at the 1968 Summer Olympics, where he lost to eventual silver medalist Jonas Čepulis of the Soviet Union.

== Family ==
His son Bobby Wells competed at the 1984 Summer Olympics and won a bronze medal in the Super heavyweight division.
