= Floyd Favors =

American boxer

Personal information
- Full name: Floyd Favors
- Nationality: United States
- Born: December 3, 1963 (age 62) Washington, D.C.

Sport
- Sport: Boxing
- Weight class: Bantamweight
Medal record
Men's amateur boxing
Representing United States
World Amateur Championships
Gold medal – first place	1982 Munich	Bantamweight
Pan American Games
Bronze medal – third place	1983 Caracas	Bantamweight

Floyd Favors (born December 3, 1963, in Washington, D.C.) is a retired boxer from the United States. He is best known for winning the amateur world title in the men's bantamweight (– 54 kg) division in 1982.

Favors made his debut as a professional on 1985-03-13, defeating Godfrey Johnson. He ended his career after 20 bouts, having won 14 fights (KO 4) and lost five. His last bout was on 1992-06-26, when he was defeated by Leavander Johnson.
