= Viliami Pulu =

Tongan boxer

Personal information
- Nationality: Tongan
- Born: 14 May 1960 (age 64)

Sport
- Sport: Boxing

Viliami Pulu (born 14 May 1960) is a Tongan boxer. He competed in the men's super heavyweight event at the 1984 Summer Olympics.
