= István Lévai =

Hungarian boxer

Olympic medal record

Men's Boxing
| Bronze medal – third place | 1980 Moscow | Heavyweight |

István Lévai (born July 23, 1957) is a former boxer from Hungary, who won the bronze medal in the Heavyweight division (91 kg) at the 1980 Summer Olympics in Moscow. There he was defeated in the semifinals by titleholder Teófilo Stevenson of Cuba.

== Amateur career ==
Lévai was a nine-time Hungarian amateur champion.

=== Olympic Results ===
1980 Olympic Results - Boxed as a heavyweight

- Round of 16: bye
- Quarterfinals: Defeated Anders Eklund (Sweden) by majority decision, 4–1 (Eklund knocked down at 2:55 of the 3rd rd)
- Semifinals: Lost to Teófilo Stevenson (Cuba) by unanimous decision, 0–5 (was awarded bronze medal)

== Boxing coach ==
Lévai is currently the trainer of IBO super welterweight champion Attila Kovács.
