= Bernardo Comas =

Cuban boxer

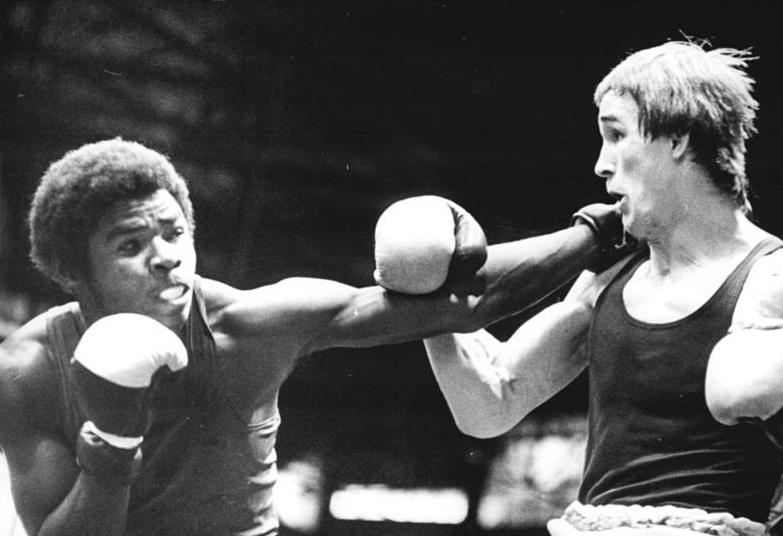
- Comas (left) fighting Manfred Trauten in 1981

Personal information
- Full name: Bernardo Comas Aguilera
- Nationality: Cuba
- Born: 14 November 1960 (age 65) Ligerito, near Colombia, Cuba

Sport
- Sport: Boxing
- Weight class: Middleweight
Medal record
Men's amateur boxing
Representing CUB
World Amateur Championships
Gold medal – first place	1982 Munich	Middleweight (-75 kg)
Central American and Caribbean Games
Gold medal – first place	1982 Havana	Middleweight (-75 kg)
Pan American Games
Gold medal – first place	1983 Caracas	Middleweight (-75 kg)
Friendship Games
Gold medal – first place	1984 Havana	Middleweight (-75 kg)

Bernardo Comas Aguilera (born 14 November 1960) is a Cuban former amateur boxer in the middleweight division who won the World Amateur Championships at Munich in 1982 and was a gold medalist at the 1983 Pan American Games.

Comas, who missed the 1984 Los Angeles Olympics due to the boycott, also won gold medals at the Central American and Caribbean Games and Friendship Games.
