= Teodor Pîrjol =

Romanian boxer

Personal information
- Nationality: Romanian
- Born: 22 February 1957 (age 68)

Sport
- Sport: Boxing

Teodor Pîrjol (born 22 February 1957) is a Romanian boxer. He competed in the men's heavyweight event at the 1980 Summer Olympics. At the 1980 Summer Olympics, he lost to Francesco Damiani of Italy.
