= Isaac Barrientos =

Puerto Rican boxer

Personal information
- Nationality: Puerto Rican
- Born: 25 May 1966
- Died: 14 June 1987 (aged 21) San Juan, Puerto Rico

Sport
- Sport: Boxing
Medal record
Men's amateur boxing
Representing Puerto Rico
World Cup
Bronze medal – third place	1985 Seoul	Super heavyweight

Isaac Barrientos Flores (25 May 1966 – 14 June 1987) was a Puerto Rican boxer. He competed in the men's super heavyweight event at the 1984 Summer Olympics. He was shot dead in San Juan, Puerto Rico, aged 21.

== See also ==
- List of unsolved murders (1980–1999)
