= Petr Galkin =

Russian boxer (1958–2026)

Personal information
- Native name: Пётр Юрьевич Галкин
- Nationality: Soviet Union; Russia
- Born: Petr Yuryevich Galkin; 5 June 1958 Kopeysk, Chelyabinsk Oblast, Russian SFSR, Soviet Union
- Died: 20 May 2026 (aged 67) Kopeysk, Chelyabinsk Oblast, Russia

Boxing career
Medal record
Men's amateur boxing
Representing Soviet Union
European Championships
Gold medal – first place	1983 Varna	Welterweight

Petr Yuryevich Galkin (Russian: Пётр Юрьевич Галкин; 5 June 1958 – 20 May 2026) was a Russian boxer. He competed at the 1983 European Amateur Boxing Championships, winning the gold medal in the welterweight event.

Galkin died in Kopeysk on 20 May 2026, at the age of 67.
