= 1983 European Amateur Boxing Championships =

Boxing competitions

- Host city: Varna
- Country: Bulgaria
- Nations: 19
- Athletes: 149
- Dates: 7–15 May

The Men's 1983 European Amateur Boxing Championships were held in Varna, Bulgaria from May 7 to May 15, 1983. The 25th edition of the bi-annual competition was organised by the European governing body for amateur boxing, EABA. 149 fighters from 19 European countries participated in the competition.

== Medal winners ==
Event	Gold	Silver	Bronze
Light Flyweight (– 48 kilograms)	(Bulgaria) Ismail Mustafov	(Italy) Salvatore Todisco	(Soviet Union) Beybut Eszhanov (Turkey) Mustafa Genc
Flyweight (– 51 kilograms)	(Bulgaria) Petar Lesov	(Hungary) Janos Varadi	(Soviet Union) Rashid Kabirov (Romania) Constantin Titoiu
Bantamweight (– 54 kilograms)	(Soviet Union) Yuri Alexandrov	(Socialist Federal Republic of Yugoslavia) Sami Buzoli	(Czech Republic) Pavel Madura (East Germany) Klaus-Dieter Kirchstein
Featherweight (– 57 kilograms)	(Soviet Union) Serik Nurkazov	(Bulgaria) Plamen Kamburov	(Hungary) Róbert Gönczi (East Germany) Frank Rauschning
Lightweight (– 60 kilograms)	(Bulgaria) Emil Chuprenski	(Italy) Carlo Russollilo	(Soviet Union) Viktor Demyanenko (Czech Republic) Tibor Puha
Light Welterweight (– 63.5 kilograms)	(Soviet Union) Vasiliy Shishov	(Socialist Federal Republic of Yugoslavia) Mirko Puzovic	(Bulgaria) Yordan Lesov (East Germany) Siegfried Mehnert
Welterweight (– 67 kilograms)	(Soviet Union) Petr Galkin	(Italy) Luciano Bruno	(Republic of Ireland) Kieran Joyce (Romania) Mihai Ciubotaru
Light Middleweight (– 71 kilograms)	(Soviet Union) Valeriy Laptyev	(East Germany) Ralf Hunger	(Bulgaria) Mikhail Takov (Romania) Gheorghe Simion
Middleweight (– 75 kilograms)	(Soviet Union) Vladimir Melnik	(Romania) Doru Maricescu	(East Germany) Henry Maske (Socialist Federal Republic of Yugoslavia) Nusret Redzepi
Light Heavyweight (– 81 kilograms)	(Soviet Union) Vitaliy Kachanovskiy	(Poland) Paweł Skrzecz	(Socialist Federal Republic of Yugoslavia) Pero Tadic (Turkey) Eyup Ciftci
Heavyweight (– 91 kilograms)	(Soviet Union) Alexandr Yagubkin	(Hungary) Gyula Alvics	(Romania) Paul Columbeanu (Poland) Grzegorz Skrzecz
Super Heavyweight (+ 91 kilograms)	(Italy) Francesco Damiani	(East Germany) Ulli Kaden	(Bulgaria) Petar Stoymenov (Soviet Union) Aleksandr Miroshnichenko

== Medal count table ==
1983 European Amateur Boxing Championship
Pos	Country	Gold	Silver	Bronze	Total
1	Soviet Union	8	0	4	12
2	Bulgaria	3	1	3	7
3	Italy	1	3	0	4
4	East Germany	0	2	4	6
5	Yugoslavia	0	2	2	4
6	Hungary	0	2	1	3
7	Romania	0	1	4	5
8	Poland	0	1	1	2
9	Czechoslovakia	0	0	2	2
9	Turkey	0	0	2	2
11	Ireland	0	0	1	1
	Total	12	12	24	48
