= Nassan Ajoub =

Syrian boxer

Personal information
- Full name: Nassan Said Ajoub
- Nationality: Syrian
- Born: 1 May 1960 (age 65); Homs, Syria
- Died: August 6, 2023; Henderson, Nevada

Sport
- Sport: Boxing

Nassan Ajoub (Arabic: نعسان عجوب; born 1 May 1960, died 6 August 2023) was a Syrian boxer. He competed at five Olympics, including the 1980 Summer Olympics and the 1984 Summer Olympics. At the 1980 Summer Olympics, he lost to Petar Stoimenov of Bulgaria. He began boxing professionally in 1984.
