= Klaus-Dieter Kirchstein =

German boxer

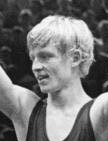
- Klaus-Dieter Kirchstein in 1982
Medal record
Men's boxing
Representing East Germany
Friendship Games
Bronze medal – third place	1984 Havana	Bantamweight
World Championships
Bronze medal – third place	1982 Munich	Bantamweight
European Championships
Bronze medal – third place	1983 Varna	Bantamweight

Klaus-Dieter Kirchstein is a German bantam boxer who won the bronze medals in international competitions. He competed for the SC Dynamo Berlin / Sportvereinigung (SV) Dynamo.
