= Luis Castillo (Ecuadorian boxer) =

Ecuadorian boxer

Personal information
- Nationality: Ecuadorian

Sport
- Sport: Boxing
Medal record
Representing Ecuador
Pan American Games
Bronze medal – third place	1979 San Juan	Heavyweight
World Cup
Bronze medal – third place	1981 Montreal	Heavyweight
Silver medal – second place	1983 Rome	Heavyweight

Luis Castillo is an Ecuadorian boxer. He competed in the men's heavyweight event at the 1980 Summer Olympics. At the 1980 Summer Olympics, he lost to Jürgen Fanghänel of East Germany. He was also a notable competitor at the AIBA World Cup and the Pan-American Games.
