= Olaf Mayer =

Austrian boxer

Personal information
- Nationality: Austrian
- Born: 18 February 1961 (age 64)

Sport
- Sport: Boxing

Olaf Mayer (born 18 February 1961) is an Austrian boxer. He competed in the men's super heavyweight event at the 1984 Summer Olympics.
