= Aziz Salihu =

Yugoslavian boxer (born 1953)

Medal record

Representing Yugoslavia

Men's Boxing

Olympic Games
Bronze medal – third place	1984 Los Angeles	+91 kg

European Championships
Bronze medal – third place	1981 Tampere	+91 kg
Bronze medal – third place	1985 Budapest	+91 kg

World Cup
Bronze medal – third place	1987 Belgrade	+91 kg

Mediterranean Games
Gold medal – first place	1987 Latakia	+91 kg

Aziz Salihu (born 1 May 1953 in Pristina, Yugoslavia) is one of the best retired Super heavyweight boxer of Kosovar Albanian descent. He represented Yugoslavia at the 1984 Summer Olympics in Los Angeles, California, and won the bronze medal in the super heavyweight division (> 91 kg), after a loss in the semifinals at the hands of Tyrell Biggs of the United States. Salihu also competed at the 1980 (Moscow) and 1988 Summer Olympics in Seoul, South Korea, where he was eliminated in the quarterfinals.

== Career ==
Salihu is celebrated in Kosovo and in amateur boxing circles for his more than 500 official matches among which he lost only 26. On club level Aziz had his best years while boxing for Pristina. He was part of the so-called golden generation and won eight Yugoslav championship titles (five consecutive). He won international medals in many other championships, including first places in the Mediterranean games and the World Cup in 1987. In Kosovo, he received the Sportsman of the Century Award and now works as the coach and manager of Boxing Club Pristina.

== 1980 Olympic results ==
Below is the record of Aziz Salihu, a Yugoslavian heavyweight boxer who competed at the 1980 Moscow Olympics:

- Round of 16: lost to Pyotr Zayev (Soviet Union) by decision, 0–5

=== Opponents ===
He defeated world and European champion Alexander Yagubkin in the tournament final in Belgrade (1980). In the tournament final in Belgrade (1984) he defeated the former world champion from Russia, Valery Abadzhyan. He beat world champion Francesco Damiani in an international tournament in Benghazi in Libya (1984). He beat Craig Payne, Ferenc Somodi, Håkan Brock, Marvis Frazier, Peter Hussing and Biaggio Chianese.
