= Gyula Alvics =

Hungarian boxer (born 1960)

Personal information
- Nationality: Hungarian
- Born: 12 January 1960 (age 66) Szigetvár, Hungary

Sport
- Sport: Boxing
Medal record
Men's boxing
Representing Hungary
Friendship Games
Silver medal – second place	1984 Havana	Heavyweight
European Amateur Championships
Silver medal – second place	1983 Varna	Heavyweight
Silver medal – second place	1985 Budapest	Heavyweight

Gyula Alvics (born 12 January 1960) is a Hungarian boxer. He competed in the men's heavyweight event at the 1988 Summer Olympics.
