= Michael Collins (boxer) =

American boxer

Personal information
- Nationality: United States

Sport
- Sport: Boxing
- Weight class: Flyweight/Bantamweight
Medal record
Men's amateur boxing
Representing USA
World Amateur Championships
Silver medal – second place	1982 Munich	Flyweight (-51 kg)
Pan American Games
Silver medal – second place	1987 Indianapolis	Bantamweight (-54 kg)

Michael Collins is an American former amateur boxer from Texas who was a silver medalist at both the 1982 World Amateur Boxing Championships and 1987 Pan American Games.

Collins was beaten by eventual 1984 Olympic gold medalist Steve McCrory in the flyweight final of the US Olympic trials, before moving up to the bantamweight division. As a three-time national bantamweight champion, Collins entered the 1988 Olympic trials as the favourite, but fell in the semi-finals to Kennedy McKinney, who also went on to win Olympic gold.
