= Ulli Kaden =

East German boxer (born 1959)

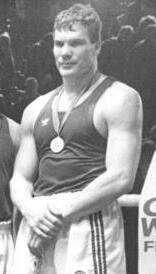
- Kaden in 1989

Personal information
- Born: Ulrich Kaden; 9 March 1959 (age 67) Munich, West Germany

Sport
- Sport: Boxing
Medal record
Representing East Germany
Men's boxing
European Amateur Championships
Gold medal – first place	Turin 1987	Super heavyweight
Gold medal – first place	Athens 1989	Super heavyweight
Silver medal – second place	Varna 1983	Super heavyweight
Bronze medal – third place	Tampere 1981	Super heavyweight
Friendship Games
Bronze medal – third place	1984 Havana	Super heavyweight

Ulrich Kaden (born 9 March 1959 in Munich) is a former East German amateur boxer, best known for winning the European title 1987 and 1989 at super heavyweight.

== Career ==
Kaden was 1980 to 1988 nine times champion of East Germany. In 1981 he lost in the European semi finals in Tampere to Francesco Damiani. In 1983 he beat Aleksandr Miroshnichenko but lost in the finals again to Damiani. In 1987 he beat Lennox Lewis in a tournament in Belgrade but Lewis KOd him in the first round of their quarter final bout at the Olympics the next year.

During his career Kaden beat Teófilo Stevenson three times but lost to him six times.
