= 1982 World Amateur Boxing Championships =

Boxing competitions

1982 AIBA World Boxing Championships
- Location: Munich, West Germany
- Start date: May 4, 1982
- End date: May 15, 1982

The Men's 1982 World Amateur Boxing Championships were held in Munich, West Germany from May 4 to 15. The third edition of this competition, held two years before the Summer Olympics in Los Angeles, California, was organised by the world governing body for amateur boxing AIBA.

== Medal table ==
Rank	Nation	Gold	Silver	Bronze	Total
1	Cuba (CUB)	5	1	1	7
2	United States (USA)	3	2	2	7
3	Soviet Union (URS)	3	2	1	6
4	Bulgaria (BUL)	1	0	2	3
5	East Germany (GDR)	0	1	3	4
6	Poland (POL)	0	1	1	2
6	South Korea (KOR)	0	1	1	2
8	Finland (FIN)	0	1	0	1
8	Italy (ITA)	0	1	0	1
8	Mongolia (MGL)	0	1	0	1
8	North Korea (PRK)	0	1	0	1
12	Yugoslavia (YUG)	0	0	4	4
13	Romania (ROU)	0	0	2	2
13	West Germany (FRG)	0	0	2	2
15	Ireland (IRL)	0	0	1	1
15	Netherlands (NED)	0	0	1	1
15	Nigeria (NGR)	0	0	1	1
15	Sweden (SWE)	0	0	1	1
15	Venezuela (VEN)	0	0	1	1
Totals (19 entries)		12	12	24	48

== Medal winners ==
Event	Gold	Silver	Bronze
Light Flyweight (– 48 kilograms)	Ismail Mustafov; Bulgaria	Go Yong-Hwan; North Korea	Huh Yong-Mo; South Korea Dietmar Geilich; East Germany
Flyweight (– 51 kilograms)	Yuri Alexandrov; Soviet Union	Michael Collins; United States	Jesús Pool; Venezuela Constantin Titoiu; Romania
Bantamweight (– 54 kilograms)	Floyd Favors; United States	Viktor Miroshnichenko; Soviet Union	(Socialist Federal Republic of Yugoslavia) Sami Buzoli; SFR Yugoslavia Klaus-Dieter Kirchstein; East Germany
Featherweight (– 57 kilograms)	Adolfo Horta; Cuba	Rawsalyn Otgonbayar; Mongolia	Richard Nowakowski; East Germany Bernard Gray; United States
Lightweight (– 60 kilograms)	Ángel Herrera; Cuba	Pernell Whitaker; United States	Viorel Ioana; Romania (Socialist Federal Republic of Yugoslavia) Milivoj Labudović; Yugoslavia
Light Welterweight (– 63,5 kilograms)	Carlos García; Cuba	Kim Dong-Kil; South Korea	(Socialist Federal Republic of Yugoslavia) Mirko Puzović; Yugoslavia Shadrah Odhiambo; Sweden
Welterweight (– 67 kilograms)	Mark Breland; United States	Serik Konakbayev; Soviet Union	Manfred Zielonka; West Germany Roland Omoruyi; Nigeria
Light Middleweight (– 71 kilograms)	Aleksandr Koshkyn; Soviet Union	Armando Martínez; Cuba	(Republic of Ireland) Tom Corr; Ireland Mikhail Takov; Bulgaria
Middleweight (– 75 kilograms)	Bernardo Comas; Cuba	Tarmo Uusivirta; Finland	Iran Barkley; United States Pedro van Raamsdonk; Netherlands
Light Heavyweight (– 81 kilograms)	Pablo Romero; Cuba	Paweł Skrzecz; Poland	Valeri Shin; Soviet Union (Socialist Federal Republic of Yugoslavia) Pero Tadić; Yugoslavia
Heavyweight (– 91 kilograms)	Alexander Yagubkin; Soviet Union	Jürgen Fanghänel; East Germany	Grzegorz Skrzecz; Poland Hermenegildo Baez; Cuba
Super Heavyweight (> 91 kilograms)	Tyrell Biggs; United States	Francesco Damiani; Italy	Peter Hussing; West Germany Petar Stoymenov; Bulgaria
