= 1981 European Amateur Boxing Championships =

Boxing competitions

- Host city: Tampere
- Country: Finland
- Nations: 22
- Athletes: 171
- Dates: 2–10 May

The Men's 1981 European Amateur Boxing Championships were held in Tampere, Finland from May 2 to May 10, 1981. The 24th edition of the bi-annual competition was organised by the European governing body for amateur boxing, EABA. 171 fighters from 22 European countries participated in the competition.

== Medal winners ==
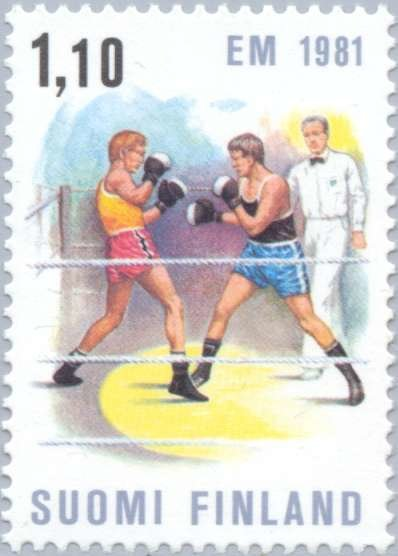
Finnish post stamp

Event	Gold	Silver	Bronze
Light Flyweight (– 48 kilograms)	(Bulgaria) Ismail Mustafov	(East Germany) Dietmar Geilich	(Soviet Union) Shamil Sabirov (Republic of Ireland) Gerard Hawkins
Flyweight (– 51 kilograms)	(Bulgaria) Petar Lesov	(Romania) Constantin Titoiu	(Poland) Bogdan Maczuga (Finland) Jarmo Eskelinen
Bantamweight (– 54 kilograms)	(Soviet Union) Viktor Miroshnichenko	(Socialist Federal Republic of Yugoslavia) Sami Buzoli	(Romania) Dumitru Cipere (West Germany) Stefan Gertel
Featherweight (– 57 kilograms)	(East Germany) Richard Nowakowski	(Poland) Krzysztof Kosedowski	(Soviet Union) Serik Nurkazov (Hungary) Róbert Gönczi
Lightweight (– 60 kilograms)	(Soviet Union) Viktor Rybakov	(Italy) Carlo Russolillo	(Finland) Vesa Wiik (France) Frederic Geoffroy
Light Welterweight (– 63.5 kilograms)	(Soviet Union) Vasiliy Shishov	(Socialist Federal Republic of Yugoslavia) Mirko Puzović	(Bulgaria) Nikolay Ganev (East Germany) Dietmar Schwarz
Welterweight (– 67 kilograms)	(Soviet Union) Serik Konakbayev	(East Germany) Karl-Heinz Krueger	(Hungary) Tibor Molnár (Sweden) Vesa Koskela
Light Middleweight (– 71 kilograms)	(Soviet Union) Alexandr Koshkin	(Socialist Federal Republic of Yugoslavia) Miodrag Perunović	(Bulgaria) Mikhail Takov (Hungary) Imre Némedi
Middleweight (– 75 kilograms)	(Soviet Union) Yuriy Torbek	(Netherlands) Pedro van Raamsdonk	(Poland) Zygmunt Gosiewski (Romania) Valentin Silaghi
Light Heavyweight (– 81 kilograms)	(Soviet Union) Alexandr Krupin	(Romania) Giorgica Donici	(Czech Republic) Ondrej Pustai (West Germany) Kurt Seiler
Heavyweight (– 91 kilograms)	(Soviet Union) Alexandr Yagubkin	(East Germany) Juergen Fanghaenel	(Romania) Ion Cernat (Bulgaria) Vasil Bosakov
Super Heavyweight (+ 91 kilograms)	(Italy) Francesco Damiani	(Soviet Union) Vyacheslav Yakovlev	(East Germany) Ulli Kaden (Socialist Federal Republic of Yugoslavia) Azis Salihu

== Medal count table ==
Host nation (Finland)

1981 European Amateur Boxing Championship
Pos	Country	Gold	Silver	Bronze	Total
1	Soviet Union	8	1	2	11
2	Bulgaria	2	0	3	5
3	East Germany	1	3	2	6
4	Italy	1	1	0	2
5	Yugoslavia	0	3	1	4
6	Romania	0	2	3	5
7	Poland	0	1	2	3
8	Netherlands	0	1	0	1
9	Hungary	0	0	3	3
10	Finland	0	0	2	2
10	West Germany	0	0	2	2
12	Czechoslovakia	0	0	1	1
12	France	0	0	1	1
12	Ireland	0	0	1	1
12	Sweden	0	0	1	1
	Total	12	12	24	
