= Robert Wells (boxer) =

English boxer (1961–2025)

Personal information
- Born: 15 May 1961 London, England
- Died: 5 September 2025 (aged 64)
Medal record
Men's Boxing
Representing Great Britain
Olympic Games
Bronze medal – third place	1984 Los Angeles	Super heavyweight

Robert William Wells (15 May 1961 – 5 September 2025), also known as Bobby Wells, was a British boxer. He won the super heavyweight bronze medal at the 1984 Summer Olympics.

Wells was born in London, the son of boxer Billy Wells, a competitor at the 1984 Summer Olympics. He turned pro two years later but had limited success. His career ended with a record of 3-2-0 in 1989, including two professional fights in the then Soviet Union in 1989. He was affiliated with the Kingston Amateur Boxing Club.

Wells died on 5 September 2025, at the age of 64. He had been a resident of Carshalton.
