= Solomon Ataga =

Nigerian boxer

Personal information
- Nationality: Nigerian
- Born: 8 April 1948 (age 76)

Sport
- Sport: Boxing

Solomon Ataga (born 8 April 1948) is a Nigerian boxer. He competed in the men's heavyweight event at the 1980 Summer Olympics. At the 1980 Summer Olympics he lost to Teófilo Stevenson of Cuba.
