= Boxing at the 1984 Summer Olympics – Super heavyweight =

Olympic boxing tournament

Super heavyweight boxing at the Games of the XXIII Olympiad
- Venue: Los Angeles Memorial Sports Arena
- Dates: 3 – 11 August 1984
- Competitors: 11 from 11 nations

Medalists
| 1st place, gold medalist(s) | | Tyrell Biggs | United States |
| 2nd place, silver medalist(s) | | Francesco Damiani | Italy |
| 3rd place, bronze medalist(s) | | Robert Wells | Great Britain |
| 3rd place, bronze medalist(s) | | Aziz Salihu | Yugoslavia |

The men's Super heavyweight event was part of the boxing programme at the 1984 Summer Olympics. The weight class allowed boxers of more than 91 kilograms to compete. The competition was held from 3 to 11 August 1984. 11 boxers from 11 nations competed.

== Medalists ==
| Gold | Tyrell Biggs; United States |
| Silver | Francesco Damiani; Italy |
| Bronze | Robert Wells; Great Britain |
| Bronze | Aziz Salihu; Yugoslavia |

== Results ==
The following boxers took part in the event:

| Rank | Name | Country |
|---|---|---|
| 1 | Tyrell Biggs | United States |
| 2 | Francesco Damiani | Italy |
| 3T | Robert Wells | Great Britain |
| 3T | Aziz Salihu | Yugoslavia |
| 5T | Willie Isangura | Tanzania |
| 5T | Viliami Pulu | Tonga |
| 5T | Peter Hussing | West Germany |
| 5T | Lennox Lewis | Canada |
| 9T | Olaf Mayer | Austria |
| 9T | Muhammad Youssef | Pakistan |
| 9T | Isaac Barrientos | Puerto Rico |

=== First round ===
- Peter Hussing (FRG) def. Olaf Mayer (AUT), 5:0
- Lennox Lewis (CAN) def. Mohammad Yousuf (PAK), RSC-3
- Tyrell Biggs (USA) def. Isaac Barrientos (PUR), 5:0

=== Quarterfinals ===
- Francesco Damiani (ITA) def. Willie Isangura (TNZ), RSC-2
- Robert Wells (GBR) def. Viliami Pulu (TNG), KO-1
- Aziz Salihu (YUG) def. Peter Hussing (FRG), 3:2
- Tyrell Biggs (USA) def. Lennox Lewis (CAN), 5:0

=== Semifinals ===
- Francesco Damiani (ITA) def. Robert Wells (GBR), RSC-3
- Tyrell Biggs (USA) def. Aziz Salihu (YUG), 5:0

=== Final ===
- Tyrell Biggs (USA) def. Francesco Damiani (ITA), 4:1
