= Grzegorz Skrzecz =

Polish boxer (1957–2023)

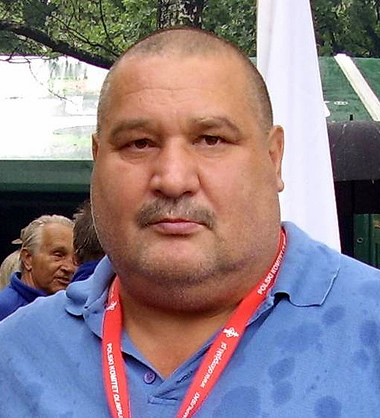
- Skrzecz in 2007

Personal information
- Nationality: Polish
- Born: 25 August 1957 Warsaw, Poland
- Died: 15 February 2023 (aged 65)

Sport
- Sport: Boxing
Medal record
Men's Boxing
Representing Poland
World Amateur Championships
Bronze medal – third place	1982 Munich	Heavyweight
European Amateur Championships
Bronze medal – third place	1983 Varna	Heavyweight

Grzegorz Skrzecz (25 August 1957 – 15 February 2023) was a Polish boxer, world championship medalist, actor, and the twin brother of Paweł Skrzecz. He competed in the men's heavyweight event at the 1980 Summer Olympics.

== Career ==
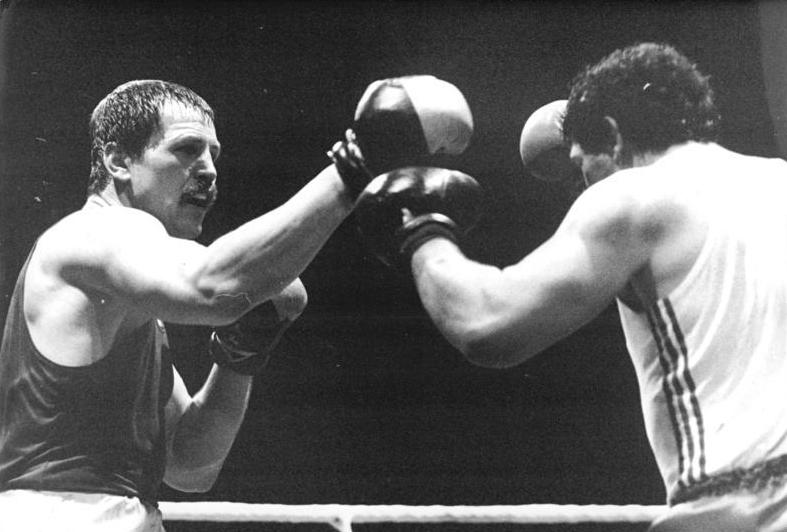
Skrzecz (right) fighting East Germany's Jürgen Fanghänel

He was bronze medalist of the World Championships in Munich 1982 and bronze medalist of the European Championships in Varna 1983 and five-time Polish champion (1979, 1980, 1981, 1982, 1984).

Winner of the tournament for the "Golden Belt of Polus" (1976)

Throughout his career he was associated with boxing section of Gwardia Warsaw. After retiring from competitive boxing in 1986, he became a trainer.

In 2013 he was a judge at the Polish Championships.

In total, he fought 278 fights (all in the light heavyweight category), of which 239 victories, 4 draws and 35 defeats.

== Death ==
Skrzecz died on 15 February 2023, at the age of 65.
