= William Isangura =

Tanzanian boxer (1952–2024)

Personal information
- Nationality: Tanzanian
- Born: 25 July 1952
- Died: 8 February 2024 (aged 71)

Sport
- Sport: Boxing
Medal record
Men's amateur boxing
Representing Tanzania
Commonwealth Games
Bronze medal – third place	1982 Brisbane	Heavyweight

William Isangura (25 July 1952 – 8 February 2024) was a Tanzanian boxer. He competed at the 1980 Summer Olympics and the 1984 Summer Olympics. At the 1980 Summer Olympics, he lost to Grzegorz Skrzecz of Poland.
