= Jürgen Fanghänel =

East German boxer

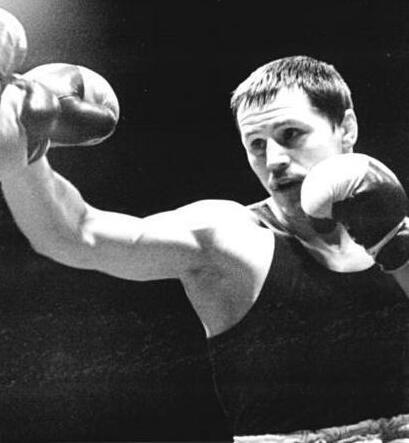
- Fanghänel fighting at the 1980 Olympic Eliminator

Personal information
- Full name: Jürgen Fanghänel
- Nationality: East Germany
- Born: 1 August 1951 (age 74) Limbach-Oberfrohna, East Germany
- Height: 1.87 m (6 ft 2 in)
- Weight: 90 kg (198 lb)

Sport
- Sport: Boxing
- Weight class: Heavyweight
- Club: Sportclub Karl-Marx-Stadt; Sport Gemeinschaft Wismut Gera
Medal record
Olympic Games
Bronze medal – third place	1980 Moscow	Heavyweight
World Amateur Championships
Silver medal – second place	1982 Munich	Heavyweight
Bronze medal – third place	1978 Belgrade	Heavyweight
European Amateur Championships
Silver medal – second place	1977 Halle	Heavyweight
Bronze medal – third place	1979 Cologne	Super Heavyweight
Silver medal – second place	1981 Tampere	Heavyweight

Jürgen Fanghänel (born 1 August 1951) is a retired East German amateur boxer, who competed in 1970s and 1980s.

== Career ==
Fanghänel won the bronze medal in the men's heavyweight division (91 kg) at the 1980 Summer Olympics in Moscow. There he was defeated in the semifinals by Pyotr Zayev of the Soviet Union. Two years earlier he also captured the bronze medal, at the second World Championships in Belgrade. In 1982 he ended up second at the World Championships in Munich, West Germany.

== Olympic results ==
1972 – Munich

- Defeated Atanas Suvandzhiev (Bulgaria) first-round knockout
- Lost to Ion Alexe (Romania) by decision, 0–5

1976 – Montreal

- Round of 32: Lost to Viktor Ivanov (Soviet Union) by decision, 2–3

(bronze) 1980 – Moscow

- Round of 16: Defeated Luis Castillo (Ecuador) by decision, 4–1
- Quarterfinal: Defeated Petar Stoimenov (Bulgaria) referee stopped contest in second round
- Semifinal: Lost to Pyotr Zayev (Soviet Union) by decision, 0–5 (was awarded bronze medal)
