= Anders Eklund (boxer) =

Swedish boxer

Personal information
- Born: 22 December 1957 Gävle, Sweden
- Died: 1 April 2010 (aged 52) Uppsala, Sweden
- Weight: heavyweight

Boxing career

Anders Eklund (22 December 1957 – 1 April 2010) was a Swedish boxer. He was nicknamed Lillen (Swedish: "Tiny"), but later chose the nickname "Viking".

Eklund was born in Gävle. He competed in the Heavyweight division (91 kg) at the 1980 Summer Olympics in Moscow, where he was defeated in the quarter finals. He made his pro debut on October 7, 1982, in Copenhagen. Eklund became the EBU European Heavyweight Champion on March 9, 1985, by beating Steffen Tangstad, but lost the belt in his next fight, against Britain's Frank Bruno. He regained the title in 1987 against the Spaniard Alfredo Evangelista but lost it the same year against the Italian Francesco Damiani.

The magazine Boxing Illustrated named Eklund "A solid 10 round winning fighter" in a ranking in the early 1990s where he was deemed among the top 20. Eklund died of a heart attack on 1 April 2010, following a collapse at his Uppsala apartment. He was 52 years old.

== Professional boxing record ==
19 Wins (10 knockouts, 9 decisions), 5 Losses (4 knockouts, 1 decision), 1 Draw Archived 2015-04-29 at the Wayback Machine
Result	Record	Opponent	Type	Round	Date	Location	Notes
Win	19-5-1	(United States) Garing Lane	UD	6	17/05/1990	Nordjysk Messecenter, Aars, Denmark	
Loss	18-5-1	(United States) Tim Witherspoon	KO	1 (10), 1:11	19/10/1989	(United States) Trump Plaza Hotel and Casino, Atlantic City, New Jersey, U.S.	
Win	18-4-1	(United States) Philipp Brown	UD	12	16/03/1989	(United States) Harrah's, Reno, Nevada, U.S.	WBA Americas Heavyweight Title.
Win	17-4-1	(United States) Rick Kellar	KO	3 (8), 2:38	12/12/1988	Helsinki Ice Hall, Helsinki, Finland	
Loss	16-4-1	(Italy) Francesco Damiani	KO	6 (12), 2:40	09/10/1987	Aosta, Italy	EBU Heavyweight Title.
Win	16-3-1	(Uruguay) Alfredo Evangelista	KO	7 (12)	28/03/1987	K.B. Hallen, Copenhagen, Denmark	EBU Heavyweight Title.
Win	15-3-1	(Italy) Stefano Vassallo	UD	8	27/02/1987	Randers Hallen, Randers, Denmark	
Win	14-3-1	(United States) Jesse Ferguson	PTS	8	17/10/1986	Randers Hallen, Randers, Denmark	
Win	13-3-1	(United States) Tony Foster	KO	2 (8), 2:56	03/10/1986	Idraetshuset, Copenhagen, Denmark	
Win	12-3-1	(United Kingdom) Glenn McCrory	UD	8	18/04/1986	Randers Hallen, Randers, Denmark	
Loss	11-3-1	(United Kingdom) Frank Bruno	KO	4 (12), 0:20	01/10/1985	(United Kingdom) Wembley Arena, London, England	EBU Heavyweight Title.
Win	11-2-1	(Norway) Steffen Tangstad	TKO	4 (12)	09/03/1985	Copenhagen, Denmark	EBU Heavyweight Title.
Win	10-2-1	(United States) Dorcey Gaymon	KO	8 (8)	09/11/1984	Copenhagen, Denmark	
Win	9-2-1	(Belgium) Rudy Gauwe	TKO	6 (8)	27/10/1984	Mariehamn, Finland	
Win	8-2-1	(United Kingdom) Rocky Burton	KO	1 (8), 1:00	05/10/1984	Randers Hallen, Randers, Denmark	
Loss	7-2-1	(Australia) Joe Bugner	MD	10	13/01/1984	Randers Hallen, Randers, Denmark	
Win	7-1-1	(United Kingdom) Steve Gee	TKO	5 (8), 1:47	17/12/1983	Hotel Arkipelag, Mariehamn, Finland	
Loss	6-1-1	(United Kingdom) Noel Quarless	TKO	1 (10), 1:10	13/10/1983	(United Kingdom) Crest Hotel, London, England	
Draw	6-0-1	(Italy) Guido Trane	PTS	6	06/10/1983	K.B. Hallen, Copenhagen, Denmark	
Win	6-0	(Republic of Ireland) Paddy Finn	KO	1 (8), 2:52	14/09/1983	(United Kingdom) Alexandra Palace, London, England	
Win	5-0	(Spain) Felipe Rodriguez	PTS	6	08/04/1983	K.B. Hallen, Copenhagen, Denmark	
Win	4-0	(United Kingdom) Terry O'Connor	PTS	4	11/02/1983	K.B. Hallen, Copenhagen, Denmark	
Win	3-0	(United Kingdom) Ricky James	KO	3 (4), 1:43	02/12/1982	Randers Hallen, Randers, Denmark	
Win	2-0	(United Kingdom) Theo Josephs	PTS	4	05/11/1982	K.B. Hallen, Copenhagen, Denmark	
Win	1-0	(France) Damien Marignan	PTS	4	07/10/1982	K.B. Hallen, Copenhagen, Denmark	

== Sources ==
- Anders Eklund's obituary at Aftonbladet (in Swedish)
