= Pyotr Zayev =

Russian boxer (1953–2014)

Personal information
- Born: 29 July 1953 Ssyolki, Voronezh Oblast, RSFSR, USSR
- Died: 29 November 2014 (aged 61) Lipetsk, Russia
- Height: 179 cm (5 ft 10 in)
- Weight: 87 kg (192 lb)

Sport
- Sport: Boxing
- Club: CSKA Moscow (1975–80); Dynamo Lipetsk (−1975)
Medal record
Representing Soviet Union
Olympic Games
| Silver medal – second place | 1980 Moscow | +81 kg |

Pyotr Ivanovich Zayev (Russian: Пётр Иванович Заев; 26 July 1953 – 29 November 2014) was a Russian heavyweight boxer who won a silver medal at the 1980 Summer Olympics, losing the final to Teófilo Stevenson.

Zayev was trained by his brother. He won Soviet heavyweight titles in 1975 and 1980, finishing second in 1973, 1974, 1976, and 1977. He was not selected for World or European championships prior to 1980. After his boxing career ended, he went on to become a career military officer with the Soviet Army and police forces, and retired in the rank of colonel. He held a PhD in pedagogy.

== 1980 Olympic results ==
Below is the record of Pyotr Zayev, a heavyweight boxer from the Soviet union, who competed at the 1980 Moscow Olympics:

- Round of 16: defeated Azis Salihu (Yugoslavia) by decision, 5-0
- Quarterfinal: defeated Francesco Damiani (Italy) by decision, 5-0
- Semifinal: defeated Jurgen Franghanel (East Germany) by decision, 5-0
- Final: lost to Teofilo Stevenson (Cuba) by decision, 1-4 (was awarded silver medal)

== Exhibition boxing record ==
| 1 fight | 0 wins | 0 losses |
|---|---|---|
| Non-scored | 1 | |

| No. | Result | Record | Opponent | Type | Round, time | Date | Location | Notes |
|---|---|---|---|---|---|---|---|---|
| 1 | —N/a | 0–0 (1) | (United States) Muhammad Ali | —N/a | 2 | Jun 20, 1978 | (Soviet Union) Moscow, RSFSR, U.S.S.R. | Non-scored bout |
