= Petar Stoimenov =

Bulgarian boxer

Personal information
- Nationality: Bulgarian
- Born: 8 April 1960 (age 65); Sofia, Bulgaria

Sport
- Sport: Boxing

Petar Stoimenov (born 8 April 1960) is a Bulgarian boxer. He competed at the 1980 Summer Olympics and the 1988 Summer Olympics.
