= Venezuela at the 1976 Summer Olympics =

- IOC code: VEN
- NOC: Venezuelan Olympic Committee

in Montreal
- Competitors: 32 in 6 sports
- Medals Ranked 34th: Gold 0 Silver 1 Bronze 0 Total 1

Summer Olympics appearances (overview)
- 1948; 1952; 1956; 1960; 1964; 1968; 1972; 1976; 1980; 1984; 1988; 1992; 1996; 2000; 2004; 2008; 2012; 2016; 2020; 2024

Venezuela competed at the 1976 Summer Olympics in Montreal, Quebec, Canada. 32 competitors, 23 men and 9 women, took part in 35 events in 6 sports.

== Medalists ==
Medal	Name	Sport	Event	Date
Silver	Pedro Gamarro	Boxing	Men's Welterweight	31 July

== Boxing ==
Athlete	Event	Round of 64	Round of 32	Round of 16	Quarterfinals	Semifinals	Final	
Athlete	Event	Opposition Result	Opposition Result	Opposition Result	Opposition Result	Opposition Result	Opposition Result	Rank
Armando Guevara	Light flyweight	—N/a	E Baltar (PHI); W 5–0	D Geilich (GDR); W 5–0	Li Byong-Uk (PRK); L 2–3	did not advance		
Alfredo Pérez	Flyweight	E Ríos (MEX); W 5–0	S El-Ashry (EGY); W W/O	G Kostadinov (BUL); W 5–0	L Błażyński (POL); L 2–3	did not advance		
Jovito Rengifo	Bantamweight	B Muwanga (UGA); W 5–0	O Martínez (CUB); L 0–5	did not advance				
Angel Pacheco	Featherweight	S Calderón (COL); W 5–0	C Calderón (PUR); W 5–0	A Herrera (CUB); L 0–5	did not advance			
Nelson Calzadilla	Lightweight	Bye	E Gonzalez (NIC); W 5–0	S Cuţov (ROU); L 5–0	did not advance			
Jesús Navas	Light Welterweight	J Okoth (UGA); W W/O	U Beyer (GDR); L 0–5	did not advance				
Pedro Gamarro	Welterweight	Bye	M Beneš (YUG); W 5–0	E Correa (CUB); W RSC-3	C Jackson (USA); W 3–2	R Skricek (FRG); W RSC-3	J Bachfeld (GDR); L 2–3	2nd place, silver medalist(s)
Alfredo Lemus	Light Middleweight	—N/a	M Dawuda (GHA); W W/O	R Davies (GBR); W 4–1	V Savchenko (URS); L KO-2	did not advance		
Fulgencio Obelmejias	Middleweight	—N/a	L Martínez (CUB); L 5–0	did not advance				
Ernesto Sánchez	Light Heavyweight	—N/a	G Stoymenov (BUL); L 5–0	did not advance				

== Cycling ==
Six cyclists represented Venezuela in 1976.

Individual road race

- Ramón Noriega – 5:03:13.0 (→ 53rd place)
- José Ollarves – 5:07:09.0 (→ 58th place)
- Justo Galaviz – did not finish (→ no ranking)
- Nicolas Reidtler – did not finish (→ no ranking)

Team time trial

- José Ollarves
- Justo Galaviz
- Jesús Escalona
- Serafino Silva
