= Boxing at the 1976 Summer Olympics – Flyweight =

Olympic boxing tournament

Flyweight boxing at the Games of the XXI Olympiad
- Venue: Maurice Richard Arena, Montreal
- Dates: 18–31 July 1976
- Competitors: 26 from 26 nations

Medalists
1st place, gold medalist(s)		Leo Randolph	United States
2nd place, silver medalist(s)		Ramón Duvalón	Cuba
3rd place, bronze medalist(s)		Leszek Blazynski	Poland
3rd place, bronze medalist(s)		David Torosyan	Soviet Union

The men's flyweight event was part of the boxing programme at the 1976 Summer Olympics. The weight class allowed boxers of up to 51 kilograms to compete. The competition was held from 18 to 31 July 1976. 26 boxers from 26 nations competed.

== Medalists ==
Gold	Leo Randolph; United States
Silver	Ramón Duvalón; Cuba
Bronze	Leszek Blazynski; Poland
Bronze	David Torosyan; Soviet Union

== Results ==
The following boxers took part in the event:

Rank	Name	Country
1	Leo Randolph	United States
2	Ramón Duvalón	Cuba
3T	Leszek Blazynski	Poland
3T	David Torosyan	Soviet Union
5T	Ian Clyde	Canada
5T	Davy Larmour	Ireland
5T	Jong Jo-ung	North Korea
5T	Alfredo Pérez	Venezuela
9T	Toshinori Koga	Japan
9T	Vicente Rodríguez	Spain
9T	Fazlija Šaćirović	Yugoslavia
9T	Charlie Magri	Great Britain
9T	Giovanni Camputaro	Italy
9T	Constantin Gruiescu	Romania
9T	Georgi Kostadinov	Bulgaria
16T	Virgilio Palomo	Colombia
16T	Mbarek Zarrougui	Morocco
16T	Muhammad Sadiq	Pakistan
16T	Antônio Toledo Filho	Brazil
16T	Kim Jeong-cheol	South Korea
16T	Joachim Schür	West Germany
16T	Julio Guzman	Puerto Rico
16T	Said Ahmed El-Ashry	Egypt
24T	Somchai Putapibarn	Thailand
24T	Ernesto Rios	Mexico
24T	Sándor Orbán	Hungary

=== First round ===
- Jung Chul-Kim (KOR) def. Somchai Putapibarn (THA), 5:0
- Said Ahmed El-Ashry (EGY) def. Sandor Orbán (HUN), 5:0
- Alfredo Pérez (VEN) def. Ernesto Rios (MEX), 5:0

=== Second round ===
- Toshinori Koga (JPN) def. Virgilio Palomo (COL), walk-over
- Ramón Duvalón (CUB) def. Souley Hancaradu (NIG), walk-over
- Ian Clyde (CAN) def. Alick Chiteule (ZAM), walk-over
- Charlie Magri (GBR) def. Eric Quaotsey (GHA), walk-over
- Vicente Rodríguez (ESP) def. Mbarek Zarrougui (MAR), RSC-2
- Jong Jo-Ung (PRK) def. Joachim Schür (FRG), RSC-2
- Giovanni Camputaro (ITA) def. Mohammad Sadiq (PAK), 5:0
- David Torosyan (URS) def. Hassen Sheriff (ETH), walk-over
- Agustín Martínez (NIC) def. Adroni Butambeki (UGA), walk-over
- David Larmour (IRL) def. Robert Musuku (SUA), walk-over
- Leo Randolph (USA) def. Massoudi Samatou (TOG), walk-over
- Constantin Gruescu (ROM) def. Douglas Maina (KEN), walk-over
- Leszek Błażyński (POL) def. Antonio Filho (BRA), KO-2
- Fazlija Šaćirović (YUG) def. Julio Guzmán (PUR), 5:0
- Alfredo Pérez (VEN) def. Said Ahmed El-Ashry (EGY), walk-over
- Georgi Kostadinov (BUL) def. Jung Chul-Kim (KOR), 5:0

=== Third round ===
- Ramón Duvalón (CUB) def. Toshinori Koga (JPN), 5:0
- Ian Clyde (CAN) def. Charlie Magri (GBR), KO-3
- Jong Jo-Ung (PRK) def. Vicente Rodríguez (ESP), 3:2
- David Torosyan (URS) def. Giovanni Camputaro (ITA), RSC-2
- David Larmour (IRL) def. Agustin Martínez (NIC), walk-over
- Leo Randolph (USA) def. Constantin Gruescu (ROM), 4:1
- Leszek Błażyński (POL) def. Fazlija Sacirović (YUG), 3:2
- Alfredo Pérez (VEN) def. Georgi Kostadinov (BUL), 5:0

=== Quarterfinals ===
- Ramón Duvalón (CUB) def. Ian Clyde (CAN), 5:0
- David Torosyan (URS) def. Jong Jo-Ung (PRK), 5:0
- Leo Randolph (USA) def. David Larmour (IRL), 4:1
- Leszek Błażyński (POL) def. Alfredo Pérez (VEN), 3:2

=== Semifinals ===
- Ramón Duvalón (CUB) def. David Torosyan (URS), DSQ-2
- Leo Randolph (USA) def. Leszek Błażyński (POL), 4:1

=== Final ===
- Leo Randolph (USA) def. Ramón Duvalón (CUB), 3:2
