= Boxing at the 1976 Summer Olympics – Featherweight =

Olympic boxing tournament

Featherweight boxing at the Games of the XXI Olympiad
- Venue: Maurice Richard Arena, Montreal
- Dates: 18–31 July 1976
- Competitors: 26 from 26 nations

Medalists
1st place, gold medalist(s)		Ángel Herrera	Cuba
2nd place, silver medalist(s)		Richard Nowakowski	East Germany
3rd place, bronze medalist(s)		Leszek Kosedowski	Poland
3rd place, bronze medalist(s)		Juan Paredes	Mexico

The men's featherweight event was part of the boxing programme at the 1976 Summer Olympics. The weight class allowed boxers of up to 57 kilograms to compete. The competition was held from 18 to 31 July 1976. 26 boxers from 26 nations competed.

== Medalists ==
Gold	Ángel Herrera; Cuba
Silver	Richard Nowakowski; East Germany
Bronze	Leszek Kosedowski; Poland
Bronze	Juan Paredes; Mexico

== Results ==
The following boxers took part in the event:

Rank	Name	Country
1	Ángel Herrera	Cuba
2	Richard Nowakowski	East Germany
3T	Leszek Kosedowski	Poland
3T	Juan Paredes	Mexico
5T	Gheorghe Ciochină	Romania
5T	Choi Chung-il	South Korea
5T	Bratislav Ristić	Yugoslavia
5T	Davey Armstrong	United States
9T	René Weller	West Germany
9T	Camille Huard	Canada
9T	Yukio Odagiri	Japan
9T	Tibor Badari	Hungary
9T	Behzad Ghaedi	Iran
9T	Gustavo de la Cruz	Dominican Republic
9T	Clarence Robinson	Jamaica
9T	Angel Pacheco	Venezuela
17T	Serge Thomas	France
17T	Ruben Mares	Philippines
17T	Raimundo Alves	Brazil
17T	Anatoly Volkov	Soviet Union
17T	Sen Rai	India
17T	Rumen Peshev	Bulgaria
17T	Ravsalyn Otgonbayar	Mongolia
17T	Pinit Boonjoung	Thailand
17T	Carlos Calderon	Puerto Rico
26T	Sandalio Calderon	Colombia

=== First round ===
- Rai Sik (IND) def. Andeh Davidson (NGA), walk-over
- Angel Pacheco (VEN) def. Sandalio Calderón (COL), 5:0
- Carlos Calderon (PUR) def. Boukary Assakande (BUR), walk-over

=== Second round ===
- René Weller (FRG) def. Serge Thomas (FRA), 3:2
- Gheorghe Ciochină (ROM) def. Jackson Ouma (KEN), walk-over
- Richard Nowakowski (GDR) def. Ruben Mares (PHI), 5:0
- Behzad Ghaedi Bardeh (IRN) def. John Sichula (ZAM), walk-over
- Camille Huard (CAN) def. Bachir Koual (ALG), walk-over
- Leszek Kosedowski (POL) def. Cornelius Boza-Edwards (UGA), walk-over
- Bratislav Ristić (YUG) def. Mohamed Younes Naguib (EGY), walk-over
- Gustavo de la Cruz (DOM) def. Rumen Peshev (BUL), 5:0
- Juan Paredes (MEX) def. Raimundo Alves (BRA), 5:0
- Yukio Odagiri (JPN) def. Ravsalyn Otgonbayar (MGL), KO-2
- Clarence Robinson (JAM) def. Jonathan Magagula (SUA), walk-over
- Choon Gil-Choi (KOR) def. Piniit Boonjuang (THA), KO-1
- Dave Armstrong (USA) def. Anatoly Volkov (URS), 5:0
- Tibor Badari (HUN) def. Gizaw Asefa (ETH), walk-over
- Ángel Herrera (CUB) def. Rai Sik (IND), KO-1
- Angel Pacheco (VEN) def. Carlos Calderón (PUR), 5:0

=== Third round ===
- Gheorghe Ciochină (ROM) def. René Weller (FRG), 4:1
- Richard Nowakowski (GDR) def. Behzad Ghaedi Bardeh (IRN), RSC-3
- Leszek Kosedowski (POL) def. Camille Huard (CAN), 5:0
- Bratislav Ristić (YUG) def. Gustavo de la Cruz (DOM), 4:1
- Juan Paredes (MEX) def. Yukio Odagiri (JPN), 3:2
- Choon Gil-Choi (KOR) def. Clarence Robinson (JAM), DSQ-3
- Dave Armstrong (USA) def. Tibor Badari (HUN), 5:0
- Ángel Herrera (CUB) def. Angel Pacheco (VEN), 5:0

=== Quarterfinals ===
- Richard Nowakowski (GDR) def. Gheorghe Ciochină (ROM), RSC-3
- Leszek Kosedowski (POL) def. Bratislav Ristić (YUG), 5:0
- Juan Paredes (MEX) def. Choon Gil-Choi (KOR), 4:1
- Ángel Herrera (CUB) def. Dave Armstrong (USA), 3:2

=== Semifinals ===
- Richard Nowakowski (GDR) def. Leszek Kosedowski (POL), 5:0
- Ángel Herrera (CUB) def. Juan Paredes (MEX), 5:0

=== Final ===
- Ángel Herrera (CUB) def. Richard Nowakowski (GDR), KO-2
