= Boxing at the 1976 Summer Olympics – Middleweight =

Olympic boxing tournament

Middleweight boxing at the Games of the XXI Olympiad
- Venue: Maurice Richard Arena, Montreal
- Dates: 19–31 July 1976
- Competitors: 19 from 19 nations

Medalists
1st place, gold medalist(s)		Michael Spinks	United States
2nd place, silver medalist(s)		Rufat Riskiyev	Soviet Union
3rd place, bronze medalist(s)		Luis Martínez	Cuba
3rd place, bronze medalist(s)		Alec Năstac	Romania

The men's middleweight event was part of the boxing programme at the 1976 Summer Olympics. The weight class allowed boxers of up to 75 kilograms to compete. The competition was held from 19 to 31 July 1976. 19 boxers from 19 nations competed.

== Medalists ==
Gold	Michael Spinks; United States
Silver	Rufat Riskiyev; Soviet Union
Bronze	Luis Martínez; Cuba
Bronze	Alec Năstac; Romania

== Results ==
The following boxers took part in the event:

Rank	Name	Country
1	Michael Spinks	United States
2	Rufat Riskiyev	Soviet Union
3T	Luis Martínez	Cuba
3T	Alec Năstac	Romania
5T	Ryszard Pasiewicz	Poland
5T	Dragan Vujković	Yugoslavia
5T	Fernando Martins	Brazil
5T	Siraj Din	Pakistan
9T	Jean-Pierre Malavasi	France
9T	Dave Odwell	Great Britain
9T	Phil McElwaine	Australia
9T	Bernd Wittenburg	East Germany
9T	Ilian Dimitrov	Bulgaria
14T	Carlos Betancourt	Puerto Rico
14T	Bryan Gibson	Canada
14T	Nicolás Arredondo	Mexico
14T	Mohamed Saoud	Morocco
14T	Fulgencio Obelmejias	Venezuela
14T	Jorma Taipale	Finland

=== First round ===
- Dragomir Vujković (YUG) def. Carlos Betancourt (PUR), 5:0
- David Odwell (GBR) def. Mohamed Saoud (MAR), 5:0
- Bernd Wittenburg (GDR) def. Bryan Gibson (CAN), KO-3
- Luis Felipe Martínez (CUB) def. Fulgencio Obelmejias (VEN), 5:0
- Siraj Din (PAK) def. Nicolas Arredondo (MEX), RSC-3
- Lotti Mwale (ZAM) def. Zakaria Amalemba (KEN), both walk-over
- Ilya Dimitrov (BUL) def. Musa Gariba (GHA), walk-over
- Rufat Riskiyev (URS) def. Jorma Taipale (FIN), KO-3

=== Second round ===
- Ryszard Pasiewicz (POL) def. Jean-Pierre Malavasi (FRA), KO-2
- Michael Spinks (USA) def. Jean-Marie Emebe (CMR), walk-over
- Fernando Martins (BRA) def. Matouk Elsadek (LIB), walk-over
- Alec Năstac (ROM) def. Philip McElwaine (AUS), 3:2
- Dragomir Vujković (YUG) def. David Odwell (GBR), 5:0
- Luis Felipe Martínez (CUB) def. Bernd Wittenburg (GDR), 3:2
- Siraj Din (PAK) – Bye
- Rufat Riskiyev (URS) def. Ilya Dimitrov (BUL), 5:0

=== Quarterfinals ===
- Michael Spinks (USA) def. Ryszard Pasiewicz (POL), 5:0
- Alec Năstac (ROM) def. Fernando Martins (BRA), 3:2
- Luis Felipe Martínez (CUB) def. Dragomir Vujković (YUG), 5:0
- Rufat Riskiyev (URS) def. Siraj Din (PAK), RSC-2

=== Semifinals ===
- Michael Spinks (USA) def. Alec Năstac (ROM), walk-over
- Rufat Riskiyev (URS) def. Luis Felipe Martínez (CUB), 3:2

=== Final ===
In the gold medal bout, American rookie Spinks faced the veteran Soviet Rufat Riskiyev, the 1974 World Champion. Riskiyev had defeated Spinks at a match in Tashkent early in 1976, but in the final, Spinks landed a telling body blow in round three, and the referee had to stop the contest, giving Spinks, just 19 years of age, the gold medal.

Spinks, whose brother, Leon, won the light-heavyweight gold medal in Montreal, turned professional. In 1981 he won the WBA light-heavyweight world title by defeating Eddie Mustafa Muhammad. Michael Spinks would hold a version of the light-heavyweight title through 1985 when he moved up to the heavies and defeated Larry Holmes to win the IBF heavyweight crown, the first light-heavyweight champion to move on to become heavyweight world champ. Spinks fought through 1988, winning his first 31 fights, but he retired after losing a heavyweight title fight that year to Mike Tyson.

Riskiyev, who was 27 at the time of the 1976 Olympics, stayed in the amateurs, as the Soviet system did not allow any athletes to turn pro, though he didn’t achieve further success.

- Michael Spinks (USA) def. Rufat Riskiyev (URS), RSC-3
