= Ángel Herrera Vera =

Cuban boxer (born 1957)

Ángel Herrera
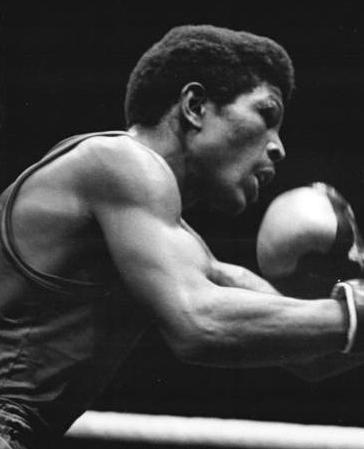
- Angel Herrera battling Siegfried Mehnert (GDR)

Personal information
- Full name: Ángel Herrera Vera
- Nationality: Cuba
- Born: August 2, 1957 (age 68) Guantánamo
- Height: 1.59 m (5 ft 3 in)
- Weight: 57 kg (126 lb)

Sport
- Sport: Boxing
- Weight class: Lightweight and Featherweight
Medal record
Men's amateur boxing
Representing Cuba
Olympic Games
| Gold medal – first place | 1976 Montreal | Featherweight |
| Gold medal – first place | 1980 Moscow | Lightweight |
Friendship Games
| Gold medal – first place | 1984 Havana | Lightweight |
World Championships
| Gold medal – first place | 1978 Belgrade | Featherweight |
| Gold medal – first place | 1982 Munich | Lightweight |
Pan American Games
| Silver medal – second place | 1983 Caracas | Lightweight |

Ángel Herrera Vera (born August 2, 1957, in Guantánamo) is a Cuban amateur boxer, who won two Olympic gold medals, and the world title at the second World Championships in Belgrade.

First competing in the featherweight (– 57 kg) category, he won the 1976 Olympics as well as the 1978 World Amateur Boxing Championships. He then competed in lightweight (– 60 kg) to win another Olympic gold in 1980, and his second World Title in Munich, West Germany. In 1983 he won a silver medal at the Pan American Games.

== Results ==
1976 Summer Olympics - Montreal

- Round of 64: bye
- Round of 32: Defeated Rai Sik (India) KO 1
- Round of 16: Defeated Angel Pacheco (Venezuela) 5–0
- Quarterfinal: Defeated Davey Lee Armstrong (United States) 3–2
- Semifinal: Defeated Juan Paredes (Mexico) 5–0
- Final: Defeated Richard Nowakowski (East Germany) KO 2

1978 World Amateur Championships

- Defeated Hirochi Ganobe (Japan) RSC-3
- Defeated Viorel Ioana (Romania) walkover
- Defeated Roman Gotfryd (Poland) by decision, 5–0
- Defeated Bratislav Ristić (Yugoslavia) by decision, 4–1

1980 Summer Olympics - Moscow

- Round of 32 Carlo Russolillo (Italy) by decision, 5–0
- Round of 16: Defeated Geza Tumbas (Yugoslavia) by decision, 5–0
- Quarterfinal: Defeated Galsandorj Batbileg (Mongolia) by decision, 5–0
- Semifinal: Defeated Kazimierz Adach (Poland) by decision, 5–0
- Final: Defeated Viktor Demyanenko (USSR) TKO 3

1982 World Amateur Championships

- Defeated Juhito Arai (Japan) 5:0
- Defeated Kosem Barake (Israel) KO-2
- Defeated Lotfi Belkhir (Tunisia) RSC-1
- Defeated Viorel Ioana (Romania) 4:1
- Defeated Pernell Whitaker (United States) 3:2
