= Boxing at the 1980 Summer Olympics – Lightweight =

Boxing competitions

Lightweight boxing at the Games of the XXII Olympiad
- Venue: Olympiysky Sports Complex
- Date: 20 July – 2 August 1980
- Competitors: 29 from 29 nations

Medalists
1st place, gold medalist(s)		Ángel Herrera	Cuba
2nd place, silver medalist(s)		Viktor Demyanenko	Soviet Union
3rd place, bronze medalist(s)		Kazimierz Adach	Poland
3rd place, bronze medalist(s)		Richard Nowakowski	East Germany

The lightweight boxing competition at the 1980 Olympic Games in Moscow was held from 20 July to 2 August at the Olympiysky Sports Complex. 29 boxers from 29 nations competed.

== Schedule ==
Date	Time	Round
Sunday, 20 July 1980	12:00; 18:00	Round of 32
Friday, 25 July 1980	12:00; 18:00	Round of 16
Tuesday, 29 July 1980	13:00	Quarterfinals
Thursday, 31 July 1980	13:00	Semifinals
Saturday, 2 August 1980	15:00	Final

== Results ==
=== Finals ===
Semifinals
Richard Nowakowski (GDR)
Viktor Demyanenko (URS)	RSC
Ángel Herrera (CUB)	5
Kazimierz Adach (POL)	0

Final
Viktor Demyanenko (URS)
Ángel Herrera (CUB)	RSC

=== Top half ===
Round of 32
Christopher Ossai (NGR)	0
Richard Nowakowski (GDR)	5
Tibor Dezamits (HUN)	5
Alphonse Matoubela (CGO)	0
Patrice Martin (BEN)
Yordan Lesov (BUL)	KO
Rabani Ghulam (AFG)
Jong Jo-ung (PRK)	RSC
Mohamed Bangura (SLE)	DSQ
Viktor Demyanenko (URS)

Round of 16
Blackson Siukoko (ZAM)	1
George Gilbody (GBR)	4
Geofrey Nyeko (UGA)
Richard Nowakowski (GDR)	RSC
Tibor Dezamits (HUN)	1
Yordan Lesov (BUL)	4
Jong Jo-ung (PRK)	0
Viktor Demyanenko (URS)	5

Quarterfinals
George Gilbody (GBR)	0
Richard Nowakowski (GDR)	5
Yordan Lesov (BUL)	0
Viktor Demyanenko (URS)	5

Semifinals
Richard Nowakowski (GDR)
Viktor Demyanenko (URS)	RSC

=== Bottom half ===
Round of 32
Norman Stevens (AUS)	1
Geza Tumbas (YUG)	4
Ángel Herrera (CUB)	5
Carlo Russolillo (ITA)	0
Galsandorjiin Batbileg (MGL)	5
Alberto Coelho (ANG)	0
Sylvain Rajefiarison (MAD)	0
Jesper Garnell (DEN)	5
Bounphisith Songkhamphou (LAO)
Kazimierz Adach (POL)	RSC
Omari Golaya (TAN)	5
Kalervo Alanenpää (SWE)	0
Tadesse Haile (ETH)	DSQ
Florian Livadaru (ROU)
Sean Doyle (IRL)	RSC
Nelson Trujillo (VEN)

Round of 16
Geza Tumbas (YUG)	0
Ángel Herrera (CUB)	5
Galsandorj Batbileg (MGL)	4
Jesper Garnell (DEN)	1
Kazimierz Adach (POL)	5
Omari Golaya (TAN)	0
Florian Livadaru (ROU)	RSC
Sean Doyle (IRL)

Quarterfinals
Ángel Herrera (CUB)	5
Galsandorj Batbileg (MGL)	0
Kazimierz Adach (POL)	RSC
Florian Livadaru (ROU)

Semifinals
Ángel Herrera (CUB)	5
Kazimierz Adach (POL)	0
