= Dragan Vujković =

Yugoslav boxer (born 1953)

Personal information
- Nationality: Yugoslav
- Born: Dragomir Vujković; 4 April 1953 (age 73) Subotica, SR Serbia, Yugoslavia
- Height: 1.86 m (6 ft 1 in)
- Weight: Middleweight; Heavyweight

Boxing career
Medal record
Men's amateur boxing
Representing Yugoslavia
World Amateur Boxing Championships
Silver medal – second place	1978 Belgrade	Heavyweight
Bronze medal – third place	1974 Havana	Middleweight
Mediterranean Games
Gold medal – first place	1979 Split	Heavyweight

Dragomir "Dragan" Vujković (Serbian Cyrillic: Драгомир Драган Вујковић; born 4 April 1953) is a retired Yugoslav boxer who competed at the international level during the 1970s. He is best known for winning the silver medal in the heavyweight division at the 1978 World Amateur Boxing Championships and the gold medal at the 1979 Mediterranean Games. He represented Yugoslavia at the 1976 Summer Olympics.

== Amateur career ==
Vujković was a key member of the Yugoslav national team from 1970 to 1982.

=== Olympic Games ===
At the 1976 Summer Olympics in Montreal, Vujković competed in the middleweight division (-75 kg). He won his first two bouts by unanimous decision but was eliminated in the quarterfinals by the eventual bronze medalist, Luis Felipe Martínez of Cuba.

- Round of 32: Defeated Carlos Betancourt (Puerto Rico) – Decision 5:0
- Round of 16: Defeated David Odwell (Great Britain) – Decision 5:0
- Quarterfinal: Lost to Luis Felipe Martínez (Cuba) – Decision 0:5

=== World Championships ===
Vujković won a bronze medal in the middleweight division at the inaugural 1974 World Amateur Boxing Championships in Havana.

At the 1978 World Amateur Boxing Championships held in Belgrade, he moved up to the heavyweight division (+81 kg). He reached the final on home soil but was defeated by the three-time Olympic champion Teófilo Stevenson of Cuba via abandonment in the second round, securing the silver medal.

=== Other international results ===
Vujković won the gold medal in the heavyweight division at the 1979 Mediterranean Games in Split. He was also the runner-up in the light heavyweight division at the 1979 Yugoslav Boxing Championships, losing to Tadija Kačar.

== Professional career and later life ==
Vujković had a brief professional career in the 1980s, compiling a record of 6 wins and 2 losses.

After retiring from competition, he worked as a boxing coach. He notably trained Nenad Borovčanin, who went on to become the European cruiserweight champion.
