= Juan Paredes (boxer) =

Mexican boxer (born 1953)

Personal information
- Born: January 29, 1953 (age 73)
Medal record
Men's Boxing
Representing Mexico
Olympic Games
| Bronze medal – third place | 1976 Montreal | Featherweight |

Juan Paredes Miranda (born January 29, 1953) is a Mexican former boxer who won the bronze medal in the men's featherweight division (– 57 kg) at the 1976 Summer Olympics in Montreal, Quebec, Canada. There he was defeated in the semifinals by eventual gold medalist Ángel Herrera of Cuba. Miranda was born in Azcapotzalco.

== 1976 Olympic results ==
Below are the results of Juan Paredes, a Mexican featherweight boxer who competed at the 1976 Montreal Olympics:

- Round of 64: bye
- Round of 32: Defeated Raimundo Alves (Brazil) by decision, 5-0
- Round of 16: Defeated Yukio Odagiri (Japan) by decision, 3-2
- Quarterfinal: Defeated Choon Gil-Choi (South Korea) by decision, 4-1
- Semifinal: Lost to Ángel Herrera (Cuba) by decision, 0-5 (was awarded a bronze medal)

== Professional career ==
Paredes turned pro in 1977 and had limited success. He never challenged for a major title and retired in 1988 with a career record of 23-12-0 with 19 KO's.
