= Richard Nowakowski =

East German boxer

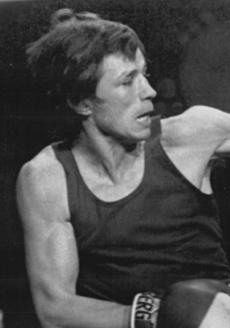
- Richard Nowakowski in 1981

Personal information
- Full name: Richard Nowakowski
- Nationality: East Germany
- Born: 27 September 1955 (age 70) Sztum, Pomorskie, Poland
- Height: 1.74 m (5 ft 9 in)
- Weight: 57 kg (126 lb)

Sport
- Sport: Boxing
- Weight class: Featherweight
- Club: Schweriner SC, Schwerin
Medal record
Representing East Germany
Olympic Games
Silver medal – second place	1976 Montreal	Featherweight
Bronze medal – third place	1980 Moscow	Lightweight
World Amateur Championships
Bronze medal – third place	1982 Munich	Featherweight
European Amateur Championships
Gold medal – first place	1977 Halle	Featherweight
Gold medal – first place	1981 Tampere	Featherweight

Richard Nowakowski (born 27 September 1955 in Sztum, Poland) is a retired boxer from East Germany, who won the silver medal in the men's featherweight division (– 57 kg) at the 1976 Summer Olympics in Montreal, Quebec, Canada. There he was defeated in the final by Ángel Herrera of Cuba.

Four years later, when Moscow hosted the Summer Games, Nowakowski competed in the lightweight category (– 60 kg), and captured a bronze medal. This was the same result he attained in 1982 at the World Championships in Munich, West Germany.

== Olympic results ==
1976 – Montreal

- Round of 64: bye
- Round of 32: Defeated Ruben Mares (Philippines) by decision, 5–0
- Round of 16: Defeated Behzad Ghaedi Bardeh (Iran) referee stopped contest in third round
- Quarterfinal: Defeated Gheorghe Ciochina (Romania) referee stopped contest in third round
- Semifinal: Defeated Leszek Kosedowski (Poland) by decision, 5–0
- Final: Lost to Ángel Herrera (Cuba) second-round knockout (was awarded silver medal)

1980 – Moscow

- Round of 32: Defeated Christopher Ossai (Nigeria) by decision, 5–0
- Round of 16: Defeated Geofrey Nyeko (Uganda) referee stopped contest in the first round
- Quarterfinal: Defeated George Gilbody (Great Britain) by decision, 5–0
- Semifinal: Lost to Viktor Demyanenko (Soviet Union) referee stopped contest in the first round (was awarded bronze medal)
