= René Weller =

German boxer (1953–2023)

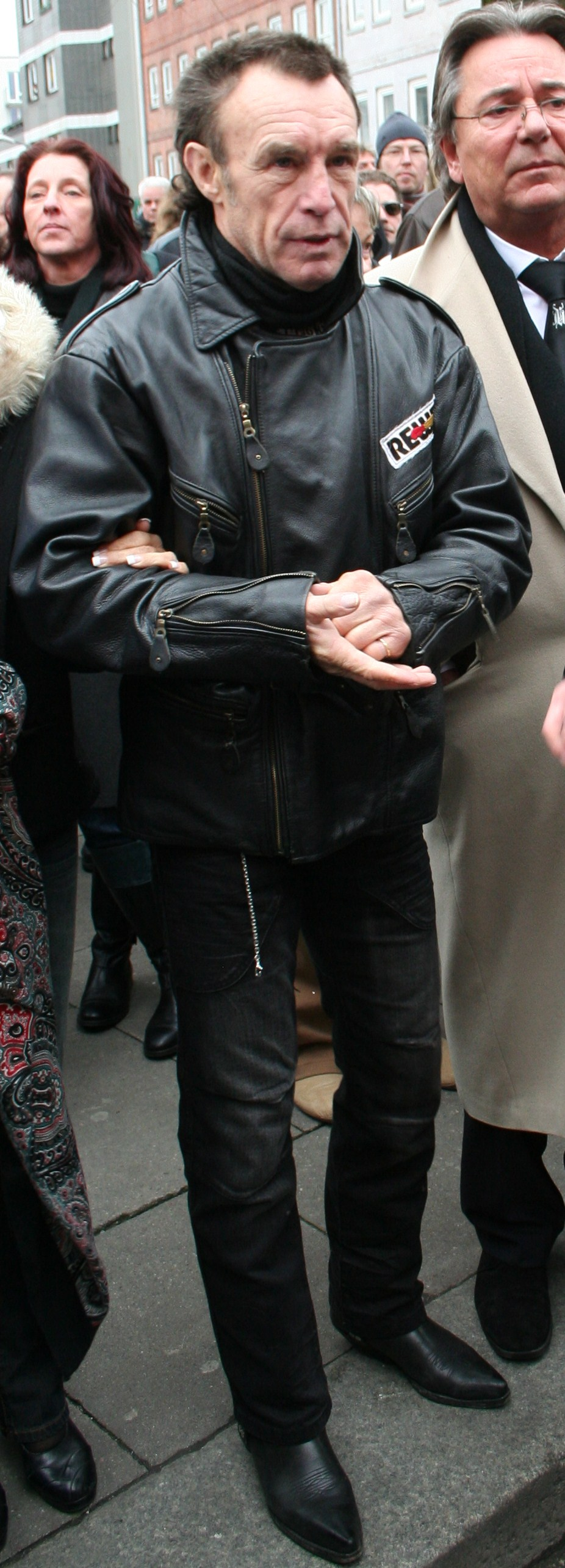
- Weller in 2009

Personal information
- Nationality: German
- Born: 21 November 1953 Pforzheim, Baden-Württemberg, West Germany
- Died: 22 August 2023 (aged 69)

Sport
- Sport: Boxing
Medal record
Men's amateur boxing
Representing West Germany
World Championships
Bronze medal – third place	1978 Belgrade	Lightweight
World Cup
Bronze medal – third place	1979 New York	Lightweight
European Championships
Bronze medal – third place	1977 Halle	Lightweight
Silver medal – second place	1979 Cologne	Lightweight

René Weller (21 November 1953 – 22 August 2023) was a German boxer. He competed for West Germany in the men's featherweight event at the 1976 Summer Olympics, defeating Serge Thomas of France before losing to Gheorghe Ciochina of Romania. In 1979 he was runner-up at the European Amateur Championship, losing the final against Viktor Demyanenko from the USSR.

Weller became professional in 1981 and won the German pro title in the lightweight class. He also won the European lightweight title in 1983 and 1988.

Outside of his sport career, he also appeared in some German boxing films such as Macho Man and Ebbies Bluff. He also produced a line of belts and jewelry and modeled for nude photographs in multiple magazines. He also appeared in multiple television shows and had a successful career as a singer. In 1999 was sentenced to seven years in prison for cocaine dealing, dealing stolen goods, and forgery, but was released early in 2003.

Weller went on to found a boxing gym in his hometown of Pforzheim. He developed dementia in 2014 and died on 22 August 2023 at the age of 69.
