= Ghaedi =

Ghaedi or Ghayedi (Persian: قائدی) is a surname. Notable people with the surname include:

- Behzad Ghaedi (born 1956), Iranian boxer
- Mehdi Ghayedi (born 1998), Iranian football winger and second striker
- Mohammad Ghaedi (born 1992), Iranian Muay Thai kickboxer
