= 1974 World Amateur Boxing Championships =

Boxing competitions

1974 AIBA World Boxing Championships
- Venue: Coliseo de la Ciudad Deportiva
- Location: Havana, Cuba
- Start date: August 17, 1974
- End date: August 30, 1974
- Competitors: 274 from 45 nations

The Men's 1974 World Amateur Boxing Championships were held in Havana, Cuba from August 17 to 30. The first edition of this competition, held two years before the Summer Olympics in Montreal, Quebec, Canada, was organised by the world governing body for amateur boxing AIBA. A total number of 274 boxers from 45 countries entered.

== Medal table ==
Rank	Nation	Gold	Silver	Bronze	Total
1	Cuba	5	1	2	8
2	Soviet Union	2	2	4	8
3	United States	1	2	1	4
4	Yugoslavia	1	0	2	3
5	Puerto Rico	1	0	1	2
5	Uganda	1	0	1	2
7	Romania (ROU)	0	2	1	3
8	Venezuela (VEN)	0	2	0	2
9	Bulgaria (BUL)	0	1	1	2
10	Kenya	0	1	0	1
11	East Germany	0	0	3	3
12	France	0	0	1	1
12	Ghana	0	0	1	1
12	Nigeria	0	0	1	1
12	Panama	0	0	1	1
12	Poland	0	0	1	1
12	Spain (ESP)	0	0	1	1
Totals (17 entries)		11	11	22	44

== Medal winners ==
Event	Gold	Silver	Bronze
Light Flyweight (– 48 kilograms)	Jorge Hernández; Cuba	Stephen Muchoki; Kenya	Enrique Rodríguez; Spain Yevgeni Yudin; Soviet Union
Flyweight (– 51 kilograms)	Douglas Rodríguez; Cuba	Alfredo Pérez; Venezuela	Vladislav Zasypko; Soviet Union Constantin Gruiescu; Romania
Bantamweight (– 54 kilograms)	Wilfredo Gómez; Puerto Rico	Luis Jorge Romero; Cuba	Aldo Cosentino; France David Torosyan; Soviet Union
Featherweight (– 57 kilograms)	Howard Davis; United States	Boris Kuznetsov; Soviet Union	Mariano Álvarez; Cuba Rigoberto Garibaldi; Panama
Lightweight (– 60 kilograms)	Vassily Solomin; Soviet Union	Simion Cuţov; Romania	Luis Echaide; Cuba José Luis Vellon; Puerto Rico
Light Welterweight (– 63,5 kilograms)	Ayub Kalule; Uganda	Vladimir Kolev; Bulgaria	Ulrich Beyer; East Germany Amon Kotey; Ghana
Welterweight (– 67 kilograms)	Emilio Correa; Cuba	Clinton Jackson; United States	Plamen Yankov; Bulgaria Zbigniew Kicka; Poland
Light Middleweight (– 71 kilograms)	Rolando Garbey; Cuba	Alfredo Lemus; Venezuela	Anatoliy Klimanov; Soviet Union Joseph Nsubuga; Uganda
Middleweight (– 75 kilograms)	Rufat Riskiyev; Soviet Union	Alec Năstac; Romania	Bernd Wittenburg; East Germany (Socialist Federal Republic of Yugoslavia) Dragomir Vujković; Yugoslavia
Light Heavyweight (– 81 kilograms)	(Socialist Federal Republic of Yugoslavia) Mate Parlov; Yugoslavia	Oleg Korotaev; Soviet Union	Ottomar Sachse; East Germany Leon Spinks; United States
Heavyweight (> 81 kilograms)	Teófilo Stevenson; Cuba	Marvin Stinson; United States	Fatai Ayinla; Nigeria (Socialist Federal Republic of Yugoslavia) Rajko Miljić; Yugoslavia
