= Kazimierz Adach =

Polish boxer (born 1957)

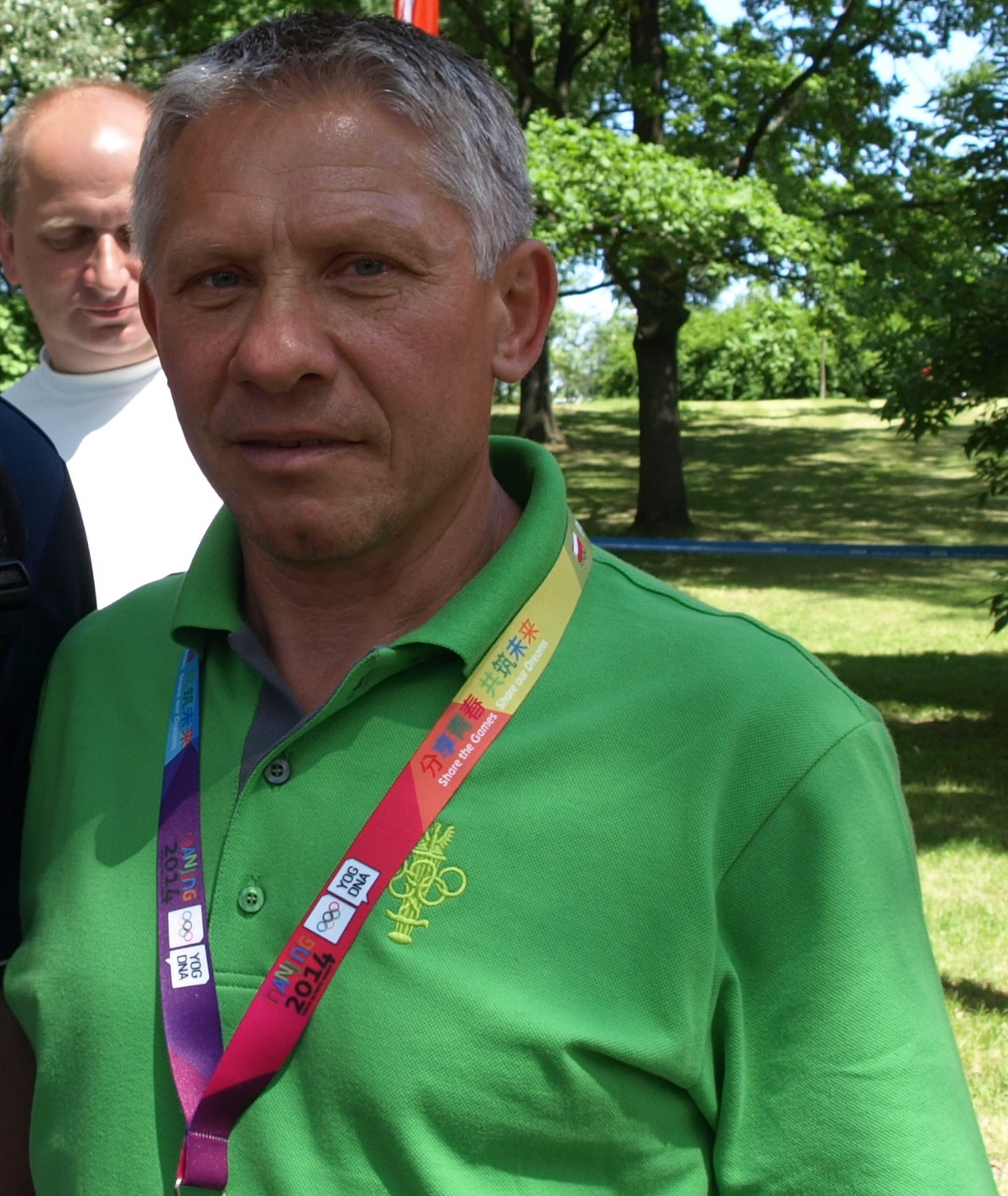

Medal record

Men's amateur boxing

Representing Poland

Olympic Games
Bronze medal – third place	1980 Moscow	Lightweight

Kazimierz Piotr Adach (born 9 May 1957 in Ustka) is a retired boxer from Poland, who won the bronze medal in the lightweight division (– 60 kg) at the 1980 Summer Olympics in Moscow, Soviet Union. In the semifinals he was beaten by eventual gold medalist Ángel Herrera of Cuba.

== 1980 Olympic results ==
Below are the results of Kazimierz Adach, a lightweight boxer from Poland who competed at the 1980 Olympics in Moscow:

- Round of 32: Defeated Bounphisith Songkhamphou (Laos) referee stopped contest in second round
- Round of 16: Defeated Omari Golaya (Tanzania) by decision, 5-0
- Quarterfinal: Defeated Florian Livadaru (Romania) referee stopped contest in third round
- Semifinal: Lost to Ángel Herrera (Cuba) by decision, 0-5 (was awarded bronze medal)
