= Mbarek Zarrougui =

Moroccan boxer

Personal information
- Nationality: Moroccan
- Born: 19 May 1954 (age 70); Morocco
- Height: 166 cm (5 ft 5 in)
- Weight: 51 kg (112 lb)

Sport
- Country: Morocco
- Sport: Boxing

Mbarek Zarrougui (born 19 May 1954) is a Moroccan Olympic boxer. He represented his country in the flyweight division at the 1976 Summer Olympics. He lost his first match against Vicente Rodríguez.

== 1976 Olympic results ==
Below is the record of Mbarek Zarrougui, a Moroccan flyweight boxer who competed at the 1976 Montreal Olympics:

- Round of 64: bye
- Round of 32: lost to Vicente Rodríguez (Spain) referee stopped contest in the second round
