= Somchai =

- Gender: Male

Origin
- Origin: Thai
- Meaning: For สมชาย, it means "Real man", "Manliness".

Somchai (Thai: สมชาย, pronounced [sǒm.tɕʰāːj]) is a Thai given name used by males. It is the most common male given name in Thailand, with 240,000 persons using the name in 2012.

Persons with the given name Somchai include:

- Somchai Chantarasamrit, cyclist
- Somchai Chanthavanij, sports shooter
- Somchai Chimlum, boxer
- Somchai Chuayboonchum, football manager, and former footballer
- Somchai Khunpluem, politician and mob boss
- Somchai Limpichat, swimmer
- Somchai Maiwilai, football manager
- Somchai Putapibarn, boxer
- Somlek Sakdikul, also known as Somchai, Thai film actor
- Somchai Singmanee, footballer
- Somchai Subpherm, football coach
- Somchai Thingpakdee, sports shooter
- Somchai Neelapaijit, human rights activist
- Somchai Wongsawat, former Prime Minister of Thailand
- Somchai Chaiyasut (died 1985), the accused mastermind of the bombing of Cathay Pacific Flight 700Z

In addition to สมชาย, a few other similar-sounding Thai names are also transcribed as Somchai. These include สมชัย, สมไชย, สมไชย์, etc., which are pronounced [sǒm.tɕʰāj], with a short second syllable.

Persons with the name Somchai (สมชัย) include:

- Somchai Katanyutanon, cartoonist writing under the pen name Chai Rachawat
- Somchai Lyowarin, the birth name of Win Lyovarin, Thai novelist/writer
