= David Torosyan =

Russian boxer

Personal information
- Born: September 23, 1950 (age 75) Yerevan, Armenian SSR, Soviet Union
Medal record
Men's Boxing
Representing Soviet Union
Olympic Games
| Bronze medal – third place | 1976 Montreal | Flyweight |
World Amateur Championships
| Bronze medal – third place | 1974 Havana | Bantamweight |

David Torosyan (Armenian: Դավիթ Թորոսյան, born September 23, 1950, in Yerevan, Armenian SSR) is a retired Olympic medalist boxer for the Soviet Union of Armenian descent.

Torosyan trained at Փանոս Թերլեմեզյանի անվան գեղարվեստի պետական քոլեջ in his hometown of Yerevan. He became well known after winning the Soviet Youth Championships gold medal and European Junior Championships silver medal in 1970. Torosyan joined the USSR national boxing team shortly afterward.

After joining the Soviet national boxing team, Torosyan won a bronze medal at the 1974 World Amateur Boxing Championships. He was selected by the Soviet Olympic team to compete at the 1976 Summer Olympics. Torosyan advanced to the semifinals with relative ease, but was then controversially disqualified for a low blow. He won an Olympic bronze medal.

Torosyan worked as a boxing coach in Armenia after retiring from his boxing career. He later emigrated to the United States, settling in Glendale, California, where he opened a gym. Torosyan coached Armenian-born American boxer Vanes Martirosyan, who competed at the 2004 Summer Olympics.

== 1976 Olympic Games Results ==
- Round of 64: bye
- Round of 32: Defeated Hassen Sheriff (Ethiopia) WO
- Round of 16: Defeated Giovanni Camputaro (Italy) RSC 2
- Quarterfinal: Defeated Jong Jo-Ung (North Korea) 5–0
- Semifinal: Lost to Ramón Duvalón (Cuba) DQ 2 (was awarded bronze medal)
