= Clarence Robinson =

Clarence Robinson may refer to:

- Clarence Robison (1923–2006), track athlete and coach at Brigham Young University
- Clarence Robinson (boxer) (born 1949), Jamaican boxer
- Clarence B. Robinson (1911–2002), Tennessee politician
- Clarence Robinson (long jumper), winner of the 1965 NCAA DI outdoor long jump and triple jump titles
