= Pinit Boonjoung =

Thai boxer

Personal information
- Nationality: Thai
- Born: 25 November 1954 (age 70)

Sport
- Sport: Boxing

Pinit Boonjoung (born 25 November 1954) is a Thai boxer. He competed in the men's featherweight event at the 1976 Summer Olympics. At the 1976 Summer Olympics, he lost in his first fight to Choon Gil-Choi of South Korea.
