= Anatoly Volkov =

Russian boxer

Personal information
- Nationality: Russian
- Born: 23 December 1952 (age 73) Moscow, Russia

Sport
- Sport: Boxing

Anatoly Aleksandrovich Volkov (Russian: Анато́лий Алекса́ндрович Во́лков; born 23 December 1952) is a Russian boxer. He competed in the men's featherweight event at the 1976 Summer Olympics. At the 1976 Summer Olympics, he lost to Dave Armstrong of the United States.
