= Ramón Duvalón =

Cuban boxer (born 1954)

Personal information
- Full name: Ramón Duvalón Carrión
- Nationality: Cuba
- Born: August 31, 1954 (age 72)
- Height: 1.67 m (5 ft 6 in)
- Weight: 51 kg (112 lb)

Sport
- Sport: Boxing
- Weight class: Flyweight
Medal record
Olympic Games
Silver medal – second place	1976 Montreal	Flyweight
Pan American Games
Gold medal – first place	Mexico City 1975	Flyweight

Ramón Duvalón (born August 31, 1954) is a retired boxer from Cuba, who represented his native country at the 1976 Summer Olympics in Montreal, Quebec, Canada. There he won the silver medal in the flyweight division (– 51 kg) after being defeated in the final by United States-boxer Leo Randolph. A year earlier he captured the gold at the 1975 Pan American Games.

== Olympic results ==
- 1st round bye
- Defeated Souley Hancaradu (Nigeria) walk-over, country boycotted over New Zealand
- Defeated Toshinori Koga (Japan) 5–0
- Defeated Ian Clyde (Canada) 5–0
- Defeated David Torosyan (Soviet Union) DQ 2
- Lost to Leo Randolph (United States) 2-3
