= 1978 World Amateur Boxing Championships =

Boxing competitions

1978 AIBA World Boxing Championships
- Location: Belgrade, Yugoslavia
- Start date: May 6, 1978
- End date: May 20, 1978

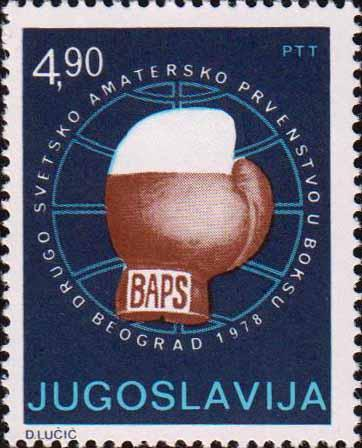
A stamp of Yugoslavia dedicated to the 1978 World Amateur Boxing Championships

The Men's 1978 World Amateur Boxing Championships were held in Belgrade, Yugoslavia from May 6 to 20. The second edition of this competition, held two years before the Summer Olympics in Moscow, Soviet Union was organised by the world governing body for amateur boxing AIBA.

== Medal table ==
Rank	Nation	Gold	Silver	Bronze	Total
1	Cuba (CUB)	5	3	0	8
2	Soviet Union (URS)	3	1	2	6
3	Poland (POL)	1	0	2	3
4	Kenya (KEN)	1	0	0	1
4	Nigeria (NGR)	1	0	0	1
6	Yugoslavia (YUG)	0	6	1	7
7	Finland (FIN)	0	1	0	1
8	East Germany (GDR)	0	0	5	5
9	Venezuela (VEN)	0	0	3	3
10	Bulgaria (BUL)	0	0	2	2
10	United States (USA)	0	0	2	2
10	West Germany (FRG)	0	0	2	2
13	France (FRA)	0	0	1	1
13	Japan (JPN)	0	0	1	1
13	South Korea (KOR)	0	0	1	1
Totals (15 entries)		11	11	22	44

== Medal winners ==
Event	Gold	Silver	Bronze
Light Flyweight (– 48 kilograms)	Stephen Muchoki; Kenya	Jorge Hernández; Cuba	Armando Guevara; Venezuela Richard Sandoval; United States
Flyweight (– 51 kilograms)	Henryk Średnicki; Poland	Héctor Ramírez; Cuba	Alexander Mikhailov; Soviet Union Ishi Koki; Japan
Bantamweight (– 54 kilograms)	Adolfo Horta; Cuba	(Socialist Federal Republic of Yugoslavia) Fazlija Šaćirović; Yugoslavia	Stephan Förster; East Germany Chung Kim Chil; South Korea
Featherweight (– 57 kilograms)	Ángel Herrera; Cuba	(Socialist Federal Republic of Yugoslavia) Bratislav Ristić; Yugoslavia	Roman Gotfryd; Poland Antonio Esparragoza; Venezuela
Lightweight (– 60 kilograms)	Davidson Andeh; Nigeria	Vladimir Sorokin; Soviet Union	René Weller; West Germany Lutz Käsebier; East Germany
Light Welterweight (– 63,5 kilograms)	Valery Lvov; Soviet Union	(Socialist Federal Republic of Yugoslavia) Memet Bogujevci; Yugoslavia	Jean-Claude Ruiz; France Karl-Heinz Krüger; East Germany
Welterweight (– 67 kilograms)	Valery Rachkov; Soviet Union	(Socialist Federal Republic of Yugoslavia) Miodrag Perunović; Yugoslavia	Roosevelt Green; United States Ernst Müller; West Germany
Light Middleweight (– 71 kilograms)	Viktor Savchenko; Soviet Union	Luis Martínez; Cuba	Jerzy Rybicki; Poland Ilya Ilyev; Bulgaria
Middleweight (– 75 kilograms)	José Gómez Mustelier; Cuba	Tarmo Uusivirta; Finland	(Socialist Federal Republic of Yugoslavia) Slobodan Kačar; Yugoslavia Ilya Angelov; Bulgaria
Light Heavyweight (– 81 kilograms)	Sixto Soria; Cuba	(Socialist Federal Republic of Yugoslavia) Tadija Kačar; Yugoslavia	Nikolay Erofyeev; Soviet Union Herbert Bauch; East Germany
Heavyweight (> 81 kilograms)	Teófilo Stevenson; Cuba	(Socialist Federal Republic of Yugoslavia) Dragomir Vujković; Yugoslavia	Carlos Rivera; Venezuela Jürgen Fanghänel; East Germany
