= Rufat Riskiyev =

Soviet boxer (1949–2026)

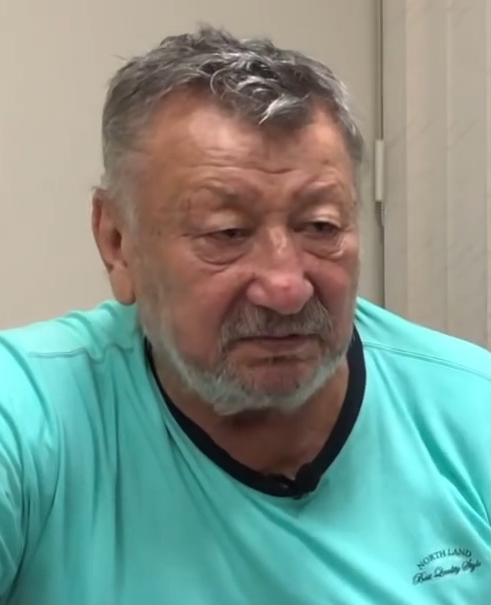
- Riskiyev in 2020

Medal record

Representing Soviet Union

Men's Boxing

Olympic Games
Silver medal – second place	1976 Montreal	Middleweight

World Amateur Championships
Gold medal – first place	1974 Havana	Middleweight

Rufat Asadovich Riskiyev (Russian: Руфат Асадович Рискиев, Uzbek: Rufat Risqiyev; 2 October 1949 – 15 August 2026) was an Uzbek boxer, who represented the USSR at the 1976 Summer Olympics in Montreal, Quebec, Canada. There he won the silver medal in the middleweight division (– 75 kg). In the final he was defeated by United States youngster Michael Spinks, after the referee had to stop the contest in the third round.

Two years earlier, at the inaugural 1974 World Championships in Havana, Cuba, Riskiyev won the world title. He trained at the Dynamo sports society.

Riskiyev died on 15 August 2026, at the age of 76.

== 1976 Olympic results ==
Below is the record of Rufat Riskiyev, a middleweight boxer from the Soviet Union who competed at the 1976 Montreal Olympics:

- Round of 32: Defeated Jorma Taipale (Finland) KO 3
- Round of 16: Defeated Ilya Dimitrov (Bulgaria) by decision, 5–0
- Quarterfinal: Defeated Siraj-ud-Din (Pakistan) RSC 3
- Semifinal: Defeated Luis Martínez (Cuba) by decision, 3–2
- Final: Lost to Michael Spinks (United States) RSC 3 (was awarded silver medal)
