= Julio Guzman (boxer) =

Puerto Rican boxer

Personal information
- Nationality: Puerto Rican
- Born: 4 June 1957 (age 69)

Sport
- Sport: Boxing

Julio Guzman (born 4 June 1957) is a Puerto Rican boxer. He competed in the men's flyweight event at the 1976 Summer Olympics. At the 1976 Summer Olympics, he lost in his first fight to Fazlija Šaćirović of Yugoslavia.
