= Tibor Dezamits =

Hungarian boxer (born 1954)

Personal information
- Nationality: Hungarian
- Born: 7 November 1954 (age 70); Kapuvár, Hungary

Sport
- Sport: Boxing

Tibor Dezamits (born 7 November 1954) is a Hungarian boxer. He competed in the men's lightweight event at the 1980 Summer Olympics. At the 1980 Summer Olympics, he defeated Alphonse Matoubela of Congo, before losing to Yordan Lesov of Bulgaria.
