= Nicolás Arredondo =

Nicolás Arredondo may refer to:

- Nicolás Antonio de Arredondo (1726–1802), Spanish soldier and politician
- Nicolás Arredondo (boxer) (1950–1987), Mexican boxer
