= Bryan Gibson =

Canadian boxer

Personal information
- Born: Kentville, Nova Scotia
- Occupation: Boxer

Boxing career

Bryan Gibson (born November 10, 1947, in Kentville, Nova Scotia) is a former Canadian boxer, who represented Canada at the 1976 Summer Olympics, and is the first boxer of African descent from Nova Scotia to compete in the Olympics.

He now coaches the Evangaline Trail Amateur Boxing Club in his hometown of Kentville. He has coached a variety of amateur boxers including some amateur national champions and a gold medallist at the most recent Canada Games. He is also a bus driver for the Annapolis Valley Regional School Board in Nova Scotia, Canada.

== Amateur boxing career ==
Gibson fought at the 1973 Western New York Golden Gloves Boxing Tournament. In 1974, he won the Canadian National Amateur Boxing Championships in the 178 pounds division, and in 1975 he won another national amateur boxing title. He beat Ernie Barr in the 1975 North American 178-pound amateur championship bout at the Miami Marine Stadium. He qualified for the 1975 Pan American Games in Mexico City as a light-heavyweight boxer, but he lost in the preliminary round.

The Kentville native represented Team Canada in the men's middleweight division at the 1976 Summer Olympics. He was defeated by Bernd Wittenburg of East Germany at 75 kilograms.

== 1976 Olympic record ==
Below are the results of Bryan Gibson, a Canadian middleweight boxer who competed at the 1976 Montreal Olympics:

- Round of 32: lost to Bernd Wittenburg (East Germany) by a third-round knockout.

== Honors and awards ==
- 1974 Canadian National Amateur Boxing Champion. (1974)
- 1975 Canadian National Amateur Boxing Champion. (1975)
- 1975 North American Amateur Boxing Champion. (1975)
- 1975 Pan American Games participant. (1975)
- 1976 Summer Olympics participant. (1976)
- Inductee of the Canadian Boxing Hall of Fame. (1991)
- Honored with a mural in Kentville.
