= Jean-Pierre Malavasi =

French boxer

Personal information
- Nationality: French
- Born: 5 August 1949 (age 75)

Sport
- Sport: Boxing

Jean-Pierre Malavasi (born 5 August 1949) is a French boxer. He competed in the men's middleweight event at the 1976 Summer Olympics.
