= Ilian Dimitrov =

Bulgarian boxer

Personal information
- Nationality: Bulgarian
- Born: 22 February 1953 (age 72)

Sport
- Sport: Boxing

Ilian Dimitrov (Bulgarian: Илиян Димитров, born 22 February 1953) is a Bulgarian boxer. He competed in the men's middleweight event at the 1976 Summer Olympics. At the 1976 Summer Olympics, he lost to Rufat Riskiyev of the Soviet Union.
