= Bernd Wittenburg =

German boxer

Medal record

Men's boxing

Representing East Germany

World Championships
Bronze medal – third place	1974 Havana	Middleweight

European Championships
Silver medal – second place	1975 Katowice	Middleweight
Silver medal – second place	1977 Halle	Middleweight

Bernd Wittenburg (born 1 April 1950 in Neukloster) is an East German former middleweight boxer who competed at the 1976 Montreal Olympics and who won titles for the SC Dynamo Berlin / Sportvereinigung (SV) Dynamo. He won the GDR Championships in boxing in 1972, 1973, 1974, 1975 and 1976.

== 1976 Olympic results ==
- Round of 32: defeated Bryan Gibson (Canada) by a third-round knockout
- Round of 16: lost to Luis Martínez (Cuba) by decision, 2-3
