= Clarence Robinson (boxer) =

Jamaican boxer (born 1949)

Personal information
- Nationality: Jamaican
- Born: 23 September 1949 (age 75)

Sport
- Sport: Boxing

Clarence Robinson (born 23 September 1949) is a Jamaican boxer. He competed in the men's featherweight event at the 1976 Summer Olympics. At the 1976 Summer Olympics, he lost to Choi Chung-il of South Korea.
