= Rigoberto Garibaldi =

Panamanian boxer and boxing coach (born 1956)

Personal information
- Nationality: Panama
- Born: 27 December 1956 (age 69) El Maranon, Panama

Boxing career
Medal record
Men's amateur boxing
Representing Panama
Central American and Caribbean Championships
Gold medal – first place	1974 Caracas	57 kg
World Championships
Bronze medal – third place	1974 Havana	Featherweight

Rigoberto Garibaldi (born 27 December 1956) is a Panamanian boxer and boxing coach.

== Life and career ==
Garibaldi was born in El Maranon.

Garibaldi competed at the 1974 Central American and Caribbean Games, winning the gold medal in the 57 kg event. He also competed at the 1974 World Amateur Boxing Championships, winning the bronze medal in the featherweight event.

Garibaldi was president of the National Affiliate of Boxing Trainers during the 2000s.
