= Frank Cedeno =

Filipino boxer

Personal information
- Nationality: Filipino
- Born: Franklin Sedenio; March 16, 1958 (age 68) Talisay, Cebu, Philippines
- Height: 5 ft 3 1/2 in (161 cm)
- Weight: Flyweight; Super flyweight

Boxing career
- Stance: Southpaw

Boxing record
- Total fights: 56
- Wins: 43
- Win by KO: 23
- Losses: 10
- Draws: 3

Frank Cedeno (born March 16, 1958) is a Filipino former professional boxer in the Flyweight division.

== Professional boxing career ==
Cedeno made his professional debut in 1976, losing to Ray De los Santos via eight round points decision. After 7 years with 38 fights, Cedeno finally got his chance to fight for the world championship. In September 1983, Cedeno knocked out Charlie Magri in the sixth round to claim the WBC and Lineal Flyweight titles.

On January 18, 1984, Cedeno made his first title defence against Koji Kobayashi in Japan and lost via second-round TKO. He retired in 1988 with a record of 43 wins with 23 KOs, 10 losses and 3 draws.

== Professional boxing record ==
56 fights	43 wins	10 losses
By knockout	23	1
By decision	20	9
Draws	3	

No.	Result	Record	Opponent	Type	Round, time	Date	Location	Notes
56	Loss	43–10–3	Young Chun Min	TD	5 (10)	1988-03-27	88 Gymnasium, Seoul, South Korea	
55	Win	43–9–3	Ernie Cataluna	PTS	10 (10)	1988-01-30	Manila, Philippines	
54	Loss	42–9–3	Thanomsak Sithbaobay	UD	10 (10)	1987-12-14	Bangkok, Thailand	
53	Win	42–8–3	Poker Perigrino	PTS	10 (10)	1987-10-31	Canlaon, Philippines	
52	Loss	41–8–3	Gilberto Román	UD	12 (12)	1987-03-20	Plaza de Toros Calafia, Mexicali, Mexico	For WBC super-flyweight title
51	Win	41–7–3	Flash Jagdon	KO	6 (10)	1986-11-29	Ozamiz, Philippines	
50	Win	40–7–3	Fel Malatag	KO	7 (?)	1986-08-16	Toledo, Philippines	
49	Win	39–7–3	Leo Ravalo	KO	6 (?)	1985-12-20	Philippines	
48	Win	38–7–3	Yuenyong Sithprasong	KO	5 (10)	1985-10-06	Samrong Stadium, Samut Prakan, Thailand	
47	Win	37–7–3	Hugo Partida	UD	10 (10)	1985-07-19	U.L.T.R.A. Arena, Pasig, Philippines	
46	Win	36–7–3	Lito Zardo	TKO	6 (10)	1985-05-26	Baguio College Foundation Gym, Baguio, Philippines	
45	Win	35–7–3	Zaldy Adrayan	TKO	2 (?)	1985-04-11	Philippines	
44	Win	34–7–3	Makoto Taguchi	TKO	3 (10)	1985-03-01	Rizal Memorial Coliseum, Manila, Philippines	
43	Win	33–7–3	Chong Suk Kim	TKO	7 (?)	1984-11-15	Manila, Philippines	
42	Win	32–7–3	Nestor Miraflor	KO	1 (10)	1984-06-23	Baguio, Philippines	
41	Loss	31–7–3	Kōji Kobayashi	TKO	2 (12)	1984-01-18	Korakuen Hall, Tokyo, Japan	Lost WBC and The Ring flyweight titles
40	Win	31–6–3	Charlie Magri	TKO	6 (12)	1983-09-27	Wembley Arena, London, England, U.K.	Won WBC and The Ring flyweight titles
39	Win	30–6–3	Ok Kyun Yuh	PTS	10 (10)	1983-07-03	Munhwa Gymnasium, Seoul, South Korea	
38	Win	29–6–3	Bobby Williams	TKO	4 (?)	1983-03-18	Araneta Coliseum, Quezon City, Philippines	
37	Win	28–6–3	Allan Makitoki	TKO	6 (12)	1983-01-21	Eduardo's Nightclub, Parañaque, Philippines	Retained Filipino (GAB) flyweight title
36	Win	27–6–3	Chan Soo Jung	PTS	10 (10)	1982-11-26	Araneta Coliseum, Quezon City, Philippines	
35	Loss	26–6–3	William Develos	PTS	10 (10)	1982-08-14	Elorde Sports Center, Parañaque, Philippines	
34	Loss	26–5–3	Hong Soo Yang	PTS	12 (12)	1982-06-27	Wonju, South Korea	For OPBF flyweight title
33	Win	26–4–3	Jong Chul Park	TKO	8 (?)	1982-03-27	Cuneta Astrodome, Pasay, Philippines	
32	Draw	25–4–3	Ramon Chan	PTS	12 (12)	1982-01-23	Baguio, Philippines	Retained Filipino (GAB) flyweight title
31	Win	25–4–2	Ver Libradilla	UD	10 (10)	1981-12-20	Cebu Coliseum, Cebu City, Philippines	
30	Win	24–4–2	Ric Diamale	PTS	10 (10)	1981-07-04	Cebu Coliseum, Cebu City, Philippines	
29	Win	23–4–2	Dan Pisanchai	PTS	10 (10)	1981-05-02	Philippines	
28	Win	22–4–2	Lito Cortez	TKO	7 (12)	1981-02-19	Rizal Memorial Coliseum, Manila, Philippines	Won vacant Filipino (Historic) flyweight title
27	Win	21–4–2	Brigildo Canada	PTS	10 (10)	1980-11-29	Davao City, Philippines	
26	Win	20–4–2	Montsayarm Haw Mahachai	TKO	7 (?)	1980-09-17	Pasay, Philippines	
25	Win	19–4–2	Siony Carupo	PTS	12 (12)	1980-07-16	Eduardo's Nightclub, Parañaque, Philippines	Retained Filipino (GAB) flyweight title
24	Win	18–4–2	Arnel Arrozal	MD	10 (10)	1980-05-16	Rizal Memorial Coliseum, Manila, Philippines	
23	Win	17–4–2	Melchor Degsi	PTS	12 (12)	1980-03-29	Baguio, Philippines	Won vacant Filipino (GAB) flyweight title
22	Win	16–4–2	Flash Jagdon	KO	5 (?)	1979-12-23	Cebu Coliseum, Cebu City, Philippines	
21	Win	15–4–2	Pablo Pepito	PTS	10 (10)	1979-10-05	Rizal Memorial Coliseum, Manila, Philippines	
20	Win	14–4–2	Wilson Castillon	TKO	8 (10)	1979-07-09	Iloilo City, Philippines	
19	Win	13–4–2	Robinson Abato	UD	10 (10)	1979-06-15	Rizal Memorial Coliseum, Manila, Philippines	
18	Loss	12–4–2	William Develos	PTS	10 (10)	1979-05-26	Calauag, Philippines	
17	Win	12–3–2	Lino Boy Base	SD	10 (10)	1979-04-20	Rizal Memorial Coliseum, Manila, Philippines	
16	Win	11–3–2	Franco Torregoza	PTS	10 (10)	1979-02-23	Manila, Philippines	
15	Loss	10–3–2	Eric Blancia	PTS	10 (10)	1978-11-30	Philippines	
14	Win	10–2–2	Brigildo Canada	TKO	7 (?)	1978-11-04	Quezon City, Philippines	
13	Win	9–2–2	Little Aguilar	UD	10 (10)	1978-09-13	Quezon City, Philippines	
12	Win	8–2–2	Henry Balina	TKO	4 (?)	1978-06-18	GTV Channel 4, Quezon City, Philippines	
11	Win	7–2–2	Jun Aguilar	TKO	8 (?)	1978-04-29	Zamboanga City, Philippines	
10	Win	6–2–2	Fred Villanueva	TKO	6 (?)	1978-04-01	Philippines	
9	Win	5–2–2	Peter Noble	PTS	10 (10)	1977-12-02	Philippines	
8	Win	4–2–2	George Nunal	PTS	10 (10)	1977-10-15	Philippines	
7	Loss	3–2–2	Glen Orlanes	TD	8 (?)	1977-07-03	Philippines	
6	Win	3–1–2	Salvador Perez	PTS	10 (10)	1977-06-18	Philippines	
5	Win	2–1–2	Jonathan Angel	TKO	8 (?)	1977-05-14	Philippines	
4	Draw	1–1–2	Ray De los Santos	PTS	8 (8)	1977-02-26	Philippines	
3	Win	1–1–1	Pete Arda	TKO	6 (?)	1977-01-29	Cebu City, Philippines	
2	Draw	0–1–1	Eduardo Davuno	PTS	8 (8)	1977-01-05	Cagayan de Oro, Philippines	
1	Loss	0–1	Ray De los Santos	PTS	8 (8)	1976-11-20	Philippines	

== See also ==
- List of southpaw stance boxers
- Lineal championship
- List of Filipino boxing world champions
- List of world flyweight boxing champions

Sporting positions
Regional boxing titles
Vacant Title last held by Arnel Arrozal	Filipino (GAB) flyweight champion March 29, 1980 – September 27, 1983; Won world title	Vacant Title next held by Ric Barimbad
Vacant Title last held by Ric Magramo	Filipino (Historic) flyweight champion February 19, 1981 – September 27, 1983; Won world title	Vacant Title next held by Titing Dignos
World boxing titles
Preceded by Charlie Magri	WBC flyweight champion September 27, 1983 – January 18, 1984	Succeeded by Kōji Kobayashi
Preceded by Charlie Magri	The Ring flyweight champion September 27, 1983 – January 18, 1984	Succeeded by Kōji Kobayashi
