= Fernando Martins =

Brazilian boxer (born 1952)

Personal information
- Born: 15 August 1952 (age 73) São Paulo, Brazil

Sport
- Sport: Boxing
Medal record
Men's amateur boxing
Representing Brazil
Pan American Games
Silver medal – second place	1975 Mexico City	Middleweight

Fernando Martins (born 15 August 1952) is a Brazilian boxer. He competed in the men's middleweight event at the 1976 Summer Olympics. He also won a bronze medal at the 1975 Pan American Games in the middleweight event.
