= Nicolás Arredondo (boxer) =

Mexican boxer (1950–1987)

Personal information
- Nationality: Mexican
- Born: 17 March 1950
- Died: 1987 (aged 36–37)

Sport
- Sport: Boxing
Medal record
Men's amateur boxing
Representing Mexico
Pan American Games
Bronze medal – third place	1975 Mexico City	Middleweight

Nicolás Arredondo (17 March 1950 – 1987) was a Mexican boxer. He competed in the men's middleweight event at the 1976 Summer Olympics. At the 1976 Summer Olympics, he lost to Siraj Din of Pakistan.
