= Orpington Boxing Club =

British amateur boxing club

- Full name: Orpington & District Amateur Boxing Club
- Sport: Boxing
- Founded: 1912
- Based in: Orpington, London, England
- Location: 15 Chatsworth Parade, Petts Wood

Orpington & District Amateur Boxing Club is an amateur boxing club (ABC) in Kent. Established in 1912 as the Orpington Lads Club by the St. Mary Cray Scout Troop, the club aims to support underprivileged young men in the Orpington area. Orpington & District Amateur Boxing Club is one of the original 16 clubs that formed the Kent Amateur Boxing Association in 1948.

== History ==
The club has met in various locations, and now has a gym in Petts Wood. Orpington has records dating back to 1895 at the village hall.

In 1936, Jack Doyle built a boxing centre in Orpington on Lagoon Road, playing a pivotal part in the development of Orpington ABC. In 1936, the British Olympic Boxing team, Team GB, trained at the centre. Amateur boxers from Orpington & District ABC helped assist in the training.

Orpington & District ABC has produced amateur champions. Some of these include Jimmy Cable, Albert Hillman, who fought Kirkland Laing, Simon Grix, Chris Genkins and Mark Baker. Prior to 1974, the club had garnered the highest number of Kent, Southern Counties, and London Champions titles. From 1962 to 1980, Orpington & District ABC won a record number of schoolboy titles in Kent. The club also hosted the Kent and Southern Counties schoolboy championships at the RoseCroft Club. The club competed in the South East Divisional championships and has won multiple London titles.

In 1986, the club affiliated with Surrey ABA Southern Counties when it was based in Westerham.

Orpington & District ABC is one of the oldest boxing clubs in Kent and is currently located in Petts Wood. In 1936, the club changed its name from Orpington Lads Club to Orpington & District Amateur Boxing Club under the guidance of former professional boxer Harry Taylor, who introduced the Taylor's Cup.

In 1937, under Harry Taylor's guidance, the club organised various tournaments to raise funds for Cray Wanders Football Club, ensuring its survival during challenging times.

During World War II, the club temporarily closed down. After the war, there were four clubs in Orpington: Cray Valley Boxing Club, Orpington Boys Club, Chelsfield Valley Junior Boxing Club, and Orpington & District Boxing Club, along with Great Elms in Bromley and Bromley Boxing Athletic Club (Bromley ABC).

Harry Taylor, the head coach, helped to organise the development of several boxing clubs, including Cray Valley, Orpington & District ABC, and the Orpington Boys Club. He also contributed to clubs in Bromley, such as Great Elms at Shooters Common (now Bromley Common) and the Bromley Athletic Club, which was located at Hayes Lane, home to Bromley Football Club. Alongside Pat Dowers, Taylor helped manage the Downham & Bromley Club, established in 1938, which fell under the Orpington & District regional association.

In 1950, all of these clubs unified under the name Orpington & District ABC. A constitution was drafted to govern this association, ensuring that all clubs within the borough were affiliated with the Kent Amateur Boxing Association (ABA). This constitution protects the clubs and stipulates that they can only be operated by the committee of Orpington & District ABC.

The club did not gain national success until 1962, when the club re-opened under the leadership of Alf Reilly at St. Joseph's Boys School in Orpington and with Eric Lubbock MP as the president. It later moved to St Mary Cray's Sea Cadet Hall, and then to the Rosecroft Social Club. Eric Lubbock, an Oxford Blue, boxed for Orpington and District ABC, which made headlines in the Daily Mail. Jack Stewart, the then-president of Rosecroft, helped organise various interclub sparring shows, club, regional and national shows, with Coaches Ted Norris and Peter Hugh, holding various Kent Schools, and junior national shows. Stewart introduced his sons, grandson and Larry McGuire to boxing, ensuring the club had a home until he resigned in 1980.

In 1965, the Downham Community Club, which had previously been connected with Orpington ABC through Harry Taylor and Pat Dowers in the 1950s, joined the Orpington ABC Association of clubs due to its closure. Downham Community ABC amalgamated with Orpington & District ABC once again, and a constitution (legal document) was written and agreed upon in 1966, stating that all clubs within the borough moving forward would come under the auspices of the Orpington & District Amateur Boxing Clubs.

Orpington & District ABC has produced amateur champions, including Mick Spencer, five-time national champion and England Representative, Gary Cable, Alan Cable, Johnny Hillman, Albert Hillman, Mark Baker, Robert Mullholland, Robert Stacey, Terry Pearson, P Martin, and Ray Mason.

In 1966, the club successfully raised funds to build the Magpie Hall Lane Youth Centre in Southborough. It briefly operated from the Youth Centre at Magpie Hall Lane in Petts Wood before relocating to the Rosecroft social club in St. Mary's Cray, where it was coached by ex-England international and national champion Mick Spencer.

In 1980, the club moved again, this time behind the Queenshead public house in Green St. Green, with Mick Spencer moving to the Fitzroy Lodge. Ted Norris continued to be the coach. Arthur Davis, a former professional, became the head coach in 1984. Davis was a boxer for Orpington, where he won three southeastern divisional championships.

In 1986, the club merged with the Sir Winston Churchill Boxing Club and the Spitfire Boxing Club in Bigginhill due to a lack of funding and an unsuitable venue. Jimmy Cable served as president, and John Hart as coach during this period. The club continued to produce Southern County champions, such as Robert Stacey and Mark Baker, as well as regional boxers like Neville Smith, Dean Philp, Stephen Birch, Justin Worrel, Ian Tebbit, and Mark Dalton.

The club faced challenges in the 1990s when the Royal Standard pub in Westerham closed, resulting in the closure of all three clubs: Spitfire, Sir Winston Churchill, and Orpington ABC. This led to temporary closures due to a lack of venues and funding.

In 2007, the Cray Valley Boxing Club in Cray Valley briefly reopened, and they relocated to Tillingbourne Green. Their name returned to Orpington & District Amateur Boxing Club. The club produced regional champions under head coach Olly Rutherford, coaches Adam Ballard and Mick Housego, and national finalists and CYP London Champion such as Ernie Rutherford. The club also enjoyed success with Ryan Judd, winning four titles in four weeks, starting with the southeast London junior novice ABA title.

Judd also went on to land the London title. However, the club closed in 2013 due to a lack of funding once again.

The club produced regional boxers and Jack Greenaway, Junior London Champion, Danny McGuire, Olly Lee and Oliver Watson, who is now the club's chairman.

Orpington & District ABC reopened its doors in Petts Wood on 8 April 2024, with a 15-year lease, run by a committee of ex-boxers including ex-national champion Robert Mullholland. The club aims to reopen all clubs they once ran across the borough, including Great Elms & Bromley ABC & Sir Winston Churchill. The club has strong links to Petts Wood, raising funds to build the Magpie youth centre and holding amateur boxing shows in the Daylight Inn and Sports grounds.

Orpington & District Amateur Boxing Club is the only official regulated boxing club affiliated with the National Governing Body England Boxing & Sport England in Petts Wood, and Bromley. The club also has a professional affiliation with the British Boxing Board of Control.

Orpington ABC had six boxers advance to the London Semi-Finals. After opening in April 2024, the club celebrated its first London Champion, George Sheppard, on 29 September 2024. Additionally, Harry Sheppard claimed victory at the NAGBC London Finals on 1 November 2024, becoming a London Champion as well. Orpington & District ABC was the only club in the Bexley and Bromley Boroughs to produce a London Champion in 2024.

In April 2025, Orpington ABC produced another London Champion, Henry Brown, who also reached the semi-finals in May 2025.

Orpington ABC’s sister club, Bromley ABC, was reopened in January 2025. With Castro Collins winning the school national championships in May 2025, this marked the first national title in 27 years in the London Borough of Bromley.

On the 28th September 2025, Orpington ABC produced two London Champions with AJ Parker and Jack Cannon, with its sister club Bromley ABC also producing one London Champion with Harvey Reilly.

The club's motto is 'progredior' (to make progress, advance, develop, proceed, go on).

Today, the club is run by ex-boxers and family members of the original Orpington & District ABC under the affiliation of England Boxing, established in 1880.

== In popular culture ==
In 1965, the Orpington & District Amateur Boxing Club was featured on BBC 1's 6 PM news, showcasing club training with Michael Spencer and Robert Reily.

Orpington & District boxing club is mentioned in The Gifted One biography of Kirkland Laing by Oliver Jarratt and details the bout between Kirkland Laing and Orpington & District ABC Boxer Albert Hillman.

The bout between Chris Genkins of Orpington & District ABC and Charlie Magri is mentioned in the book Champagne Charlie.

Jimmy Cable, the ex-president and former boxer for Orpington & District ABC, is mentioned in Steve Bunce's book, Bunce's Big Fat Short History of British Boxing.

The club is mentioned in Anthony Whatley's book, The Ghost of the Fisher.

Ian Stone's book about the British athlete Alec Nelson, cites the Orpington Village Hall as the location of his bout. The village hall was the location for Orpington boxing club in 1895. Alec boxed Charnock from Orpington ABC.

Michael Spencer, the multi-national champion and England representative, was mentioned in Bob Lonkhurst's book, Fen Tiger: The Success of Dave 'boy' Green

National Champion Castro Collins was interviewed live on ITV News at 6 PM on 22 May 2025.
