= Ryszard Pasiewicz =

Polish boxer

Personal information
- Nationality: Polish
- Born: 4 March 1955 (age 70); Łódź, Poland

Sport
- Sport: Boxing

Ryszard Pasiewicz (born 4 March 1955) is a Polish boxer. He competed in the men's middleweight event at the 1976 Summer Olympics.
