= Somchai Putapibarn =

Thai boxer

Personal information
- Nationality: Thai
- Born: 19 March 1955 (age 70)

Sport
- Sport: Boxing

Somchai Putapibarn (born 19 March 1955) is a Thai boxer. He competed in the men's flyweight event at the 1976 Summer Olympics. At the 1976 Summer Olympics, he lost to Kim Jeong-cheol of South Korea.
