= Muhammad Sadiq (boxer) =

Pakistani boxer (born 1934)

Personal information
- Nationality: Pakistani
- Born: 1 September 1934 (age 90)

Sport
- Sport: Boxing

Muhammad Sadiq (born 1 September 1934) is a Pakistani boxer. He competed in the men's flyweight event at the 1976 Summer Olympics.
