= 1973 European Amateur Boxing Championships =

Boxing competitions

- Host city: Belgrade
- Country: Yugoslavia
- Nations: 22
- Athletes: 148
- Dates: 1–9 June

The 1973 European Amateur Boxing Championships were held in Belgrade, Yugoslavia from 1 to 9 June. The 20th edition of the bi-annual competition was organised by the European governing body for amateur boxing, EABA. There were 148 fighters from 22 countries participating.

== Medal winners ==
Event	Gold	Silver	Bronze
Light Flyweight (– 48 kilograms)	Vladislav Sasypko; Soviet Union	Beyhan Fuchedyev; Bulgaria	John Bambrick; Scotland Enrique Rodríguez; Spain
Flyweight (– 51 kilograms)	Constantin Gruiescu; Romania	Vicente Rodríguez; Spain	Gerd Schubert; West Germany Nikolay Lodin; Soviet Union
Bantamweight (– 54 kilograms)	Aldo Cosentino; France	Mircea Tone; Romania	Krzysztof Madej; Poland Dimitar Milev; Bulgaria
Featherweight (– 57 kilograms)	Stefan Förster; East Germany	(Socialist Federal Republic of Yugoslavia) Zoran Jovanović; Yugoslavia	Gabriel Pometcu; Romania Heikki Vilander; Finland
Lightweight (– 60 kilograms)	Simion Cuţov; Romania	Ryszard Tomczyk; Poland	Wolfgang Schoth; West Germany Günter Radowski; East Germany
Light Welterweight (– 63.5 kilograms)	(Socialist Federal Republic of Yugoslavia) Marijan Beneš; Yugoslavia	Anatoliy Kamnyev; Soviet Union	Ulrich Beyer; East Germany László Juhász; Hungary
Welterweight (– 67 kilograms)	Sándor Csjef; Hungary	Manfred Weidner; East Germany	(Socialist Federal Republic of Yugoslavia) Živorad Jelesijević; Yugoslavia Vladimir Kolev; Bulgaria
Light Middleweight (– 71 kilograms)	Anatoliy Klimanov; Soviet Union	Wiesław Rudkowski; Poland	Peter Tiepold; East Germany Sandu Tirila; Romania
Middleweight (– 75 kilograms)	Vyacheslav Lemeshev; Soviet Union	Alec Năstac; Romania	Witold Stachurski; Poland Pierre Gomez; France
Light Heavyweight (– 81 kilograms)	(Socialist Federal Republic of Yugoslavia) Mate Parlov; Yugoslavia	Janusz Gortat; Poland	Oleg Korotaev; Soviet Union Sjeg Verstappen; Netherlands
Heavyweight (+ 81 kilograms)	Viktor Ulyanich; Soviet Union	Peter Hussing; West Germany	Ion Alexe; Romania Atanas Suvandshijev; Bulgaria

== Medal table ==
* Host nation (Yugoslavia)

Rank	Nation	Gold	Silver	Bronze	Total
1	Soviet Union (URS)	4	1	2	7
2	Romania (ROU)	2	2	3	7
3	Yugoslavia (YUG)*	2	1	1	4
4	East Germany (GDR)	1	1	3	5
5	France (FRA)	1	0	1	2
5	Hungary (HUN)	1	0	1	2
7	Poland (POL)	0	3	2	5
8	Bulgaria (BUL)	0	1	3	4
9	West Germany (FRG)	0	1	2	3
10	Spain (ESP)	0	1	1	2
11	Finland (FIN)	0	0	1	1
11	Netherlands (NED)	0	0	1	1
11	Scotland (SCO)	0	0	1	1
Totals (13 entries)		11	11	22	44
