= Viktor Demyanenko =

Kazakhstani boxer

Medal record

Men's Boxing

Representing the Soviet Union

Olympic Games
Silver medal – second place	1980 Moscow	Lightweight

European Amateur Championships
Gold medal – first place	1979 Cologne	Lightweight
Bronze medal – third place	1983 Varna	Lightweight

Viktor Leonidovich Demyanenko (Russian: Виктор Леонидович Демьяненко) (born August 26, 1958 in Alma-Ata, Kazakh SSR) is a retired boxer, who represented the USSR at the 1980 Summer Olympics in Moscow, Soviet Union. There he won the silver medal in the lightweight division (– 60 kg), after being defeated in the final by Cuba's Ángel Herrera. Demyanenko trained at Dynamo in Alma-Ata. He won gold at the 1979 European Championship. During his career Demyanenko won 267 fights out of 290.

== 1980 Olympic results ==
Below is the record of Viktor Demyanenko, a lightweight boxer from the Soviet Union who competed at the 1980 Moscow Olympics:

- Round of 32: Defeated Mohamed Bangura (Sierra Leone) by disqualification in second round
- Round of 16: Defeated Jong Jo-Ung (North Korea) by decision, 5-0
- Quarterfinal: Defeated Yordan Lessov (Bulgaria) by decision, 5-0
- Semifinal: Defeated Richard Nowakowski (East Germany) referee stopped contest in first round
- Final: Lost to Ángel Herrera (Cuba) referee stopped contest in third round due to injury (was awarded silver medal)
