= Carlos Betancourt (boxer) =

Puerto Rican boxer

Personal information
- Nationality: Puerto Rican
- Born: 4 June 1959 (age 65)

Sport
- Sport: Boxing

Carlos Betancourt (born 4 June 1959) is a Puerto Rican boxer. He competed in the men's middleweight event at the 1976 Summer Olympics. He lost in his opening fight to Dragomir Vujkovic of Yugoslavia.
