= Rumen Peshev =

Bulgarian boxer

Personal information
- Nationality: Bulgarian
- Born: 13 August 1954 (age 70)

Sport
- Sport: Boxing

Rumen Peshev (born 13 August 1954) is a Bulgarian boxer. He competed in the men's featherweight event at the 1976 Summer Olympics. At the 1976 Summer Olympics, he lost to Gustavo de la Cruz of the Dominican Republic in his first fight.
