= Oleg Korotaev =

Soviet-Russian boxer (1949–1994)

Personal information
- Nationality: Soviet Union; Russia
- Born: 4 September 1949 (age 77) Sverdlovsk, Russian SFSR, Soviet Union
- Died: 12 January 1994 (aged 44) New York, U.S.

Boxing career
Medal record
Men's amateur boxing
Representing Soviet Union
European Championships
| Bronze medal – third place | 1973 Belgrade | Light heavyweight |
World Championships
| Silver medal – second place | 1974 Havana | Light heavyweight |

Oleg Korotaev (4 September 1949 – 12 January 1994) was a Soviet-Russian boxer.

== Life and career ==
Korotaev was born in Sverdlovsk. He was a boxing instructor. (Note: Korotaev was a boxing instructor at age 25 in 1975)

Korotaev competed at the 1973 European Amateur Boxing Championships, winning the bronze medal in the light heavyweight event. He also competed at the 1974 World Amateur Boxing Championships, winning the silver medal in the same event.

Later, Korotaev was involved in criminal activities and had two convictions. In 1992, he emigrated to the USA.

Korotaev was murdered on 12 January 1994 in New York, at the age of 44.
