= Gustavo de la Cruz =

Dominican boxer (born 1954)

Personal information
- Nationality: Dominican
- Born: 20 February 1954 (age 71); Dominican Republic
- Height: 170 cm (5 ft 7 in)
- Weight: 57 kg (126 lb)

Sport
- Country: Dominican Republic
- Sport: Boxing

Gustavo de la Cruz (born 20 February 1954) is a Dominican Olympic boxer. He represented his country in the featherweight division at the 1976 Summer Olympics. He won his first bout against Rumen Peshev. He lost his second match against Bratislav Ristić.

== 1976 Olympic results ==
Below are the results of Gustavo de la Cruz, a featherweight boxer from the Dominican Republic who competed at the 1976 Montreal Olympics:

- Round of 64: bye
- Round of 32: defeated Rumen Peshov (Bulgaria) by decision, 5-0
- Round of 16: lost to Bratislav Ristic (Yugoslavia) by decision, 1-4
