= Ruben Mares =

Filipino boxer

Personal information
- Nationality: Filipino
- Born: May 19, 1956 (age 69)

Boxing career
- Weight class: Featherweight

Ruben Mares (born May 19, 1956) is a Filipino boxer. He competed in the men's featherweight event at the 1976 Summer Olympics. At the 1976 Summer Olympics, he lost to Richard Nowakowski of East Germany.
