= Tibor Badari =

Hungarian boxer (1948–2014)

Personal information
- Nationality: Hungarian
- Born: 17 August 1948 Mátészalka, Hungary
- Died: 2014 (aged 65–66)

Sport
- Sport: Boxing
Medal record
Men's amateur boxing
Representing Hungary
European Championships
Gold medal – first place	1971 Madrid	Bantamweight
Gold medal – first place	1975 Katowice	Featherweight

Tibor Badari (17 August 1948 – 9 October 2014) was a Hungarian boxer. He competed at the 1968 Summer Olympics and the 1976 Summer Olympics. At the 1976 Summer Olympics, he defeated Gizaw Asefa of Ethiopia, via a walkover, before losing to Davey Armstrong of the United States.
