= Charlie Magri =

Tunisian-British boxer

Personal information
- Nickname: Champagne Charlie
- Nationality: British Tunisian
- Born: Carmel Magri; 20 July 1956 (age 70) Tunis, Kingdom of Tunisia
- Height: 5 ft 3 in (160 cm)
- Weight: Flyweight

Boxing career
- Reach: 64 in (163 cm)
- Stance: Orthodox

Boxing record
- Total fights: 35
- Wins: 30
- Win by KO: 23
- Losses: 5

Carmel Magri (born 20 July 1956), who boxed under the name Charlie Magri, is a British former professional boxer. He is from a Tunisian family that settled in Limehouse, London, where he grew up. During his professional career he held the WBC and lineal flyweight titles.

== Early life ==
Born Carmel Magri in Tunis, Tunisia in 1956 to Andre and Rose Magri, both of whom were born in Tunisia and had some French-Maltese heritage via their grandparents, Magri moved with his parents and six siblings to England in 1958, and Magri was raised (after moving house a couple of times) on the Burdett Estate in East London. Charlie Magri went to St Philip Howard RC Secondary School in Upper North Street in Poplar. It has been demolished and is now a housing development.

== Amateur career ==
After playing for the Millwall F.C. youth team, which was captained by Jimmy Batten, who was already boxing regularly, Magri decided to take up boxing. As an amateur he boxed for Arbour Youth Boxing Club in Stepney Green and was trained by Jimmy Graham, who arranged for the name on Magri's ABA registration to be changed to Charlie when he was 11.

Charles first ever amateur bout was against Chris Genkins of the Orpington Boxing Club.

He gained the following ABA titles:

- ABA Youth Champion (Class A) - 1972
- ABA Youth Champion (Class B) - 1973
- ABA Light-flyweight Champion (48 kg) - 1974
- ABA Flyweight Champion (51 kg) - 1975
- ABA Flyweight Champion (51 kg) - 1976
- ABA Flyweight Champion (51 kg) - 1977

He also won a bronze medal at the 1975 European championships, and boxed for Great Britain in the 1976 Summer Olympics losing in the third round to Ian Clyde of Canada.

== 1976 Olympic results ==
Below are the results of Charlie Magri, a flyweight boxer, who competed for Great Britain at the 1976 Montreal Olympics:

- Round of 64: bye
- Round of 32: was awarded a victory by walkover versus Eric Quaotsey (Ghana)
- Round of 16: lost to Ian Clyde (Canada) by third-round knockout

== Professional career ==
Magri was 5 ft 3 in tall and had an exciting, aggressive style, being a two-handed puncher who did not care much for defence. He was managed by Terry Lawless.

While working as a tailor's cutter by day, he had his first professional fight in October 1977, at the age of twenty-one; He knocked out Neil Mclaughlin in the second round at the Royal Albert Hall.

In only his third fight he gained the vacant British flyweight title after his fight with Dave Smith was stopped in the seventh round, equalling Dick Smith's 63-year old record for becoming British champion in the fewest fights. In December 1977 he was voted Best Young Boxer by the Boxing Writers' Club.

In his twelfth fight, in May 1979, having won the previous eleven, he won on points against Franco Udella to take the European flyweight title. He won on points over twelve rounds at Wembley Arena.

In December 1979, he defended his European title against Manuel Carrasco, of Spain, winning on points. In June 1980, he defended it again, this time against Giovanni Camputaro of Italy, winning on a technical knockout in the third.

In February 1981, he defended his European title against Spaniard, Enrique Rodríguez, knocking him out in the second round. In September he fought a re-match with Rodríguez in Avilés, Spain, and again knocked him out in the second.

=== World title ===
In March 1983, he fought Eleoncio Mercedes, of the Dominican Republic, for the WBC and lineal flyweight titles. The fight was at Wembley Arena and Magri won the titles when the fight was stopped in the seventh on cuts.

In September 1983, he defended his world titles against Frank Cedeno, of the Philippines. The fight was at Wembley Arena, and Magri lost his titles when the referee stopped the fight in the sixth, after Magri had been knocked down three times.

=== Later fights ===
In his next fight, in August 1984, Magri fought for the vacant European flyweight title that he had previously relinquished. He fought Italian Franco Cherchi in Cagliari, Italy. Magri won in the first round when a clash of heads left the Italian so badly cut that the referee had to stop the fight.

In his next fight, in February 1985, he fought for the WBC flyweight title again. Since Magri had lost it, it had changed hands several times and was now held by Sot Chitalada of Thailand. The fight was held at the Alexandra Palace, London and Chitalada won on a technical knockout at the start of the fifth, after Magri's corner retired him due to cuts.

In October 1985, Magri fought a re-match against Franco Cherchi, in Alessandria, Italy, winning by a knockout in the second round.

In May 1986, Magri had his last fight, defending his European title against Duke McKenzie of Croydon. Magri had relinquished his British flyweight title in August 1981, and McKenzie was now the holder. The fight was stopped in the fifth round when Magri was knocked down and his manager, Lawless, threw in the towel when Magri beat the count.

== Professional boxing record ==
35 fights	30 wins	5 losses
By knockout	23	5
By decision	7	0

No.	Result	Record	Opponent	Type	Round, time	Date	Location	Notes
35	Loss	30–5	Duke McKenzie	RTD	5 (12)	1986-05-20	Wembley Arena, Wembley, England, U.K.	Lost European flyweight title
34	Win	30–4	Franco Cherchi	KO	2 (12)	1985-10-30	Palazzetto dello Sport, Alessandria, Italy	Retained European flyweight title
33	Loss	29–4	Sot Chitalada	RTD	4 (12)	1985-02-20	Alexandra Palace, Wood Green, England, U.K.	For WBC and The Ring flyweight titles
32	Win	29–3	Franco Cherchi	TKO	1 (12)	1984-08-24	Cagliari, Italy	Won vacant European flyweight title
31	Loss	28–3	Frank Cedeno	TKO	6 (12)	1983-09-27	Wembley Arena, Wembley, England, U.K.	Lost WBC and The Ring flyweight titles
30	Win	28–2	Eleoncio Mercedes	TKO	7 (12)	1983-03-15	Wembley Arena, Wembley, England, U.K.	Won WBC and The Ring flyweight titles
29	Win	27–2	Jose Torres	PTS	10 (10)	1982-11-23	Wembley Arena, Wembley, England, U.K.	
28	Win	26–2	Enrique Rodríguez	TKO	2 (12)	1982-09-18	Pabellón Deportivo de La Magdalena, Aviles, Spain	Retained European flyweight title
27	Loss	25–2	Jose Torres	TKO	9 (10)	1982-05-04	Wembley Arena, Wembley, England, U.K.	
26	Win	25–1	Ron Cisneros	TKO	3 (10)	1982-04-20	Royal Albert Hall, Kensington, England, U.K.	
25	Win	24–1	Cipriano Arreola	PTS	10 (10)	1982-03-02	Royal Albert Hall, Kensington, England, U.K.	
24	Loss	23–1	Juan Diaz	KO	6 (10)	1981-10-13	Royal Albert Hall, Kensington, England, U.K.	
23	Win	23–0	Jose Herrera	KO	1 (10)	1981-06-20	Empire Pool, Wembley, England, U.K.	
22	Win	22–0	Enrique Rodríguez	TKO	2 (12)	1981-02-24	Royal Albert Hall, Kensington, England, U.K.	Retained European flyweight title
21	Win	21–0	Santos Laciar	PTS	10 (10)	1980-12-08	Royal Albert Hall, Kensington, England, U.K.	
20	Win	20–0	Enrique Castro	TKO	1 (10)	1980-10-14	Royal Albert Hall, Kensington, England, U.K.	
19	Win	19–0	Alfonso López	PTS	10 (10)	1980-09-16	Conference Centre, Wembley, England, U.K.	
18	Win	18–0	Giovanni Camputaro	TKO	3 (12)	1980-06-28	Empire Pool, Wembley, England, U.K.	Retained European flyweight title
17	Win	17–0	Aniceto Vargas	KO	3 (10)	1980-01-22	Royal Albert Hall, Kensington, England, U.K.	
16	Win	16–0	Manuel Carrasco	UD	12 (12)	1979-12-04	Empire Pool, Wembley, England, U.K.	Retained European flyweight title
15	Win	15–0	Candy Iglesias	TKO	3 (10)	1979-10-23	Conference Centre, Wembley, England, U.K.	
14	Win	14–0	Raul Pacheco	TKO	6 (10)	1979-09-25	Empire Pool, Wembley, England, U.K.	
13	Win	13–0	Freddie Gonzalez	KO	3 (10)	1979-05-29	Royal Albert Hall, Kensington, England, U.K.	
12	Win	12–0	Franco Udella	SD	12 (12)	1979-05-01	Empire Pool, Wembley, England, U.K.	Won European flyweight title
11	Win	11–0	Mike Stuart	KO	3 (10)	1979-02-20	Royal Albert Hall, Kensington, England, U.K.	
10	Win	10–0	Filippo Belvedere	TKO	1 (8)	1979-01-23	Royal Albert Hall, Kensington, England, U.K.	
9	Win	9–0	Mariano Garcia	KO	3 (8)	1978-12-05	Royal Albert Hall, Kensington, England, U.K.	
8	Win	8–0	Claudio Tanda	TKO	1 (8)	1978-10-24	Royal Albert Hall, Kensington, England, U.K.	
7	Win	7–0	Sabatino De Filippo	TKO	7 (8)	1978-09-12	Conference Centre, Wembley, England, U.K.	
6	Win	6–0	Manuel Carrasco	PTS	8 (8)	1978-04-25	Royal Albert Hall, Kensington, England, U.K.	
5	Win	5–0	Dominique Cesari	RTD	3 (8)	1978-04-04	Royal Albert Hall, Kensington, England, U.K.	
4	Win	4–0	Nessim Zebelini	TKO	3 (8)	1978-02-21	Royal Albert Hall, Kensington, England, U.K.	
3	Win	3–0	Dave Smith	TKO	7 (15)	1977-12-06	Royal Albert Hall, Kensington, England, U.K.	Won vacant British flyweight title
2	Win	2–0	Bryn Griffiths	TKO	2 (8)	1977-11-15	York Hall, Bethnal Green, England, U.K.	
1	Win	1–0	Neil McLaughlin	KO	2 (8)	1977-10-25	Royal Albert Hall, Kensington, England, U.K.	

== After boxing ==
Magri was the manager for super-featherweight boxer, Dean Pithie. Magri owned a sports shop on the Bethnal Green Road and later owned the Victoria pub in Bow, east London.

In 2017 he became a coach at Ealing, Hammersmith and West London College's boxing academy.

== See also ==
- List of world flyweight boxing champions
- List of British world boxing champions

== Sources ==
- Magri, Charlie (2007) Champagne Charlie, Pennant Books, ISBN 978-1906015091

Sporting positions
Amateur boxing titles
Previous: Michael Abrams	ABA Light-Flyweight champion 1974	Next: Michael Lawless
Previous: Maurice O'Sullivan	ABA Flyweight champion 1975 – 1977	Next: Gary Nickels
Regional boxing titles
Vacant Title last held by John McCluskey	British flyweight champion 6 December 1977 – 1977; Vacated	Vacant Title next held by Kelvin Smart
Preceded by Franco Udella	EBU flyweight champion 1 May 1979 – 1982; Vacated	Vacant Title next held by Antoine Montero
Vacant Title last held by Antoine Montero	EBU flyweight champion 24 August 1984 – 1984; Vacated	Vacant Title next held by Franco Cherchi
Preceded by Franco Cherchi	EBU flyweight champion 30 October 1985 – 20 May 1986	Succeeded by Duke McKenzie
World boxing titles
Preceded by Eleoncio Mercedes	WBC flyweight champion 15 March 1983 – 27 September 1983	Succeeded by Frank Cedeno
Preceded by Eleoncio Mercedes	The Ring flyweight champion 15 March 1983 – 27 September 1983	Succeeded by Frank Cedeno
