= Joachim Schür =

German boxer

Personal information
- Nationality: German
- Born: 13 October 1957 (age 67); Herne, West Germany

Sport
- Sport: Boxing

Joachim Schür (born 13 October 1957) is a German boxer. He competed in the men's flyweight event at the 1976 Summer Olympics.
