= Camille Huard =

Canadian boxer

Camille Huard (born October 29, 1951, in Saint-François-de-Pabos, Quebec) is a retired boxer from Canada, who represented his native country at the 1976 Summer Olympics in the featherweight division. There he was defeated in the Round of 16 by Poland's eventual bronze medalist Leszek Kosedowski.

== 1976 Olympic results ==
Below are the results of Camille Huard, a Canadian featherweight boxer who competed at the 1976 Montreal Olympics:

- Round of 64: bye
- Round of 32: defeated Bachir Koual (Algeria) by walkover
- Round of 16: lost to Leszek Kosedowski (Poland) by decision, 0-5
