= Sandalio Calderon =

Colombian male boxer

Personal information
- Nationality: Colombian
- Born: 19 October 1952 (age 72)

Sport
- Sport: Boxing

Sandalio Calderon (born 19 October 1952) is a Colombian boxer. He competed in the men's featherweight event at the 1976 Summer Olympics. He lost in the opening round of the competition to Angel Pacheco of Venezuela.
