= Vicente Rodríguez (boxer) =

Spanish boxer

Personal information
- Full name: Vicente Rodríguez Royán
- Nationality: Spanish
- Born: 20 July 1954 (age 71) Guareña, Spain

Sport
- Sport: Boxing
Medal record
Men's boxing
Representing Spain
European Amateur Boxing Championships
| Silver medal – second place | 1973 Belgrade | Flyweight |

Vicente Rodríguez Royán (born 20 July 1954) is a retired boxer from Spain, who represented his native country at the 1976 Summer Olympics. There he was stopped (lost on points, 2:3) in the third round of the flyweight division (– 51 kg) division by North Korea's Jong Jo-Ung.
