= Serge Thomas =

French boxer

Personal information
- Nationality: French
- Born: 24 June 1951 (age 73)

Sport
- Sport: Boxing

Serge Thomas (born 24 June 1951) is a French boxer. He competed in the men's featherweight event at the 1976 Summer Olympics. He lost in round 32 to Rene Weller of West Germany.
