= Jorma Taipale =

Finnish boxer

Personal information
- Nationality: Finnish
- Born: 15 May 1949 (age 75); Helsinki, Finland

Sport
- Sport: Boxing

Jorma Taipale (born 15 May 1949) is a Finnish boxer. He competed in the men's middleweight event at the 1976 Summer Olympics. At the 1976 Summer Olympics, he lost to Rufat Riskiyev of the Soviet Union.
