= Viktor Ulyanich =

Russian boxer (1949–2014)

Personal information
- Full name: Виктор Петрович Ульянич
- Nationality: Russia
- Born: February 26, 1949 Soviet Union
- Died: November 27, 2014 (aged 65) Moscow, Russia

Sport
- Sport: Boxing
- Weight class: Heavyweight
- Club: CSKA Moskva, Moskva
Medal record
European Amateur Championships
Gold medal – first place	1973 Belgrade	Heavyweight
Silver medal – second place	1975 Katowice	Heavyweight

Viktor Ulyanich (February 26, 1949 – November 27, 2014) was a Soviet boxer who was European champion in 1973, finalist of the European Championship in 1975, championship finalist of the USSR in 1979 and winner of the USSR championships (1974, 1975) in the weight category over 81 kg, He was a Honored Master of Sports of Russia and USSR, head coach of the Russian Armed Forces, among his students were champions of the country and Europe, Honored Master of Sports Viktor Rybakov, Ulyanich, Eduard Dubovskii, Aleksandr Lukach and others.

Ulyanich died on November 27, 2014.
