= Kōji Kobayashi (boxer) =

Japanese boxer (born 1957)

Kōji Kobayashi 小林 光二
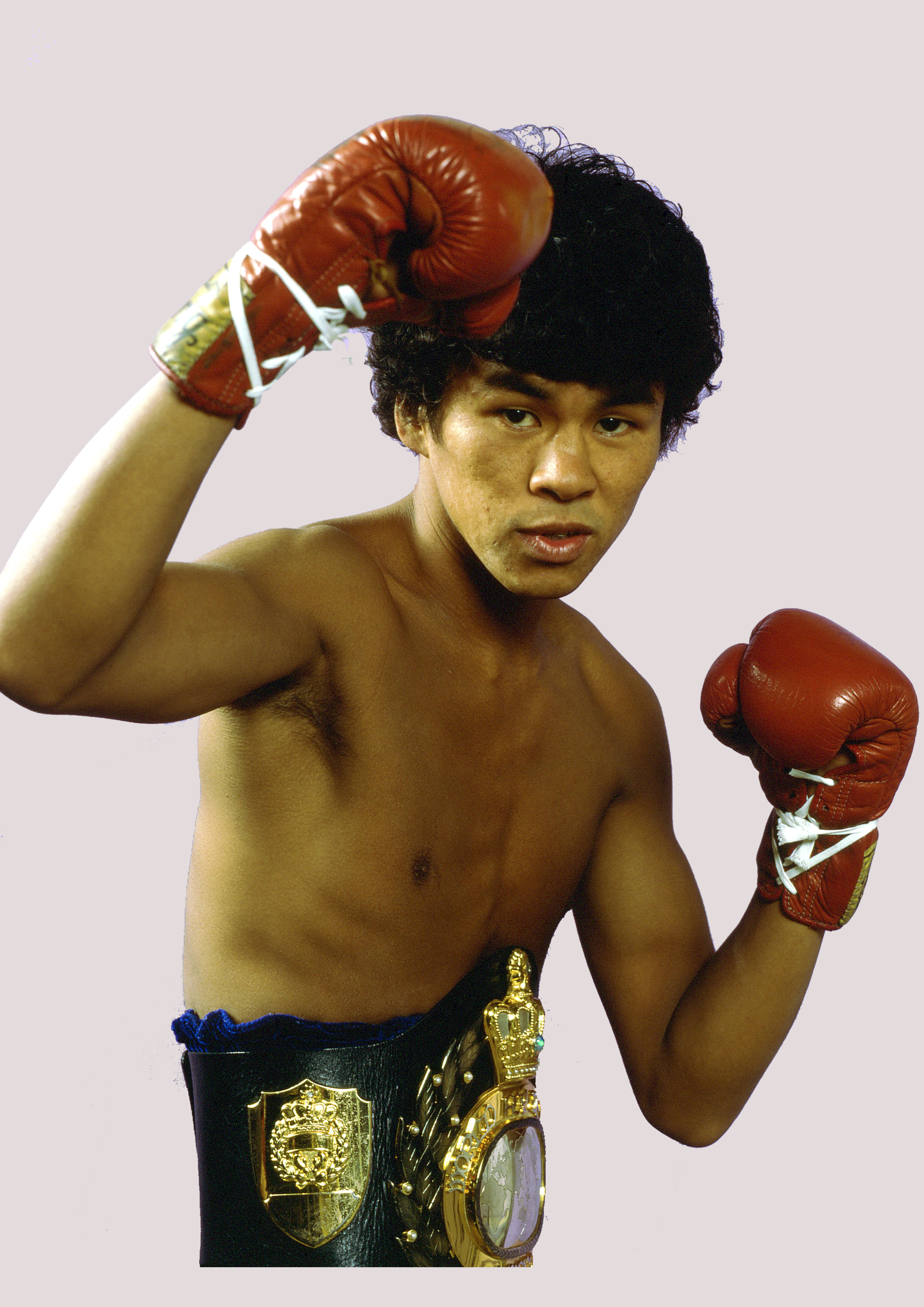

Personal information
- Nationality: Japanese
- Born: 27 August 1957 (age 68) Katsushika, Tokyo, Japan
- Height: 5 ft 7 in (170 cm)
- Weight: Flyweight

Boxing career
- Stance: Southpaw

Boxing record
- Total fights: 31
- Wins: 24
- Win by KO: 15
- Losses: 4
- Draws: 3

Kōji Kobayashi (小林 光二, Kobayashi Kōji; born August 27, 1957) is a retired Japanese professional boxer who is a former WBC and lineal flyweight champion.

== Early life ==
Kobayashi was poor at sports in his childhood. He was a slow runner, and lacked in arm strength. He began boxing at Tanabe Boxing Gym while studying design at Tokyo Designer Gakuin College after graduating from high school, and transferred to Kadoebi Houseki Boxing Gym after a year.

== Professional career ==
Kobayashi made his professional debut with a third round knockout victory in December 1978. He won the annual Japanese boxing series, East Japan Rookie King Tournament in the flyweight division by knocking out the future Japanese featherweight champion Hiroyuki Kobayashi at the Korakuen Hall in December 1979. However, he was knocked out by Jirō Watanabe in the first round of the final match of All-Japan Rookie King Tournament at the Osaka Prefectural Gymnasium in February 1980. He then had a fifteen-fight winning streak including ten knockouts over the former world ranked boxer Facomron Vibonchai, the national champions of Thailand, Philippines, Korea and others.

On January 18, 1984, Kobayashi fought against Frank Cedeño for the WBC and lineal flyweight titles at the Korakuen Hall. For that fight, Isamu Mitsuhira, the former trainer of Kyokutō Boxing Club to which Yoshiaki Numata belonged, served as his special coach. Kobayashi, who appeared in the ring while listening to the music with the Walkman, knocked out Cedeño flooring him four times with his left crosses and left hook in the second round to be crowned the new champion.

In his first defense in April 1984, he was knocked out by the mandatory challenger Gabriel Bernal in the second round at the Korakuen Hall. Kobayashi moved up in weight division and was poised to be a two division champion, but lost to Kazuo Katsuma via a twelfth round stoppage in the WBC junior bantamweight title eliminator in March 1985. He retired after a two-fight losing streak.

== Professional boxing record ==
31 fights	24 wins	4 losses
By knockout	15	4
By decision	9	0
Draws	3	

No.	Result	Record	Opponent	Type	Round, time	Date	Location	Notes
31	Loss	24–4–3	Yoshiyuki Uchida	TKO	7 (10)	1985-08-27	Korakuen Hall, Tokyo, Japan	
30	Loss	24–3–3	Kazuo Katsuma	TKO	12 (12)	1985-03-05	Korakuen Hall, Tokyo, Japan	
29	Win	24–2–3	Joe Shiranui	UD	10 (10)	1984-12-01	City Gymnasium, Tsuruga, Japan	
28	Win	23–2–3	Kap Dong Park	UD	10 (10)	1984-10-16	Korakuen Hall, Tokyo, Japan	
27	Win	22–2–3	Allan Makitoki	MD	10 (10)	1984-06-19	Korakuen Hall, Tokyo, Japan	
26	Loss	21–2–3	Gabriel Bernal	KO	2 (12)	1984-04-09	Korakuen Hall, Tokyo, Japan	Lost WBC and The Ring flyweight titles
25	Win	21–1–3	Frank Cedeno	TKO	2 (12)	1984-01-18	Korakuen Hall, Tokyo, Japan	Won WBC and The Ring flyweight titles
24	Win	20–1–3	Rord Mitsuru	TKO	7 (10)	1983-07-07	Kinki University Auditorium, Osaka, Japan	
23	Win	19–1–3	Chan Soo Jung	TKO	5 (10)	1983-04-19	Korakuen Hall, Tokyo, Japan	
22	Win	18–1–3	Rodrigo Saonoy	UD	10 (10)	1982-11-05	Korakuen Hall, Tokyo, Japan	
21	Draw	17–1–3	Jackal Maruyama	UD	10 (10)	1982-09-03	Korakuen Hall, Tokyo, Japan	
20	Win	17–1–2	Jong Chul Park	RTD	5 (10)	1982-06-04	Korakuen Hall, Tokyo, Japan	
19	Win	16–1–2	Flash Jagdon	UD	10 (10)	1982-03-06	Korakuen Hall, Tokyo, Japan	
18	Win	15–1–2	Phaktai Lipovitan	KO	4 (10)	1981-11-21	Korakuen Hall, Tokyo, Japan	
17	Win	14–1–2	Jiro Takada	TKO	7 (10)	1981-08-04	Korakuen Hall, Tokyo, Japan	
16	Win	13–1–2	Facomron Vibonchai	KO	2 (10)	1981-05-10	Korakuen Hall, Tokyo, Japan	
15	Win	12–1–2	Nobuo Horigome	KO	4 (10)	1981-04-07	Korakuen Hall, Tokyo, Japan	
14	Win	11–1–2	Fujimi Wada	KO	2 (8)	1981-02-03	Korakuen Hall, Tokyo, Japan	
13	Win	10–1–2	Hirohisa Iino	KO	6 (10)	1980-12-16	Korakuen Hall, Tokyo, Japan	
12	Win	9–1–2	Nobuo Horigome	PTS	8 (8)	1980-11-08	Korakuen Hall, Tokyo, Japan	
11	Win	8–1–2	Kazuyoshi Funaki	KO	1 (8)	1980-08-29	Korakuen Hall, Tokyo, Japan	
10	Win	7–1–2	Yoshiaki Kanda	PTS	6 (6)	1980-04-14	Korakuen Hall, Tokyo, Japan	
9	Loss	6–1–2	Jiro Watanabe	KO	1 (6)	1980-02-21	Prefectural Gymnasium, Osaka, Japan	
8	Win	6–0–2	Hiroyuki Kobayashi	KO	2 (6)	1979-12-23	Korakuen Hall, Tokyo, Japan	
7	Win	5–0–2	Mutsuo Watanabe	PTS	4 (4)	1979-09-21	Korakuen Hall, Tokyo, Japan	
6	Win	4–0–2	Koichi Togashi	KO	3 (4)	1979-07-20	Korakuen Hall, Tokyo, Japan	
5	Win	3–0–2	Shinji Takagi	KO	2 (4)	1979-05-07	Korakuen Hall, Tokyo, Japan	
4	Win	2–0–2	Junichi Ota	PTS	4 (4)	1979-03-23	Korakuen Hall, Tokyo, Japan	
3	Draw	1–0–2	Kiyomi Sato	PTS	4 (4)	1979-02-23	Korakuen Hall, Tokyo, Japan	
2	Draw	1–0–1	Mutsuo Watanabe	PTS	4 (4)	1979-01-04	Korakuen Hall, Tokyo, Japan	
1	Win	1–0	Ryutaro Abe	KO	3 (4)	1978-12-12	Korakuen Hall, Tokyo, Japan	

== Post-retirement ==
Currently Kobayashi teaches sports as a civil servant in Katsushika.

== See also ==
- List of southpaw stance boxers
- Lineal championship
- Boxing in Japan
- List of Japanese boxing world champions
- List of world flyweight boxing champions

== Bibliography ==
- Boxing Magazine editorial department, ed. (May 31, 2002). 日本プロボクシング史 世界タイトルマッチで見る50年 (Japan Pro Boxing History – 50 Years of World Title Bouts) (in Japanese). Tokyo, Japan: Baseball Magazine Sha Co., Ltd. pp. 103–104, 295. ISBN 978-4-583-03695-3.

Sporting positions
World boxing titles
Preceded by Frank Cedeno	WBC flyweight champion January 18, 1984 – April 9, 1984	Succeeded by Gabriel Bernal
Preceded by Frank Cedeno	The Ring flyweight champion January 18, 1984 – April 9, 1984	Succeeded by Gabriel Bernal
