= Davidson Andeh =

Nigerian boxer

Personal information
- Born: January 17, 1958 (age 68)
Medal record
Men's Boxing
Representing Nigeria
World Amateur Championships
Gold medal – first place	1978 Belgrade	Lightweight

Davidson Andeh (born January 17, 1958) is a retired boxer from Nigeria, who won the world title in the lightweight division (– 60 kg) at the second World Amateur Championships, held in Belgrade, Yugoslavia. In the final he defeated Vladimir Sorokin from the USSR.

Andeh represented his native country at the 1976 Summer Olympics in Montreal, Quebec, Canada, but Nigeria withdrew from the competition due to the participation of New Zealand, and so the win in the first round of the featherweight division (– 57 kg) was given to India's Rai Sik.

Andeh became professional in 1980, and captured the African lightweight title in 1983 by defeating Tapsoga Tiga of Togo. He retired from competition in 1987, with a record of 18 wins (12 knockouts), five losses and one no-contest.
