= Marvin Stinson =

American boxer

Personal information
- Nationality: United States
- Born: North Philadelphia, U.S.
- Height: 6’ 3”
- Weight: Heavyweight

Boxing career
- Weight class: Heavyweight
- Stance: Orthodox

Boxing record
- Total fights: 18
- Wins: 12
- Win by KO: 6
- Losses: 3
- Draws: 3
Medal record
Men's amateur boxing
Representing United States
World Championships
Silver medal – second place	1974 Havana	Heavyweight

Marvin Stinson is an American boxer.

== Life and career ==
Stinson was born in North Philadelphia. He began boxing at the Police Athletic League.

Stinson competed at the 1974 World Amateur Boxing Championships, winning the silver medal in the heavyweight event. He also won four Golden Gloves titles in Philadelphia, Pennsylvania.
