= Norman Stevens (boxer) =

Australian boxer

Personal information
- Nationality: Australian
- Born: 6 October 1958 (age 67) Innisfail, Queensland

Boxing career

Norman 'Norm' Stevens (born 6 October 1958) is an Indigenous Australian boxer who lost to Geza Tumbas of Yugoslavia by decision, 1–4, at the 1980 Moscow Olympics, in the lightweight division.
