= Leszek Kosedowski =

Polish boxer (born 1954)

Olympic medal record

Representing Poland

Men's boxing
Bronze medal – third place	1976 Montreal	Featherweight

Leszek Marian Kosedowski (born May 25, 1954 in Środa Śląska) is a retired boxer from Poland, who won a bronze medal in the men's featherweight division (– 57 kg) at the 1976 Summer Olympics in Montreal, Quebec, Canada. There he was defeated in the semifinals by the eventual silver medalist, Richard Nowakowski of East Germany.

His younger brothers, Krzysztof Kosedowski and Dariusz Kosedowski, were also boxers who competed in the Olympics for Poland.

== 1976 Olympic results ==
Below are the results of Leszek Kosedowski, a Polish featherweight boxer who competed at the 1976 Montreal Olympics:

- Round of 64: bye
- Round of 32: Defeated Cornelius Boza-Edwards (Uganda) by walkover; country boycotted
- Round of 16: Defeated Camille Huard (Canada) by decision, 5-0
- Quarterfinal: Defeated Bratislav Ristić (Yugoslavia) by decision, 5-0
- Semifinal: Lost to Richard Nowakowski (East Germany) by decision, 0-5
