= Antônio Toledo Filho =

Brazilian boxer

Personal information
- Born: 5 October 1953 (age 71); São Paulo, Brazil

Sport
- Sport: Boxing

Antônio Toledo Filho (born 5 October 1953) is a Brazilian boxer. He competed in the men's flyweight event at the 1976 Summer Olympics.
