= Ian Clyde =

Canadian boxer (born 1956)

Personal information
- Born: May 15, 1956 (age 70) Verdun, Quebec, Canada
Medal record
Men's Boxing
Representing Canada
Commonwealth Games
Silver medal – second place	1978 Edmonton	Flyweight
Pan American Games
Bronze medal – third place	1979 San Juan	Flyweight

Ian Clyde (born May 15, 1956 in Verdun, Quebec) is a retired boxer from Canada, who represented his native country at the 1976 Summer Olympics. After defeating Charlie Magri of Great Britain, he was defeated in the quarterfinals of the men's flyweight division (– 51 kilograms) by Cuba's eventual silver medalist Ramón Duvalón. Clyde won a silver medal at the 1978 Commonwealth Games and a bronze medal at the 1979 Pan American Games. He also competed at the 1975 Pan American Games. Ian Clyde has followed his career as a professional athlete to offer personal fitness boxing coaching and competitive boxing instruction to young athletes in Montreal.

== 1976 Olympic results ==
Below are the results of Ian Clyde, a Canadian flyweight boxer who competed at the 1976 Montreal Olympics:

- Round of 64: bye
- Round of 32: defeated Alick Chiteule (Zambia) by walkover
- Round of 16: defeated Charlie Magri (Great Britain) by a third-round knockout
- Quarterfinal: lost to Ramón Duvalón (Cuba) by decision, 0-5
