= Ernesto Ríos (boxer) =

Mexican boxer (born 1959)

Personal information
- Full name: Ernesto Ríos Jiménez
- Born: 5 May 1959 (age 65); Mexicali, Baja California, Mexico

Sport
- Sport: Boxing

Ernesto Ríos Jiménez (born 5 May 1959) is a Mexican former professional boxer. As an amateur, he competed in the men's flyweight event at the 1976 Summer Olympics. He lost to Venezuela's Alfredo Pérez in his only bout in the Round of 64.

A native of Mexicali, Ríos was a state champion in the 45 kg category by the age of 12. He was soon called up to the Mexico national team, but was unable to compete at the 1975 Pan American Games due to his youth. After the 1976 Olympics, Ríos embarked on a short professional career which culminated in 1979 with a loss to Jaime Garza in Los Angeles. He subsequently retired from the sport in order to provide for his family as a farmworker.
