= Sándor Orbán =

Hungarian boxer

Personal information
- Nationality: Hungarian
- Born: 24 September 1947 Kecskemét, Hungary
- Died: 19 March 2005 (aged 57) Budapest, Hungary

Sport
- Sport: Boxing

Sándor Orbán (24 September 1947 – 19 March 2005) was a Hungarian boxer. He competed in the men's flyweight event at the 1976 Summer Olympics.
