= Sándor Csjef =

Hungarian boxer (1950–2016)

Medal record

Men's boxing

Representing Hungary

European Amateur Championships
Gold medal – first place	1973 Belgrade	Welterweight

Sándor Csjef (22 August 1950 – 20 March 2016) was a Hungarian amateur boxer. He won the gold medal in the welterweight division (– 67 kg) at the 1973 European Amateur Boxing Championships in Belgrade, Yugoslavia.

He died in a train accident near Monorierdő on 20 March 2016 at the age of 65.
