= Raimundo Alves =

Brazilian boxer

Personal information
- Born: 31 August 1950 (age 74); Belém, Brazil

Sport
- Sport: Boxing

Raimundo Alves (born 31 August 1950) is a Brazilian boxer. He competed in the men's featherweight event at the 1976 Summer Olympics. At the 1976 Summer Olympics, he lost to Juan Paredes of Mexico.
