= Bratislav Ristić (boxer) =

Yugoslav boxer (born 1954)

Personal information
- Nationality: Yugoslav
- Born: 1 April 1954 (age 72)
Medal record
Men's amateur boxing
Representing Yugoslavia
World Championships
Silver medal – second place	1978 Belgrade	Featherweight
European Amateur Championships
Silver medal – second place	1975 Katowice	Featherweight
Mediterranean Games
Bronze medal – third place	1979 Split	Featherweight

Bratislav Ristić (born 1 April 1954) is a Yugoslav boxer. He competed in the men's featherweight event at the 1976 Summer Olympics. At the 1976 Summer Olympics, he defeated Mohamed Younes Naguib and Gustavo de la Cruz, before losing to Leszek Kosedowski.
