= Armando Guevara =

Venezuelan boxer

Personal information
- Full name: Ramón Armando Guevara
- Born: January 16, 1955 (age 71)
Medal record
Men's Boxing
Representing Venezuela
World Amateur Championships
Bronze medal – third place	1978 Belgrade	Light Flyweight

Ramón Armando Guevara (born January 16, 1955) is a former boxer from Venezuela, who twice competed at the Summer Olympics: 1976 and 1980. He won the bronze medal at the 1978 World Amateur Boxing Championships in the light flyweight division.

== 1976 Olympic results ==
Below is the record of Armando Guevara, a Venezuelan light flyweight boxer who competed at the 1976 Montreal Olympics:

- Round of 32: defeated Eduardo Baltar (Philippines) by decision, 5-0
- Round of 16: defeated Dietmar Geilich (East Germany) by decision, 5-0
- Quarterfinal: lost to Li Byong-Uk (North Korea) by decision, 2-3

== 1980 Olympic results ==
Below is the record of Armando Guevara, a Venezuelan flyweight boxer who competed at the 1980 Moscow Olympics:

- Round of 32: defeated Nyamyn Narantuyaa (Mongolia) by decision, 5-0
- Round of 16: lost to Yo Ryon-sik (North Korea) by decision, 1-4
