= Alec Năstac =

Romanian boxer (born 1949)

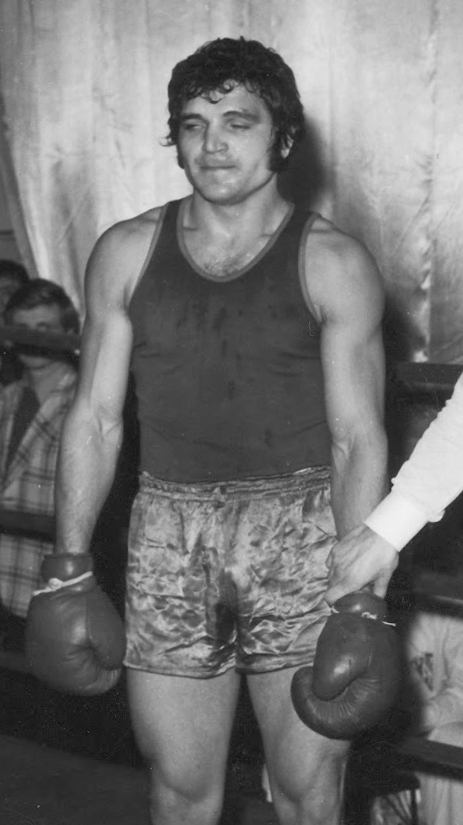
- Năstac in 1974

Personal information
- Full name: Alexandru Năstac
- Born: 2 April 1949 (age 77) Căvădineşti, Galați, Romania
- Height: 177 cm (5 ft 10 in)
- Weight: 75 kg (165 lb)

Sport
- Sport: Boxing
- Club: Constructorul Galați; Steaua București
- Coached by: Grigore Jelesneac; Petre Mihai
Medal record
Representing Romania
Romania National Amateur Boxing Championships
| Silver medal – second place | 1968 Bucharest | -75 kg |
| Gold medal – first place | 1969 Bucharest | -75 kg |
| Silver medal – second place | 1970 Bucharest | -75 kg |
| Gold medal – first place | 1971 Bucharest | -75 kg |
| Gold medal – first place | 1972 Bucharest | -75 kg |
| Gold medal – first place | 1973 Cluj | -75 kg |
| Gold medal – first place | 1975 Bucharest | -75 kg |
| Gold medal – first place | 1976 Bucharest | -75 kg |
| Gold medal – first place | 1977 Bucharest | -75 kg |
Olympic Games
| Bronze medal – third place | 1976 Montreal | -75 kg |
World Amateur Championships
| Silver medal – second place | 1974 Havana | -75 kg |
European Amateur Championships
| Silver medal – second place | 1971 Madrid | -75 kg |
| Silver medal – second place | 1973 Belgrade | -75 kg |

Alexandru "Alec" Năstac (born 2 April 1949) is a retired middleweight boxer from Romania. He competed at the 1972 and 1976 Olympics and won a bronze medal in 1976. He also won silver medals at the 1971 and 1973 European championships and 1974 World Championships.

Năstac took up boxing in 1967 at Constructorul Galați, coached by Grigore Jelesneac and Petre Mihai. While serving with the Romanian Army he moved to Steaua București, where he stayed for the rest of his career, first as competitor and after 1978 as coach. In the 1980s he also played minor roles in a few Romanian films including The Ring.

== 1972 Olympic results ==
Below is the record of Alec Năstac, a Romanian middleweight boxer who competed at the 1972 Munich Olympics:

- Round of 32: lost to Alejandro Montoya (Cuba) by first-round knockout
