= Yukio Odagiri =

Japanese boxer (born 1956)

Personal information
- Nationality: Japanese
- Born: 10 February 1956 (age 69); Hirosaki, Aomori, Japan

Sport
- Sport: Boxing

Yukio Odagiri (小田桐 幸雄, Odagiri Yukio; born 10 February 1956) is a Japanese boxer. He competed in the men's featherweight event at the 1976 Summer Olympics.
