= S. K. Rai =

Indian boxer

Sen Rai
Personal information
- Full name: Sahadeo Kumar Rai
- Nationality: Indian

Sport
- Sport: Boxing

Sen Rai is an Indian boxer. He competed in the men's featherweight event at the 1976 Summer Olympics. He won his first bout by walkover, but lost his subsequent fight to Ángel Herrera Vera of Cuba.
