= Carlo Russolillo =

Italian boxer (1957–2026)

Personal information
- Nationality: Italian
- Born: 17 March 1957 Genoa, Italy
- Died: 24 March 2026 (aged 69)

Sport
- Sport: Boxing

Carlo Russolillo (17 March 1957 – 24 March 2026) was an Italian boxer. He competed in the men's lightweight event at the 1980 Summer Olympics. Russolillo died in March 2026, at the age of 69.
