= José Ollarves =

Venezuelan cyclist

Personal information
- Born: 5 May 1953 (age 73)

Cycling career
- Sport: Cycling

José Ollarves (born 5 May 1953) is a Venezuelan former cyclist. He competed in the individual road race and team time trial events at the 1976 Summer Olympics.
