= Alphonse Matoubela =

Congolese boxer (born 1958)

Alphonse Matoubela (born 15 October 1958) is a boxer from the Republic of Congo, who competed in the lightweight (– 60 kg) division at the 1980 Summer Olympics. Matoubela lost his opening bout to Tibor Dezamits of Hungary by decision, 0-5. He was born in Léopoldville, Belgian Congo.
