= Dave Odwell =

British boxer

Personal information
- Nationality: British
- Born: 20 November 1952 (age 72); Hackney, London, England

Sport
- Sport: Boxing

David J Odwell (born 20 November 1952) is a British boxer. He competed in the men's middleweight event at the 1976 Summer Olympics.

Odwell won the 1974 and 1975 Amateur Boxing Association British middleweight title, when boxing out of the Repton ABC.
