= Galsandorjiin Batbileg =

Mongolian boxer (born 1952)

Personal information
- Nationality: Mongolian
- Born: 29 February 1952 (age 74)
- Height: 171 cm (5 ft 7 in)
- Weight: 60 kg (132 lb)

Boxing career
- Weight class: Lightweight

Galsandorjiin Batbileg (Галсандоржийн Батбилэг, born 29 February 1952) is a Mongolian boxer. He competed in the men's lightweight event at the 1980 Summer Olympics.
