= Toshinori Koga =

Japanese boxer

Personal information
- Nationality: Japanese
- Born: 24 May 1948 (age 76); Fukuoka, Japan

Sport
- Sport: Boxing

Toshinori Koga (古賀 俊憲, Toga Toshinori, born 24 May 1948) is a Japanese boxer. He competed in the men's flyweight event at the 1976 Summer Olympics.
