= Kim Jeong-cheol =

South Korean boxer

Personal information
- Nationality: South Korean
- Born: 20 March 1957 (age 68)

Sport
- Sport: Boxing

Kim Jeong-cheol (born 20 March 1957) is a South Korean boxer. He competed in the men's flyweight event at the 1976 Summer Olympics.
