= Florian Livadaru =

Romanian boxer (born 1955)

Personal information
- Nationality: Romanian
- Born: 18 November 1955 (age 70)

Sport
- Sport: Boxing
Medal record
Men's amateur boxing
Representing Romania
Romania National Amateur Boxing Championships
Gold medal – first place	1975 Bucharest	-60 kg
Silver medal – second place	1976 Bucharest	-60 kg
Silver medal – second place	1980 Bucharest	-60 kg

Florian Livadaru (born 18 November 1955) is a Romanian boxer. He competed in the men's lightweight event at the 1980 Summer Olympics. He won the Romanian National Amateur Boxing Championship at the lightweight division in 1975.
