= Justo Galaviz =

Venezuelan cyclist

Personal information
- Born: 6 September 1954
- Died: 21 September 2013 (aged 59) Caracas, Venezuela

Cycling career
- Sport: Cycling

Justo Galaviz (6 September 1954 – 21 September 2013) was a Venezuelan cyclist. He competed in the individual road race and team time trial events at the 1976 Summer Olympics.
