= Gheorghe Ciochină =

Romanian boxer

Personal information
- Nationality: Romanian
- Born: 13 June 1951 (age 73)

Sport
- Sport: Boxing

Gheorghe Ciochină (born 13 June 1951) is a Romanian boxer. He competed in the men's featherweight event at the 1976 Summer Olympics.
