= Behzad Ghaedi =

Iranian boxer

Personal information
- Nationality: Iranian
- Born: 17 October 1956 (age 68)

Sport
- Sport: Boxing

Behzad Ghaedi (Persian: بهزاد قائدی; born 17 October 1956) is an Iranian boxer. He competed in the men's featherweight event at the 1976 Summer Olympics.
