= Geza Tumbas =

Yugoslav boxer (born 1957)

Personal information
- Nationality: Yugoslav
- Born: 7 June 1957 (age 67)

Sport
- Sport: Boxing

Geza Tumbas (born 7 June 1957) is a Yugoslav boxer who competed in the men's lightweight event at the 1980 Summer Olympics.
