= Giovanni Camputaro =

Italian boxer

Personal information
- Nationality: Italian
- Born: 6 April 1955 (age 69); Gioia Sannitica, Italy

Sport
- Sport: Boxing

Giovanni Camputaro (born 6 April 1955) is an Italian boxer. He competed in the men's flyweight event at the 1976 Summer Olympics.
