= Carlos Calderón (boxer) =

Puerto Rican boxer

- Citizenship: Puerto Rico
- Occupation: Boxer featherweight

Carlos Calderón
Medal record

Representing Puerto Rico

Men's Boxing

Central American Games
Silver medal – second place	1973 Central American Games	featherweight

Florida State Golden Gloves
Gold medal – first place	1974 Florida State Golden Gloves	featherweight

Pan American Games
Bronze medal – third place	1975 Pan American Games	featherweight

Carlos Calderon is a retired boxer from Puerto Rico who competed at the 1976 Summer Olympics.

== 1976 Olympic record ==
Below is the Olympic record of Carlos Calderon, a Puerto Rican featherweight boxer who competed at the 1976 Montreal Olympics:

- Round of 64: defeated Boukary Assakande (Burkina Faso) by walkover
- Round of 32: lost to Angel Pacheco (Venezuela) by decision, 0-5
