= Siraj-ud-Din =

Pakistani boxer

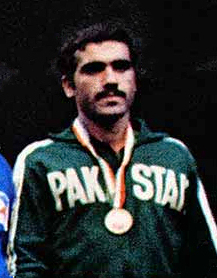
- Siraj-ud-Din at the 1974 Asian Games

Sport
- Sport: Boxing
Medal record
Representing Pakistan
Asian Games
Bronze medal – third place	1974 Tehran	-71 kg

Siraj-ud-Din is a retired Pakistani amateur boxer. He won a bronze medal at the 1974 Asian Games and competed at the 1976 Olympics, where he was eliminated in a quarterfinal bout.

== 1976 Olympic results ==
Below is the record of Siraj Din, a Pakistani middleweight boxer who competed at the 1976 Montreal Olympics:

- Round of 32: defeated Nicolas Arredondo (Mexico) referee stopped contest in the third round
- Round of 16: bye
- Quarterfinal: lost to Rufat Riskiyev (Soviet Union) referee stopped contest in the second round
