= Yordan Lesov =

Bulgarian boxer

Personal information
- Nationality: Bulgarian
- Born: 19 December 1959 (age 65)

Sport
- Sport: Boxing

Yordan Lesov (born 19 December 1959) is a Bulgarian boxer. He competed in the men's lightweight event at the 1980 Summer Olympics.
