= Ángel Pacheco (boxer) =

Venezuelan boxer (born 1952)

Personal information
- Nationality: Venezuelan
- Born: 21 November 1952 (age 73)

Sport
- Sport: Boxing
Medal record
Men's amateur boxing
Representing Venezuela
Pan American Games
| Bronze medal – third place | 1975 Mexico City | Bantamweight |

Ángel Pacheco (born 21 November 1952) is a Venezuelan boxer. He competed in the men's featherweight event at the 1976 Summer Olympics.

== 1976 Olympic results ==
Below is the record of Angel Pacheco at the 1976 Montreal Olympics:

- Round of 64: defeated Sandalio Calderon (Colombia) by decision, 5-0
- Round of 32: defeated Carlos Calderon (Puerto Rico) by decision, 5-0
- Round of 16: lost to Angel Herrera (Cuba) by decision, 0-5
