= Choi Chung-il =

South Korean boxer (born 1958)

Personal information
- Nationality: South Korean
- Born: 2 April 1958 (age 68)

Sport
- Sport: Boxing

Choi Chung-il (born 2 April 1958) is a South Korean boxer. He competed in the men's featherweight event at the 1976 Summer Olympics.
