= Alfredo Pérez (boxer) =

Venezuelan boxer (born 1952)

Personal information
- Full name: Alfredo A. Pérez
- Born: 11 February 1952 (age 74)
- Height: 158 cm (5 ft 2 in)
Medal record
Men's boxing
Representing Venezuela
World Amateur Championships
Silver medal – second place	1974 Havana	Flyweight
Pan American Games
Bronze medal – third place	1975 Mexico City	Flyweight
Central American and Caribbean Games
Gold medal – first place	1974 Santo Domingo	Flyweight
Bolivarian Games
Gold medal – first place	1973 Panama	-48 kg

Alfredo A. Pérez (born 11 February 1952) is a retired Venezuelan boxer. He competed for his South American nation at the 1976 Summer Olympics in Montreal, Quebec, Canada. There, he was defeated in the Men's Flyweight (– 51 kg) division by Poland's eventual bronze medal winner Leszek Błażyński. Pérez won the gold medal in the same weight division at the 1974 Central American and Caribbean Games in Santo Domingo, Dominican Republic.
