= Luis Martínez (Cuban boxer) =

Cuban boxer (born 1955)

Medal record

Men's Boxing

Representing Cuba

Olympic Games
Bronze medal – third place	1976 Montreal	Middleweight

World Amateur Championships
Silver medal – second place	1978 Belgrade	Light Middleweight

Luis Felipe Martínez Sánchez (born May 26, 1955) is a retired Cuban boxer, who represented his native country at the 1976 Summer Olympics in Montreal, Quebec, Canada. There he won the bronze medal in the middleweight division (– 71 kg) after being defeated in the semifinals by Rufat Riskiyev from the Soviet Union. Two years later he won the silver medal at the second World Championships in Belgrade.
