= Fazlija Šaćirović =

Yugoslav boxer (born 1957)

Personal information
- Nationality: Yugoslav
- Born: 4 May 1957 (age 68)

Sport
- Sport: Boxing

Fazlija Šaćirović (born 4 May 1957) is a Yugoslav boxer. He competed at the 1976 Summer Olympics and the 1980 Summer Olympics. At the 1980 Summer Olympics, he lost to Veli Koota of Finland.
