= Davey Armstrong =

American boxer (1956–2021)

Personal information
- Born: Davey Lee Armstrong; June 9, 1956 Puyallup, Washington, U.S.
- Died: February 8, 2021 (aged 64)

Boxing career
Medal record
Men's Boxing
Representing United States
Pan American Games
Gold medal – first place	1975 Mexico City	Featherweight

Davey Lee Armstrong (June 9, 1956 – February 8, 2021) was a boxer from the United States.

== Amateur career ==
Armstrong was born in Puyallup, Washington, and began boxing at the Tacoma Boys Club, along with future world champions Rocky Lockridge and Johnny Bumphus, as well as 1972 Olympic Gold Medalist Sugar Ray Seales and 1976 Gold Medalist and professional World Champion, Leo "The Lion" Randolph.

Armstrong represented the US at the 1972 Summer Olympics. He was eliminated in the second round of the men's light flyweight division (– 48 kg) by bronze medalist Enrique Rodríguez. Armstrong also was a member of the American Olympic team at the 1976 Montreal Olympics. He competed as a featherweight and was eliminated in the quarterfinals.

=== Amateur highlights ===
- 1972 National AAU Champion (106 lb)
- 1972 U.S. Olympian (106 lb)
- 1973 National AAU Runner-up (119 lb), lost to Mike Hess of Albany, Oregon, in the final by decision.
- 1975 National AAU Champion (125 lb)
- Won the gold medal at the 1975 Pan American Games.
- 1976 National AAU Champion (125 lb)
- 1976 U.S. Olympian (Placed Fifth)
- 1979 National AAU Champion (132 lb)

== 1976 Olympic results ==
Below is the record of Davey Armstrong, an American featherweight boxer who competed at the 1976 Montreal Olympics:

- Round of 64: bye
- Round of 32: defeated Anatoly Volkov (Soviet Union) by decision, 5-0
- Round of 16: defeated Tibor Badari (Hungary) by decision, 5-0
- Quarterfinal: lost to Angel Herrera (Cuba) by decision, 2-3

== Pro career ==
David (Davey) started boxing out of the Tacoma Boy's Club Gym under the tutelage of Joe Clough. Armstrong turned pro as a lightweight on March 28, 1980 and boxed out of the Kronk Gym in Detroit. He was a kind and gentle man and rarely if ever had a bad word for anyone. Armstrong retired in 1983 after 27 bouts (24 wins and 3 losses).

== Life after boxing ==
Armstrong lived in Puyallup, Washington, and worked for the City of Seattle as a bookkeeper. He died from dementia on February 8, 2021.

== Honors ==
- 2005 Inductee into the Tacoma (Pierce County) Sports Hall of Fame
