= Jong Jo-ung =

North Korean boxer (born 1957)

Personal information
- Native name: 정조웅
- Nationality: North Korean
- Born: 17 June 1957 (age 68)

Sport
- Sport: Boxing

Jong Jo-ung (born 17 June 1957) is a North Korean boxer. He competed at the 1976 Summer Olympics and the 1980 Summer Olympics. At the 1980 Summer Olympics, he defeated Rabani Ghulam of Afghanistan, before losing to Viktor Demyanenko of the Soviet Union.
