= Boxing at the 1976 Summer Olympics =

Boxing at the Games of the XXI Olympiad
- Dates: 18-31 July 1976
- Competitors: 266 from 54 nations

There were eleven boxing events at the 1976 Summer Olympics in Montreal, Quebec, Canada. The competition was held from 18 to 31 July with the participation of 266 fighters from 54 countries.

== Medalists ==
Event	Gold	Silver	Bronze
Light flyweight	Jorge Hernández; Cuba	Ri Byong-uk; North Korea	Orlando Maldonado; Puerto Rico; Payao Pooltarat; Thailand
Flyweight	Leo Randolph; United States	Ramón Duvalón; Cuba	Leszek Blazynski; Poland; David Torosyan; Soviet Union
Bantamweight	Gu Yong-Ju; North Korea	Charles Mooney; United States	Patrick Cowdell; Great Britain; Viktor Rybakov; Soviet Union
Featherweight	Ángel Herrera; Cuba	Richard Nowakowski; East Germany	Leszek Kosedowski; Poland; Juan Paredes; Mexico
Lightweight	Howard Davis; United States	Simion Cuțov; Romania	Ace Rusevski; Yugoslavia; Vassily Solomin; Soviet Union
Light welterweight	Ray Leonard; United States	Andrés Aldama; Cuba	Vladimir Kolev; Bulgaria; Kazimierz Szczerba; Poland
Welterweight	Jochen Bachfeld; East Germany	Pedro Gamarro; Venezuela	Reinhard Skricek; West Germany; Victor Zilberman; Romania
Light middleweight	Jerzy Rybicki; Poland	Tadija Kačar; Yugoslavia	Rolando Garbey; Cuba; Viktor Savchenko; Soviet Union
Middleweight	Michael Spinks; United States	Rufat Riskiyev; Soviet Union	Luis Martínez; Cuba; Alec Năstac; Romania
Light heavyweight	Leon Spinks; United States	Sixto Soria; Cuba	Costică Dafinoiu; Romania; Janusz Gortat; Poland
Heavyweight	Teófilo Stevenson; Cuba	Mircea Şimon; Romania	Clarence Hill; Bermuda; John Tate; United States

== Medal table ==
Rank	Nation	Gold	Silver	Bronze	Total
1	United States	5	1	1	7
2	Cuba	3	3	2	8
3	East Germany	1	1	0	2
3	North Korea	1	1	0	2
5	Poland	1	0	4	5
6	Romania	0	2	3	5
7	Soviet Union	0	1	4	5
8	Yugoslavia	0	1	1	2
9	Venezuela	0	1	0	1
10	Bermuda	0	0	1	1
10	Bulgaria	0	0	1	1
10	Great Britain	0	0	1	1
10	Mexico	0	0	1	1
10	Puerto Rico	0	0	1	1
10	Thailand	0	0	1	1
10	West Germany	0	0	1	1
Totals (16 entries)		11	11	22	44
