= Boxing at the 1976 Summer Olympics – Light flyweight =

Olympic boxing tournament

Light flyweight boxing at the Games of the XXI Olympiad
- Venue: Maurice Richard Arena, Montreal
- Dates: 19–31 July 1976
- Competitors: 27 from 27 nations

Medalists
1st place, gold medalist(s)		Jorge Hernández	Cuba
2nd place, silver medalist(s)		Ri Byong-uk	North Korea
3rd place, bronze medalist(s)		Orlando Maldonado	Puerto Rico
3rd place, bronze medalist(s)		Payao Pooltarat	Thailand

The men's light flyweight event was part of the boxing programme at the 1976 Summer Olympics. The weight class was the lightest contested, and allowed boxers of up to 48 kilograms to compete. The competition was held from 19 to 31 July 1976. 27 boxers from 27 nations competed.

== Medalists ==
Gold	Jorge Hernández; Cuba
Silver	Ri Byong-uk; North Korea
Bronze	Orlando Maldonado; Puerto Rico
Bronze	Payao Pooltarat; Thailand

== Results ==
The following boxers took part in the event:

Rank	Name	Country
1	Jorge Hernández	Cuba
2	Ri Byong-uk	North Korea
3T	Orlando Maldonado	Puerto Rico
3T	Payao Pooltarat	Thailand
5T	Armando Guevara	Venezuela
5T	Héctor Patri	Argentina
5T	György Gedó	Hungary
5T	Park Chan-hui	South Korea
9T	Dietmar Geilich	East Germany
9T	Oleksandr Tkachenko	Soviet Union
9T	Brendan Dunne	Ireland
9T	Ali Canay	Turkey
9T	Henryk Średnicki	Poland
9T	Serdambyn Batsükh otherwise Serdamba Batsuk	Mongolia
9T	Mohamed Said Abdel Wehab	Egypt
9T	Zoffa Yarawi	Papua New Guinea
17T	Eduardo Baltar	Philippines
17T	Louis Curtis	United States
17T	Remus Cosma	Romania
17T	Sayed Bashiri	Iran
17T	Noboru Uchiyama	Japan
17T	Sidney McKnight	Canada
17T	Eleoncio Mercedes	Dominican Republic
17T	Enrique Rodríguez	Spain
17T	José Leroy	France
17T	Abderrahim Najm	Morocco
17T	Beykhan Fuchedzhiev	Bulgaria

=== First round ===
- Armando Guevara (VEN) def. Eduardo Baltar (PHI), 5:0
- Li Byong-Uk (PRK) def. Sidney McKnight (CAN), KO-1
- Henryk Średnicki (POL) def. Louis Curtis (USA), 5:0
- Aleksandr Tkachenko (URS) def. Eleoncio Mercedes (DOM), RSC-1
- Payao Poontarat (THA) def. Remus Cosma (ROM), 4:1
- Serdamba Batsuk otherwise Serdambyn Batsükh (MGL) def. Enrique Rodríguez (ESP), RSC-3
- György Gedó (HUN) def. Said Bashiri (IRN), KO-2
- Orlando Maldonado(PUR) def. Lucky Mutale (ZAM), walk-over
- Brendan Dunne (IRL) def. Noboru Uchizama (JPN), RSC-2
- Said Mohamed Abdelwahab (EGY) def. José Leroy (FRA), KO-1
- Héctor Patri (ARG) def. Alodji Edoh (TOG), walk-over
- Chan-Hee Park (KOR) def. Abderahim Najim (MAR), DSQ-3
- Alican Az (TUR) def. Stephen Muchoki (KEN), walk-over
- Jorge Hernández (CUB) def. Beyhan Fuchedzhiev (BUL), RSC-3
- Zoffa Yarawi (PNG) def. Venostos Ochira (UGA), walk-over

=== Second round ===
- Armando Guevara (VEN) def. Dietmar Geilich (GDR), 5:0
- Li Byong-Uk (PRK) def. Henryk Średnicki (POL), 3:2
- Payao Poontarat (THA) def. Aleksandr Tkachenko (URS), 3:2
- György Gedó (HUN) def. Serdamba Batsuk (MGL), 5:0
- Orlando Maldonado (PUR) def. Brendan Dunne (IRL), KO-1
- Héctor Patri (ARG) def. Said Mohamed Abdelwahab (EGY), walk-over
- Chan-Hee Park (KOR) def. Alican Az (TUR), 5:0
- Jorge Hernández (CUB) def. Zoffa Zarawi (PNG), KO-3

=== Quarterfinals ===
- Li Byong-Uk (PRK) def. Armando Guevara (VEN), 3:2
- Payao Poontarat (THA) def. György Gedó (HUN), 4:1
- Orlando Maldonado (PUR) def. Héctor Patri (ARG), 5:0
- Jorge Hernández (CUB) def. Chan-Hee Park (KOR), 3:2

=== Semifinals ===
- Li Byong-Uk (PRK) def. Payao Poontarat (THA), RSC-2
- Jorge Hernández (CUB) def. Orlando Maldonado (PUR), 5:0

=== Final ===
- Jorge Hernández (CUB) def. Li Byong-Uk (PRK), 4:1
