= Boxing at the 1980 Summer Olympics – Light flyweight =

Boxing competitions

Light flyweight boxing at the Games of the XXII Olympiad
- Venue: Olympiysky Sports Complex
- Date: 21 July – 2 August 1980
- Competitors: 22 from 22 nations

Medalists
1st place, gold medalist(s)		Shamil Sabirov	Soviet Union
2nd place, silver medalist(s)		Hipólito Ramos	Cuba
3rd place, bronze medalist(s)		Li Byong-uk	North Korea
3rd place, bronze medalist(s)		Ismail Mustafov	Bulgaria

The light flyweight boxing competition at the 1980 Olympic Games in Moscow was held from 21 July to 2 August at the Olympiysky Sports Complex. 22 boxers from 22 nations competed.

== Schedule ==
Date	Time	Round
Monday, 21 July 1980	12:00; 18:00	Round of 32
Friday, 25 July 1980	12:00; 18:00	Round of 16
Tuesday, 29 July 1980	13:00	Quarterfinals
Thursday, 31 July 1980	13:00	Semifinals
Saturday, 2 August 1980	15:00	Final

== Results ==
=== Finals ===
Semifinals
Hipólito Ramos (CUB)	4
Ismail Mustafov (BUL)	1
Shamil Sabirov (URS)	5
Li Byong-uk (PRK)	0

Final
Hipólito Ramos (CUB)	2
Shamil Sabirov (URS)	3

=== Top half ===
Round of 32

Round of 16
Farid Salman Makhdi (IRQ)	0
Hipólito Ramos (CUB)	5
Charles Lubulwa (UGA)
György Gedó (HUN)	RSC
Ismail Mustafov (BUL)	5
Gerard Hawkins (IRL)	0
Ahmed Saïd (ALG)	5
Lincoln Salcedo (ECU)	0

Quarterfinals
Hipólito Ramos (CUB)	5
György Gedó (HUN)	0
Ismail Mustafov (BUL)	5
Ahmed Siad (ALG)	0

Semifinals
Hipólito Ramos (CUB)	4
Ismail Mustafov (BUL)	1

=== Bottom half ===
Round of 32
Dietmar Geilich (GDR)	3
Birender Singh Thapa (IND)	2
Singkham Phongpratith (LAO)
Pedro Nieves (VEN)	RSC
Beruk Asfaw (ETH)
Antti Juntumaa (FIN)	KO
Adel Hammoude (SYR)
Dumitru Șchiopu (ROU)	KO
Henryk Pielesiak (POL)	2
Li Byong-uk (PRK)	3
Vanduin Bayasgalan (MGL)	1
Gilberto Sosa (MEX)	4

Round of 16
Shamil Sabirov (URS)	5
João Manuel Miguel (POR)	0
Dietmar Geilich (GDR)	5
Pedro Nieves (VEN)	0
Antti Juntumaa (FIN)	1
Dumitru Șchiopu (ROU)	4
Li Byong-uk (PRK)	3
Gilberto Sosa (MEX)	2

Quarterfinals
Shamil Sabirov (URS)	4
Dietmar Geilich (GDR)	1
Dumitru Șchiopu (ROU)	1
Li Byong-uk (PRK)	4

Semifinals
Shamil Sabirov (URS)	5
Li Byong-uk (PRK)	0
