= Ri Byong-uk =

North Korean boxer

Personal information
- Born: November 7, 1954 (age 71)

Sport

Korean name
- Hangul: 리병욱
- RR: Ri Byeonguk
- MR: Ri Pyŏnguk
Medal record
Men's boxing
Representing North Korea
Olympic Games
Silver medal – second place	1976 Montreal	Light Flyweight
Bronze medal – third place	1980 Moscow	Light Flyweight
Asian Games
Silver medal – second place	1978 Bangkok	Light Flyweight

Ri Byong-uk (born November 7, 1954) is a retired North Korean boxer, who won two Olympic medals in the men's Light Flyweight (48 kg) category.

== Olympic results ==
1976

- Defeated Sidney McKnight (Canada) KO 1
- Defeated Henryk Średnicki (Poland) 3-2
- Defeated Armando Guevara (Venezuela) 3-2
- Defeated Payao Poontarat (Thailand) RSC 2
- Lost to Jorge Hernández (Cuba) 1-4

1980

- Defeated Henryk Pielesiak (Poland) 3-2
- Defeated Gilberto Sosa (Mexico) 3-2
- Defeated Dumitru Şchiopu (Romania) 4-1
- Lost to Shamil Sabirov (Soviet Union) 0-5
