= Jorge Hernández (boxer) =

Cuban boxer (1954–2019)

Personal information
- Full name: Jorge Hernández Padron
- Born: 17 November 1954 Havana, Cuba
- Died: 12 December 2019 (aged 65)
- Height: 1.70 m (5 ft 7 in)
- Weight: 47 kg (104 lb)

Sport
- Sport: Boxing
- Weight class: Light Flyweight
Medal record
Men's boxing
Representing Cuba
Olympic Games
| Gold medal – first place | 1976 Montreal | Light Flyweight |
World Championships
| Gold medal – first place | 1974 Havana | Light Flyweight |
| Silver medal – second place | 1978 Belgrade | Light Flyweight |
Pan American Games
| Gold medal – first place | 1975 Mexico City | Light Flyweight |
Central American and Caribbean Games
| Gold medal – first place | 1974 Santo Domingo | Light Flyweight |

Jorge Hernández Padron (Note: In this Spanish name, the first or paternal surname is Hernández and the second or maternal family name is Padron.) (17 November 1954 – 12 December 2019) born in Havana was a boxer from Cuba, who represented his native country at the 1976 Summer Olympics in Montreal, Canada. There he won the gold medal in the light flyweight division (– 48 kg) by defeating North Korea's Li Byong-Uk in the final. Four years later, when Moscow hosted the Games, he was eliminated in the second round in the flyweight division (– 51 kg).

Hernández won the world title at the inaugural 1974 World Championships in Havana, Cuba, followed by the silver medal four years later, when Belgrade hosted the World Championships. He also captured the gold at the 1975 Pan American Games.

== Results ==
=== 1976 Olympic Games ===
- Round of 32 Defeated Beyhan Fuchedzhiev (Bulgaria) RSC 3
- Round of 16: Defeated Zoffa Yarawi (Papua New Guinea) KO 3
- Quarterfinal: Defeated Chan-Hee Park (South Korea) by decision, 3–2
- Semifinal: Defeated Orlando Maldonado (Puerto Rico) by decision, 5–0
- Final: Defeated Li Byong-Uk (North Korea) 4–1 (won gold medal)

=== 1979 Pan American Games ===
- Defeated Manuel Mariona (El Salvador) points
- Lost to Jerome Coffee (United States) points

=== 1980 Olympic Games ===
- 1st round bye
- Lost to Viktor Miroshnichenko (Soviet Union) by decision, 1–4
