= José Gómez Mustelier =

Cuban boxer

Medal record

Men's boxing

Representing Cuba

Olympic Games
Gold medal – first place	1980 Moscow	Middleweight

World Amateur Championships
Gold medal – first place	1978 Belgrade	Middleweight

Pan American Games
Gold medal – first place	1979 San Juan	Middleweight

Central American and Caribbean Games
Gold medal – first place	1978 Medellin	Middleweight

José Gómez Mustelier a.k.a. Jovani Gomez (born January 28, 1959, in Colombia, Cuba) is a Cuban retired boxer, who won the middleweight gold medal at the 1980 Summer Olympics. In the final he defeated Viktor Savchenko of the USSR on points (4–1). Two years earlier he captured the world title at the second World Championships in Belgrade, followed by the gold medal at the 1979 Pan American Games.

== Olympic results ==
- Defeated Enock Chama (Zambia) 3–2
- Defeated Jang Bong-mun (North Korea) KO 2
- Defeated Valentin Silaghi (Romania) 5–0
- Defeated Viktor Savchenko (USSR) 4–1
