= Hipólito Ramos =

Cuban boxer (born 1956)

Olympic medal record

Men's boxing
Silver medal – second place	1980 Moscow	Light flyweight

Hipólito Ramos Martínez (born January 30, 1956) is a retired boxer from Cuba, who won the silver medal in the Light Flyweight division (-48 kg) at the 1980 Summer Olympics in Moscow. In the final he lost to Shamil Sabirov of the Soviet Union on points (2-3).

== Olympic results ==
Below are the results of Hipólito Ramos, a Cuban light flyweight boxer who competed at the 1980 Moscow Olympics:

- Round of 16: Defeated Farid Salman Mahdi (Iraq) on points, 5-0
- Quarterfinal: Defeated Gyorgy Gedo (Hungary) on points, 5-0
- Semifinal: Defeated Ismail Mustafov (Bulgaria) on points, 4-1
- Final: Lost to Shamil Sabirov (Soviet Union) on points, 2-3 (was awarded silver medal)
