= John Martins =

John Martins may refer to:

- John Martin's, a chain of department stores in South Australia
- John Martins (boxer) (born 1950), Nigerian boxer
