= Héctor Patri =

Argentine boxer

Personal information
- Born: 14 December 1956 (age 69) La Plata, Argentina
- Height: 1.50 m (4 ft 11 in)
- Weight: Light-flyweight; Mini-flyweight

Boxing career

Boxing record
- Total fights: 87
- Wins: 48
- Win by KO: 9
- Losses: 26
- Draws: 13

Héctor Luis Patri (born 12 December 1956) is an Argentine former professional boxer who competed from 1977 to 1994, challenging for the IBF light flyweight title in 1991. As an amateur, he represented his country in the light-flyweight division at the 1976 Summer Olympics, defeating Alodji Edoh and Mohamed Said Abdel Wehab before losing his third match against Orlando Maldonado.

== Professional boxing record ==
| 87 fights | 48 wins | 26 losses |
|---|---|---|
| By knockout | 9 | 0 |
| By decision | 38 | 26 |
| By disqualification | 1 | 0 |
| Draws | 13 | |

| No. | Result | Record | Opponent | Type | Round, time | Date | Location | Notes |
|---|---|---|---|---|---|---|---|---|
| 87 | Loss | 48–26–13 | Carlos Eluaiza | UD | 12 | 10 Sep 1994 | Las Flores, Argentina | For FAB Argentinian mini flyweight title |
| 86 | Win | 48–25–13 | Alli Galvez | DQ | 11 (12) | 17 Jul 1993 | Mar del Plata, Argentina | Retained South American mini flyweight title |
| 85 | Draw | 47–25–13 | Jose Luis Diaz | PTS | 10 | 21 May 1993 | La Plata, Argentina | |
| 84 | Win | 47–25–12 | Sandro Orlando Oviedo | RTD | 11 (12), 3:00 | 17 Feb 1993 | Mar del Plata, Argentina | Won vacant FAB Argentinian light flyweight title |
| 83 | Loss | 46–25–12 | Sandro Orlando Oviedo | PTS | 10 | 3 Oct 1992 | Estadio F.A.B., Buenos Aires, Argentina | |
| 82 | Draw | 46–24–12 | Jose Rafael Sosa | PTS | 10 | 4 Sep 1992 | La Plata, Argentina | |
| 81 | Win | 46–24–11 | Wilfredo Andrade | TKO | 10 (10) | 16 May 1992 | Argentina | |
| 80 | Loss | 45–24–11 | Cuauhtémoc Gomez | PTS | 10 | 27 Mar 1992 | Palacio de los Deportes, Mexico City, Mexico | |
| 79 | Loss | 45–23–11 | Vincenzo Belcastro | PTS | 10 | 11 Mar 1992 | San Pellegrino Terme, Italy | |
| 78 | Win | 45–22–11 | José Ramón Soto | PTS | 10 | 4 Oct 1991 | La Plata, Argentina | |
| 77 | Win | 44–22–11 | José Ramón Soto | PTS | 10 | 13 Sep 1991 | La Plata, Argentina | |
| 76 | Win | 43–22–11 | Guillermo Raul Torres | TKO | 7 (10) | 23 Aug 1991 | Buenos Aires, Argentina | |
| 75 | Win | 42–22–11 | Guillermo Raul Torres | PTS | 10 | 6 Jul 1991 | Las Flores, Argentina | |
| 74 | Loss | 41–22–11 | Michael Carbajal | UD | 12 | 10 May 1991 | John O’Donnell Stadium, Davenport, Iowa, U.S. | For IBF light flyweight title |
| 73 | Win | 41–21–11 | José Ramón Soto | PTS | 10 | 5 Apr 1991 | La Plata, Argentina | |
| 72 | Win | 40–21–11 | Angel Antonio Barros | PTS | 10 | 8 Sep 1990 | Tandil, Argentina | |
| 71 | Win | 39–21–11 | Horacio Agustin Barroso | TKO | 8 (10) | 6 Jul 1990 | Laboulaye, Argentina | |
| 70 | Win | 38–21–11 | Raúl Ojeda | UD | 10 | 3 Feb 1990 | Mar del Plata, Argentina | |
| 69 | Win | 37–21–11 | José Ramón Soto | PTS | 10 | 22 Dec 1989 | Benito Juárez, Argentina | |
| 68 | Win | 36–21–11 | Oscar Vergara | UD | 12 | 11 Nov 1989 | Villa Mercedes, Argentina | Won vacant South American mini flyweight title |
| 67 | Win | 35–21–11 | Ceferino Antonio Ponce | PTS | 10 | 15 Sep 1989 | La Plata, Argentina | |
| 66 | Win | 34–21–11 | Mario Gustavo Quintana | PTS | 12 | 11 Aug 1989 | Puerto Madryn, Argentina | Won vacant FAB Argentinian mini flyweight title |
| 65 | Win | 33–21–11 | Roberto Ledesma | PTS | 10 | 2 Jun 1989 | Argentina | |
| 64 | Win | 32–21–11 | Mario Gustavo Quintana | PTS | 10 | 4 Feb 1989 | Argentina | |
| 63 | Win | 31–21–11 | José Antonio Badilla | KO | 4 (12) | 16 Dec 1988 | Laboulaye, Argentina | Retained South American light flyweight title |
| 62 | Win | 30–21–11 | Jose Humberto Lagos | PTS | 12 | 7 Oct 1988 | Ushuaia, Argentina | Retained South American light flyweight title |
| 61 | Win | 29–21–11 | Ignacio Lindor Gorriti | PTS | 10 | 16 Sep 1988 | Salta, Argentina | |
| 60 | Loss | 28–21–11 | Carlos Gabriel Salazar | PTS | 10 | 2 Sep 1988 | Presidencia Roque Sáenz Peña, Argentina | |
| 59 | Loss | 28–20–11 | Gustavo Ballas | PTS | 10 | 12 Aug 1988 | Viedma, Argentina | |
| 58 | Loss | 28–19–11 | Jose Humberto Lagos | PTS | 12 | 26 Mar 1988 | Estadio F.A.B., Buenos Aires, Argentina | Lost FAB Argentinian light flyweight title |
| 57 | Win | 28–18–11 | José Antonio Badilla | PTS | 12 | 7 Nov 1987 | Ushuaia, Argentina | Won vacant South American light flyweight title |
| 56 | Win | 27–18–11 | Jaime Miranda | PTS | 10 | 14 Aug 1987 | Bariloche, Argentina | |
| 55 | Draw | 26–18–11 | Jose Humberto Lagos | PTS | 12 | 19 Jun 1987 | Villa Ángela, Argentina | Retained FAB Argentinian light flyweight title |
| 54 | Win | 26–18–10 | Antonio Ricardo Eusebio Andrada | TKO | 9 (10) | 13 Mar 1987 | San Miguel de Tucumán, Argentina | |
| 53 | Loss | 25–18–10 | Santos Laciar | PTS | 10 | 30 Jan 1987 | Mar del Plata, Argentina | |
| 52 | Loss | 25–17–10 | Ruben Condori | PTS | 10 | 16 May 1986 | Salta, Argentina | |
| 51 | Win | 25–16–10 | Juan Alberto Ivalo | PTS | 10 | 12 Apr 1986 | Balcarce, Argentina | |
| 50 | Loss | 24–16–10 | Ramón Horacio Albers | PTS | 10 | 9 Aug 1985 | Concordia, Argentina | |
| 49 | Loss | 24–15–10 | Mario Alberto Demarco | PTS | 12 | 27 Jun 1985 | Ceres, Argentina | For FAB Argentinian light flyweight title |
| 48 | Draw | 24–14–10 | Alberto Pacheco | PTS | 10 | 10 May 1985 | Santa Fe, Argentina | |
| 47 | Draw | 24–14–9 | Ramon Jose Cufre | PTS | 10 | 8 Mar 1985 | Villa María, Argentina | |
| 46 | Win | 24–14–8 | Alberto Pacheco | PTS | 10 | 14 Dec 1984 | Concordia, Argentina | |
| 45 | Loss | 23–14–8 | Mario Alberto Demarco | PTS | 10 | 20 Sep 1984 | Río Grande, Argentina | |
| 44 | Loss | 23–13–8 | Ramon Jose Cufre | PTS | 10 | 6 Jul 1984 | Villa María, Argentina | |
| 43 | Loss | 23–12–8 | Mario Alberto Demarco | PTS | 10 | 8 Jun 1984 | Río Gallegos, Argentina | |
| 42 | Loss | 23–11–8 | Adrián Daniel Román | PTS | 10 | 4 May 1984 | Concordia, Argentina | |
| 41 | Loss | 23–10–8 | Mveleli Luzipho | PTS | 10 | 4 Feb 1984 | Border Rugby Grounds, East London, South Africa | |
| 40 | Win | 23–9–8 | Rodolfo Rodríguez | PTS | 10 | 16 Dec 1983 | Concordia, Argentina | |
| 39 | Loss | 22–9–8 | Mario Alberto Demarco | PTS | 12 | 19 Nov 1983 | Estadio Luna Park, Buenos Aires, Argentina | For FAB Argentinian light flyweight title |
| 38 | Win | 22–8–8 | Rodolfo Rodríguez | PTS | 10 | 9 Sep 1983 | La Plata, Argentina | |
| 37 | Loss | 21–8–8 | Ramón Horacio Albers | PTS | 10 | 5 Aug 1983 | San Nicolás de los Arroyos, Argentina | |
| 36 | Draw | 21–7–8 | Miguel Angel Lazarte | PTS | 10 | 22 Jul 1983 | Mar del Plata, Argentina | |
| 35 | Loss | 21–7–7 | Alberto Pacheco | PTS | 10 | 8 Jul 1983 | Gobernador Crespo, Argentina | |
| 34 | Win | 21–6–7 | Alberto Pacheco | PTS | 10 | 6 May 1983 | La Plata, Argentina | |
| 33 | Win | 20–6–7 | Juan Alberto Ivalo | PTS | 10 | 11 Mar 1983 | La Plata, Argentina | |
| 32 | Loss | 19–6–7 | Miguel Angel Lazarte | PTS | 12 | 22 Dec 1982 | Tres Arroyos, Argentina | Lost FAB Argentinian light flyweight title |
| 31 | Draw | 19–5–7 | Juan Alberto Ivalo | PTS | 12 | 10 Sep 1982 | La Plata, Argentina | Retained FAB Argentinian light flyweight title |
| 30 | Loss | 19–5–6 | Rodolfo Rodríguez | PTS | 12 | 2 Jul 1982 | La Plata, Argentina | For South American light flyweight title |
| 29 | Win | 19–4–6 | Domingo Santos Aragon | PTS | 10 | 19 Mar 1982 | San Nicolás de los Arroyos, Argentina | |
| 28 | Draw | 18–4–6 | Ruben Paniagua | PTS | 10 | 6 Feb 1982 | Daireaux, Argentina | |
| 27 | Win | 18–4–5 | Miguel Angel Lazarte | PTS | 12 | 18 Dec 1981 | La Plata, Argentina | Retained FAB Argentinian light flyweight title |
| 26 | Win | 17–4–5 | Jaime Miranda | PTS | 8 | 28 Nov 1981 | Santiago, Chile | |
| 25 | Draw | 16–4–5 | Rodolfo Rodríguez | TD | 8 (12) | 9 Oct 1981 | La Plata, Argentina | For South American light flyweight title |
| 24 | Win | 16–4–4 | Jose Roque Ibiris | PTS | 10 | 24 Jun 1981 | La Plata, Argentina | |
| 23 | Win | 15–4–4 | Alex Miranda | TD | 7 (10) | 12 Jun 1981 | La Plata, Argentina | |
| 22 | Win | 14–4–4 | Rodolfo Rodríguez | PTS | 12 | 11 Apr 1981 | La Plata, Argentina | Won vacant FAB Argentinian light flyweight title |
| 21 | Draw | 13–4–4 | Ruben Condori | TD | 3 (10) | 15 Jan 1981 | Salta, Argentina | |
| 20 | Win | 13–4–3 | Hermogenes Murillo | PTS | 10 | 8 Nov 1980 | Estadio Luna Park, Buenos Aires, Argentina | |
| 19 | Win | 12–4–3 | Jose Roque Ibiris | PTS | 10 | 26 Sep 1980 | La Plata, Argentina | |
| 18 | Win | 11–4–3 | Jose Luis Lopez | PTS | 10 | 22 Aug 1980 | La Plata, Argentina | |
| 17 | Loss | 10–4–3 | Carlos Reyes Sosa | PTS | 10 | 18 Jul 1980 | Villa María, Argentina | |
| 16 | Loss | 10–3–3 | Félix Ramón Colman | PTS | 10 | 19 Jun 1980 | Posadas, Argentina | |
| 15 | Draw | 10–2–3 | Miguel Angel Lazarte | PTS | 10 | 6 Jun 1980 | General Acha, Argentina | |
| 14 | Draw | 10–2–2 | Fernando Sagredo | PTS | 10 | 23 Apr 1980 | Santiago, Chile | |
| 13 | Win | 10–2–1 | Domingo Santos Aragon | PTS | 10 | 8 Mar 1980 | Estadio Luna Park, Buenos Aires, Argentina | |
| 12 | Win | 9–2–1 | Jose Roque Ibiris | PTS | 8 | 8 Feb 1980 | Mar del Plata, Argentina | |
| 11 | Win | 8–2–1 | Federico Condori | PTS | 10 | 25 Jan 1980 | Salta, Argentina | |
| 10 | Loss | 7–2–1 | Domingo Santos Aragon | PTS | 10 | 2 Nov 1979 | Rosario, Argentina | |
| 9 | Win | 7–1–1 | Luis Edmundo Gomez | PTS | 10 | 15 Jun 1979 | La Plata, Argentina | |
| 8 | Win | 6–1–1 | Jose Roque Ibiris | PTS | 10 | 20 Apr 1979 | San Miguel de Tucumán, Argentina | |
| 7 | Loss | 5–1–1 | Ramón Rodriguez | PTS | 10 | 2 Mar 1979 | San Miguel de Tucumán, Argentina | |
| 6 | Win | 5–0–1 | Ruben Paniagua | PTS | 10 | 10 Nov 1978 | La Plata, Argentina | |
| 5 | Win | 4–0–1 | Reynaldo Romero | PTS | 8 | 7 Jul 1978 | La Plata, Argentina | |
| 4 | Win | 3–0–1 | Oscar Chausqui | KO | 6 (8) | 5 May 1978 | La Plata, Argentina | |
| 3 | Win | 2–0–1 | Juan Alberto Ivalo | KO | 3 (6) | 7 Apr 1978 | La Plata, Argentina | |
| 2 | Draw | 1–0–1 | Ruben Condori | PTS | 6 | 17 Feb 1978 | Salta, Argentina | |
| 1 | Win | 1–0 | Jose Luis Zarate | KO | 1 (6) | 7 Dec 1977 | La Plata, Argentina | |
