= Louis Curtis =

American boxer

Personal information
- Nationality: American
- Born: March 14, 1955 (age 71) Washington, D.C., United States

Sport
- Sport: Boxing

Louis Curtis (born March 14, 1955) is an American boxer. He competed in the men's light flyweight event at the 1976 Summer Olympics. He lost in the first round to Henryk Średnicki of Poland.
