= Asfaw =

Asfaw (Amharic: አስፋው) is a male name of Ethiopian origin that may refer to:

- Asfaw Wossen Taffari, birth name of Amha Selassie (1916–1997), the last reigning Emperor of Ethiopia
- Berhane Asfaw (born 1954), Ethiopian paleontologist
- Beruk Asfaw (born 1960), Ethiopian Olympic boxer
- Gashaw Asfaw (born 1978), Ethiopian marathon runner
- Menen Asfaw (1891–1962), wife and consort of Emperor Haile Selassie I
