= Kim Cheol-ho =

Kim Cheol-ho or Kim Chŏl-ho (김철호) may refer to:

- Kim Chul-ho (boxer) (born 1961), South Korean boxer
- Kim Cheol-ho (footballer) (born 1983), South Korean footballer
