= Orlando Maldonado =

Puerto Rican boxer

Medal record

Representing Puerto Rico

Men's Boxing

Olympic Games
Bronze medal – third place	1976 Montreal	Light Flyweight

Orlando Maldonado (born May 21, 1959, in Bayamón, Puerto Rico) is a Puerto Rican former professional boxer who competed from 1977 to 1984, challenging for the WBC super flyweight title in 1983. As an amateur, he won the bronze medal in the men's light flyweight (– 48 kg) division at the 1976 Summer Olympics. It was the second medal ever for Puerto Rico, after boxer Juan Evangelista Venegas captured the bronze medal in 1948.

== Amateur career ==
Maldonado was the 1977 National Golden Gloves Flyweight champion, while boxing out of Miami, Florida.

=== Olympic Results ===
- Defeated Lucky Mutale (Zambia) walk-over
- Defeated Brendan Dunne (Ireland) KO 1
- Defeated Héctor Patri (Argentina) 5-0
- Lost to Jorge Hernández (Cuba) 0-5

== Professional career ==
Maldonado turned professional in 1977 and in 1983 challenged Rafael Orono for the WBC super flyweight title but lost via TKO. Maldonado also lost once to International Boxing Hall of Fame member Miguel Canto and to Ramon Nery. Maldonado retired in 1984 with a record of 26-5-2 with 13 KO's.

== Professional boxing record ==
34 fights	27 wins	5 losses
By knockout	14	4
By decision	13	0
By disqualification	0	1
Draws	2	

No.	Result	Record	Opponent	Type	Round, time	Date	Location	Notes
34	Loss	27–5–2	Valerio Nati	TKO	5 (10)	May 26, 1984	Mario Morales Coliseum, Guaynabo, Puerto Rico	
33	Loss	27–4–2	Rafael Orono	TKO	5 (12), 0:41	Oct 29, 1983	Gimnasio José Beracasa, Caracas, Venezuela	For WBC super-flyweight title
32	Win	27–3–2	Víctor Bultron	UD	10	May 27, 1983	Mario Morales Coliseum, Guaynabo, Puerto Rico	
31	Win	26–3–2	Juan Bruno	KO	1 (10)	Mar 21, 1983	Juan Ramón Loubriel Stadium, Bayamón, Puerto Rico	
30	Win	25–3–2	Jesse Sierra	TKO	6 (10)	Dec 4, 1982	Jai Alai Fronton, Miami, Florida, U.S.	
29	Win	24–3–2	Pascual Polanco	SD	10	Oct 2, 1982	Convention Center, Miami Beach, Florida, U.S.	
28	Win	23–3–2	Wilfredo Padrón	UD	10	Aug 27, 1982	Convention Center, Miami Beach, Florida, U.S.	
27	Win	22–3–2	Jaime Miranda	PTS	10	Jul 23, 1982	Convention Center, Miami Beach, Florida, U.S.	
26	Win	21–3–2	Justo Jorge	KO	1	Nov 7, 1981	Palacio de Recreación y Deportes, Mayagüez, Puerto Rico	
25	Loss	20–3–2	Ramon Nery	TKO	8 (10)	May 2, 1981	Auditorio Juan Pachín Vicéns, Ponce, Puerto Rico	
24	Win	20–2–2	Luis Tapia	TKO	9 (10)	Apr 2, 1981	Coliseo Municipal, Trujillo Alto, Puerto Rico	
23	Loss	19–2–2	Prudencio Cardona	KO	5 (10)	Dec 13, 1980	Jai Alai Fronton, Miami, Florida, U.S.	
22	Loss	19–1–2	Miguel Canto	DQ	6 (10), 2:24	Oct 18, 1980	Plaza de Toros Nuevo Progreso, Guadalajara, Mexico	Maldonado was disqualified for illegal use of his head that caused a bad cut over Canto's right eye
21	Win	19–0–2	Enrique Guadamuz	KO	1 (12)	Aug 23, 1980	Roberto Clemente Coliseum, San Juan, Puerto Rico	Won vacant WBC FECARBOX flyweight title
20	Win	18–0–2	Pascual Polanco	UD	10	Jul 10, 1980	Cancha Municipal, San Juan, Puerto Rico	
19	Win	17–0–2	Maximo Rodríguez	TKO	3 (10)	Jun 12, 1980	Cancha Municipal, San Juan, Puerto Rico	
18	Win	16–0–2	Tito Roque	UD	10	Apr 27, 1980	Hiram Bithorn Stadium, San Juan, Puerto Rico	
17	Win	15–0–2	Arturo Tebaqui	KO	10 (10), 0:53	Feb 3, 1980	Caesars Palace, Paradise, Nevada, U.S.	
16	Win	14–0–2	Darryl Jones	UD	10	Oct 26, 1979	Madison Square Garden, New York City, New York, U.S.	
15	Win	13–0–2	José Ortíz	KO	3 (12)	Sep 22, 1979	Estudios de Teleluz, San Juan, Puerto Rico	Retained Puerto Rican flyweight title
14	Win	12–0–2	Renzo Peña	TKO	3 (10)	Aug 11, 1979	Coliseo Municipal, Trujillo Alto, Puerto Rico	
13	Win	11–0–2	Luis Burgos	TKO	3 (12)	Jun 16, 1979	Roberto Clemente Coliseum, San Juan, Puerto Rico	Won vacant Puerto Rican flyweight title
12	Win	10–0–2	Elpidio de Paula	UD	8	Apr 28, 1979	Coliseo Municipal, Trujillo Alto, Puerto Rico	
11	Win	9–0–2	Julio Guerrero	UD	8	Jan 14, 1979	Hiram Bithorn Stadium, San Juan, Puerto Rico	
10	Draw	8–0–2	Julio Guerrero	PTS	8	Oct 16, 1978	Santo Domingo, Santo Domingo Province, Dominican Republic	
9	Win	8–0–1	José Latimer	KO	5 (6)	Sep 28, 1978	Cancha Municipal, San Juan, Puerto Rico	
8	Win	7–0–1	José Latimer	PTS	6	Aug 14, 1978	Cancha Municipal, San Juan, Puerto Rico	
7	Win	6–0–1	Ramón Luis Pérez	PTS	6	Jul 16, 1978	San Juan, Puerto Rico	Not listed on BoxRec
6	Win	5–0–1	José Latimer	KO	4	Apr 18, 1978	San Juan, Puerto Rico	Not listed on BoxRec
5	Draw	4–0–1	Peterson Marin	PTS	4	Oct 8, 1977	Cancha Manuel Carrasquillo Herpen, Carolina, Puerto Rico	
4	Win	4–0	Peterson Marin	KO	4	Aug 21, 1977	Carolina, Puerto Rico	Not listed on BoxRec
3	Win	3–0	Ramón Luis Pérez	UD	4	Jul 11, 1977	Roberto Clemente Coliseum, San Juan, Puerto Rico	
2	Win	2–0	Tim Alexander	KO	3	Jun 9, 1977	Philipsburg, Sint Maarten, Kingdom of the Netherlands	Uncertain match; Not listed on BoxRec
1	Win	1–0	Roberto Pina	KO	2	May 6, 1977	Usa, Kyushu, Japan	Uncertain match; Not listed on BoxRec
