= Kostadin Folev =

Bulgarian boxer

Personal information
- Nationality: Bulgarian
- Born: 1 March 1955 (age 70)

Sport
- Sport: Boxing

Kostadin Folev (born 1 March 1955) is a Bulgarian boxer. He competed in the men's middleweight event at the 1980 Summer Olympics. At the 1980 Summer Olympics, he lost to Manfred Trauten of East Germany.
