= Rafael Orono =

Venezuelan boxer (born 1958)

Personal information
- Nickname: Pantono
- Born: Jesus Rafael Orono; August 30, 1958 (age 68) Pantoño, Estado Sucre, Venezuela
- Height: 5 ft 7 1/2 in (171 cm)
- Weight: Super flyweight; Bantamweight

Boxing career
- Reach: 68 in (173 cm)
- Stance: Orthodox

Boxing record
- Total fights: 41
- Wins: 32
- Win by KO: 16
- Losses: 7
- Draws: 2
Medal record
Men's Boxing
Representing Venezuela
Central American and Caribbean Games
| Gold medal – first place | 1978 Medellin | Flyweight |

Jesus Rafael Orono (born August 30, 1958) is a former boxer from Venezuela. He won the inaugural WBC super-flyweight title in 1980, thus becoming the very first champion in the division.

== Amateur career ==
Born in Patono, Sucre, Orono began as an amateur and compiled a record of 49 wins and 8 losses.

=== Amateur highlights ===
- Central American Games champion (Medillin, Colombia)
- Silver Medal "Copa de los Reyes" (Romania)
- Boxan Champion 1977 & 1978
- Bronze at the Cordova Cardin, Cuba

== Professional boxing career ==
Orono turned professional in 1979. In his 11th professional fight the following year, the then-undefeated Orono captured the inaugural WBC super-flyweight title, winning a decision over Seung-Hoon Lee. He successfully defended his title three times, before losing it to Chul-Ho Kim in 1981 by KO. He recaptured the title in a 1982 rematch with Kim, winning by TKO. Orono defended his belt three more times including against Mexican challenger Raul Valdez, before losing it to Payao Poontarat by decision in 1983. In 1985, he took on WBA super-flyweight title holder Khaosai Galaxy, but lost by TKO. Orono retired from boxing in 1988.

== Professional boxing record ==
| 41 fights | 32 wins | 7 losses |
|---|---|---|
| By knockout | 16 | 4 |
| By decision | 16 | 3 |
| Draws | 2 | |

| No. | Result | Record | Opponent | Type | Round, time | Date | Location | Notes |
|---|---|---|---|---|---|---|---|---|
| 41 | Loss | 32–7–2 | Daniel Blanco | TKO | 9 (10) | Aug 13, 1988 | Plaza de Toros de Cartagena de Indias, Cartagena, Colombia | |
| 40 | Loss | 32–6–2 | Sugar Baby Rojas | UD | 10 | Jul 11, 1986 | Tamiami Fairgrounds Auditorium, Miami, Florida, U.S. | |
| 39 | Loss | 32–5–2 | Eudo Bermudez | KO | 1 (10) | Dec 21, 1985 | Caracas, Venezuela | |
| 38 | Loss | 32–4–2 | Edgar Monserrat | UD | 10 | Oct 5, 1985 | Gimnasio Nuevo Panama, Panama City, Panama | |
| 37 | Loss | 32–3–2 | Khaosai Galaxy | TKO | 5 (15) | Jul 21, 1985 | Rajadamnern Stadium, Bangkok, Thailand | For WBA super flyweight title |
| 36 | Win | 32–2–2 | Hector Martinez | PTS | 10 | Mar 24, 1985 | Santo Domingo, Dominican Republic | |
| 35 | Win | 31–2–2 | Valerio Zea | UD | 10 | Nov 10, 1984 | Concorde Boxing Arena, Oranjestad, Aruba | |
| 34 | Draw | 30–2–2 | Eudo Bermudez | PTS | 10 | Oct 6, 1984 | Concorde Boxing Arena, Oranjestad, Aruba | |
| 33 | Win | 30–2–1 | Luis Navarro | PTS | 10 | Apr 2, 1984 | Caracas, Venezuela | |
| 32 | Loss | 29–2–1 | Payao Poontarat | SD | 12 | Nov 27, 1983 | Grand Palace Hotel, Pattaya, Thailand | Lost WBC super flyweight title |
| 31 | Win | 29–1–1 | Orlando Maldonado | TKO | 5 (12) | Oct 29, 1983 | Coliseo Naciones Unidas, Caracas, Venezuela | Retained WBC super flyweight title |
| 30 | Win | 28–1–1 | Raul Valdez | UD | 12 | May 9, 1983 | Hilton Hotel, Caracas, Venezuela | Retained WBC super flyweight title |
| 29 | Win | 27–1–1 | Pedro Romero | KO | 4 (12) | Jan 31, 1983 | El Poliedro, Caracas, Venezuela | Retained WBC super flyweight title |
| 28 | Win | 26–1–1 | Kim Chul-ho | TKO | 6 (15) | Nov 28, 1982 | Changchung Gymnasium, Seoul, South Korea | Won WBC super flyweight title |
| 27 | Win | 25–1–1 | Victor Gonzalez | KO | 1 (10) | Aug 30, 1982 | El Tigre, Venezuela | |
| 26 | Win | 24–1–1 | Francisco Quiroz | PTS | 10 | Jun 21, 1982 | Cumaná, Venezuela | |
| 25 | Win | 23–1–1 | Leopoldo Frias | KO | 2 (10) | May 24, 1982 | Cumaná, Venezuela | |
| 24 | Win | 22–1–1 | Dorismel Zuniga | KO | 2 (10) | Apr 12, 1982 | Barquisimeto, Venezuela | |
| 23 | Win | 21–1–1 | Seoul-Chon Hwang | PTS | 10 | Feb 22, 1982 | Valencia, Venezuela | |
| 22 | Win | 20–1–1 | Rafael Julio | TKO | 1 (10) | Dec 13, 1981 | Carúpano, Venezuela | |
| 21 | Win | 19–1–1 | Oscar Bolivar | PTS | 10 | Nov 16, 1981 | Ciudad Bolívar, Venezuela | |
| 20 | Win | 18–1–1 | Johnny Jackson | TKO | 2 (10) | Oct 19, 1981 | Caracas, Venezuela | |
| 19 | Win | 17–1–1 | Franklin Martinez | TKO | 8 (10) | Aug 10, 1981 | Caracas, Venezuela | |
| 18 | Win | 16–1–1 | Francisco Gonzalez | KO | 4 (10) | Jun 29, 1981 | El Poliedro, Caracas, Venezuela | |
| 17 | Win | 15–1–1 | Javier Brown | TKO | 10 (10) | May 9, 1981 | Caracas, Venezuela | |
| 16 | Win | 14–1–1 | Kim Sung-jun | PTS | 10 | Apr 6, 1981 | Caracas, Venezuela | |
| 15 | Loss | 13–1–1 | Kim Chul-ho | KO | 9 (15) | Jan 24, 1981 | Plaza Monumental, San Cristóbal, Venezuela | Lost WBC super flyweight title |
| 14 | Win | 13–0–1 | Jovito Rengifo | TKO | 3 (15) | Sep 15, 1980 | Domo Bolivariano, Barquisimeto, Venezuela | Retained WBC super flyweight title |
| 13 | Draw | 12–0–1 | Willie Jensen | MD | 15 | Jul 28, 1980 | Nuevo Circo, Caracas, Venezuela | Retained WBC super flyweight title |
| 12 | Win | 12–0 | Ramon Balbino Soria | UD | 15 | Apr 14, 1980 | Nuevo Circo, Caracas, Venezuela | Retained WBC super flyweight title |
| 11 | Win | 11–0 | Lee Seung-hoon | SD | 15 | Feb 2, 1980 | Nuevo Circo, Caracas, Venezuela | Won inaugural WBC super flyweight title |
| 10 | Win | 10–0 | Jorge Vargas | TKO | 9 (10) | Dec 19, 1979 | Caracas, Venezuela | |
| 9 | Win | 9–0 | Luis A Burgos | PTS | 10 | Oct 26, 1979 | Caracas, Venezuela | |
| 8 | Win | 8–0 | Jorge Cruz | TKO | 2 (10) | Sep 29, 1979 | Santa Bárbara, Venezuela | |
| 7 | Win | 7–0 | Edgar Roman | SD | 12 | Sep 15, 1979 | Nuevo Circo, Caracas, Venezuela | Won vacant Venezuelan bantamweight title |
| 6 | Win | 6–0 | Aureliano Castillo | PTS | 10 | Aug 11, 1979 | Caracas, Venezuela | |
| 5 | Win | 5–0 | Enrique Pinto | KO | 3 (?) | Jul 21, 1979 | Caracas, Venezuela | |
| 4 | Win | 4–0 | Henry Diaz | PTS | 10 | Jun 2, 1979 | Caracas, Venezuela | |
| 3 | Win | 3–0 | Alfredo Mendoza | TKO | 3 (4) | May 6, 1979 | Caracas, Venezuela | |
| 2 | Win | 2–0 | Hernan Palacios | PTS | 4 | Mar 18, 1979 | Caracas, Venezuela | |
| 1 | Win | 1–0 | Victor Idrogo | PTS | 4 | Feb 18, 1979 | Caracas, Venezuela | |

== After boxing ==
In 2025, Orono was honored by the Venezuelan Sports Ministry. W.B.C. president Mauricio Sulaiman awarded him a new world championship belt as part of the ceremony.

== See also ==
- List of world super-flyweight boxing champions
- List of Venezuelans

Sporting positions
Regional boxing titles
| Vacant Title last held by Jose Antonio Quijano | Venezuelan bantamweight champion September 15, 1979 – February 2, 1980; Won world title | Vacant Title next held by Edgar Roman |
World boxing titles
| Inaugural champion | WBC super-flyweight champion February 2, 1980 – January 24, 1981 | Succeeded by Kim Chul-ho |
| Preceded by Kim Chul-ho | WBC super-flyweight champion November 28, 1982 – November 27, 1983 | Succeeded by Payao Poontarat |
