= Payao Poontarat =

Thai boxer and politician

Payao Poontarat PCh, PM
- พเยาว์ พูลธรัตน์

Member of the House of Representatives
- In office 2001–2005

Personal details
- Party: Democrat Party
- Boxing career
- Nationality: Thai
- Born: Payao Poontarat; October 18, 1956 Bang Sapan, Thailand
- Died: August 13, 2006 (aged 49) Bangkok, Thailand
- Weight: Super flyweight
- Stance: Orthodox

Boxing record
- Total fights: 14
- Wins: 10
- Win by KO: 7
- Losses: 4
Medal record
Representing Thailand
Olympic Games
Bronze medal – third place	1976 Montreal	Light Flyweight
Southeast Asian Games
Bronze medal – third place	1977 Kuala Lumpur	Flyweight

Payao Poontarat (Thai: พเยาว์ พูลธรัตน์, RTGS: Phayao Phuntharat, pronounced [pʰā.jāw pʰūːn.tʰā.rát]; October 18, 1956 – August 13, 2006) was a Thai boxer who, at the age of 18, won the bronze medal in the men's Light flyweight (-48 kg) category at the 1976 Summer Olympics. He was the first Thai athlete to win an Olympic medal in any sport. After retiring from boxing, Payao Poontarat briefly competed in Muay Thai. His professional Muay Thai record is 10-3-1 (3 KOs).

== 1976 Olympic results ==
Below is the record of Payao Poontarat, a Thai light flyweight boxer who competed at the 1976 Montreal Olympics:

- Defeated Remus Cosma (Romania) by decision, 4-1
- Defeated Aleksandr Tkachenko (Soviet Union) by decision, 3-2
- Defeated György Gedó (Hungary) by decision, 4-1
- Lost to Li Byong-Uk (North Korea) referee stooped contest in the second round (was awarded a bronze medal)

== Boxing career ==
Born in the village of Bang Sapan, Prachuap Khiri Khan, Phayao Poontarat came from a poor family. As a child, he sold flowers in the resort city of Pattaya to help support his younger siblings. Like many poor boys in Thailand, he took up Muay Thai, and he proved to be a gifted boxer under the ring name "Petchpayao Sitkrutat" (เพชรพะเยาว์ ศิษย์ครูทัศน์).

He switched to international boxing and won a place on the Thai Olympic team in 1976. Though he finished with a bronze medal, Phayao gained attention by defeating the 1972 Olympic gold medal winner, Gyogy Gedo, in the quarter-finals. He trained hard for the 1980 Moscow Olympics, but his hopes for a gold were ended by the United States led boycott over of the Soviet Union's invasion of Afghanistan.

Instead, he turned professional and on November 27, 1983 became WBC superflyweight world champion by defeating Rafael Orono of Venezuela in a split decision. In his first title defence, against Guty Espadas of Mexico, Phayao was behind on all the score cards, but saved his championship belt with a 10th-round knockout. Phayao was then challenged by Japan's Jiro Watanabe and agreed to meet him. When they met in Osaka on July 5, 1984 Phayao lost by a controversial 12-round decision. The World Boxing Council viewed the tape and ordered a rematch. It took place in November, with Phayao losing by a technical knockout in the 11th round.

== Political career ==
Giving up boxing, Phayao Poontarat became a Thai policeman with the rank of captain. He joined the Democrat Party and in 2001 was elected as member of parliament for his home-province.

== Personal life and death ==
In 2002, he began to suffer from amyotrophic lateral sclerosis, also known as Lou Gehrig's disease. The disease is incurable. In 2006, Phayao died at the age of 48 at Siriraj Hospital in Bangkok. He was survived by his wife and several children.

== Professional boxing record ==
14 fights	10 wins	4 losses
By knockout	7	1
By decision	3	3

No.	Result	Record	Opponent	Type	Round	Date	Location	Notes
14	Loss	10–4	Kongtoranee Payakaroon	PTS	10	Apr 2, 1985	Bangkok, Thailand	
13	Loss	10–3	Jiro Watanabe	TKO	11 (12)	Nov 29, 1984	Prefectural Gymnasium, Kumamoto, Kumamoto, Japan	For WBC super flyweight title
12	Loss	10–2	Jiro Watanabe	SD	12	Jul 5, 1984	Osaka-Jo Hall, Osaka, Osaka, Japan	Lost WBC super flyweight title
11	Win	10–1	Guty Espadas	TKO	10 (12)	Mar 28, 1984	Rajadamnern Stadium, Bangkok, Thailand	Retained WBC super flyweight title
10	Win	9–1	Tharhahin Boosetha	TKO	2 (10)	Feb 5, 1984	Channel 7 Studios, Bangkok, Thailand	
9	Win	8–1	Rafael Orono	SD	12	Nov 27, 1983	Grand Palace Hotel, Pattaya, Thailand	Won WBC super flyweight title
8	Win	7–1	Ernesto Guevara	TKO	5 (10)	Jul 6, 1983	Rajadamnern Stadium, Bangkok, Thailand	
7	Win	6–1	Juan Diaz	PTS	10	Mar 24, 1983	Bangkok, Thailand	
6	Win	5–1	Alonzo Gonzalez	PTS	10	Feb 10, 1983	Bangkok, Thailand	
5	Win	4–1	Kwang Suk Lee	KO	5 (10)	Nov 28, 1982	Bangkok, Thailand	
4	Win	3–1	Dan Pisanchai	KO	9 (10)	Oct 10, 1982	Bangkok, Thailand	
3	Loss	2–1	Kwon Soon-chun	PTS	12	May 7, 1982	Changchung Gymnasium, Seoul, South Korea	For OPBF super flyweight title
2	Win	2–0	Jimmy Boy	KO	4 (10)	Mar 21, 1982	Araneta Coliseum, Barangay Cubao, Quezon City, Metro Manila, Philippines	
1	Win	1–0	Tito Abella	KO	2 (10)	Oct 4, 1981	Bangkok, Thailand	

== Muay Thai record ==
Muay Thai Record
Date	Result	Opponent	Event	Location	Method	Round	Time
1980-07-07	Win	(Thailand) Somnoi Bankhod	Lumpinee Stadium	Bangkok, Thailand	Decision	5	3:00
1978-03-17	Loss	(Thailand) Singthong Prasopchai	Lumpinee Stadium	Bangkok, Thailand	Decision	5	3:00
1977-11-17	Loss	(Thailand) Orachunnoi Hor Mahachai	Rajadamnern Stadium	Bangkok, Thailand	Decision	5	3:00
1977-09-09	Win	(Thailand) Singthong Prasopchai	Lumpinee Stadium	Bangkok, Thailand	KO (Punch)	3	
1977-08-01	Loss	(Thailand) Bangsai Khongkhalai	Rajadamnern Stadium	Bangkok, Thailand	Decision	5	3:00
1977-05-02	Win	(Thailand) Rittiroj Lukkhaokwang	Rajadamnern Stadium	Bangkok, Thailand	Decision	5	3:00
1977-04-04	Win	(Thailand) Phanomthian Sakmanuchai	Rajadamnern Stadium	Bangkok, Thailand			
1975-04-07	Loss	(Thailand) Anantachai Singbangsaen	Rajadamnern Stadium	Bangkok, Thailand	Decision	5	3:00
Legend: Win Loss Draw/No contest Notes

Achievements
Preceded by Rafael Orono	WBC super flyweight champion November 27, 1983 - July 5, 1984	Succeeded by Jiro Watanabe
