= Lincoln Salcedo =

Ecuadorian boxer

Personal information
- Nationality: Ecuadorian

Sport
- Sport: Boxing

Lincoln Salcedo is an Ecuadorian boxer. He competed in the men's light flyweight event at the 1980 Summer Olympics. At the 1980 Summer Olympics, he lost to Ahmed Saïd of Algeria.
