= Light flyweight =

Weight class in boxing

Light flyweight, also known as junior flyweight or super strawweight, is a weight class in boxing.

== Professional boxing ==
The weight limit at light flyweight in professional boxing is 108 pounds (49 kilograms). When New York legalized boxing in 1920, the law stipulated a "junior flyweight" class, with a weight limit of 99 pounds. When the National Boxing Association was formed in 1921, it also recognized this weight class. However, on January 19, 1922, the NBA decided to withdraw recognition of the junior flyweight division. On December 31, 1929, the New York State Athletic Commission also abolished the junior flyweight class. No champion had been crowned in this division prior to its abolition.

The World Boxing Council (WBC) decided to resurrect this division in the 1970s. The first champion in this division was Franco Udella, who won the WBC title in 1975. The World Boxing Association also crowned its first champion in 1975, when Jaime Rios defeated Rigoberto Marcano via fifteen-round decision. The first International Boxing Federation champion was Dodie Boy Peñalosa, who won the belt in 1983.

The first light flyweight "superfight" took place on March 13, 1993, when Michael Carbajal, the IBF champion, knocked out WBC champion Humberto González to unify the championship. Their rematch, on February 19, 1994, was the first time a light flyweight fighter (Carbajal) made a million dollar purse.

=== Current world champions ===
Sanctioning body	Reign began	Champion	Record	Defenses
WBA	December 17, 2025	René Santiago	16–4 (9 KO)	1
WBC	March 15, 2026	Shokichi Iwata	16–2 (13 KO)	1
IBF	June 19, 2025	Thanongsak Simsri	40–1 (35 KO)	2
WBO	March 13, 2025	René Santiago	16–4 (9 KO)	2

=== Current The Ring world rankings ===
As of December 28, 2025.

Keys:

C Current The Ring world champion

Rank	Name	Record	Title(s)
C	vacant		
1	René Santiago	15–4 (9 KO)	WBO, WBA
2	Carlos Cañizales	28–3–1 (20 KO)	WBC
3	Thanongsak Simsri	39–1 (34 KO)	IBF
4	Kyosuke Takami	10–1 (8 KO)	
5	Shokichi Iwata	14–2 (11 KO)	
6	Regie Suganob	16–1 (6 KO)	
7	Christian Araneta	25–3 (6 KO)	
8	Erick Badillo	17–0 (8 KO)	
9	Masataka Taniguchi	19–5 (13 KO)	
10	Sivenathi Nontshinga	13–2 (10 KO)	

== Amateur boxing ==
At the Summer Olympic Games, the division is defined as up to 49 kilograms.

=== Olympic champions ===
- 1968 – Francisco Rodríguez (VEN)
- 1972 – György Gedó (HUN)
- 1976 – Jorge Hernández (CUB)
- 1980 – Shamil Sabirov (URS)
- 1984 – Paul Gonzales (USA)
- 1988 – Ivailo Marinov (BUL)
- 1992 – Rogelio Marcelo (CUB)
- 1996 – Daniel Petrov (BUL)
- 2000 – Brahim Asloum (FRA)
- 2004 – Yan Bartelemí Varela (CUB)
- 2008 – Zou Shiming (CHN)
- 2012 – Zou Shiming (CHN)
- 2016 – Hasanboy Dusmatov (UZB)

=== European champions ===
- 1969 – (Hungary) György Gedó (HUN)
- 1971 – (Hungary) György Gedó (HUN)
- 1973 – (Soviet Union) Vladislav Sasypko (URS)
- 1975 – (Soviet Union) Aleksandr Tkachenko (URS)
- 1977 – (Poland) Henryk Średnicki (POL)
- 1979 – (Soviet Union) Shamil Sabirov (URS)
- 1981 – (Bulgaria) Ismail Mustafov (BUL)
- 1983 – (Bulgaria) Ismail Mustafov (BUL)
- 1985 – (East Germany) René Breitbarth (GDR)
- 1987 – (Soviet Union) Nszan Munczian (URS)
- 1989 – (Bulgaria) Ivailo Marinov (BUL)
- 1991 – (Bulgaria) Ivailo Marinov (BUL)
- 1993 – (Bulgaria) Daniel Petrov (BUL)
- 1996 – (Bulgaria) Daniel Petrov (BUL)
- 1998 – (Russia) Sergey Kazakov (RUS)
- 2000 – (Ukraine) Valeriy Sydorenko (UKR)
- 2002 – (Russia) Sergey Kazakov (RUS)
- 2004 – (Russia) Sergey Kazakov (RUS)
- 2006 – (Russia) David Ayrapetyan (RUS)
- 2008 – (Armenia) Hovhannes Danielyan (ARM)
- 2010 – (Republic of Ireland) Paddy Barnes (IRL)
- 2011 – (Azerbaijan) Salman Alizade (AZE)
- 2013 – (Russia) David Ayrapetyan (RUS)

=== Pan American champions ===
- 1971 – (Cuba) Rafael Carbonell (CUB)
- 1975 – (Cuba) Jorge Hernández (CUB)
- 1979 – (Cuba) Héctor Ramírez (CUB)
- 1983 – (Puerto Rico) Rafael Ramos (PUR)
- 1987 – (Puerto Rico) Luis Román Rolón (PUR)
- 1991 – (Cuba) Rogelio Marcelo (CUB)
- 1995 – (Venezuela) Edgar Velázquez (VEN)
- 1999 – (Cuba) Maikro Romero (CUB)
- 2003 – (Cuba) Yan Bartelemí Varela (CUB)
- 2007 – (United States) Luis Yáñez (USA)
- 2011 – (Mexico) Joselito Velázquez (MEX)

== Notable light flyweights ==
- Iván Calderón
- Michael Carbajal
- Jung-Koo Chang
- Luis Estaba
- Leo Gámez
- Humberto González
- Yoko Gushiken
- Louisa Hawton
- Yuh Myung-woo
- Donnie Nietes
- Saman Sorjaturong
- Román González
- Naoya Inoue
- Ryoichi Taguchi
- Adrián Hernández
- Ricardo López
- Franco Udella
