= Ali Canay =

Turkish boxer

Personal information
- Nationality: Turkish
- Born: 10 June 1955 (age 69)

Sport
- Sport: Boxing

Ali Canay (born 10 June 1955) is a Turkish boxer. He competed in the men's light flyweight event at the 1976 Summer Olympics.
