= Kim Chul-ho (boxer) =

South Korean boxer (born 1961)

Chul-Ho Kim
Personal information
- Nationality: (South Korea) South Korean
- Born: Kim Chul-Ho; March 3, 1961 (age 65) Osan, Gyeonggi Province, South Korea
- Height: 5 ft 6 in (1.68 m)
- Weight: Super flyweight

Boxing career
- Stance: Orthodox

Boxing record
- Total fights: 24
- Wins: 19
- Win by KO: 9
- Losses: 3
- Draws: 2
- No contests: 0

Kim Chul-Ho (Korean: 김철호; Hanja: 金喆鎬; born March 3, 1961, in Osan, Gyeonggi Province, South Korea) is a former boxer from South Korea.

In 1981, Kim became the WBC Super Flyweight champion with a 9-round KO win over Rafael Orono in San Cristóbal, Venezuela. He defended the belt five times, including a win over future multiple time world champion Jiro Watanabe, before losing it back to Rafael Orono in 1982.

== Professional boxing record ==
24 fights	19 wins	3 losses
By knockout	9	1
By decision	10	2
Draws	2	

No.	Result	Record	Opponent	Type	Round, time	Date	Location	Notes
24	Loss	19–3–2	Prayurasak Muangsurin	PTS	10	23 Oct 1983	Deagu Gymnasium, Daegu, South Korea	
23	Loss	19–2–2	Rafael Orono	TKO	6 (15), 0:38	28 Nov 1982	Changchung Gymnasium, Seoul, South Korea	Lost WBC super-flyweight title
22	Draw	19–1–2	Raúl Valdez	MD	15	4 Jul 1982	Chungmu Gymnasium, Daejeon, South Korea	Retained WBC super-flyweight title
21	Win	19–1–1	Koko Ishii	KO	8 (15), 0:47	10 Feb 1982	Gyeongbuk Gymnasium, Daegu, South Korea	Retained WBC super-flyweight title
20	Win	18–1–1	Jackal Maruyama	TKO	9 (15), 1:12	18 Nov 1981	Gudeok Gymnasium, Busan, South Korea	Retained WBC super-flyweight title
19	Win	17–1–1	Willie Jensen	KO	13 (15), 1:18	29 Jul 1981	Gudeok Gymnasium, Busan, South Korea	Retained WBC super-flyweight title
18	Win	16–1–1	Jiro Watanabe	UD	15	22 Apr 1981	Changchung Gymnasium, Seoul, South Korea	Retained WBC super-flyweight title
17	Win	15–1–1	Rafael Orono	KO	9 (15), 2:16	24 Jan 1981	Plaza Monumental, San Cristóbal, Venezuela	Won WBC super-flyweight title
16	Win	14–1–1	Berlin Olivetti	KO	3 (10), 2:24	2 Nov 1980	Seoul, South Korea	
15	Win	13–1–1	Choi Jung-keun	KO	2 (10), 2:38	26 Sep 1980	Munhwa Gymnasium, Seoul, South Korea	Retained South Korean super-flyweight title
14	Win	12–1–1	Choi Il-song	PTS	10	10 Aug 1980	Gudeok Gymnasium, Busan, South Korea	Won South Korean super-flyweight title
13	Win	11–1–1	Larry Enriquez	KO	6 (10), 2:07	30 Mar 1980	Munhwa Gymnasium, Seoul, South Korea	
12	Draw	10–1–1	Ha Kyung-ju	PTS	10	23 Feb 1980	Changchung Gymnasium, Seoul, South Korea	
11	Loss	10–1	Kim Young-hwan	PTS	10	11 Nov 1979	Gudeok Gymnasium, Busan, South Korea	
10	Win	10–0	Choi Il-song	PTS	10	29 Sep 1979	Munhwa Gymnasium, Seoul, South Korea	
9	Win	9–0	Sithmurong Sang	KO	3 (10), 2:11	25 Aug 1979	Changchung Gymnasium, Seoul, South Korea	
8	Win	8–0	Song Jae-young	PTS	8	1 Apr 1979	Munhwa Gymnasium, Seoul, South Korea	
7	Win	7–0	Kim Hak-dal	PTS	6	10 Feb 1979	Seoul, South Korea	
6	Win	6–0	Jung Kwan-soo	PTS	6	10 Dec 1978	Munhwa Gymnasium, Seoul, South Korea	
5	Win	5–0	Lee Kwang-suk	PTS	4	9 Dec 1978	Munhwa Gymnasium, Seoul, South Korea	
4	Win	4–0	Chung Hee-won	PTS	4	8 Dec 1978	Munhwa Gymnasium, Seoul, South Korea	
3	Win	3–0	Bae Suk-chul	PTS	4	7 Dec 1978	Munhwa Gymnasium, Seoul, South Korea	
2	Win	2–0	Kim Dong-young	TKO	3 (4), 1:20	29 Oct 1978	Munhwa Gymnasium, Seoul, South Korea	
1	Win	1–0	Bae Jae-kyu	PTS	4	7 Oct 1978	Seoul, South Korea	

Preceded by Rafael Orono	WBC Super Flyweight Champion; 24 January 1981 – 28 November 1982	Succeeded by Rafael Orono
