= John Martins (boxer) =

Nigerian boxer

Personal information
- Nationality: Nigerian
- Born: 7 October 1950 (age 74)

Sport
- Sport: Boxing

John Martins (born 7 October 1950) was a Nigerian boxer. He competed in the men's middleweight event at the 1980 Summer Olympics. At the 1980 Summer Olympics, he lost to Peter Odhiambo of Uganda.
