= Evgeny Gorstkov =

Soviet-Russian boxer (1950–2020)

Evgeny Nikolaevich Gorstkov Евгений Николаевич Горстков
Personal information
- Nationality: Soviet Union; Russia
- Born: 26 May 1950 Orsk, Russian SFSR, Soviet Union
- Died: 12 September 2020 (aged 70)

Boxing career
Medal record
Men's amateur boxing
Representing Soviet Union
European Championships
| Gold medal – first place | 1977 Halle | Heavyweight |
| Gold medal – first place | 1979 Cologne | Heavyweight |

Evgeny Nikolaevich Gorstkov (Russian: Евгений Николаевич Горстков, romanized: Evgeniy Nikolaevich Gorstkov; 26 May 1950 – 12 September 2020) was a Soviet-Russian boxer.

== Life and career ==
Gorstkov was born in Orsk.

Gorstkov competed at the 1977 European Amateur Boxing Championships, winning the gold medal in the heavyweight event. He also competed at the 1979 European Amateur Boxing Championships, winning the gold medal in the same event.

Gorstkov died on 12 September 2020, at the age of 70.
