= Valery Lvov =

Soviet-Russian boxer (1953–2025)

Personal information
- Nationality: Soviet Union; Russia
- Born: 20 February 1953 Cheboksary, Chuvash ASSR, Russian SFSR, USSR
- Died: 24 May 2025 (aged 72)

Boxing career
Medal record
Men's amateur boxing
Representing Soviet Union
European Championships
Silver medal – second place	1975 Spodek	Lightweight
World Championships
Gold medal – first place	1978 Belgrade	Light welterweight

Valery Konstantinovich Lvov (Russian: Валерий Константинович Львов; 20 February 1953 – 24 May 2025) was a Soviet-Russian boxer. He competed at the 1975 European Amateur Boxing Championships, winning the silver medal in the lightweight event. He also competed at the 1978 World Amateur Boxing Championships, winning the gold medal in the light welterweight event.

Lvov died on 24 May 2025, at the age of 72.
