= Enock Chama =

Zambian boxer

Personal information
- Nationality: Zambian

Sport
- Sport: Boxing

Enock Chama is a Zambian boxer. He competed in the men's middleweight event at the 1980 Summer Olympics. At the 1980 Summer Olympics, he lost to José Gómez Mustelier of Cuba.
