= Henryk Pielesiak =

Polish boxer

Personal information
- Nationality: Polish
- Born: 9 August 1955; Łódź, Poland
- Died: 25 October 2005 (aged 50); Łódź, Poland

Sport
- Sport: Boxing

Henryk Pielesiak (9 August 1955 – 25 October 2005) was a Polish boxer. He competed in the men's light flyweight event at the 1980 Summer Olympics. At the 1980 Summer Olympics, he lost to Ri Byong-uk of North Korea.
