= Sidney McKnight =

Canadian boxer

Sidney McKnight (born August 31, 1955 in Prince George, British Columbia) is a retired boxer from Canada, who represented his native country at the 1976 Summer Olympics. There he was defeated in the first round of the men's light flyweight division (– 48 kilograms) by eventual silver medalist Li Byong-Uk from North Korea.

== 1976 Olympic record ==
Below are the results of Sidney McKnight, a light flyweight boxer who competed for Canada at the 1976 Montreal Olympics:

- Round of 32: lost to Li Byong-Uk (North Korea) by a first-round knockout.

== Prince George Boxing ==
McKnight was inducted into the Prince George Hall of Fame.
