= Brendan Dunne =

Irish boxer

Personal information
- Nationality: Irish
- Born: 5 July 1955 (age 69); Dublin, Ireland
- Height: 160 cm (5 ft 3 in)
- Weight: 47 kg (104 lb)

Sport
- Country: Ireland
- Sport: Boxing

Brendan Dunne (born 5 July 1955) is an Irish Olympic boxer. He became the first light-flyweight boxer to represent Ireland at the Olympic Games when he competed at the 1976 Summer Olympics in Montreal. He won his first match against Noboru Uchiyama of Japan, and lost his second against the eventual bronze medalist, Orlando Maldonado of Puerto Rico.
