= Farid Salman =

Iranian boxer

Personal information
- Full name: Farid Salman Mahdi
- Nationality: Iraqi
- Born: 11 March 1957 (age 68)

Sport
- Sport: Boxing

Farid Salman Mahdi (Arabic: فريد سلمان مهدي, born 11 March 1957) is an Iraqi boxer. He competed in the men's light flyweight event at the 1980 Summer Olympics.
