= Antti Juntumaa =

Finnish boxer

Antti Eino Juntumaa (born 10 July 1959 in Muonio, Finnish Lapland) is a retired male boxer from Finland, who represented his native country at the 1980 Summer Olympics in Moscow, Soviet Union. There he lost in the second round of the men's light flyweight (– 48 kg) division to Romania's Dumitru Şchiopu.

== 1980 Olympic results ==
Below is the record of Antti Juntumaa, a Finnish light flyweight boxer who competed at the 1980 Moscow Olympics:

- Round of 32: defeated Beruk Asfaw (Ethiopia) by first-round knockout
- Round of 32: lost to Dumitru Şchiopu (Romania) by decision, 1-4
