= Valentin Silaghi =

Romanian boxer

Personal information
- Nationality: Romanian
- Born: 21 April 1957 (age 69) Bobâlna, Romania

Sport
- Sport: Boxing
Medal record
Representing Romania
Romania National Amateur Boxing Championships
Silver medal – second place	1977 Bucharest	Middleweight
Gold medal – first place	1978 Bucharest	Middleweight
Gold medal – first place	1980 Bucharest	Middleweight
Gold medal – first place	1981 Bucharest	Middleweight
Olympic Games
Bronze medal – third place	1980 Moscow	Middleweight
European Amateur Championships
Silver medal – second place	1979 Cologne	Middleweight
Bronze medal – third place	1981 Tampere	Middleweight

Valentin Silaghi (born April 19, 1957) is a retired boxer from Romania, who represented his native country at the 1980 Summer Olympics where he won a bronze medal. He also won three national senior titles and a silver and a bronze medal at the European Amateur Boxing Championships.

Currently he lives in Germany and coaches Luan Krasniqi.

== Amateur career ==
Silaghi won the bronze medal at the 1980 Moscow Olympic games. His results were:

- 1st round bye
- Defeated Alfred Thomas (Guyana) 5-0
- Defeated Mark Kaylor (Great Britain) 3-2
- Lost to José Gómez Mustelier (Cuba) 0-5
