= Birender Singh Thapa =

Indian boxer

Personal information
- Nationality: Indian
- Born: 10 February 1953
- Died: 2 October 2021 (aged 68)

Sport
- Sport: Boxing

Birender Singh Thapa (10 February 1953 – 2 October 2021) was an Indian boxer. He competed in the men's light flyweight event at the 1980 Summer Olympics. At the 1980 Summer Olympics, he lost to Dietmar Geilich of East Germany.
