= Sreten Mirković =

Serbian boxer

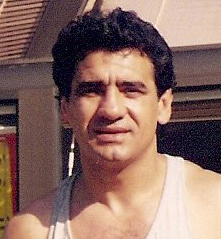
- Mirković in 1996

Personal information
- Nickname: Srele
- Nationality: Serbian
- Born: 15 February 1958 Priština, PR Serbia, FPR Yugoslavia
- Died: 28 September 2016 (aged 58) Požarevac, Serbia
- Height: 1.75 m (5 ft 9 in)
- Weight: Welterweight

Boxing career
- Stance: Orthodox

Boxing record
- Total fights: 498
- Wins: 480
- Losses: 18
Medal record
Men's Boxing
Representing Yugoslavia
European Amateur Championships
Silver medal – second place	1979 Cologne	Welterweight

Sreten Mirković (Serbian Cyrillic: Сретен Мирковић; 15 February 1958 – 28 September 2016) was a Serbian boxer. He had been referred to as a "legend of Serbian boxing".

== Career ==
In 1979, as a member of the Mladi Radnik Sports Society from Požarevac, Mirković won the silver medal at the European Amateur Boxing Championships.

=== Coaching ===
Mirković was a coach in the Kostolac Boxing Club and was a coach of the Mladi Radnik Boxing Club in Požarevac.

== Death ==
Mirković died of lung cancer on 28 September 2016 after a long illness. He is interred in the Požarevac Old Cemetery.
