= José Leroy =

French boxer

Personal information
- Nationality: French
- Born: 4 August 1957 (age 67)

Sport
- Sport: Boxing

José Leroy (born 4 August 1957) is a French boxer. He competed in the men's light flyweight event at the 1976 Summer Olympics.
