= Robert Pfitscher =

Austrian boxer

Personal information
- Nationality: Austrian
- Born: 25 October 1954 (age 70); Innsbruck, Austria

Sport
- Sport: Boxing

Robert Pfitscher (born 25 October 1954) is an Austrian boxer. He competed in the men's middleweight event at the 1980 Summer Olympics.
