= Vladislav Zasypko =

Soviet-Ukrainian boxer

Personal information
- Born: Владислав Петрович Засипко; January 22, 1953 (age 73) Stalino, Ukrainian SSR, USSR

Boxing career

Boxing record
- Total fights: 14
- Wins: 12
- Losses: 2
Medal record
Men's amateur boxing
Representing Soviet Union
European Amateur Boxing Championships
Gold medal – first place	1973 Belgrade	Light flyweight
Gold medal – first place	1975 Katowice	Flyweight
World Amateur Boxing Championships
Bronze medal – third place	1974 Havana	Flyweight

Vladislav Petrovich Zasypko (Ukrainian: Владислав Петрович Засипко, born January 22, 1953) is a Soviet-Ukrainian former amateur boxer and boxing coach whose career as an amateur boxer spanned from 1972 to 1978.

== Biography ==
Vladislav Petrovich Zasypko was born on January 22, 1953, in Stalino, Ukrainian SSR, USSR. Zasypko began boxing in 1965, joining DSO Spartak Donetsk in 1971 and joining SKA Donetsk in 1975. Following his victory in the 1975 European Amateur Boxing Championship, he was honored as a Master of Sports of the USSR. After retiring from boxing in 1978, Zasypko worked as a boxing coach at SDYuShOR Donetsk from 1981 to 1983.

== Amateur boxing record ==
14 fights	12 wins	2 losses
By decision	12	2

No.	Result	Record	Opponent	Type	Round	Date	Age	Location	Notes
14	Loss	12–2	(United States) Richard Savage	PTS	3	January 31, 1978	25 years, 9 days	(Soviet Union) Donetsk, Ukrainian SSR, USSR	Soviet Union vs. USA Meet
13	Win	12–1	(United States) Richard Rozelle	PTS	3	January 24, 1976	23 years, 2 days	(Soviet Union) Moscow, Russian SFSR, USSR	Soviet Union vs. USA Duel Matches
12	Win	11–1	(Romania) Constantin Gruiescu	SD	3	June 8, 1975	22 years, 137 days	Spodek, Katowice, Poland	European Championships – Final
11	Win	10–1	(Soviet Union) Suren Duryan	SD	3	March 30, 1975	22 years, 67 days	(Soviet Union) Tashkent, Uzbek SSR, USSR	
10	Win	9–1	(United States) Jesse Davidson	PTS	3	January 25, 1975	22 years, 3 days	(United States) Kiel Auditorium, St. Louis, Missouri, U.S.	USA vs. Soviet Union Meet
9	Win	8–1	(United States) Greg Richardson	RSCI	3	January 18, 1975	21 years, 361 days	(United States) Caesars Palace, Las Vegas, Nevada, U.S.	USA vs. Soviet Union Meet
8	Loss	7–1	(Cuba) Douglas Rodriguez	PTS	3	August 28, 1974	21 years, 218 days	Coliseo de la Ciudad, Havana, Cuba	World Championships – Flyweight – Semi-final
7	Win	7–0	(United States) Mike Ayala	PTS	3	May 15, 1974	21 years, 113 days	(Soviet Union) Moscow, Russian SFSR, USSR	United States vs. Soviet Union 112lb. bout
6	Win	6–0	(Bulgaria) Beyhan Fuchedzhiev	PTS	3	June 9, 1973	20 years, 138 days	(Socialist Federal Republic of Yugoslavia) Pionir Arena, Belgrade, SR Serbia, Yugoslavia	European Championships – Light flyweight – Final
5	Win	5–0	(Spain) Enrique Rodriguez Cal	PTS	3	June 7, 1973	20 years, 136 days	(Socialist Federal Republic of Yugoslavia) Pionir Arena, Belgrade, SR Serbia, Yugoslavia	European Championships – Light flyweight – Semi-final
4	Win	4–0	(Socialist Federal Republic of Yugoslavia) Dzafer Alisanovic	PTS	3	June 5, 1973	20 years, 134 days	(Socialist Federal Republic of Yugoslavia) Pionir Arena, Belgrade, SR Serbia, Yugoslavia	European Championships – Light flyweight – Quarter-final
3	Win	3–0	(United States) Jesse Trujillo	PTS	3	January 31, 1973	20 years, 9 days	(United States) Civic Auditorium, Omaha, Nebraska, U.S.	United States vs. Soviet Union bout
2	Win	2–0	(United States) Claudio Rivera	PTS	3	January 27, 1973	20 years, 5 days	(United States) Caesars Palace, Las Vegas, Nevada, US	United States vs. Soviet Union bout
1	Win	1–0	(United States) Tim Dement	PTS	3	February 11, 1972	19 years, 20 days	(Soviet Union) Mariupol, Ukrainian SSR, USSR	Soviet Union vs. USA Meet
