= Garfield McEwan =

English boxer

Personal information
- Nationality: England
- Born: 1953 or 1954 (age 71–72)
- Height: 6 ft 2 (Note: McEwan was 6 feet 2 in 1975) in (188 cm)

Boxing career
Medal record
Men's amateur boxing
Representing England
European Championships
Bronze medal – third place	1975 Katowice	Heavyweight

Garfield McEwan (born 1953/1954) (Note: McEwan was 21 years old in 1975) is an English boxer.

== Life and career ==
McEwan was a carpenter.

McEwan competed at the 1975 European Amateur Boxing Championships, winning the bronze medal in the heavyweight event.
