= Jesús Cabeza =

Venezuelan boxer

Personal information
- Nationality: Venezuelan
- Born: 30 October 1959 (age 65)

Sport
- Sport: Boxing

Jesús Cabeza (born 30 October 1959) is a Venezuelan boxer. He competed in the men's middleweight event at the 1980 Summer Olympics.
