= Sayed Bashiri =

Iranian boxer

Personal information
- Nationality: Iranian
- Born: 30 September 1951 (age 73)

Sport
- Sport: Boxing

Sayed Bashiri (born 30 September 1951) is an Iranian boxer. He competed in the men's light flyweight event at the 1976 Summer Olympics.
