= Boxing at the 1980 Summer Olympics – Middleweight =

Boxing competitions

Middleweight boxing at the Games of the XXII Olympiad
- Venue: Olympiysky Sports Complex
- Date: 24 July – 2 August 1980
- Competitors: 19 from 19 nations

Medalists
1st place, gold medalist(s)		José Gómez	Cuba
2nd place, silver medalist(s)		Viktor Savchenko	Soviet Union
3rd place, bronze medalist(s)		Valentin Silaghi	Romania
3rd place, bronze medalist(s)		Jerzy Rybicki	Poland

The middleweight boxing competition at the 1980 Olympic Games in Moscow was held from 24 July to 2 August at the Olympiysky Sports Complex. A total of 19 boxers, each representing a different nation, competed in the event.

== Schedule ==
Date	Time	Round
Thursday, 24 July 1980	18:00	Round of 32
Sunday, 27 July 1980	12:00; 18:00	Round of 16
Wednesday, 30 July 1980	13:00	Quarterfinals
Thursday, 31 July 1980	13:00	Semifinals
Saturday, 2 August 1980	15:00	Final

== Results ==
=== Finals ===
Semifinals
Valentin Silaghi (ROU)	0
José Gómez (CUB)	5
Jerzy Rybicki (POL)
Viktor Savchenko (URS)	RSC

Final
José Gómez (CUB)	4
Viktor Savchenko (URS)	1

=== Top half ===
Round of 32

Round of 16
Alfred Thomas (GUY)	0
Valentin Silaghi (ROU)	5
Carlos Fonseca (BRA)	1
Mark Kaylor (GBR)	4
Jesús Cabeza (VEN)
Jang Bong-mun (PRK)	KO
José Gómez (CUB)	3
Enock Chama (ZAM)	2

Quarterfinals
Valentin Silaghi (ROU)	3
Mark Kaylor (GBR)	2
Jang Bong-mun (PRK)
José Gómez (CUB)	KO

Semifinals
Valentin Silaghi (ROU)	0
José Gómez (CUB)	5

=== Bottom half ===
Round of 32
Viktor Savchenko (URS)	RSC
Damir Škaro (YUG)
Christer Corpi (SWE)
Étienne Loco Gbodolle (BEN)	DSQ
Manfred Trauten (GDR)	5
Kostadin Folev (BUL)	0

Round of 16
Tarmo Uusivirta (FIN)
Jerzy Rybicki (POL)	RSC
Peter Odhiambo (UGA)	KO
John Martins (NGR)
Robert Pfitscher (AUT)
Viktor Savchenko (URS)	RSC
Christer Corpi (SWE)
Manfred Trauten (GDR)	RSC

Quarterfinals
Jerzy Rybicki (POL)	5
Peter Odhiambo (UGA)	0
Viktor Savchenko (URS)	RSC
Manfred Trauten (GDR)

Semifinals
Jerzy Rybicki (POL)
Viktor Savchenko (URS)	RSC
