= Pedro Nieves =

Venezuelan boxer

Personal information
- Nationality: Venezuelan
- Born: 27 February 1961 (age 64)

Sport
- Sport: Boxing

Pedro Nieves (born 27 February 1961) is a Venezuelan boxer. He competed in the men's light flyweight event at the 1980 Summer Olympics. At the 1980 Summer Olympics, he defeated Singkham Phongpratith of Laos, before losing to Dietmar Geilich of East Germany.
