= 1975 European Amateur Boxing Championships =

Boxing competitions

- Host city: Katowice
- Country: Poland
- Nations: 23
- Athletes: 193
- Dates: 1–8 June

The 1975 European Amateur Boxing Championships were held in Spodek, Katowice, Poland from 1 to 8 June. The 21st edition of the bi-annual competition was organised by the European governing body for amateur boxing, EABA. There were 193 fighters from 23 countries participating.

== Medal winners ==
Event	Gold	Silver	Bronze
Light Flyweight (– 48 kilograms)	Aleksandr Tkachenko; Soviet Union	Enrique Rodríguez; Spain	György Gedó; Hungary Remus Cosma; Romania
Flyweight (– 51 kilograms)	Vladislav Sasypko; Soviet Union	Constantin Gruiescu; Romania	Sándor Orbán; Hungary Charlie Magri; England
Bantamweight (– 54 kilograms)	Viktor Rybakov; Soviet Union	Tsacho Andreykovski; Bulgaria	Mircea Tone; Romania Milan Piskač; Czechoslovakia
Featherweight (– 57 kilograms)	Tibor Badari; Hungary	(Socialist Federal Republic of Yugoslavia) Bratislav Ristić; Yugoslavia	Antonio Rubio; Spain Patrick Cowdell; England
Lightweight (– 60 kilograms)	Simion Cuţov; Romania	Valery Lvov; Soviet Union	Ryszard Tomczyk; Poland András Botos; Hungary
Light Welterweight (– 63.5 kilograms)	Valery Limasov; Soviet Union	József Nagy; Hungary	Ulrich Beyer; East Germany (Socialist Federal Republic of Yugoslavia) Bajram Hasani; Yugoslavia
Welterweight (– 67 kilograms)	Kalevi Marjamaa; Finland	Victor Zilberman; Romania	Jerzy Rybicki; Poland Ib Bötcher; Denmark
Light Middleweight (– 71 kilograms)	Wiesław Rudkowski; Poland	Viktor Savchenko; Soviet Union	Franz Dorfer; Austria Mihály Rapcsák; Hungary
Middleweight (– 75 kilograms)	Vyacheslav Lemeshev; Soviet Union	Bernd Wittenburg; East Germany	Jacek Kucharczyk; Poland Zdeněk Tykva; Czechoslovakia
Light Heavyweight (– 81 kilograms)	Anatoliy Klimanov; Soviet Union	Georgi Stoymenov; Bulgaria	Ottomar Sachse; East Germany (Socialist Federal Republic of Yugoslavia) Radovan Bisić; Yugoslavia
Heavyweight (+ 81 kilograms)	Andrzej Biegalski; Poland	Viktor Ulyanich; Soviet Union	Mircea Simon; Romania Garfield McEwan; England

== Medal table ==
* Host nation (Poland)

Rank	Nation	Gold	Silver	Bronze	Total
1	Soviet Union (URS)	6	3	0	9
2	Poland (POL)*	2	0	3	5
3	Romania (ROU)	1	2	3	6
4	Hungary (HUN)	1	1	4	6
5	Finland (FIN)	1	0	0	1
6	Bulgaria (BUL)	0	2	0	2
7	East Germany (GDR)	0	1	2	3
7	Yugoslavia (YUG)	0	1	2	3
9	Spain (ESP)	0	1	1	2
10	England (ENG)	0	0	3	3
11	Czechoslovakia (TCH)	0	0	2	2
12	Austria (AUT)	0	0	1	1
12	Denmark (DEN)	0	0	1	1
Totals (13 entries)		11	11	22	44
