= 1977 European Amateur Boxing Championships =

Boxing competitions

- Host city: Halle
- Country: East Germany
- Nations: 23
- Athletes: 146
- Dates: 2–10 May

The 1977 European Amateur Boxing Championships were held in Halle, East Germany from 28 May to 5 June. The 22nd edition of the bi-annual competition was organised by the European governing body for amateur boxing, EABA. There were 146 fighters from 23 countries participating.

== Medal winners ==
| Event | Gold | Silver | Bronze |
|---|---|---|---|
| Light Flyweight (– 48 kilograms) | Henryk Średnicki; Poland | Georgi Georgiev; Bulgaria | Anatoliy Kluyev; Soviet Union (Republic of Ireland) Philip Sutcliffe Snr; Ireland |
| Flyweight (– 51 kilograms) | Leszek Błażyński; Poland | Aleksandr Tkachenko; Soviet Union | Plamen Kamburov; Bulgaria Nuri Eroğlu; Turkey |
| Bantamweight (– 54 kilograms) | Stefan Förster; East Germany | Teodor Dinu; Romania | Manfred König; West Germany Dimitar Pehlivanov; Bulgaria |
| Featherweight (– 57 kilograms) | Richard Nowakowski; East Germany | Roman Gotfryd; Poland | Viktor Rybakov; Soviet Union Titi Tudor; Romania |
| Lightweight (– 60 kilograms) | (Socialist Federal Republic of Yugoslavia) Ace Rusevski; Yugoslavia | Christian Zornow; East Germany | René Weller; West Germany Abdel Kerzazi; France |
| Light Welterweight (– 63.5 kilograms) | Bogdan Gajda; Poland | (West Germany) Ulrich Beyer; East Germany | Calistrat Cuțov; Romania (Socialist Federal Republic of Yugoslavia) Memet Bogujevci; Yugoslavia |
| Welterweight (– 67 kilograms) | Valery Limasov; Soviet Union | Karl-Heinz Krüger; East Germany | Vasile Cicu; Romania Plamen Jankov; Bulgaria |
| Light Middleweight (– 71 kilograms) | Viktor Savchenko; Soviet Union | Markus Intlekofer; West Germany | Jerzy Rybicki; Poland Kalevi Marjamaa; Finland |
| Middleweight (– 75 kilograms) | Leonid Shaposhnikov; Soviet Union | Bernd Wittenburg; East Germany | Ilya Angelov; Bulgaria Svatopluk Žáček; Czechoslovakia |
| Light Heavyweight (– 81 kilograms) | David Kvachadze; Soviet Union | Ottomar Sachse; East Germany | Ion Györfi; Romania Rauno Pellikainen; Finland |
| Heavyweight (+ 81 kilograms) | Evgeny Gorstkov; Soviet Union | Jürgen Fanghänel; East Germany | Mircea Şimon; Romania Atanas Suvandshijev; Bulgaria |

== Medal table ==
* Host nation (East Germany)

| Rank | Nation | Gold | Silver | Bronze | Total |
|---|---|---|---|---|---|
| 1 | Soviet Union (URS) | 5 | 1 | 2 | 8 |
| 2 | Poland (POL) | 3 | 1 | 1 | 5 |
| 3 | East Germany (GDR)* | 2 | 6 | 0 | 8 |
| 4 | Yugoslavia (YUG) | 1 | 0 | 1 | 2 |
| 5 | Bulgaria (BUL) | 0 | 1 | 5 | 6 |
| 5 | Romania (ROU) | 0 | 1 | 5 | 6 |
| 7 | West Germany (FRG) | 0 | 1 | 2 | 3 |
| 8 | Finland (FIN) | 0 | 0 | 2 | 2 |
| 9 | Czechoslovakia (TCH) | 0 | 0 | 1 | 1 |
| 9 | France (FRA) | 0 | 0 | 1 | 1 |
| 9 | Ireland (IRL) | 0 | 0 | 1 | 1 |
| 9 | Turkey (TUR) | 0 | 0 | 1 | 1 |
| Totals (12 entries) | | 11 | 11 | 22 | 44 |
