= Dumitru Șchiopu =

Romanian boxer

Personal information
- Nationality: Romanian
- Born: 20 September 1959 (age 66) Vorniceni, Botoșani, Romania
- Height: 1.60 m (5 ft 3 in)
- Weight: Light flyweight

Boxing career
Medal record
Men's amateur boxing
Representing Romania
Romania National Amateur Boxing Championships
Gold medal – first place	1979 Bucharest	-48 kg
Silver medal – second place	1980 Bucharest	-48 kg
Gold medal – first place	1981 Bucharest	-48 kg
Gold medal – first place	1982 Bucharest	-48 kg
Gold medal – first place	1984 Bucharest	-48 kg
Gold medal – first place	1985 Galați	-48 kg
Silver medal – second place	1986 Constanța	-48 kg
Golden Belt Tournament
Gold medal – first place	1980 Bucharest	-48 kg
Silver medal – second place	1983 Bucharest	-48 kg
Silver medal – second place	1984 Bucharest	-48 kg

Dumitru Șchiopu (born September 20, 1959) is a retired male boxer from Romania, who represented his native country at the 1980 Summer Olympics in Moscow, Soviet Union. There he lost in the quarterfinals of the men's light flyweight (– 48 kg) division to North Korea's eventual bronze medalist Li Byong-Uk. He also won five Romanian National Amateur Boxing Championships and one Golden Belt Tournament which was held in Romania.
