= Gilberto Sosa =

Mexican boxer (born 1960)

Personal information
- Born: 23 September 1960 (age 65) Mexico City, Mexico
- Height: 1.55 m (5.1 ft)
- Weight: 48 kg (106 lb)

Boxing career
Medal record
Men's Boxing
Representing Mexico
Pan American Games
Bronze medal – third place	1979 San Juan	Light Flyweight

Gilberto Sosa (born 23 September 1960 in Mexico City) is a Mexican former boxer who competed in the men's light flyweight division. He represented his native country at the 1979 Pan American Games, where he captured the bronze medal; at the 1979 Latin American Boxing Championship (Campeonato Latinoamericano de Boxeo), where he also won the bronze medal, and at the 1980 Summer Olympics in Moscow.

== 1980 Olympic results ==
Below is the record of Gilberto Sosa, a Mexican light flyweight boxer who competed at the 1980 Moscow Olympics:

- Round of 32: defeated Vanduin Bayasgalan (Mongolia) by decision, 4-1
- Round of 16: lost to Li Byong-uk (North Korea) by decision, 2-3
