= Viktor Savchenko (boxer) =

Soviet boxer

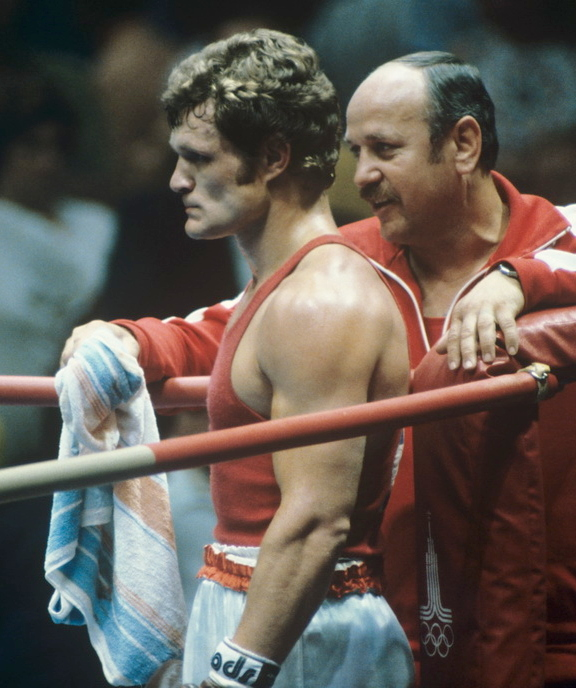
- Savchenko at the 1980 Olympics

Personal information
- Born: 17 September 1952 (age 73) Ataman, Kherson Oblast, Ukrainian SSR, Soviet Union
- Height: 172 cm (5 ft 8 in)

Sport
- Sport: Boxing
- Club: Avangard Dnipropetrovsk
Medal record
Representing the Soviet Union
Olympic Games
Bronze medal – third place	1976 Montreal	-71 kg
Silver medal – second place	1980 Moscow	-75 kg
World championships
Gold medal – first place	1978 Belgrade	-71 kg
European championships
Silver medal – second place	1975 Spodek	-71 kg
Gold medal – first place	1977 Halle	-71 kg
Silver medal – second place	1979 Cologne	-71 kg

Viktor Grigorievich Savchenko (Ukrainian: Віктор Григорович Савченко, born 17 September 1952) is a retired Ukrainian amateur middleweight boxer. He won the European title in 1977, the world title in 1978, and two Olympic medals in 1976 and 1980. Savchenko was the Soviet middleweight champion in 1977 and 1980. He retired in 1982 with a record of 241 wins out of 271 bouts, and the same year graduated from the Dnipropetrovsk State Institute of Physical Culture. He later defended a PhD in pedagogy, and became department head and then rector at the same institute. He also served as a board member of the Ukrainian Boxing Federation and headed the Sports and Physical Culture Committee of Verkhovna Rada.
