= Peter Odhiambo (boxer, born 1958) =

Ugandan boxer

Personal information
- Nationality: Ugandan
- Born: 11 March 1958 (age 67)

Sport
- Sport: Boxing

Peter Odhiambo (born 11 March 1958) is a Ugandan boxer. He competed in the men's middleweight event at the 1980 Summer Olympics.
