= Dietmar Geilich =

East German boxer

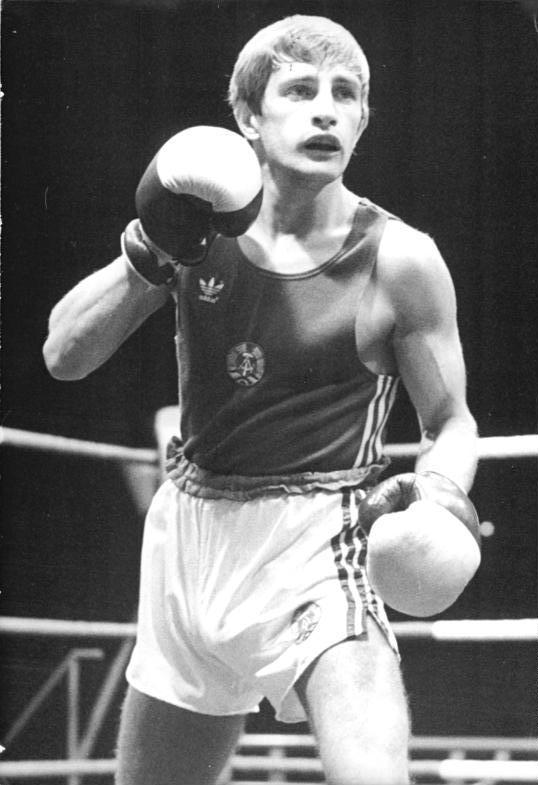
- Dietmar Geilich in 1983

Personal information
- Nationality: East German
- Born: 16 June 1954 (age 72) Görlitz, Saxony, East Germany
- Height: 158 cm (5 ft 2 in)
- Weight: 48 kg (106 lb)

Sport
- Country: GDR
- Sport: Boxing
Medal record
Men's Boxing
Representing East Germany
Friendship Games
Bronze medal – third place	1984 Havana	Light Flyweight
World Amateur Championships
Bronze medal – third place	1982 Munich	Light Flyweight
European Amateur Championships
Silver medal – second place	1979 Cologne	Light Flyweight
Silver medal – second place	1981 Tampere	Light Flyweight

Dietmar Geilich is an East German Olympic boxer. He represented his country in the light-flyweight division at the 1976 Summer Olympics, as well as the 1980 Summer Olympics. He lost his first match against Armando Guevara in 1976. In 1980, he defeated Birender Singh Thapa in his first match, defeated Pedro Manuel Nieves in his second, and then lost to Shamil Sabirov, the eventual gold medalist, in his third bout.
