= Zoffa Yarawi =

Papua New Guinean boxer (born 1954)

Personal information
- Nationality: Papua New Guinean
- Born: 1 January 1954 (age 71)

Sport
- Sport: Boxing

Zoffa Yarawi (born 1 January 1954) is a Papua New Guinean boxer. He competed in the men's light flyweight event at the 1976 Summer Olympics.
