= Ahmed Saïd =

Algerian boxer (born 1953)

Personal information
- Nationality: Algerian
- Born: 1 January 1953 (age 72)

Sport
- Sport: Boxing

Ahmed Saïd (born 1 January 1953) is an Algerian boxer. He competed in the men's light flyweight event at the 1980 Summer Olympics.
