= Bajram Hasani =

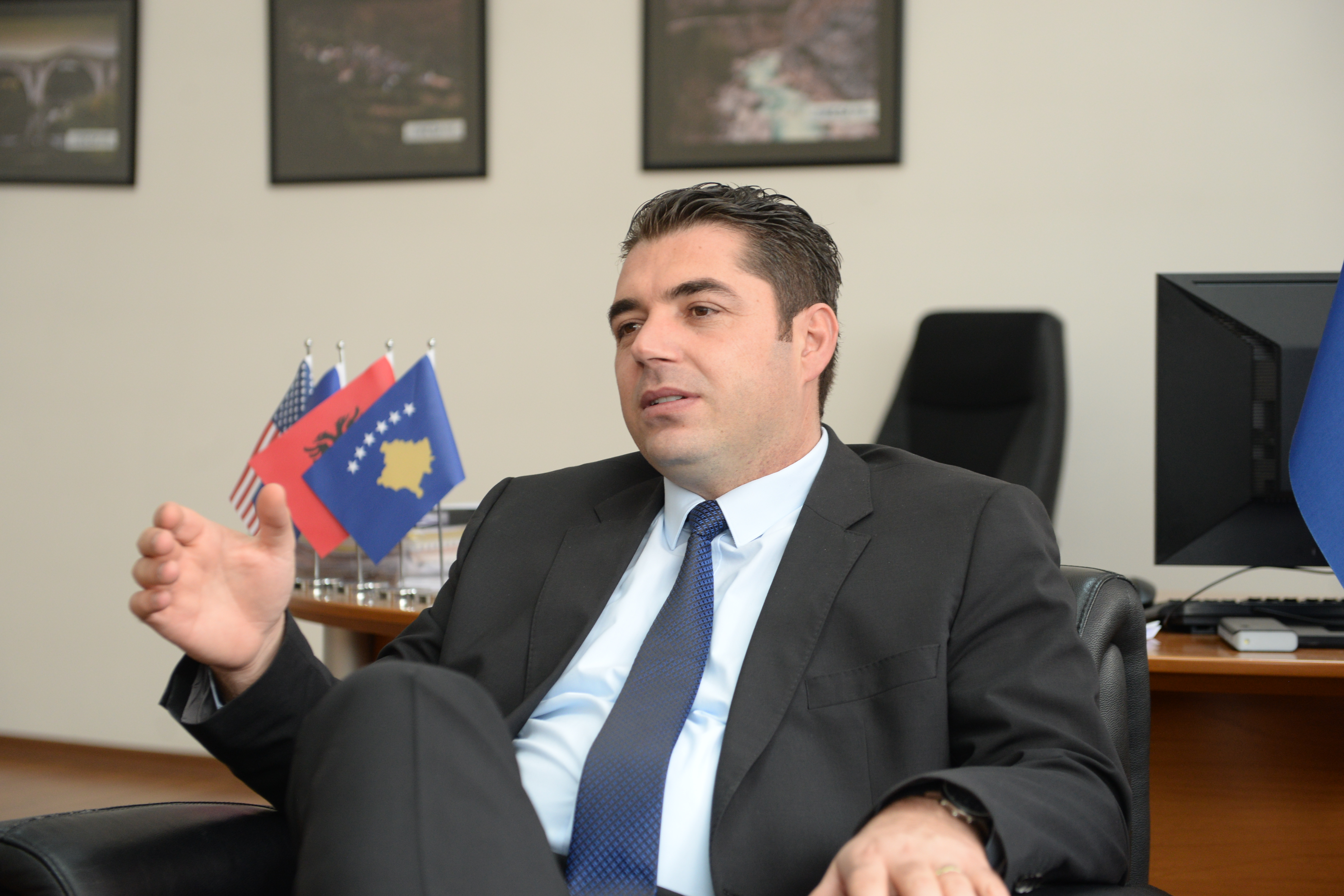

Minister of Trade and Industry

Personal details
- Born: July 15, 1982 (age 42); Gjilan

Bajram Hasani is a politician from Kosovo who was born on July 15, 1982.

== Biography ==
He has a degree in Management and Informatics at the University of Pristina School of Economics and went to the University of Tirana for graduate studies in marketing. He also earned a Master's degree in Management at the State University of Tetova in North Macedonia.

In September 2017, he became the Minister of Trade and Industry of Kosovo.

His management experiences prior to holding office include the positions of corporate manager, credit analyst and risk coordinator at NLB Group's Pristina office, which he held consecutively from 2005 to 2013. He also invested in the Gjilan-based developer City Projects SH.P.K.

He served a term on the Gjilan Municipal Council. In addition, he served as local branch chair and national presidency member of the political party NISMA (Social Democratic Initiative).

He lives in Gjilan with his wife and four children.

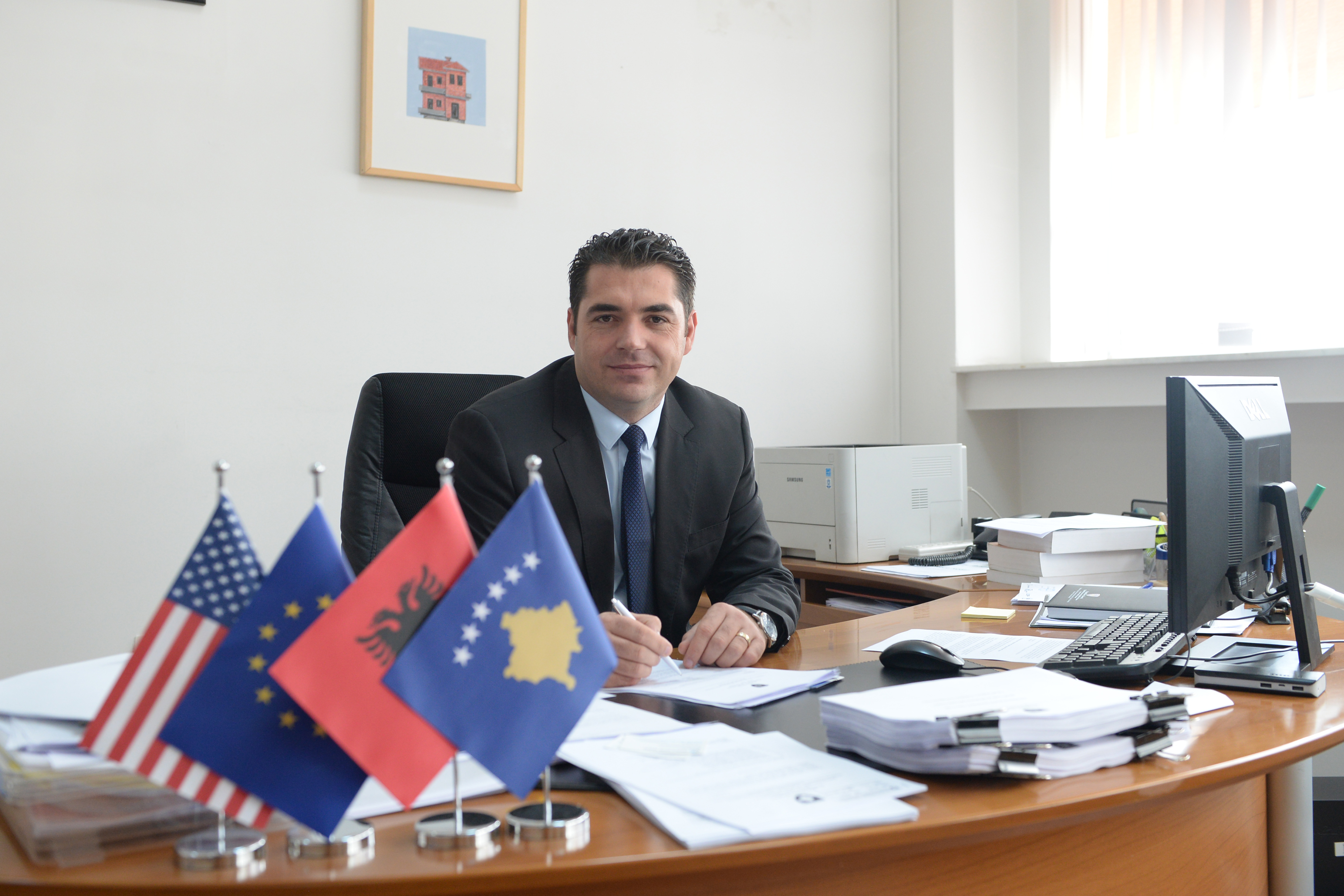
In his office as Minister
