= Jang Bong-mun =

North Korean boxer (born 1954)

Personal information
- Nationality: North Korean
- Born: 25 August 1954 (age 71)

Sport
- Sport: Boxing

- Jang Bong-mun
- Hangul: 장봉문
- RR: Jang Bongmun
- MR: Chang Pongmun

Jang Bong-mun (Korean: 장봉문, born 25 August 1954) is a North Korean boxer. He competed in the men's middleweight event at the 1980 Summer Olympics.
