= Remus Cosma =

Romanian boxer

Remus Cozma
Personal information
- Nationality: Romanian
- Born: 12 November 1952 (age 73) Romania
- Height: 155 cm (5 ft 1 in)
- Weight: 48 kg (106 lb)

Sport
- Country: Romania
- Sport: Boxing
Medal record
Representing Romania
Romania National Amateur Boxing Championships
Silver medal – second place	1972 Bucharest	Light flyweight
Gold medal – first place	1977 Bucharest	Light flyweight
European Amateur Championships
Bronze medal – third place	1975 Katowice	Light flyweight

Remus Cozma (born 12 November 1952) is a Romanian Olympic boxer. He represented his country in the light-flyweight division at the 1976 Summer Olympics. He lost his first match against Payao Poontarat. He also won one national senior title and one bronze medal at the European Amateur Boxing Championships.
