= Manfred Trauten =

German boxer

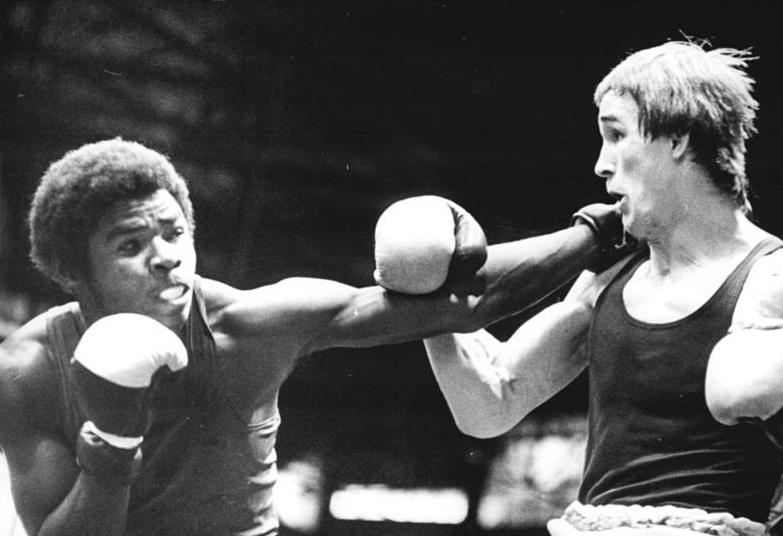
- Manfred Trauten (right) fighting Cuba's Bernardo Comas

Personal information
- Nationality: German
- Born: 5 July 1958 (age 66); Schönebeck, East Germany

Sport
- Sport: Boxing

Manfred Trauten (born 5 July 1958) is a German boxer. He competed in the men's middleweight event at the 1980 Summer Olympics.
