= 1979 European Amateur Boxing Championships =

Boxing competitions

- Host city: Cologne
- Country: West Germany
- Nations: 22
- Athletes: 171
- Dates: 2–10 May

The Men's 1979 European Amateur Boxing Championships were held in Cologne, West Germany from May 5 to May 12, 1979. The 23rd edition of the bi-annual competition was organised by the European governing body for amateur boxing, EABA. There were 146 fighters from across many European countries participated in the competition.

The Heavyweight (– 91 kilograms) and Super Heavyweight (+ 91 kilograms) categories were contested for the first time.

== Medal winners ==
Event	Gold	Silver	Bronze
Light Flyweight (– 48 kilograms)	Shamil Sabirov; Soviet Union	Dietmar Geilich; East Germany	András Rózsa; Hungary Georgi Georgiev; Bulgaria
Flyweight (– 51 kilograms)	Henryk Średnicki; Poland	Daniel Radu; Romania	Alexandr Dugarov; Soviet Union Frank Kegebein; East Germany
Bantamweight (– 54 kilograms)	Nikolay Khraptsov; Soviet Union	Dimitar Pekhlivanov; Bulgaria	Georg Vlachos; West Germany (Republic of Ireland) Philip Sutcliffe Snr; Ireland
Featherweight (– 57 kilograms)	Viktor Rybakov; Soviet Union	Chacho Andreykovski; Bulgaria	Kazimierz Przybylski; Poland Carlo Russolillo; Italy
Lightweight (– 60 kilograms)	Viktor Demyanenko; Soviet Union	Rene Weller; West Germany	Ilie Dragomir; Romania Richard Nowakowski; East Germany
Light Welterweight (– 63.5 kilograms)	Serik Konakbayev; Soviet Union	Patrizio Oliva; Italy	Caroly Hajnal; Romania Karl-Heinz Krueger; East Germany
Welterweight (– 67 kilograms)	Ernst Müller; West Germany	(Socialist Federal Republic of Yugoslavia) Sreten Mirković; Yugoslavia	Ion Budusan; Romania Kalevi Kosunen; Finland
Light Middleweight (– 71 kilograms)	(Socialist Federal Republic of Yugoslavia) Miodrag Perunović; Yugoslavia	Viktor Savchenko; Soviet Union	(Czech Republic) Rostislav Osička; Czechoslovakia Markus Intlekofer; West Germany
Middleweight (– 75 kilograms)	Tarmo Uusivirta; Finland	Valentin Silaghi; Romania	Manfred Gebauer; East Germany Laszlo Pem; Hungary
Light Heavyweight (– 81 kilograms)	Albert Nikolyan; Soviet Union	(Socialist Federal Republic of Yugoslavia) Tadija Kačar; Yugoslavia	Paweł Skrzecz; Poland Giorgica Donici; Romania
Heavyweight (– 91 kilograms)	Evgeny Gorstkov; Soviet Union	Werner Kohnert; East Germany	Roger Andersson; Sweden Ion Cernat; Romania
Super Heavyweight (+ 91 kilograms)	Peter Hussing; West Germany	Ferenc Somodi; Hungary	Jürgen Fanghänel; East Germany Khoren Indzheyan; Soviet Union

== Medal table ==
Rank	Nation	Gold	Silver	Bronze	Total
1	Soviet Union (URS)	7	1	2	10
2	West Germany (FRG)	2	1	2	5
3	SFR Yugoslavia	1	2	0	3
4	Poland (POL)	1	0	2	3
5	Finland (FIN)	1	0	1	2
6	East Germany (GDR)	0	2	5	7
6	Romania (ROU)	0	2	5	7
8	Bulgaria (BUL)	0	2	1	3
9	Hungary (HUN)	0	1	2	3
10	Italy (ITA)	0	1	1	2
11	Czechoslovakia (TCH)	0	0	1	1
11	Ireland (IRL)	0	0	1	1
11	Sweden (SWE)	0	0	1	1
Totals (13 entries)		12	12	24	48
