= Mohamed Said Abdel Wehab =

Egyptian boxer

Personal information
- Nationality: Egyptian
- Born: 12 January 1954 (age 71)
- Height: 1.57 m (5 ft 2 in)
- Weight: 48 kg (106 lb)

Sport
- Sport: Boxing

Mohamed Said Abdel Wehab (born 12 January 1954) is an Egyptian boxer. He competed in the 1976 Summer Olympics.
