= Plaza Monumental de Toros de Pueblo Nuevo =

Bullring in San Cristóbal, Venezuela

Coordinates: 7.787853°N 72.201741°W

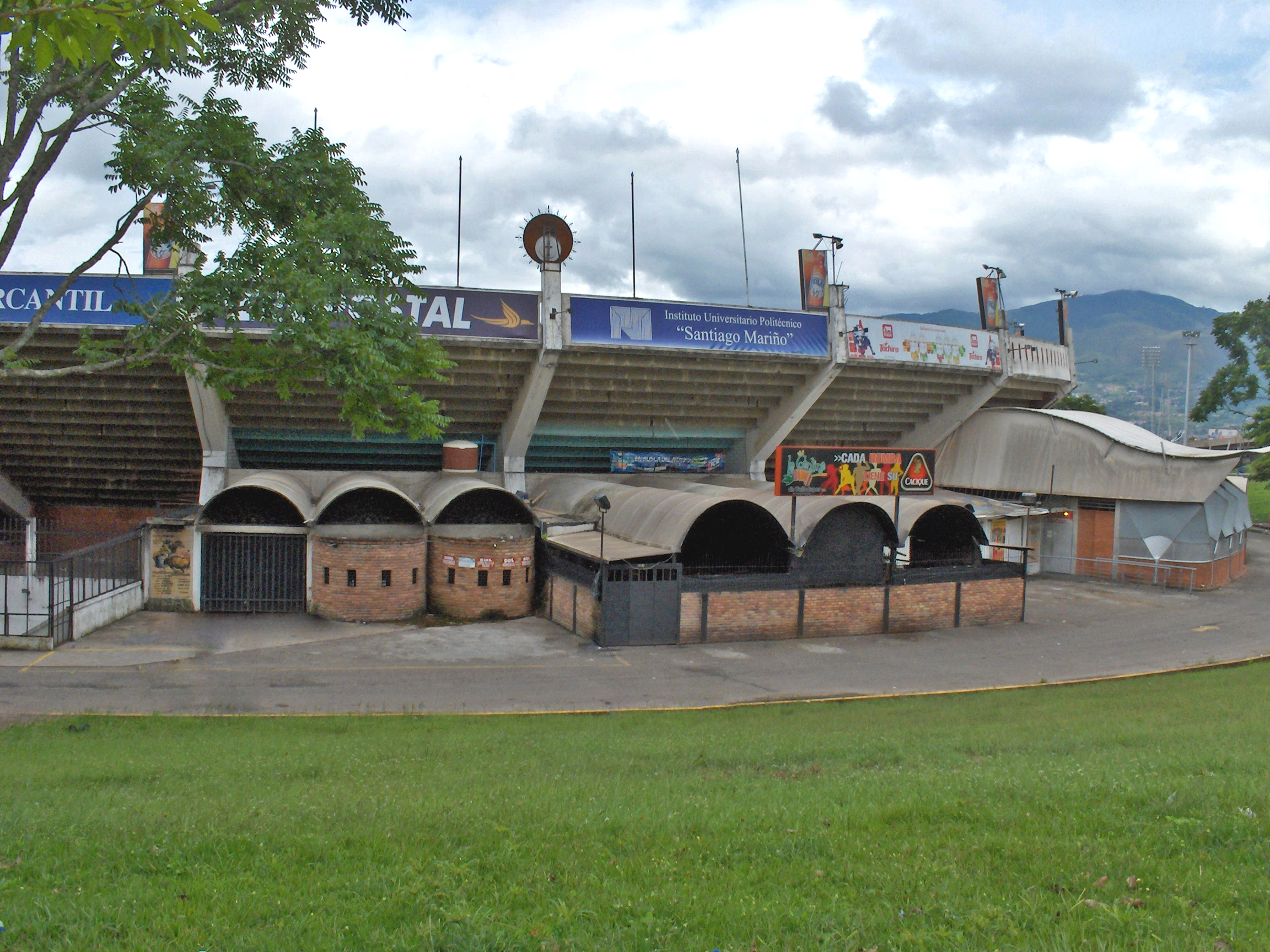
View of the Plaza Monumental

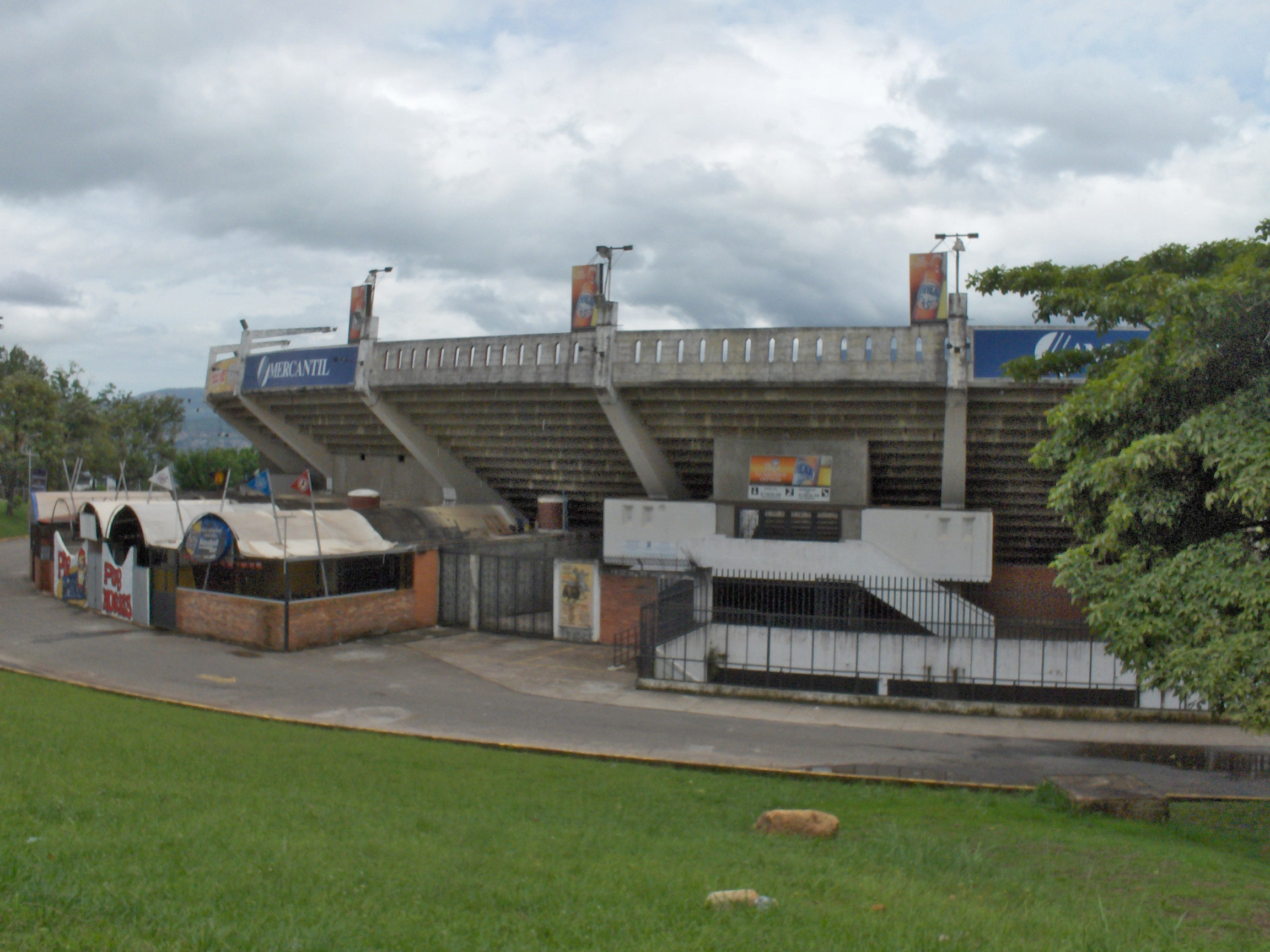
Northeast side

Plaza Monumental de toros de Pueblo Nuevo is a Bullring in San Cristóbal, Venezuela, currently used for bullfighting. The stadium can hold up to 15,000 people and was built in 1967.

== History ==
Eduardo Santos Castillo was the architect in charge of the structure's design and has participated, since the arena opening, in all the remodelings and improvements. It was inaugurated on January 17 of 1967.

In the inaugural bullfight it counted on the cattle ranches of Piedrahíta and Dosgutiérrez, for the bullfighters Antonio Chenel "Antoñete", Curro Girón, Paco Camino and El Pireo.

An improvement in the seating was implemented in 1997, reducing its capacity to 15,000 people. This enclosure is now used for multiple entertainment events for the city, being one of its main places of interest.
