= Aleksandr Tkachenko (boxer) =

Soviet boxer

Personal information
- Nationality: Soviet
- Born: 14 November 1955 (age 70) Stalino, Ukrainian SSR, USSR
- Height: 164 cm (5 ft 5 in)
- Weight: 48 kg (106 lb)

Sport
- Country: Soviet Union
- Sport: Boxing
Medal record
Men's Boxing
Representing Soviet Union
European Amateur Championships
Gold medal – first place	1975 Katowice	Light Flyweight
Silver medal – second place	1977 Halle	Flyweight

Aleksandr Tkachenko (born 14 November 1955) is a Soviet Olympic boxer. He represented his country in the light-flyweight division at the 1976 Summer Olympics. He won his first match against Eleoncio Mercedes. He lost his second match against Payao Poontarat.
