= Beykhan Fuchedzhiev =

Bulgarian boxer

Personal information
- Nationality: Bulgarian
- Born: 1 November 1955 (age 69)

Sport
- Sport: Boxing

Beykhan Fuchedzhiev (born 1 November 1955) is a Bulgarian boxer. He competed in the men's light flyweight event at the 1976 Summer Olympics.
