= Noboru Uchiyama =

Japanese boxer

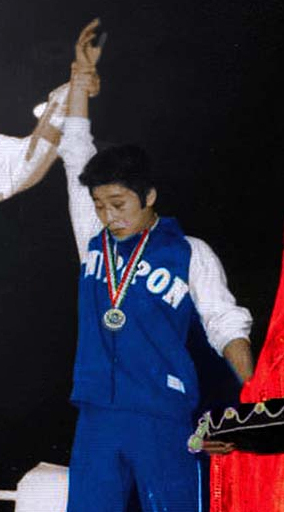
- Uchiyama at the 1974 Asian Games

Personal information
- Born: April 20, 1954 (age 72) Kanoya, Kagoshima, Japan
- Height: 160 cm (5 ft 3 in)

Sport
- Sport: Boxing
Medal record
Representing Japan
Asian Games
| Bronze medal – third place | 1974 Tehran | -48 kg |

Noboru Uchiyama (内山 昇, Uchiyama Noboru; born April 20, 1954) is a retired Japanese amateur boxer. He won a bronze medal at the 1974 Asian Games and competed at the 1976 Olympics, where he was eliminated in the first bout.

== 1976 Olympic results ==
Below is the record of Noboru Uchiyama, a Japanese light flyweight boxer who competed at the 1976 Montreal Olympics:

- Round of 32: lost to Brendan Dunne (Ireland) referee stopped contest in the second round
