= Beruk Asfaw =

Ethiopian boxer (born 1960)

Beruk Asfaw (born 5 June 1960) is a retired male boxer from Ethiopia. He represented his native country at the 1980 Summer Olympics in Moscow, Soviet Union in the light flyweight division. There he lost to Antti Juntumaa of Finland (– 48 kg) after 66 seconds of the first round.

== 1980 Olympic record ==
- Round of 16: lost to Antti Juntumaa (Finland) by second-round knockout
