= Shamil Sabirov =

Russian boxer

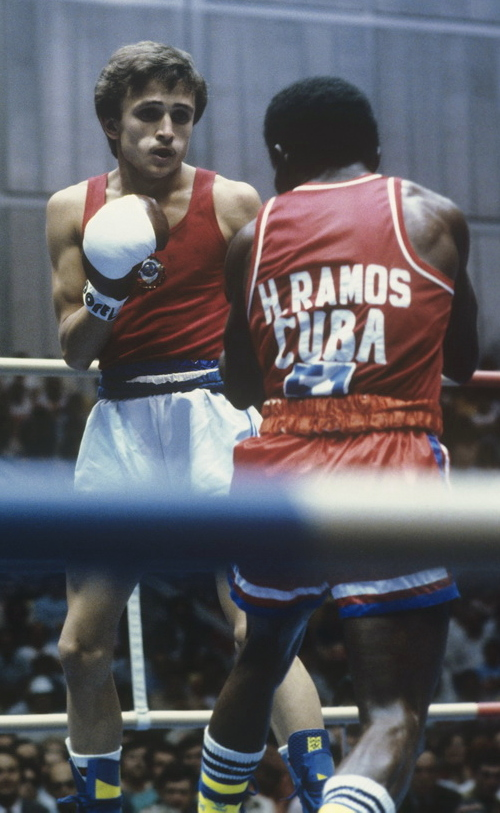
- Sabirov (left) at the 1980 Olympics

Personal information
- Born: 4 April 1959 (age 67) Karpinsk, Russian SFSR, Soviet Union
- Height: 161 cm (5 ft 3 in)

Sport
- Sport: Boxing
- Club: Trud
Medal record
Representing the Soviet Union
Olympic Games
Gold medal – first place	1980 Moscow	-48 kg
European Amateur Championships
Gold medal – first place	1979 Cologne	-48 kg
Bronze medal – third place	1981 Tampere	-48 kg

Shamil Altaevich Sabirov (Russian: Шамиль Алтаевич Сабиров; born 4 April 1959) is a retired Russian light-flyweight boxer. He won gold medals at the 1979 European Championships and 1980 Olympics, becoming the only boxing champion from the Soviet Union at the Moscow Olympics.

Sabirov took up boxing in 1973 and retired in 1985 with a record of 160 wins in 180 bouts. He graduated from an institute of physical education and holds a PhD in pedagogy. After retiring from competitions he mostly worked as a boxing coach and referee. In 2006 he started a career in politics as a member of the Russian party Rodina.

== 1980 Olympic record ==
Below are the results of Shamil Sabirov, a light flyweight boxer from the Soviet union, who competed at the 1980 Moscow Olympics:

- Round of 32: bye
- Round of 16: defeated Joao Manuel Miguel (Portugal) on points, 5–0
- Quarterfinal: defeated Dietmer Geilich (East Germany) on points, 4–1
- Semifinal: defeated Li Byong-Uk (North Korea) on points, 5–0
- Final: defeated Hipolito Ramos (Cuba) on points, 3–2 (won gold medal)
