= Henryk Średnicki =

Polish boxer

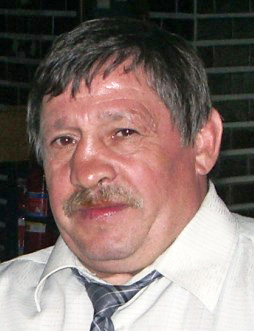

Personal information
- Full name: Henryk Średnicki
- Born: 17 January 1955 Siemianowice Śląskie, Stalinogród Voivodeship, Polish People's Republic
- Died: 10 April 2016 (aged 61) Piotrków Trybunalski, Łódź Voivodeship, Third Polish Republic
- Height: 1.60 m (5 ft 3 in)
- Weight: 51 kg (112 lb)

Sport
- Sport: Boxing
- Weight class: Flyweight
- Club: GKS Tychy/GKS Jastrzębie
Medal record
World Amateur Championships
Gold medal – first place	1978 Belgrade	Flyweight
European Amateur Championships
Gold medal – first place	1977 Halle	Light Flyweight
Gold medal – first place	1979 Cologne	Flyweight

Henryk Średnicki (17 January 1955, Siemianowice Śląskie, Poland – 10 April 2016, Piotrków Trybunalski, Poland) was a Polish amateur boxer who represented his native country twice at the Summer Olympics, starting in 1976.

Średnicki was best known for winning the world title at the second World Amateur Boxing Championships in 1978, beating Cuba's Héctor Ramírez in the final.

== Biography ==
=== Sports career ===
He was one of the most outstanding boxers in the second half of the 1970s. As the only Pole so far, he has won a gold medal at the world championships. He did it in 1978, during the II World Championships in Belgrade in flyweight, after winning four fights. He also competed in the 1st Havana Championship in 1974 in paper weighting, but without success.

He was twice the champion of Europe. At his first European championship, in Katowice in 1975, he was eliminated in the quarter-finals in paper weighting, in two more: in Halle in 1977 in paper weighting and in Cologne in 1979, he won gold medals in flyweight.

He has competed in the Olympic Games twice. In Montreal in 1976 he fought in paper weight, but was eliminated in the qualifying round. He reached the flyweight quarter-finals in Moscow in 1980.

Srednicki was the Polish champion six times: in paper scales in 1974, 1975 and 1976, in flyweights in 1978 and 1979 and in bantamweight in 1982. In 1977 he was runner-up in flyweight.

He won the Tournament three times. Feliks Stamm, in 1977 and 1978 in flyweights, and in 1982 in bantamweight.

He fought for GKS Katowice, GKS Tychy, GKS Jastrzębie and Górnik Sosnowiec. He was a fighter who preferred constant attack, showering his opponent with blows. After ending his career, he became a coach, he led boxing school in Myszków. His pupil was the leading Polish boxer Łukasz Maszczyk.
