= Balta =

Balta may refer to:

== People ==
- Balta (footballer) (born 1962), Spanish footballer and manager
- Balta (surname)

== Places ==
- Balta (crater), on Mars
- Balta, Mehedinți, Romania
- Bâlta, a village in Filiași, Dolj County, Romania
- Bâlta, a village in Runcu, Gorj, Romania
- Balta, Russia, the name of several rural localities in Russia
- Balta, Ukraine, Ukraine
- Balta, Shetland, an island in Scotland
- Balta Sound on the island of Unst in the Shetland Islands, Scotland
- Balta, a small town and its delegation Balta Bou-Alouane in Tunisia
- Balta, North Dakota, US

== Rivers ==
- Bâlta (river), a tributary of the Bistrița in Gorj County, Romania
- Balta (Târnava Mică), a tributary of the Târnava Mică in Sibiu and Alba Counties, Romania
- Balta (Topolnița), a tributary of the Topolnița in Mehedinți County, Romania

== Other ==
- Balta (cockroach), a genus of cockroach

== See also ==
- Balta Albă (disambiguation)
- Balta Verde (disambiguation)
- Balti (disambiguation)
