= Wayside crosses in Romania =

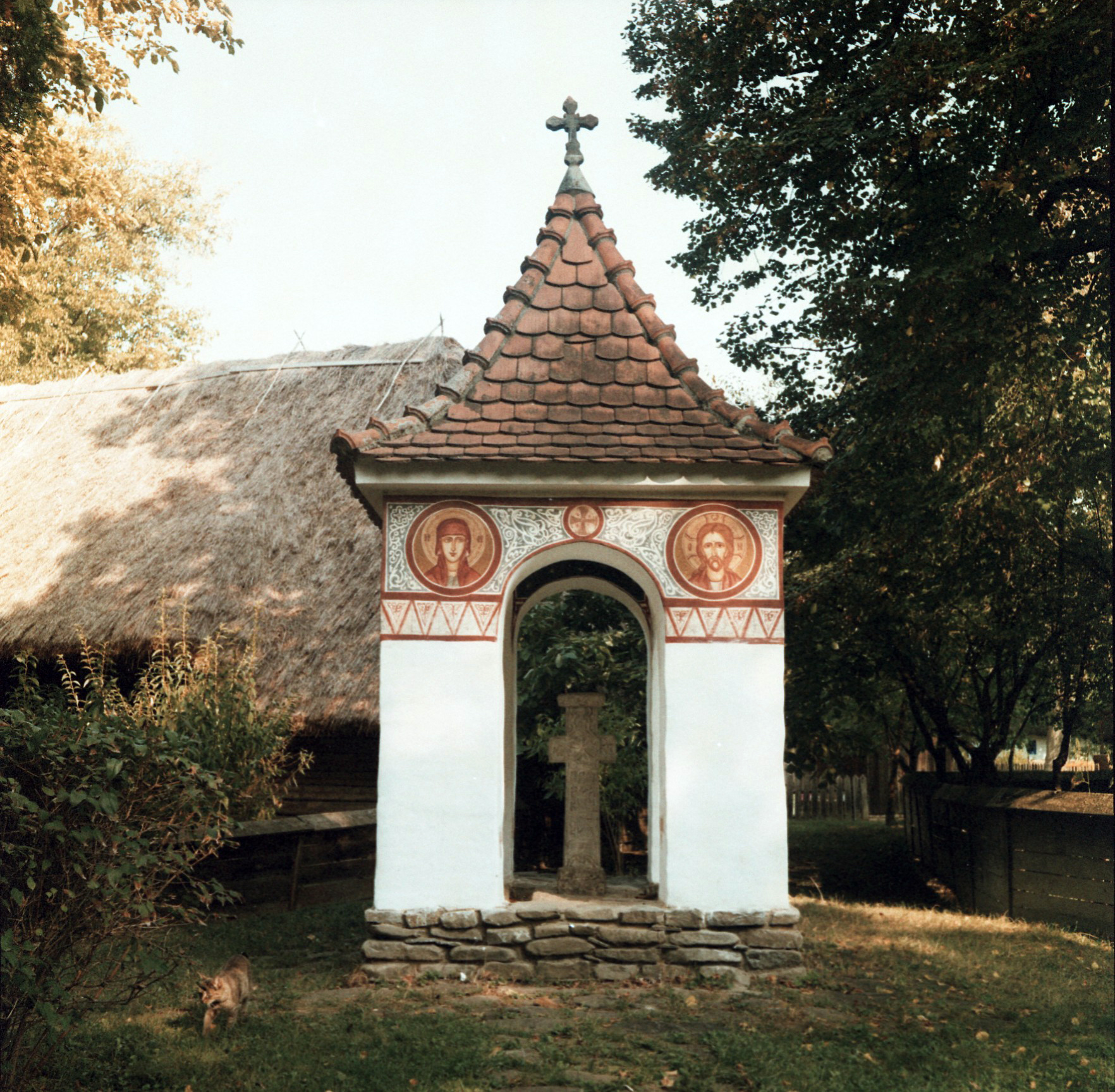
Wayside cross from Rășinari, exhibited at the Dimitrie Gusti National Village Museum

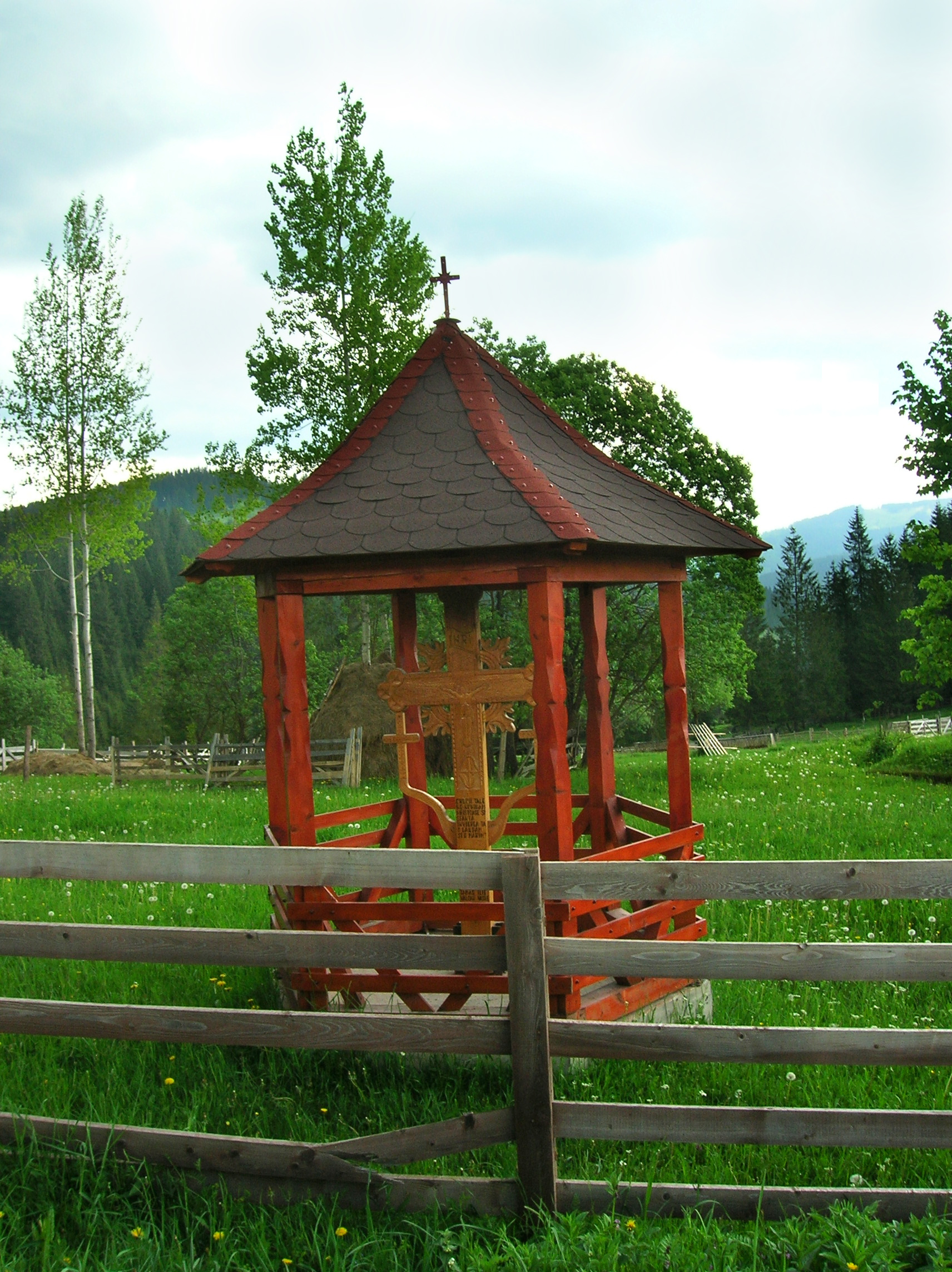
Cross on the Toplița–Bilbor road

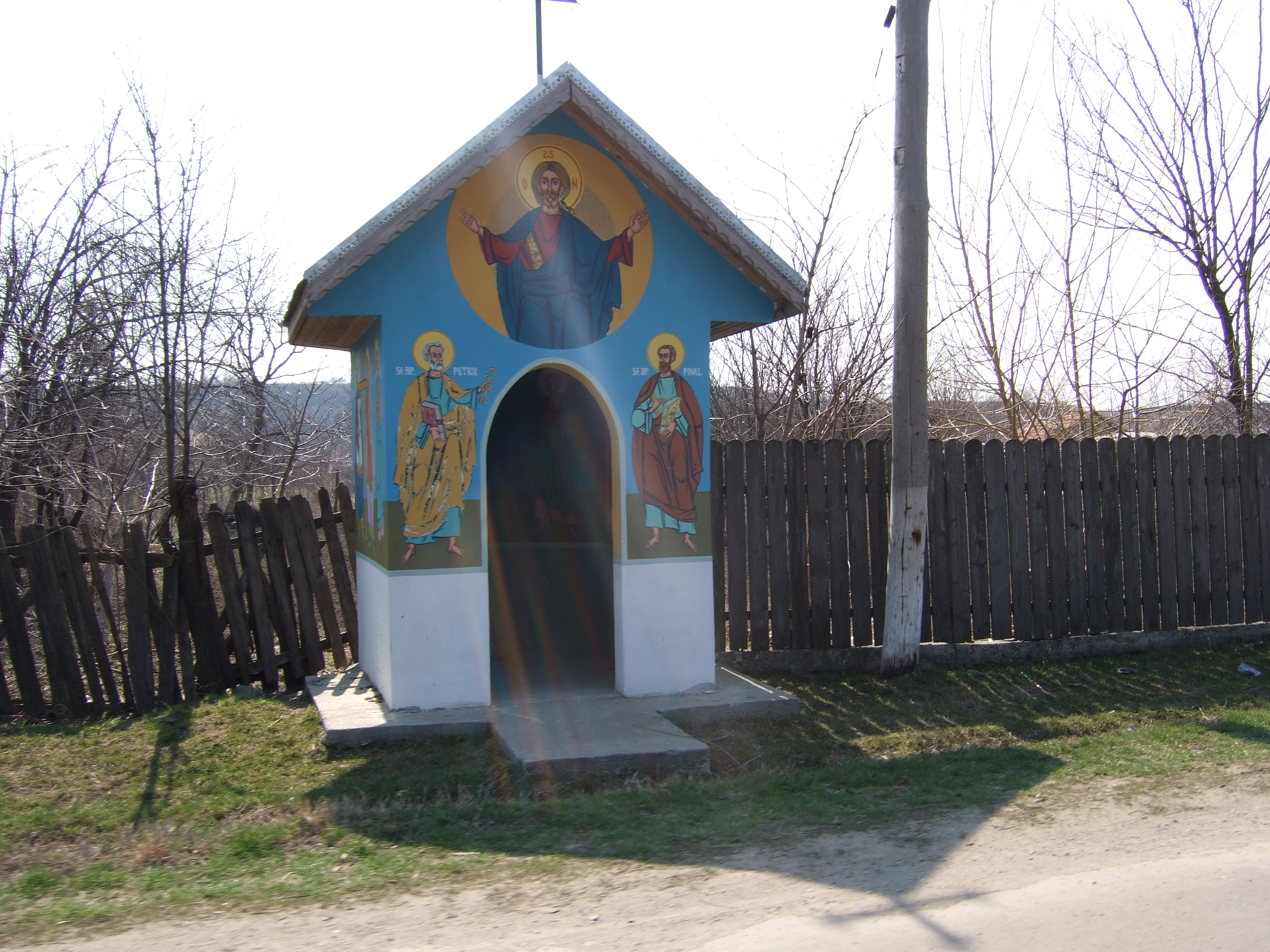
Cross shelter in Bărcănești

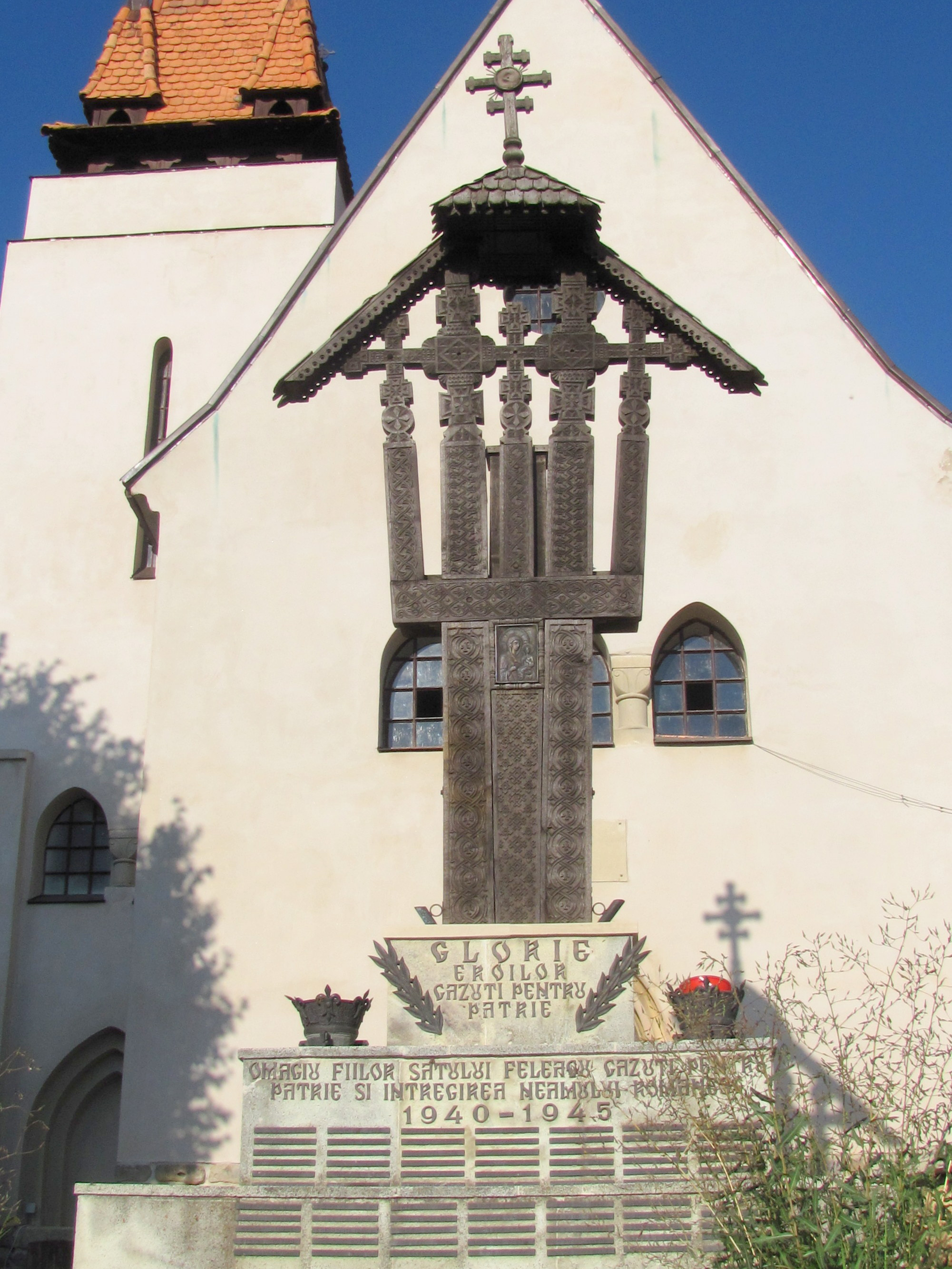
World War II memorial cross in Feleacu

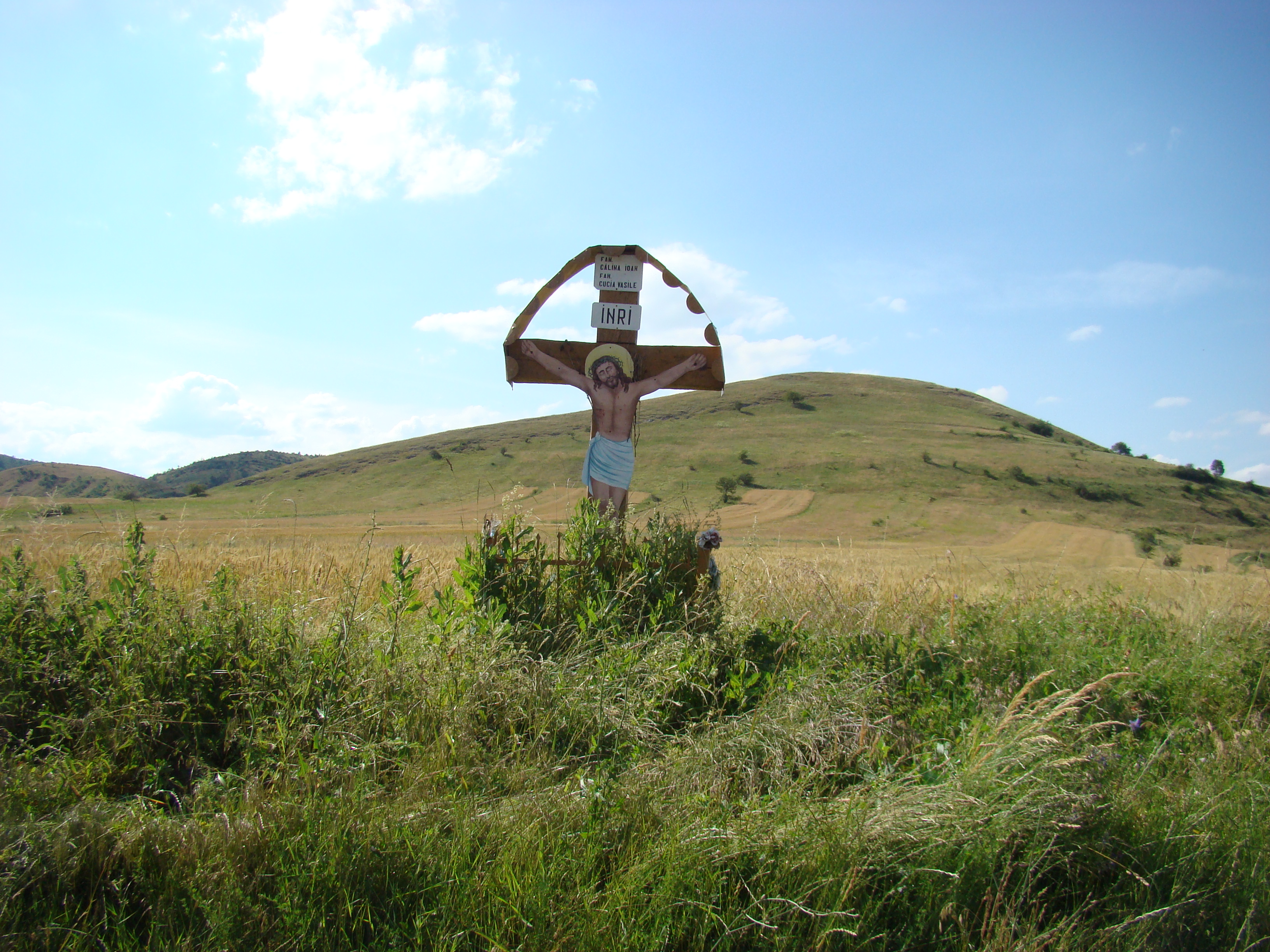
Field boundary cross in Petreștii de Sus

Wayside crosses in Romania are a cultural and religious phenomenon.

== Terminology and description ==
The standard term for the crosses is troiță (pl. troițe); they are also called cruci la răscruci ("crossroads crosses", the northern part of Western Moldavia), răstigniri ("crucifixions", Maramureș), icoane ("icons", Vâlcea County), rugi ("stakes", Ținutul Pădurenilor, Hunedoara County), cruci ("crosses", Transylvania and Oltenia), lemne ("wood beams", in old documents). Troiță is a word of Slavic origin, signifying three joined crosses, associated with the Holy Trinity.

The crosses are a feature of the village landscape, where they were built for divine protection in places thought dangerous. They were meant to preserve the natural order; merely looking at one would confirm the presence of God. The cross is usually made of hardwood, painted on one or both sides. More rarely, they are carved with solar motifs. Some are made of stone or metal. With time and technological advance, simple designs gave way to complex elements.

== Symbolic considerations ==
The crosses recall a pre-Christian time when people would set up ritual columns or altars in places where the cosmic peace was disturbed by evil spirits, hoping to restore order. Crossroads have also been ascribed mystical powers since antiquity; their mythological significance acquired a religious one with the adoption of Christianity, given their cross shape. Columns and poles gave way to crosses, so that the troiță represents “an ad hoc synthesis between the ancient and Christian strata”.

According to Romulus Vulcănescu, the troiță is "the most primitive extant form of religious sanctuary and sacred popular worship". He defines a sanctuary as a place proclaimed holy and respected as such by the people, out of magical, mythical or religious motives. These objects are found in the village center, at the village entrance and exit, at crossroads, unclean places, hillocks and, generally speaking, where the physical and spiritual worlds merge.

Often, the crosses are surrounded by a shelter, with a door towards the road and windows at the sides. Travelers hit by rainstorms can wait inside. In the past, where the water source was farther away, villagers would leave a pitcher of fresh water for passersby. Shelters are rarer in hay and mountain areas; the crosses there are usually covered by tile roofs. The shelters, which form a sort of chapel, are usually painted on the exterior and interior. Christ Pantocrator or the Trinity is on the ceiling, flanked by the Four Evangelists, angels or prophets. Saints and angels are found lower down, with empty spaces filled by grape leaves, ears of wheat, floral or geometric patterns. The exterior might feature medallions of saints or Biblical scenes. Inscriptions appear painted on the inside or carved into the cross.

The magic associations of water means that crosses are found near streams, bridges and wells, superstition holding that well bottoms can hold evil forces. The troiță, pointing heavenward, guards against the dark forces in the depths of the earth. Crosses at village entrances served to guard the locals from plagues and enemies, and were also landmarks. Homeowners would raise crosses in front of their dwellings, seeking spiritual protection. Cemetery troițe do not commemorate the dead, instead watching the boundary between living and dead, amplifying the power of the cross symbol. Finally, a troiță can be a cenotaph, celebrating war heroes whose bodies have not been found, or other dead buried elsewhere.

== World War I crosses ==
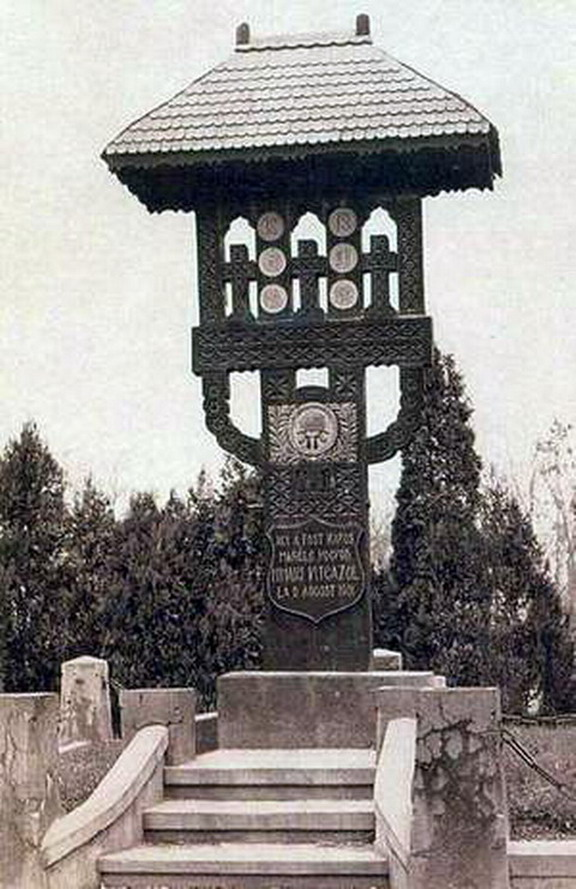
Cross on the grave of Michael the Brave in Turda (1926); replaced by an obelisk and displayed at the local history museum since 1977

A particular type of troiță proliferated in interwar Greater Romania: that dedicated to the fallen soldiers of World War I, and promoted by the Cultul Eroilor memorial society. With the majority of soldiers coming from rural areas, it was considered an appropriate way to commemorate the peasant-soldier hero. In 1921, Gala Galaction wrote of the crosses’ aptness for marking scattered graves “which will never be able to be gathered together”. Another writer likened them to “beings kneeling in prayer”, protecting “this sacred land hallowed by the most precious Romanian blood and bodies”.

The designers sought to integrate the crosses into their surroundings, as was the case with the ones set up in the military cemeteries near Curtea de Argeș Monastery and in Sinaia. By 1931, a number had been erected in small, new military cemeteries. Additionally, as noted in a 1926 article, troițe were placed on the battlefields where troops had died. At times, proposed crosses drew objections from local authorities. For example, at Odorhei in 1934, local politicians argued that placing a donated troiță in the city center would damage its aesthetics; it was instead relegated to the yard of the Gendarmerie school.

A number of troițe were dedicated to historical figures during the period. In 1925, one recalling Michael the Brave was unveiled on the site of the Battle of Șelimbăr near Sibiu; a lavish ceremony was organized by ASTRA and led by Nicolae Bălan. From the following year, another cross marked his grave at Turda. Others so honored include Tudor Vladimirescu (Bucharest), Ilie Măcelar (Sibiu) and Aurel Vlaicu (Bănești, Prahova, near the site of his airplane crash). In 1934, Cultul Eroilor donated a concrete cross to Cercetașii României, unveiled during their jamboree at Mamaia in the presence of King Carol II. Throughout the 1920s and ‘30s, the society sent oak and concrete crosses to places around Romania, making efforts to include communities that struggled financially. Thus, alongside the standard monument, the troiță became an accepted way to honor the war dead.

== Historiography ==
The troiță has been a subject of academic study since the early 20th century. Tudor Pamfile included drawings of the crosses in a 1910 work. Nicolae Iorga considered them as "cheap establishments of believers who lacked the means to show their faith by raising churches"; he added, "at their origins, they were, I believe, something else". They also preoccupied Alexandru Tzigara-Samurcaș (1909, 1928), Grigore Ionescu, Tache Papahagi, and particularly George Oprescu, who called them "curious and impressive expressions of faith" that also satisfied "the remaining pagan superstition" left in the collective consciousness.

It was Vulcănescu who undertook the most thorough research into the phenomenon. His 1947 study Funcțiunea magică a troiței remains a standard reference. In 1972, he substantially expanded his findings in Coloana cerului. In 2003, Ionel Oprișan published Troițe Românești. O tipologie. There, he proposed a classification drawing on Vulcănescu: sacred pre-Christian monuments (heavenly columns and poles), sacred Christian monuments (cross-shaped, icon-bearing and boundary troițe. Further research continued into the 21st century, with a particular focus on Mărginimea Sibiului.

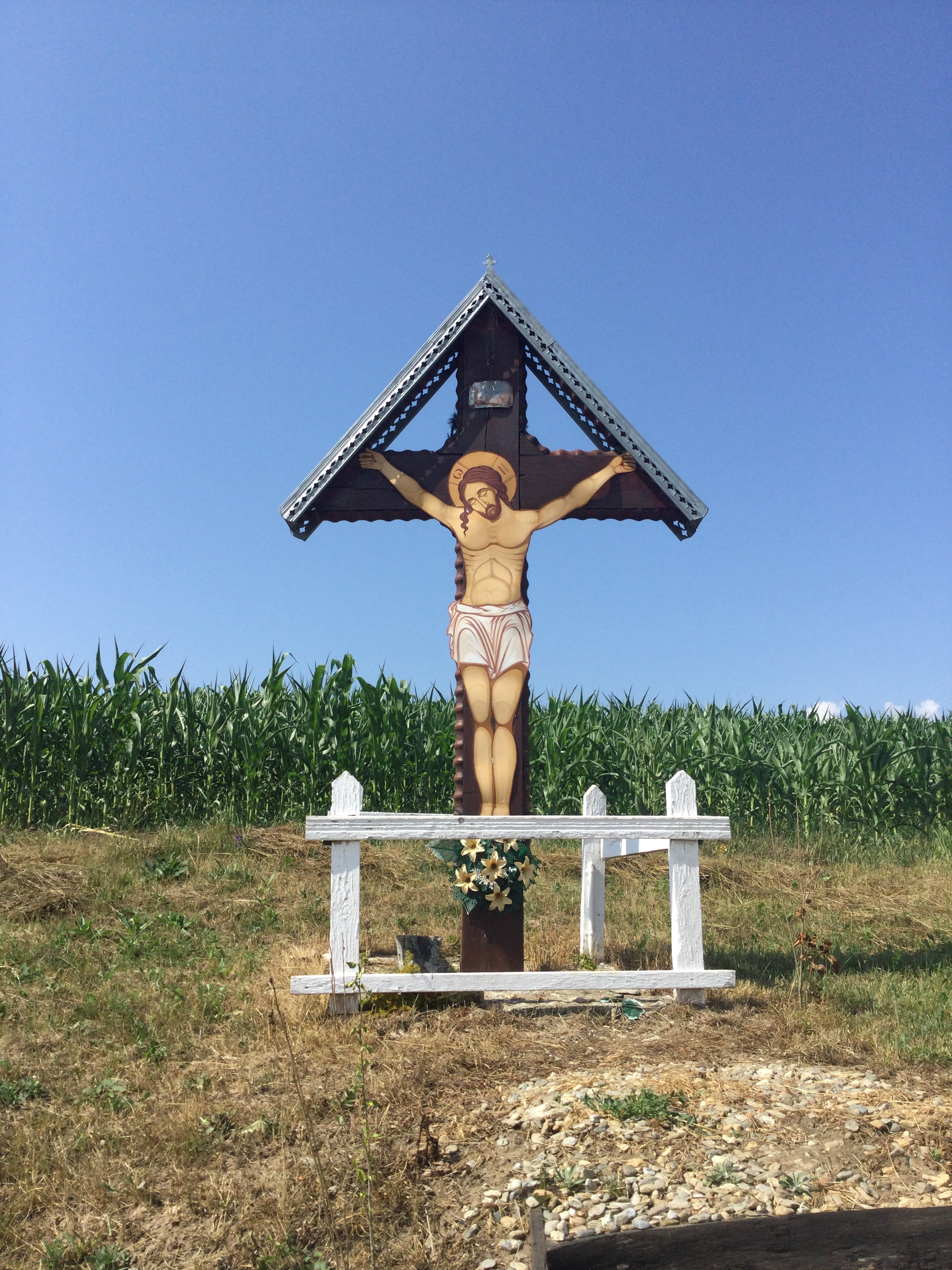
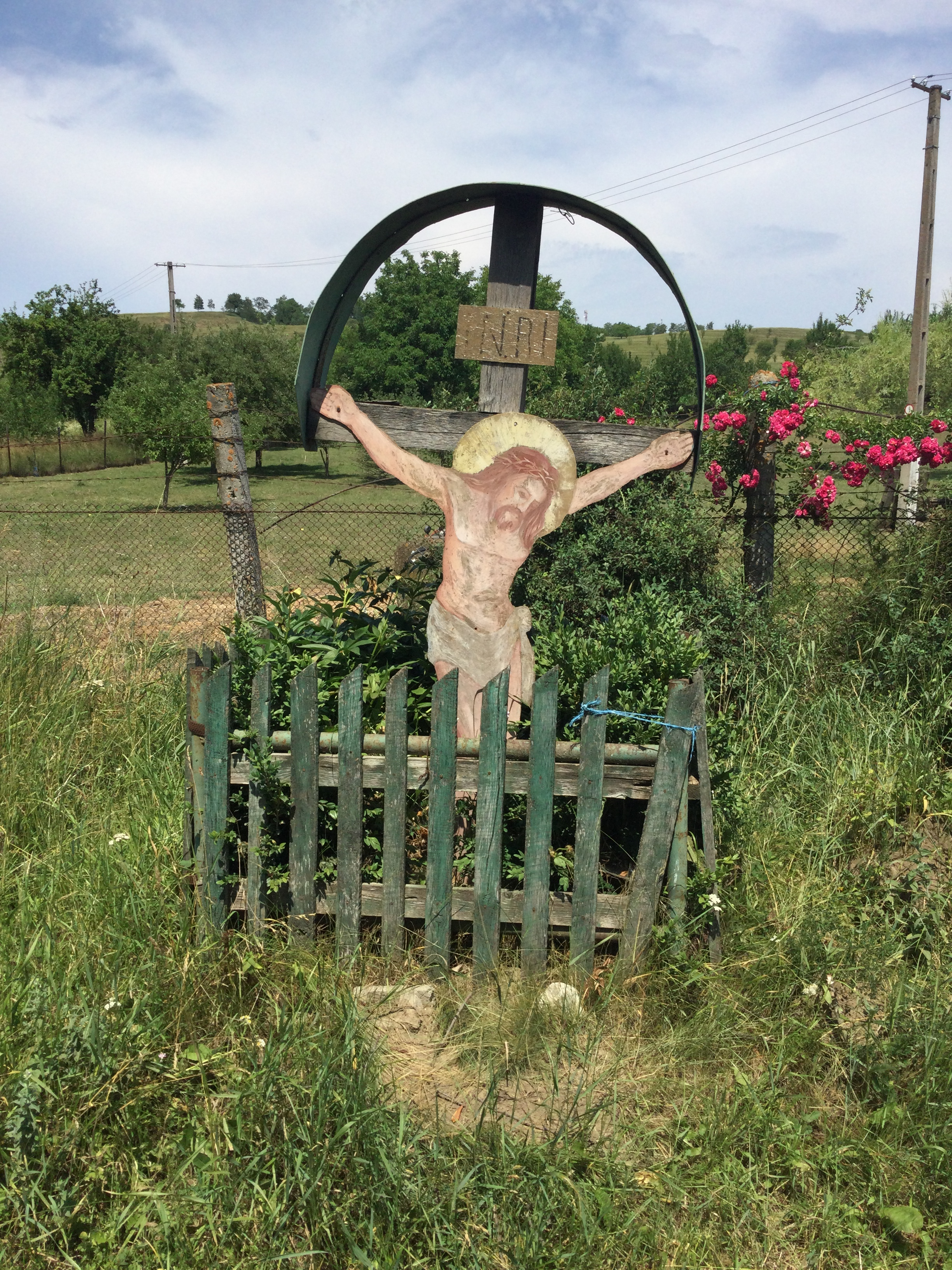
Șoarș: wayside crosses at the eastern (left) and western (right) entrances of the village

== List ==
The following wayside crosses are listed as historic monuments by Romania's Ministry of Culture and Religious Affairs. Nearly all are associated with the Romanian Orthodox faith.

Location	County	Date	Dedication	Image
Bucium	Alba	1802		
Gura Izbitei	Alba	1897	Andrei Șaguna	
Sartăș	Alba	20th century		
Șibot	Alba	1899		
Dezna	Arad	1827		
Dezna	Arad	1841		
Hălmagiu	Arad	1934	World War I dead	
Iosășel	Arad	1934	Ioan Buteanu	
Neudorf	Arad	1841		
Săud	Bihor	early 20th century	World War I dead	
Brașov	Brașov	1810	Junii Brașoveni (Bătrâni)	
Brașov	Brașov	19th century	Junii Brașoveni (Roșiori)	
Brașov	Brașov	1671, repaired 1902	Junii Brașoveni (Curcani)	
Brașov	Brașov	1748, repaired 1901	Ilie Birt (founder)	
Brașov	Brașov	1762	Ilie Birt (founder)	
Săcele	Brașov	18th century		
Săcele	Brașov	19th century		
Săcele	Brașov	1918		
Oțelu Roșu	Caraș-Severin	19th century		
Oțelu Roșu	Caraș-Severin	1922–1925	World War I dead	
Beliș	Cluj		Peasants shot in autumn 1918	
Cluj-Napoca	Cluj	1940	Albert Szenczi Molnár	
Adânca	Dâmbovița	mid-19th century		
Mislea	Dâmbovița	19th century		
Răzvad	Dâmbovița	19th century		
Țuglui	Dolj	19th century		
Câlnic	Gorj	1916–1919	World War I dead	
Rasovița	Gorj	20th century		
Almaș-Săliște	Hunedoara	1942–1945	Romanian soldiers	
Boiu de Jos	Hunedoara	1916–1918	World War I dead	
Buceș	Hunedoara	1934		
Crișcior	Hunedoara	1934	Revolt of Horea, Cloșca and Crișan	
Curechiu	Hunedoara	1934		
Mesteacăn	Hunedoara	1934		
Mihăileni	Hunedoara	1934	Revolt of Horea, Cloșca and Crișan, 1848 Revolution	
Ribița	Hunedoara	1934		
Berbești	Maramureș	18th century		
Ieud	Maramureș	1935		
Mireșu Mare	Maramureș	1940	World War I dead	
Someș-Uileac	Maramureș	1946	World War I and II dead	
Stoiceni	Maramureș	1938	World War I dead	
Baia de Aramă	Mehedinți			
Bâlvănești	Mehedinți			
Drobeta-Turnu Severin	Mehedinți	1916–1918		
Godeanu	Mehedinți			
Marga	Mehedinți			
Prejna	Mehedinți			
Strehaia	Mehedinți			
Șiroca	Mehedinți			
Dăneasa	Olt			
Făgețelu	Olt	19th century		
Iancu Jianu	Olt	19th century		
Izvoru	Olt	19th century		
Oboga	Olt			
Fântânele	Sibiu	19th century		
Rășinari	Sibiu	1883		
Rod	Sibiu	1871		
Rod	Sibiu	1877		
Săliște	Sibiu	19th century		
Sibiel	Sibiu	1803		
Sibiel	Sibiu	1814		
Șelimbăr	Sibiu	1925	Battle of Șelimbăr and World War I dead	
Tilișca	Sibiu	19th century		
Turnu Roșu	Sibiu	18th century		
Bătinești	Vrancea	1924	German World War I dead	
Cârligele	Vrancea	1933	World War I dead	
Hăulișca	Vrancea	1937	World War I dead	
Poienița	Vrancea	1936	World War I dead	
Prisaca	Vrancea	1941	Independence War and World War I dead	
