= Gornovița =

Gornovița may refer to several villages in Romania:

- Gornovița, a village in the town of Tismana, Gorj County
- Gornovița, a village in Balta Commune, Mehedinți County
