= Bulti =

Bulti may be:

- Bulṭī, Arabic name of Nile tilapia, a type of fish used in Egyptian cuisine
- Bulti, older spelling of Balti:
  - Balti people, an ethnic group of Little Tibet
  - Balti language, their language
- Bulti, an Ethiopian surname
  - Wodajo Bulti (born 1957), Ethiopian long-distance runner

== See also ==
- Balti (disambiguation)
