= Topolnița Cave =

Cave in Romania

- Peștera Topolnița
- Location within Romania
- Location: Mehedinți County, Romania
- Coordinates: 44°49′05.9″N 22°33′46.6″E
- Length: 11–20.5 km (6.8–12.7 mi)
- Elevation: 453 m (1,486 ft)
- Discovery: V. Dumitrescu (1880)
- Entrances: 4
- Access: Once a year (August)
- Cave survey: Emil Racoviță Institute of Speleology (1962)

Topolnița Cave (Romanian: Peștera Topolnița) is a karst cave located in Mehedinți County, Romania. It is the fourth-longest cave in Romania: only Peștera Vântului, Humpleu-Poienița Cave, and Hodobana Cave are longer. Most speleological sources estimate its length at 20.5 km (12.7 mi), although a length of 22 km (14 mi) has also been reported. Some Romanian news sources report a more conservative 11,000 metres (36,000 feet). It is considered a natural monument of Romania.

The cave was first historically documented in 1880 by V. Dumitrescu. The first serious attempt at scientific exploration was made in 1956 by Sever Popescu of Turnu Severin. Finally, specialists from the Emil Racoviță Institute of Speleology at the Romanian Academy began true systematic exploration in 1962.

== Description ==
Topolnița Cave is located at 30 kilometres (19 mi) from Drobeta-Turnu Severin, between the villages of Marga and Cireșu. It has at least four entrances. The cave's primary entrance is in the central part of the Mehedinți Plateau, where the Topolnița River plunges 50 m (160 ft) down into the earth. The river later emerges farther downstream at the foot of a hill.

Topolnița Cave has a huge number of passages and galleries arranged over five floors, many of which have attracted fanciful names as a result of the speleothems that have formed in them. One of the largest galleries, at 1,570 m (5,150 ft) long, is named the Racoviță Gallery in honor of Emil Racoviță, a noted Romanian explorer. Approximately 100–150 m (330–490 ft) from the entrance is the Bat's Gallery, containing a bat colony and a large guano heap. Other features within the cave include lakes, waterfalls, rapids, and massive forests of stalactites and stalagmites. Neolithic remains have also been found within the cave.

== Cave access ==
Best described as "labyrinthine", Topolnița Cave is a difficult cave to explore even for experienced cavers. Access for tourists is permitted only once per year, on a feast day in August, where guides lead tours 100 m (330 ft) into the cave to view the Racoviță Gallery. Otherwise, the cave is gated and access is only available by permission of the Romanian Academy. In the 1980s, there was some government interest in adding tourist-access features such as stairs, railings, and electric lights, but funding fell through before the Romanian Revolution and nothing was completed.

== Fauna ==
The cave's temperature hovers between 8.2–10.8 °C (46.8–51.4 °F), making it a relatively warm cave. As a result, it is a suitable habitat for some fauna, including the largest colony of greater horseshoe bats in Europe. A 2015 survey conducted as part of an effort to protect Romania's bats found 7,482 individual horseshoe bats living in the cave. The colony in the Bat's Gallery is mainly composed of insectivorous Mediterranean horseshoe bats, Daubenton's bats, and long-fingered bats. Radiocarbon dating has shown that the bat guano from that colony has been continuously deposited since 1694.

In 2009, a pair of bearded vultures was spotted at the cave by hunters. The sighting was treated with some excitement, as the bearded vulture is no longer extant in Romania.

Plenty of invertebrate species live in or around Topolnița Cave. Specimens of Clausiliidae, or door snails, such as Macedonica marginata, have been found in the cave. A number of species of Opiliones, colloquially known as harvestmen, have been recorded.
