= Huney =

Uninhabited tidal island in the Shetland Islands, Scotland

Location
- Huney shown within Shetland
- OS grid reference: HP648063
- Coordinates: 60.735095°N 0.811143°W

Physical geography
- Island group: Shetland
- Area: 17 hectares (42 acres)
- Highest elevation: 19 m (62 ft)

Administration
- Council area: Shetland Islands
- Country: Scotland
- Sovereign state: United Kingdom

Demographics
- Population: 0

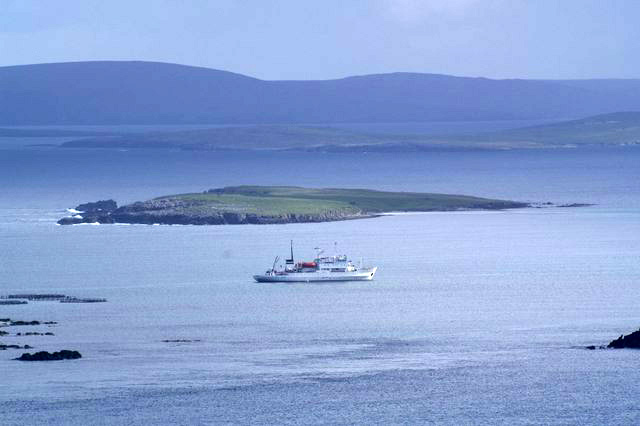
Huney from Unst

Huney is an uninhabited island due east of the island of Unst in the Shetland Islands, Scotland. The island is located approximately 1 kilometre south west of Balta and has an area of just under 0.2 square kilometres (0.08 sq mi). Huney is separated from Unst by a narrow channel called The Yei. At extremely low tides a sandy tombolo may connect Huney to Unst.

The World War I British E-class submarine E49 was sunk in the channel between Huney and Balta with the loss of 3 officers and 28 ratings on 12 March 1917. The submarine was heading out of Balta Sound on patrol when it struck a naval mine probably lain by German U-boat UC-76. The wreck is now a designated war grave.
