= Balta (surname) =

Balta is a surname. Notable people with the surname include:

- Hakan Balta (born 1983), Turkish midfielder footballer who plays for Galatasaray S.K.
- José Balta (1814–1872), Peruvian soldier and president of Peru, 1868–1872
- Ksenija Balta (born 1986), Estonian athlete
- María Balta, Peruvian politician
- Paul Balta (1929–2019), French journalist and writer
- Víctor Balta (born 1986), Peruvian football defender who plays for Juan Aurich
