= Balta Albă =

Balta Albă may refer to several places in Romania:

- Balta Albă, Buzău, a commune in Buzău County
- Titan, Bucharest, a borough in Bucharest also known as Balta Albă

== See also ==
- Balta (disambiguation)
