= Balta Verde =

Balta Verde may refer to several villages in Romania:

- Balta Verde, a village in Podari Commune, Dolj County
- Balta Verde, a village in the commune of Gogoșu, Mehedinți

== See also ==
- Balta (disambiguation)
