= Constantin Gruiescu =

Romanian boxer (1945–2024)

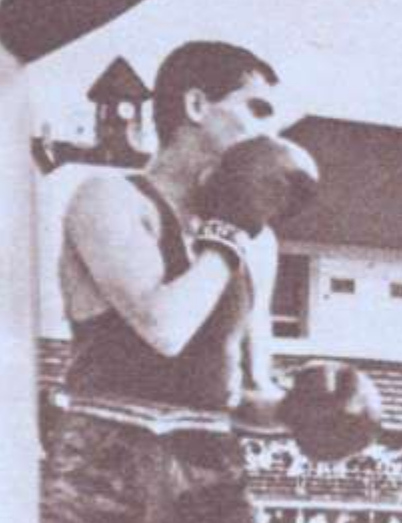

Personal information
- Nationality: Romanian
- Born: 24 June 1945 Godeanu, Romania
- Died: 22 July 2024 (aged 79)

Sport
- Sport: Boxing
Medal record
Representing Romania
Romania National Amateur Boxing Championships
Gold medal – first place	1967 Bucharest	Flyweight
Gold medal – first place	1968 Bucharest	Flyweight
Silver medal – second place	1969 Bucharest	Flyweight
Gold medal – first place	1970 Bucharest	Flyweight
Gold medal – first place	1971 Bucharest	Flyweight
Silver medal – second place	1973 Cluj	Flyweight
World Amateur Championships
Bronze medal – third place	1974 Havana	Flyweight
European Amateur Championships
Bronze medal – third place	1971 Madrid	Flyweight
Gold medal – first place	1973 Belgrade	Flyweight
Silver medal – second place	1975 Katowice	Flyweight

Constantin Gruiescu (24 June 1945 – 22 July 2024) was a Romanian boxer. He competed at the 1972 Summer Olympics and the 1976 Summer Olympics. Gruiescu died on 22 July 2024, at the age of 79.
