= Ilie Birt =

Romanian merchant (1698 – 1786)

- Born: 1698; Șcheii Brașovului
- Died: 29 December 1786 (aged 87–88)
- Occupation: merchant

Ilie Birt (1698 – 29 December 1786) was an ethnic Romanian merchant from the Principality of Transylvania.

== Commercial and military activity ==
He was a native of Șcheii Brașovului, where his family dealt in wine and livestock. He married a merchant's daughter and had eight children. Aside from his native Romanian, Birt knew German, Hungarian, Greek and Turkish. For this reason, he represented the local Romanian community in the royal capitals Buda and Vienna, arguing for their right to sell anywhere. He petitioned the Holy Roman Emperor to establish a republic at Șchei, but was ignored.

A captain in the Army of the Holy Roman Empire, Birt took part in the Austro-Turkish War of 1737–1739. In 1737, he formed a company, largely composed of Junii Brașoveni troops. Under orders from Field Marshal Count Wallis, Birt and his men engaged the Ottoman forces at Pitești, capturing 36 prisoners of war. Even after retiring from the hussars, Birt continued to sign as “captain”, underscoring his prestige. Wallis awarded him a medal, as did three other commanders, including Prince Lobkowitz and Count Traun.

== Crosses and legends ==
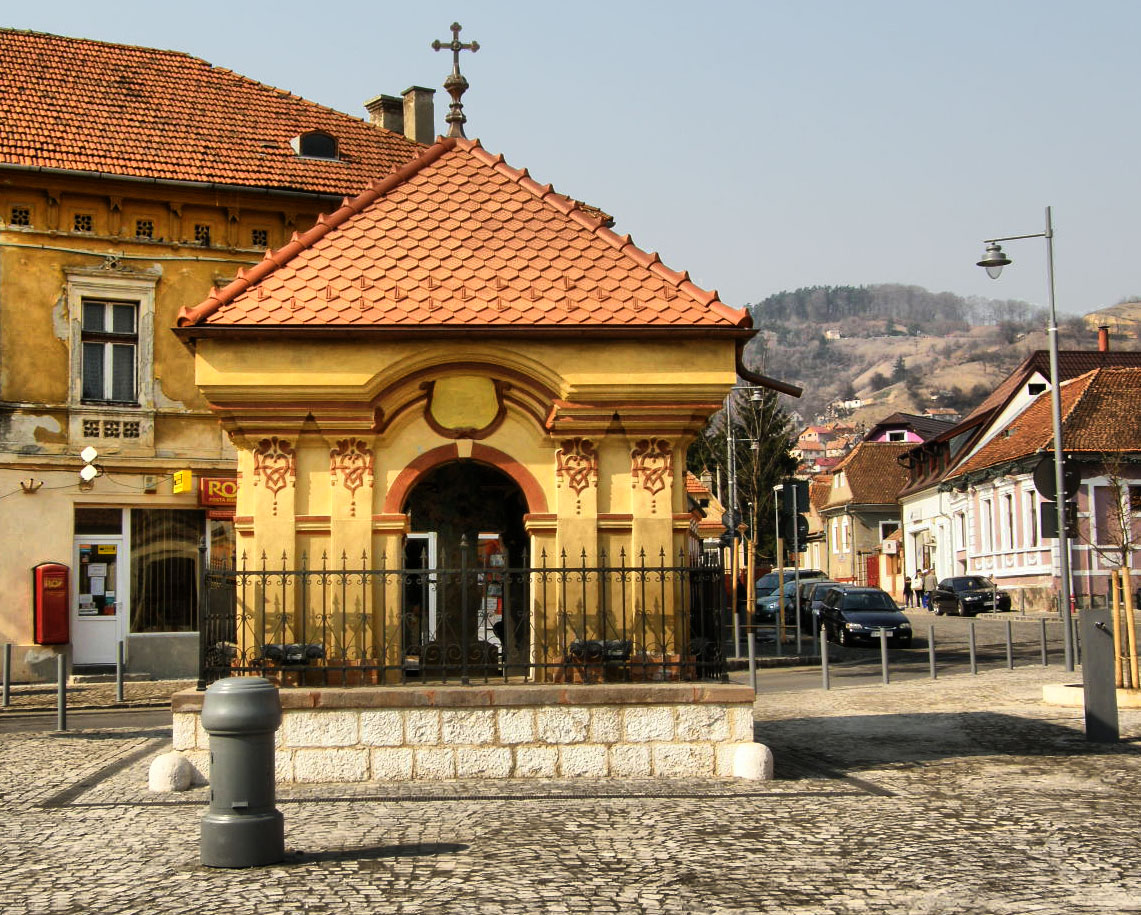
Ilie Birt's wayside cross in Union Square, Brașov

Birt contributed generously to St. Nicholas Church and the affiliated First Romanian School. His request to found a church was denied, so he instead built wayside crosses. Just two of many survive; they are built of stone and were thus more difficult to demolish. One is on Piața Prundului, while the other is by his house, on the street that bears his name. His activity provoked a fifteen-year feud with the Transylvanian Saxon city authorities, in particular the magistrate. Irate that Birt had not asked permission to build, they sought to tear them down. Pointing to his war record and medals, Birt stood his ground. Eventually, in 1761, the crosses were approved on condition they never be enlarged or fenced in.

Legend holds that Birt kept part of his war loot, making a fortune. He also engaged in contraband alcohol trade, ignoring the Saxons’ warnings and never paying taxes. He took advantage of a law exempting from duties the amount of alcohol one could consume in a winter; whenever an inspector arrived, he stated the wine was for personal use. Another legend says he was a usurer who threatened his debtors, even holding a gun to their heads while they slept. An avid shooter, Birt when drunk would gallop through the city center, gun in hand. As he was always armed, the Saxons arranged to have him arrested while in church, where guns were prohibited. Tried in Casa Sfatului, he was acquitted and freed. In 1759, the magistrate accused Birt of illegally fishing in the Ghimbășel, swearing at the watchmen who approached to caution him.

Described as “a quintessential Șchei character”, Birt died a very wealthy man at age 88. He owned a valuable house, a garden, land in Poiana Brașov, herds of livestock and vineyards in Wallachia.
