= Balta (Topolnița) =

River in Romania

- Location within Romania

Location
- Country: Romania
- Counties: Mehedinți County
- Villages: Costești, Balta

Physical characteristics
- Mouth: Topolnița
  - location: Sfodea
  - coordinates: 44.8512°N 22.6044°E
- Length: 17 km (11 mi)
- Basin size: 48 km^{2} (19 sq mi)

Basin features
- Progression: Topolnița→ Danube→ Black Sea

The Balta is a left tributary of the river Topolnița in Romania. It flows into the Topolnița in Sfodea. Its length is 17 km (11 mi) and its basin size is 48 km^{2} (19 sq mi).
