= Topolnița =

- Location within Romania

Location
- Country: Romania
- Counties: Mehedinți County
- Villages: Mălărișca, Schitu Topolniței, Izvoru Bârzii, Drobeta-Turnu Severin

Physical characteristics
- Mouth: Danube
  - location: Drobeta-Turnu Severin
  - coordinates: 44.6204°N 22.6883°E
- Length: 44 km (27 mi)
- Basin size: 360 km^{2} (140 sq mi)

Basin features
- Progression: Danube→ Black Sea
- Tributaries
  - left: Balta, Păunești, Neagonea, Pleșuva
  - right: Clișevăț, Șușița

The Topolnița is a left tributary of the river Danube in Romania. In the central Mehedinți Plateau it descends into Topolnița Cave, eventually emerging at the foot of a hill downstream. It discharges into the Danube in Drobeta-Turnu Severin. Its length is 44 km (27 mi) and its basin size is 360 km^{2} (140 sq mi).
