= Balta Sound =

Sound on Unst, Shetland Islands, Scotland, UK

Coordinates: 60°45′18″N 0°50′24″W

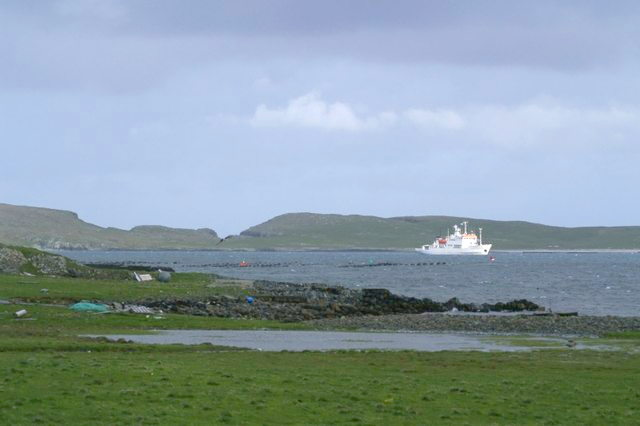
Balta Sound, the sound separating Balta isle from Unst.

Balta Sound is a sound (inlet) on the east coast of the island of Unst in the Shetland Islands, Scotland. The sound is sheltered from the North Sea to the east by the uninhabited island of Balta. The sound is subject to daily tides.

The settlement at the west of the sound is Baltasound taking its name from the sound. On the land to the south of the Sound is Unst Airport.

== History ==
In the 19th and early 20th century, Chromate of iron was mined on the north side of Balta Sound and taken away in ships via the Sound to Leith and Bo'ness.

In 1894, Balta sound was described as "altogether about 2 miles long and half a mile wide."

On 12 March 1917, the World War I British E-class submarine HMS E49 was heading out of Balta Sound on patrol when it struck a naval mine laid by German U-boat SM UC-76. It was sunk in the channel between the islands of Huney and Balta with the loss of the entire crew. The site of the wreck is now designated as a war grave. There is a memorial at Hamar, near Baltasound.

== Fishing ==
The OS Map of Balta Sound from 1902 shows that at that time there were a large number of fish curing stations in the inner part of the sound. There was also a fish oil factory. In 1901 almost ten thousand fishermen and shore workers came to Balta Sound, at a time when its off-season population numbered 500. The weight and value of fish landed peaked in 1905, but subsequently went into decline, as the newly adopted steam drifters, which came to dominate the Shetland fishery, could make their way to Lerwick and land their catch there:

Fishery Statistics

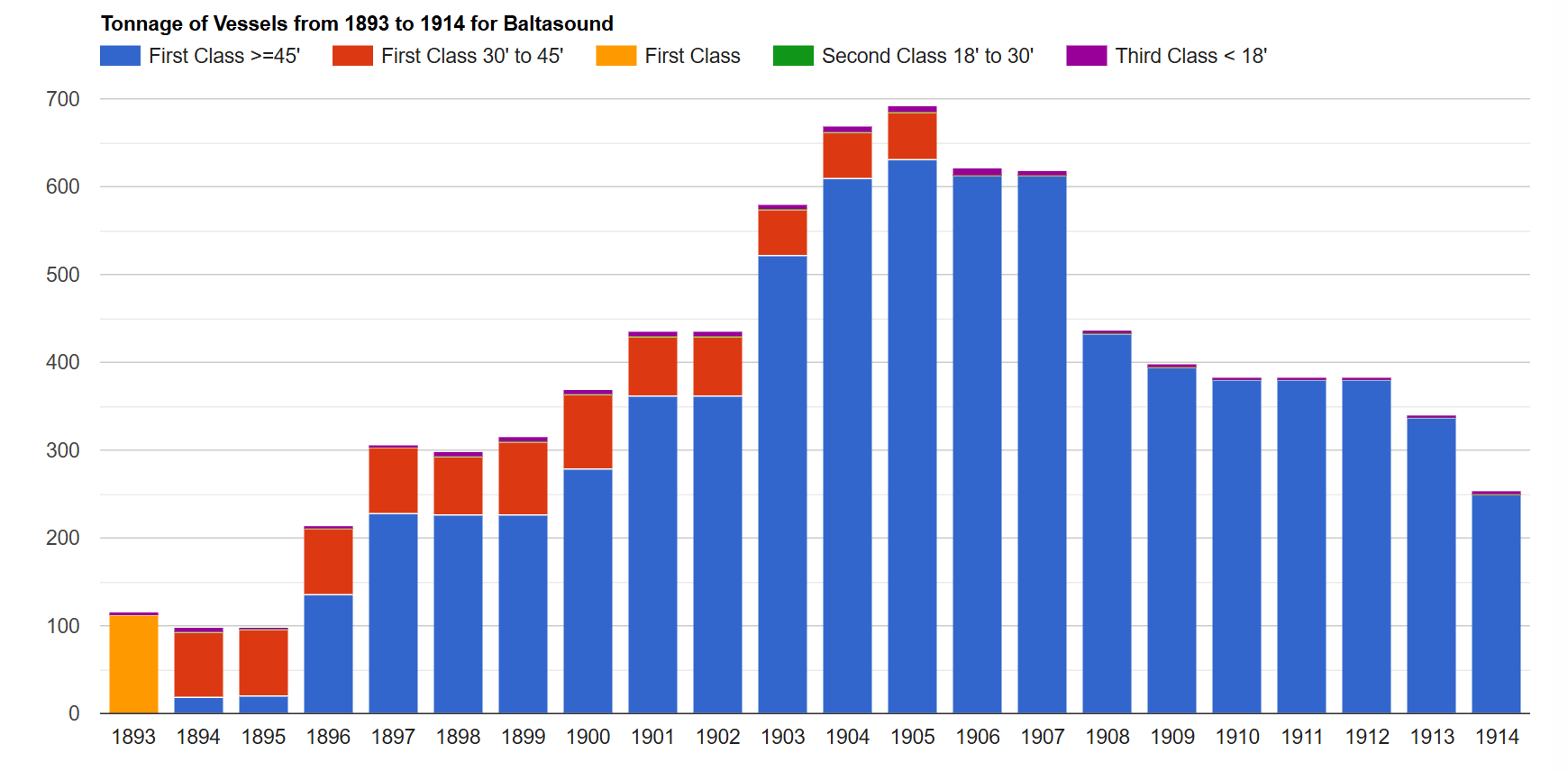
Tonnage of vessels

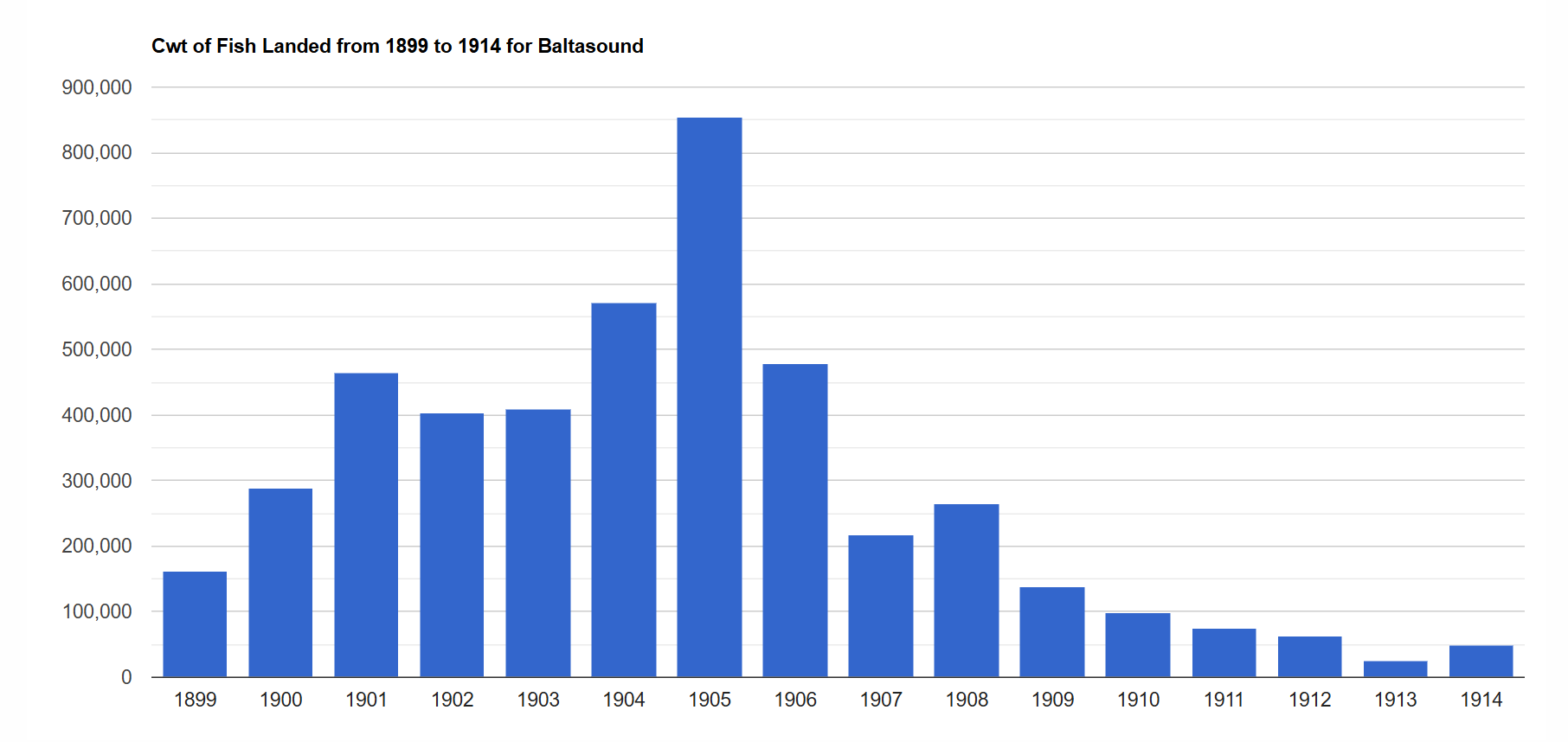
Cwt of fish landed

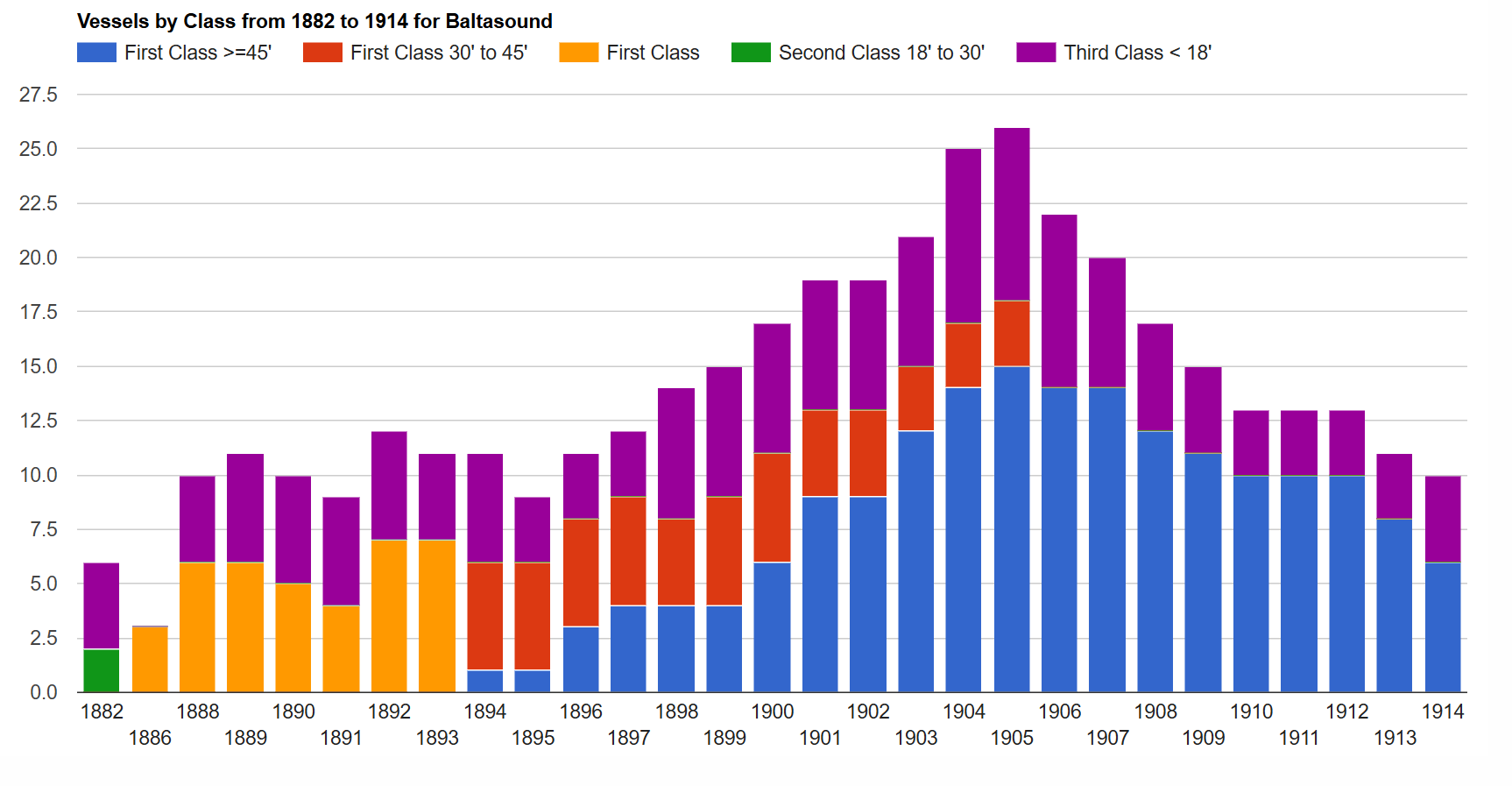
Vessels by class

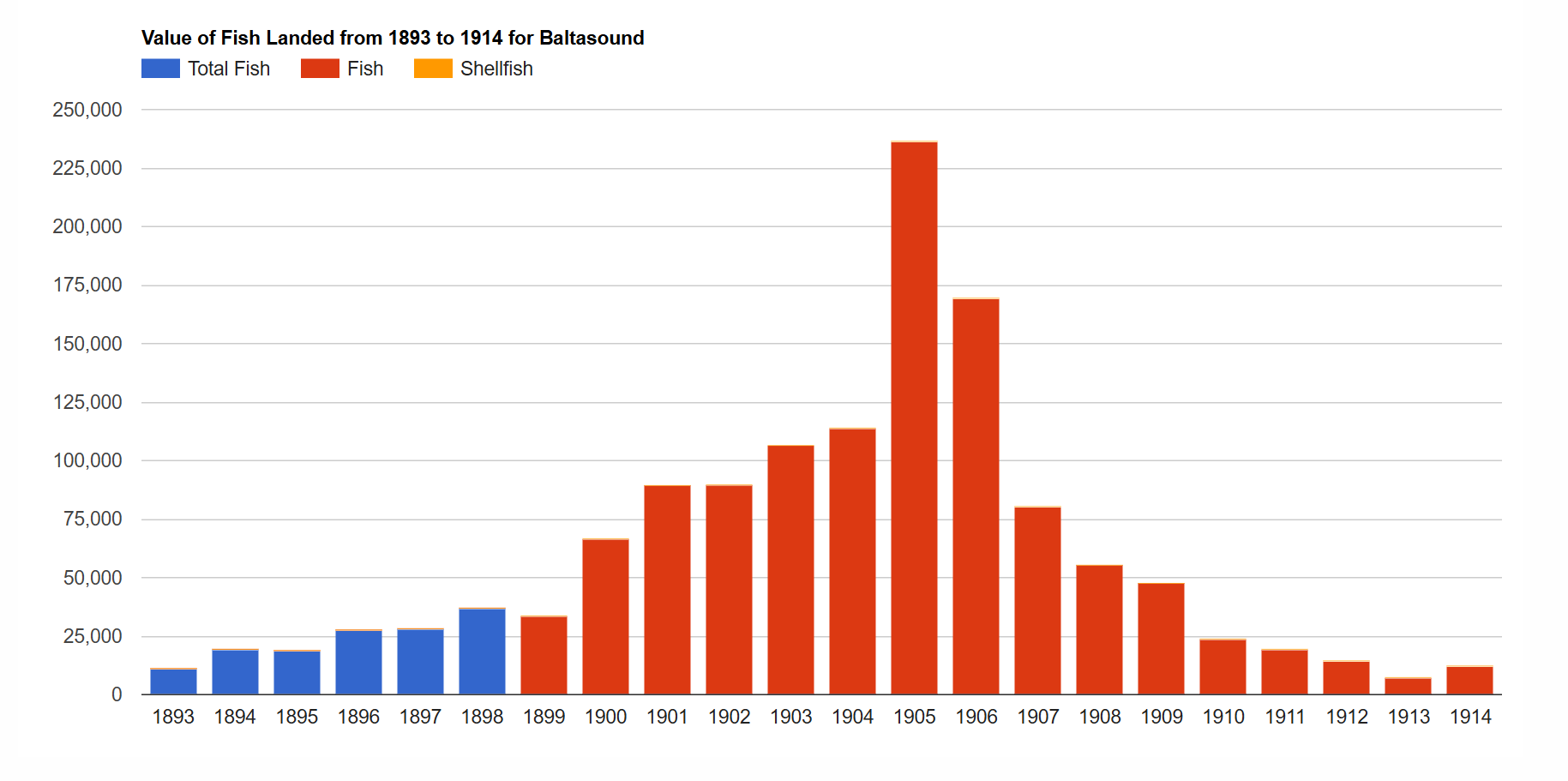
Value (£] of fish landed

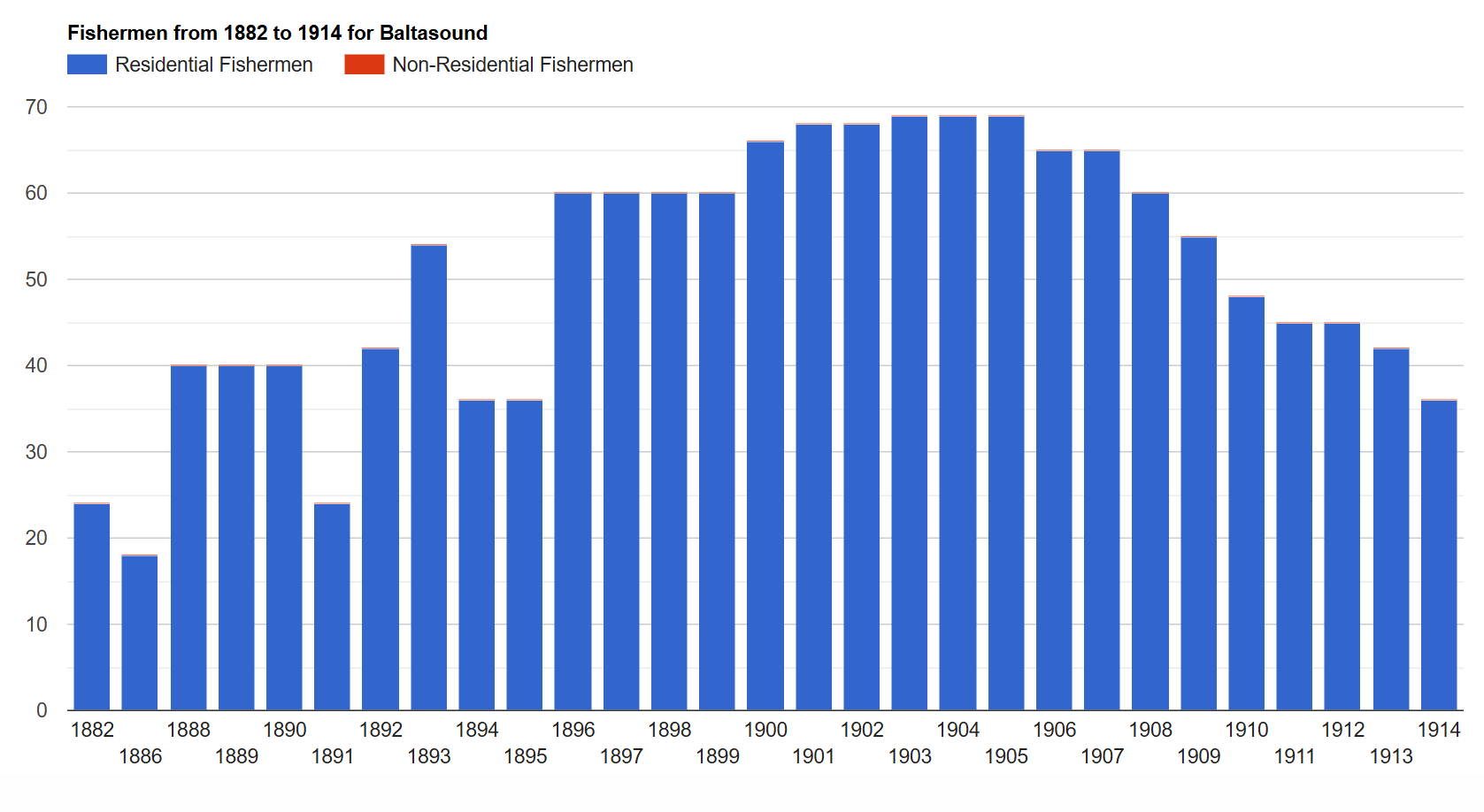
Fishermen

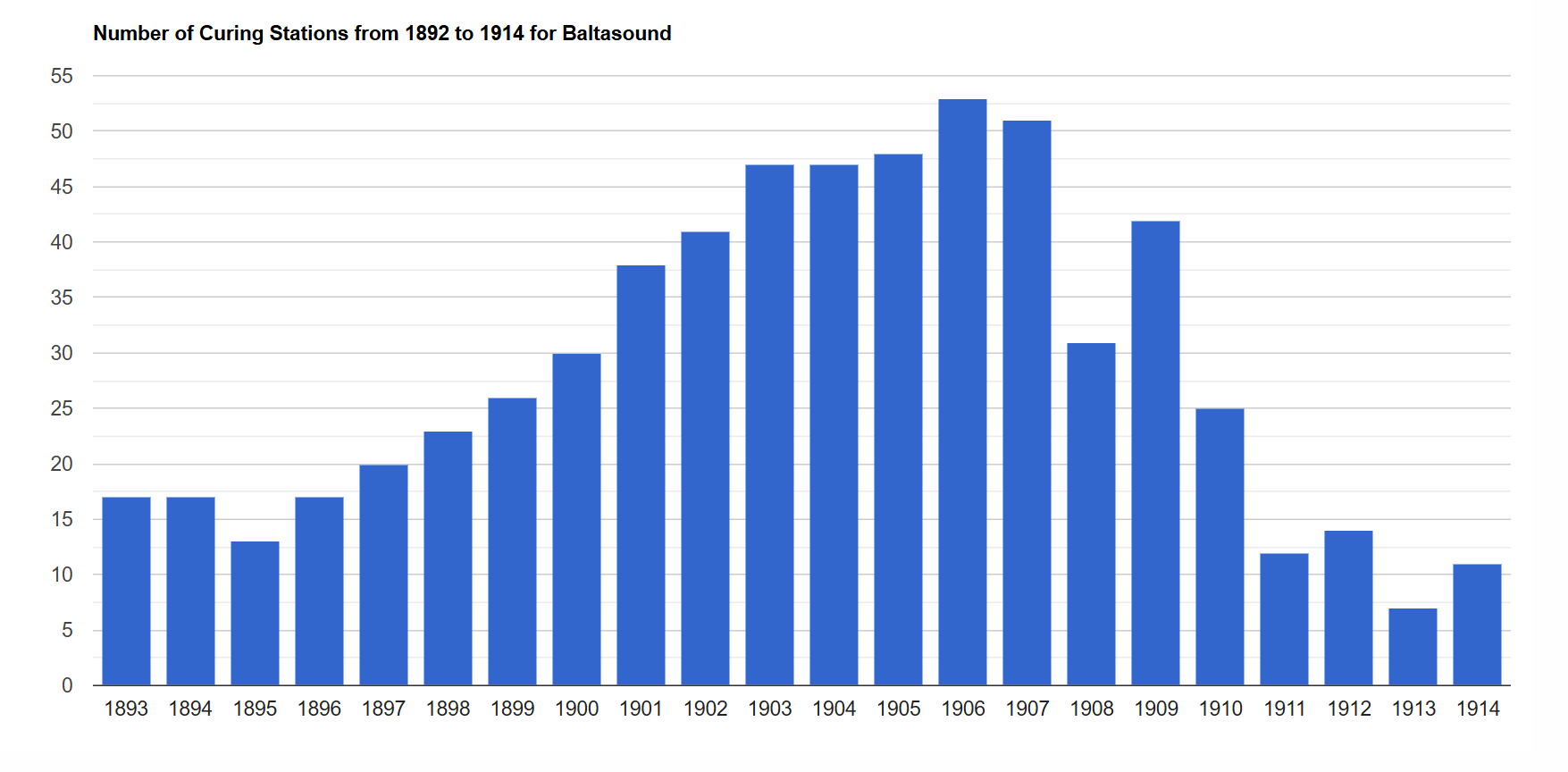
Number of curing stations

== Nautical facilities ==
There is a harbour facility with anchorages for ships. There is a pier with berths for up to 160 metres in length.

The dept of water in the harbour is given as 5.0 metres.
