= Iron(II) chromite =

Names
- IUPAC name Iron(2+) chromite
- Other names: Ferrous chromite

Identifiers
CAS Number	1308-31-2
3D model (JSmol)	Interactive image
ChemSpider	65793926
ECHA InfoCard	100.013.782
EC Number	215-159-3
PubChem CID	129627662
RTECS number	GB4000000
UNII	W86U2Q2334
CompTox Dashboard (EPA)	DTXSID10892418
- InChI: InChI=1S/2Cr.Fe.4O/q;;+2;;;2*-1 Key: VUIWSEWFMMYPHW-UHFFFAOYSA-N
- SMILES: O=[Cr][O-].O=[Cr][O-].[Fe+2]

Properties
Chemical formula	FeCr_{2}O_{4}
Molar mass	223.833 g·mol^{−1}
Appearance	Brown-black solid
Density	5.0 g/cm^{3}
Melting point	2,190 to 2,270 °C (3,970 to 4,120 °F; 2,460 to 2,540 K)
Solubility in water	insoluble
Refractive index (n_{D})	2.16

Structure
Crystal structure	cubic
Space group	Fd-3m (No. 227)
Lattice constant	a = 8.378 Å α = 90°, β = 90°, γ = 90°

Hazards
- GHS labelling
Pictograms	(GHS07: Exclamation mark)
Signal word	Warning
Hazard statements	H302+H332, H317
Precautionary statements	P261, P280, P301+P312, P304+P340, P312, P501
Threshold limit value (TLV)	0.5 mg/m^{3} (as Cr, long term value)
- NIOSH (US health exposure limits)
PEL (Permissible)	0.5 mg/m^{3} (as Cr, long term value)

Related compounds
Other anions	Iron(III) chromate
Other cations	Copper chromite
- Except where otherwise noted, data are given for materials in their standard state (at 25 °C [77 °F], 100 kPa). Infobox references

Iron(II) chromite is an inorganic compound with the chemical formula FeCr_{2}O_{4}.

== Occurrence ==
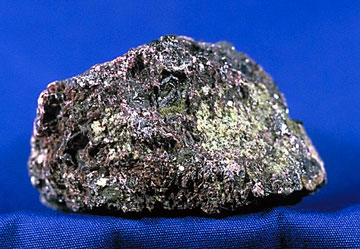
Chromite, a FeCr_{2}O_{4} containing mineral

Iron(II) chromite occurs in mineral form as chromite. It is used as a commercial source of chromium and its compounds.

== Preparation ==
Iron(II) chromite can be prepared by heating chromium(III) oxide and iron(III) oxide at 1,200 °C (2,190 °F) for 24 h in a controlled oxygen fugacity. Single crystals can be prepared by floating zone crystal growth.

== Structure ==
Iron(II) chromite exhibits polymorphism. At standard conditions it forms a cubic spinel-type structure. A cubic-tetragonal phase transition occurs at 135 K (−138 °C; −217 °F), followed by a tetragonal-orthorhombic transition at 70 K (−203.2 °C; −333.7 °F). The space group of the tetragonal phase is I4_{1}/amd.

== Uses ==
It is used as a catalyst in the synthesis of hydrogen (H_{2}) from the reaction between carbon monoxide and water vapor.
