= Balta, Russia =

Balta (Russian: Балта) is the name of several rural localities in Russia:

- Balta, Republic of Buryatia, an ulus in Mukhorshibirsky District of the Republic of Buryatia
- Balta, Republic of North Ossetia–Alania, a selo under the administrative jurisdiction of the city of Vladikavkaz, Republic of North Ossetia–Alania
- Balta, Novosibirsk Oblast, a village in Moshkovsky District of Novosibirsk Oblast
