= Cireșu, Mehedinți =

Cireșu
- Commune
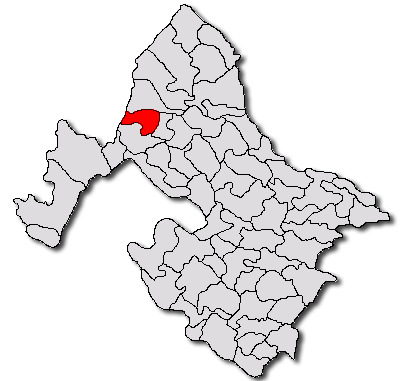
- Location in Mehedinți County

- Location in Romania
- Coordinates: 44°49′N 22°32′E
- Country: Romania
- County: Mehedinți
- Area: 52.92 km^{2} (20.43 sq mi)
- Population (2021-12-01): 483
  - Density: 9.13/km^{2} (23.6/sq mi)
- Time zone: UTC+02:00 (EET)
  - Summer (DST): UTC+03:00 (EEST)
- Vehicle reg.: MH

Cireșu is a commune located in Mehedinți County, Oltenia, Romania. It is composed of four villages: Bunoaica, Cireșu, Jupânești, and Negrușa.

== See also ==
- Topolnița Cave
