= Hodobana Cave =

Third largest cave in Romania

- Location within Romania
- Location: Arieșeni, Alba County, Romania
- Coordinates: 46°28′0″N 22°47′0″E
- Depth: 181 m (594 ft)
- Length: 22.142 km (72,640 ft)
- Discovery: 1979
- Geology: limestone
- Entrances: 1

Hodobana Cave is a limestone cave located in the Bihor Mountains of Romania. The entrance, discovered in April 1979 by Florin Păroiu and Nicolae Sasu, is located on the side of the Hodobana stream at an altitude of 980 m. The cave was explored and surveyed during a series of expeditions between 1979 and 1987, and has a length of 22,142 meters, making it one of the longest caves in Romania. It is the most branched natural cave in Romania.
