= Balta, Republic of Buryatia =

Balta Балта
- Ulus
- Location within Republic of Buryatia Location within Russia
- Coordinates: 51°04′N 107°09′E
- Country: Russia
- Region: Republic of Buryatia
- District: Mukhorshibirsky District
- Time zone: UTC+8:00

Balta (Russian: Балта) is a rural locality (an ulus) in Mukhorshibirsky District, Republic of Buryatia, Russia. The population was 301 as of 2010. There are 4 streets.

== Geography ==
Balta is located 53 km west of Mukhorshibir (the district's administrative centre) by road. Tsolga is the nearest rural locality.
