= Godeanu =

- Commune
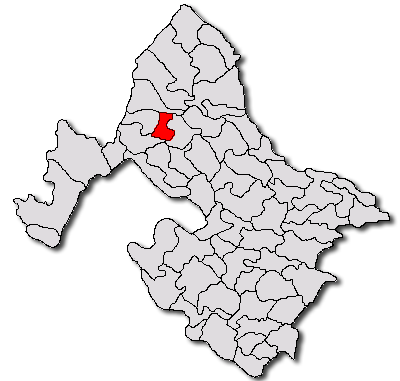
- Location in Mehedinți County

- Location in Romania
- Coordinates: 44°48′N 22°36′E
- Country: Romania
- County: Mehedinți
- Area: 44.87 km^{2} (17.32 sq mi)
- Population (2021-12-01): 497
  - Density: 11.1/km^{2} (28.7/sq mi)
- Time zone: UTC+02:00 (EET)
  - Summer (DST): UTC+03:00 (EEST)
- Vehicle reg.: MH

Godeanu is a commune located in Mehedinți County, Oltenia, Romania. It is composed of four villages: Godeanu, Marga, Păunești, and Șiroca.

== Natives ==
- Constantin Gruiescu (born 1945), boxer

== See also ==
- Topolnița Cave
