= María Balta =

Peruvian politician

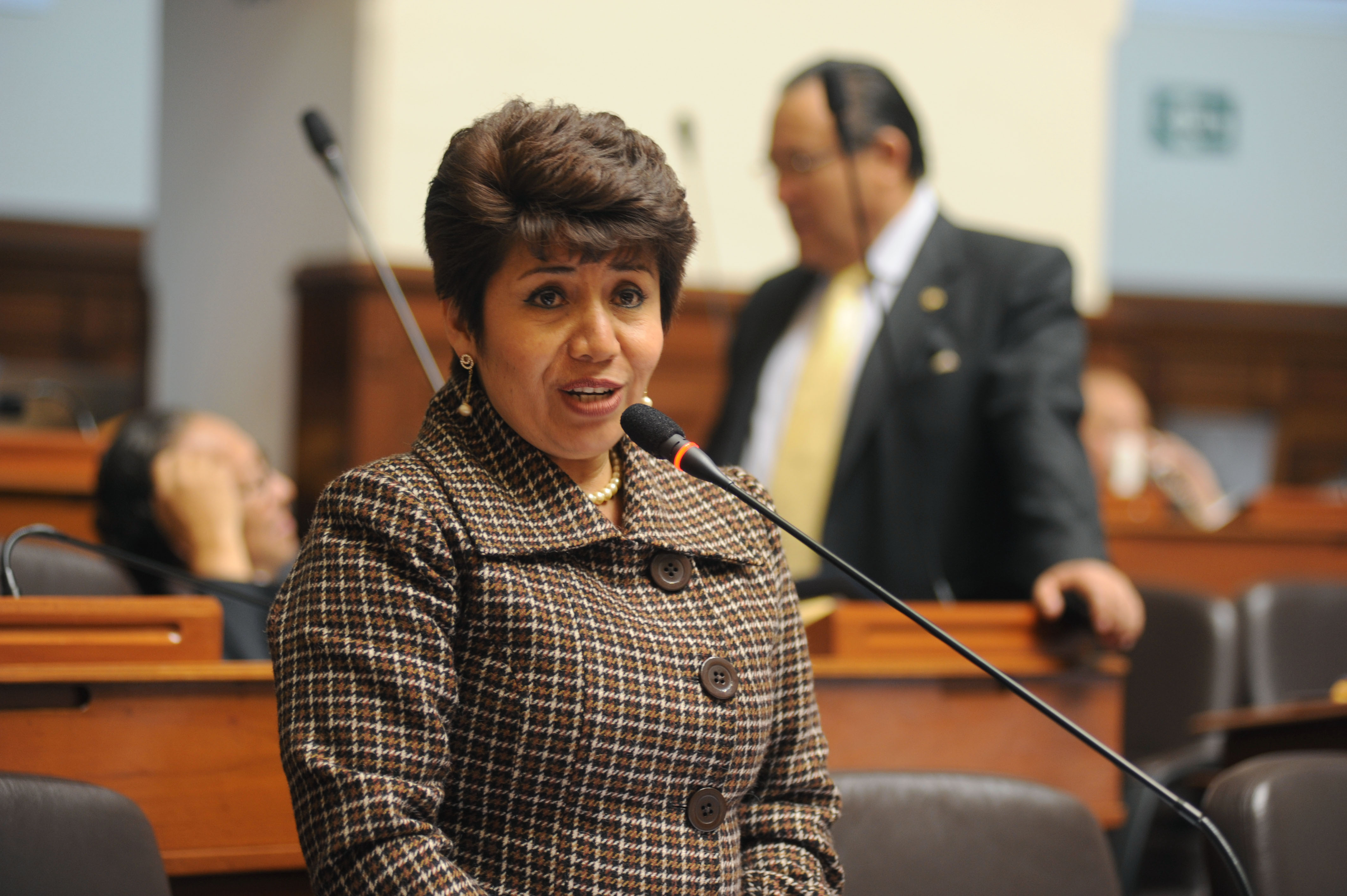
María Helvezia Balta Salazar.

María Helvezia Balta Salazar is a Peruvian politician. She is a Congresswoman representing Ancash for the period 2006–2011, and belongs to the Peruvian Aprista Party.
