= Balti =

Balti may refer to:

== Places ==
- Bălți, a city in Moldova
- Bălți County (Moldova), a former county of Moldova
- Bălți County (Romania), a former county of Romania
- Balti Power Plant, one of two Narva Power Plants in Estonia
- Bălți Steppe, a grassland in northern Moldova
- Balti Triangle, an area of Birmingham, England
- Balti jaam (Baltic station), Tallinn railway station

== People ==
- Balti, Latin for the Balts
- Balti (singer) (born 1980), Tunisian singer, rapper, composer and music producer
- Bianca Balti, Italian model
- Justine Baltazar, also known as "Balti", Filipino basketball player

== Other uses ==
- Balti (food), a curry from Birmingham, UK
- Balti dynasty, a branch of the ancient Visigoths
- Balti language spoken in Baltistan and Ladakh in Kashmir
- Balti people, an ethnic group of Tibetan origin in Baltistan
- Balti (film), 2025 Indian film

== See also ==
- Baltistan, a mountainous region in Gilgit-Baltistan, Pakistan-administered Kashmir
- Baltic (disambiguation)
- Balta (disambiguation)
