= Iron(III) chromate =

Names
- IUPAC name iron(III) chromate

Identifiers
CAS Number	10294-52-7
3D model (JSmol)	Interactive image
ChemSpider	10653099
ECHA InfoCard	100.030.588
EC Number	233-661-0
PubChem CID	21902690
UNII	O2123EJH4E
CompTox Dashboard (EPA)	DTXSID101045361
- InChI: InChI=1S/3Cr.2Fe.12O/q;;;2*+3;;;;;;;6*-1 Key: OXLBLZDGMWMXSM-UHFFFAOYSA-N
- SMILES: [O-][Cr](=O)(=O)[O-].[O-][Cr](=O)(=O)[O-].[O-][Cr](=O)(=O)[O-].[Fe+3].[Fe+3]

Properties
Chemical formula	Fe_{2}(CrO_{4})_{3}
Molar mass	459.6808 g/mol
Appearance	yellow powder
Solubility in water	reacts, see also solubility chart

Hazards
- Occupational safety and health (OHS/OSH)
Main hazards	toxic (contain Cr(VI))
- GHS labelling
Pictograms	(GHS06: Toxic) (GHS08: Health hazard)
Signal word	Danger
Hazard statements	H302, H317, H331, H350, H373
Precautionary statements	P203, P260, P264, P270, P271, P272, P280, P301+P317, P302+P352, P304+P340, P316, P318, P319, P321, P330, P333+P317, P362+P364, P403+P233, P405, P501
- Except where otherwise noted, data are given for materials in their standard state (at 25 °C [77 °F], 100 kPa). verify (what is ?) Infobox references

Iron(III) chromate is the iron(III) salt of chromic acid with the chemical formula Fe_{2}(CrO_{4})_{3}.

== Discovery ==
Iron(III) chromate was discovered by Samuel Hibbert-Ware in 1817 while visiting Shetland.

== Production ==
It may be formed by the salt metathesis reaction of potassium chromate and iron(III) nitrate, which gives potassium nitrate as byproduct.

2 Fe(NO_{3})_{3} + 3 K_{2}CrO_{4} → Fe_{2}(CrO_{4})3 + 6 KNO_{3}

It also can be formed by the oxidation by air of iron and chromium oxides in a basic environment:

4 Fe_{2}O_{3} + 6 Cr_{2}O_{3} + 9 O_{2} → 4 Fe_{2}(CrO_{4})_{3}
