= Balta, Shetland =

Uninhabited island in Shetland, Scotland

Balta
Location
- Balta shown within Shetland
- OS grid reference: HP661081
- Coordinates: 60.749746°N 0.791144°W

Name
- Old Norse name: Baltey

Physical geography
- Island group: Shetland
- Area: 80 ha (198 acres)
- Area rank: 162
- Highest elevation: 44 m (144 ft)

Administration
- Council area: Shetland Islands
- Country: Scotland
- Sovereign state: United Kingdom

Demographics
- Population: 0
- Balta Sound Lighthouse
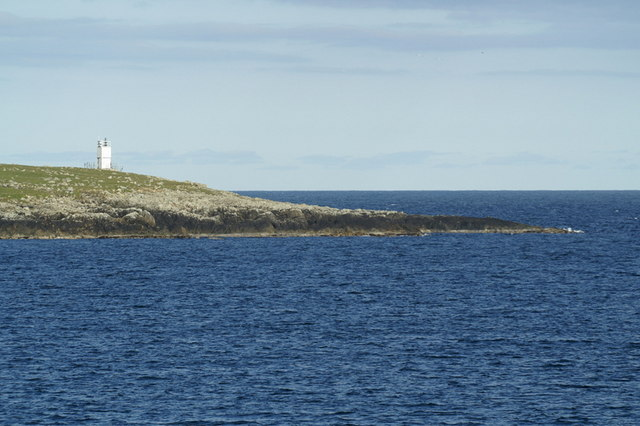
- South end of the Isle of Balta and lighthouse
- Constructed: 1895 (first)
- Foundation: concrete base
- Construction: metal skeletal tower (current) concrete tower (first)
- Automated: 2004
- Height: 6.5 metres (21 ft)
- Shape: quadrangular tower covered by aluminium panels with light on the top (current) cylindrical tower with balcony and lantern (first)
- Markings: white tower
- Power source: solar power
- First lit: 2004 (current)
- Focal height: 17 metres (56 ft)
- Range: white: 10 nautical miles (19 km; 12 mi) red: 7 nautical miles (13 km; 8.1 mi)
- Characteristic: Fl WR 10s.

Balta (Old Norse: "Baltey") is an uninhabited island in Shetland, Scotland.

== Geography ==
Balta lies off the east coast of Unst and is separated from it by Balta Sound. It has an area of 80 hectares (200 acres) and is about 2.4 km (1 1/2 miles) long.

There is a natural arch on the eastern side of the island.

Balta Island Seafare and Skaw Smolts are the most northerly fish farm and fish hatchery in Britain.

== History ==
Historic remains on the island include the ruins of a broch and of a Norse chapel dedicated to Saint Sunniva. There are no census records of more recent inhabitation.

John MacCulloch visited Balta in May 1820 to carry out the Trigonometrical Survey for the Ordnance Survey. Balta was the northernmost station of the zenith sector.

== Lighthouse ==
The Balta Light, at the southern tip of the island, was one of the first concrete structures in Shetland. The lighthouse was designed by David Stevenson and built in 1895. It was demolished in 2003 and replaced by a small solar-powered light.

== See also ==
- List of lighthouses in Scotland
- List of Northern Lighthouse Board lighthouses
