= Balta, Mehedinți =

Balta
- Commune
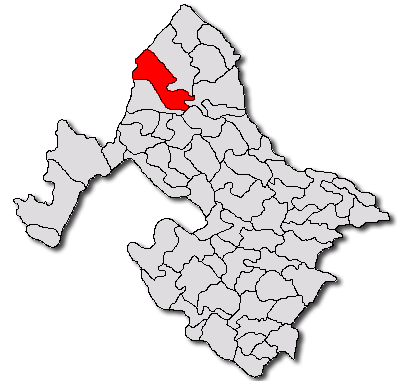
- Location in Mehedinți County

- Location in Romania
- Coordinates: 44°53′N 22°38′E
- Country: Romania
- County: Mehedinți
- Area: 125.55 km^{2} (48.48 sq mi)
- Population (2021-12-01): 976
  - Density: 7.77/km^{2} (20.1/sq mi)
- Time zone: UTC+02:00 (EET)
  - Summer (DST): UTC+03:00 (EEST)
- Vehicle reg.: MH

Balta is a commune located in Mehedinți County, Romania. It is composed of seven villages: Balta, Coada Cornetului, Costești, Gornovița, Nevățu, Prejna and Sfodea. It is situated in the historical region of Oltenia.
