= Boxing at the 1964 Summer Olympics =

Coordinates: 35.7043°N 139.7519°E

Boxing at the Games of the XVIII Olympiad
- Dates: 11-23 October 1964
- Competitors: 354 from 80 nations

The boxing competition at the 1964 Summer Olympics was held from 11 to 23 October. The competition was for men only and there were ten weight classes.

== Medal summary ==
Event	Gold	Silver	Bronze
Flyweight (<51 kg)	Fernando Atzori; Italy	Artur Olech; Poland	Robert John Carmody; United States
Flyweight (<51 kg)	Fernando Atzori; Italy	Artur Olech; Poland	Stanislav Sorokin; Soviet Union
Bantamweight (<54 kg)	Takao Sakurai; Japan	Chung Shin-Cho; South Korea	Juan Fabila Mendoza; Mexico
Bantamweight (<54 kg)	Takao Sakurai; Japan	Chung Shin-Cho; South Korea	Washington Rodríguez; Uruguay
Featherweight (<57 kg)	Stanislav Stepashkin; Soviet Union	Anthony Villanueva; Philippines	Heinz Schulz; United Team of Germany
Featherweight (<57 kg)	Stanislav Stepashkin; Soviet Union	Anthony Villanueva; Philippines	Charles Brown; United States
Lightweight (<60 kg)	Józef Grudzień; Poland	Velikton Barannikov; Soviet Union	Jim McCourt; Ireland
Lightweight (<60 kg)	Józef Grudzień; Poland	Velikton Barannikov; Soviet Union	Ronald Allen Harris; United States
Light welterweight (<63.5 kg)	Jerzy Kulej; Poland	Yevgeny Frolov; Soviet Union	Habib Galhia; Tunisia
Light welterweight (<63.5 kg)	Jerzy Kulej; Poland	Yevgeny Frolov; Soviet Union	Eddie Blay; Ghana
Welterweight (<67 kg)	Marian Kasprzyk; Poland	Ričardas Tamulis; Soviet Union	Pertti Purhonen; Finland
Welterweight (<67 kg)	Marian Kasprzyk; Poland	Ričardas Tamulis; Soviet Union	Silvano Bertini; Italy
Light middleweight (<71 kg)	Boris Lagutin; Soviet Union	Joseph Gonzales; France	Nojim Maiyegun; Nigeria
Light middleweight (<71 kg)	Boris Lagutin; Soviet Union	Joseph Gonzales; France	Józef Grzesiak; Poland
Middleweight (<75 kg)	Valeri Popenchenko; Soviet Union	Emil Schulz; United Team of Germany	Franco Valle; Italy
Middleweight (<75 kg)	Valeri Popenchenko; Soviet Union	Emil Schulz; United Team of Germany	Tadeusz Walasek; Poland
Light heavyweight (<81 kg)	Cosimo Pinto; Italy	Aleksei Kiselyov; Soviet Union	Alexander Nikolov; Bulgaria
Light heavyweight (<81 kg)	Cosimo Pinto; Italy	Aleksei Kiselyov; Soviet Union	Zbigniew Pietrzykowski; Poland
Heavyweight (>81 kg)	Joe Frazier; United States	Hans Huber; United Team of Germany	Giuseppe Ros; Italy
Heavyweight (>81 kg)	Joe Frazier; United States	Hans Huber; United Team of Germany	Vadim Yemelyanov; Soviet Union

== Medal table ==
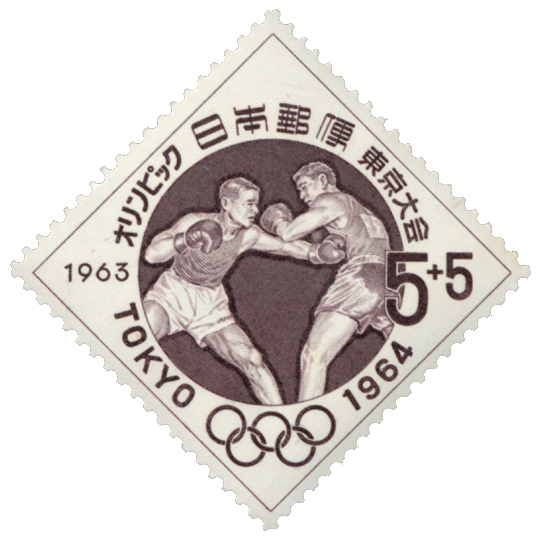
Boxing at the 1964 Summer Olympics on a stamp of Japan

Rank	Nation	Gold	Silver	Bronze	Total
1	Soviet Union	3	4	2	9
2	Poland	3	1	3	7
3	Italy	2	0	3	5
4	United States	1	0	3	4
5	Japan	1	0	0	1
6	United Team of Germany	0	2	1	3
7	France	0	1	0	1
7	Philippines	0	1	0	1
7	South Korea	0	1	0	1
10	Bulgaria	0	0	1	1
10	Finland	0	0	1	1
10	Ghana	0	0	1	1
10	Ireland	0	0	1	1
10	Mexico	0	0	1	1
10	Nigeria	0	0	1	1
10	Tunisia	0	0	1	1
10	Uruguay	0	0	1	1
Totals (17 entries)		10	10	20	40
