= Boxing at the 1964 Summer Olympics – Bantamweight =

Boxing competitions

The bantamweight class in the boxing at the 1964 Summer Olympics competition was the second-lightest class. Bantamweights were limited to those boxers weighing less than 54 kilograms. The competition was held from October 11, 1964, to October 23, 1964. 32 boxers from 32 nations competed.

== Medallists ==
Gold	Silver	Bronze
Takao Sakurai (JPN)	Chung Shin-Cho (KOR)	Washington Rodríguez (URU) Juan Fabila Mendoza (MEX)

== Results ==
Round of 32; October 11
Farag (EGY)	0
Chung (KOR)	5
Rafter (IRL)	0
Almarez (ARG)	5
Booth (AUS)	RSC
Espinosa (CUB)	W
Torrevillas (PHI)	W
Karvonen (FIN)	RSC
Law (HKG)	W
Senin (ESP)	RSC
Fabila (MEX)	3
Ali-Akbarzadeh (IRI)	2
Török (HUN)	RSC
Grigoryev (URS)	W
Mitsev (BUL)	2
Zurlo (ITA)	3
Rodríguez (URU)	5
Ek (CAM)	0
Šlajs (TCH)	5
Lee (ROC)	0
Poser (EUA)	2
Bendig (POL)	3
Young (NGR)	5
Udompaichitkul (THA)	0
Aryee (GHA)	KO
Myint (BIR)	L
Sakurai (JPN)	4
Packer (GBR)	1
van der Walt (NRH)	RSC
Puiu (ROU)	W
Johnson (USA)	5
Huppen (NED)	0

Round of 16; October 16
Chung (KOR)	3
Almarez (ARG)	2
Espinosa (CUB)	4
Torrevillas (PHI)	1
Law (HKG)	0
Fabila (MEX)	5
Grigoryev (URS)	5
Zurlo (ITA)	0
Rodríguez (URU)	W
Šlajs (TCH)	RSC
Bendig (POL)	2
Young (NGR)	3
Aryee (GHA)	0
Sakurai (JPN)	5
Puiu (ROU)	5
Johnson (USA)	0

Quarterfinals; October 19
Chung (KOR)	W
Espinosa (CUB)	DNS
Fabila (MEX)	3
Grigoryev (URS)	2
Rodríguez (URU)	4
Young (NGR)	1
Sakurai (JPN)	5
Puiu (ROU)	0

Semifinals; October 21
Chung (KOR)	4
Fabila (MEX)	1
Rodríguez (URU)	0
Sakurai (JPN)	5

Final; October 23
Chung (KOR)	RSC
Sakurai (JPN)	W

== Sources ==
- Tokyo Organizing Committee (1964). The Games of the XVIII Olympiad: Tokyo 1964. Vol. 2.
