= Boxing at the 1963 Mediterranean Games =

Boxing competition

- Location: Naples, Italy
- Dates: 23–29 September 1963

The boxing events of the 1963 Mediterranean Games were held in Naples, Italy.

== Medalists ==
Event	Gold	Silver	Bronze
Flyweight (–51 kg)	Fernando Atzori (ITA)	Branislav Mirković (YUG)	Mahmoud Mersal (EGY) Aomar Rayam (MAR)
Bantamweight (–54 kg)	Franco Zurlo (ITA)	Elsayed Abdelnabi (EGY)	Houcine Ben Abes (MAR) Branko Petrić (YUG)
Featherweight (–57 kg)	Giovanni Girgenti (ITA)	Badawi El-Bedewi (EGY)	Zvonimir Vujin (YUG) Valentin Loren (ESP)
Lightweight (–60 kg)	Giuseppe Sabri (ITA)	Fawzi Hassan (EGY)	Lakhdar Ben Ahmed (TUN) Domingo Barrera (ESP)
Light Welterweight (–63.5 kg)	Bruno Arcari (ITA)	Habib Galhia (TUN)	Ibrahim Maharan (EGY) Kemal Yalçınkaya (TUR)
Welterweight (–67 kg)	Silvano Bertini (ITA)	Hussein Saddik (EGY)	İlhami Evrensel (TUR) Jean-Claude Leblois (FRA)
Light Middleweight (–71 kg)	Sayed El-Nahas (EGY)	Vlado Vranješević (YUG)	Remo Golfarini (ITA) Salah Ben Bouchaib (MAR)
Middleweight (–75 kg)	Ahmed Hassan (EGY)	Giovanni Perri (ITA)	Tawakalna Amin (SYR) Mustapha Ben Lahbib (MAR)
Light Heavyweight (–81 kg)	Cosimo Pinto (ITA)	Cosimo Bruno (FRA)	Dimitrios Kyrazis (GRE) Francisco San Jose Perez (ESP)
Heavyweight (+81 kg)	Dante Canè (ITA)	Sayed el-Kilany (EGY)	No bronze awarded

== Medal table ==
Rank	Nation	Gold	Silver	Bronze	Total
1	Italy (ITA)	8	1	1	10
2	United Arab Republic (UAR)	2	5	2	9
3	Yugoslavia (YUG)	0	2	2	4
4	France (FRA)	0	1	1	2
4	Tunisia (TUN)	0	1	1	2
6	Morocco (MAR)	0	0	4	4
7	Spain (ESP)	0	0	3	3
8	Turkey (TUR)	0	0	2	2
9	Greece (GRE)	0	0	1	1
9	Syria (SYR)	0	0	1	1
Totals (10 entries)		10	10	18	38
