= Deaths in September 2004 =

The following is a list of notable deaths in September 2004.

Entries for each day are listed alphabetically by surname. A typical entry lists information in the following sequence:

- Name, age, country of citizenship at birth, subsequent country of citizenship (if applicable), reason for notability, cause of death (if known), and reference.

== September 2004 ==
=== 1 ===
- Kenneth Keith, Baron Keith of Castleacre, 88, British life peer and chairman of Rolls-Royce, Beecham Group, and STC.
- Delkash, 80, Iranian singer and actress.
- Kaye Elhardt, 69, American television actress.
- Herbert Haft, 84, American pharmacists and businessman, congestive heart failure.
- Ahmed Kuftaro, 89, Syrian Grand Mufti, heart attack.
- Alan Stewart, 86, New Zealand educator and university administrator.

=== 2 ===
- Tom Capone, 38, Brazilian music producer and guitar player, traffic collision.
- Billy Davis, 72, American songwriter, record producer, and commercial jingle writer (I'd Like to Buy the World a Coke).
- Frederick Desrosiers, 64, Canadian Olympic boxer (1964).
- Kieth Engen, 79, American operatic bass singer.
- Bob O. Evans, 77, American computer scientist.
- Wilhelm Koch-Hooge, 88, German actor.
- Donald Leslie, 93, American audio engineer and inventor of the Leslie speaker.
- Francesco Mander, 88, Italian conductor and composer.
- Joan Oró, 80, Spanish biochemist.
- Vonda Phelps, 89, American child stage actress, vaudeville performer and dancer.
- Marcel Rewenig, 83, Luxembourgian footballer and Olympian (1948).
- Paul Shmyr, 58, Canadian NHL hockey player, throat cancer.
- Rose Slivka, 85, American writer, critic and editor.
- Eleni Zafeiriou, 88, Greek film actress.

=== 3 ===
- Archer Blood, 81, American career diplomat and academic.
- Yanis Kanidis, 74, Russian physical education teacher, killed by Chechen extremists.
- Robert McCleave, 81, Canadian politician, member of the House of Commons of Canada (1957-1963, 1965-1977).
- André Stil, 83, French novelist, short story writer, occasional poet, and political activist.
- Frenchy Uhalt, 94, American baseball player (Chicago White Sox).

=== 4 ===
- George Baird, 97, American sprinter and Olympian (1928).
- Samira Bellil, 31, French feminist activist, campaigner for Muslim girls'- and women's rights, stomach cancer.
- Walter Campbell, 83, Australian judge, administrator and governor.
- Mick Craigie, 87, Australian rugby league footballer.
- Alphonso Ford, 33, American basketball player (Mississippi Valley State Delta Devils, Seattle Supersonics, Philadelphia 76ers), leukemia.
- Serge Marquand, 74, French actor, leukemia.
- Moe Norman, 75, Canadian PGA and Canadian Tour golfer, congestive heart failure.
- James O. Page, 68, American chief of Emergency Medical Services, heart attack.

=== 5 ===
- Winston Anglin, 42, Jamaican football player, traffic collision.
- Red Cochran, 82, American gridiron football player (Chicago Cardinals), and later NFL scout.
- Allan Koury, 73, Canadian politician, member of the House of Commons of Canada (1988-1993).
- Pedro Listur, 82, Uruguayan Olympic high jumper (1948).
- Gerald Merrithew, 73, Canadian politician and federal cabinet minister, cancer.
- Gerard Piel, 89, American science writer and editor (Scientific American), stroke.

=== 6 ===
- Antonio Corpora, 95, Tunisian-Italian painter.
- Don Estes, 65, American football player (LSU Tigers, San Diego Chargers).
- Netzahualcóyotl de la Vega, 73, Mexican trade union leader and politician.
- Morey Leonard Sear, 75, American judge (United States district judge of the United States District Court for the Eastern District of Louisiana).
- Harvey Wheeler, 85, American political scientist and author (Fail-Safe), cancer.

=== 7 ===
- Ashfaq Ahmad, 79, Pakistani writer, playwright and broadcaster, gallbladder cancer.
- Bob Boyd, 84, American Major League Baseball player, first black player to sign with the Chicago White Sox.
- Lev Burchalkin, 65, Soviet football player and Russian coach.
- Kirk Fordice, 70, American politician, first Republican governor of Mississippi since 1874, leukemia.
- Fritha Goodey, 31, British actress (About a Boy), suicide by stabbing.
- Seppo Irjala, 66, Finnish Olympic sports shooter (1972).
- György Nagy, 77, Hungarian Olympic basketball player (1948).
- Beyers Naudé, 89, South African theologian and anti-apartheid activist.
- Miriam Pires, 78, Brazilian actress, toxoplasmosis.
- Gong Qiuxia, 85, Chinese actress and singer.
- Hal Reniff, 66, American baseball player (New York Yankees, New York Mets).
- Munir Said Thalib, 38, Indonesian human rights activist, arsenic poisoning.
- L.E. White, 74, American Grammy Award-winning songwriter, singer and musician.

=== 8 ===
- John F. Bolt, 83, United States Marine Corps flying ace during World War II and the Korean War.
- Patti Bright, 63, American Olympic volleyball player (1964, 1968).
- Francis Burt, 86, Australian jurist.
- Richard Girnt Butler, 86, American white supremacist, founder of the Aryan Nations, heart failure.
- Matías Prats Cañete, 90, Spanish radio and television journalist, kidney disease.
- Mohammad Jusuf, 76, Indonesian military general.
- Raymond Marcellin, 90, French politician, Minister of the Interior (1968–1974).
- Bror Mellberg, 80, Swedish football player.
- Tsutomu Mizukami, 85, Japanese writer of novels, biographies, and plays.
- Dan Spătaru, 64, Romanian singer, heart attack.
- Manuel María Fernández Teixeiro, 74, Spanish poet and academic.
- Frank Thomas, 92, American animator (Cinderella, Bambi, Lady and the Tramp), cerebral hemorrhage.
- Kuno Werner, 79, German Olympic skier (1956, 1960).
- James Westphal, 74, American scientist, engineer, and astronomer.

=== 9 ===
- Luis Advis, 69, Chilean professor of philosophy and music composer.
- Ernie Ball, 74, American guitar equipment maker.
- Aleksei Barkalov, 58, Ukrainian water polo player and Olympic champion (1968, 1972, 1976, 1980).
- Caitlin Clarke, 52, American theater and film actress, ovarian cancer.
- Rose Gacioch, 89, American baseball player.
- Ralph Hawkins, 69, American football coach, dementia.
- Jean-Daniel Pollet, 68, French film director and screenwriter.

=== 10 ===
- Brock Adams, 77, American politician, Parkinson's disease.
- Hussein Badreddin al-Houthi, 45, Yemeni islamist, politician and military leader, killed in action.
- Juraj Beneš, 64, Slovak composer, teacher, and pianist.
- Leonard Birchall, 89, Canadian Air Force officer.
- Richard Karlan, 85, American actor.
- Ken Meuleman, 81, Australian cricket player.
- Glyn Owen, 76, British actor (Emergency – Ward 10, Howards' Way), cancer.
- Andrea Wonfor, 60, British television executive and producer.

=== 11 ===
- Patriarch Peter VII of Alexandria, 55, Greek Orthodox Patriarch of Alexandria (since 1997), helicopter crash.
- Aaron Director, 102, Russian-American economist and academic.
- Fred Ebb, 71, American Broadway lyricist (Cabaret, Chicago), heart attack.
- Mohamed El-Minabawi, 77, Egyptian Olympic boxer (1948, 1952).
- Nectarios Kellis, Australian Greek Orthodox prelate, Greek Orthodox Bishop of Madagascar (since 1997), helicopter crash.
- Margaret Kelly, 94, Irish dancer and founder of the Bluebell Girls.
- Johnny Maloney, 72, British Olympic boxer (1952).
- David Mann, 64, American graphic artist.

=== 12 ===
- Max Abramovitz, 96, American architect.
- Ahmed Dini Ahmed, 72, Djiboutian politician, prime minister (1977–1978).
- Kenny Buttrey, 59, American drummer and arranger, cancer.
- Jerome Chodorov, 93, American playwright (My Sister Eileen).
- Margaret Jeffery, 84, English swimmer and Olympian (1936).
- Ray Simons, 91, South African communist, anti-apartheid activist, and trade unionist.
- Jack Turner, 84, American racecar driver.
- Dr. Wagner, 68, Mexican professional wrestler, or Luchador, heart attack.

=== 13 ===
- Charlie Brandt, 47, American serial killer, suicide by hanging.
- Daniel Dean, 95, American Olympic long-distance runner (1932).
- Bill Glassco, 69, Canadian theatre director and producer.
- Luis E. Miramontes, 79, Mexican chemist.
- Glenn Presnell, 99, American gridiron football player (Detroit Lions) and coach.
- Eric Sams, 78, British musicologist and William Shakespeare scholar.
- Im Sang-jo, 74, South Korean Olympic cyclist (1952, 1956).

=== 14 ===
- Fernando Campos, 80, Chilean football midfielder.
- Dakar, 83, Peruvian actor.
- Reynaldo Guerra Garza, 89, American federal judge.
- Judith Keep, 60, American district judge (United States District Court for the Southern District of California).
- Rota Onorio, 84, Kiribati politician.
- Richard Pierce, 86, American historian and scholar.
- Giuni Russo, 53, Italian singer ("Un'estate al mare"), cancer.
- John Seymour, 90, British author and self-sufficiency advocate.
- Ove Sprogøe, 84, Danish actor.
- Mamoru Takuma, 40, Japanese mass murderer (Ikeda school massacre), executed.
- Mawade Wade, 76, Senegalese football manager.

=== 15 ===
- Nalda Bird, 77, American baseball player.
- Donald G. Brotzman, 82, American politician, member of the United States House of Representatives (1963-1965, 1967-1975).
- Bernard Gribble, 77, British film editor (Top Secret!, Death Wish, The Jokers).
- Johnny Ramone, 55, American guitarist (The Ramones), prostate cancer.
- Walter Stewart, 73, Canadian writer, editor and journalism educator, cancer.
- Daouda Malam Wanké, 58, Nigerien military and political leader.
- Austin Herbert Woolrych, 86, English historian.

=== 16 ===
- Virginia Hamilton Adair, 91, American poet.
- Izora Armstead, 62, American singer, one of the two members of The Weather Girls, heart failure.
- Michael Donaghy, 50, American poet and musician, brain haemorrhage.
- Ramón Gabilondo, 91, Spanish football player and manager.
- Claude Jaeger, 87, Swiss-French film producer and actor.
- Livio Maitan, 81, Italian trotskyist and a leader of the Fourth International.
- Lars Matton, 79, Swedish Olympic sailor (1948).
- Giovanni Raboni, 72, Italian poet, translator and literary critic.
- Dolly Rathebe, 76, South African singer and actress (Jim Comes To Jo'burg), stroke.

=== 17 ===
- Katharina Dalton, 87, British physician, pioneered research on premenstrual stress syndrome.
- Evi Rauer, 88, Estonian actress and television director.
- H. S. Rawail, 83, Indian filmmaker.
- Galina Rumiantseva, 77, Russian Soviet painter and graphic artist.
- Sudheer, Indian actor.

=== 18 ===
- Jim Barnett, 80, American professional wrestling promoter and executive, pneumonia.
- Norman Cantor, 74, Canadian-American medieval scholar.
- Fran Curran, 82, American basketball player (Notre Dame Fighting Irish, Rochester Royals).
- Kyohei Fujita, 83, Japanese glass artist.
- René Kunz, 93, Swiss Olympic hurdler (1936).
- Russ Meyer, 82, American filmmaker, pneumonia.
- Marvin Mitchelson, 76, American divorce lawyer to the stars, cancer.
- Klara Rumyanova, 74, Soviet and Russian actress and voice actress, breast cancer.
- Pål Sæthrang, 59, Norwegian footballer.

=== 19 ===
- Eddie Adams, 71, American photojournalist, ALS.
- Árpád Bogsch, 85, Hungarian-American international civil servant.
- Stanley Clarke, 71, British businessman and philanthropist, colorectal cancer.
- Skeeter Davis, 72, American country music singer ("The End of the World", "I Can't Stay Mad at You"), breast cancer.
- Annabella Incontrera, 61, Italian actress (The Assassination Bureau, Black Belly of the Tarantula, The Case of the Bloody Iris).
- Waldren "Frog" Joseph, 86, American jazz trombone player.
- Damayanti Joshi, 76, Indian kathak dancer.
- Robert Lawrence, 90, Canadian film editor (Spartacus, El Cid, Fiddler on the Roof).
- Pat McHugh, 84, American football player (Georgia Tech Yellow Jackets, Philadelphia Eagles).
- Ryhor Reles, 91, Belarusian Yiddish writer.
- Derald Ruttenberg, 88, American investor and industrialist.
- Kenneth Sandford, 80, English singer and actor (D'Oyly Carte Opera Company).
- Line Østvold, 25, Norwegian snowboarder, snowboarding accident.

=== 20 ===
- Otto Beyeler, 78, Swiss Olympic cross-country skier (1952).
- Harry Burrus, 83, American football player (New York Yankees, Chicago Cardinals, Brooklyn Dodgers).
- Brian Clough, 69, English footballer, coach and manager, stomach cancer.
- Salil Dutta, 72, Indian Bengali director, screenwriter and actor.
- Pat Hanly, 72, New Zealand painter, Huntington's disease.
- Townsend Hoopes, 82, American historian and government official, melanoma.
- Štěpánka Mertová, 73, Czech Olympic discus thrower (1956, 1960).
- Kalmer Tennosaar, 75, Estonian singer and television journalist.

=== 21 ===
- Alan Beaumont, 69, Australian admiral, chief of Australian Defence Forces.
- Jean-Pierre Drivet, 62, French Olympic rower (1964, 1968).
- Jack Hensley, 48, American civilian contractor, beheaded by Muslim terrorists in Iraq.
- Bob Mason, 53, British actor and writer, esophageal cancer.
- David Pall, 90, Canadian-American chemist, invented sophisticated filters used in blood transfusions, Alzheimer's disease.
- Larry Phillips, 62, American stock car racer.

=== 22 ===
- Edward Larrabee Barnes, 89, American architect.
- Cy Block, 85, American baseball player (Chicago Cubs), Alzheimer's disease.
- Winston Cenac, 79, Saint Lucian civil servant and politician.
- Big Boss Man, 41, American professional wrestler, heart attack.
- Yekaterina Parlyuk, 69, Soviet Russian middle-distance runner and Olympian (1960).
- Pete Schoening, 77, American mountaineer, cancer.
- Alex Wayman, 83, American tibetologist and indologist.
- Harry Zeller, 85, American basketball player (Pittsburgh Panthers, Pittsburgh Ironmen).

=== 23 ===
- Richard S. Arnold, 68, American judge.
- Bryce DeWitt, 81, American theoretical physicist, pancreatic cancer.
- Roy Drusky, 74, American country music singer and Grand Ole Opry star, lung cancer.
- André Hazes, 53, Dutch folk singer, heart failure.
- Lucille Lisle, 96, Australian actress.
- Dominic Montserrat, 40, British egyptologist and papyrologist.
- Nigel Nicolson, 89, British politician.
- Bülent Oran, 80, Turkish screenwriter and actor.
- Billy Reay, 86, Canadian ice hockey player and coach (Chicago Black Hawks), liver cancer.
- Margaret Sloan-Hunter, 57, American feminist and civil rights advocate.
- Dido Sotiriou, 95, Greek novelist, journalist, and playwright, pneumonia.

=== 24 ===
- Tim Choate, 49, American actor (Babylon 5), motorcycle accident.
- Raja Ramanna, 79, Indian nuclear scientist and father of India's nuclear program.
- Françoise Sagan, 69, French novelist and playwright, pulmonary embolism.
- Roman Tsepov, 42, Russian businessman and confidant to Vladimir Putin, poisoned.
- Ron Willey, 74, Australian rugby player and coach.

=== 25 ===
- Ma Chengyuan, 76, Chinese archaeologist, president of Shanghai Museum, suicide.
- Michael Davies, 68, British writer on Roman Catholicism, cancer.
- Nigel Davies, 84, British anthropologist and historian.
- Marvin Davis, 79, American industrialist and philanthropist, owned Twentieth Century Fox and Pebble Beach.
- Alain Glavieux, 55, French mathematician and information technology pioneer.
- Heinz Günther Guderian, 90, German Wehrmacht officer and Bundeswehr general after World War II.
- Robert C. James, 86, American mathematician.
- Frank King, 75, Canadian ice hockey player (Montreal Canadiens).
- Arun Kolatkar, 71, Indian poet.
- Robert Mitinger, 64, American football player (Penn State Nittany Lions, San Diego Chargers).
- Giorgio Moser, 80, Italian film director and screenwriter.

=== 26 ===
- Víctor Cruz, 46, Dominican baseball player (Toronto Blue Jays, Cleveland Indians, Pittsburgh Pirates, Texas Rangers), liver problems.
- Amjad Farooqi, 32, Pakistani terrorist, supposed member of Al-Qaida, killed by Pakistani security forces.
- Einar Førde, 61, Norwegian journalist and politician of the Labour Party, cancer.
- Natik Hashim, 44, Iraqi football midfielder and Olympian (1984, 1988), heart attack.
- Marianna Komlos, 35, Canadian bodybuilder, fitness model and professional wrestler, breast cancer.

=== 27 ===
- Gerald Cobbe, 77, Canadian politician, member of the House of Commons of Canada (1968-1972).
- Amanda Crowe, 76, American Cherokee woodcarver and educator.
- Shobha Gurtu, 79, Indian singer.
- Pieter Jan Leeuwerink, 42, Dutch Olympic volleyball player (1988).
- John Edward Mack, 74, American psychiatrist and writer, killed by a drunken driver.
- Louis Satterfield, 67, American bass and trombone player.
- Vittorio Sentimenti, 86, Italian football player.
- Dick Stenberg, 83, Swedish Air Force lieutenant general.
- Bernard Slicher van Bath, 94, Dutch social historian.
- Tsai Wan-lin, 80, Taiwanese billionaire businessman, cardiovascular disease.

=== 28 ===
- Thea Altaras, 80, Croatian-German architect.
- Luigi Amerio, 92, Italian electrical engineer and mathematician.
- Mulk Raj Anand, 98, Indian author, pneumonia.
- Geoffrey Beene, 77, American fashion designer, pneumonia.
- Carl Berntsen, 91, Danish Olympic sailor (1936).
- Christl Cranz, 90, German alpine ski racer and Olympian (1936).
- Geo Dumitrescu, 84, Romanian poet and translator.
- Willis Hawkins, 90, American aeronautical engineer and director (Lockheed).
- Scott Muni, 74, American radio disc jockey.
- Viktor Rozov, 91, Soviet and Russian dramatist and screenwriter.
- J. H. van Lint, 72, Dutch mathematician, professor and university president.

=== 29 ===
- Balamani Amma, 95, Indian poet, Alzheimer's disease.
- Ernst van der Beugel, 86, Dutch economist, businessman, diplomat and politician.
- Alphonse Dunn, 93, American baseball player.
- Gertrude Dunn, 70, American baseball player.
- FannyAnn Eddy, 30, Sierra Leonean LGBT activist, stabbed.
- Christopher Hancock, 76, British television and theatre actor, heart attack.
- James Henniger, 50, Canadian Olympic rower (1976).
- Cornelio Heredia, 83, Peruvian footballer.
- David Jackson, 49, New Zealand boxer and Olympian (1976).
- José López, 92, Argentine Olympic cyclist (1928).
- Christer Pettersson, 57, Swedish criminal, suspected murderer of prime minister Olof Palme, cerebral hemorrhage.
- Richard Sainct, 34, French rally motorcyclist, racing accident.
- Thure von Uexküll, 96, German scholar of psychosomatic medicine and biosemiotics.
- Heinz Wallberg, 81, German conductor.
- Antje Weisgerber, 82, German film and television actress, and wife of actor Horst Caspar.
- Shimon Wincelberg, (aka S. Bar David), 80, American television writer.
- Patrick Wormald, 57, British historian.

=== 30 ===
- Hércules Azcune, 80, Uruguayan athlete and Olympian (1948, 1952).
- William G. Cambridge, 72, American district judge (United States District Court for the District of Nebraska).
- Isabel Freire de Matos, 89, Puerto Rican writer, educator, and journalist.
- Gamini Fonseka, 68, Sri Lankan actor and politician, heart attack.
- Jacques Levy, 69, American songwriter, theatre director and clinical psychologist.
- Mathias Matthies, 93, German art director.
- Mildred McDaniel, 70, American high jumper and Olympic champion (1956), cancer.
- Willem Oltmans, 79, Dutch investigative journalist and author, cancer.
- Michael Relph, 89, English film producer, art director and film director (nominated for Academy Award for Best Production Design for Saraband).
- Shivaji, 47, Indian actor.
- Gustavo Somohano, 79, Mexican Olympic diver (1948).
- Justin Strzelczyk, 36, American gridiron football player (Pittsburgh Steelers), car crash while leading police on chase.
- Ignatius Wolfington, 84, American character actor.
