= Boxing at the 1965 SEAP Games =

Boxing at the 1965 Southeast Asian Peninsular Games
- Venue: Chin Woo Stadium
- Date: 15–17 December
- Competitors: 36 from 6 nations

Boxing is one of the 12 sports featured in the 1965 Southeast Asian Peninsular Games. The tournament was held from 15 to 17 December 1965 at Chin Woo Stadium in Kuala Lumpur, Malaysia.

Each nation can enter one competitor only for each weight category. Six nations participated, including the host country Malaysia and Thailand, which entered in all categories.

== Participating countries ==
- Burma
- Cambodia
- Malaysia (Host)
- Singapore
- Thailand
- South Vietnam

== Medal table ==
* Host nation (Malaysia)

Rank	Nation	Gold	Silver	Bronze	Total
1	Thailand (THA)	3	4	2	9
2	Cambodia (CAM)	3	1	1	5
3	Burma (BIR)	2	1	1	4
4	Malaysia (MAS)*	1	2	6	9
5	Singapore (SIN)	0	1	4	5
6	South Vietnam (VNM)	0	0	0	0
Totals (6 entries)		9	9	14	32

== Medalists ==
Event	Gold	Silver	Bronze
Light flyweight (48 kg)	Prapan Duangchaoom; Thailand	Kyaw Shein; Burma	Ariffin Junid; Singapore
Light flyweight (48 kg)	Prapan Duangchaoom; Thailand	Kyaw Shein; Burma	T. Trenas; Malaysia
Flyweight (51 kg)	Tawat Visantanat; Thailand	Ahmad Mokhtar; Malaysia	Kyaw Aye; Burma
Flyweight (51 kg)	Tawat Visantanat; Thailand	Ahmad Mokhtar; Malaysia	Jumaat Ibrahim; Singapore
Bantamweight (54 kg)	Ni Ni; Burma	Nee Roath Virabhak; Singapore	Cherdchai Udompaichitkul; Thailand
Bantamweight (54 kg)	Ni Ni; Burma	Nee Roath Virabhak; Singapore	Raja Zainal Abidin; Malaysia
Featherweight (57 kg)	Tin Tun; Burma	Neou Pheng; Cambodia	Wan Hassan; Malaysia
Featherweight (57 kg)	Tin Tun; Burma	Neou Pheng; Cambodia	Lamyong; Thailand
Lightweight (60 kg)	Soth Sun; Cambodia	Amnuay Phodisawat; Thailand	George Beins; Singapore
Lightweight (60 kg)	Soth Sun; Cambodia	Amnuay Phodisawat; Thailand	Wong Chin Kong; Malaysia
Light welterweight (63.5 kg)	Khieu Soeun; Cambodia	Niyom Prasertsom; Thailand	Koay Siew Chiew; Malaysia
Light welterweight (63.5 kg)	Khieu Soeun; Cambodia	Niyom Prasertsom; Thailand	Melvyn Hoeden; Singapore
Welterweight (67 kg)	Terence Stahlmann; Malaysia	Virat Vilarlak; Thailand	Oum Kim Lee; Cambodia
Light middleweight (71 kg)	Touch Noi; Cambodia	Yot Sangthien; Thailand	Sahim; Malaysia
Middleweight (75 kg)	Chaliew Chandramanee; Thailand	Ismail Hussain; Malaysia	—N/a

== Results ==
=== Light flyweight (48 kg) ===
Semifinals
Prapan Duangchaoom (THA)	PTS
Ariffin Junid (SIN)
Kyaw Shein (BIR)	DSQ R3
T. Trenas (MAS)

Final
Prapan Duangchaoom (THA)	PTS
Kyaw Shein (BIR)

=== Flyweight (51 kg) ===
Quarterfinals
Tawat Visantanat (THA)	RSC R1
Ngo Van Ho (VNM)
Kyaw Aye (BIR)	PTS
Khong Kim Sin (CAM)

Semifinals
Tawat Visantanat (THA)	PTS
Kyaw Aye (BIR)
Ahmad Mokhtar (MAS)	PTS
Jumaat Ibrahim (SIN)

Final
Tawat Visantanat (THA)	KO R1
Ahmad Mokhtar (MAS)

=== Bantamweight (54 kg) ===
Quarterfinals
Ni Ni (BIR)	RSC R2
Ngufen (VNM)
Cherdchai Udompaichitkul (THA)	PTS
Ek Sam An (CAM)

Semifinals
Ni Ni (BIR)	W
Cherdchai Udompaichitkul (THA)
Nee Roath Virabhak (SIN)	PTS
Raja Zainal Abidin (MAS)

Final
Ni Ni (BIR)	RSC R3
Nee Roath Virabhak (SIN)

=== Featherweight (57 kg) ===
Semifinals
Tin Tun (BIR)	W
Wan Hassan (MAS)
Neou Pheng (CAM)	W
Lamyong (THA)

Final
Tin Tun (BIR)	PTS
Neou Pheng (CAM)

=== Lightweight (60 kg) ===
Semifinals
Soth Sun (CAM)	W
George Beins (SIN)
Amnuay Phodisawat (THA)	RSC R2
Wong Chin Kong (MAS)

Final
Soth Sun (CAM)	PTS
Amnuay Phodisawat (THA)

=== Light welterweight (63.5 kg) ===
Semifinals
Khieu Soeun (CAM)	RSC R1
Koay Siew Chiew (MAS)
Niyom Prasertsom (THA)	KO R1
Melvyn Hoeden (SIN)

Final
Khieu Soeun (CAM)	PTS
Niyom Prasertsom (THA)

=== Welterweight (67 kg) ===
Semifinals
Virat Vilarlak (THA)	PTS
Oum Kim Lee (CAM)

Final
Terence Stahlmann (MAS)	DSQ R1
Virat Vilarlak (THA)

=== Light middleweight (71 kg) ===
Semifinals
Touch Noi (CAM)	PTS
Sahim (MAS)

Final
Yot Sangthien (THA)
Touch Noi (CAM)	PTS

=== Middleweight (75 kg) ===
Final
Chaliew Chandramanee (THA)	KO R1
Ismail Hussain (MAS)
