= Boxing at the 1964 Summer Olympics – Featherweight =

Boxing competitions

Men's Featherweight at the Games of the XVIII Olympiad
- Venue: Korakuen Ice Palace
- Dates: 13 – 23 October 1964
- Competitors: 32 from 32 nations

Medalists
1st place, gold medalist(s)		Stanislav Stepashkin	Soviet Union
2nd place, silver medalist(s)		Anthony Villanueva	Philippines
3rd place, bronze medalist(s)		Charles Brown	United States
3rd place, bronze medalist(s)		Heinz Schulz	United Team of Germany

The Featherweight class in the boxing at the 1964 Summer Olympics competition was the third-lightest class. Featherweights were limited to those boxers weighing less than 57 kilograms. The competition was held from 13 and 23 October 1964 at Korakuen Ice Palace. 32 boxers from 32 nations competed.

Stanislav Stepashkin from the Soviet Union won the gold medal after defeating Filipino Anthony Villanueva in the final bout, who won the silver medal. The losing semifinalists, Charles Brown from the United States and Heinz Schulz representing the United Team of Germany, both received bronze medals.

In his first round bout, Spanish boxer Valentín Loren punched a Hungarian referee in the face after being disqualified; he was banned for life from international competition.

== Schedule ==
Date	Round
13 October 1964	First round
17 October 1964	Second round
20 October 1964	Quarterfinals
21 October 1964	Semifinals
23 October 1964	Final

== Results ==
=== Finals ===
Semifinals
Charles Brown (USA)	1
Anthony Villanueva (PHI)	4
Heinz Schulz (EUA)	L
Stanislav Stepashkin (URS)	KO

Final
Anthony Villanueva (PHI)	2
Stanislav Stepashkin (URS)	3

=== Top half ===
Round of 32
Charles Brown (USA)	5
Randall Hope (AUS)	0
Khieu Soeun (CAM)	W
Hugo Martínez (ARG)	RSC
José Antonio Durán (MEX)	5
Youssef Anwer (IRQ)	0
Seok Jong-gu (KOR)	W
Mario Molina (CHI)	DSQ
Masataka Takayama (JPN)	5
Ian McLoughlin (NRH)	0
Pat Fitzsimmons (IRL)	0
Piotr Gutman (POL)	5
Anthony Villanueva (PHI)	3
Giovanni Girgenti (ITA)	2
Peter Weiss (AUT)	2
Tahar Ben Hassen (TUN)	3

Round of 16
Charles Brown (USA)	4
Khieu Soeun (CAM)	1
José Antonio Durán (MEX)	4
Seok Jong-gu (KOR)	1
Masataka Takayama (JPN)	RSC
Piotr Gutman (POL)	W
Anthony Villanueva (PHI)	4
Tahar Ben Hassen (TUN)	1

Quarterfinals
Charles Brown (USA)	4
José Antonio Durán (MEX)	1
Piotr Gutman (POL)	RSC
Anthony Villanueva (PHI)	W

Semifinals
Charles Brown (USA)	1
Anthony Villanueva (PHI)	4

=== Bottom half ===
Round of 32
Anthony Andeh (NGR)	W
Badawi El-Bedewi (RAU)	RSC
Tin Tun (BIR)	W
Ronald Smith (GBR)	RSC
Bhim Bahadur Thapa (NEP)	0
Heinz Schulz (EUA)	5
Alfonso Frazer (PAN)	RSC
Philip Waruinge (KEN)	W
Jorma Limmonen (FIN)	W
Jan de Rooij (NED)	RSC
Constantin Crudu (ROU)	4
Roberto Caminero (CUB)	1
Stanislav Stepashkin (URS)	W
José Alonso Nieves (PUR)	RSC
Hsu Hung-cheng (ROC)	W
Valentín Loren (ESP)	DSQ

Round of 16
Anthony Andeh (NGR)	1
Tin Tun (BIR)	4
Heinz Schulz (EUA)	5
Philip Waruinge (KEN)	0
Jorma Limmonen (FIN)	2
Constantin Crudu (ROU)	3
Stanislav Stepashkin (URS)	W
Hsu Hung-cheng (ROC)	RSC

Quarterfinals
Tin Tun (BIR)	0
Heinz Schulz (EUA)	5
Constantin Crudu (ROU)	RSC
Stanislav Stepashkin (URS)	W

Semifinals
Heinz Schulz (EUA)	L
Stanislav Stepashkin (URS)	KO

== Sources ==
Tokyo Organizing Committee (1964). The Games of the XVIII Olympiad: Tokyo 1964, vol. 2.
