= Takao Sakurai =

Japanese boxer (1941–2012)

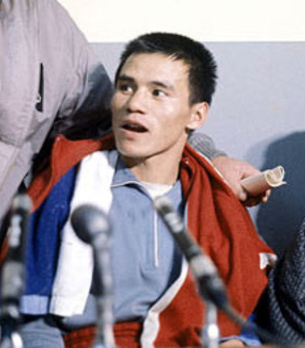
- Takao Sakurai at the 1964 Olympics

Personal information
- Born: September 25, 1941 Sawara, Chiba, Japan
- Died: January 10, 2012 (aged 70) Tokyo, Japan
- Height: 1.64 m (5 ft 5 in)
- Weight: 54 kg (119 lb)

Sport
- Sport: Boxing
Medal record
Representing Japan
Olympic Games
| Gold medal – first place | 1964 Tokyo | Bantamweight |

Takao Sakurai (桜井 孝雄, Sakurai Takao; September 25, 1941 – January 10, 2012) was a Japanese boxer who won a gold medal at the 1964 Olympics.

== Amateur career ==
Born in Sawara, Chiba, Sakurai began boxing in high school, keeping his training secret to his parents. Although there was no trainer in his high school, Sakurai won the Japan's inter-high school championship in the bantamweight division in 1960. Then he entered Chuo University, and won the All-Japan Amateur Boxing Championships in the bantamweight division in 1963. Sakurai captured the Olympic boxing gold medal at the 1964 Tokyo Olympics in his senior year. In the final versus Chung Shin-Cho of South Korea, he knocked down his opponent three times in less than two rounds. The referee stopped the contest. Sakurai became the first Japanese boxer to win Olympic gold, with Ryōta Murata winning the second Olympic gold in boxing for Japan in the middleweight division in the 2012 London Olympics. His career record in amateur competition was 138-13.

=== 1964 Olympic results ===
Below are the results of Takao Sakurai, a Japanese bantamweight boxer, who competed at the 1964 Tokyo Olympics:

- Defeated Brian Packer (Great Britain) on points, 4-1
- Defeated Cassis Aryee (Ghana) on points, 5-0
- Defeated Nicolae Puiu (Romania) on points, 5-0
- Defeated Washington Rodríguez (Uruguay) on points, 5-0
- Defeated Chung Shin-Cho (South Korea) referee stopped contest in second round (won gold medal)

== Professional career ==
Sakurai's feat in the Olympics heightened hopes for his professional career, and he made his professional debut from Misako Boxing Gym in March, 1965. He won 22 straight fights, but was unable to make a full transition from his cautious, amateur boxing style to a more aggressive, professional style. He could win only 4 fights by knockout out of his 32 professional fights.

Sakurai challenged Lionel Rose for the world bantamweight title on July 2, 1968. He got a knockdown in the 2nd round, but ended up losing by decision in 15 rounds. He suffered the first knockout loss of his career against Rubén Olivares in May 1969 in a non-title match. Later that year, he won the OPBF bantamweight title, which he defended twice before announcing his retirement in 1970. His professional record was 30-2-0 (4KOs), and he was the top-ranked world bantamweight contender when he retired.

== Post-retirement ==
Sakurai founded his own boxing gym One Two Sports Club, in Tsukiji, Chūō, Tokyo, and worked as a trainer there. He was the first man to practice Koichi Wajima's "Frog Jump" punch under the guidance of Hitoshi Misako who is the president of Misako Boxing Gym where he trained during his career as a boxer. His eldest son has also had a successful amateur boxing career, winning a national tournament in the featherweight division.

Sakurai died of esophageal cancer in Tokyo at dawn on January 10, 2012, the birthday of Hitoshi Misako.
