= Jaroslav Šlajs =

Czechoslovak boxer

Personal information
- Nationality: Czechoslovak
- Born: 14 March 1942 (age 83)

Sport
- Sport: Boxing

Jaroslav Šlajs (born 14 March 1942) is a Czechoslovak boxer. He competed in the men's bantamweight event at the 1964 Summer Olympics. At the 1964 Summer Olympics, he defeated Lee Chen-chu of Taiwan, before losing to Washington Rodríguez of Uruguay.
