= Marian Kasprzyk =

Polish boxer (1939–2026)

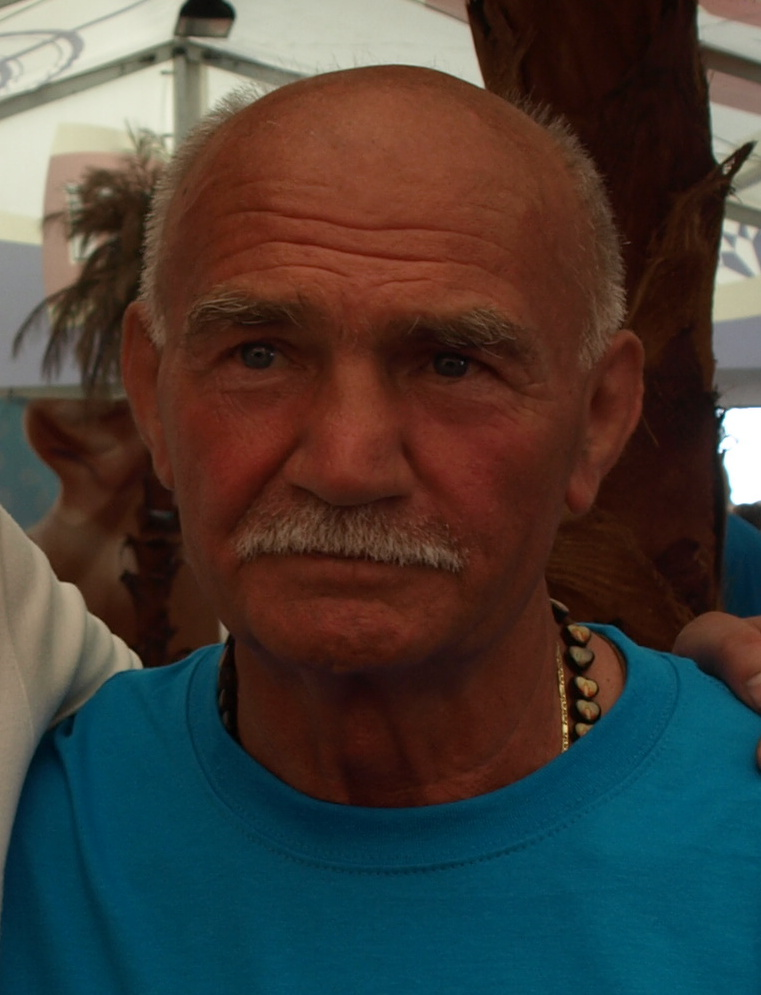
- Kasprzyk in 2012

Personal information
- Born: Marian Krzysztof Kasprzyk; 22 September 1939 Kołomań, Poland
- Died: 2 February 2026 (aged 86) Bielsko-Biała, Poland

Sport
- Sport: Boxing
Medal record
Representing Poland
Men's Boxing
Olympic Games
Gold medal – first place	1964 Tokyo	Welterweight
Bronze medal – third place	1960 Rome	Light Welterweight
European Amateur Championships
Bronze medal – third place	Belgrade 1961	Light Welterweight

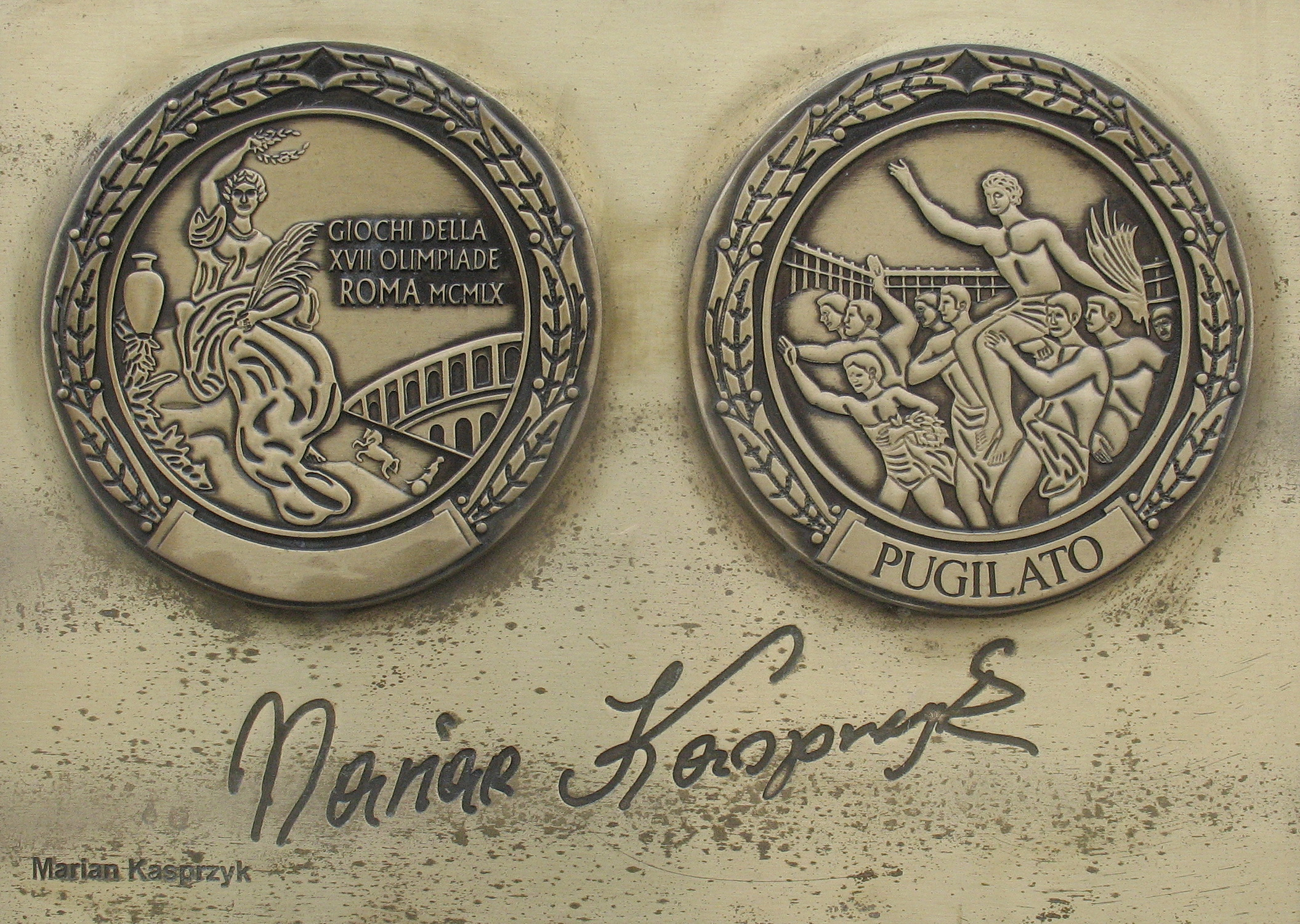
Copy of the medal and autograph of M. Kasprzyk in Avenue of Sport Stars in Dziwnów

Marian Krzysztof Kasprzyk (22 September 1939 – 2 February 2026) was a Polish welterweight boxer. He competed at three Olympic games, winning a gold and bronze medal.

== Biography ==
His biggest success was at the Olympic Games. In Rome, in 1960, he earned a bronze medal in light welterweight. In the quarterfinal, he overcame the titleholder Vladimir Jengibarian from the USSR. He was unable to take part in the semi-final fight because of a minor injury.

At the 1964 Olympic Games in Tokyo, he became an Olympic champion in welterweight. In the first round of the final fight, he broke his thumb, but he lasted to the end, overcoming the favourite of the competition, then double European champion, Ričardas Tamulis from the USSR.

In Mexico, at the 1968 games, he lost in the first round in light middleweight against American Armando Munizem. Later, he became a professional boxer, competing for the World Championship in light middleweight four times.

Kasprzyk started in the European Championship. In Belgrade in 1961, he won a bronze medal in light welterweight.

Competing in the Polish Championship in 1961, he won a bronze medal in light welterweight and was also a Polish vice-champion in 1970 in middleweight.

He represented Poland 9 times, winning 6, drawing 1 and losing twice.

In his boxing career, he fought 270 times in total, winning 232, drawing 10, and losing 28.

Between 1961 and 1964, Kasprzyk was disqualified (initially lifelong, then the punishment was eased) for being convicted of participation in a fight. The punishment was lifted shortly before the Olympic Games in Tokyo, which Kasprzyk attended and won after a stiff contest with Leszek Drogosz.

This part of his biography was made into a movie called "Boxer", directed by Julian Dziedzina, and based on a script by Bogdan Tomaszewski and Jerzy Suszko (1966). Daniel Olbrychski played in the main role.

He was an active sportsman between 1955 and 1976 for clubs like Sparta Ziębice, Nysa Kłodzko, and in time of his biggest success, he represented BBTS Bielsko-Biała, as well as Górnik Wesoła and Górnik Pszów. In 1999, he won an Aleksandra Rekszu award.

Kasprzyk died in Bielsko-Biała, Poland on 2 February 2026, at the age of 86.

== Amateur ==
Kasprzyk won the Welterweight gold medal at the 1964 Tokyo Olympic Games and the bronze medal at the 1960 Rome Olympics as a Light Welterweight.

== Olympic results ==
1964

- Defeated Misael Vilugrón (Chile) 3–2
- Defeated Sikuru Alimi (Nigeria) 5–0
- Defeated Kichijiro Hamada (Japan) 5–0
- Defeated Silvano Bertini (Italy) 3–2
- Defeated Ričardas Tamulis (Soviet Union) 4–1
