= Tamulis =

Tamulis is a surname. It originates from the same given name, which is a diminutive Christian name Tòmas, Tamõšius, Thomas.

Notable people with the surname include:

- Jonas Tamulis (born 1958), Lithuanian politician
- Justas Tamulis (born 1994), Lithuanian basketball player
- Kris Tamulis (born 1980), American golfer
- Ričardas Tamulis (1938–2008), Lithuanian boxer
- Vito Tamulis (1911–1974), American baseball player
