= Mario Molina (boxer) =

Chilean boxer (born 1944)

Personal information
- Born: 16 December 1944 (age 80) Santiago, Chile

Sport
- Sport: Boxing

Mario Molina (born 16 December 1944) is a Chilean boxer. He competed in the men's featherweight event at the 1964 Summer Olympics. At the 1964 Summer Olympics, he lost to Seok Jong-gu of South Korea.
