= Bishop of Madagascar =

The Bishop of Madagascar may refer to:

- Anglican Bishop of Madagascar
- Greek Orthodox Bishop of Madagascar
