= Anthony Andeh =

Nigerian boxer

Personal information
- Nationality: Nigerian
- Born: 16 August 1945; Mmaku, Nigeria
- Died: 12 May 2010 (aged 64)

Sport
- Sport: Boxing

Anthony Andeh (16 August 1945 – 12 May 2010) was a Nigerian boxer. He competed in the men's featherweight event at the 1964 Summer Olympics, and then won the gold medal in the lightweight event at the 1966 Commonwealth Games in Kingston, Jamaica. At the 1964 Summer Olympics, he defeated Badawi El-Bedewi of Egypt, before losing to Tin Tun of Burma.
