= Karimu Young =

Nigerian boxer

Personal information
- Nationality: Nigerian
- Born: 21 March 1942 (age 84) Ilorin, Nigeria

Sport
- Sport: Boxing

Karimu Young (born March 21, 1942) is a Nigerian boxer. He competed at the 1960 Summer Olympics and the 1964 Summer Olympics. At the 1964 Summer Olympics, he defeated Cherdchai Udompaichitkul and Brunon Bendig before losing to Washington Rodríguez.
