= Constantin Crudu =

Romanian boxer

Personal information
- Nationality: Romanian
- Born: 27 July 1944 (age 80); Bucharest, Romania

Sport
- Sport: Boxing

Constantin Crudu (born 27 July 1944) is a Romanian boxer. He competed in the men's featherweight event at the 1964 Summer Olympics. At the 1964 Summer Olympics, he defeated Roberto Caminero in the Round of 32 and Jorma Limmonen in the Round of 16, before losing to Stanislav Stepashkin in a quarterfinal.
