= Huppen =

Huppen is a surname. Notable people with the surname include:

- Hermann Huppen (1938–2026), Belgian comics artist and writer
- Jan Huppen (born 1942), Dutch boxer
