= Patrick Fitzsimons =

Patrick Fitzsimons may refer to:

- Patrick Fitzsimons (politician) (died 1982), Irish non-party politician
- Patrick Fitzsimons (bishop) (1695–1769), Irish Roman Catholic bishop

== See also ==
- Pat Fitzsimons, American golfer
- Pat Fitzsimmons, Irish boxer
