= Caminero =

Caminero is a surname. Notable people with the surname include:

- Arquimedes Caminero (born 1987), Dominican baseball player
- José Luis Caminero (born 1967), Spanish footballer
- Junior Caminero (born 2003), Dominican baseball player
- Roberto Caminero (1945–2010), Cuban boxer
- Wilfredo Caminero (born 1954), Filipino politician

== See also ==
- El Caminero (Mexico City Metrobús), a BRT station in Mexico City
