= Law Hon Pak =

Hong Kong boxer (1939–2021)

Personal information
- Full name: 羅漢北, Jyutping: lo4 hon3 bak1; Pinyin: Luó Hàn-běi
- Nationality: Hong Konger
- Born: July 14, 1939
- Died: July 7, 2021 (aged 81).

Sport
- Sport: Boxing

Law Hon Pak (Chinese: 羅漢北) (14 July 1939 – 7 July 2021) was a Hong Kong boxer. He competed in the men's bantamweight event at the 1964 Summer Olympics. At the 1964 Summer Olympics, he defeated Agustín Senin of Spain, before losing to Juan Fabila Mendoza of Mexico.
