= Khieu Soeun =

Cambodian boxer (born 1943)

Personal information
- Nationality: Cambodian
- Born: 7 September 1943 (age 83) Cambodia

Sport
- Sport: Boxing
Medal record
Representing Khmer Republic
Men's boxing
Asian Games
Silver medal – second place	1970 Bangkok	63.5 kg
Representing Cambodia
Men's boxing
SEAP Games
Gold medal – first place	1965 Kuala Lumpur	63.5 kg

Khieu Soeun (born 7 September 1943) is a Cambodian boxer. He competed in the men's featherweight event at the 1964 Summer Olympics and placed equal ninth, one of Cambodia's best placings at the Olympic Games. Among his other events were the 1965 SEAP Games, where he won the gold, and the 1970 Asian Games, where he won the silver and is Cambodia's best placing in an international event for the sport.

== Biography ==
Khieu Soeun was born on 7 September 1943 in Cambodia. As a boxer, he competed at the 1964 Summer Olympics held in Tokyo, Japan, in the men's featherweight event. In the first round, he went up against Hugo Martínez of Argentina on 13 October 1964, winning by knockout and advancing to round two. He then went up against eventual bronze medal winner Charles Brown of the United States four days later and lost by decision. As of the 2024 Summer Olympics, his equal ninth place finish remains as one of Cambodia's best placings at the Olympic Games.

Khieu was selected to compete for Cambodia at the 1965 SEAP Games held in Kuala Lumpur, Malaysia. There, he competed in the men's light welterweight event against three other boxers. His first round was on 15 December against Koay Siew Chiew of Malaysia, where Khieu won after the referee stopped contest in round 1. Two days later, he went up against Niyom Prasertsom of Thailand. Khieu won the bout through points and earned the gold medal for the event.

Five years later, Khieu, now representing the Khmer Republic, competed at the 1970 Asian Games held in Bangkok, Thailand. There, he won the silver medal. According to the Asian Boxing Confederation, his result in the Asian Games remains as Cambodia's best placing in an international event for boxing alongside Long Savoen who also won a silver medal at the same edition of the Games.
