= Cholchol Formation =

Geological formation composed of sediments

- Stratigraphic range: Middle–Upper Miocene
- Type: Geological formation
- Underlies: Pliocene and Pleistocene alluvial fans and volcaniclastic deposits
- Overlies: Bahía Mansa Metamorphic Complex; Coastal Batholith of central Chile; Mesozoic sediments
- Thickness: 150–200 m (490–660 ft)

Lithology
- Primary: Claystone, sandstone, tuff, calcarenite, calcirudite

Location
- Coordinates: 38.0°S 72.0°W
- Region: Araucanía Region
- Country: Chile

Type section
- Named for: Cholchol
- Named by: Floreal García
- Year defined: 1968
- Cholchol Formation (Chile)

Cholchol Formation (Spanish: Formación Cholchol) is a geological formation composed of sediments that were deposited during the Miocene in the Temuco Basin of south–central Chile. The sediments were deposited in a marine environment.
