= Sikiru Alimi =

Sikiru Alimi may refer to:

- Sikuru Alimi (born 1942), Nigerian boxer
- Sikiru Alimi (footballer), player in the 2023–24 Nigeria Premier Football League
