= José Alonso Nieves =

Puerto Rican boxer (1944–1979)

Personal information
- Nationality: Puerto Rican
- Born: 23 January 1944 Santurce, Puerto Rico
- Died: 1 November 1979 (aged 35) Bayamón, Puerto Rico

Sport
- Sport: Boxing

José Alonso Nieves (23 January 1944 – 1 November 1979) was a Puerto Rican boxer. He competed in the men's featherweight event at the 1964 Summer Olympics. At the 1964 Summer Olympics, he lost to Stanislav Stepashkin of the Soviet Union.
