= Lee Hong-man =

South Korean boxer (born 1941)

Personal information
- Nationality: South Korean
- Born: 25 January 1941 (age 84)

Sport
- Sport: Boxing

Lee Hong-man (born 25 January 1941) is a South Korean boxer. He competed in the men's welterweight event at the 1964 Summer Olympics. At the 1964 Summer Olympics, he lost to Michael Varley of Great Britain.
