= Piotr Gutman =

Polish boxer (born 1941)

Personal information
- Nationality: Polish
- Born: 30 June 1941 (age 85) Zabrze, Poland

Sport
- Sport: Boxing
Medal record
Men's amateur boxing
Representing Poland
European Amateur Championships
Silver medal – second place	1961 Belgrade	Middleweight

Piotr Gutman (born 30 June 1941) is a Polish boxer. He competed in the men's featherweight event at the 1964 Summer Olympics. At the 1964 Summer Olympics, he defeated Pat Fitzsimmons and Masataka Takayama before losing to Anthony Villanueva.
