= Ernest Mabwa =

Ugandan boxer

Personal information
- Nationality: Ugandan
- Born: 26 January 1941 (age 84)

Sport
- Sport: Boxing

Ernest Powell Mabwa (born 26 January 1941) is a Ugandan boxer. He competed in the men's welterweight event at the 1964 Summer Olympics. At the 1964 Summer Olympics, he defeated Maurice Frilot and Constantin Niculescu, before losing to Ričardas Tamulis.
