= Hosni Farag =

Egyptian boxer (1944–1984)

Personal information
- Nationality: Egyptian
- Born: 14 May 1944
- Died: February 1984 (aged 39); Jordan

Sport
- Sport: Boxing

Hosni Farag (14 May 1944 – February 1984) was an Egyptian boxer. He competed in the men's bantamweight event at the 1964 Summer Olympics. At the 1964 tournament, he lost to Chung Shin-cho of South Korea in the Round of 32.
