= Christopher Rafter =

Irish boxer

Personal information
- Nationality: Irish
- Born: 24 February 1935
- Died: 14 February 2010 (aged 74)

Sport
- Sport: Boxing

Christopher Rafter (24 February 1935 – 14 February 2010) was an Irish boxer. He competed in the men's bantamweight event at the 1964 Summer Olympics. At the 1964 Summer Olympics, he lost to Abel Almarez of Argentina.
