= Youssef Anwer =

Iranian boxer

Personal information
- Nationality: Iraqi
- Born: 25 August 1936 (age 88)

Sport
- Sport: Boxing

Youssef Anwer (born 25 August 1936) is an Iraqi boxer. He competed in the men's featherweight event at the 1964 Summer Olympics. At the 1964 Summer Olympics, he lost to José Antonio Duran of Mexico in the Round of 32.
