= Ronald Smith (boxer) =

British boxer

Personal information
- Nickname: Ronnie
- Nationality: British
- Born: Anthony Ronald Smith; 14 October 1944 Liverpool, England
- Died: 19 October 2011 (aged 67) Liverpool, England
- Weight: Featherweight

Boxing career

Ronald Anthony Smith (14 October 1944 – 19 October 2011) was a British boxer. He fought as Ronnie Smith and competed in the featherweight event at the 1964 Summer Olympics.

Smith won the 1964 Amateur Boxing Association British featherweight title, when boxing out of the Fisher ABC.

== 1964 Olympic results ==
Below is the record of Ronald smith, a British featherweight boxer who competed at the 1964 Tokyo Olympics:

- Round of 32: lost to Tim Tun (Burma) referee stopped contest
