= Constantin Niculescu =

Romanian boxer

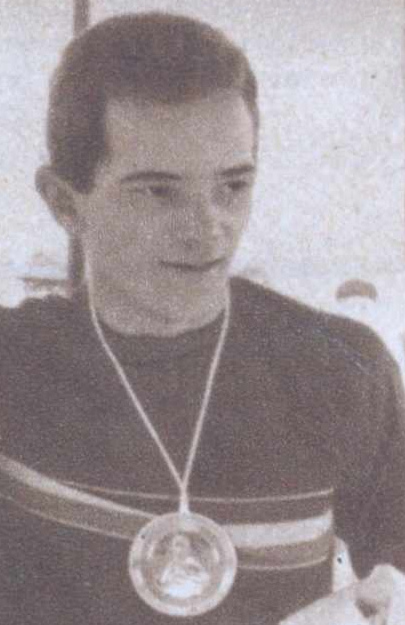
- Niculescu in 1963

Personal information
- Nationality: Romanian
- Born: 26 May 1944 (age 82) Urziceni, Romania

Sport
- Sport: Boxing

Constantin Niculescu (born 26 May 1944) is a Romanian boxer. He competed in the men's welterweight event at the 1964 Summer Olympics. At the 1964 Summer Olympics, he defeated Alfonso Ramírez of Mexico, before losing to Ernest Mabwa of Uganda.
