= Hugo Martínez (boxer) =

Argentine boxer

Personal information
- Full name: Hugo Omar Martínez
- Nationality: Argentine
- Born: 22 October 1942 (age 82)

Sport
- Sport: Boxing

Hugo Omar Martínez (born 22 October 1942) is an Argentine boxer. He competed in the men's featherweight event at the 1964 Summer Olympics. At the 1964 Summer Olympics, he lost to Khiru Soeun of Cambodia.
