= José Antonio Duran =

Mexican boxer (born 1946)

José Antonio Durán
Personal information
- Born: 17 January 1946 (age 79); Rosario, Durango, Mexico

Sport
- Sport: Boxing

José Antonio Durán (born 17 January 1946) is a Mexican boxer. He competed at the 1964 Summer Olympics and the 1968 Summer Olympics. At the 1964 Summer Olympics in Tokyo, he defeated Youssef Anwer and Seok Jong-gu, before losing to Charles Brown.
