= Virgilio Jiménez =

Cuban boxer

Personal information
- Nationality: Cuban
- Born: 2 June 1940 (age 84)

Sport
- Sport: Boxing

Virgilio Jiménez (born 2 June 1940) is a Cuban boxer. He competed in the men's welterweight event at the 1964 Summer Olympics.
