= Abel Almarez =

Argentine boxer

Abel Almaraz
Personal information
- Full name: Abel César Almaraz
- Born: 23 November 1941 Buenos Aires, Argentina
- Died: 23 May 2021 (aged 79)
- Height: 152 cm (5 ft 0 in)
- Weight: 54 kg (119 lb)

Sport
- Sport: Boxing
- Weight class: Bantamweight (-54 kg)
Medal record
Men's boxing
Representing Argentina
Pan American Games
| Gold medal – first place | 1963 São Paulo | Bantamweight |

Abel César Almaraz (23 November 1941 – 23 May 2021) was an Argentine boxer. He competed in the men's bantamweight event at the 1964 Summer Olympics. At the 1964 Summer Olympics, he defeated Christopher Rafter of Ireland in the Round of 32, before losing to Chung Shin-cho of South Korea in the Round of 16.
