= Boxing at the 1963 Pan American Games =

The Men's Boxing Tournament at the 1963 Pan American Games was held in São Paulo, Brazil, from April 20 to May 5.

== Medal winners ==
Event	Gold	Silver	Bronze
Flyweight (– 51 kilograms)	Floreal García; Uruguay	Pedro Dias; Brazil	Robert Carmody; United States
Bantamweight (– 54 kilograms)	Abel Almaraz; Argentina	Marcíal Guttiérez; Panama	Arthur Jones; United States
Featherweight (– 57 kilograms)	Rosemiro Mateus; Brazil	Héctor Pace; Argentina	Charles Brown; United States
Lightweight (– 60 kilograms)	Roberto Caminero; Cuba	João da Silva; Brazil	Barry Foster; Jamaica
Light Welterweight (– 63.5 kilograms)	Adolfo Moreira; Argentina	Orlando Nuñes; Brazil	Quincey Daniels; United States
Welterweight (– 67 kilograms)	Misael Vilugrón; Chile	Rubens Vasconcelos; Brazil	Felipe Pereyra; Argentina
Light Middleweight (– 71 kilograms)	Elecio Neves; Brazil	Manuel Sánchez; Peru	Osvaldo Mariño; Argentina
Middleweight (– 75 kilograms)	Luiz Cézar; Brazil	Leonardo Alcolea; Cuba	Fidel Odreman; Venezuela
Light Heavyweight (– 81 kilograms)	Fred Lewis; United States	Ronald Holmes; Jamaica	Ruben Alves; Brazil
Heavyweight (+ 81 kilograms)	Lee Carr; United States	José E. Jorge; Brazil	Raul Aguilar; Uruguay

== Medal table ==
Rank	Nation	Gold	Silver	Bronze	Total
1	Brazil (BRA)	3	5	1	9
2	Argentina (ARG)	2	1	2	5
3	United States (USA)	2	0	4	6
4	Cuba (CUB)	1	1	0	2
5	Uruguay (URU)	1	0	1	2
6	Chile (CHI)	1	0	0	1
7	Jamaica (JAM)	0	1	1	2
8	Panama (PAN)	0	1	0	1
8	Peru (PER)	0	1	0	1
10	Venezuela (VEN)	0	0	1	1
Totals (10 entries)		10	10	10	30
