= Shishman Mitsev =

Bulgarian boxer

Personal information
- Nationality: Bulgarian
- Born: 20 August 1937 (age 88) Stanke Dimitrov, Bulgaria

Sport
- Sport: Boxing

Shishman Mitsev (born 20 August 1937) is a Bulgarian former boxer. He competed in the men's welterweight event at the 1960 Summer Olympics. He is one of three brothers, along with Mikhail and Aleksandar, who were Olympic boxers for Bulgaria in the 1960s.
