= Luiz Cézar =

Brazilian boxer (born 1938)

Personal information
- Born: 11 July 1938 (age 87) São Paulo, Brazil

Sport
- Sport: Boxing
Medal record
Men's amateur boxing
Representing Brazil
Pan American Games
Gold medal – first place	1963 São Paulo	Middleweight

Luiz Cézar (born 11 July 1938) is a Brazilian boxer. He competed in the men's middleweight event at the 1964 Summer Olympics. At the 1964 Summer Olympics, he lost to Franco Valle of Italy.
