= Gichere Gakungu =

Kenyan boxer

Personal information
- Nationality: Kenyan
- Born: 1 January 1942 (age 83)

Sport
- Sport: Boxing

Gichere Gakungu (born 1 January 1942) is a Kenyan boxer. He competed in the men's welterweight event at the 1964 Summer Olympics.
