= Maurice Frilot =

American boxer (1940–2021)

Personal information
- Nationality: American
- Born: November 29, 1940 Denver, Colorado, U.S.
- Died: October 30, 2021 (aged 80)

Sport
- Sport: Boxing

Maurice Frilot (November 29, 1940 – October 30, 2021) was an American boxer. He competed in the men's welterweight event at the 1964 Summer Olympics. At the 1964 Summer Olympics, he lost to Ernest Mabwa of Uganda by decision in the Round of 32. Frilot died on October 30, 2021, at the age of 80.
