= Arnulfo Torrevillas =

Filipino boxer

Personal information
- Nationality: Filipino
- Born: August 15, 1939 (age 86) Philippine Commonwealth
- Height: 5 ft 3 in (160 cm)
- Weight: 119 lb (54 kg)

Sport
- Sport: Boxing
- Weight class: Bantamweight

Arnulfo Torrevillas (born August 15, 1939) is a Filipino former amateur boxer. He competed in the men's bantamweight event at the 1964 Summer Olympics. At the 1964 Summer Olympics, he defeated Börje Karvonen of Finland, before losing to Fermin Espinosa of Cuba.
