= Franco Zurlo =

Italian boxer (born 1940)

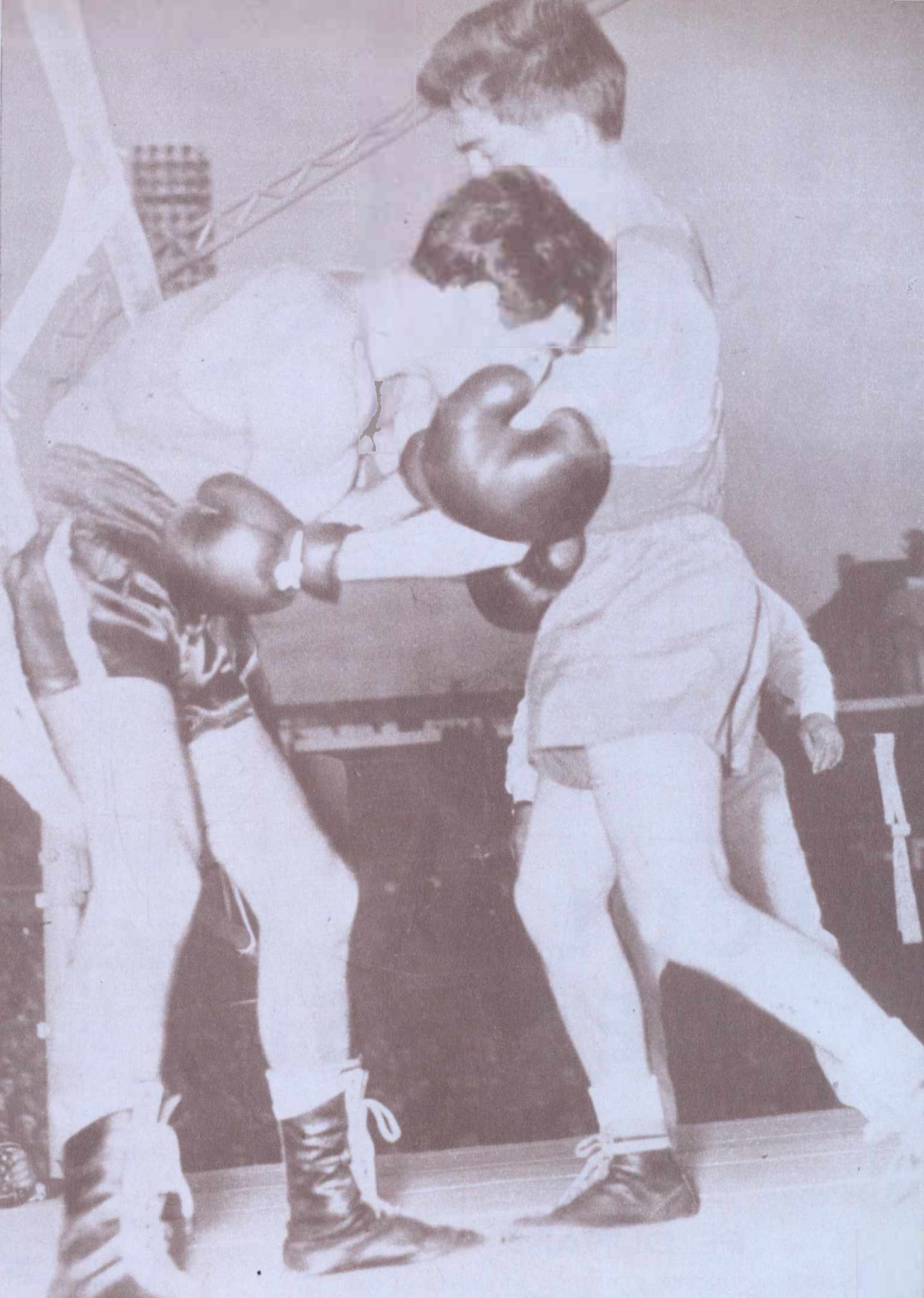
- Franco Zurlo, left, facing off against Nicolae Puiu

Personal information
- Full name: Francesco Zurlo
- Nationality: Italian
- Born: 4 October 1940 Brindisi, Italy
- Died: 17 June 2018 (aged 77) Brindisi, Italy

Sport
- Sport: Boxing

Franco Zurlo (4 October 1940 – 17 June 2018) was an Italian boxer. He competed in the men's bantamweight event at the 1964 Summer Olympics. At the 1964 Summer Olympics he defeated Mikhail Mitsev of Bulgaria in the Round of 32, before losing to Oleg Grigoryev of the Soviet Union in the Round of 16.
