= Anthony Villanueva =

Filipino boxer (1945–2014)

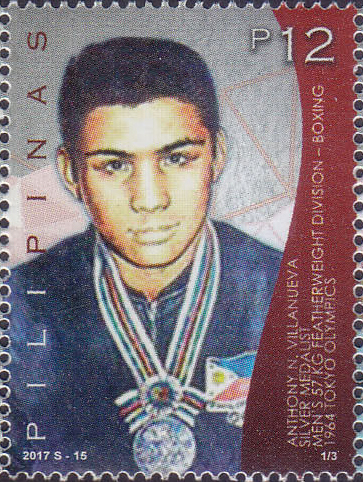

Personal information
- Nationality: Filipino
- Born: March 18, 1945 Cabuyao, Laguna, Philippine Commonwealth
- Died: May 13, 2014 (aged 69) Cabuyao, Laguna, Philippines
- Height: 5 ft 5 in (165 cm)
- Weight: 126 lb (57 kg)

Boxing career
- Weight class: Featherweight

Boxing record
- Wins: 1
- Losses: 3
- No contests: 1
Medal record
Representing the Philippines
Olympic Games
Silver medal – second place	1964 Tokyo	Featherweight

Anthony N. Villanueva (March 18, 1945 – May 13, 2014) was a Filipino amateur boxer. He competed in the featherweight (−57 kg) division at the 1964 Olympics and won a silver medal. Shortly after the Olympics he turned professional, but retired after five bouts. Besides boxing, Villanueva worked as an actor and boxing coach in the Philippines and as a security guard in the United States. He died after suffering several strokes.

His father, José Villanueva, was also an Olympic boxer who won a bronze medal as a bantamweight at the 1932 Los Angeles Games thus becoming the first father and son to win Olympic medals for the Philippines.

== Education ==
Villanueva studied at the Far Eastern University.

== Amateur career ==
Anthony Villanueva was scouted by businessman and sport enthusiast Eugenio Puyat. He later won the 1962 national title and qualified for the 1964 Summer Olympics in Tokyo. He faced Soviet boxer Stanislav Stepashkin, in the gold medal match and lost in a 3–2 controversial decision.

=== Olympic Games results ===
1964

- Defeated Giovanni Girgenti (Italy) 3–2
- Defeated Ben Hassan (Tunisia) 4–1
- Defeated Piotr Gutman (Poland) Referee Stopped Contest
- Defeated Charles Brown (United States) 4–1
- Lost to Stanislav Stepashkin (Soviet Union) 2–3

== Professional career ==
Villanueva became a professional boxer at age 20. His first fight as a professional was with Shigeo Nirasawa of Japan at the Araneta Coliseum in Cubao, Quezon City which took place on October 2, 1965, as part of Fiesta Fistiana, a fund raising event organized by the Philippine Sportswriters Association for disabled boxers.

Villanueva won the match by a controversial majority decision. The scoring of the judges was criticized and was described as something seen in movies. Judges Alfredo Quiazon and Alex Villacampa chose Villanueva as the victor with the tight scores 29–28 and 28–27 respectively. The third judge Jaime Valencia called it a draw with the score 29-all.

Anthony and his father filed a case against Ilang-Ilang Productions of Espiridion Laxa for P45,000 for "exploitation of popularity". The production firm was accused of filming the said match without the consent of the Villanuevas. The results of the case were never announced.

== Professional boxing record ==
1 Wins (1 decision), 3 Losses (2 knockouts, 1 decision), 1 No Contest
Res.	Record	Opponent	Type	Rd., Time	Date	Location	Notes
Lose	1–3	(Australia) Ross Eadie	TKO	1	1975-10-05	(Australia) Darwin Amphitheatre, Darwin, Northern Territory	
Lose	1–2	(Philippines) Jimmy Noel	TKO	8	1967-09-30	(Philippines) Rizal Memorial Coliseum, Manila	
Lose	1–1	(Philippines) Sugar Cane Carreon	D	10	1967-04-15	(Philippines) Angeles City	
NC	1–0	(Philippines) Aquino Junior	NC	6	1966-06-10	(Philippines) Rizal Memorial Coliseum, Manila	
Win	1–0	(Japan) Shigeo Nirasawa	MD	10	1965-10-02	(Philippines) Araneta Coliseum, Quezon City	Professional boxing debut.

== Acting career ==
Shortly after winning the silver medal, Villanueva went into an acting career, though at the cost of his amateur boxing license. He then starred in five movies. He appeared in Malakas, Kaliwa't Kanan with Nida Blanca, Salonga Brothers with then actor Joseph Estrada. Villanueva also appeared in The Pancho Villa Story.

== Later life ==
Villanueva was separated from his first wife from whom he had two children. He remarried in the US, and had a son with his American wife. After coming back from the US, he stayed with his common-law wife, Liezel Beldia, for 17 years until his death in 2014; they had a son together.

In 1976, he went to the United States to earn a living. He worked as a cook in a Mexican restaurant in Massachusetts, then as a security guard in Staten Island and the Philippine Consulate in New York City. He also worked as a boxing coach at private gyms. He later returned to the Philippines in 1988 assisted the Philippine national boxing coach team to prepare the team for the 1988 Summer Olympics then later returned the United States after failing in a bid to find a stable job but eventually returned home for good.

Villanueva suffered a mild stroke in 1999. He tried selling his silver medal for 1 million pesos a year later. He was persuaded to donate the medal to the Philippine Sports Commission instead.

== Death and legacy ==
Villanueva died in his sleep on May 13, 2014, in Cabuyao, Laguna. He was 69. Villanueva was bedridden due to multiple complications including kidney malfunction and severe heart ailments. He had suffered about five strokes and heart attacks in the past fourteen years before his death. Villanueva won the country's first silver medal at the 1964 Summer Olympics, a feat echoed by Onyok Velasco when he won the country's second silver medal at the 1996 Summer Olympics.

Manny Pacquiao described Villanueva as the "original Filipino boxing icon who should never be forgotten by the nation." AIBA president Wu Ching-Kuo also said that the death of Villanueva not only left a void in Philippine boxing but also "in the hearts of all those who knew this hero around the world."
