= Louis Johnson (boxer) =

American boxer

Personal information
- Nationality: American
- Born: November 4, 1938 (age 87) Portland, Oregon, United States

Sport
- Sport: Boxing

Louis Johnson (born November 4, 1938) is an American boxer. He competed in the men's bantamweight event at the 1964 Summer Olympics. At the 1964 Summer Olympics, he defeated Jan Huppen of the Netherlands, before losing to Nicolae Puiu of Romania.
