= William Booth (boxer) =

Australian boxer (born 1944)

Personal information
- Nationality: Australian
- Born: 19 September 1944 (age 80)

Sport
- Sport: Boxing

William Neal Booth (born 19 September 1944) is an Australian boxer. He competed in the men's bantamweight event at the 1964 Summer Olympics. At the 1964 Summer Olympics, he lost in his first fight to Fermin Espinosa of Cuba in the Round of 32.
