= Charles Brown (boxer) =

American boxer, born 1939

Charlie Brown
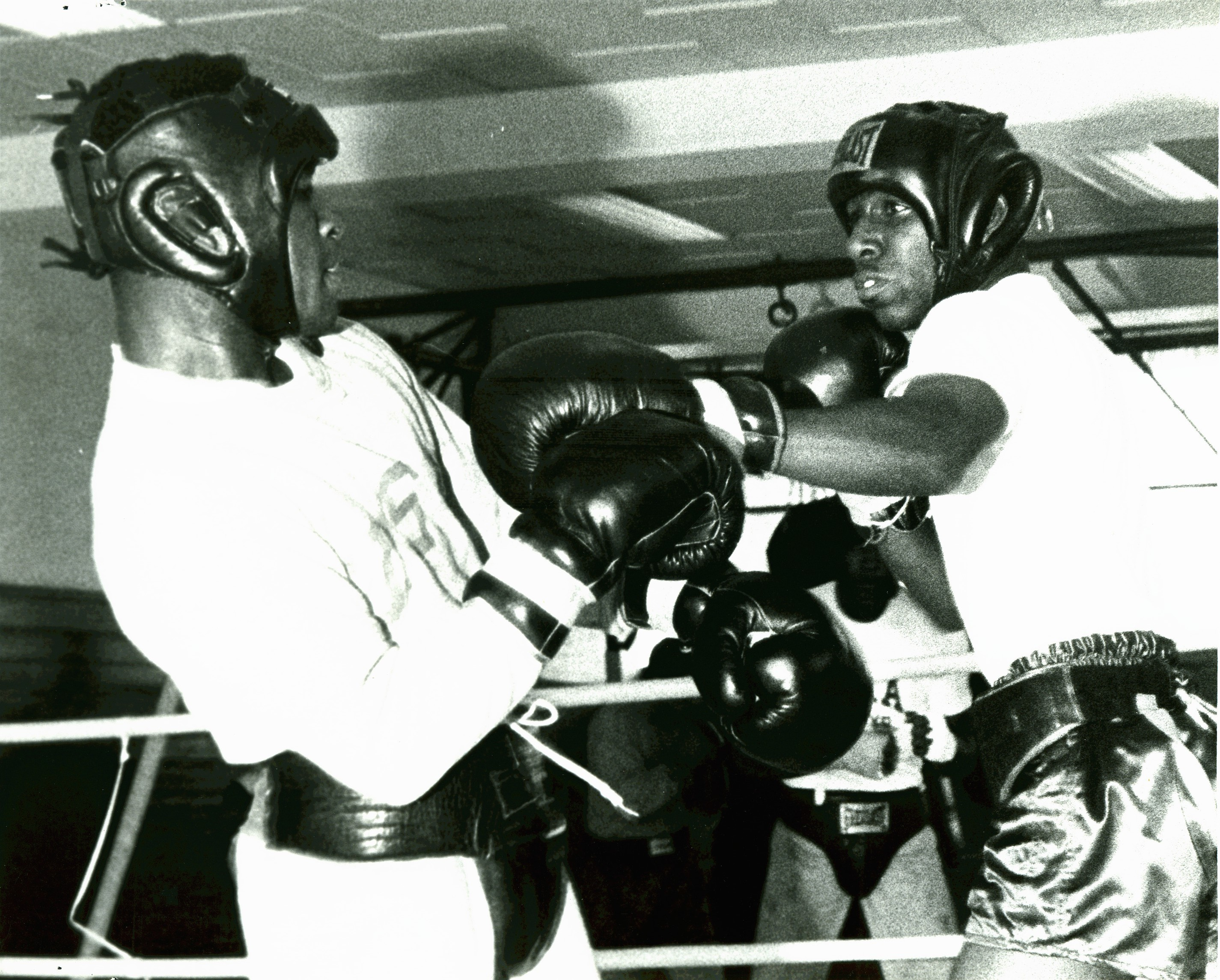
- Brown in 1964 (on the right)

Personal information
- Full name: Charles Brown
- Born: February 28, 1939 (age 87) Cincinnati, Ohio, U.S.
- Height: 5 ft 6 in (1.68 m)
- Weight: 159 lb (72 kg)

Sport
- Sport: Boxing
- Weight class: Featherweight (-57 kg)
Medal record
Men's boxing
Representing the United States
Olympic Games
Bronze medal – third place	1964 Tokyo	Featherweight
Pan American Games
Silver medal – second place	1959 Chicago	Featherweight
Bronze medal – third place	1963 São Paul	Featherweight

Charles Brown (born February 28, 1939) is a former amateur boxer from the United States who won the bronze medal in the Featherweight (−57 kg) division at the 1964 Tokyo Olympics. At the Pan American Games he won a silver medal in 1959 and a bronze medal in 1963.

Brown boxed out of the United States Marine Corps, and did not box as a professional.

== 1964 Olympic results ==
Below are the results of Charles Brown, an American featherweight boxer who competed at the 1964 Tokyo Olympics:

- Defeated Randall Hope (Australia) by decision, 5–0
- Defeated Soeun Khiru (Cambodia) by decision, 4–1
- Defeated José Antonio Duran (Mexico) by decision, 4–1
- Lost to Anthony Villanueva (Philippines) by decision, 1–4 (was awarded a bronze medal)
