= Masataka Takayama (boxer) =

Japanese boxer (born 1945)

Personal information
- Nationality: Japanese
- Born: 30 October 1945 (age 79); Tokyo, Japan

Sport
- Sport: Boxing

Masataka Takayama (高山 将孝, Takayama Masataka; born 30 October 1945) is a Japanese boxer.

== Professional career ==
He competed in the men's featherweight event at the 1964 Summer Olympics. At the 1964 Summer Olympics, he defeated Ian McLoughlin of Northern Rhodesia, before losing to Piotr Gutman of Poland.
