= Frederick Desrosiers =

Canadian boxer

Personal information
- Nationality: Canadian
- Born: 14 June 1940
- Died: 2 September 2004 (aged 64)

Sport
- Sport: Boxing

Frederick Desrosiers (14 June 1940 – 2 September 2004) was a Canadian boxer. He competed in the men's welterweight event at the 1964 Summer Olympics. At the 1964 Summer Olympics, he lost to Silvano Bertini of Italy.
