= Agustín Senin =

Spanish boxer

Personal information
- Full name: Agustín Senin Díez
- Nationality: Spanish
- Born: 4 September 1946 (age 78); Bilbao, Spain
- Height: 160 cm (5 ft 3 in)
- Weight: 54 kg (119 lb)

Sport
- Sport: Boxing

Agustín Senin Díez (Note: In this Spanish name, the first or paternal surname is Senin and the second or maternal family name is Díez.) (born 4 September 1946) is a Spanish boxer. He competed in the men's bantamweight event at the 1964 Summer Olympics. At the 1964 Summer Olympics, he lost to Law Hon Pak of Hong Kong.
