= Aleksandar Mitsev =

Bulgarian boxer

Personal information
- Nationality: Bulgarian
- Born: 17 May 1935 (age 91) Stanke Dimitrov, Bulgaria

Sport
- Sport: Boxing

Aleksandar Mitsev (born 17 May 1935) is a Bulgarian former boxer. He competed in the men's light welterweight event at the 1960 Summer Olympics. He is one of three brothers, along with Mikhail and Shishman, who were Olympic boxers for Bulgaria in the 1960s.
