= Brian Packer =

British boxer (1944–2021)

Personal information
- Nationality: British
- Born: 2 March 1944 Dartford, England
- Died: 30 August 2021 (aged 77)

Sport
- Sport: Boxing

Brian Packer (2 March 1944 – 30 August 2021) was a British boxer. He competed in the men's bantamweight event at the 1964 Summer Olympics. At the 1964 Summer Olympics, he lost in his first fight to Takao Sakurai of Japan in the Round of 32.

== Biography ==
Packer was born in March 1944 in Dartford, and began to box at the age of eleven. While working at a dockyard as an apprentice, he was he should never box again, unless he wanted to suffer permanent damage to his hand. However, after multiple operations, he went on to win the Amateur Boxing Association (ABA) bantamweight title.

He won the 1963 and 1964 ABA British bantamweight titles, when boxing out of the Dartford ABC. At the 1964 Summer Olympics in Tokyo, Packer competed in the men's bantamweight event. However, he lost his first-round bout to Takao Sakurai, who would go on to win the gold medal.

Following the Olympics, Paker became a professional boxer, winning fourteen of his fifteen fights. Packer then went up to the featherweight division, with his final fight taking place in November 1968. The following month, while working as a welder, he damaged his leg during a fall, which ended his boxing career.

Packer died on 30 August 2021 at the age of 77, after a long period suffering from dementia.
