= David Kotei =

Ghanaian boxer

D K Poison
Personal information
- Nickname: Poison
- Born: David Kotei Poison; 7 December 1950 (age 75) Accra, Ghana
- Weight: Featherweight; Lightweight

Boxing career
- Stance: Orthodox

Boxing record
- Total fights: 60
- Wins: 49
- Win by KO: 31
- Losses: 8
- Draws: 3

David Kotei Poision (originating from the Kotei family; born 12 July 1943), popularly called "D.K. Poison", is a former world featherweight boxing champion between 1975 and 1976. He is the first Ghanaian professional boxer to win a world title.

== Amateur career ==
DK Poison started his amateur career in Accra. He is one of many boxers spawned by Bukom, a suburb in the heart of the city populated by the Ga people. Many top Ghanaian boxers such as Roy Ankrah, Azuma Nelson and Ike Quartey are products of Bukom.

== Professional career ==
David Kotei turned professional under trainer Attuquaye Clottey. His first professional bout was on 5 February 1966 in Accra when he outpointed his opponent over six rounds. He became the national featherweight champion that year. Although he fought once in neighbouring Togo in 1967, all his subsequent fights through to 1971 were all in Ghana. In 1972 however, he fought as much as seven times in Australia, winning five and losing two. He won the African featherweight title on 2 February 1974 when he knocked out Tahar Ben Hassen in the first round of a scheduled 15 round fight in Tunis, Tunisia. Later on 7 December 1974, he also won the Commonwealth featherweight title with a technical knock out over Evan Armstrong, a British boxer in round 10 of a scheduled 15 rounds bout. This victory gave him an opportunity to go for the World Boxing Council version of the world title. On 20 September 1975, in The Forum, Inglewood, California, United States, he beat Rubén Olivares by split points decision after 15 rounds to become the first Ghanaian world boxing champion. He relinquished the African and Commonwealth titles following this victory. The Ghana government gave him an estate house at Teshie-Nungua, an Accra suburb in honour of this achievements in boxing. He however lost the title in his third defence on 6 November 1976 by unanimous points decision to Danny "Little Red" Lopez in a fierce fight in Accra, Ghana.He is married with three daughters. He also defeated Fuku Yama in Japan.

DK Poison was never the same again after this defeat. He failed in 1978 to regain either the world or commonwealth featherweight titles. His last professional bout was in 1989 when he lost an African lightweight title fight.

== Professional boxing record ==
49 Wins (31 Knockouts), 8 Defeats (3 Knockouts), 3 Draws
Res.	Record	Opponent	Type	Rd., Time	Date	Location	Notes
Loss	49-8-3	(Ghana) Akwei Addo	KO	9(12)	1989-09-30	(Niger) Orion Cinema Hall, Accra	For African lightweight title
Loss	39–5-2	(Niger) Eddie Ndukwu	PTS	15	1978-09-29	(Niger) National Stadium, Lagos	For Commonwealth featherweight title
Loss	38–4-2	(United States) Danny Lopez	TKO	6 (15)	1978-02-15	(United States) Hilton Hotel, Las Vegas, Nevada	For WBC featherweight title
Won	36–3-2	(Togo) Laurent Bazie	PTS	15	1977-07-30	(Ghana) El Wak Stadium, Accra	Won vacant African featherweight title
Loss	34-3-2	(United States) Danny Lopez	UD	15	1976-11-06	(Ghana) Accra Sports Stadium, Accra	Lost WBC featherweight title
Win	31-2-2	(Mexico) Rubén Olivares	SD	15	1975-09-20	(United States) Forum, Inglewood, California	Won WBC featherweight title
Win	29-2-1	(United Kingdom) Evan Armstrong	TKO	10(15)	1974-12-07	(Ghana) Accra Sports Stadium, Accra	Won Commonwealth featherweight title
Win	27-2-1	(Tunisia) Tahar Ben Hassen	KO	1(15)	1974-02-02	(Tunisia) Palais du Sport, Tunis	Won African featherweight title
Draw	18–0-1	(Ghana) Freddie Mensah	SD	8	1971-06-05	(Ghana) Accra Sports Stadium, Accra	
Win	11–0	(Ghana) Teddy Walker	TKO	4(15)	1969-03-01	(Ghana) Black Star Square, Accra	Won Ghanaian featherweight title.
Win	7-0	(Togo) Kid Killer	TKO	8(8)	1968-03-01	(Ghana) Prempeh Assembly Hall, Kumasi	
Win	6-0	(Togo) Peter Ayivor	PTS	8	1967-06-05	(Togo) Lomé	
Win	5–0	(Togo) Emmanuel Dudzro	PTS	8	1967-05-02	(Togo) Lomé	
Win	4–0	(Ghana) Shido Armah	KO	3(8)	1967-03-01	(Ghana) Accra	
Win	3–0	(Ghana) Bob Cofie	TKO	6 (8)	1966-12-10	(Ghana) Accra Sports Stadium, Accra	
Win	2–0	(Ghana) Abu Norgah	TKO	4 (8)	1966-09-03	(Ghana) Accra Sports Stadium, Accra	
Win	1–0	(Ghana) Famous Lartey	PTS	6	1966-02-05	(Ghana) Accra Sports Stadium, Accra	

== Retirement ==
David Kotey has lived a relatively modest and quiet life after retirement. He has gone through marital and financial difficulties and reportedly has some grievances about how his purse was disbursed during his boxing years.

== Loan to Ghana ==
According to reports and Kotey's own story, in 1976, he loaned an amount of 45,000 dollars to the Government of Ghana, then led by Ignatius Kutu Acheampong. The money was intended for the purchase of canned mackerel to mitigate the harsh economic and food conditions the country was facing. The loan had been facilitated by his management, which was led by Col John Slater. According to Kotey, the money was part of his reward for defending his title against Japan's Fuku Yama in 1976. The loan has not been paid back to date because shortly after the canned mackerels arrived in the country, the Acheampong's regime was overthrown by General Akuffo in a military palace coup in October 1975. In September 2019, the president of Ghana, Nana Akufo Addo noted that he would look into the issue. This was at a meeting with a delegation of former world boxing champions from Ghana.

The president of Ghana, Nana Akuffo Addo, on 6 October 2020 has directed an amount of $45,000 that was owed by Ghana to him on "compassionate grounds".

== Song ==
After Kotey won the World featherweight title in Accra in September 1975, one of Ghana's leading highlife artists at the time, Senior Eddie Donkor released a song in Twi in his honour entitled "D. K. Poison Mo".

== See also ==
- List of WBC world champions
- Azumah Nelson

== Notes and references ==
Achievements
Preceded by Rubén Olivares	WBC Featherweight Champion; 20 Sep 1975 – 6 Nov 1976	Succeeded by Danny Lopez
