= Valentín Loren =

Spanish boxer (born 1946)

Personal information
- Nationality: Spanish
- Born: 26 August 1946 (age 78)

Sport
- Sport: Boxing

Valentín Loren (born 26 August 1946) is a Spanish boxer. He competed in the men's featherweight event at the 1964 Summer Olympics. At the 1964 Summer Olympics, he lost to Hsu Hung-cheng of Taiwan by disqualification in the Round of 32.
