= Randall Hope =

Australian boxer

Personal information
- Nationality: Australian
- Born: 4 April 1943 (age 81)

Sport
- Sport: Boxing

Randall Hope (born 4 April 1943) is an Australian boxer. He competed in the men's featherweight event at the 1964 Summer Olympics. At the 1964 Summer Olympics, he lost to Charles Brown of the United States.
