= Chung Shin-cho =

South Korean boxer (born 1940)

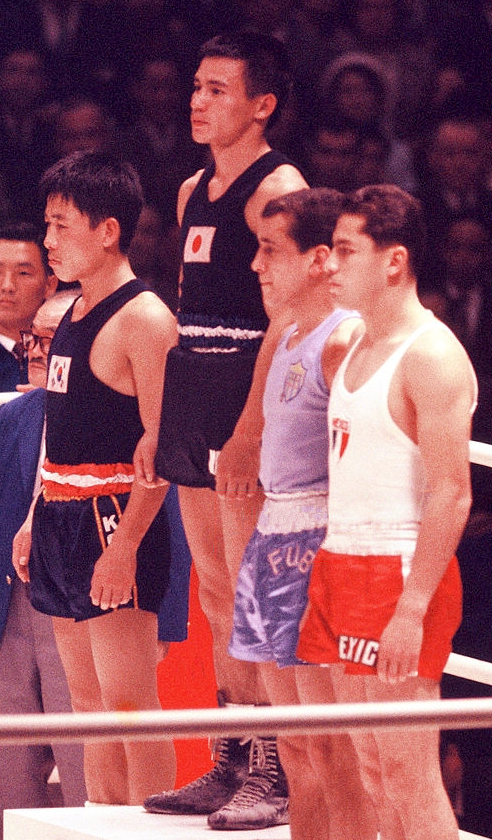
- Chung Shin-cho (left) at the 1964 Olympics

Personal information
- Born: January 6, 1940 (age 86) Seoul, South Korea
- Height: 1.62 m (5 ft 4 in)

Korean name
- Hangul: 정신조
- Hanja: 鄭申朝
- RR: Jeong Sinjo
- MR: Chŏng Sinjo

Sport
- Sport: Boxing
Medal record
Representing South Korea
Olympic Games
Silver medal – second place	1964 Tokyo	Bantamweight
Asian Games
Gold medal – first place	1962 Jakarta	Flyweight

Chung Shin-cho (Korean: 정신조; born January 6, 1940) is a retired amateur boxer from South Korea. He competed at the 1960 and 1964 Olympics and won a silver medal in the bantamweight in 1964.

== Results ==
1960 Olympic Games
Event	Round	Result	Opponent	Score
Flyweight	First	bye		
Flyweight	Second	Loss	(Soviet Union) Sergei Sivko	0-5

1964 Olympic Games
Event	Round	Result	Opponent	Score
Bantamweight	First	Win	(Egypt) Hosni Farag	5-0
Bantamweight	Second	Win	(Argentina) Abel Almaraz	3-2
Bantamweight	Quarterfinal	Win	(Cuba) Fermin Espinosa	WO
Bantamweight	Semifinal	Win	(Mexico) Juan Fabila Mendoza	4-1
Bantamweight	Final	Loss	(Japan) Takao Sakurai	RSC 2
