= Mikhail Mitsev =

Bulgarian boxer

Personal information
- Nationality: Bulgarian
- Born: 6 December 1940
- Died: 17 February 2012 (aged 71) Sofia, Bulgaria

Sport
- Sport: Boxing

Mikhail Mitsev (6 December 1940 – 17 February 2012) was a Bulgarian boxer. He competed in the men's bantamweight event at the 1964 Summer Olympics. At the 1964 Summer Olympics, he lost to Franco Zurlo of Italy. He was one of three brothers, along with Shishman and Aleksandar, who were Olympic boxers for Bulgaria in the 1960s.
