= Héctor Pace =

Argentine boxer

Personal information
- Full name: Héctor Jorge Pace
- Born: 22 July 1944 (age 81) La Plata, Argentina
- Height: 169 cm (5 ft 7 in)
- Weight: 60 kg (132 lb)

Sport
- Sport: Boxing
- Weight class: Featherweight (-57 kg); Lightweight (-60 kg)
Medal record
Men's boxing
Representing Argentina
Pan American Games
Silver medal – second place	1963 São Paulo	Featherweight

Héctor Jorge Pace (born 22 July 1944) is an Argentine boxer. He competed in the men's lightweight event at the 1964 Summer Olympics.
