= Felipe Pereyra =

Argentine boxer

Personal information
- Nationality: Argentine
- Born: 22 September 1942
- Died: 2015 (aged 72–73)

Sport
- Sport: Boxing
Medal record
Men's amateur boxing
Representing Argentina
Pan American Games
| Bronze medal – third place | 1963 São Paulo | Welterweight |

Felipe Pereyra (22 September 1942 – 2015) was an Argentine boxer. He competed in the men's welterweight event at the 1964 Summer Olympics.
