= Lee Chen-chu =

Taiwanese boxer

Personal information
- Full name: 李健次, Pinyin: Lǐ Jiàn-cì
- Nationality: Taiwanese
- Born: 7 May 1940 (age 84)

Sport
- Sport: Boxing

Lee Chen-chu (born 7 May 1940) is a Taiwanese boxer. He competed in the men's bantamweight event at the 1964 Summer Olympics.
