= Cosimo Pinto =

Italian boxer (born 1943)

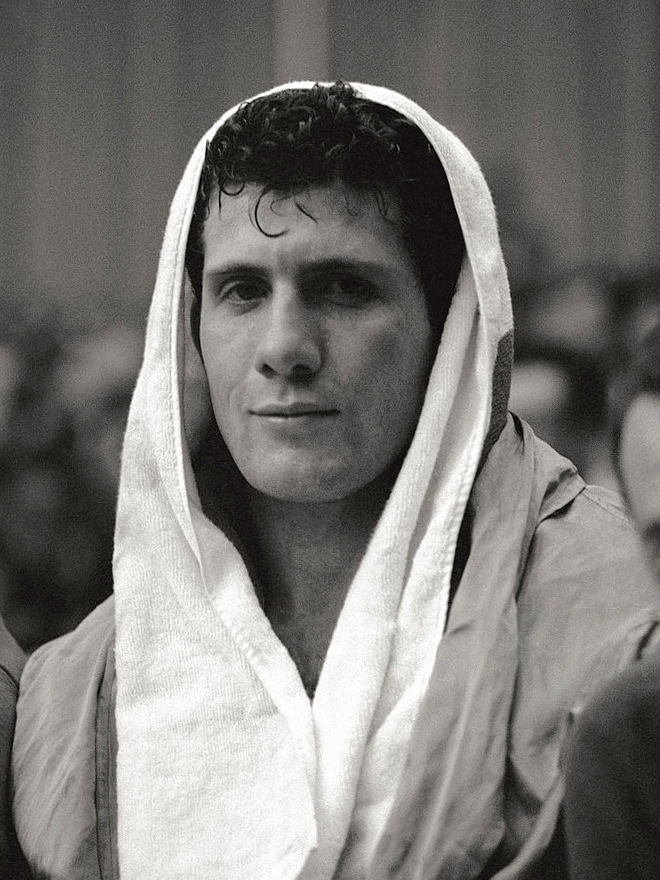
- Cosimo Pinto in 1964

Personal information
- Born: 14 March 1943 (age 83) Novara, Italy
- Height: 1.78 m (5 ft 10 in)
- Weight: 81 kg (179 lb)

Sport
- Sport: Boxing
- Club: CS Esercito
Medal record
Representing Italy
Olympic Games
Gold medal – first place	1964 Tokyo	Light heavyweight
European Championships
Bronze medal – third place	1967 Rome	-81 kg
Mediterranean Games
Gold medal – first place	1963 Naples	Light Heavyweight

Cosimo Pinto (born 14 March 1943) is an Italian retired Amateur boxer who won a gold medal at the 1964 Summer Olympics. Contrary to most of his teammates, he remained an amateur and won a bronze medal at the 1967 European championships.

== Amateur career ==
Pinto started his boxing training after his military service in 1962. He was inspired by the 1960 Summer Olympics bronze medallist Giulio Saraudi. A year into his career, in 1963, Pinto won the gold medal at the Mediterranean Games in his home country, and a few months later, he travelled to Tokyo and won the Pre-Olympic tournament via knockout over Tadayuki Maruyama.

The following year in the Olympics, Pinto had a fairly easy path to the final but then faced Aleksei Kiselyov, who proved he was a tough adversary in the preliminary bouts. The fight played out and turned into a negative incident. Two judges gave the contest to the Italian by a single point, while the other three judges had the two men level with 59 points. Two of the tied judges gave the decision to Kiselyov, but the third judge gave it to Pinto, thus crowning him the Olympic gold medal.

=== 1964 Olympic record ===
Below are the results of Cosimo Pinto, as a light heavyweight boxer at the 1964 Olympics in Tokyo:

- Round of 16: defeated Rudie Lubbers (Netherlands) via points decision
- Quarterfinal: defeated Jurgen Schlegel (Unified Team of Germany) via points decision
- Semifinal: defeated Alexander Nicolov (Bulgaria), referee stopped the contest
- Final: defeated Aleksei Kiselyov (Soviet Union) via points decision

== Later career ==
Pinto won two Italian boxing championships. The first was in 1965 and the second in 1967. He was a bronze medal winner at the 1967 European Championships held in Rome. In 1968, right before the Olympics, Pinto retired from boxing at the age of 25.

== Personal life ==
After his retirement, Pinto worked in a bank for many years.
