= Ek Sam An =

Cambodian boxer

Personal information
- Nationality: Cambodian
- Born: 16 January 1944 (age 81)

Sport
- Sport: Boxing

Ek Sam An (born 16 January 1944) is a Cambodian boxer. He competed in the men's bantamweight event at the 1964 Summer Olympics.
