= Boxing at the 1964 Summer Olympics – Welterweight =

Boxing competitions

The welterweight class in the boxing at the 1964 Summer Olympics competition was the fifth-heaviest class. Welterweights were limited to those boxers weighing less than 67 kilograms. 30 boxers from 30 nations competed.

== Medalists ==
Gold	Marian Kasprzyk; Poland
Silver	Ričardas Tamulis; Soviet Union
Bronze	Silvano Bertini; Italy
Bronze	Pertti Purhonen; Finland

== Results ==
Round of 32; 12 October
Niculescu (ROU)	5
Ramirez (MEX)	0
Frilot (USA)	0
Mabwa (UGA)	5
Hong (ROC)	RSC
Dabore (NIG)	W
Pedersen (DEN)	W
Hie Toh (CIV)	DQ
Nemecek (TCH)	5
Bulner (CEY)	0
Purhonen (FIN)	5
Roberts (AUS)	0
Desrosiers (CAN)	RSC
Bertini (ITA)	W
Saddik (EGY)	W
Songsang (THA)	DQ
Jimenez (CUB)	DQ
Pereyra (ARG)	W
Varley (GBR)	3
Lee (KOR)	2
Vilugron (CHI)	2
Kasprzyk (POL)	3
Alimi (NGR)	3
Gakungu (KEN)	2
Pourroudsari (IRI)	0
Kichijiro (JPN)	5
Alipala (PHI)	W
Khalid (IRQ)	DQ

Round of 16; 16 October
Guse (EUA)	0
Tamulis (URS)	5
Niculescu (ROU)	2
Mabwa (UGA)	3
Dabore (NIG)	W
Pedersen (DEN)	RSC
Nemecek (TCH)	RSC
Purhonen (FIN)	W
Bertini (ITA)	5
Saddik (EGY)	0
Pereyra (ARG)	2
Varley (GBR)	3
Kasprzyk (POL)	5
Alimi (NGR)	0
Hamada (JPN)	5
Alipala (PHI)	0

Quarterfinals; 19 October
Tamulis (URS)	5
Mabwa (UGA)	0
Dabore (NIG)	2
Purhonen (FIN)	3
Bertini (ITA)	W
Varley (GBR)	RSC
Kasprzyk (POL)	5
Hamada (JPN)	0

Semifinals; 21 October
Tamulis (URS)	5
Purhonen (FIN) (bronze)	0
Bertini (ITA) (bronze)	2
Kasprzyk (POL)	3

Final; 23 October
Tamulis (URS) (silver)	1
Kasprzyk (POL) (gold)	4

== Sources ==
Tokyo Organizing Committee (1964). The Games of the XVIII Olympiad: Tokyo 1964, vol. 2.
