= Jonas Tamulis =

Lithuanian politician

Jonas Tamulis (born March 5, 1958) is a Lithuanian politician. A liberal member of parliament, in 1990 he was among those who signed the Act of the Re-Establishment of the State of Lithuania. Tamulis served as special guest to the Parliamentary Assembly of the Council of Europe from February 2001 to February 2002.
