= Börje Karvonen =

Finnish boxer

Personal information
- Nationality: Finnish
- Born: 14 September 1938; Helsinki, Finland
- Died: 7 March 2016 (aged 77); Helsinki, Finland

Sport
- Sport: Boxing

Börje Karvonen (14 September 1938 – 7 March 2016) was a Finnish boxer. He competed at the 1960 Summer Olympics and the 1964 Summer Olympics. At the 1964 Summer Olympics, he lost to Arnulfo Torrevillas of the Philippines in the Round of 32.
