= Tahar Ben Hassen =

Tunisian boxer (born 1941)

Tamar Ben Hassan
Personal information
- Nationality: Tunisian
- Born: 14 July 1941 (age 83); Tunis, Tunisia

Sport
- Sport: Boxing

Tahar Ben Hassen (born July 14, 1941), sometimes written as Tamar Ben Hassan, is a retired Tunisian boxer.

== Olympics ==
Hassen competed in the 1960 Summer Olympics as a bantamweight. He lost his first bout to Nicolae Puiu after receiving a first round bye.

Hassen also competed in the 1964 Summer Olympics as a featherweight. He won is first bout against Peter Weiss, but lost his next bout against eventual silver medalist Anthony Villanueva.

== Professional ==
As a professional Hassen lost to David Kotey for the African Boxing Union featherweight title. His record was 26 wins (15ko), 8 losses (5ko) and 3 draws.
