= Hussein Saddik =

Egyptian boxer

Personal information
- Nationality: Egyptian
- Born: 5 April 1939 (age 86)

Sport
- Sport: Boxing

Hussein Saddik (born 5 April 1939) is an Egyptian boxer. He competed in the men's welterweight event at the 1964 Summer Olympics.
