= Michael Varley =

British boxer (1939–2018)

Personal information
- Nationality: British (English)
- Born: 30 November 1939; Nottingham, England
- Died: 8 September 2018 (aged 78); Nottingham, England

Sport
- Sport: Boxing

Michael Andrew Varley (30 November 1939 – 8 September 2018) was a British boxer. He competed in the men's welterweight event at the 1964 Summer Olympics.

Varley won the 1964 Amateur Boxing Association British welterweight title, when boxing out of the Clifton ABC.
