= Stanislav Stepashkin =

Russian boxer

Personal information
- Full name: Станислав Иванович Степашкин
- Nationality: Soviet Union
- Born: 1 September 1940 Moscow, Russian SFSR, Soviet Union
- Died: 4 September 2013 (aged 73) Moscow, Russia
- Height: 1.63 m (5 ft 4 in)
- Weight: 57 kg (126 lb)

Sport
- Sport: Boxing
- Weight class: Featherweight
- Club: Trudovye Rezervy
Medal record
Olympic Games
| Gold medal – first place | 1964 Tokyo | Featherweight |
European Amateur Championships
| Gold medal – first place | 1963 Moscow | Featherweight |
| Gold medal – first place | 1965 Berlin | Featherweight |

Stanislav Ivanovich Stepashkin (Russian: Станислав Иванович Степашкин; 1 September 1940 – 4 September 2013) was an Olympic boxer from the Soviet Union.

Born in Moscow, Stepashkin trained at Trudovye Rezervy until 1963 and then at the Armed Forces sports society. He became the Honoured Master of Sports of the USSR in 1964 and was awarded the Order of the Badge of Honor in the following year. He competed at the 1964 Tokyo Olympics in the Featherweight (-57 kg) division winning the gold medal. During his career Stepashkin won 193 fights out of 204. He graduated from the State Order of Lenin Central Institute of Physical Education.

== 1964 Olympic results ==
Below is the record of Stanislav Stepashkin, a featherweight boxer from the Soviet Union who competed at the 1964 Tokyo Olympics:

- Round of 32: Defeated Jose Nieves (Puerto Rico) referee stopped contest
- Round of 16: Defeated Hsu Hung Chen (Republic of China) referee stopped contest
- Quarterfinal: Defeated Constantin Crudu (Romania) referee stopped contest in the third round
- Semifinal: Defeated Heinz Schulz (Unified Team of Germany) by knockout
- Final: Defeated Anthony Villanueva (Philippines) by decision, 3-2 (won gold medal)
