= Floreal García =

Uruguayan boxer

Personal information
- Nationality: Uruguay
- Born: Gualberto Floreal García; 24 May 1943 Montevideo, Uruguay
- Died: 20 December 1974 (aged 31) Soca, Uruguay
- Spouse: Mirtha Hernández

Boxing career
Medal record
Men's amateur boxing
Representing Uruguay
Pan American Games
Gold medal – first place	1963 São Paulo	Flyweight

Gualberto Floreal García (24 May 1943 – 20 December 1974) was a Uruguayan boxer.

== Life and career ==
García was born in Montevideo.

García competed at the 1963 Pan American Games, winning the gold medal in the flyweight event.

García died on 20 December 1974 in Soca, at the age of 31.
