= Pertti Purhonen =

Finnish boxer

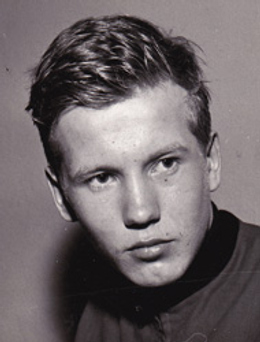

Personal information
- Born: 14 June 1942 Helsinki, Finland
- Died: 5 February 2011 (aged 68) Porvoo, Finland
- Height: 181 cm (5 ft 11 in)
- Weight: 60–70 kg (132–154 lb)

Sport
- Sport: Boxing
Medal record
Representing Finland
Olympic Games
Bronze medal – third place	1964 Tokyo	Welterweight

Pertti Ilmari Purhonen (14 June 1942 – 5 February 2011) was a Finnish boxer who won a bronze medal at the 1964 Olympics. Domestically he collected nine consecutive Finnish titles in lightweight (1960–61), light-welterweight (1962) and welterweight divisions (1963–68); he was also a Nordic champion in 1961, 1963 and 1967. In 1969 he turned professional, but retired the same year after winning his both bouts, one by knockout. He then founded a non-profit organization Kriisipalveluyhdistys (Crisis Service) that trains workers how to behave in crisis situations. During his last six years Purhonen suffered from Alzheimer's disease. He died in 2011, aged 68, three years after being inducted into the Finnish Boxing Hall of Fame. He was buried in the Malmi Cemetery.
