= Nectarios Kellis =

Australian Greek Orthodox priest

Nectarios Kellis was an Australian Greek Orthodox priest who embarked on a mission in Madagascar in the 1990s and eventually became the Greek Orthodox Bishop of Madagascar. He was inspired by an appeal in a church magazine for missionaries to revive the Eastern Orthodox Church in Madagascar.

== Death ==
On 11 September 2004, he was killed in a helicopter crash along with Petros VII, Pope and Patriarch of Alexandria and all Africa, and several other clergy.

== See also ==
- Eastern Orthodoxy in Madagascar
