= Hsu Hung-cheng =

Taiwanese boxer

Personal information
- Full name: 徐 鴻進, Pinyin: Xú Hóng-jìn
- Nationality: Taiwanese
- Born: 1 August 1941 (age 83)

Sport
- Sport: Boxing

Hsu Hung-cheng (born 1 August 1941) is a Taiwanese boxer. He competed in the men's featherweight event at the 1964 Summer Olympics.
