= Jan Huppen =

Dutch boxer (1942–2018)

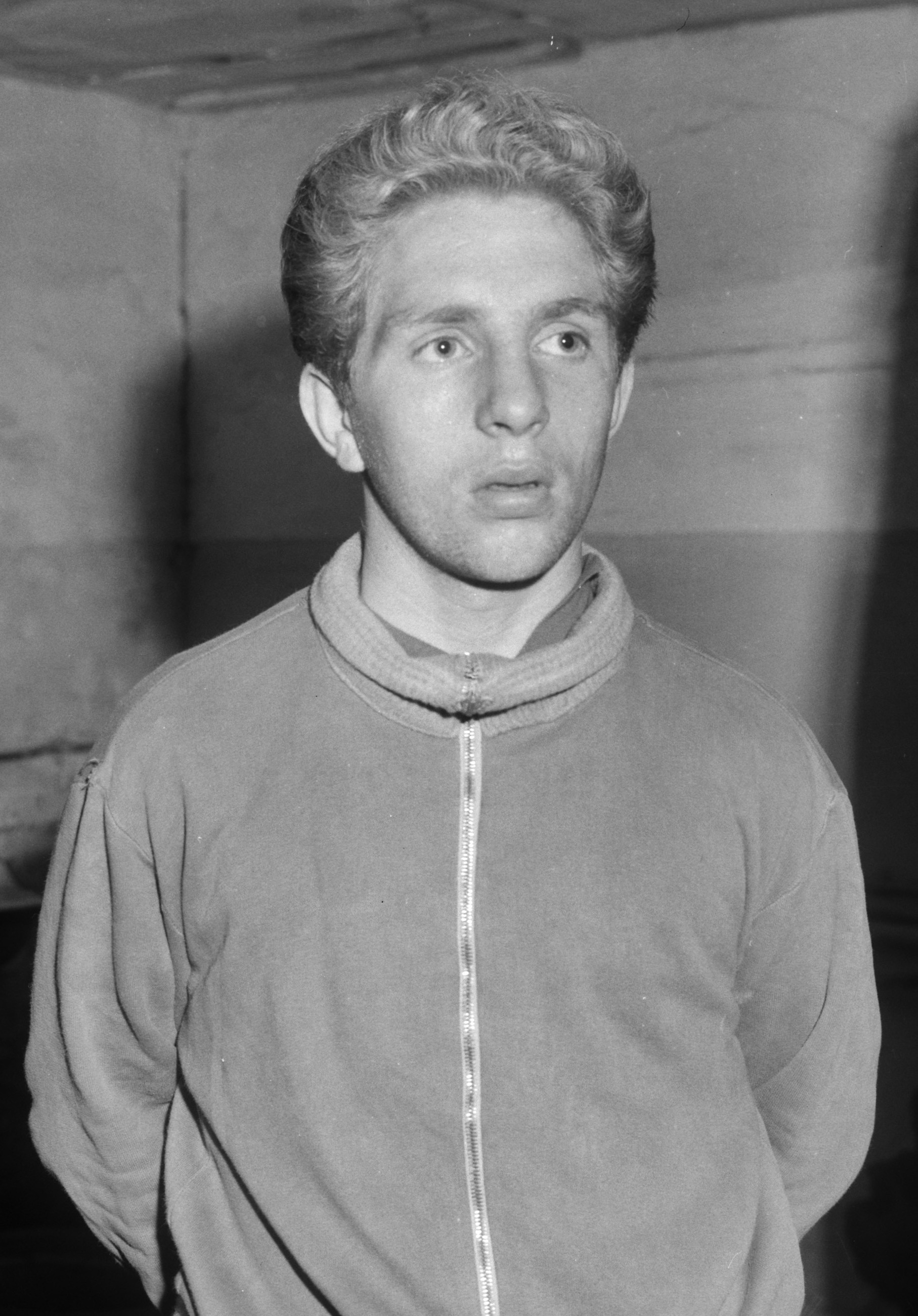
- Jan Huppen in 1964.

Personal information
- Born: 24 September 1942 Amsterdam, Netherlands
- Died: 19 October 2018 (aged 76)
- Height: 1.60 m (5 ft 3 in)
- Weight: 54 kg (119 lb)

Sport
- Sport: Boxing
- Club: Groothuis, Amsterdam

Jan Huppen (24 September 1942 – 19 October 2018) was a Dutch boxer. He competed in the bantamweight classification at the 1964 Summer Olympics in Tokyo and finished in 17th position. Huppen ran a boxing club in Amsterdam.

== 1964 Olympic results ==
- Round of 32: lost to Louis Johnson (United States) by decision, 0-5.
