= Jumaat Ibrahim =

Malaysian boxer

Personal information
- Nationality: Singaporean/Malaysian
- Born: 28 October 1938 (age 87)

Sport
- Sport: Boxing

Jumaat Ibrahim (born 28 October 1938) is a Singaporean boxer. He competed for Malaysia in the men's flyweight event at the 1964 Summer Olympics. At the 1964 Summer Olympics in Tokyo, he lost by knockout to Sulley Shittu of Ghana.
