= Fermin Espinosa =

Cuban boxer (born 1940)

Fermín Espinosa
Personal information
- Full name: Fermín Espinosa Reyes
- Born: 7 July 1940 (age 86) Havana, Cuba
- Died: 3 September 2022 (aged 82)
- Height: 163 cm (5 ft 4 in)
- Weight: 54 kg (119 lb)

Sport
- Sport: Boxing
- Weight class: Bantamweight
Medal record
Men's boxing
Representing Cuba
Central American and Caribbean Games
Gold medal – first place	1967 San Juan	Bantamweight -54 kg
Pan American Games
Silver medal – second place	1967 Winnipeg	Bantamweight -54 kg

Fermín Espinosa Reyes (Note: In this Spanish name, the first or paternal surname is Espinosa and the second or maternal family name is Reyes.) (7 July 1940 – 3 September 2022) was a Cuban boxer. He competed at the 1964 Summer Olympics and the 1968 Summer Olympics. At the 1964 Summer Olympics, he defeated William Booth and Arnulfo Torrevillas, before losing to Chung Shin-cho.
