= Giovanni Girgenti =

Italian boxer

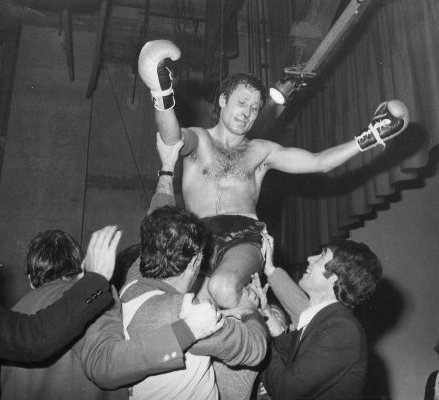

Personal information
- Nationality: Italian
- Born: 18 December 1942 (age 83) Marsala, Italy

Sport
- Sport: Boxing

Giovanni Girgenti (born 18 December 1942) is an Italian boxer. He competed in the men's featherweight event at the 1964 Summer Olympics.
