= Heinz Schulz =

East German boxer

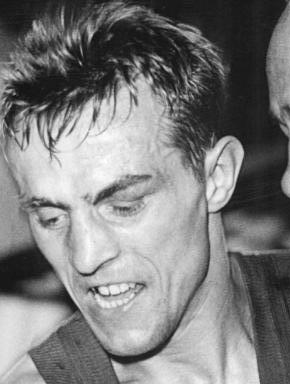
- Schulz in 1964

Medal record

Men's Boxing

Representing Germany

Olympic Games
Bronze medal – third place	1964 Tokyo	Featherweight

Heinz Schulz (5 January 1935 in Bernburg - 27 December 2015) was an East German former featherweight boxer who competed for the United Team of Germany and won the bronze medal at the Olympic Games in Tokyo 1964.

He competed for the SC Dynamo Berlin / Sportvereinigung (SV) Dynamo.

== 1964 Olympic results ==
Below is the record of Heinz Schulz, a featherweight boxer who competed for the United Team of Germany at the 1964 Tokyo Olympics:

- Round of 32: defeated Thapa Bhim Bahadur (Nepal) by decision, 5–0
- Round of 16: defeated Philip Waruinge (Kenya) by decision, 5–0
- Quarterfinal: defeated Tin Tun (Burma) by decision, 5–0
- Semifinal: lost to Stanislav Stepashkin (Soviet Union) by knockout (was awarded bronze medal)
