= Badawi El-Bedewi =

Egyptian boxer

Personal information
- Nationality: Egyptian
- Born: 14 May 1942 (age 83)

Sport
- Sport: Boxing

Badawi El-Bedewi (born 14 May 1942) is an Egyptian boxer. He competed in the men's featherweight event at the 1964 Summer Olympics.
