= Sikuru Alimi =

Nigerian boxer

Personal information
- Nationality: Nigerian
- Born: 22 September 1942 (age 82)

Sport
- Sport: Boxing

Sikuru Alimi (born 22 September 1942) is a Nigerian boxer. He competed in the men's welterweight event at the 1964 Summer Olympics.
