= Seok Jong-gu =

Korean male boxer

Personal information
- Nationality: South Korean
- Born: 23 February 1944 (age 81)

Sport
- Sport: Boxing

Seok Jong-gu (born 23 February 1944) is a South Korean boxer. He competed in the men's featherweight event at the 1964 Summer Olympics.
