= Niyom Prasertsom =

Thai boxer

Personal information
- Nationality: Thai
- Born: 3 July 1943 (age 82); Samut Sakhon, Thailand

Sport
- Sport: Boxing

Niyom Prasertsom (born 3 July 1943) is a Thai boxer. He competed at the 1964 Summer Olympics and the 1968 Summer Olympics. At the 1964 Summer Olympics, he lost to István Tóth of Hungary in the Round of 64.
