= Pat Fitzsimmons =

Irish boxer

Personal information
- Nickname: Paddy
- Nationality: Northern Irish
- Born: 4 December 1943 (age 82)
- Height: 160 cm (5 ft 3 in)
- Weight: 56 kg (123 lb)

Sport
- Sport: Boxing
- Event(s): featherweight bantamweight
- Club: St. Matthew's BC, Belfast

Patrick Fitzsimmons also spelt Fitzsimons (born 4 December 1943) is a former boxer from Northern Ireland, who represented Ireland at the 1964 Summer Olympics.

== Biography ==
Fitzsimons was selected for the 1962 Northern Irish team for the 1962 British Empire and Commonwealth Games in Perth, Australia. He competed in the bantamweight category losing to John Sentongo of Uganda in the quarter-final round.

At the 1964 Olympic Games in Tokyo, he competed in the men's featherweight event.
