= Eastern Orthodoxy in Madagascar =

Eastern Orthodoxy in Madagascar refers to adherents and religious communities of Eastern Orthodox Christianity in Madagascar. Eastern Orthodox Christians in Madagascar are under ecclesiastical jurisdiction of the Eastern Orthodox Patriarchate of Alexandria and all Africa.

== History ==
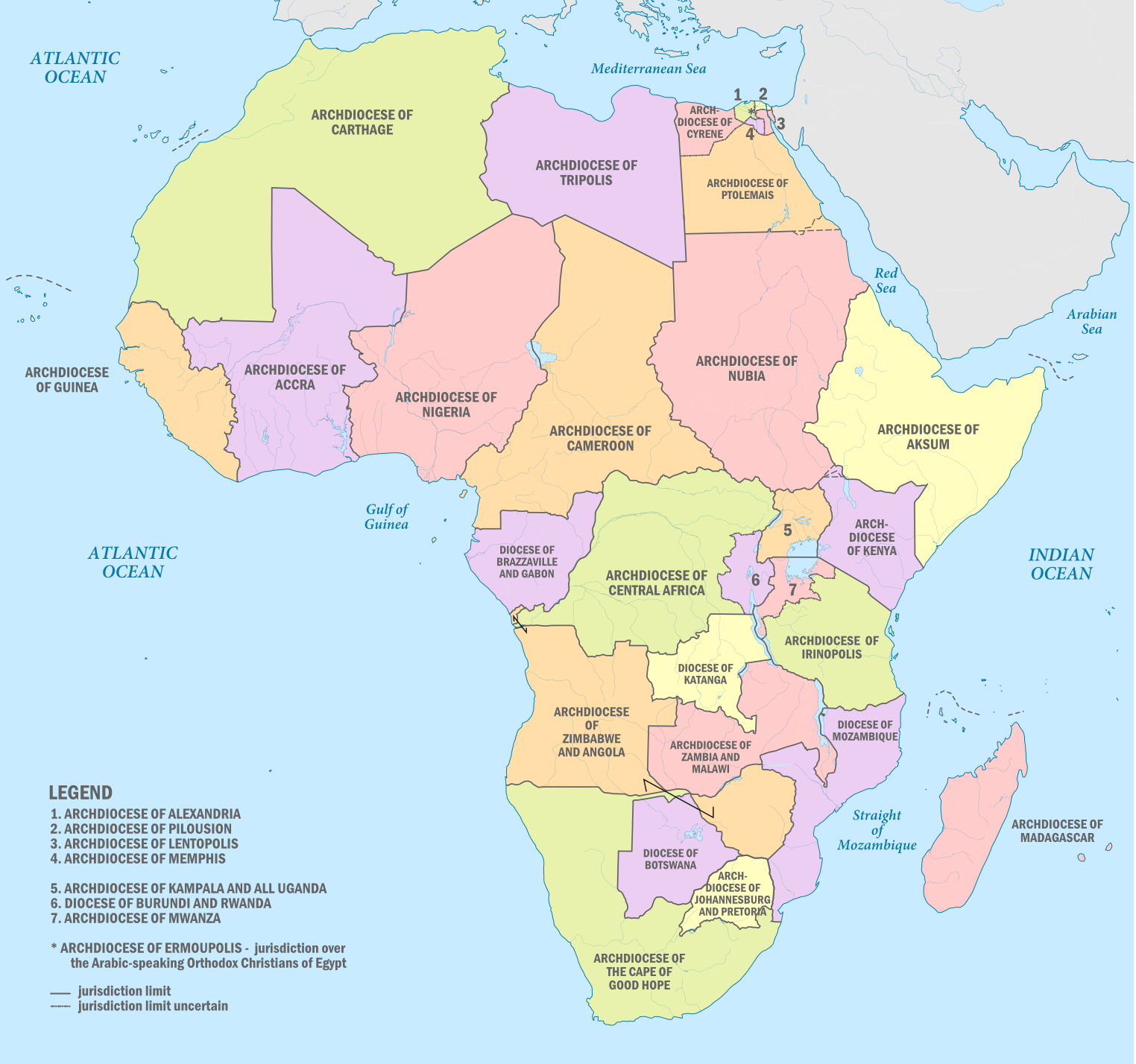
Archdioceses and Dioceses of the Eastern Orthodox Patriarchate of Alexandria and all Africa

From its first beginnings, Christianity in Madagascar was spreading slowly. First, because of the people being faithful followers of the tribal religions. Even converted followers may show great influence of ancient tribal worship. Also, many settlements are isolated, so that missionaries can't visit them very often and locals may return to their cults.

For many African countries, Eastern Orthodox Christianity was brought there by Greek traders. In 1953 in the capital Antananarivo, Greek colonists built an Eastern Orthodox temple. After the 1972 military coup, the church's priest was deported together with other foreigners.

Eastern Orthodoxy was first brought for the local population here in 1994 by hieromonk Nectarios (Kellis) who arrived from Australia. After 5 years here, there were more than 12 thousand Eastern Orthodox Christians and those preparing to be christened.

In Antananarivo, the capital, the temple of the Assumption of Mary was built, together with eparchial directorate and orphanage for several hundred children.

On 26 of March 1995, during the Cross-Bow Week, in the Assumption Cathedral, Metropolitan Zimbabwean Chrysostom ordained deacon Ioann Rikotondrazafi as a presbyter. He is the first Malagasy priest. He became a deacon in the capital of Zimbabwe, the city of Harare. He studied the ministry for three months before that.

The other local resident, Jean-Kristos Tsakanias, was sent to study in the seminary in Nairobi, Kenya.

On the island by 1995 were 63 Eastern Orthodox parishes, seven schools and 12 priests who were locals. The Eastern Orthodox Church was recognized by the government of Madagascar.

With the blessing of Patriarch Peter VII on 23 of September 1997 the Holy Synod of Alexandria Church elected Father Nectarios the first bishop of Madagascar. Madagascar became the independent eparchia, before that it was part of Zimbabwean metropolia.

The Eastern Orthodox mission guides several villages and settlements, some of them are fully converted to Eastern Orthodoxy. One of them is the village Ambovandramanesi. It is one of the first villages visited by Father Nectarios. It has one of the strongest Eastern Orthodox communities.

Later a medical ambulatory clinic was built on a plot of land gifted by Greek Consul. Here also the hierarch Nectarios planned to build a temple, a seminary, a woman cloister, and an eye clinic.

Bishop Nectarios also ordained the first Malagasy nun named Christodula.

In the villages and settlements people live in huts made of palm leaves; chapels and temples are usually of the same material. Local priests serve in these temples and chapels straggled in rural areas.

Father Nectarios died in a helicopter crash together with Patriarch Peter VII and 15 other people on 11 September 2004. They were heading to the Holy Mount Athos on board a Greek Army helicopter.

== See also ==
- Nectarios (Kellis) of Madagascar
- Patriarch Peter VII of Alexandria

== Sources ==
- Алмозис П., Анжуйкина Е. Православная миссия на Мадагаскаре. // Поместные Православные Церкви. М., 2004.
- The article was translated from a Russian article Православие на Мадагаскаре, where sources for the data are stated.
