= Silvano Bertini =

Italian boxer (1940–2021)

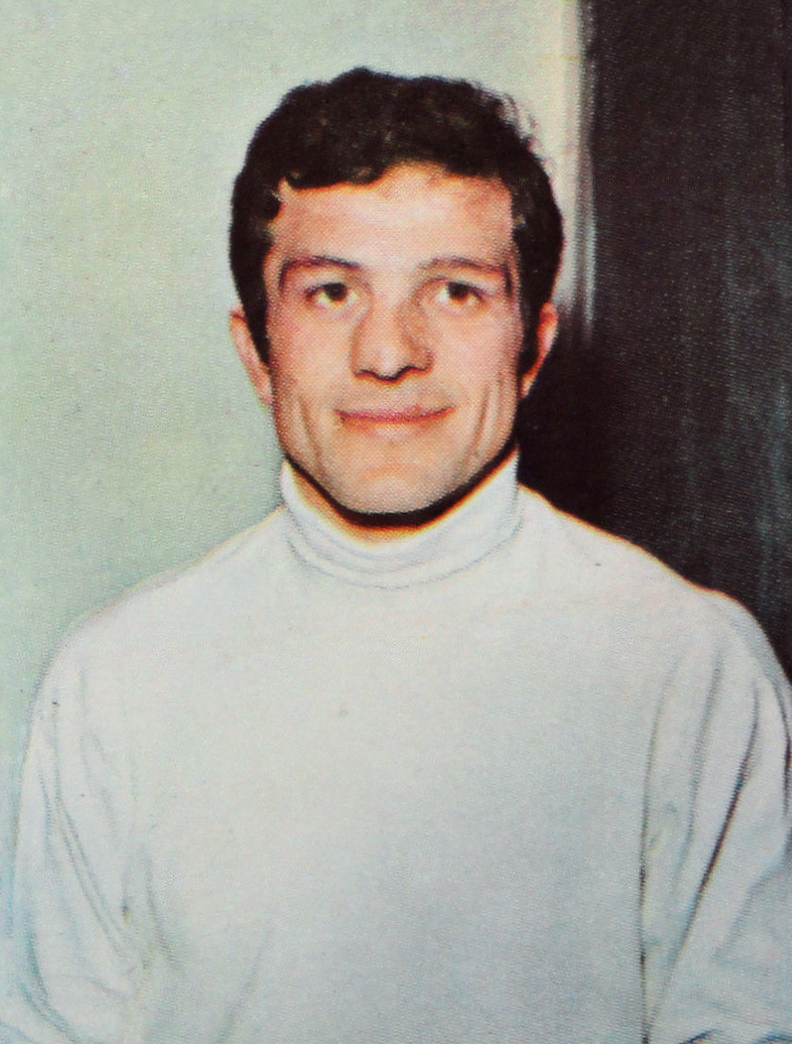
- Bertini c. 1969

Personal information
- Born: 27 March 1940 Signa, Italy
- Died: 27 June 2021 (aged 81) Florence, Italy
- Height: 170 cm (5 ft 7 in)
- Weight: Welterweight; Light-middleweight

Boxing career

Boxing record
- Total fights: 46
- Wins: 42
- Win by KO: 18
- Losses: 3
- Draws: 1
Medal record
Men's amateur boxing
Representing Italy
Olympic Games
Bronze medal – third place	1964 Tokyo	Welterweight
European Championships
Silver medal – second place	1963 Moscow	Welterweight
Mediterranean Games
Gold medal – first place	1963 Naples	Welterweight

Silvano Bertini (27 March 1940 – 27 June 2021) was an Italian boxer. As an amateur he won a silver medal at the 1963 European Championships and a bronze at the 1964 Summer Olympics in Tokyo. In 1965 he turned professional and was undefeated in his first 28 fights before losing to Jean Josselin in 1969. He retired in 1973 after failing to come out for the bell in the 12th round against Koichi Wajima for the WBA and WBC super-welterweight titles.

Bertini died on 27 June 2021, aged 81.
