= Juan Fabila Mendoza =

Mexican boxer (born 1944)

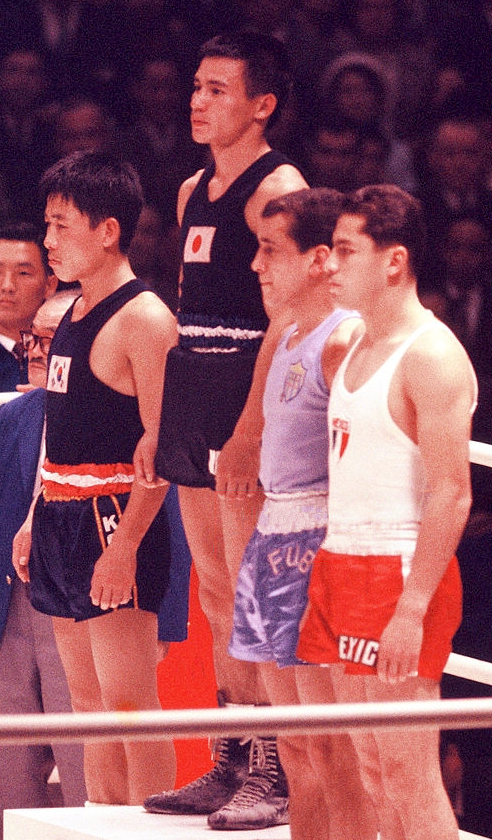
- Mendoza (right) at the 1964 Olympics

Personal information
- Born: 5 June 1944 (age 82) Mexico City, Mexico
- Height: 1.63 m (5 ft 4 in)
- Weight: 54 kg (119 lb)

Sport
- Sport: Boxing
Medal record
Representing Mexico
Olympic Games
Bronze medal – third place	1964 Tokyo	Bantamweight

Juan Fabila Mendoza (born 5 June 1944) is a Mexican former boxer who a bronze medal in the bantamweight category (– 54 kg) at the 1964 Summer Olympics. After that he turned professional and won his first five bouts in 1964–1971. He then lost twice by knockout and retired in 1973.

== 1964 Olympic results ==
Below is the record of Juan Fabila, a featherweight boxer who competed for Mexico in the 1964 Tokyo Olympics:

- Round of 32: defeated Sadegh Aliakbarzadeh (Iran) by decision, 3-2
- Round of 16: defeated Law Hon-Park (Hong Kong) by decision, 5-0
- Quarterfinal: defeated Oleg Grigoryev (Soviet Union) by decision, 3-2
- Semifinal: lost to Chung Shin-Cho (South Korea) by decision, 1-4 (was awarded bronze medal)
