= Nicolae Puiu =

Romanian boxer (1935-1970)

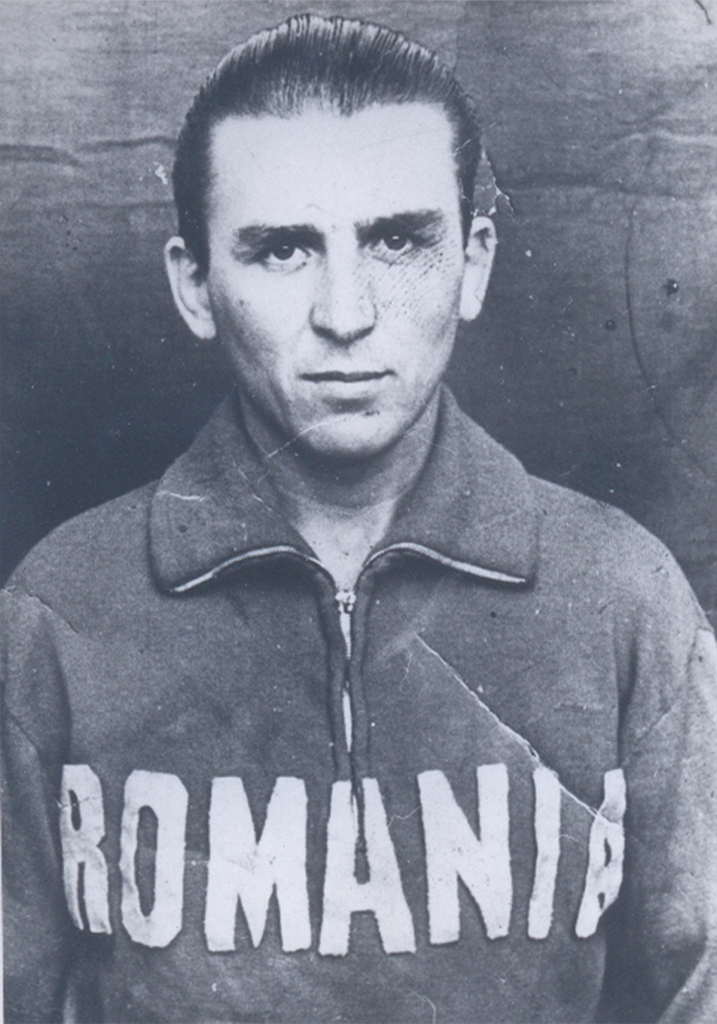

Personal information
- Nationality: Romanian
- Born: 4 December 1935 Reșița, Romania
- Died: 4 February 1970 (aged 34)

Sport
- Sport: Boxing
Medal record
Representing Romania
Romania National Amateur Boxing Championships
Silver medal – second place	1957 Bucharest	-51 kg
Gold medal – first place	1958 Bucharest	-51 kg
Silver medal – second place	1959 Bucharest	-51 kg
Gold medal – first place	1960 Bucharest	-54 kg
Silver medal – second place	1961 Bucharest	-54 kg
Silver medal – second place	1962 Bucharest	-54 kg
Gold medal – first place	1963 Bucharest	-54 kg
Gold medal – first place	1964 Bucharest	-54 kg
Silver medal – second place	1966 Bucharest	-54 kg
European Amateur Championships
Bronze medal – third place	1961 Belgrade	-51 kg
Bronze medal – third place	1963 Moscow	-54 kg

Nicolae Puiu (4 December 1935 – 4 February 1970) was a Romanian boxer. He competed at the 1960 Summer Olympics and the 1964 Summer Olympics. At the 1964 Summer Olympics, he defeated Cornelis van der Walt of Northern Rhodesia before losing to Louis Johnson of the United States.
