= Cherdchai Udompaichitkul =

Thai boxer

Personal information
- Born: December 16, 1941 (age 84) Nakhon Si Thammarat Province, Thailand
Medal record
Men's boxing
Representing Thailand
Asian Games
Gold medal – first place	1966 Bangkok	Bantamweight

Cherdchai Udompaichitkul (Thai: เชิดชัย อุดมไพจิตรกุล; RTGS: Choetchai Udomphaichitkun; born December 16, 1941) is a retired amateur boxer from Thailand, who won the gold medal at the 1966 Asian Games in the men's bantamweight (– 54 kg) division. He represented his native country twice at the Summer Olympics: in 1964 and 1968.
