= Roberto Caminero =

Cuban boxer (1945–2010)

Personal information
- Full name: Roberto Caminero Pérez
- Nickname: Chocolatico
- Born: 27 April 1945 Havana, Cuba
- Died: 31 August 2010 (aged 65) Santiago de Cuba, Cuba
- Height: 166 cm (5 ft 5 in)
- Weight: 60 kg (132 lb)

Sport
- Sport: Boxing
- Weight class: Bantamweight (-54 kg); Featherweight (-57 kg); Lightweight (-60 kg)
Medal record
Men's boxing
Representing Cuba
Pan American Games
Gold medal – first place	1963 São Paulo	Lightweight -60 kg
Central American and Caribbean Games
Bronze medal – third place	1962 Kingston	Bantamweight -54 kg
Silver medal – second place	1966 San Juan	Featherweight -57 kg

Roberto Caminero Pérez (Note: In this Spanish name, the first or paternal surname is Caminero and the second or maternal family name is Pérez.) (27 April 1945 – 31 August 2010) was a Cuban boxer. He competed at the 1964 Summer Olympics and the 1968 Summer Olympics.
