= Washington Rodríguez (boxer) =

Uruguayan boxer (1944–2014)

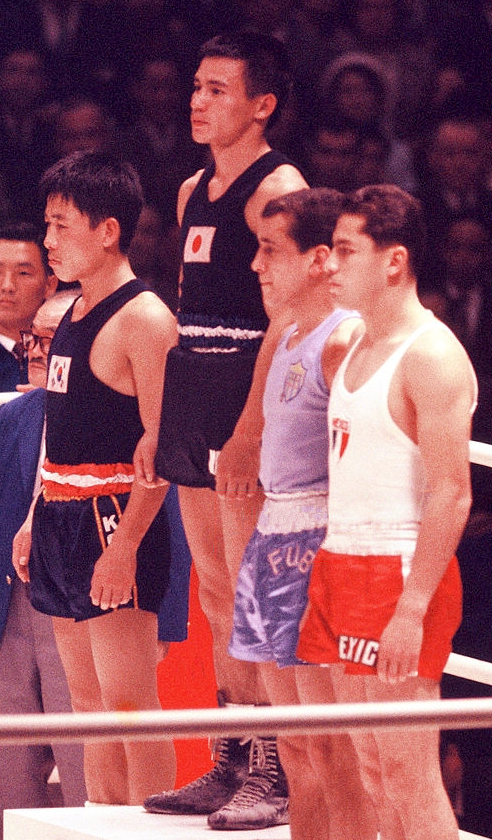
- Rodríguez (2nd from right) at the 1964 Olympics

Personal information
- Nickname: Cuerito
- Born: April 6, 1944 Montevideo, Uruguay
- Died: December 31, 2014 (aged 70) Montevideo, Uruguay
- Height: 1.59 m (5 ft 3 in)
- Weight: 54 kg (119 lb)

Sport
- Sport: Boxing
Medal record
Representing Uruguay
Olympic Games
Bronze medal – third place	1964 Tokyo	Bantamweight

Washington Rodríguez Medina (April 6, 1944 – 31 December 2014) was a Uruguayan boxer, who won a bronze medal in the bantamweight category (– 54 kg) at the 1964 Summer Olympics.

Earlier in 1962 Rodríguez won a bantamweight bronze medal at the Latin American Games. After the 1964 Olympics he turned professional, and retired in 1969 with a record of five wins (four by knockout) and one loss. He then worked at the National Bank of Uruguay.
