= Ričardas Tamulis =

Lithuanian boxer (1938–2008)

Personal information
- Born: 22 July 1938 Kaunas, Lithuania
- Died: 22 April 2008 (aged 69) Jonava, Lithuania
- Height: 177 cm (5 ft 10 in)

Sport
- Sport: Boxing
- Club: Žalgiris Kaunas
Medal record
Representing the Soviet Union
Olympic Games
Silver medal – second place	1964 Tokyo	-67 kg
European Amateur Championships
Gold medal – first place	1961 Belgrade	-67 kg
Gold medal – first place	1963 Moscow	-67 kg
Gold medal – first place	1965 East Berlin	-67 kg

Ričardas Tamulis (22 July 1938 – 22 April 2008) was an amateur Lithuanian welterweight boxer who won the European title in 1961, 1963 and 1965 and an Olympic silver medal in 1964.

Tamulis took up boxing in 1953 and won the Soviet welterweight title in 1959, 1961–62, 1964 and 1966, placing third in 1963 and 1967. He retired in 1967 with a record of 243 wins in 257 bouts and later coached boxers at his native club Žalgiris Kaunas. In the 1990s he was also active in Lithuanian politics. He died aged 69 after falling from an eighth-floor balcony.
