= Jürgen Blin =

German boxer (1943–2022)

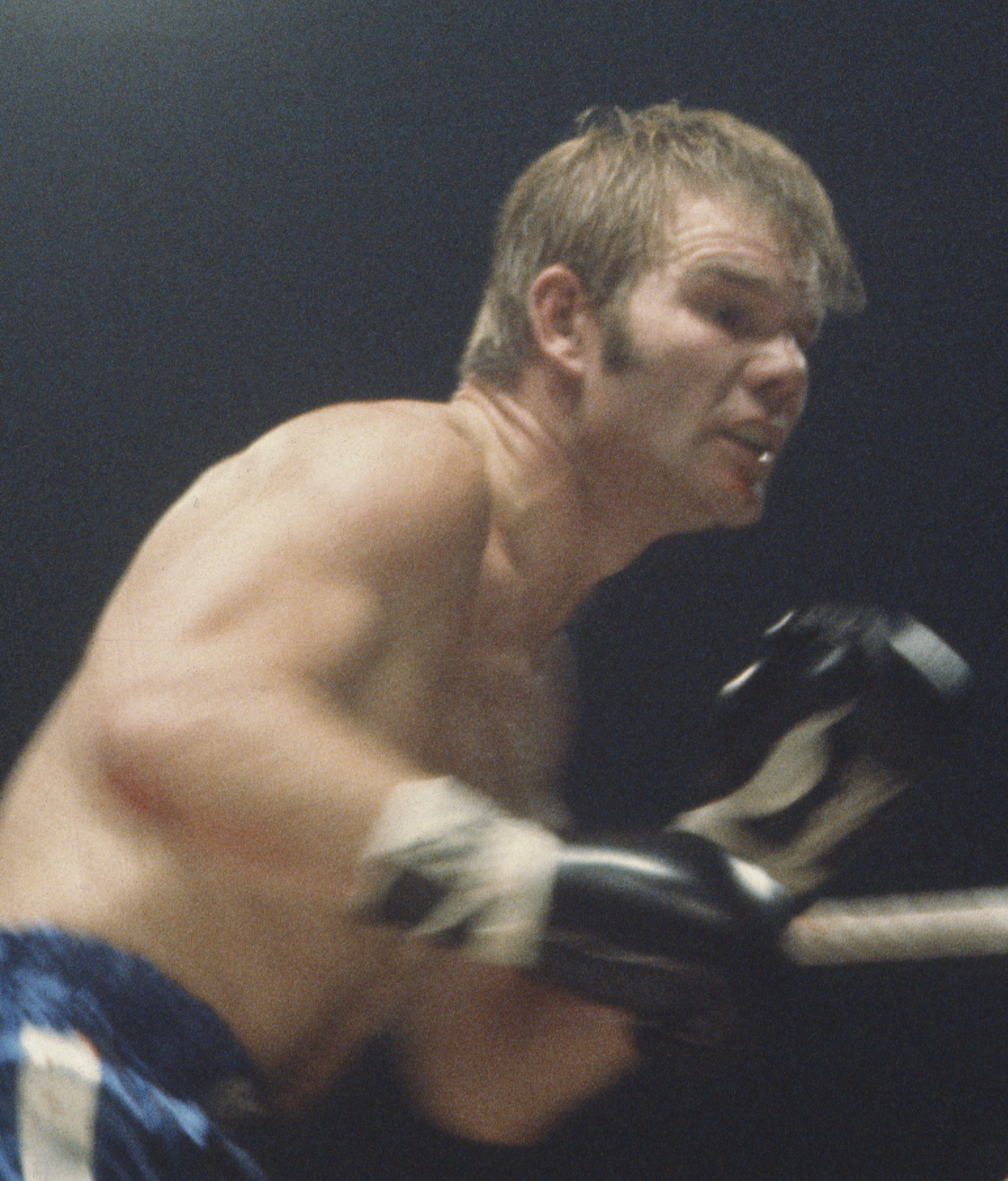
- Jürgen Blin in 1971
- Born: 7 April 1943; Fehmarn, Schleswig-Holstein, Prussia, Germany
- Died: 7 May 2022 (aged 79); Hamburg, Germany
- Boxing career
- Height: 1.85 m (6 ft 1 in)
- Weight: Heavyweight

Boxing record
- Total fights: 48
- Wins: 30
- Win by KO: 8
- Losses: 12
- Draws: 6

Jürgen Blin (24 April 1943 – 7 May 2022) was a mid-20th century German boxer, who was the Heavyweight Champion of Germany, and European Heavyweight Champion in 1972, and internationally represented the state of West Germany.

== Early life ==
Blin was born on the Baltic Sea island of Fehmarn on 24 April 1943 during World War II, and was a native of the North German city of Hamburg. While living in Hamburg he was a butcher before his boxing career.

== Boxing career ==
Blin's record in the ring was 30–12–6 with eight knockouts. He was greatly admired by German boxing fans for his toughness and stamina in the ring. He was briefly Heavyweight Champion of (West) Germany after defeating Gerhard Zech for the title (he had two draws with him previously).

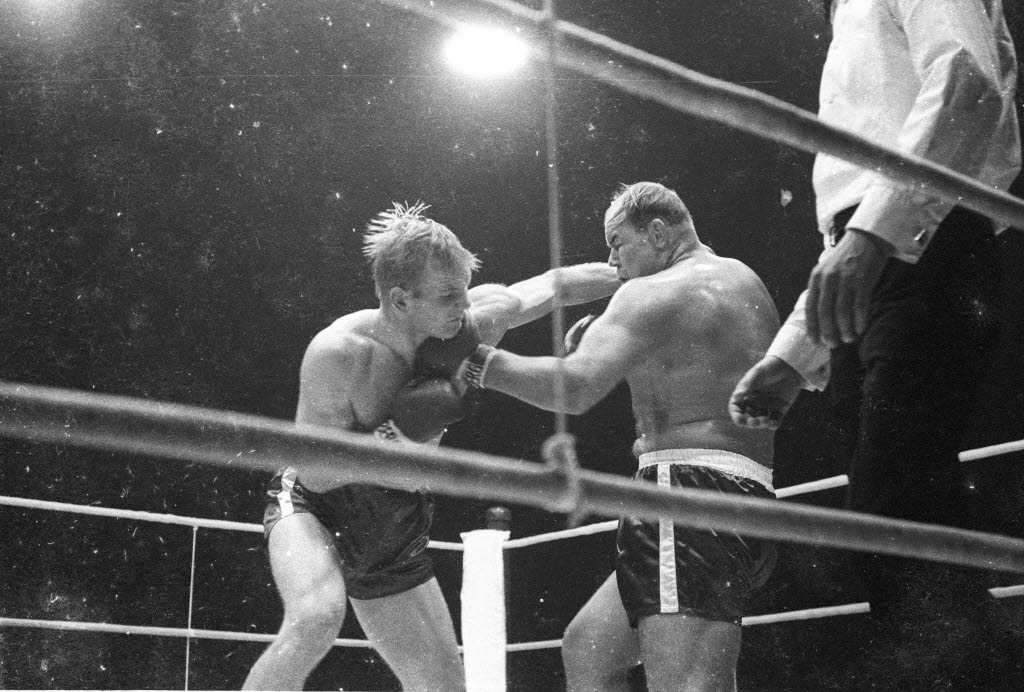
Jürgen Blin (left) against Peter Weiland (right) for the German Heavyweight Championship in Kiel, 1968

His first professional bout came against Klaus Krüger in October 1964. Blin won this bout, as well as the next five bouts against domestic opponents, and lost his first professional bout in June 1965 to Ray Patterson in Jordal Amfi.

Blin lost a decision to Joe Bugner in May 1971 when fighting for the European Heavyweight title. Blin later won the title in June 1972, his greatest triumph in the ring, when he beat Jose Urtain (who had beaten Blin for the same title in June 1970). However, in October 1972, Blin once again faced Bugner who regained the title by knocking the German out in the eighth round.

On 26 December 1971, he fought the American boxer Muhammad Ali at Hallenstadion Arena, in Zürich, Switzerland, Blin being knocked out 2 minutes and 12 seconds into the seventh round.

== Later years ==
Blin was co-author with Stephen Brunt of a chapter in a book titled Facing Ali (2002), about his 1971 contest with the United States champion boxer. He died of kidney failure at a hospital in Hamburg on 7 May 2022, aged 79.

== Professional boxing record ==
30 Wins (8 knockouts, 22 decisions), 12 Losses (4 knockouts, 8 decisions), 6 Draws
Result	Record	Opponent	Type	Round	Date	Location	Notes
Loss	24-1	(United States) Ron Lyle	TKO	2	4 October 1973	(United States) Denver, Colorado	Referee stopped the bout at 1:01 of the second round.
Win	0-9	(Venezuela) Danny Machado	TKO	7	3 February 1973	(West Germany) Kiel, Schleswig-Holstein	
Loss	39-4-1	(United Kingdom) Joe Bugner	KO	8	10 October 1972	(United Kingdom) Royal Albert Hall, Kensington, London	EBU Heavyweight Title.
Win	39-4-2	(Spain) Jose Manuel Urtain	PTS	15	9 June 1972	(Spain) Madrid	EBU Heavyweight Title. 73-68, 72-70, 71-67.
Win	21-13-1	(Canada) Charles E. Chase	KO	5	5 May 1972	(West Germany) Hamburg	
Loss	33-1	(United States) Muhammad Ali	KO	7	26 December 1971	(Switzerland) Hallenstadion, Zürich	Blin knocked out at 2:12 of the seventh round.
Win	18-20-4	(United States) George "Scrap Iron" Johnson	TKO	2	1 October 1971	(West Germany) Hamburg	
Loss	32-2-1	(United Kingdom) Joe Bugner	SD	15	11 May 1971	(United Kingdom) Empire Pool, Wembley, London	EBU Heavyweight Title. 69-70, 70-67, 71-73.
Win	24-14-3	(Mexico) Manuel "Pulgarcito" Ramos	PTS	10	2 April 1971	(West Germany) Cologne, North Rhine-Westphalia	
Win	21-22	(Peru) Roberto Davila	PTS	10	26 February 1971	(West Germany) Hamburg	
Win	7-7-2	(Italy) Vasco Faustino	PTS	8	5 February 1971	(West Germany) Frankfurt, Hesse	
Win	13-16-3	(United States) Charley Polite	PTS	10	2 January 1971	(West Germany) Wiesbaden, Hesse	
Win	7-6	(United States) Sylvester Dullaire	KO	8	17 November 1970	(West Germany) Cologne, North Rhine-Westphalia	
Win	10-7-3	(United States) Billy Joiner	PTS	10	9 October 1970	(West Germany) Hamburg	
Loss	30-0	(Spain) Jose Manuel Urtain	PTS	15	22 June 1970	(Spain) Barcelona, Catalonia	EBU Heavyweight Title.
Win	23-8-4	(United States) Ray Patterson	PTS	10	13 February 1970	(West Germany) Ernst-Merck-Halle, Hamburg	
Win	30-9-6	(West Germany) Wilhelm Von Homburg	PTS	10	12 December 1969	(West Germany) Sporthalle, Cologne, North Rhine-Westphalia	
Win	33-9-3	(West Germany) Gerhard Zech	PTS	10	21 November 1969	(West Germany) Ernst-Merck-Halle, Hamburg	
Win	17-17-3	(United States) David E. Bailey	PTS	10	12 September 1969	(West Germany) Ernst-Merck-Halle, Hamburg	
Win	41-13-5	(Italy) Giulio Rinaldi	PTS	10	29 May 1969	(West Germany) Grugahalle, Essen, North Rhine-Westphalia	
Draw	3-2-1	(Guinea) Macan Keita	PTS	8	29 November 1968	(West Germany) Festhalle Frankfurt, Frankfurt, Hesse	
Loss	20-3-2	(West Germany) Peter Weiland	PTS	10	1 November 1968	(West Germany) Ostseehalle, Kiel, Schleswig-Holstein	Germany BDB Heavyweight Title.
Loss	32-6-5	(Italy) Piero Tomasoni	DQ	2	29 September 1968	(Italy) Brescia, Lombardy	EBU Heavyweight Title Eliminator.
Win	33-7-3	(West Germany) Gerhard Zech	PTS	12	11 May 1968	(West Germany) Deutschlandhalle, Charlottenburg, West Berlin	Germany BDB Heavyweight Title.
Win	15-12-3	(Jamaica) Lloyd Walford	PTS	8	8 March 1968	(West Germany) Sporthalle, Cologne, North Rhine-Westphalia	
Win	22-11-3	(Brazil) Renato Moraes	PTS	10	17 February 1968	(West Germany) Deutschlandhalle, Charlottenburg, West Berlin	
Win	18-3	(Italy) Giuseppe Ros	PTS	8	15 December 1967	(West Germany) Sporthalle, Cologne, North Rhine-Westphalia	
Loss	33-3-3	(Italy) Piero Del Papa	PTS	10	11 November 1967	(West Germany) Deutschlandhalle, Charlottenburg, West Berlin	
Draw	19-11-3	(Argentina) Jose Menno	PTS	8	8 September 1967	(West Germany) Sporthalle, Cologne, North Rhine-Westphalia	
Win	16-11-3	(Socialist Federal Republic of Yugoslavia) Ivan Prebeg	KO	5	28 April 1967	(West Germany) Sporthalle, Cologne, North Rhine-Westphalia	
Draw	32-6-2	(West Germany) Gerhard Zech	PTS	12	24 February 1967	(West Germany) Sporthalle, Cologne, North Rhine-Westphalia	Germany BDB Heavyweight Title.
Draw	32-6-1	(West Germany) Gerhard Zech	PTS	12	18 November 1966	(West Germany) Sporthalle, Cologne, North Rhine-Westphalia	Germany BDB Heavyweight Title.
Loss	6-0-2	(Italy) Giulio Saraudi	PTS	8	23 September 1966	(Italy) Palazzetto dello Sport, Rome, Lazio	
Draw	40-9-3	(Italy) Giulio Rinaldi	PTS	10	2 September 1966	(West Germany) Mungersdorfer Stadion, Cologne, North Rhine-Westphalia	
Win	18-15-6	(West Germany) Ossi Buettner	KO	8	15 June 1966	(West Germany) Festhalle Frankfurt, Frankfurt, Hesse	
Win	6-5-1	(West Germany) Roland Graetz	PTS	6	14 May 1966	(West Germany) Westfalenhallen, Dortmund, North Rhine-Westphalia	
Win	10-27-2	(Belgium) Andre Wyns	PTS	6	15 April 1966	(West Germany) Ernst-Merck-Halle, Hamburg	
Draw	1-0	(Finland) Raimo Nisula	PTS	8	18 March 1966	(Sweden) Masshallen, Gothenburg	
Loss	8-8-2	(France) Joseph Juvillier	PTS	8	2 December 1965	(West Germany) Westfalenhallen, Dortmund, North Rhine-Westphalia	
Loss	46-25-6	(Netherlands) Wim Snoek	RTD	6	16 October 1965	(West Germany) Westfalenhallen, Dortmund, North Rhine-Westphalia	
Win	10-10-4	(Netherlands) Willem Bomber	PTS	6	10 September 1965	(West Germany) Ernst-Merck-Halle, Hamburg	
Loss	10-2	(United States) Ray Patterson	PTS	6	21 June 1965	(Norway) Jordal Amfi, Oslo	
Win	7-10-2	(Belgium) Valere Mahau	PTS	4	9 April 1965	(West Germany) Ernst-Merck-Halle, Hamburg	
Win	0-1	(West Germany) Manfred Schlesinger	PTS	6	27 March 1965	(West Germany) Westfalenhallen, Dortmund, North Rhine-Westphalia	
Win	3-1	(Italy) Danilo Zoratti	KO	3	30 January 1965	(West Germany) Stadthalle Bremen, Bremen	
Win	1-6-1	(Austria) Friedrich Mayr	KO	1	16 January 1965	(West Germany) Westfalenhallen, Dortmund, North Rhine-Westphalia	
Win	1-7	(West Germany) Manfred Ackers	PTS	4	5 December 1964	(West Germany) Sporthalle, Cologne, North Rhine-Westphalia	
Win	--	(West Germany) Klaus Krueger	PTS	4	16 October 1964	(West Germany) Sporthalle, Cologne, North Rhine-Westphalia	
