= Gennadiy Shatkov =

Russian boxer

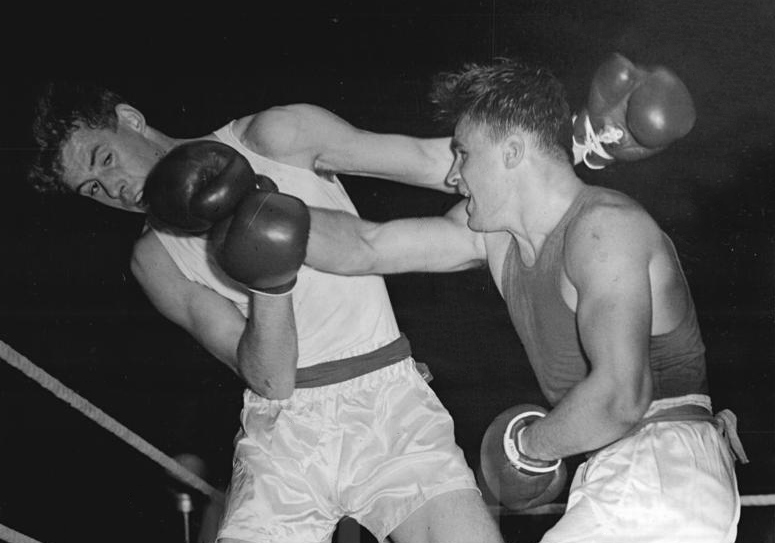
- Shatkov (right) v. Bruce Wells, 1955

Medal record

Men's Boxing

Representing the Soviet Union

Olympic Games
Gold medal – first place	1956 Melbourne	Middleweight

European Amateur Championships
Gold medal – first place	1955 West Berlin	Middleweight
Gold medal – first place	1959 Lucerne	Middleweight

Gennadi Ivanovich Shatkov (Russian: Геннадий Иванович Шатков, May 27, 1932 – January 14, 2009) was a Russian boxer from the USSR, who competed in the Middleweight division (– 75 kg) during the major part of his career.

== Biography ==
Shatkov was born in Leningrad and began boxing at 12 at Zhdanov Young Pioneer Palace in Leningrad, where he was trained by Ivan Pavlovich Osipov. His first success was the 3rd place at the 1949 USSR Youth Championship in Rostov on Don. Shatkov trained at Burevestnik in Leningrad. He became Honoured Master of Sports of the USSR in 1957 and was awarded the Order of Lenin in 1957. During his career he won 215 fights out of 227. He won the Middleweight (75 kg) gold medal at the 1956 Melbourne Olympic games. He also competed at the 1960 Summer Olympics in the Light Heavyweight division (– 81 kg) but lost to 18-year-old Cassius Marcellus Clay Jr. (later known as Muhammad Ali) in the quarterfinals. Shatkov won gold medals at 1955 European Championship and 1959 European Championship, became USSR Champion in 1955, 1956 and 1958, and won gold medal in the I Summer Spartakiad of the Peoples of the USSR in 1956.

Along with his sports career Shatkov had a notable scientific one. After graduating from a secondary school he entered Leningrad State University in 1951, received Candidate of Judicial Sciences degree there in 1962, became a docent of the Department of Theory and History of State and Law and was appointed prorector of the university in 1964.

Three of his other wins were against illnesses. He had an acute stroke in 1969 and two strokes in 1988. It took him five years to recover from the first one. He managed to restore impellent activity and speech after all three strokes. During years that passed after the first stroke he wrote 40 scientific papers and three books.

He died in Saint Petersburg on January 14, 2009, aged 76.

== Olympic results ==
Below are the results of Gennadiy Shatkov, a middleweight boxer from the Soviet Union, who competed at the 1956 Melbourne Olympics:

- Round of 16: Defeated Ralph Hosack (Canada) points
- Quarterfinal: Defeated Giulio Rinaldi (Italy) walk-over
- Semifinal: Defeated Víctor Zalazar (Argentina) KO 2
- Final: Defeated Ramón Tapia (Chile) KO 1 (won gold medal)

Below are the results of Gennadiy Shatkov, a light heavyweight boxer from the Soviet Union, who competed at the 1960 Rome Olympics:

- Round of 32: bye
- Round of 16: Defeated Ray Cillien (LUX) points
- Quarterfinal: Lost to Cassius Marcellus Clay Jr. (USA) points
