= Wilhelm von Homburg =

German boxer and actor (1940–2004)

- Born: Norbert Grupe; 25 August 1940; Berlin, Germany
- Died: 10 March 2004 (aged 63); Puerto Vallarta, Jalisco, Mexico
- Occupations: Boxer, actor, professional wrestler
- Years active: 1960−2000
- Boxing career
- Height: 6 ft 1 in (185 cm)
- Weight: Heavyweight; Light heavyweight
- Stance: Orthodox

Boxing record
- Total fights: 47
- Wins: 30
- Win by KO: 24
- Losses: 11
- Draws: 6
- Professional wrestling career
- Ring name(s): Viking #2; Prinz Wilhelm von Homburg
- Trained by: Richard Grupe
- Debut: 1960
- Retired: 1962

Norbert Grupe (August 25, 1940 – March 10, 2004), known outside Germany by his stage name Wilhelm von Homburg, was a German professional boxer, professional wrestler, and actor. He competed in the heavyweight and light heavyweight categories from 1962 to 1970, with a final record of 30 wins, 11 losses, and 6 draws.

After retiring from boxing, Homburg found a second career as a film actor, appearing as supporting villains in several high-profile Hollywood films of the 1980s and 1990s, including the henchman James in Die Hard (1988) and Vigo the Carpathian in Ghostbusters II (1989). He also played a pimp in Werner Herzog's Stroszek (1977).

Off-screen, Homburg was known for his combative personal life and multiple runs-ins with the law. He was the subject of the 2002 documentary Der Boxprinz.

== Early life ==
Norbert Grupe was born in Berlin on August 25, 1940. He was the son of Richard Grupe (1915 – August 5, 1988), who worked as a baker in Nazi Germany, and later become both a championship-winning boxer and a local policeman who worked at the Buchenwald concentration camp. Richard would later say of this period, "I was never a Nazi. I never joined the party. I was not in the Hitler Youth...I was a pastryman...I have not much luck with the Jewish people. But I never hated them. Never hated them. I'm very sorry for what Hitler did to the Jewish people." After the war, Richard boxed professionally from 1946 to 1952, earning a record of 26 wins (20 by knockout), 8 losses, and 6 draws. He then toured Europe as a professional wrestler.

Norbert was born to a girlfriend of Richard's, while Richard's first wife gave birth to Grupe's brother Winfried. Richard's second wife Ursula, much younger and closer in age to Norbert Grupe himself, gave birth to Grupe's sister, Rona. Ursula left the family five years later. According to Rona, Grupe exhibited a bitter jealousy toward Winfried, because Winfried's mother was a daily presence for him, whereas Grupe's absent mother would not even speak to him. Years later, when Rona was in her mid-teens, Richard informed her that at some point in 1959, the year prior to Rona's birth, Richard was away from home, most likely on a wrestling trip, and Ursula was home alone. Grupe climbed the fire escape into the house and raped her. Richard said it was possible that Grupe was Rona's biological father. Decades later, however, when Richard was in a coma near his death, Rona had a blood test, which proved that Richard was her father.

In his youth, Grupe worked as a meatpacker, butcher, longshoreman, and a waiter. By the time he finished school, Grupe, who had begun training in boxing at age 10, had won several amateur boxing matches. He was trained in boxing and professional wrestling by his father Richard.

== Professional wrestling career ==
Around 1960, Richard emigrated to the United States to further his wrestling career, and Grupe, who stood at 6'3" and 227 pounds by this time, would soon follow, spending time at California's notable Venice weight pen, where he became acquainted with future film star Arnold Schwarzenegger. The father and son duo would don Viking costumes, with which they were billed as the tag-team by the name of The Vikings, wrestling at the Los Angeles Coliseum and Madison Square Garden.

They subsequently changed their name to the Von Homburg Brothers, under which they performed as heels for less than a hundred dollars a night in total. Grupe thought his last name sounded too much like the word groupie, and changed it to 'Prinz Wilhelm von Homburg'. He sometimes wore a monocle and German eagle. He would later regret using it in Hollywood, saying, "In an industry that was ruled by the Jews, it was really dumb to call myself 'von Homburg.' Who do they think that is? A Nazi nobleman." After their wrestling partnership ended, the father and son grew estranged.

== Boxing career ==
Von Homburg switched careers to boxing in 1962, employing the showmanship and the boastful, cocky persona he had developed as a wrestler. He won 16 of 21 professional fights in the U.S., fighting throughout California as a light heavyweight before traveling across the U.S. and then his native Germany where he wore fur coats, smoked cigars, and taunted referees and crowds in a way that stunned the normally sedate German boxing world. One reporter for Der Spiegel ranked Von Homburg as seventh in the world. He grew his blonde hair over his ears, for which he was nicknamed the "Beatle Boxer."

Von Homburg got his first championship match in 1966 against Piero del Papa for the EBU Regional Light Heavyweight title in Berlin. Homburg was disqualified in the eleventh round, after having knocked out Del Papa, because the referee declared a subtle head movement by Von Homburg to have been an illegal headbutt. The match would haunt Von Homburg for the rest of his life, and he would blame it on bias on the part of the referee, saying, "I was the best thing German boxing had back then, and then I had a 70-year-old Frenchman as the referee. We all know what the Germans did to his parents and his sister."

After losing his next three fights, von Homburg retired from boxing in 1970 at age 30, and went to live in St. Pauli Kiez, a red-light district of Hamburg, developing a reputation in that area's underground, where he associated with pimps and Hells Angels, and engaged in a number of affairs with both men and women. He also used drugs and alcohol to excess.

== Acting career ==
Throughout his boxing career, von Homburg appeared in bit roles in various films and television shows. In "The Promoter", the April 25, 1964, episode of Gunsmoke for example, he played a boxer named Otto who is offered a large bribe to throw a fight. He and his brother Winfried appeared as twins in the 1966 Alfred Hitchcock film Torn Curtain. He guest-starred on three episodes of The Wild Wild West. In 1970, he had a minor role in the West German comedy Gentlemen in White Vests.

After his in-ring retirement and a stint in prison, von Homburg attempted to pursue an acting career in earnest. German director Werner Herzog, who had seen him box in his youth, cast him as a bullying pimp in his 1977 film Stroszek. Herzog commented, "The Prince was so clear and intelligent and radiated, at the same time, a feeling of danger that absolutely terrified me. He was almost like a German Mike Tyson."

A decade later, Von Homburg was cast as James, one of Hans Gruber's henchmen in the 1988 action thriller Die Hard, who dies after Bruce Willis' character detonates plastic explosives down an elevator shaft. Von Homburg's biggest role came at age 50, when he was cast as the primary villain in the 1989 comedy sequel Ghostbusters II, playing Vigo the Carpathian, a 16th/17th century tyrant and sorcerer whose soul is released from an old painting. The character's full name was Vigo Von Homburg Deutschendorf, which paid homage to the name he had chosen as a performer. The film was released less than a year after Von Homburg's father Richard died, though he had not reconciled with his father or sister.

His last major role was as Charles Macum Diggs, a vegetative ex-boxer in the comedy Diggstown, which was a commercial flop.

== Later life and death ==
Von Homburg spent the last years of his life effectively homeless, alternating between sleeping at a YMCA, in the homes of friends, or in his van.

He developed prostate cancer, and following its metastasis to his pelvis, spine, and brain, he went to the home of his friend Walter Staudinger in Puerto Vallarta, where he spent his final days.

== Documentary ==
Von Homburg was the subject of the 2002 German documentary Der Boxprinz ("The Boxing Prince"), directed by Gerd Kroske.

== Professional boxing record ==
30 Wins (24 knockouts, 6 decisions), 11 Losses (2 knockouts, 8 decisions, 1 DQ), 6 Draws
Result	Record	Opponent	Type	Round	Date	Location	Notes
Loss	30–11–6	(West Germany) Rüdiger Schmidtke	PTS	10	December 11, 1970	(West Germany) Cologne, North Rhine-Westphalia	
Loss	30–10–6	(West Germany) Jürgen Blin	PTS	10	December 12, 1969	(West Germany) Sporthalle, Cologne, North Rhine-Westphalia	
Loss	30–9–6	(West Germany) Rüdiger Schmidtke	PTS	10	November 14, 1969	(West Germany) Festhalle Frankfurt, Frankfurt, Hesse	
Loss	30–8–6	(Argentina) Oscar Bonavena	TKO	3	June 20, 1969	(West Germany) Sportpalast, Schoeneberg, West Berlin	
Win	30–7–6	(Italy) Giulio Rinaldi	TKO	7	April 2, 1969	(West Germany) Sportpalast, Schoeneberg, West Berlin	
Loss	29–7–6	(Italy) Giulio Rinaldi	PTS	10	February 14, 1969	(West Germany) Ernst Merck Halle, Hamburg	
Win	29–6–6	(Italy) Giulio Rinaldi	TKO	5	January 3, 1969	(West Germany) Sportpalast, Schoeneberg, West Berlin	
Win	28–6–6	(West Germany) Gerhard Zech	PTS	10	November 8, 1968	(West Germany) Ernst Merck Halle, Hamburg	Germany BDB Heavyweight Title Eliminator.
Win	27–6–6	(Aruba) Franklin Arrindel	KO	3	September 18, 1968	(Austria) Hohe Warte Stadium, Vienna	
Win	26–6–6	(West Germany) Rudolf Nehring	TKO	8	August 30, 1968	(West Germany) Sportpalast, Schoeneberg, West Berlin	
Loss	25–6–6	(United States) David E. Bailey	PTS	10	April 11, 1968	(West Germany) Sportpalast, Schoeneberg, West Berlin	
Win	25–5–6	(France) Paul Roux	KO	5	December 15, 1967	(West Germany) Circus Krone Building, Munich, Bavaria	
Draw	24–5–6	(United States) Ray Patterson	PTS	10	May 3, 1967	(West Germany) Westfalenhallen, Dortmund, North Rhine-Westphalia	
Win	24–5–5	(United States) Archie McBride	KO	9	December 9, 1966	(West Germany) Festhalle Frankfurt, Frankfurt, Hesse	
Loss	23–5–5	(Italy) Piero Del Papa	DQ	11	November 19, 1966	(West Germany) Deutschlandhalle, Charlottenburg, West Berlin	EBU Light Heavyweight Title.
Draw	23–4–5	(West Germany) Erich Schöppner	PTS	10	May 14, 1966	(West Germany) Westfalenhallen, Dortmund, North Rhine-Westphalia	
Draw	23–4–4	(United States) Archie McBride	PTS	10	May 28, 1965	(West Germany) Deutschlandhalle, Charlottenburg, West Berlin	
Win	23–4–3	(Netherlands) Bas van Duivenbode	KO	4	April 29, 1965	(West Germany) Neue Sporthalle, Hannover, Lower Saxony	
Win	22–4–3	(Argentina) Jose Angel Manzur	TKO	8	April 2, 1965	(Austria) Stadthalle, Vienna	
Win	21–4–3	(West Germany) Ulli Ritter	TKO	6	February 20, 1965	(West Germany) Ostseehalle, Kiel, Schleswig-Holstein	
Loss	20–4–3	(Italy) Piero Tomasoni	PTS	10	January 16, 1965	(West Germany) Westfalenhallen, Dortmund, North Rhine-Westphalia	
Win	20–3–3	(France) Joseph Syoz	TKO	10	December 5, 1964	(West Germany) Sporthalle, Cologne, North Rhine-Westphalia	
Win	19–3–3	(Netherlands) Paul Kraus	KO	3	November 27, 1964	(West Germany) Ostseehalle, Kiel, Schleswig-Holstein	
Win	18–3–3	(Sweden) Lars Olaf Norling	TKO	9	November 6, 1964	(West Germany) Ernst Merck Halle, Hamburg	
Win	17–3–3	(France) Jean Huiban	KO	6	May 29, 1964	(West Germany) Weser-Ems Halle, Oldenburg, Lower Saxony	
Draw	16–3–3	(West Germany) Ulli Ritter	PTS	10	May 8, 1964	(West Germany) Ernst Merck Halle, Hamburg	
Win	16–3–2	(United States) Roy Crear	KO	5	April 7, 1964	(United States) Stockyards Coliseum, Oklahoma City	
Win	15–3–2	(United States) Bob McKinney	TKO	9	January 6, 1964	(United States) New York Coliseum, Bronx, New York	
Win	14–3–2	(United States) Monroe Ratliff	SD	10	November 18, 1963	(United States) Santa Monica Civic Auditorium, Santa Monica, California	7–3, 8–1, 3–6.
Loss	13–3–2	(United States) Billy Stephan	PTS	10	September 19, 1963	(United States) Olympic Auditorium, Los Angeles, California	4–7.
Loss	13–2–2	(United States) Chuck Leslie	PTS	10	July 23, 1963	(United States) San Diego Coliseum, San Diego, California	
Win	13–1–2	(United States) Bobby Sand	TKO	9	June 24, 1963	(United States) Moulin Rouge, Hollywood, California	Referee stopped the bout at 1:09 of the ninth round.
Draw	12–1–2	(United States) Tommy Merrill	PTS	6	June 1, 1963	(United States) Las Vegas Convention Center, Las Vegas, Nevada	
Win	12–1–1	(United States) Bobby Sand	TKO	9	May 20, 1963	(United States) Moulin Rouge, Hollywood, California	Referee stopped the bout at 2:29 of the ninth round.
Win	11–1–1	(United States) Pete Gonzales	KO	3	March 25, 1963	(United States) Moulin Rouge, Hollywood, California	
Win	10–1–1	(Canada) Gus Calf Robe	KO	6	February 25, 1963	(United States) Moulin Rouge, Hollywood, California	
Win	9–1–1	(United States) Clifford Gray	TKO	1	February 19, 1963	(United States) San Diego Coliseum, San Diego, California	Referee stopped the bout at 2:35 of the first round.
Win	8–1–1	(United States) Bob Mumford	KO	6	February 15, 1963	(United States) Olympic Auditorium, Los Angeles, California	
Win	7–1–1	(United States) Yancy D Smith	UD	8	January 22, 1963	(United States) San Diego Coliseum, San Diego, California	5–2, 5–2, 6–2.
Win	6–1–1	(United States) Yancy D Smith	PTS	8	January 15, 1963	(United States) San Diego Coliseum, San Diego, California	6–3.
Win	5–1–1	(United States) Clifford Gray	PTS	6	December 18, 1962	(United States) San Diego Coliseum, San Diego, California	
Win	4–1–1	(United States) John L Davey	PTS	6	December 14, 1962	(United States) Olympic Auditorium, Los Angeles, California	
Loss	3–1–1	(United States) Freeman Hardin	KO	3	October 25, 1962	(United States) Olympic Auditorium, Los Angeles, California	
Win	3–0–1	(United States) Al Cummings	KO	3	September 21, 1962	(United States) Olympic Auditorium, Los Angeles, California	
Win	2–0–1	(United States) Tony Fern	KO	3	August 24, 1962	(United States) Olympic Auditorium, Los Angeles, California	
Win	1–0–1	(United States) Bob Brown	KO	2	August 16, 1962	(United States) San Diego Coliseum, San Diego, California	
Draw	0–0–1	(United States) Sam Wyatt	PTS	4	July 20, 1962	(United States) Los Angeles Sports Arena, Los Angeles, California	

== Filmography ==
=== Film ===
Year	Title	Role	Notes
1965	Morituri	Crew Member	Uncredited
1966	The Last of the Secret Agents?	GGI Agent	
1966	Torn Curtain	Blonde Twin in Bus	Uncredited
1967	Hotel Clausewitz	The American	
1968	The Devil's Brigade	Fritz	
1968	The Hell with Heroes	Hans	
1968	The Wrecking Crew	Gregor	
1970	Gentlemen in White Vests	Max Graf	
1976	The Swiss Conspiracy	Hitman in Santa Claus Costume	Uncredited
1977	Stroszek	Pimp	
1988	Die Hard	James	
1989	The Package	Lt. Koch	
1989	Ghostbusters II	Vigo the Carpathian	
1990	Midnight Cabaret	Juan Carlos	
1991	Night of the Warrior	Bike	
1991	Eye of the Storm	The Killer	
1992	Diggstown	Charles Macum Diggs	
1994	The Silence of the Hams	Maitre D'	
1994	In the Mouth of Madness	Simon	
2002	Der Boxprinz	Himself	documentary film final on-screen appearance

=== Television ===
Year	Title	Role	Notes
1964	Gunsmoke	Otto	Episode: "The Promoter"
1966	T.H.E. Cat	Tony	Episode: "To Kill a Priest"
1966	Jericho	German Sergeant	Episode: "Panic in the Piazza"
1967	The Invaders	Injured Alien	Episode: "Labyrinth"
1967-1968	The Wild Wild West	Herr Hess / Abel Garrison S3 E14/ Gunther Pearse	Episodes: "The Night of the Tottering Tontine", "The Night of the Iron Fist" & "The Night of the Big Blackmail"
2000	Rosa Roth	Schorsch	Episode: "Tod eines Bullen"
