= Boxing at the 1956 Summer Olympics – Middleweight =

Olympic boxing tournament

Middleweight boxing at the Games of the XVI Olympiad
- Venue: West Melbourne Stadium
- Dates: 26 November – 1 December 1956
- Competitors: 14 from 14 nations

Medalists
| 1st place, gold medalist(s) | | Gennadi Schatkov | Soviet Union |
| 2nd place, silver medalist(s) | | Ramón Tapia | Chile |
| 3rd place, bronze medalist(s) | | Gilbert Chapron | France |
| 3rd place, bronze medalist(s) | | Victor Zalazar | Argentina |

The men's middleweight event was part of the boxing programme at the 1956 Summer Olympics. The weight class was allowed boxers of up to 75 kilograms to compete. The competition was held from 26 November to 1 December 1956. 14 boxers from 14 nations competed.

== Medalists ==
| Gold | Gennadi Schatkov; Soviet Union |
| Silver | Ramón Tapia; Chile |
| Bronze | Gilbert Chapron; France |
| Bronze | Victor Zalazar; Argentina |

== Results ==
=== First round ===
- Giulio Rinaldi (ITA) def. Jens Andersen (DEN), PTS
- Gennadi Shatkov (URS) def. Ralph Hosack (CAN), PTS
- Dieter Wemhöner (FRG) def. Ronald Redrup (GBR), PTS
- Victor Zalazar (ARG) def. Stig Sjölin (SWE), PTS
- Július Torma (CZE) def. Howard Richter (AUS), PTS
- Ramón Tapia (CHI) def. Zbigniew Piórkowski (POL), RSC-1

=== Quarterfinals ===
- Gilbert Chapron (FRA) def. Roger Rouse (USA), PTS
- Gennadi Shatkov (URS) def. Giulio Rinaldi (ITA), walk-over
- Victor Zalazar (ARG) def. Dieter Wemhöner (FRG), PTS
- Ramón Tapia (CHI) def. Július Torma (CZE), RSC-2

=== Semifinals ===
- Gennadi Shatkov (URS) def. Victor Zalazar (ARG), RTD-2
- Ramón Tapia (CHI) def. Gilbert Chapron (FRA), walk-over

=== Final ===
- Gennadi Shatkov (URS) def. Ramón Tapia (CHI), KO-1
