= Gustav Scholz =

German boxer (1930–2000)

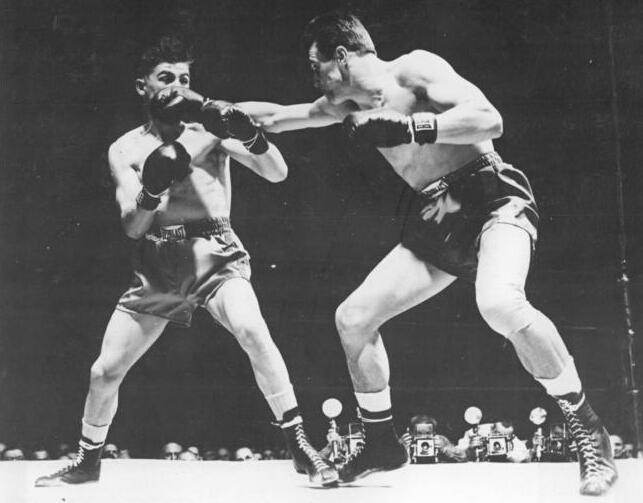
- Scholz (right) defeated American Al Andrews on 31 March 1954

Personal information
- Nickname: Bubi Scholz
- Nationality: German
- Born: Gustav Wilhelm Hermann Scholz; 12 April 1930 Berlin, Germany
- Died: 21 August 2000 (aged 70) Berlin, Germany

Boxing career
- Stance: Southpaw

Boxing record
- Total fights: 96
- Wins: 88
- Win by KO: 46
- Losses: 2
- Draws: 6

Gustav Wilhelm Hermann "Bubi" Scholz (12 April 1930 – 21 August 2000) was a German boxer. He was popularly called Bubi. In the 1950s and early 1960s he won the German National Boxing Championship and European Boxing Championship several times. After his retirement in 1964, he acted in six films and several TV series. Scholz married twice, and was imprisoned for three years on charges of murdering his first wife. He developed dementia and was diagnosed with Alzheimer's disease in his later life. He attempted suicide twice and died at the age of 70 due to cardiac arrest.

== Early life ==
Gustav Wilhelm Hermann Scholz was born to a blacksmith and a housewife in Berlin. In 1944 he began an apprenticeship as a mechanic, and after the end of the Second World War he was trained as chef.

== Career ==
In 1947, Scholz attended a boxing school in Berlin. On 8 October 1948, he was a last-minute replacement for a professional match against Werner Eichler, though he had not previously competed as an amateur, and he won the fight. Eicher was injured so badly that he had to postpone his wedding which was scheduled to be held the next day. Scholz logged his first defeat on 10 March 1958 against Charles Humez.

On 19 May 1951, Scholz won a points victory against defending champion Walter Schneider and became the German champion in the welterweight category for the first time. He defended his title successfully against Charles Oechsle and Leo Starosch in 1952. At the end of 1952, Scholz put his championship title in the welterweight division and stepped down from the middleweight category. In 1954 he appeared in Madison Square Garden in his first U.S. match, defeating American boxer Al Andrews. In 1955 he was diagnosed with tuberculosis, which forced him to take a one and a half year sabbatical.

After recovering from his illness, he won a knockout match against defending champion Peter Müller in a 29 June 1957 German middleweight championship. He defended the title with another knockout victory in May 1958 against Max Resch. On 4 October 1958, he defeated Charles Humez in Berlin's Olympiastadion by technical knockout in the 12th round, and thus won the European Championship in the middleweight division. Humez announced his retirement on 18 January 1989. Scholz successfully defended both titles against Hans Werner Wohlers (by point victory in July 1959) and against Peter Müller (by technical knockout in the first round in November 1959). He successfully defended his European title against Andre Drille in December 1959. In the same year, he published the book Ring Free with memories of the beginnings of his career.

In 1961 Scholz put down his two middleweight title and moved to the light heavyweight division. In this class, he lost a fight against Harold Johnson for the championship on 23 June 1962, but on 4 April 1964, he won the European light heavyweight championship against defending champion Giulio Rinaldi. After that, Scholz finished his boxing career.

Between 1948 and 1964 Scholz had a total of 96 fights, of which he won 88, including 46 by knockout; only two times he lost, both on points. His success as a boxer earned him great popularity in Germany, especially in the 1950s and 1960s when he was compared to Max Schmeling, the most prominent boxing star of Germany.

His success in boxing brought him a short-lived career in the entertainment industry. He appeared in 1960 as Boxer Breitenbach in the television production The Champion Boxer. That same year, he played the role of Ralf Moebius in Paul Martin's musical comedy Marina. In the Music Film Hit Parade 1961 by Franz Marischka, he was known as Ralf Hegener. In 1959 and 1962 he collaborated with the Werner Müller orchestra and the vocal group The 3 Travellers at Telefunken and Metronomes, and released three music singles.

== 1965–1984 ==
Following his career as a professional boxer, Scholz opened the advertising agency Zühlke and Scholz in Berlin, trying to build on his popularity as an athlete. In 1971, he was seen in a supporting role as a police officer in Thomas Engel's teleplay Lucky. In 1977, he made a guest appearance as a boxing coach in the 20th episode of the TV comedy series Odds and Ends. In 1980, he published his autobiography, The Way Out of Nowhere, but received negative publicity in those years due to his drinking habits.

== 1984–2000 ==
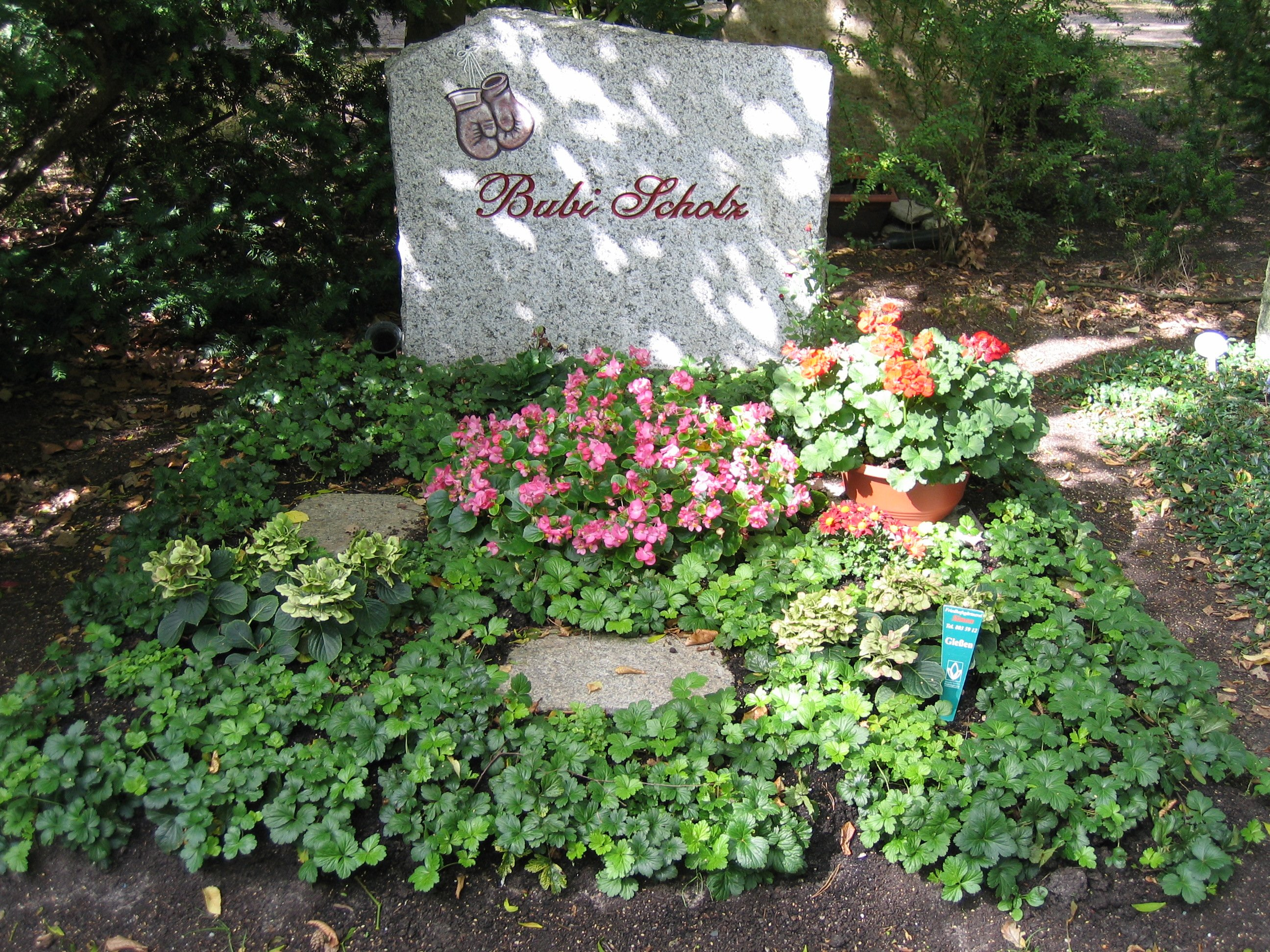
Scholz's original grave in the Woodland Cemetery, Zehlendorf.

On the evening of 22 July 1984, Scholz shot his 49-year-old wife Helga, whom he had married in 1955, in their Berlin villa. He was arrested the following day. Helga was buried two weeks later in the presence of approximately 1,000 people. Scholz claimed the shooting was an accident and that the "shot had been loosened during the cleaning of the gun". On 1 February 1985, the court sentenced him to custodial arrest for three years on the charge of manslaughter and violation of the Arms Act of Germany. The case was the subject of an episode of the documentary series "The Major Criminal Cases" in 2012. Scholz was released in August 1987.

In October 1993, Scholz married Sabine Arndt. During 1997–98, he suffered several strokes, and developed dementia. He tried to commit suicide twice. He had also been diagnosed with Alzheimer's disease. He died of cardiac arrest on 21 August 2000 at a nursing home in Hoppegarten. He was buried in the Woodland Cemetery in Zehlendorf, Berlin. His widow Sabine married actor Klaus Jürgen Wussow in 2004. In August 2008, at the request of Sabine, Scholz's body was reburied at the Berlin Heerstraße Cemetery.

== The Bubi Scholz Story ==
In 1997–98, director Roland Suso Richter filmed The Bubi Scholz Story for television from a screenplay by Uwe Timm, with Benno Fürmann in the role of young Scholz and Götz George playing the adult Scholz. Scholz himself could not attend the premiere of the film in May 1998 due to his poor health. This was Fürmann's breakthrough starring and he received the German TV Award as Best Actor in a telefilm, for the role of Scholz.

== Autobiography ==
- Ring Free. Recorded by Harvey T. Rowe. Copress-Verlag, Munich 1959.
- The Road Out of Nowhere. Krüger, Frankfurt am Main 1980, ISBN 3-8105-1802-6. (New edition: The Way Out of Nowhere: The Autobiography. Fischer Taschenbuch Verlag, Frankfurt am Main 1998, ISBN 3-596-14291-1)

== Filmography ==
- 1960: The Champion Boxer (TV)
- 1960: Marina
- 1961: Hit Parade 1961
- 1971: Lucky (TV)
- 1989: Chicago 6 x 6
- 1993: Murder of Love (documentary)

== Discography ==
=== Singles ===
- 1959: It has only Blue Jeans / The strong Joe from Mexico ( Telefunken U 55176)
- 1959: Susie, you're just fine / counting ' the Girls (Telefunken U 55194)
- 1962 : The Rita the sports club / You're my lucky charm (Metronome M 309)
- 1962 : Boys, that was a night! / Mister O.K. (First published 1998)

=== CD Sampler ===
- 2000: It has only blue jeans (Bear Family Records BCD 16278 )

Achievements
Preceded by Giulio Rinaldi	European Light Heavyweight Champion; 4 April 1964 – 7 July 1965	Succeeded by Giulio Rinaldi
Preceded by Charles Humez	European Middleweight Champion; 4 October 1958 – 17 October 1961	Succeeded by John McCormack
