= Víctor Zalazar =

Argentine boxer

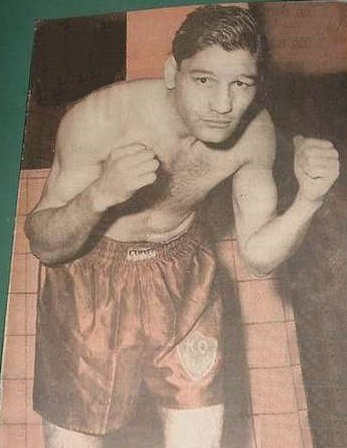

Medal record

Representing Argentina

Men's Boxing

Olympic Games
Bronze medal – third place	1956 Melbourne	Bantamweight

Victor Zalazar (14 June 1933 – 30 June 2017) was an Argentine boxer, who won the bronze medal at the 1956 Summer Olympics in Melbourne, Australia. He was born in La Paz, Córdoba. Zalazar was known as "El Cacique", or "The Wild Bullet".

== Olympic results ==
- Defeated Stig Sjölin (Sweden) points
- Defeated Dieter Wemhöner (United Team of Germany) points
- Lost to Gennadi Schatkov (Soviet Union) KO by 2

== Professional career ==
Zalazar turned pro in 1957 and won his first 15 fights before taking on Benny Paret in 1958. He lost two straight decisions to Paret, and his career went downhill following the losses. He also lost, on points, to Dick Tiger.
