= Ray Cillien =

Luxembourgish boxer

Ray Cillien (June 26, 1939 – September 22, 1991) was a boxer from Luxembourg. He was born in Esch-sur-Alzette. Cillien was member of the Luxembourgish Olympic team at the 1960 Summer Olympics in Rome. After a bye in the first round of the light-heavyweight division, he was eliminated in the second round by Soviet Gennadiy Shatkov.

== 1960 Olympic record ==
Below are the results of Ray Cillien, a light heavyweight boxer who competed for Luxembourg at the 1960 Rome Olympics:

- Round of 32: bye
- Round of 16: lost to Gennadiy Shatkov (Soviet Union) by decision, 0-5.

== Professional boxing record ==
7 Wins (1 knockout, 6 decisions), 13 Losses (8 knockouts, 5 decisions)
| Result | Record | Opponent | Type | Round | Date | Location | Notes |
| Loss | 19-0-1 | (Italy) Vittorio Saraudi | TKO | 4 | 13/08/1966 | (Italy) Rimini, Emilia-Romagna | |
| Loss | 5-1 | (Norway) Bjarne Lingaas | PTS | 6 | 10/12/1965 | (Sweden) Masshallen, Gothenburg | |
| Loss | 45-25-6 | (Netherlands) Wim Snoek | TKO | 2 | 04/10/1965 | Luxembourg City | |
| Win | 7-11-2 | (Belgium) Valere Mahau | PTS | 8 | 28/06/1965 | Luxembourg City | |
| Win | -- | (Belgium) Robert Jacobs | KO | 7 | 03/05/1965 | (Luxembourg) Esch-sur-Alzette | |
| Win | 7-2 | (Germany) Karl Hermann Troche | PTS | 8 | 15/03/1965 | (Luxembourg) Esch-sur-Alzette | |
| Loss | 39-12-2 | (United States) Buddy Turman | KO | 2 | 13/02/1965 | (Germany) Ernst Merck Halle, Hamburg | |
| Loss | 6-1-1 | (France) Henri Corack | RTD | 5 | 21/11/1964 | (France) Lannion, Cotes-D'armor | |
| Win | 0-5-3 | (Martinique) Henri Ferjules | PTS | 8 | 02/10/1964 | (Luxembourg) Esch-sur-Alzette | |
| Loss | 19-3-3 | (Sweden) Lennart Risberg | PTS | 8 | 09/05/1964 | (Sweden) Royal Tennis Hall, Stockholm | |
| Loss | 24-11-3 | (Finland) Pekka Kokkonen | KO | 2 | 09/12/1963 | (Finland) Helsinki | |
| Loss | 7-3-3 | (Netherlands) Bas van Duivenbode | PTS | 8 | 04/11/1963 | (Netherlands) Riviera-hal, Rotterdam | |
| Loss | 43-20-6 | (Netherlands) Wim Snoek | PTS | 10 | 16/09/1963 | (Netherlands) Riviera-hal, Rotterdam | |
| Loss | 41-6-1 | (Wales) Joe Erskine | TKO | 4 | 29/07/1963 | (Wales) Cardiff Drill Hall, Cardiff | |
| Loss | 10-0-1 | (Italy) Giuseppe Migliari | KO | 4 | 22/02/1963 | (Italy) Milan, Lombardy | |
| Loss | 25-7-4 | (Ivory Coast) Yao Kouame | PTS | 10 | 09/12/1962 | (Ivory Coast) Abidjan | |
| Win | 6-8-3 | (Germany) Albert Duscha | PTS | 8 | 30/09/1962 | Luxembourg City | |
| Loss | 16-17-4 | (Spain) Mariano Echevarria | KO | 5 | 13/07/1962 | (Spain) Madrid | |
| Win | 7-34-4 | (Germany) Guenter Huber | PTS | 6 | 28/01/1962 | (Luxembourg) Limpertsberg | |
| Win | 2-1-1 | (Socialist Federal Republic of Yugoslavia) Ivan Prebeg | PTS | 8 | 06/12/1961 | (Luxembourg) Bonnevoie | |
