= Ramón Tapia (boxer) =

Chilean boxer (1932–1984)

Medal record

Men's Boxing

Representing Chile

Olympic Games
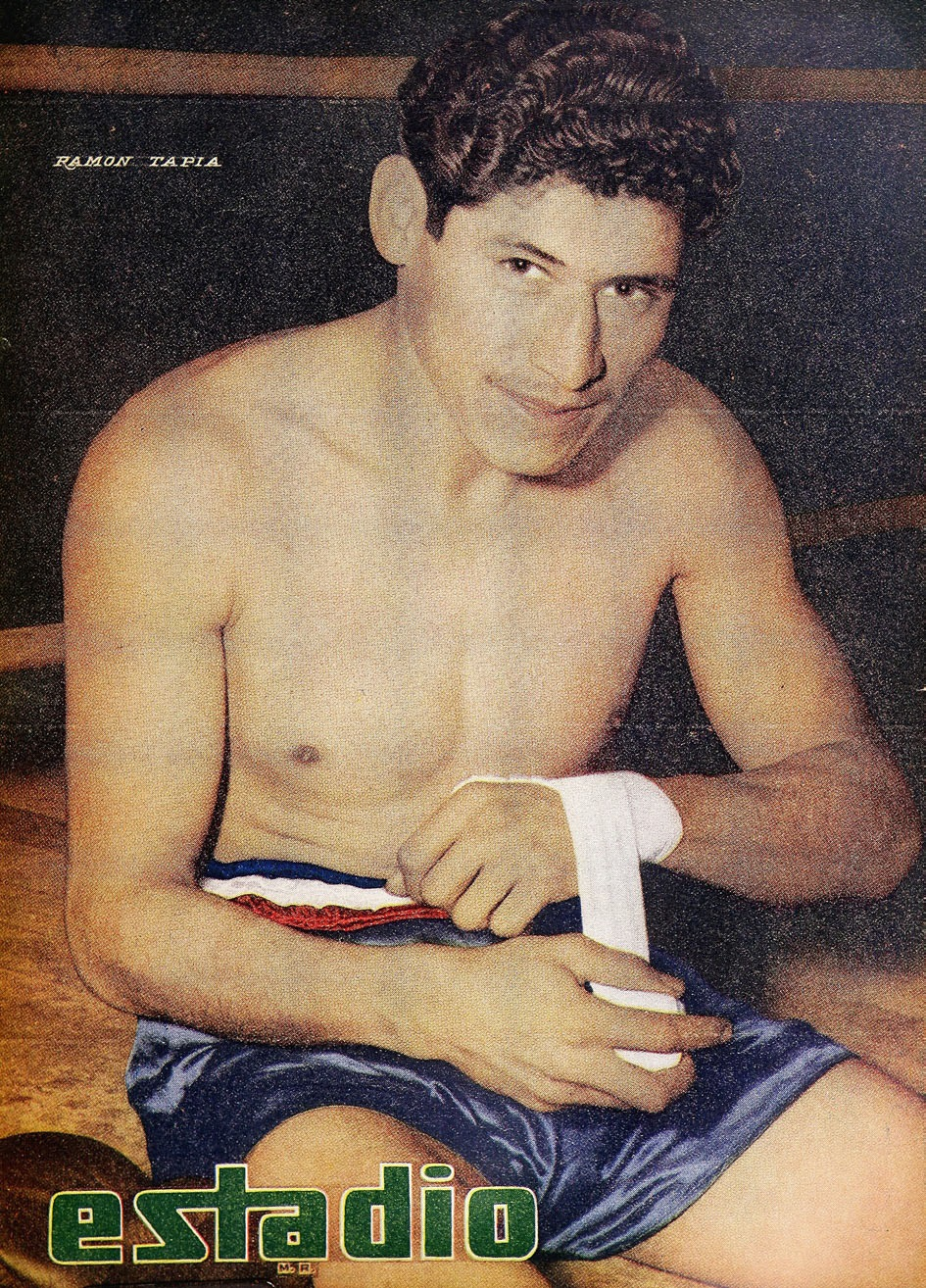
Silver medal – second place	1956 Melbourne	Middleweight Ramón Tapia, 1956.

Ramón Tapia Zapata (March 17, 1932 in Antofagasta – April 12, 1984) was a Chilean boxer who won the silver medal in the middleweight division at the 1956 Summer Olympics in Melbourne, Australia. Tapia died in 1984.

== Olympic results ==
- Defeated Zbigniew Piórkowski (Poland) K.O.
- Defeated Július Torma (Czechoslovakia) K.O.
- Defeated Gilbert Chapron (France) points
- Lost to Gennadi Shatkov (Soviet Union) K.O.
