= Piorkowski =

Piorkowski (Polish: Piórkowski; feminine: Piórkowska; plural: Piórkowscy) is a Polish surname. Notable people with the surname include:

- Alexander Piorkowski (1904–1948), German Nazi SS concentration camp commandant executed for war crimes
- Daniel Piorkowski (born 1984), Australian footballer
- Zbigniew Piórkowski (1929–1994), Polish boxer
