= Giulio Rinaldi =

Italian boxer

Liu Giulio Rinaldi
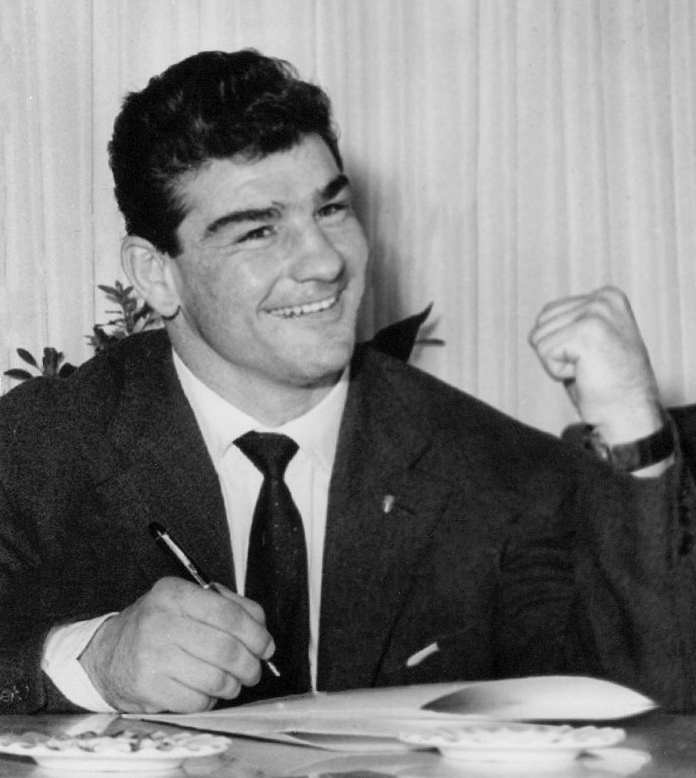
- Rinaldi in 1961

Personal information
- Nationality: Italian
- Born: 13 February 1935 Anzio, Italy
- Died: 16 July 2011 (aged 76) Anzio, Italy
- Weight: Middleweight

Boxing career

Giulio Rinaldi (13 February 1935 – 16 July 2011) was an Italian boxer. He competed at the 1956 Summer Olympics where he was eliminated in the first bout.

== Pro career ==
During his thirteen and-a-half-year professional career from 1957 to 1970, Rinaldi compiled a record of 44–16–5, with 13 knockouts. He won the Italian light heavyweight title in 1960, and defeated Archie Moore in a non-title bout the same year. In June 1961, Rinaldi lost a 15-round decision in a rematch with Moore for the NYSAC World Light Heavyweight title. He then went undefeated in ten consecutive fights, and went on to decision 34–0–4 Erich Schoppner over 15 rounds to win the European Light Heavyweight title in 1963. He lost the EBU title by ninth round disqualification to Gustav Sholtz in 1964. He regained the vacant European Light Heavyweight title with a thirteenth round stoppage of Klaus Gumpert in 1965, before losing it by 15-round decision to Piero La Papa in 1966.

Moving up to heavyweight, Rinaldi won only one of his next ten bouts, drawing and losing to future European Heavyweight champion Juergen Blin. In 1970, Rinaldi returned to light heavyweight, regaining the Italian Light Heavyweight title for the first time in ten years by an eight-round disqualification over Gianfranco Maccia. Rinaldi's career ended later in 1970 when he lost the Italian Light Heavyweight title with a 12-round decision loss to unbeaten Domenico Adinolfi, who went on to win the European Light Heavyweight title. He died on 16 July 2011, in his residence in Anzio, Italy.

== Professional boxing record ==
44 Wins (13 knockouts, 28 decisions, 3 DQs), 16 Losses (4 knockouts, 8 decisions, 4 DQs), 5 Draws, 2 No Contests Archived 2014-04-08 at the Wayback Machine
Result	Record	Opponent	Type	Round	Date	Location	Notes
Loss	8–0	(Italy) Domenico Adinolfi	KO	5	23 October 1970	(Italy) Rome, Lazio	Italy Light Heavyweight Title.
Win	19–2–4	(Italy) Gianfranco Macchia	DQ	8	22 August 1970	(Italy) Anzio, Lazio	Italy Light Heavyweight Title.
Win	5–5	(South Africa) Kosie Smith	PTS	10	23 May 1970	(South Africa) Ellis Park Stadium, Johannesburg, Gauteng	
Win	3–5	(Italy) Vasco Faustino	PTS	8	18 April 1970	(Italy) Anzio, Lazio	
Loss	23–8–3	(Germany) Horst Benedens	PTS	8	24 January 1970	(Germany) Sportpalast, Schoeneberg, Berlin	
Loss	15–7–6	(Germany) Juergen Blin	PTS	10	29 May 1969	(Germany) Grugahalle, Essen, North Rhine-Westphalia	
Loss	29–7–6	(Germany) Wilhelm Von Homburg	TKO	7	2 April 1969	(Germany) Sportpalast, Schoeneberg, Berlin	
Win	29–6–6	(Germany) Wilhelm Von Homburg	PTS	10	14 February 1969	(Germany) Ernst Merck Halle, Hamburg	
Loss	28–6–6	(Germany) Wilhelm Von Homburg	TKO	5	3 January 1969	(Germany) Sportpalast, Schoeneberg, Berlin	
Loss	31–5	(Australia) Bob Dunlop	PTS	10	18 November 1968	(Australia) Sydney Stadium, Sydney	
Draw	12–12–3	(Saint Christopher-Nevis-Anguilla) Johnny Hendrickson	PTS	8	3 May 1968	(Italy) Palazzetto dello Sport, Rome, Lazio	
Loss	19–5–2	(United Kingdom) Billy Walker	DQ	1	13 February 1967	(United Kingdom) Belle Vue Zoological Gardens, Belle Vue, Manchester	Rinaldi disqualified at 2:45 of the first round for butting.
No Contest	7–0–2	(Italy) Giulio Saraudi	NC	5	2 December 1966	(Italy) Palazzetto dello Sport, Rome, Lazio	
Draw	10–3–1	(Germany) Juergen Blin	PTS	10	2 September 1966	(Germany) Mungersdorfer Stadion, Cologne, North Rhine-Westphalia	
Loss	28–2–3	(Italy) Piero Del Papa	PTS	15	11 March 1966	(Italy) Rome, Lazio	EBU Light Heavyweight Title.
Win	24–1–4	(Germany) Klaus Peter Gumpert	RTD	13	8 July 1965	(Italy) Hilton Hotel, Rome, Lazio	EBU Light Heavyweight Title.
Win	15–6–2	(Argentina) Jose Menno	PTS	10	7 May 1965	(Italy) Rome, Lazio	
No Contest	14–6–2	(Argentina) Jose Menno	NC	4	19 February 1965	(Italy) Rome, Lazio	
Win	7–7	(United States) Don Turner	KO	8	22 January 1965	(Italy) Palazzetto dello Sport, Rome, Lazio	Turner knocked out at 2:50 of the eighth round.
Draw	16–10–1	(United States) Herschel Jacobs	PTS	10	18 September 1964	(Italy) Palazzetto dello Sport, Rome, Lazio	
Win	15–10–3	(United States) Johnny Alford	PTS	10	29 July 1964	(Italy) Rome, Lazio	
Win	16–16–2	(United States) Floyd McCoy	PTS	10	10 April 1964	(Italy) Palazzetto dello Sport, Rome, Lazio	
Loss	87–2–6	(Germany) Gustav Scholz	DQ	9	4 April 1964	(Germany) Westfalenhallen, Dortmund, North Rhine-Westphalia	EBU Light Heavyweight Title.
Loss	45–6–5	(Germany) Hans Werner Wohlers	DQ	2	28 February 1964	(Italy) Palazzetto dello Sport, Rome, Lazio	
Win	22–14–1	(United States) Bob Young	KO	9	3 February 1964	(Italy) Bologna, Emilia-Romagna	
Win	34–0–4	(Germany) Erich Schoppner	PTS	15	23 May 1963	(Italy) Stadio Flaminio, Rome, Lazio	EBU Light Heavyweight Title.
Draw	26–17–2	(United States) Wayne Bethea	PTS	10	5 April 1963	(Italy) Palazzetto dello Sport, Rome, Lazio	
Draw	88–13	(United States) Bobo Olson	PTS	10	14 December 1962	(Italy) Palazzetto dello Sport, Rome, Lazio	
Win	32–2–1	(Scotland) Chic Calderwood	PTS	15	28 September 1962	(Italy) Palazzetto dello Sport, Rome, Lazio	EBU Light Heavyweight Title.
Win	16–9–1	(Cuba) Lino Rendon	DQ	6	22 June 1962	(Italy) Palazzetto dello Sport, Rome, Lazio	
Win	25–5–2	(United States) Billy Ryan	PTS	10	30 March 1962	(Italy) Rome, Lazio	
Win	3–1	(Brazil) Renato Moraes	PTS	10	19 January 1962	(Italy) Palazzetto dello Sport, Rome, Lazio	
Win	20–6–3	(Germany) Helmut Ball	TKO	7	20 December 1961	(Italy) Palazzetto dello Sport, Rome, Lazio	
Win	35–3–3	(Germany) Dieter Wemhoner	PTS	10	24 November 1961	(Italy) Palazzetto dello Sport, Rome, Lazio	
Win	14–5–3	(Germany) Rudolf Nehring	KO	4	27 October 1961	(Italy) Palazzetto dello Sport, Rome, Lazio	
Win	34–8–1	(United States) Roque Maravilla	PTS	10	20 September 1961	(Italy) Rome, Lazio	
Loss	180–22–9	(United States) Archie Moore	UD	15	10 June 1961	(United States) Madison Square Garden, New York City	NYSAC World Light Heavyweight Title. 3–11, 4–11, 5–9.
Win	25–5–2	(Puerto Rico) "Kid" Sixto Rodriguez	PTS	10	24 March 1961	(Italy) Rome, Lazio	
Win	16–10	(United States) Freddie Mack	PTS	10	24 February 1961	(Italy) Rome, Lazio	
Win	20–12–7	(United States) Sonny Ray	PTS	10	13 January 1961	(Italy) Rome, Lazio	
Win	178–21–9	(United States) Archie Moore	PTS	10	29 October 1960	(Italy) Palazzetto dello Sport, Rome, Lazio	
Win	24–4–3	(Tonga) Johnny Halafihi	PTS	10	1 October 1960	(Italy) Palazzetto dello Sport, Rome, Lazio	
Win	34–7–1	(United States) Donnie Fleeman	PTS	10	9 July 1960	(Italy) Rome, Lazio	
Win	49–13–8	(France) Germinal Ballarin	PTS	12	4 June 1960	(Italy) Rome, Lazio	EBU Light Heavyweight Title Eliminator.
Win	49–5–1	(Netherlands) Leen Jansen	PTS	10	27 April 1960	(Italy) Palazzetto dello Sport, Rome, Lazio	
Win	32–1–1	(United States) Santo Amonti	TKO	2	8 March 1960	(Italy) Palazzetto dello Sport, Rome, Lazio	Italy Light Heavyweight Title.
Loss	25–2–1	(Germany) Dieter Wemhoner	PTS	8	21 November 1959	(Italy) Palasport di San Siro, Milan, Lombardy	
Win	32–7–5	(Germany) Horst Niche	PTS	10	16 October 1959	(Italy) Rome, Lazio	
Win	22–5–2	(Italy) Rocco Mazzola	PTS	10	2 October 1959	(Italy) Rome, Lazio	
Win	6–5–1	(Spain) Jose Mariano Moracia Ibanes	PTS	10	15 August 1959	(Italy) Sanremo, Liguria	
Loss	21–4–2	(Italy) Rocco Mazzola	TKO	1	13 July 1959	(Italy) Rome, Lazio	
Loss	22–1–1	(Tonga) Johnny Halafihi	PTS	10	13 April 1959	(United Kingdom) Nottingham Ice Stadium, Nottingham, Nottinghamshire	
Win	14–5–2	(Nigeria) Sammy Langford	TKO	5	12 March 1959	(Italy) Rome, Lazio	
Win	31–10–5	(Italy) Artenio Calzavara	PTS	10	8 January 1959	(Italy) Rome, Lazio	
Win	5–1–2	(Germany) Hans Ducree	TKO	7	27 November 1958	(Italy) Rome, Lazio	
Loss	19–9–2	(Algeria) Ahmed Boulgroune	DQ	4	6 October 1958	(Italy) Palazzetto dello Sport, Rome, Lazio	
Win	36–17–5	(France) Tino Albanese	KO	1	12 July 1958	(Italy) Anzio, Lazio	
Win	22–6–4	(Germany) Uwe Janssen	PTS	8	27 May 1958	(Italy) Palazzetto dello Sport, Rome, Lazio	
Win	8–2	(France) Jacques Dufreney	DQ	6	13 April 1958	(Italy) Anzio, Lazio	
Win	--	Otello Meneghini	KO	2	7 March 1958	(Italy) La Spezia, Liguria	
Win	1–2	(Italy) Giovanni Moriggi	PTS	6	14 January 1958	(Italy) Rome, Lazio	
Win	2–5–1	(Italy) Loreto Vari	PTS	6	18 December 1957	(Italy) Rome, Lazio	
Win	1–2	(Italy) Aldo Brunetti	TKO	5	19 October 1957	(Italy) Rome, Lazio	
Loss	9–3–2	(Italy) Domenico Baccheschi	PTS	6	31 July 1957	(Italy) Rome, Lazio	
Win	26–20–6	(Italy) Widmer Milandri	TKO	4	24 April 1957	(Italy) Rome, Lazio	
Win	3–5–2	(Italy) Angelo Greco	PTS	6	13 April 1957	(Italy) Rome, Lazio	
Win	1–3	(Italy) Giuliano Bianchi	TKO	5	23 March 1957	(Italy) Rome, Lazio	
