= PalaLottomatica =

Multi-purpose sports and entertainment arena in Rome, Italy

Palazzo dello Sport
- PalaSport, PalaEUR
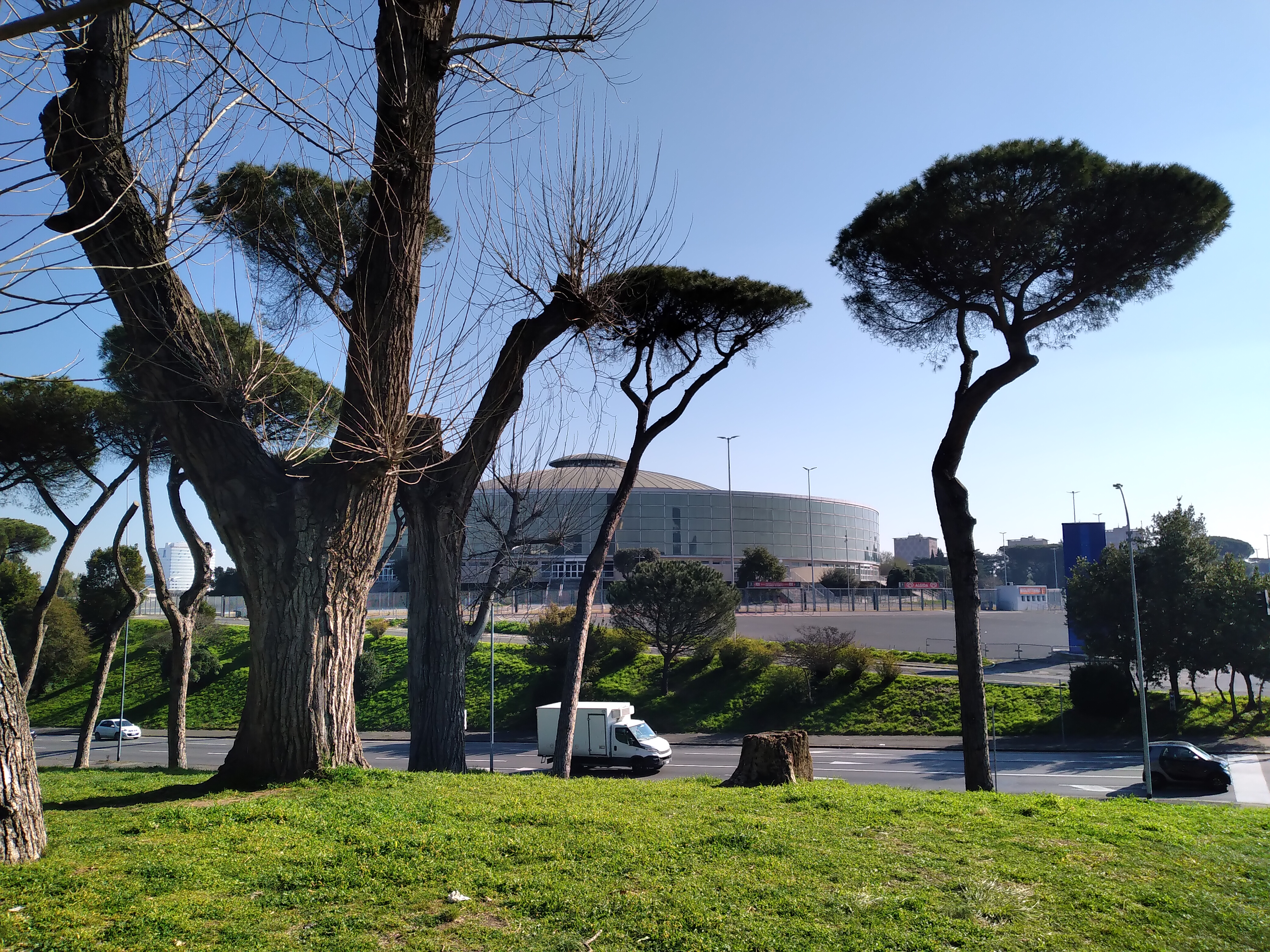
- Interactive map of Palazzo dello Sport
- Former names: Palazzo dello Sport (1960–2003, 2018–present) PalaLottomatica (2003–2018)
- Location: Piazzale dello Sport; I-00144 Rome
- Coordinates: 41°49′31.31″N 12°27′59.55″E
- Owner: Ente EUR Spa
- Operator: All Events Spa
- Capacity: Basketball: 11,200
- Surface: Parquet

Construction
- Groundbreaking: 1956
- Built: 1960
- Opened: 3 June 1960
- Renovated: 1999–2003
- Architect: Marcello Piacentini
- Structural engineer: Pier Luigi Nervi
- Services engineers: Ingg. Nervi & Bartoli

Tenants
- Virtus Roma (1983–1999, 2003–2011, 2018–2020); Maxima Roma (2026–present)

Website
- palazzodellosportroma.it

Palazzo dello Sport or PalaEUR, formerly known as PalaLottomatica, is a multi-purpose sports and entertainment arena in Rome, Italy. It is located in the heart of the well known modern EUR complex. The arena hosted the 1960 Olympic basketball tournament.

The venue features 8 meetings points, a restaurant for 300 people, and a 2,700 square metre (3,229 sq. yard) outdoor terrace. It has a seating capacity of 11,200 spectators for basketball games. The Palazzo dello Sport Rome, together with Unipol Forum of Milan, is a member of the European Arenas Association (EAA).

== History ==
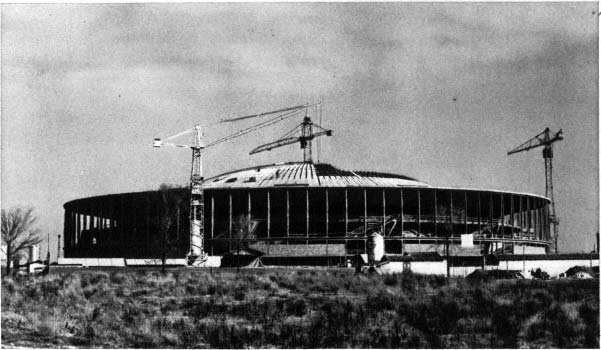
Palazzo dello Sport during its construction in February 1959

Palazzo dello Sport was designed by architect Marcello Piacentini, in 1957, and its reinforced concrete dome was engineered by Pier Luigi Nervi. It was constructed in two years, from 1958 to 1960, in time for the 1960 Summer Olympics. The facility was designed and built along with a smaller facility, the Palazzetto dello Sport, its dome also engineered by Nervi.

Formerly known as PalaSport, and informally known as PalaEUR, from the name of the arena's neighborhood, the "EUR", the arena was renamed to "PalaLottomatica", with the name of Lottomatica coming from the main sponsor that financed the arena's modernization work, from 1999 to 2003.

=== Modernization of the arena ===
The arena was renovated between 2000 and 2003. It was made more functional, especially in terms of acoustics, in order to be able to accommodate important musical events. Other changes were made to the original aesthetics of the stadium, particularly the night lighting of its exterior. That was done by adding glazing to the "tabellone della tombola", with numbers dramatically illuminated behind the glass.

The remodelled arena was able to seat up to 11,200 spectators. The structure was modified to accommodate multiple sporting events (including internal competitions of, for example, the pro basketball club Virtus Roma), concerts, conferences, and theatrical events.

== Events hosted ==
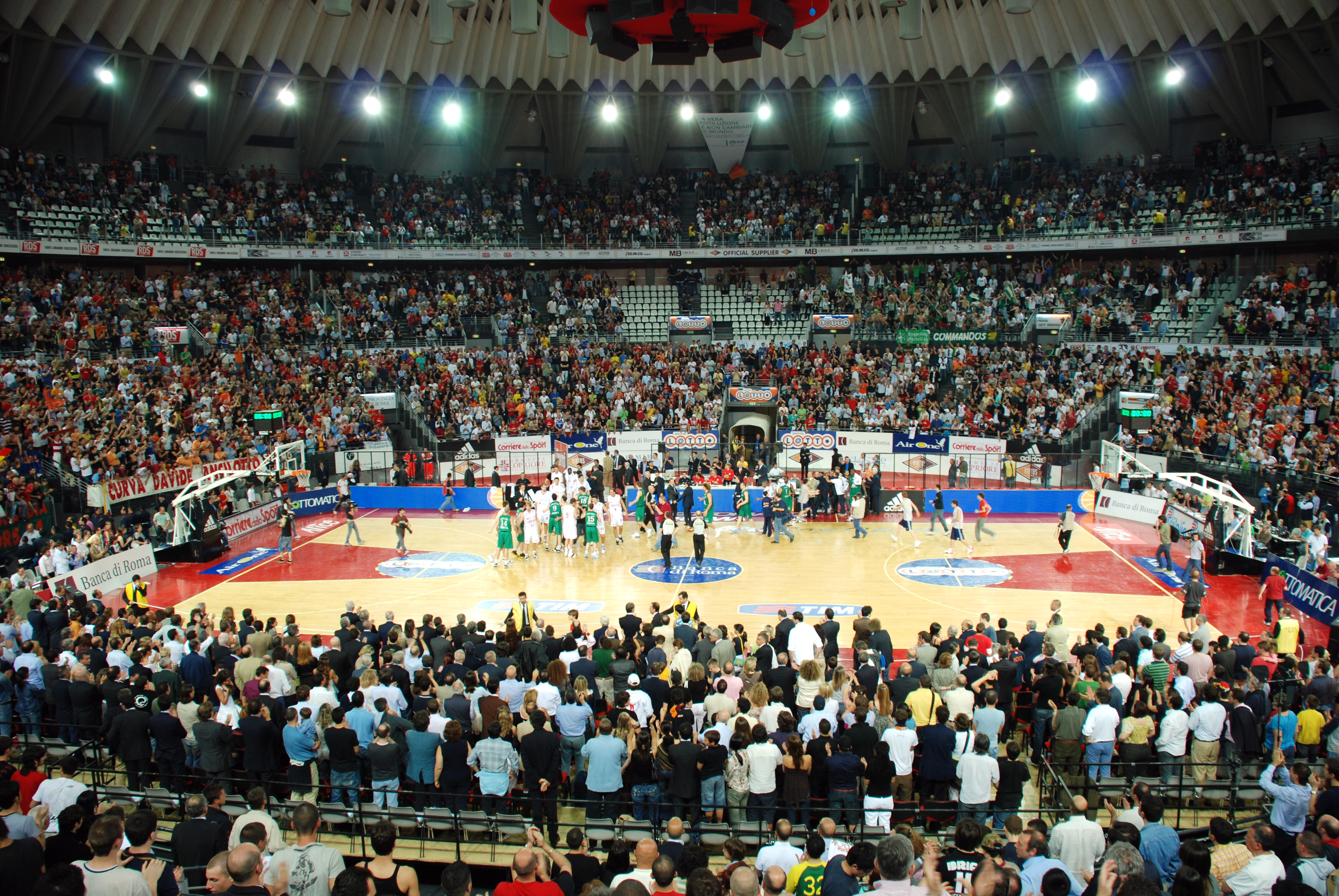
Interior of PalaLottomatica, during a Virtus Roma game, 2006

The arena hosted the 1960 Olympic basketball tournaments, the EuroBasket 1991 and the 1997 EuroLeague Final Four. It was the home arena of the Italian professional basketball team Lottomatica Roma.

In 1997, the PalaLottomatica hosted the EuroLeague Final Four (in the final, Olympiacos defeated Barcelona, by a score of 73–58), and the final stage of the 2005 Men's European Volleyball Championship, hosting the final between Italy and Russia. An audience of over 14,000 spectators was disappointed, due to a 3–2 comeback victory in Italy, after a thrilling game that lasted over two hours. The WWE held a show at the arena on 7 November 2008.

The PalaEUR was also a venue of the 1978 and 2010 FIVB Volleyball Men's World Championships, as well as the 2014 FIVB Volleyball Women's World Championship. The venue was also named the host of the 2016–17 CEV Champions League Final 4 of volleyball, on 29-30 April 2017, which followed the prior hosting rights to the 2011 event.

Many artists have performed at the Palazzo dello Sport / PalaLottomatica since the late 1960s and early 1970s: among them, the Rolling Stones in 1970, Depeche Mode several times since 1987, the Cure, Paul McCartney, Iron Maiden, Dire Straits Bon Jovi, and many others.

In 1975, a Lou Reed concert was cancelled because of turmoil between the police and groups of people who were protesting against the high prices of concert tickets; because of that turmoil, the Palazzo dello Sport was seriously damaged, and foreign artists refused to perform in Italy for the next five years, until Bob Marley performed in Milan in 1980. AC/DC performed a show at the arena in May 1996, during their Ballbreaker World Tour. This arena also hosted an Avril Lavigne concert, during her The Black Star Tour, on 10 September 2011. Lana Del Rey has performed twice at the arena, in 2013 during her Paradise Tour and in 2018 during her LA to the Moon Tour. Violetta cast performed at the arena 11 times, including six shows in 2014 as part of the Violetta en Vivo tour and five shows in 2015 as part of the Violetta Live International Tour. Ariana Grande performed at the arena in 2017 during her Dangerous Woman Tour. In February 2018, the Soy Luna cast performed 2 concerts at the arena during the Soy Luna Live tour.

The first artist to perform after the modernization of the arena and its renaming to PalaLottomatica was Santana, in 2003. On 9 December 1989, the final draw for the 1990 FIFA World Cup was held at the Palazzo.

== See also ==
- Norfolk Scope
- List of indoor arenas in Italy

Events and tenants
Preceded by Royal Exhibition Building; Melbourne	Summer Olympics Basketball; Final Venue; 1960	Succeeded by Yoyogi National Gymnasium; Tokyo
Preceded by Pabellón de la Ciudad Deportiva; Madrid	FIBA Intercontinental Cup; Final Venue; 1967	Succeeded by The Spectrum; Philadelphia
Preceded by Gimnasio Olímpico Juan de la Barrera; Mexico City	FIVB Volleyball Men's World Championship; Final Venue; 1978	Succeeded by Estadio Luna Park; Buenos Aires
Preceded by Dom Športova; Zagreb	FIBA EuroBasket; Final Venue; 1991	Succeeded by Olympiahalle; Munich
Preceded by Palais omnisports de Paris-Bercy; Paris	FIBA EuroLeague; Final Four; Venue; 1997	Succeeded by Palau Sant Jordi; Barcelona
Preceded by Palacio Vistalegre; Madrid	FIVB Volleyball World League; Final Venue; 2004	Succeeded by Belgrade Arena; Belgrade
Preceded by PAOK Sports Arena; Thessaloniki	CEV Volleyball Champions League; Final Venue; 2006	Succeeded by Khodynka Arena; Moscow
Preceded by Yoyogi National Gymnasium; Tokyo	FIVB Volleyball Men's World Championship; Final Venue; 2010	Succeeded by Spodek; Katowice
Preceded by Tauron Arena; Kraków	CEV Champions League; Final Venue; 2017	Succeeded by Basket-Hall; Kazan
