= Ernst-Merck-Halle =

Coordinates: 53.5603°N 9.9794°E

Ernst-Merck-Halle was a 5,600-capacity indoor arena located in Hamburg, Germany, that was opened in 1950 and demolished in 1986. It was named after German businessman and politician Ernst Merck. Artists that appeared at the hall include The Beatles, The Rolling Stones, Kiss, Iron Maiden, Queen, Pink Floyd, The Who, AC/DC, Santana, Sweet and Deep Purple. The building was demolished in June 1986.
