= Gilbert Chapron =

French boxer (1933–2016)

Olympic medal record

Men's Boxing
Bronze medal – third place	1956 Melbourne	Middleweight

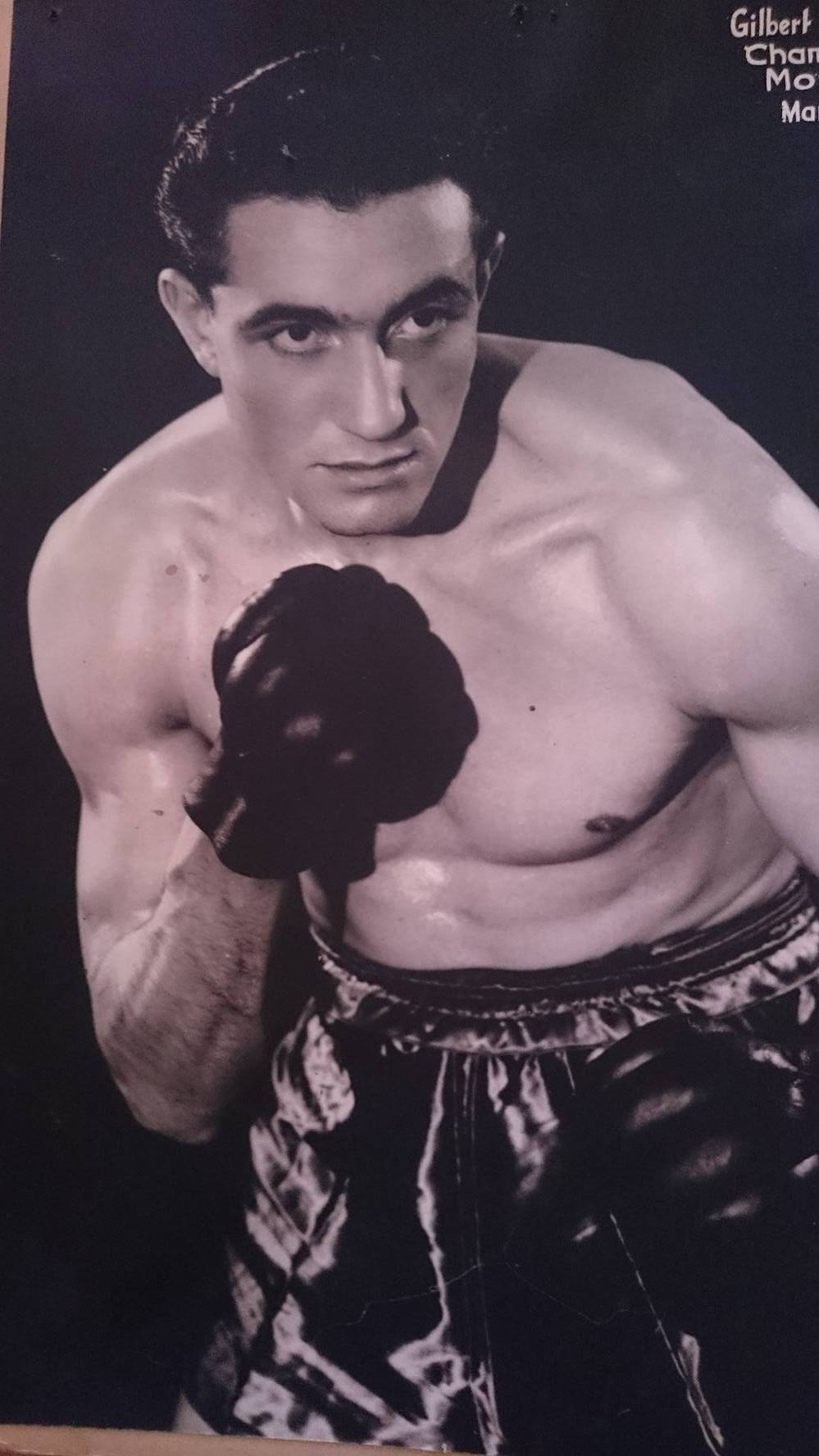
Gilbert Chapron

Gilbert Chapron (October 7, 1933 – September 5, 2016) was a French boxer, who competed in the middleweight division (– 75 kg) during his career as an amateur. He was born in Blois, Loir-et-Cher.

== Amateur career ==
Chapron represented France as a Middleweight (75 kg) at the 1956 Melbourne Olympic games, capturing a bronze medal.

== Olympic results ==
- 1st round bye
- Defeated Roger Rouse (United States) points
- Lost to Ramón Tapia (Chile) points
