= Facing Ali (book) =

Book by Stephen Brunt

- First edition
- Author: Stephen Brunt
- Language: English
- Genre: Non-fiction
- Publisher: Knopf Canada
- Publication date: 2002

Facing Ali is a 2002 book authored by Stephen Brunt; it is about fifteen different fighters from around the world who battled with Muhammad Ali in boxing fights. In each chapter of the book, one of the selected fighters recalls the experience of fighting with Ali. The profiled fighters include Ali's famous opponents like George Foreman, Joe Frazier, Larry Holmes, and Ken Norton; and also the relatively obscure like the German butcher Jurgen Blin who "was back at work at the sausage factory" after having fought with Ali the previous day. Other fighters profiled in the book include Tunney Hunsaker, Jean Pierre Coopman, Henry Cooper, Ron Lyle, Chuck Wepner, and George Chuvalo.

According to the Houston Chronicle:

The results of the experiment -- Ali as connective tissue that binds a colorful set of profiles -- are unique because Brunt's sources viewed Ali in a setting that yields its own peculiar kinds of insight, both about Ali and about the other fighters.
