= Moysés Blás =

Brazilian basketball player (1937–2026)

Medal record

Men's basketball

Representing Brazil

Olympic Games
Bronze medal – third place	1960 Rome	Team

Moysés Blás (alternate spelling: Moses Blass) (March 24, 1937 – November 6, 2026) was a Brazilian basketball player. Blass was Jewish and was born in Minas Gerais, Brazil. He was 5' 11". He played basketball for Brazil in the 1960 Olympics in Rome, and won a bronze medal, as Brazil finished behind the United States and the Soviet Union.

Blás died on November 6, 2026, at the age of 89.

== See also ==
- List of select Jewish basketball players
