= Basketball at the 1960 Summer Olympics =

5th Olympic Basketball Tournament
- Rome 1960

Tournament details
- Olympics: 1960 Summer Olympics
- Host nation: Italy
- City: Rome
- Duration: 26 August – 10 September 1960

Men's tournament
- Teams: 16
Medals
Gold medalists	United States
Silver medalists	Soviet Union
Bronze medalists	Brazil

Tournaments
← Melbourne 1956	Tokyo 1964 →

Basketball at the 1960 Summer Olympics was the fifth appearance of the sport of basketball as an official Olympic medal event. 16 nations were admitted into the Olympic tournament, with many others being eliminated in a pre-Olympic tournament held earlier in the year from 13 to 20 August 1960 at the Land Rover Arena at Bologna. 64 games of basketball were played in the Olympic tournament that was held at the Palazzetto dello Sport and PalaLottomatica, both in Rome.

The 16 teams were split up into four groups for the preliminary round. Each team played every other team in its group once. The top two teams in each group advanced to the semifinals in two pools of four, while the lower two teams were sent to a consolation semifinal for 9th through 16th place.

In the semifinal, each team again played every other team in its pool, none of which it had played against previously. The top two teams in each of the two semifinals moved on to the final, with the lower two teams in each playing in a classification for 5th through 8th place. The consolation semifinal worked the same way, with the top two teams moving into a classification for 9th through 12th place and the lower two playing in classification for 13th through 16th places.

For the final, each of the four teams had already played against one of the other three in the semifinal. The results of those games carried over into the final and each team played the remaining two finalists once (even though the teams may have played each other in the preliminary round, those results were not carried over). The results of that pool determined final ranking. Each of the classifications worked identically to the final.

== Medalists ==
Gold:	Silver:	Bronze:
United States; Jay Arnette; Walt Bellamy; Bob Boozer; Terry Dischinger; Burdette Haldorson; Darrall Imhoff; Allen Kelley; Lester Lane; Jerry Lucas; Oscar Robertson; Adrian Smith; Jerry West	Soviet Union; Yuri Korneev; Jānis Krūmiņš; Guram Minashvili; Valdis Muižnieks; Cēzars Ozers; Aleksandr Petrov; Mikhail Semyonov; Vladimir Ugrekhelidze; Maigonis Valdmanis; Albert Valtin; Gennadi Volnov; Viktor Zubkov	Brazil; Edson Bispo dos Santos; Moysés Blás; Waldemar Blatskauskas; Algodão; Rosa Branca; Carlos Domingos Massoni; Waldyr Boccardo; Wlamir Marques; Amaury Pasos; Fernando Pereira de Freitas; Antônio Salvador Sucar; Jatyr Eduardo Schall

== Pre-Olympic Qualifier ==
Five teams were given a spot in the 1960 Olympic Games via a tournament held in August:

- Czechoslovakia
- Spain
- Hungary
- Yugoslavia
- Poland

== Participating nations ==
For the team rosters see: Basketball at the 1960 Summer Olympics – Men's team rosters.

- Brazil (12)
- Bulgaria (12)
- Czechoslovakia (12)
- France (12)
- Hungary (12)
- Italy (12)
- Japan (12)
- Mexico (12)
- Philippines (12)
- Poland (12)
- Puerto Rico (12)
- Soviet Union (12)
- Spain (12)
- United States (12)
- Uruguay (12)
- Yugoslavia (12)

== Results ==
=== Preliminary round ===
==== Group A ====
Pos	Team	Pld	W	L	PF	PA	PD	Pts	Qualification
1	United States	3	3	0	320	183	+137	6	Semifinals
2	Italy (H)	3	2	1	226	247	−21	5	Semifinals
3	Hungary	3	1	2	223	245	−22	4	9th–16th classification round
4	Japan	3	0	3	224	318	−94	3	9th–16th classification round

Source: FIBA archive
Rules for classification: 1) points; 2) head-to-head points; 3) head-to-head goal average; 4) head-to-head number of points scored.
(H) Hosts

August 26
9:00

Hungary	93–66	Japan
Scoring by half: 43–28, 53–38
Pts: Bencze (25)		Pts: Ohshima (14)

Palazzetto dello sport, Rome
Referees: J. Sanchez Padilla (Uruguay)
S. Siniakov (Soviet Union)

August 26
21:30

United States	88–54	Italy
Scoring by half: 42–17, 46–37
Pts: Smith (18)		Pts: Lombardi (17)

Palazzetto dello sport, Rome
Referees: R. Weber (Switzerland)
B. Takev (Bulgaria)

August 27
16:00

United States	125–66	Japan
Scoring by half: 65–36, 60–30
Pts: Lucas (28)		Pts: Shoji (13)

Palazzetto dello sport, Rome
Referees: R. Righetto (Brazil)
B. Harvey (New Zealand)

August 27
23:00

Italy	72–67	Hungary
Scoring by half: 40–37, 32–30
Pts: Pieri (15)		Pts: Gabányi (15)

Palazzetto dello sport, Rome
Referees: K. Klima (Czechoslovakia)
J. Sanchez Padilla (Uruguay)

August 29
9:00

United States	107–63	Hungary
Scoring by half: 48–34, 59–29
Pts: Robertson (22)		Pts: Bánhegyi, Temesvári (22)

Palazzetto dello sport, Rome
Referees: R. Weber (Switzerland)
Azuar (Spain)

August 29
17:30

Japan	92–100	Italy
Scoring by half: 43–59, 49–41
Pts: Riminucci, Gavagnin (16)		Pts: Suigyama, Nara (12)

Palazzetto dello sport, Rome
Referees: N. Charganov (Soviet Union)
Bilek (Turkey)

==== Group B ====
Pos	Team	Pld	W	L	PF	PA	PD	Pts	Qualification
1	Czechoslovakia	3	2	1	201	192	+9	5 (Note: Head-to-head record: Czechoslovakia 1–0 Yugoslavia)	Semifinals
2	Yugoslavia	3	2	1	193	199	−6	5	Semifinals
3	France	3	1	2	187	190	−3	4 (Note: Head-to-head record: France1–0 Bulgaria)	9th–16th classification round
4	Bulgaria	3	1	2	209	209	0	4	9th–16th classification round

Source: FIBA archive
Rules for classification: 1) points; 2) head-to-head points; 3) head-to-head goal average; 4) head-to-head number of points scored.
Notes:

August 26
16:00

Bulgaria	62–67	Yugoslavia
Scoring by half: 30–35, 32–32
Pts: Mirtchev (14)		Pts: Djuric (23)

Palazzetto dello sport, Rome
Referees: E. Alvarez Frausto (Mexico)
C. Sien (Singapore)

August 26
17:30

France	53–56	Czechoslovakia
Scoring by half: 22–26, 31–30
Pts: Dorigo (17)		Pts: Tomasek (16)

Palazzetto dello sport, Rome
Referees: R. Righetto (Brazil)
N. Charganov (Soviet Union)

August 27
9:00

France	61–62	Yugoslavia
Scoring by half: 35–32, 26–30
Pts: Dorigo (15)		Pts: Korac (23)

Palazzetto dello sport, Rome
Referees: N. Charganov (Soviet Union)
P. Reverberi (Italy)

August 27
10:30

Czechoslovakia	69–75	Bulgaria
Scoring by half: 43–39, 26–36
Pts: Pieri (15)		Pts: Gabanyi (15)

Palazzetto dello sport, Rome
Referees: R. Weber (Switzerland)
S. Siniakov (Soviet Union)

August 29
10:30

Yugoslavia	64–76	Czechoslovakia
Scoring by half: 35–40, 29–36
Pts: Korac (25)		Pts: Baumruk (27)

Palazzetto dello sport, Rome
Referees: G. Sussi (Italy)
S. Siniakov (Soviet Union)

August 29
20:00

France	73–72	Bulgaria
Scoring by half: 32–30, 41–42
Pts: Grange (21)		Pts: Mirtchev (22)

Palazzetto dello sport, Rome
Referees: D. Shirley (United States)
Bilek (Japan)

==== Group C ====
Pos	Team	Pld	W	L	PF	PA	PD	Pts	Qualification
1	Brazil	3	3	0	213	198	+15	6	Semifinals
2	Soviet Union	3	2	1	220	170	+50	5	Semifinals
3	Mexico	3	1	2	189	210	−21	4	9th–16th classification round
4	Puerto Rico	3	0	3	199	243	−44	3	9th–16th classification round

Source: FIBA archive
Rules for classification: 1) points; 2) head-to-head points; 3) head-to-head goal average; 4) head-to-head number of points scored.

August 26
10:30

Soviet Union	66–49	Mexico
Scoring by half: 28–17, 38–32
Pts: Valdman (13)		Pts: Almanza (15)

Palazzetto dello sport, Rome
Referees: G. Follati (Italy)
T. Hata (Japan)

August 26
20:00

Puerto Rico	72–75	Brazil
Scoring by half: 35–33, 37–42
Pts: Walle (22)		Pts: Pasos (18)

Palazzetto dello sport, Rome
Referees: P. Reverberi (Italy)
K. Klima (Czechoslovakia)

August 27
14:30

Mexico	68–64	Puerto Rico
Scoring by half: 34–26, 34–38
Pts: A. Herrera (27)		Pts: Vicens (15)

Palazzetto dello sport, Rome
Referees: G. Sussi (Italy)
B. Takev (Bulgaria)

August 27
21:30

Soviet Union	54–58	Brazil
Scoring by half: 23–28, 31–30
Pts: Blatskauskas, Pasos (14)		Pts: Muzhniek (14)

Palazzetto dello sport, Rome
Referees: D. Shirley (United States)
E. Kassai (Hungary)

August 29
21:30

Brazil	80–72 (OT)	Mexico
Scoring by half: 29–32, 32–29 Overtime: 19–11
Pts: Pasos (19)		Pts: A. Herrera (22)

Palazzetto dello sport, Rome
Referees: E. Luglini (Italy)
C. Sien (Singapore)

August 29
23:00

Soviet Union	100–63	Puerto Rico
Scoring by half: 36–29, 64–35
Pts: Korneev (18)		Pts: Vicens (14)

Palazzetto dello sport, Rome
Referees: P. Reverberi (Italy)
Skyloyannis (Greece)

==== Group D ====
Pos	Team	Pld	W	L	PF	PA	PD	Pts	Qualification
1	Uruguay	3	2	1	228	225	+3	5 (Note: Head-to-head record: Uruguay 1–0 Poland)	Semifinals
2	Poland	3	2	1	233	207	+26	5	Semifinals
3	Philippines	3	1	2	228	248	−20	4 (Note: Head-to-head record: Philippines 1–0 Spain)	9th–16th classification round
4	Spain	3	1	2	222	231	−9	4	9th–16th classification round

Source: FIBA archive
Rules for classification: 1) points; 2) head-to-head points; 3) head-to-head goal average; 4) head-to-head number of points scored.
Notes:

August 26
14:30

Philippines	68–86	Poland
Scoring by half: 31–44, 37–42
Pts: Badion (17)		Pts: Nartowski (29)

Palazzetto dello sport, Rome
Referees: V. Pinto (Italy)
E. Kassai (Hungary)

August 26
23:00

Uruguay	72–77	Spain
Scoring by half: 30–41, 42–36
Pts: Mera (16)		Pts: E. Rodriguez (18)

Palazzetto dello sport, Rome
Referees: D. Shirley (United States)
G. Sussi (Italy)

August 27
17:30

Spain	82–84	Philippines
Scoring by half: 33–35, 49–49
Pts: Luis (20)		Pts: Yburan (16)

Palazzetto dello sport, Rome
Referees: G. Follati (Italy)
M. Minic (Socialist Federal Republic of Yugoslavia)

August 27
20:00

Uruguay	76–72	Poland
Scoring by half: 39–38, 37–34
Pts: Poyet (15)		Pts: Wichowski (29)

Palazzetto dello sport, Rome
Referees: E. Alvarez Frausto (Mexico)
E. Luglini (Italy)

August 29
14:30

Uruguay	80–76	Philippines
Scoring by half: 38–37, 42–39
Pts: Blixen (23)		Pts: Bernardo (29)

Palazzetto dello sport, Rome
Referees: E. Luglini (Italy)
C. Sien (Singapore)

August 29
16:00

Poland	75–63	Spain
Scoring by half: 36–29, 64–35
Pts: Wichowski, Sitkowski (21)		Pts: Rodriguez (17)

Palazzetto dello sport, Rome
Referees: E. Kassai (Hungary)
V. Pinto (Italy)

=== Classification 9–16 ===
==== Pool C ====
Pos	Team	Pld	W	L	PF	PA	PD	Pts	Qualification
1	Hungary	3	3	0	167	150	+17	6	9th–12th classification round
2	Philippines	3	2	1	154	161	−7	5	9th–12th classification round
3	Puerto Rico	3	1	2	162	166	−4	4	13th–16th classification round
4	Bulgaria	3	0	3	0	6	−6	0	13th–16th classification round

Source: FIBA archive
Rules for classification: 1) points; 2) head-to-head points; 3) head-to-head goal average; 4) head-to-head number of points scored.

September 1
14:30

Hungary	2–0 (forfeit)	Bulgaria

Palazzetto dello sport, Rome

September 1
16:00

Philippines	82–80	Puerto Rico
Scoring by half: 41–42, 41–38
Pts: Ortiz (21)		Pts: Valle (28)

Palazzetto dello sport, Rome
Referees: G. Follati (Italy)
M. Minic (Socialist Federal Republic of Yugoslavia)

September 2
9:00

Hungary	84–80 (OT)	Puerto Rico
Scoring by half: 39–37, 35–37 Overtime: 10–6
Pts: Gabányi (23)		Pts: Vicens (28)

Palazzetto dello sport, Rome
Referees: G. Sussi (Italy)
Nikou (Iran)

September 2
10:30

Bulgaria	0–2 (forfeit)	Philippines

Palazzetto dello sport, Rome

September 3
14:30

Puerto Rico	2–0 (forfeit)	Bulgaria

Palazzetto dello sport, Rome

September 3
16:00

Hungary	81–70	Philippines
Scoring by half: 35–28, 46–42
Pts: Gabányi (25)		Pts: Ortiz (16)

Palazzetto dello sport, Rome
Referees: R. Righetto (Brazil)
E. Luglini (Italy)

==== Pool D ====
Pos	Team	Pld	W	L	PF	PA	PD	Pts	Qualification
1	France	3	3	0	270	173	+97	6	9th–12th classification round
2	Mexico	3	2	1	218	214	+4	5	9th–12th classification round
3	Spain	3	1	2	180	222	−42	4	13th–16th classification round
4	Japan	3	0	3	184	243	−59	3	13th–16th classification round

Source: FIBA archive
Rules for classification: 1) points; 2) head-to-head points; 3) head-to-head goal average; 4) head-to-head number of points scored.

September 1
9:00

Spain	66–80	Mexico
Scoring by half: 32–31, 44–49
Pts: E. Rodriguez (22)		Pts: Almanza (28)

Palazzetto dello sport, Rome
Referees: K. Klima (Czechoslovakia)
J. Sanchez Padilla (Uruguay)

September 1
10:30

France	101–63	Japan
Scoring by half: 34–30, 67–33
Pts: Beugnot (23)		Pts: Itoyama, Sugiyama (10)

Palazzetto dello sport, Rome
Referees: R. Righetto (Brazil)
E. Luglini (Italy)

September 2
14:30

Japan	57–76	Mexico
Scoring by half: 30–34, 27–43
Pts: Itoyama (12)		Pts: Almanza (21)

Palazzetto dello sport, Rome
Referees: P. Reverberi (Italy)
N. Charganov (Soviet Union)

September 2
16:00

France	78–48	Spain
Scoring by half: 39–18, 39–30
Pts: Beugnot (18)		Pts: Martinez (24)

Palazzetto dello sport, Rome
Referees: G. Follati (Italy)
S. Siniakov (Soviet Union)

September 3
9:00

Spain	66–64	Japan
Scoring by half: 32–34, 34–30
Pts: E. Rodriguez (24)		Pts: Nara (15)

Palazzetto dello sport, Rome
Referees: V. Pinto (Italy)
N. Charganov (Soviet Union)

September 3
10:00

France	91–62	Mexico
Scoring by half: 41–33, 50–29
Pts: Antoine, Dorigo (19)		Pts: Almanza (17)

Palazzetto dello sport, Rome
Referees: J. Sanchez Padilla (Uruguay)
P. Reverberi (Italy)

==== Classification 13–16 ====
- Spain's victory over Japan carried over, as did Puerto Rico's win in Bulgaria's forfeit.

Pos	Team	Pld	W	L	PF	PA	PD	Pts
13	Puerto Rico	2	2	0	168	138	+30	4
14	Spain	2	1	1	131	139	−8	3
15	Japan	2	0	2	137	159	−22	2

Source: FIBA archive
Rules for classification: 1) points; 2) head-to-head points; 3) head-to-head goal average; 4) head-to-head number of points scored.

September 7
10:00

Puerto Rico	75–65	Spain
Scoring by half: 39–27, 36–38
Pts: Walle (23)		Pts: Martinez (23)

Palazzo dello Sport, Rome
Referees: K. Klima (Czechoslovakia)
C. Sien (Singapore)

September 9
10:00

Puerto Rico	93–73	Japan
Scoring by half: 46–32, 47–41
Pts: T. Cruz (23)		Pts: Shoji (16)

Palazzo dello Sport, Rome
Referees: E. Luglini (Italy)
E. Kassai (Hungary)

==== Classification 9–12 ====
France's victory over Mexico and Hungary's over the Philippines carried over.

Pos	Team	Pld	W	L	PF	PA	PD	Pts
9	Hungary	3	2	1	212	209	+3	5 (Note: Head-to-head: Hungary 1–0 France)
10	France	3	2	1	283	211	+72	5
11	Philippines	3	1	2	210	267	−57	4 (Note: Head-to-head: Philippines 1–0 Mexico)
12	Mexico	3	1	2	195	213	−18	4

Source: FIBA archive
Rules for classification: 1) points; 2) head-to-head points; 3) head-to-head goal average; 4) head-to-head number of points scored.
Notes:

September 8
10:00

Hungary	57–69	Mexico
Scoring by half: 28–39, 29–30
Pts: Gabányi (16)		Pts: Almanza (27)

Palazzo dello Sport, Rome
Referees: V. Pinto (Italy)
Perazzo (Australia)

September 8
11:30

France	122–75	Philippines
Scoring by half: 59–32, 63–43
Pts: Dorigo (23)		Pts: Ortiz (16)

Palazzo dello Sport, Rome
Referees: P. Reverberi (Italy)
N. Charganov (Soviet Union)

September 10
10:00

Philippines	65–64	Mexico
Scoring by half: 37–31, 28–33
Pts: Bernardo (26)		Pts: Almanza (26)

Palazzo dello Sport, Rome
Referees: J. Sanchez Padilla (Uruguay)
Harvey (New Zealand)

September 10
11:30

Hungary	74–70	France
Scoring by half: 40–28, 34–42
Pts: Gabányi (21)		Pts: Beugnot (16)

Palazzo dello Sport, Rome
Referees: M. Minic (Socialist Federal Republic of Yugoslavia)
Saltiel (Israel)

=== Semifinals ===
==== Pool A ====
Pos	Team	Pld	W	L	PF	PA	PD	Pts	Qualification
1	Brazil	3	3	0	240	221	+19	6	Medal round
2	Italy (H)	3	2	1	226	216	+10	5	Medal round
3	Czechoslovakia	3	1	2	236	237	−1	4	5th–8th classification round
4	Poland	3	0	3	211	239	−28	3	5th–8th classification round

Source: FIBA archive
Rules for classification: 1) points; 2) head-to-head points; 3) head-to-head goal average; 4) head-to-head number of points scored.
(H) Hosts

September 1
21:30

Brazil	78–75 (OT)	Italy
Scoring by half: 29–39, 41–31 Overtime: 8–5
Pts: Marques, Pasos (18)		Pts: Alesini (18)

Palazzetto dello sport, Rome
Referees: R. Klima (Switzerland)
B. Takev (Bulgaria)

September 1
23:00

Czechoslovakia	88–75	Poland
Scoring by half: 44–30, 44–45
Pts: Baumruk (18)		Pts: Wichowski (24)

Palazzetto dello sport, Rome
Referees: E. Kassai (Hungary)
Aznar (Spain)

September 2
20:00

Brazil	77–68	Poland
Scoring by half: 39–46, 38–22
Pts: Baumruk, Konecny (18)		Pts: Wichowski (24)

Palazzetto dello sport, Rome
Referees: B. Takev (Bulgaria)
Harvey (New Zealand)

September 2
23:00

Czechoslovakia	70–77	Italy
Scoring by half: 34–37, 36–40
Pts: Tomasek (14)		Pts: Alesini (12)

Palazzetto dello sport, Rome
Referees: Skyloyannis (Greece)
Bilek (Turkey)

September 3
20:00

Italy	74–68	Poland
Scoring by half: 40–32, 34–36
Pts: Alesini (12)		Pts: Wichowski (16)

Palazzetto dello sport, Rome
Referees: Bilek (Turkey)
T. Hata (Japan)

September 3
21:30

Czechoslovakia	78–85	Brazil
Scoring by half: 30–43, 48–42
Pts: Baumruk (23)		Pts: Pasos (25)

Palazzetto dello sport, Rome
Referees: E. Alvarez Frausto (Mexico)
E. Kassai (Hungary)

==== Pool B ====
Pos	Team	Pld	W	L	PF	PA	PD	Pts	Qualification
1	United States	3	3	0	293	149	+144	6	Medal round
2	Soviet Union	3	2	1	234	195	+39	5	Medal round
3	Yugoslavia	3	1	2	197	275	−78	4	5th–8th classification round
4	Uruguay	3	0	3	186	291	−105	3	5th–8th classification round

Source: FIBA archive
Rules for classification: 1) points; 2) head-to-head points; 3) head-to-head goal average; 4) head-to-head number of points scored.

September 1
17:30

Yugoslavia	42–104	United States
Scoring by half: 16–63, 26–41
Pts: Korac (16)		Pts: Robertson (16)

Palazzetto dello sport, Rome
Referees: E. Alvarez Frausto (Mexico)
T. Hata (Japan)

September 1
20:00

Uruguay	53–89	Soviet Union
Scoring by half: 22–42, 31–47
Pts: Scaron (11)		Pts: Ugrekhilidze (16)

Palazzetto dello sport, Rome
Referees: Skyloyannis (Greece)
Bilek (Turkey)

September 2
17:30

Soviet Union	88–61	Yugoslavia
Scoring by half: 44–30, 44–31
Pts: Semenov (19)		Pts: Petricevic (11)

Palazzetto dello sport, Rome
Referees: P. Reverberi (Italy)
N. Charganov (Soviet Union)

September 2
21:30

Uruguay	50–108	United States
Scoring by half: 19–65, 31–43
Pts: Chelle (12)		Pts: Smith (15)

Palazzetto dello sport, Rome
Referees: E. Alvarez Frausto (Mexico)
C. Sien (Singapore)

September 3
17:30

Uruguay	83–94	Yugoslavia
Scoring by half: 35–43, 48–51
Pts: Blixen (21)		Pts: Korac (38)

Palazzetto dello sport, Rome
Referees: V. Pinto (Italy)
N. Charganov (Soviet Union)

September 3
23:00

United States	81–57	Soviet Union
Scoring by half: 35–28, 46–29
Pts: West (19)		Pts: Zubkov (13)

Palazzetto dello sport, Rome
Referees: R. Weber (Switzerland)
B. Takev (Bulgaria)

==== Classification 5–8 ====
Czechoslovakia's victory over Poland and Yugoslavia's win over Uruguay carried over to this round.

Pos	Team	Pld	W	L	PF	PA	PD	Pts
5	Czechoslovakia	3	3	0	284	240	+44	6
6	Yugoslavia	3	2	1	282	262	+20	5
7	Poland	3	1	2	220	245	−25	4
8	Uruguay	3	0	3	217	256	−39	3

Source: FIBA archive
Rules for classification: 1) points; 2) head-to-head points; 3) head-to-head goal average; 4) head-to-head number of points scored.

September 7
21:00

Czechoslovakia	98–72	Uruguay
Scoring by half: 42–36, 56–36
Pts: Baumruk (28)		Pts: Blixen (25)

Palazzo dello Sport, Rome
Referees: G. Sussi (Italy)
T. Hata (Japan)

September 7
23:30

Yugoslavia	95–81	Poland
Scoring by half: 55–44, 40–37
Pts: Korac (33)		Pts: Wichowski (24)

Palazzo dello Sport, Rome
Referees: R. Righetto (Brazil)
G. Follati (Italy)

September 9
21:00

Poland	64–62	Uruguay
Scoring by half: 35–31, 29–31
Pts: Sitkowski (14)		Pts: Blixen (18)

Palazzo dello Sport, Rome
Referees: R. Weber (Switzerland)
B. Takev (Bulgaria)

September 9
22:30

Czechoslovakia	98–93	Yugoslavia
Scoring by half: 38–45, 60–48
Pts: Baumruk (32)		Pts: Korac (29)

Palazzo dello Sport, Rome
Referees: R. Righetto (Brazil)
N. Charganov (Soviet Union)

==== Medal round ====
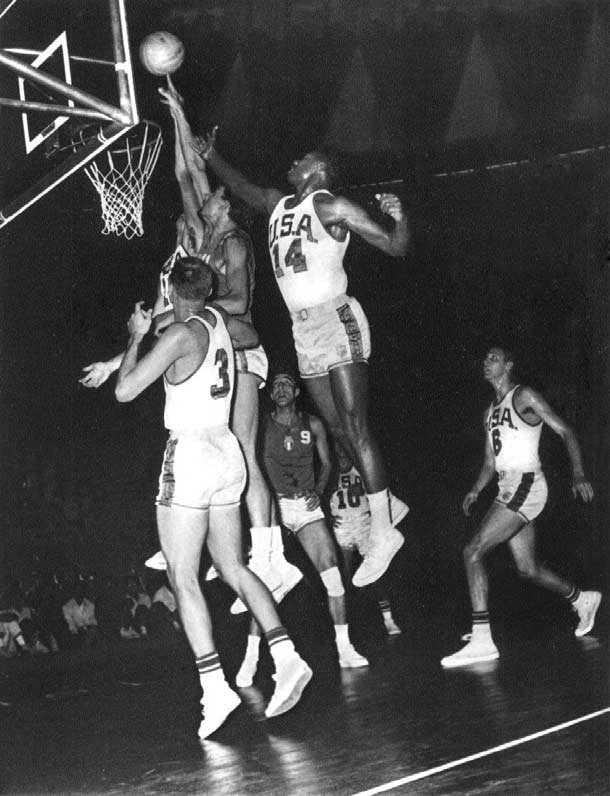
USA vs Italy

The United States' win over the Soviet Union and Brazil's victory over Italy carried over.

Pos	Team	Pld	W	L	PF	PA	PD	Pts
1	United States	3	3	0	283	201	+82	6
2	Soviet Union	3	2	1	199	213	−14	5
3	Brazil	3	1	2	203	229	−26	4
4	Italy (H)	3	0	3	226	268	−42	3

Source: FIBA archive
Rules for classification: 1) points; 2) head-to-head points; 3) head-to-head goal average; 4) head-to-head number of points scored.
(H) Hosts

September 8
21:00

Brazil	62–64	Soviet Union
Scoring by half: 32–28, 30–36
Pts: Marques (25)		Pts: Voljnov (19)

Palazzo dello Sport, Rome
Referees: R. Weber (Switzerland)
Bilek (Turkey)

September 8
22:30

United States	112–81	Italy
Scoring by half: 56–48, 56–33
Pts: Robertson (22)		Pts: Lombardi (23)

Palazzo dello Sport, Rome
Referees: J. Sanchez Padilla (Uruguay)
M. Minic (Socialist Federal Republic of Yugoslavia)

September 10
21:00

Italy	70–78	Soviet Union
Scoring by half: 32–34, 38–44
Pts: Alesini (19)		Pts: Petrov (20)

Palazzo dello Sport, Rome
Referees: K. Klima (Czechoslovakia)
Skyloyannis (Greece)

September 10
22:30

Brazil	63–90	United States
Scoring by half: 24–50, 39–40
Pts: Marques (19)		Pts: Lucas (23)

Palazzo dello Sport, Rome
Referees: E. Alvarez Frausto (Mexico)
E. Kassai (Hungary)

== Awards ==
1960 Olympic Basketball Champions

United States
Fifth title

== Final ranking ==
Rank	Team
1st place, gold medalist(s)	United States
2nd place, silver medalist(s)	Soviet Union
3rd place, bronze medalist(s)	Brazil
4th	Italy
5th	Czechoslovakia
6th	SFR Yugoslavia
7th	Poland
8th	Uruguay
9th	Hungary
10th	France
11th	Philippines
12th	Mexico
13th	Puerto Rico
14th	Spain
15th	Japan
16th	Bulgaria
