= Gentlemen in White Vests =

1970 film

- Directed by: Wolfgang Staudte
- Written by: Horst Wendlandt; Paul Hengge
- Produced by: Fritz Klotsch; Horst Wendlandt
- Starring: Martin Held; Walter Giller; Heinz Erhardt; Mario Adorf
- Cinematography: Karl Löb
- Edited by: Jane Seitz
- Music by: Peter Thomas
- Production company: Rialto Film
- Distributed by: United Artists
- Release date: 12 March 1970
- Running time: 91 minutes
- Country: West Germany
- Language: German

Gentlemen in White Vests (German: Die Herren mit der weißen Weste) is a 1970 German comedy film directed by Wolfgang Staudte and starring Martin Held, Walter Giller and Heinz Erhardt.

It was shot at the Spandau Studios and on location around Berlin at the Olympiastadion, Tempelhof Airport and Charlottenburg.

== Plot ==
At the beginning of the film, gangster Bruno Stiegler alias Dandy returns to West Berlin from the United States as a boxing promoter. The boxing business serves him more as a camouflage, however, because soon it turns out that he and his gang want to realize various planned raids. The now retired Judge Zänker has tried in vain to put Dandy behind bars by legal means during his active service. Now he turns the tables with his friends and sister Elisabeth. His old friends and colleagues meet as a men's choir disguised in his home and prove to be a pensioner's gang, taking on Dandy's gang. He succeeds in this by using the ex-con Pietsch as a snitch in Dandy's gang.

Dandy wants to steal the revenue from a Hertha BSC football match at the Olympic Stadium, but Zänker and his gang are faster in doing so. The same is achieved by them with Dandy's attempt to rob dubious businessman Kunkelmann's cash cabinet and clean out the Haase jewellery store during a parade. To make matters more complicated, Zänker's son-in-law Walter, who lives with his daughter Monika in the house near Zänker, works as a criminal inspector with the police and is charged with investigating these crimes. In fact, Walter's supervisor, Berg, eventually appears in person at his old friend's house to arrest him. In a conversation under four eyes, Zänker explains his motive and method and gains Berg's confidence. So an arrest warrant goes out for Dandy, and Zänker manages, with the help of Pietsch, to pin the blame for all the thefts on Dandy. Immediately before Dandy's departure, all the stolen items are found in his suitcase. As a result, the police have probable cause to arrest Dandy. So in retirement Zänker has finally achieved what he never managed to do legally as a judge.

== Cast ==
- Martin Held as Oberlandesgerichtsrat a. D. Herbert Zänker
- Walter Giller as Inspektor Walter Knauer
- Heinz Erhardt as Heinrich Scheller
- Mario Adorf as Dandy Stiegler
- Agnes Windeck as Elisabeth Zänker
- Hannelore Elsner as Susan
- Rudolf Platte as Pietsch
- Willy Reichert as Kriminalrat a.D. Otto Sikorski
- Sabine Bethmann as Monika Knauer
- Rudolf Schündler as Diplomingenieur Willy Stademann
- Herbert Fux as Luigi Pinelli
- Siegfried Schürenberg as Kommissar Berg
- Wilhelm von Homburg as Boxer Max Graf
- Otto Graf
- Max Nosseck
