= Ronald Redrup =

British boxer

Personal information
- Nationality: British
- Born: 30 May 1935; West Ham, London, England
- Died: 5 April 2013 (aged 77)

Sport
- Sport: Boxing

Ronald Redrup (30 May 1935 – 5 April 2013) was a British boxer. He competed in the men's middleweight event at the 1956 Summer Olympics. He fought as Ron Redrup.

Redrup won the 1956 Amateur Boxing Association British middleweight title, when boxing out of the West Ham ABC.
