= Bruce Wells =

English boxer

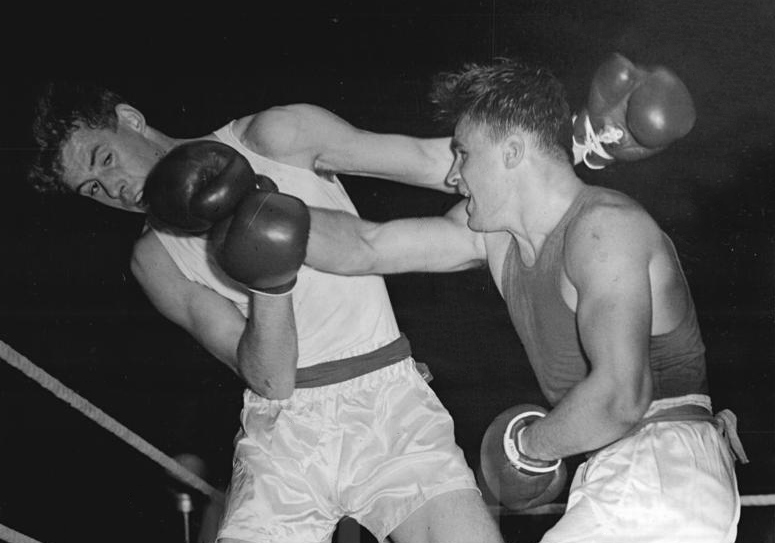
- Gennadiy Shatkov (right) v. Wells, 15 October 1955

Personal information
- Nationality: British (English)
- Born: 7 July 1933 Harlesden, Middlesex
- Died: 14 November 2009 (aged 76) Camberley, Surrey
- Weight: Light Middleweight

Boxing career
- Stance: Orthodox

Boxing record
- Total fights: 388
- Wins: 385
- Losses: 3

Bruce Albert Wells (7 July 1933 – 14 November 2009) was an English amateur boxer, holder of the ABA Light Middleweight and European Amateur Boxing Championship titles. The magazine Boxing News described him as an "ex-amateur star".

His career win count is 385 – 3.

== Career ==
Wells was born in Harlesden, Middlesex, and after moving to Reading as a boy, he joined the local Reading Aero Boxing Club and readily took to the game. He went on to win Junior ABA Welterweight titles in 1949 and 1950, and also claimed the Gold Star beating Joe Erskine.

In 1951 he made his international début at Belle Vue against the USA, completely out-boxing New Yorker, Randy Sandy and dominating the proceedings with his long left lead.

Wells started 1953 in fine style, chalking up a victory against Ireland at the Royal Albert Hall, following two successes in Denmark, before he attempted to win the ABA Championships.

On 24 April he outscored Scotland's Len Mullen in a semi-final at Wembley, and later that evening was crowned ABA Light Middleweight champion, outpointing Brixton eel-dresser Roy Francis, who was to become one of Britain's best known referees.

Fortified by ABA success, Wells, along with six other ABA champions, which included a young Henry Cooper, headed for the European Amateur Boxing Championships in Warsaw, and eventually clinched Gold, beating Polish National Hero Zbigniew Pietrzykowski, who was himself to go on and win a total of four European titles.

1953 was also a great year outside the ring, as on 10 December, Wells was honoured as one of the Sport Writers Association, Sportsman of the Year, along with Don Cockell, Sir Stanley Matthews, Alec Bedser, Jim Peters and Mike Hawthorn.

In 1954 Wells went on to retain his ABA Crown outpointing Irishman Andy Keogh in the final at Wembley, before captaining the European team in the prestigious International Golden Gloves matches in the USA, outclassing Art Glass and Leslie Temple in Chicago and St Louis respectively.

At the end of July, Wells flew to Vancouver to represent the English team for 1954 British Empire and Commonwealth Games, reaching the semi-final. A horrendous head-on clash after only two minutes and ten seconds of the bout ruled both men out of the championships, although Wells gained the verdict and the bronze medal, by reason of majority point decision. Wells eye injury later required eight stitches and was forced to withdraw from the tournament.

Plagued by weight problems and difficulties outside the ring, Wells suffered his third and final reverse to West Germany's Hans Rienhardt in an International match at Wembley.

After stepping up to middleweight, his last major bout was to be against the Olympic and European champion, Gennadiy Shatkov. Although the Great Britain team was drubbed 8–2 in the International competition, Wells won his bout, outpointing Shatkov over three rounds.

After retiring from competitive boxing, Wells became a stunt artist, working on various films and TV productions, although in 1977 he participated in a charity boxing exhibition bout with Muhammad Ali, during a visit to South Shields, UK.

In 1968/9 he was employed at Henry Compton school, Fulham as a P.E. teacher. He brought in photos of himself as a stuntman for "You only live twice" scaling down the volcano

== TV/Film credits ==
- The Servant (1963) - Sidewalk Painter (uncredited)
- Dr. Who and the Daleks (1965) - Thal
- Doctor Who (1966–1973) - Ogron / Cyberman / Alien Guard / Union Recruit (uncredited)
- Romany Jones (1972) - Farmhand
- Get Some In! (1976) - RAF regiment
- Minder (1984) - Boxing Referee (final television appearance)

== Exhibition boxing record ==
1 fight	1 win	0 losses
By knockout	1	0

No.	Result	Record	Opponent	Type	Round, time	Date	Location	Notes
1	Win	1–0	(United States) Muhammad Ali	KO	?	Aug 12, 1977	(United Kingdom) South Shields, England	
