= Al Andrews =

American football player (1945–2025)

No. 56
- Position: Linebacker

Personal information
- Born: July 10, 1945; Oakland, California, U.S.
- Died: November 20, 2025 (aged 80); Snellville, Georgia, U.S.
- Listed height: 6 ft 3 in (1.91 m)
- Listed weight: 216 lb (98 kg)

Career information
- High school: Oakland Tech (Oakland, California)
- College: New Mexico State
- NFL draft: 1970: undrafted

Career history
- Buffalo Bills (1970–1971)

Career NFL statistics
- Sacks: 1.5
- Fumble recoveries: 1
- Interceptions: 1
- Stats at Pro Football Reference

Alvin Wayne Andrews (July 10, 1945 – November 20, 2025) was an American professional football linebacker in the National Football League (NFL). He played for the Buffalo Bills in 1970 and 1971.

Andrews died at his residence in Snellville, Georgia, on November 20, 2025, after a long battle with dementia and Alzheimer's disease. He was 80.
