= Ralph Hosack =

Canadian boxer (1935–2026)

Personal information
- Full name: Ralph Robert Hosack
- Nationality: Canadian
- Born: December 3, 1935
- Died: October 11, 2026 (aged 90) Stony Plain, Alberta, Canada

Sport
- Sport: Boxing

Ralph Robert Hosack (December 3, 1935 – October 11, 2026) was a Canadian boxer. He competed in the men's middleweight event at the 1956 Summer Olympics.

Hosack died on October 11, 2026, at the age of 90.
