= Sporthalle (Cologne) =

Indoor arena in Cologne, Germany

Coordinates: 50°56′45″N 6°58′46″E

- Interactive map of Sporthalle
- Location: Cologne, Germany
- Capacity: 8,000

Construction
- Opened: 1958
- Closed: 1998
- Demolished: March 13, 1999

Tenant
- BSC Saturn Köln (1977–1993)

Sporthalle was an indoor arena located in Cologne, Germany. It was primarily used for basketball, other indoor sporting events and concerts until it closed due to the larger Lanxess Arena opening. The arena held 8,000 spectators and opened in 1958. It hosted the 1982 European Champions Cup final and was the regular home venue for BSC Saturn Köln basketball team.

== Concerts ==
In 1979, Queen performed a concert during the Jazz Tour, 1980 during The Game Tour, and two nights in 1982 during the Hot Space Tour.

Preceded by Rhénus Sport; Strasbourg	FIBA European Champions Cup; Final Venue; 1982	Succeeded by Palais des Sports; Grenoble
