= Zbigniew Piórkowski =

Polish boxer

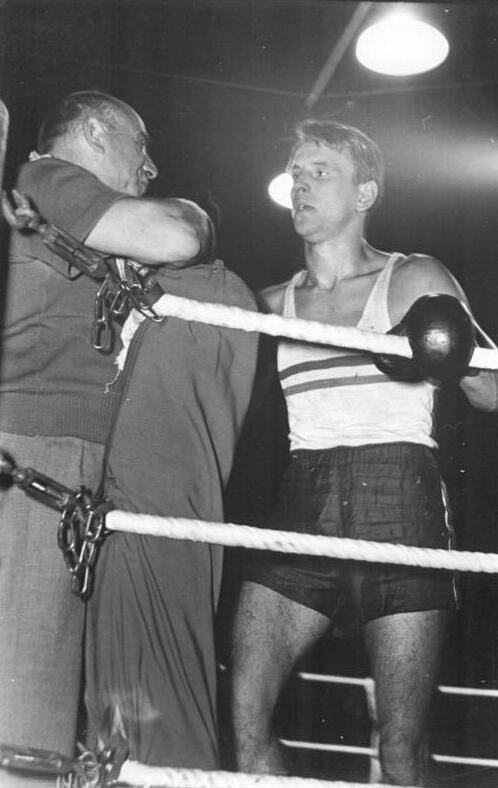
- Zbigniew Piórkowski in 1953

Personal information
- Nationality: Polish
- Born: 2 July 1929; Łódź, Poland
- Died: 10 July 1994 (aged 65); Łódź, Poland

Sport
- Sport: Boxing

Zbigniew Piórkowski (2 July 1929 – 10 July 1994) was a Polish boxer. He competed in the men's middleweight event at the 1956 Summer Olympics.
