= Palazzetto dello Sport =

Basketball venues in Italy

- PalaTiziano
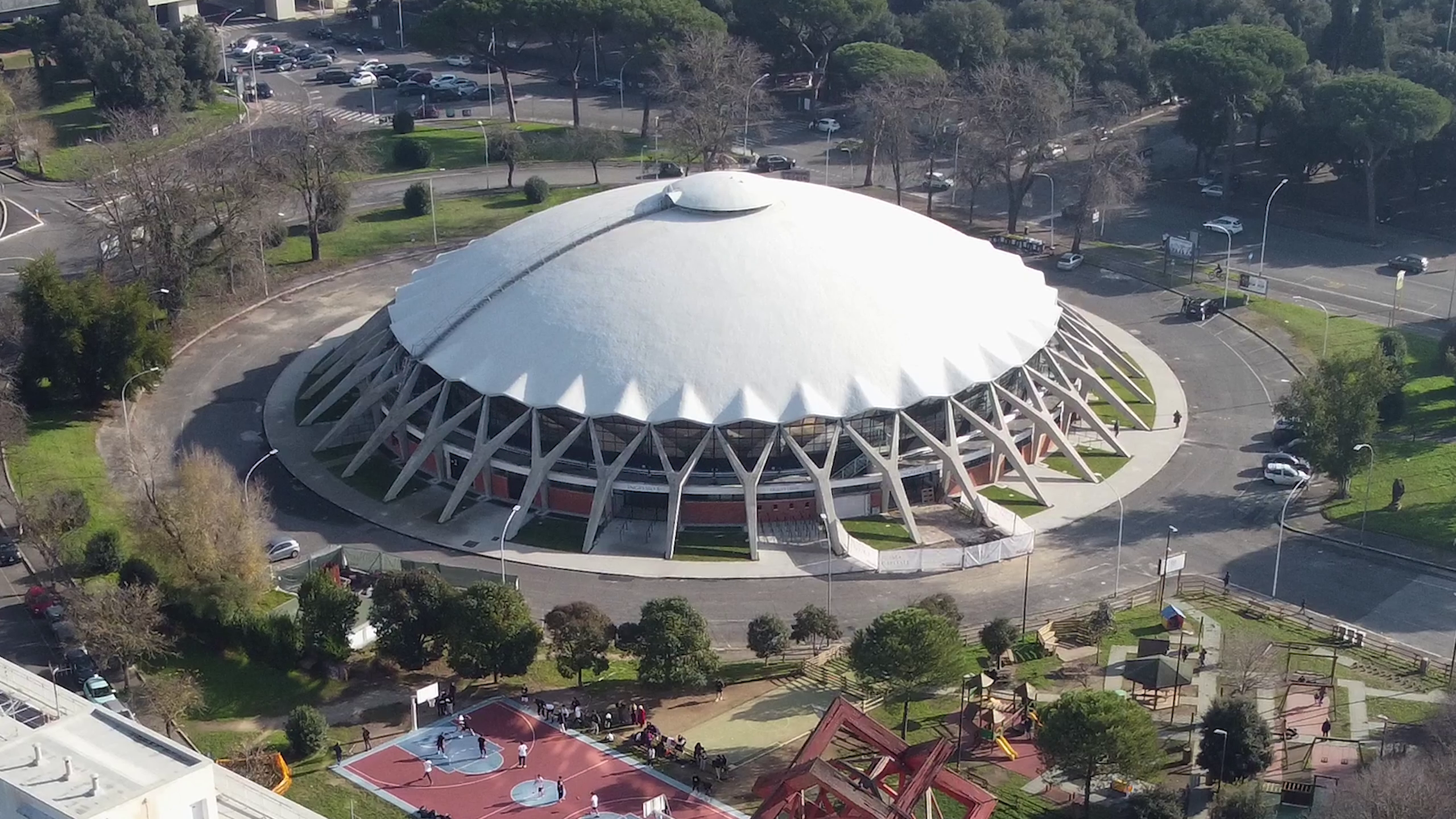
- Interactive map of Palazzetto dello Sport
- Location: Piazza Apollodoro; I-00199 Rome
- Coordinates: 41.929617°N 12.470732°E
- Owner: Municipality of Rome
- Capacity: Basketball: 3,500
- Surface: Parquet

Construction
- Groundbreaking: 1956
- Built: 1957
- Opened: October 1, 1957
- Renovated: 2021–2024
- Architect: Annibale Vitellozzi
- Structural engineer: Pier Luigi Nervi
- Services engineers: Ingg. Nervi & Bartoli

Tenants
- M. Roma Volley (2006–present); Virtus Roma (1960–1983, 2000–2003, 2011–2018); LUISS Roma (2023–present); BC Roma (2026–present)

The Palazzetto dello Sport (literally "Small Sport Palace"), also less commonly known as the PalaTiziano or PalaFlaminio, is an indoor arena that is located in Piazza Apollodoro, in Rome, Italy. It has a 3,500 seating capacity for basketball games.

== History ==
The venue was constructed along with the 11,500-seat Palazzo dello Sport, for the 1960 Summer Olympics. It was inaugurated on October 1, 1957 with a construction cost of $425,000 (USD). Placed between the Auditorium Parco della Musica Ennio Morricone and the Maxxi - Museo Nazionale delle Arti del XXI secolo, the PalaTiziano is relatively close to the Olympic Stadium. It was designed by architect Annibale Vitellozzi. Vitellozzi came up with the design in the year prior. Its reinforced thin-shell concrete dome was engineered by Pier Luigi Nervi under the direction of Engineer Giacomo Maccagno. During the Olympics, the arena hosted the basketball events, among other sports. Since then it has also been used for volleyball matches and other events such as concerts and shows.

Construction began in July 1956 and was completed on September 15, 1957.

Following a long era of disuse the dome was meticulously restored and reopened in October of 2023.

=== Home of Virtus Roma ===
At various times over the years, the arena has been home to the Italian professional basketball team, Virtus Roma. The team played there from its foundation, until the early 1980s, and also for a period of several years at the start of the current millennium, when its regular home venue at the Palazzo dello Sport was being renovated. The team moved back to the arena in 2011, as the Palazzo dello Sport (since renamed PalaLottomatica), had high management costs and Virtus Roma was out of EuroLeague competition at the time. The club moved back to the PalaLottomatica in 2018 as the renovation of PalaTiziano was approaching.

== Design ==
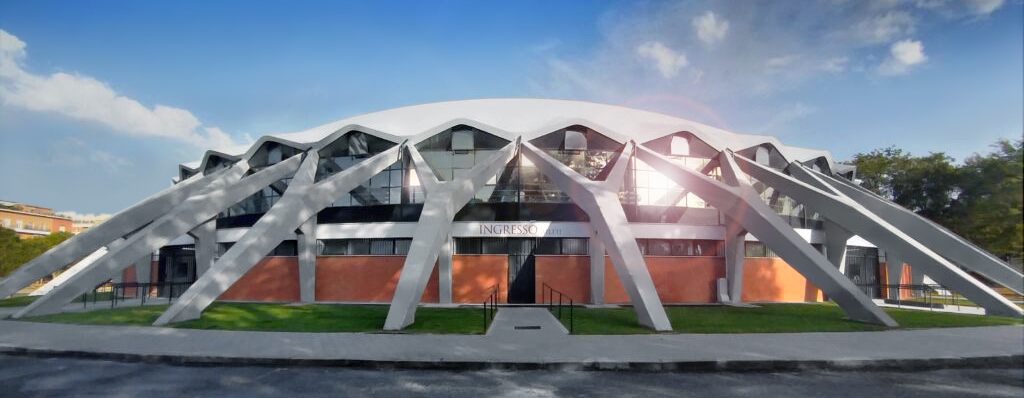
Detail of prefabricated flying buttresses

The facility incorporates a first-aid center, four groups of dressing rooms, along with an officials dressing room, a medical sports centre, a management office, a press room with 12 telephone booths, two store rooms, and basement-located heating and air-conditioning equipment. Seating could be configured for 3,500 basketball spectators and up to 5,600 for boxing or wrestling spectators.

The arena is constructed with a ribbed concrete shell dome, that is 61 meters in diameter, having a total area of about 4,800 square meters, and is constructed of 1,620 prefabricated concrete pieces,which are braced by concrete flying buttresses. Much of the structure was prefabricated, so that the dome was erected in 40 days.

Architect Bruno Zevi remarked that it resembles the Pantheon in some aspects, having many similar features, specifically the spherical shape.

== Restoration ==
After being closed for 5 years, the Palazzetto Dello Sport underwent a renovation in 2018, during the administration of Mayor Virginia Raggi and was finished under incumbent Robert Gualtieri. Initially the city was given a €3 million renovation contract and until March 2022 to complete renovations, but they soon realized it would not be enough. An additional €2 million was raised to finish the project. It was completed in December of 2023.

Renovations included adding 2,500 seats which brought the total seating up to 3,500.

== See also ==
- Norfolk Scope, also by Nervi

Preceded by Real Madrid Pavilion; Madrid	FIBA Intercontinental Cup; Final Venue; 1967	Succeeded by The Spectrum; Philadelphia
