= Dieter Wemhöner =

German boxer

Personal information
- Born: 18 August 1930 (age 95) Berlin, Germany

Sport
- Sport: Boxing
Medal record
Representing Germany
European Championships
Gold medal – first place	1953 Warsaw	-75 kg

Dieter Wemhöner (born 18 August 1930) is a former amateur boxing middleweight who won a gold medal at the 1953 European Amateur Boxing Championships. He represented West Germany in the 1952 Olympics, reaching the third round; and the United Team of Germany at the 1956 Olympics, reaching the second round.

Wemhöner is married and has two sons, Thilo (born 1959) and Jens (born 1961).
