= Ernst Merck =

German businessman and politician (1811–1863)

Freiherr Ernst Merck (20 November 1811 – 6 July 1863) was a German businessman and politician.

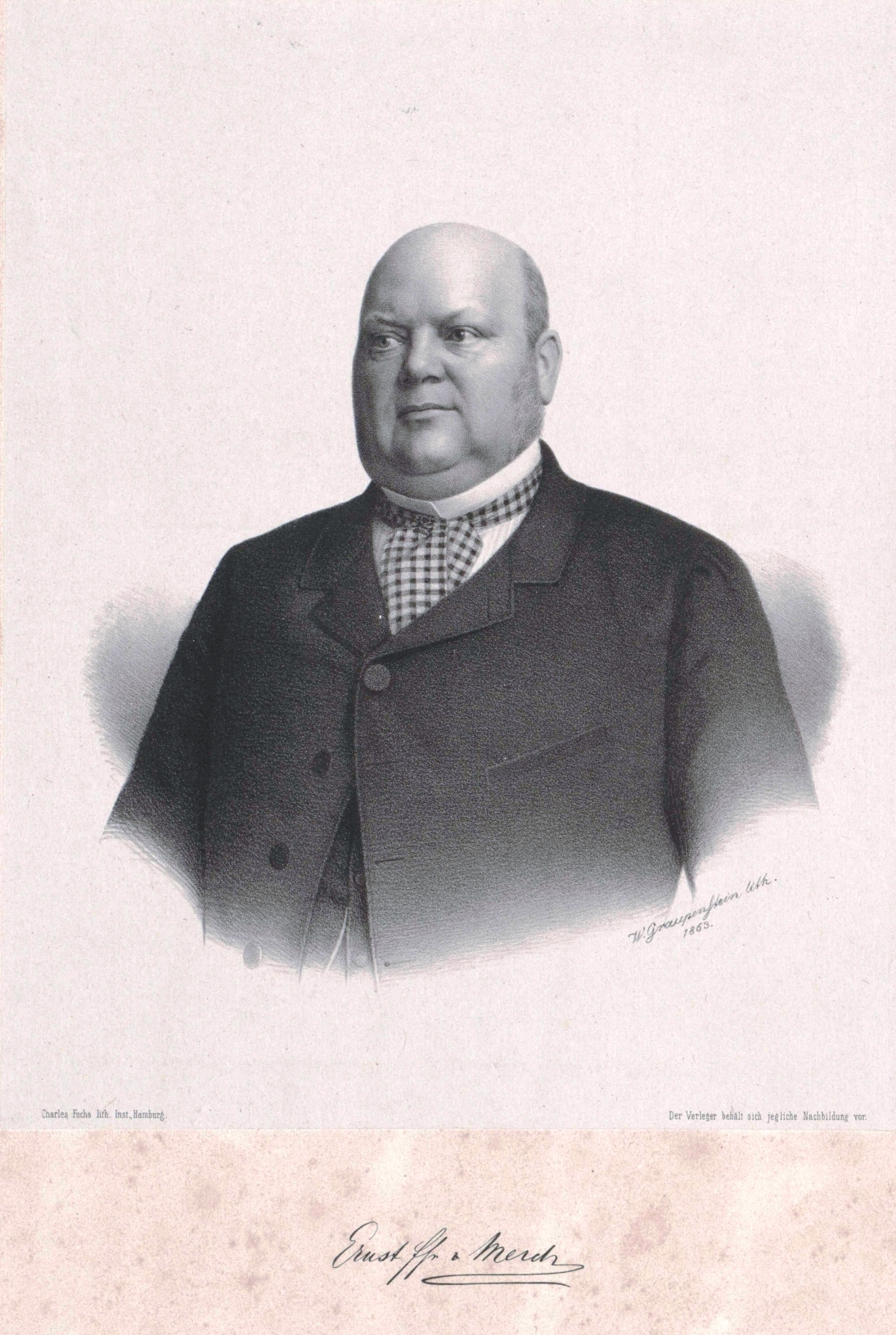
Ernst Freiherr von Merck

Merck, born in Hamburg, was a member of the Frankfurt Parliament for a year from 1848 to 1849.

Merck was also the cavalry chief of the Hamburg Citizen Militia, founder of the Zoological Garden in Hamburg, and initiator of an association to rescue shipwrecked persons.

In 1853, Merck was appointed Austrian Consul General in Hamburg. He invested at that time in the railway lines of Austria and in 1856 co-founded and joined the board of the Empress Elisabeth Railway, named after the Empress of Austria. Thanks to his work, he was raised in 1860 by Emperor Franz Joseph to the rank of baron in the hereditary Austrian nobility. This was not positively received by the citizens of Hamburg, which was a republic. Even his half-brother, Syndicus Carl Merck (1809-1880) took occasion to complain that recently Hanseatic citizens "hunted for Orders and nobility and the other satisfactions for vanity."
