= Ireland at the 1956 Summer Olympics =

- IOC code: IRL
- NOC: Olympic Federation of Ireland
- Website: olympics.ie

in Melbourne/Stockholm
- Competitors: 12 in 4 sports
- Flag bearer: Tony Byrne
- Medals Ranked 21st: Gold 1 Silver 1 Bronze 3 Total 5

Summer Olympics appearances (overview)
- 1924; 1928; 1932; 1936; 1948; 1952; 1956; 1960; 1964; 1968; 1972; 1976; 1980; 1984; 1988; 1992; 1996; 2000; 2004; 2008; 2012; 2016; 2020; 2024

Other related appearances
- Great Britain (1896–1920)

Ireland competed at the 1956 Summer Olympics in Melbourne, Australia and Stockholm, Sweden (equestrian events). As a partial support to the Dutch-led boycott, Irish athletes under the Olympic flag instead of the national flag. Until 2012, it was the nation's most successful Olympic performance, with five medals, three bronze, a silver and a gold.

== Medalists ==
Ireland finished in 21st position in the final medal rankings, with one gold medal and five medals overall. It was the first time Ireland would win medals at two different sports, and the five was a record total for an Irish team at the Olympic Games. This record stood until the 2012 London Olympics, where Ireland won six medals.

Medal	Name	Sport	Event
Gold	Ronnie Delaney	Athletics	Men's 1500 m
Silver	Fred Tiedt	Boxing	Men's Welterweight
Bronze	John Caldwell	Boxing	Men's Flyweight
Bronze	Fred Gilroy	Boxing	Men's Bantamweight
Bronze	Anthony Byrne	Boxing	Men's Lightweight

== Athletics ==
Athlete	Event	Heat		Semifinal		Final	
Athlete	Event	Time	Rank	Time	Rank	Time	Rank
Ron Delany	Men's 1500m	–		3:47.4	3	3:41.2	1st place, gold medalist(s)
Eamonn Kinsella	Men's 110m Hurdles	14.66	4	Did Not Advance			
Maeve Kyle	Women's 100m	12.3	6	Did Not Advance			
Maeve Kyle	Women's 200m	26.4	5	Did Not Advance			

== Boxing ==
Athlete	Event	First Round	Second Round	Quarterfinals	Semifinals	Final	
Athlete	Event	Opposition Result	Opposition Result	Opposition Result	Opposition Result	Opposition Result	Rank
John Caldwell	Flyweight	Bye	Shwe (BIR) W RSC Round 3	Batchelor (AUS) W Points	Dobrescu (ROU) L Points	Did Not Advance	3rd place, bronze medalist(s)
Frederick Gilroy	Bantamweight	Bye	Stepanov (URS) W KO	Mario Sitri (ITA) W Points	Behrendt (EUA) L Points	Did Not Advance	3rd place, bronze medalist(s)
Martin Smyth	Featherweight	Hämäläinen (FIN) L Points	Did Not Advance				
Anthony Byrne	Lightweight	Bye	Chovanec (TCH) W DSQ	Molina (USA) W Points	Kurschat (EUA) W Points	Did Not Advance	3rd place, bronze medalist(s)
Harry Perry	Light Welterweight	Bye	Saluden (FRA) L Points	Did Not Advance			
Fred Tiedt	Welterweight	Walasek (POL) W Points	–	Lane (USA) W Points	Hogarth (AUS) W Points	Linca (ROU) L Points	2nd place, silver medalist(s)
Patrick Sharkley	Heavyweight	Åhsman (SWE) W KO	–	Did Not Advance			

== Wrestling ==
Men's Light-Heavyweight, Freestyle

- Gerry Martina 4th Won against Spyros Defteraios (GRE)
