= 1955 European Amateur Boxing Championships =

Boxing competitions

- Host city: West Berlin
- Nations: 24
- Athletes: 153
- Dates: 27 May–5 June

The 1955 European Amateur Boxing Championships were held in West Berlin, from May 27 to June 5. The 11th edition of the bi-annual competition was organised by the European governing body for amateur boxing, EABA. There were 153 fighters from 24 countries participating (among them Turkey, Egypt and Saara).

== Medal winners ==
Event	Gold	Silver	Bronze
Flyweight (– 51 kilograms)	Edgar Basel; West Germany	Mircea Dobrescu; Romania	Henryk Kukier; Poland Wolfgang Behrendt; East Germany
Bantamweight (– 54 kilograms)	Zenon Stefaniuk; Poland	Boris Stiepanov; Soviet Union	Daniel Hellebuyck; Belgium Wolfgang Schwarz; West Germany
Featherweight (– 57 kilograms)	Tommy Nicholls; England	Alexander Zasukhin; Soviet Union	Pentti Hamalainen; Finland Hans-Peter Mehling; West Germany
Lightweight (– 60 kilograms)	Harry Kurschat; West Germany	Darweesh Mustafa; Egypt	(Socialist Federal Republic of Yugoslavia) Ilija Lukić; Yugoslavia Pentti Rautiainen; Finland
Light Welterweight (– 63.5 kilograms)	Leszek Drogosz; Poland	Pal Budai; Hungary	Vladimir Yengibaryan; Soviet Union Hans Petersen; Denmark
Welterweight (– 67 kilograms)	Nicky Gargano; England	Hippolyte Annex; France	(Socialist Federal Republic of Yugoslavia) Pavle Sovljanski; Yugoslavia Nicolae Linca; Romania
Light Middleweight (– 71 kilograms)	Zbigniew Pietrzykowski; Poland	Karlos Dzhaneryan; Soviet Union	Marcel Pigou; France Rolf Caroli; East Germany
Middleweight (– 75 kilograms)	Gennadi Shatkov; Soviet Union	Stig Sjölin; Sweden	Dieter Wemhöner; West Germany Bedrich Koutny; Czechoslovakia
Light Heavyweight (– 81 kilograms)	Erich Schöppner; West Germany	Ulrich Nitzschke; East Germany	Július Torma; Czechoslovakia Ottavio Panunzi; Italy
Heavyweight (+ 81 kilograms)	Algirdas Šocikas; Soviet Union	Horst Witterstein; West Germany	Horymír Netuka; Czechoslovakia Francis Magnetto; France

== Medal table ==
Rank	Nation	Gold	Silver	Bronze	Total
1	West Germany (FRG)	3	1	3	7
2	Poland (POL)	3	0	1	4
3	Soviet Union (URS)	2	3	1	6
4	England (ENG)	2	0	0	2
5	East Germany (GDR)	0	1	2	3
5	France (FRA)	0	1	2	3
7	Romania (ROU)	0	1	1	2
8	Egypt (EGY)	0	1	0	1
8	Hungary (HUN)	0	1	0	1
8	Sweden (SWE)	0	1	0	1
11	Czechoslovakia (TCH)	0	0	3	3
12	Finland (FIN)	0	0	2	2
12	Yugoslavia (YUG)	0	0	2	2
14	Belgium (BEL)	0	0	1	1
14	Denmark (DEN)	0	0	1	1
14	Italy (ITA)	0	0	1	1
Totals (16 entries)		10	10	20	40
