= Choi Hyun-mi =

South Korean boxer

Choi Hyun-mi 최현미
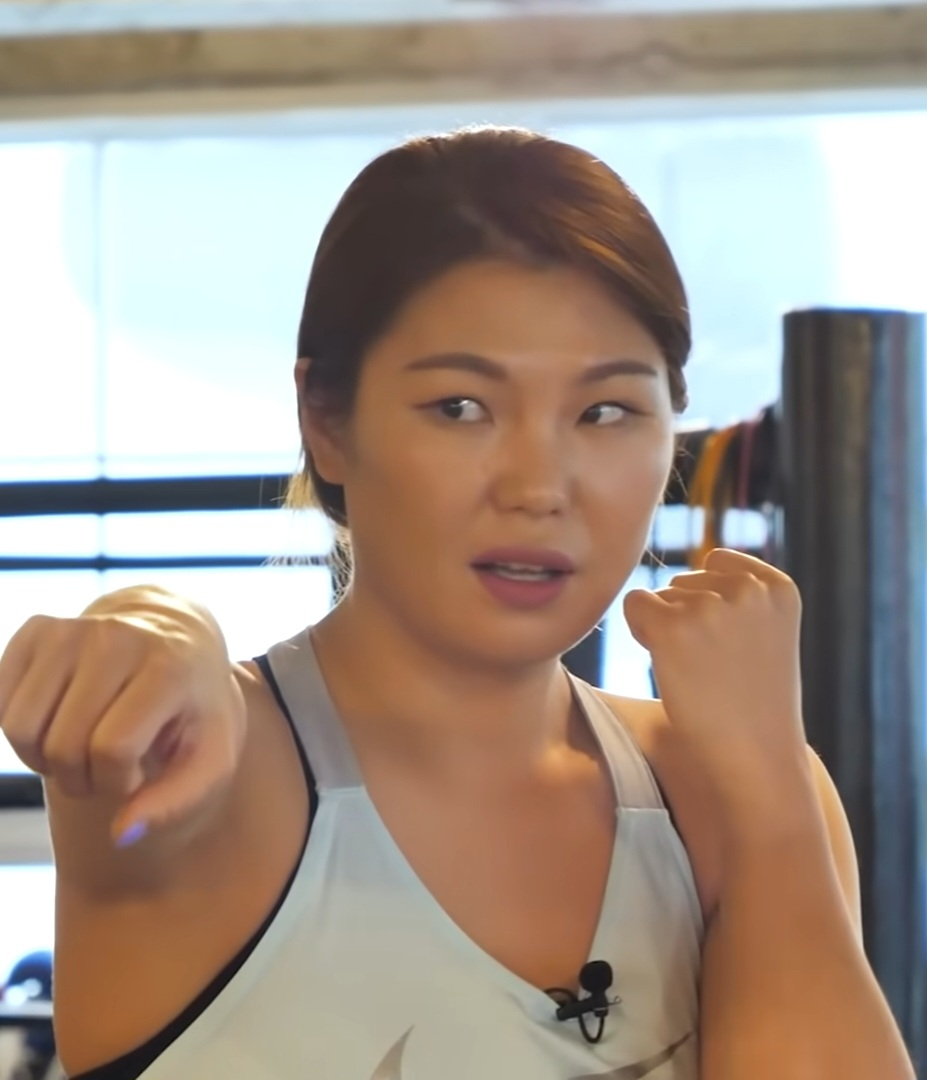
- Choi Hyun-mi boxer

Personal information
- Nickname: Defector Girl Boxer
- Nationality: North Korean (until 2004); South Korean (since 2004)
- Born: November 7, 1990 (age 35) Pyongyang, North Korea
- Height: 5 ft 7 in (170 cm)
- Weight: Featherweight; Super featherweight; Lightweight

Boxing career
- Reach: 65 1/2 in (166 cm)
- Stance: Orthodox

Boxing record
- Total fights: 23
- Wins: 21
- Win by KO: 5
- Losses: 1
- Draws: 1

Choi Hyun-mi (Korean: 최현미; born November 7, 1990) is a South Korean female professional boxer. She is a two-weight world champion, having held the WBA female super-featherweight title from 2013 to 2023 and previously the WBA female featherweight title from 2008 to 2013.

== Biography ==
At age 13, Choi was asked to prepare to compete in the 2008 Olympics as a member of the North Korean team; eventually the International Olympic Committee decided against including women's boxing in the competition. In 2004 her father, a successful businessman in North Korea, fled the country, followed by his family, who traveled first through China, then were smuggled through Vietnam before settling in South Korea, where Choi's promoters advertised her as the "Defector Girl Boxer".

Choi entered the amateur ranks in South Korea in 2006, winning five domestic titles before turning professional. In her pro-debut on October 11, 2008, Choi became the first female and one of only six boxers ever to fight for a world title in their debut. She would join Pete Rademacher, Rafael Lovera, Joko Arter, Joves De La Puz & Arturo Mayan in accomplishing this feat and the first to actually win it. She would do this by beating Xu Chunyan of China to win vacant WBA featherweight title.

Choi won the vacant interim WBA female super-flyweight title thanks to a unanimous decision win over Emiko Raika from Japan on 15 August 2013. She was subsequently upgraded to full champion status.

She won the vacant WBF female super-featherweight World title on 21 May 2016, defeating South Africa's Unathi Myekeni by unanimous decision.

In December 2023, the WBA made Choi "Champion in Recess" after she filed a medical exemption and was ruled unfit to defend her title by the sanctioning body’s annual convention in Orlando, Florida, USA.

After 22 fights unbeaten spanning almost 16 years, Choi suffered the first defeat of her professional boxing career on 27 April 2024, losing to Canada's Jessica Camara by split decision in a contest for the vacant WBA female lightweight Gold title at Ajou University, Suwon, South Korea.

== Professional boxing record ==
23 fights	21 wins	1 loss
By knockout	5	0
By decision	16	1
Draws	1	

No.	Result	Record	Opponent	Type	Round, time	Date	Location	Notes
23	Loss	21–1–1	Jessica Camara	SD	10	Apr 27, 2024	Ajou University Suwon, South Korea	For vacant WBA Gold lightweight title
22	Win	21–0–1	María Maderna	UD	10	Jul 15, 2023	Suwon Gymnasium, Suwon, South Korea	
21	Win	20–0–1	Vanessa Bradford	UD	10	Oct 19, 2022	SK Olympic Handball Gymnasium, Seoul, South Korea	Retained WBA female super-featherweight title
20	Win	19–0–1	Simone Aparecida da Silva	KO	9 (10), 1:15	Sep 18, 2021	Dongducheon Sports Center, Dongducheon, South Korea	Retained WBA female super-featherweight title
19	Win	18–0–1	Calista Salgado	UD	10	Dec 18, 2020	Seminole Hard Rock Hotel & Casino, Hollywood, Florida, U.S.	Retained WBA female super-featherweight title
18	Win	17–0–1	Wakako Fujiwara	UD	10	Jun 29, 2019	East Incheon middle school, Incheon, South Korea	Retained WBA female super-featherweight title
17	Win	16–0–1	Mayra Alejandra Gomez	UD	10	Jul 15, 2018	Prince Hotel, Daegu, South Korea	Retained WBA female super-featherweight title
16	Win	15–0–1	Jessica Gonzalez	TD	6 (10), 1:05	Nov 18, 2017	Seoun Park Tennis Gymnasium, Incheon, South Korea	Retained WBA female super-featherweight title
15	Win	14–0–1	Kimika Miyoshi	UD	10	Apr 15, 2017	Siheung Gymnasium, Siheung, South Korea	Retained WBA female super-featherweight title
14	Win	13–0–1	Unathi Myekeni	UD	10	May 21, 2016	Pearl Gymnasium, Jinju, South Korea	Won vacant WBF female super-featherweight title
13	Win	12–0–1	Diana Ayala	UD	10	Mar 27, 2016	Gwangmyeong Cave, Gwangmyeong, South Korea	Retained WBA female super-featherweight title
12	Win	11–0–1	Siriwan Thongmanit	KO	3 (10)	Dec 6, 2015	Seogu Public Sports Center, Daegu, South Korea	
11	Win	10–0–1	Chika Mizutani	UD	10	May 23, 2015	Mungyeong Gymnasium, Mungyeong, South Korea	Retained WBA female super-featherweight title
10	Win	9–0–1	Keanpetch Superchamps	TKO	8 (10), 1:19	May 10, 2014	SeoulTech, Seoul, South Korea	Retained WBA female super-featherweight title
9	Win	8–0–1	Emiko Raika	UD	10	Aug 15, 2013	Wolmido, South Korea	Won Interim WBA female super-featherweight title
8	Win	7–0–1	Shannon O'Connell	UD	10	May 5, 2013	KBS Sports World, Seoul, South Korea	Retained WBA female featherweight title
7	Win	6–0–1	Rocio Castillo	UD	10	May 4, 2012	KBS Sports World, Seoul, South Korea	Retained WBA female featherweight title
6	Win	5–0–1	Sainumdoi Superchamps	TKO	5 (10), 1:19	Dec 17, 2011	SeoulTech, Seoul, South Korea	Retained WBA female featherweight title
5	Win	4–0–1	Sandy Tsagouris	KO	3 (10), 1:39	Apr 29, 2011	Chungeui Temple, Yesan Gun, South Korea	Retained WBA female featherweight title
4	Win	3–0–1	Claudia Andrea López	SD	10	Apr 30, 2010	Sungkyunkwan University, Suwon, South Korea	Retained WBA female featherweight title
3	Win	2–0–1	Tenku Tsubasa	UD	10	Nov 21, 2009	Sungkyunkwan University, Suwon, South Korea	Retained WBA female featherweight title
2	Draw	1–0–1	Kim Hyo-min	SD	10	May 30, 2009	SeoulTech, Seoul, South Korea	Retained WBA female featherweight title
1	Win	1–0	Xu Chunyan	UD	10	Oct 11, 2008	Gymnasium, Jinan Gun, South Korea	Won vacant WBA female featherweight title

== See also ==
- List of female boxers
- List of Korean boxers

Sporting positions
Minor world boxing titles
Vacant Title last held by Ramona Kühne	WBF super-featherweight champion May 21, 2016 – 2017; Vacated	Vacant Title next held by Stephanie Ducastel
Major world boxing titles
Vacant Title last held by Hwa Won Lee	WBA featherweight champion October 11, 2008 – 2013; Vacated	Succeeded by Ogleidis Suárez; Interim champion promoted
New title	WBA super-featherweight champion Interim title August 15, 2013 – October 30, 2013; Promoted	Vacant Title next held by Elif Nur Turhan
Preceded by Kina Malpartida; Retired	WBA super-featherweight champion October 30, 2013 – December 24, 2022; Status changed	Vacant Title next held by Alycia Baumgardner
Honorary boxing titles
New title	WBA super-featherweight champion In recess December 24, 2022 – 2023; Vacated	Vacant
