= Boxing at the 1956 Summer Olympics – Bantamweight =

Olympic boxing tournament

Bantamweight boxing at the Games of the XVI Olympiad
- Venue: West Melbourne Stadium
- Dates: 23 November – 1 December 1956
- Competitors: 18 from 18 nations

Medalists
1st place, gold medalist(s)		Wolfgang Behrendt	United Team of Germany
2nd place, silver medalist(s)		Song Soon-Chun	South Korea
3rd place, bronze medalist(s)		Claudio Barrientos	Chile
3rd place, bronze medalist(s)		Frederick Gilroy	Ireland

The men's bantamweight event was part of the boxing programme at the 1956 Summer Olympics. The weight class was allowed boxers of up to 54 kilograms to compete. The competition was held from 23 November to 1 December 1956. 18 boxers from 18 nations competed.

== Medalists ==
Gold	Wolfgang Behrendt; United Team of Germany
Silver	Song Soon-Chun; South Korea
Bronze	Claudio Barrientos; Chile
Bronze	Frederick Gilroy; Ireland

== Results ==
=== First round ===
- Song Soon-Chun (KOR) def. Alberto Adela (PHI), PTS
- Robert Bath (AUS) def. Henry Jayasuriya (CEY), PTS

=== Second round ===
- Frederick Gilroy (IRL) def. Boris Stepanov (URS), KO-3
- Mario Sitri (ITA) def. Ahmed Rashid (PAK), PTS
- Owen Reilly (GBR) def. Daniel Hellebuyck (BEL), PTS
- Wolfgang Behrendt (GER) def. Henrik Ottesen (DEN), RTD-2
- Claudio Barrientos (CHI) def. Zenon Stefaniuk (POL), PTS
- Eder Jofre (BRA) def. Thein Myint (BUR), PTS
- Carmelo Tomaselli (ARG) def. Vichai Limcharoen (THA), PTS
- Song Soon-Chun (KOR) def. Robert Bath (AUS), PTS

=== Quarterfinals ===
- Frederick Gilroy (IRL) def. Mario Sitri (ITA), PTS
- Wolfgang Behrendt (GER) def. Owen Reilly (GBR), PTS
- Claudio Barrientos (CHI) def. Eder Jofre (BRA), PTS
- Song Soon-Chun (KOR) def. Carmelo Tomaselli (ARG), PTS

=== Semifinals ===
- Wolfgang Behrendt (GER) def. Frederick Gilroy (IRL), PTS
- Song Soon-Chun (KOR) def. Claudio Barrientos (CHI), PTS

=== Final ===
- Wolfgang Behrendt (GER) def. Song Soon-Chun (KOR), PTS
