= Boxing at the 1956 Summer Olympics – Light welterweight =

Olympic boxing tournament

Light welterweight boxing at the Games of the XVI Olympiad
- Venue: West Melbourne Stadium
- Dates: 24 November – 1 December 1956
- Competitors: 22 from 22 nations

Medalists
1st place, gold medalist(s)		Vladimir Yengibaryan	Soviet Union
2nd place, silver medalist(s)		Franco Nenci	Italy
3rd place, bronze medalist(s)		Constantin Dumitrescu	Romania
3rd place, bronze medalist(s)		Henry Loubscher	South Africa

The men's light welterweight event was part of the boxing programme at the 1956 Summer Olympics. The weight class was allowed boxers of up to 63.5 kilograms to compete. The competition was held from 24 November to 1 December 1956. 22 boxers from 22 nations competed.

== Medalists ==
Gold	Vladimir Yengibaryan; Soviet Union
Silver	Franco Nenci; Italy
Bronze	Constantin Dumitrescu; Romania
Bronze	Henry Loubscher; South Africa

== Results ==
=== First round ===
- Constantin Dumitrescu (ROU) def. Terrence Oung (BUR), PTS
- Hans Pedersen (DEN) def. Carlos Rodríguez (VEN), PTS
- Antonio Marcilla (ARG) def. Chune Pattapong (THA), RSC-1
- Leopold Potesil (AUT) def. Celestino Pinto (BRA), PTS
- Franco Nenci (ITA) def. Gul Rehmat (PAK), RSC-3
- Willi Roth (FRG) def. Thomas Schuster (FIJ), PTS

=== Second round ===
- Claude Saluden (FRA) def. Harry Perry (IRL), PTS
- Vladimir Yengibaryan (URS) def. Leszek Drogosz (POL), PTS
- Henry Loubscher (RSA) def. Leslie Mason (CAN), PTS
- Joseph Shaw (USA) def. Max Carlos (AUS), PTS
- Hwang Ui-gyeong (KOR) def. Manuel de los Santos (PHI), DSQ-2
- Constantin Dumitrescu (ROU) def. Hans Pedersen (DEN), PTS
- Antonio Marcilla (ARG) def. Leopold Potesil (AUT), PTS
- Franco Nenci (ITA) def. Willi Roth (FRG), PTS

=== Quarterfinals ===
- Vladimir Yengibaryan (URS) def. Claude Saluden (FRA), PTS
- Henry Loubscher (RSA) def. Joseph Shaw (USA), PTS
- Constantin Dumitrescu (ROU) def. Hwang Ei-Kyung (KOR), PTS
- Franco Nenci (ITA) def. Antonio Marcilla (ARG), PTS

=== Semifinals ===
- Vladimir Yengibaryan (URS) def. Henry Loubscher (RSA), PTS
- Franco Nenci (ITA) def. Constantin Dumitrescu (ROU), PTS

=== Final ===
- Vladimir Yengibaryan (URS) def. Franco Nenci (ITA), PTS
