= 1953 European Amateur Boxing Championships =

Boxing competitions

- Host city: Warsaw
- Country: Poland
- Nations: 19
- Athletes: 117
- Dates: 17–24 May

The 1953 European Amateur Boxing Championships were held in Warsaw, Poland from May 17 to May 24. The tenth edition of the bi-annual competition was organised by the European governing body for amateur boxing, EABA. There were 117 fighters from 19 countries participating.

== Medal winners ==
Games	Gold	Silver	Bronze
Flyweight (– 51 kilograms)	Henryk Kukier; Poland	František Majdloch; Czechoslovakia	Giacomo Spano; Italy Anatoli Bulakov; Soviet Union
Bantamweight (– 54 kilograms)	Zenon Stefaniuk; Poland	Boris Stepanov; Soviet Union	(Republic of Ireland) John McNally; Ireland Nicolae Mindreanu; Romania
Featherweight (– 57 kilograms)	Józef Kruża; Poland	Aleksander Zasukhin; Soviet Union	Hans-Peter Mehling; West Germany (Socialist Federal Republic of Yugoslavia) Stevan Redli; Yugoslavia
Lightweight (– 60 kilograms)	Vladimir Yengibaryan; Soviet Union	István Juhász; Hungary	Aleksy Antkiewicz; Poland Pentti Niinivuori; Finland
Light Welterweight (– 63.5 kilograms)	Leszek Drogosz; Poland	(Republic of Ireland) Terence Milligan; Ireland	Francisc Ambrus; Romania Béla Szakács; Hungary
Welterweight (– 67 kilograms)	Zygmunt Chychła; Poland	Sergei Scherbakov; Soviet Union	Nicolae Linca; Romania Emile Vleminck; Belgium
Light Middleweight (– 71 kilograms)	Bruce Wells; England	Max Resch; West Germany	Zbigniew Pietrzykowski; Poland Boris Tishin; Soviet Union
Middleweight (– 75 kilograms)	Dieter Wemhöner; West Germany	Bedřich Koutný; Czechoslovakia	Stig Sjölin; Sweden Ronald Barton; England
Light Heavyweight (– 81 kilograms)	Ulrich Nitzschke; East Germany	Tadeusz Grzelak; Poland	Yuri Yegorov; Soviet Union Helmut Pfirrmann; West Germany
Heavyweight (+ 81 kilograms)	Algirdas Šocikas; Soviet Union	Bogdan Węgrzyniak; Poland	(Socialist Federal Republic of Yugoslavia) Tomislav Krizmanić; Yugoslavia Hermann Schreibauer; West Germany

== Medal table ==
Rank	Nation	Gold	Silver	Bronze	Total
1	Poland (POL)	5	2	2	9
2	Soviet Union (URS)	2	3	3	8
3	West Germany (FRG)	1	1	3	5
4	England (ENG)	1	0	1	2
5	East Germany (GDR)	1	0	0	1
6	Czechoslovakia (TCH)	0	2	0	2
7	Hungary (HUN)	0	1	1	2
7	Ireland (IRL)	0	1	1	2
9	Romania (ROU)	0	0	3	3
10	Yugoslavia (YUG)	0	0	2	2
11	Belgium (BEL)	0	0	1	1
11	Finland (FIN)	0	0	1	1
11	Italy (ITA)	0	0	1	1
11	Sweden (SWE)	0	0	1	1
Totals (14 entries)		10	10	20	40
