= Boxing at the 1956 Summer Olympics – Lightweight =

Olympic boxing tournament

Lightweight boxing at the Games of the XVI Olympiad
- Venue: West Melbourne Stadium
- Dates: 23 November – 1 December 1956
- Competitors: 18 from 18 nations

Medalists
1st place, gold medalist(s)		Richard McTaggart	Great Britain
2nd place, silver medalist(s)		Harry Kurschat	United Team of Germany
3rd place, bronze medalist(s)		Anatoly Lagetko	Soviet Union
3rd place, bronze medalist(s)		Anthony Byrne	Ireland

The men's lightweight event was part of the boxing programme at the 1956 Summer Olympics. The weight class was allowed boxers of up to 60 kilograms to compete. The competition was held from 23 November to 1 December 1956. 18 boxers from 18 nations competed.

== Medalists ==
Gold	Richard McTaggart; Great Britain
Silver	Harry Kurschat; United Team of Germany
Bronze	Anatoly Lagetko; Soviet Union
Bronze	Anthony Byrne; Ireland

== Results ==
=== First round ===
- Toshihito Ishimaru (JPN) def. Paddy Donovan (NZL), PTS
- Anatoly Lagetko (URS) def. Francisco Nuñez (ARG), PTS

=== Second round ===
- Zygmunt Milewski (POL) def. Pentti Niinivuori (FIN), PTS
- Harry Kurschat (FRG) def. Celedonio Espinosa (PHI), PTS
- Luis Molina (USA) def. William Griffiths (AUS), PTS
- Anthony Byrne (IRL) def. Josef Chovanec (TCH), DSQ-3
- André Vairolatto (FRA) def. Baek Do-seon (KOR), RTD-2
- Richard McTaggart (GBR) def. Chandrasena Jayasuriya (CEY), PTS
- Edward Beattie (CAN) def. Sueb Chundakowsolaya (THA), PTS
- Anatoly Lagetko (URS) def. Toshihito Ishimaru (JPN), PTS

=== Quarterfinals ===
- Harry Kurschat (FRG) def. Zygmunt Milewski (POL), RSC-3
- Anthony Byrne (IRL) def. Luis Molina (USA), PTS
- Richard McTaggart (GBR) def. Andre Vairolatto (FRA), PTS
- Anatoly Lagetko (URS) def. Edward Beattie (CAN), PTS

=== Semifinals ===
- Harry Kurschat (FRG) def. Anthony Byrne (IRL), PTS
- Richard McTaggart (GBR) def. Anatoly Lagetko (URS), PTS

=== Final ===
- Richard McTaggart (GBR) def. Harry Kurschat (FRG), PTS
