= Zasukhin =

Zasukhin (from Russian: засуха, drought) is a Russian male surname, its feminine counterpart is Zasukhina. Notable people with the surname include:

- Aleksandr Zasukhin (1928–2012), Soviet Olympic boxer
- Aleksei Zasukhin (1937–1996), Soviet boxer
