= Fred Tiedt =

Irish boxer

Personal information
- Full name: Frederick Tiedt
- Born: 16 October 1935 Dublin, Ireland
- Died: 15 June 1999 (aged 63) Dublin, Ireland
Medal record
Men's boxing
Representing Ireland
Olympic Games
Silver medal – second place	1956 Melbourne	Welterweight
European Amateur Championships
Bronze medal – third place	1957 Prague	Welterweight

Frederick Tiedt (16 October 1935 – 15 June 1999, born in Dublin, Ireland) was an amateur and professional boxer.

== Amateur career ==
Tiedt won a silver medal for Ireland at the 1956 Summer Olympics in Melbourne, Australia in the welterweight division. Tiedt beat opponents from Poland, the United States, and Australia before losing a split decision to Nicolae Linca of Romania. The following year Tiedt won a bronze medal at the European Amateur Boxing Championships in Prague.

=== Olympic results ===
- Defeated Tadeusz Walasek (Poland) points
- Defeated Pearce Allen Lane (United States) points
- Defeated Kevin Hogarth (Australia) points
- Lost to Nicolae Linca (Romania) points

== Pro career ==
He turned professional in 1959 but his professional career was not as successful as his amateur career with a points victory over Al Sharpe to gain the Irish Welterweight Title the only highlight. Tiedt finished with a record of 12 wins, 7 defeats and 2 ties.

== Notable relative(s) ==
Tiedt is the uncle of Liam Mooney, a former rugby player and now an entrepreneur living in Dubai.

== See also ==
- Ireland at the 1956 Summer Olympics
- Boxing at the 1956 Summer Olympics
