= Boxing at the 1956 Summer Olympics – Welterweight =

Olympic boxing tournament

Welterweight boxing at the Games of the XVI Olympiad
- Venue: West Melbourne Stadium
- Dates: 24 November – 1 December 1956
- Competitors: 16 from 16 nations

Medalists
1st place, gold medalist(s)		Nicolae Linca	Romania
2nd place, silver medalist(s)		Fred Tiedt	Ireland
3rd place, bronze medalist(s)		Kevin Hogarth	Australia
3rd place, bronze medalist(s)		Nicholas Gargano	Great Britain

The men's welterweight event was part of the boxing programme at the 1956 Summer Olympics. The weight class was allowed boxers of up to 67 kilograms to compete. The competition was held from 24 November to 1 December 1956. 16 boxers from 16 nations competed.

== Medalists ==
Gold	Nicolae Linca; Romania
Silver	Fred Tiedt; Ireland
Bronze	Kevin Hogarth; Australia
Bronze	Nicholas Gargano; Great Britain

== Results ==
=== First round ===
- András Dőri (HUN) def. Bait Husain (PAK), PTS
- Kevin Hogarth (AUS) def. Graham Finlay (NZL), PTS
- Pearce Lane (USA) def. Enrique Tovar (VEN), PTS
- Fred Tiedt (IRL) def. Tadeusz Walasek (POL), PTS
- Nicholas André (RSA) def. Lee Shih-chuan (TPE), PTS
- Nicolae Linca (ROU) def. Hector Hatch (FIJ), PTS
- Francisco Gelaberti (ARG) def. Walter Kozak (CAN), PTS
- Nicholas Gargano (GBR) def. Eduard Borisov (URS), PTS

=== Quarterfinals ===
- Kevin Hogarth (AUS) def. András Dori (HUN), PTS
- Fred Tiedt (IRL) def. Pearce Allen Lane (USA), PTS
- Nicolae Linca (ROU) def. Nicholas Andre (RSA), PTS
- Nicholas Gargano (GBR) def. Francisco Gelabert (ARG), PTS

=== Semifinals ===
- Fred Tiedt (IRL) def. Kevin Hogarth (AUS), PTS
- Nicolae Linca (ROU) def. Nicholas Gargano (GBR), PTS

=== Final ===
- Nicolae Linca (ROU) def. Fred Tiedt (IRL), PTS

Tiedt actually received more total points than Linca, but three of the five judges judged him the winner.
