= Boxing at the 1956 Summer Olympics =

Boxing at the Games of the XVI Olympiad
- Dates: 23 November-1 December 1956
- Competitors: 164 from 35 nations

Boxing at the 1956 Summer Olympics took place at the West Melbourne Stadium. A total number of 164 competitors entered from 35 nations, of whom 161 from 34 nations weighed-in and boxing was held eight nights and five afternoons. The boxing schedule began on 23 November and ended on 1 December. Ten boxing events (all men's individual) were contested.

== Medal summary ==
Games	Gold	Silver	Bronze
Flyweight (−51 kg)	Terence Spinks; Great Britain	Mircea Dobrescu; Romania	John Caldwell; Ireland
Flyweight (−51 kg)	Terence Spinks; Great Britain	Mircea Dobrescu; Romania	René Libeer; France
Bantamweight (−54 kg)	Wolfgang Behrendt; United Team of Germany	Song Soon-Chun; South Korea	Claudio Barrientos; Chile
Bantamweight (−54 kg)	Wolfgang Behrendt; United Team of Germany	Song Soon-Chun; South Korea	Frederick Gilroy; Ireland
Featherweight (−57 kg)	Vladimir Safronov; Soviet Union	Thomas Nicholls; Great Britain	Henryk Niedźwiedzki; Poland
Featherweight (−57 kg)	Vladimir Safronov; Soviet Union	Thomas Nicholls; Great Britain	Pentti Hämäläinen; Finland
Lightweight (−60 kg)	Richard McTaggart; Great Britain	Harry Kurschat; United Team of Germany	Anatoly Lagetko; Soviet Union
Lightweight (−60 kg)	Richard McTaggart; Great Britain	Harry Kurschat; United Team of Germany	Anthony Byrne; Ireland
Light welterweight (−63.5 kg)	Vladimir Yengibaryan; Soviet Union	Franco Nenci; Italy	Constantin Dumitrescu; Romania
Light welterweight (−63.5 kg)	Vladimir Yengibaryan; Soviet Union	Franco Nenci; Italy	Henry Loubscher; South Africa
Welterweight (−67 kg)	Nicolae Linca; Romania	Fred Tiedt; Ireland	Kevin Hogarth; Australia
Welterweight (−67 kg)	Nicolae Linca; Romania	Fred Tiedt; Ireland	Nicholas Gargano; Great Britain
Light middleweight (−71 kg)	László Papp; Hungary	José Torres; United States	John McCormack; Great Britain
Light middleweight (−71 kg)	László Papp; Hungary	José Torres; United States	Zbigniew Pietrzykowski; Poland
Middleweight (−75 kg)	Gennadi Schatkov; Soviet Union	Ramón Tapia; Chile	Gilbert Chapron; France
Middleweight (−75 kg)	Gennadi Schatkov; Soviet Union	Ramón Tapia; Chile	Victor Zalazar; Argentina
Light heavyweight (−81 kg)	James Boyd; United States	Gheorghe Negrea; Romania	Carlos Lucas; Chile
Light heavyweight (−81 kg)	James Boyd; United States	Gheorghe Negrea; Romania	Romualdas Murauskas; Soviet Union
Heavyweight (+81 kg)	Pete Rademacher; United States	Lev Mukhin; Soviet Union	Daniel Bekker; South Africa
Heavyweight (+81 kg)	Pete Rademacher; United States	Lev Mukhin; Soviet Union	Giacomo Bozzano; Italy

== Medal table ==
Rank	Nation	Gold	Silver	Bronze	Total
1	Soviet Union	3	1	2	6
2	Great Britain	2	1	2	5
3	United States	2	1	0	3
4	Romania	1	2	1	4
5	United Team of Germany	1	1	0	2
6	Hungary	1	0	0	1
7	Ireland	0	1	3	4
8	Chile	0	1	2	3
9	Italy	0	1	1	2
10	South Korea	0	1	0	1
11	France	0	0	2	2
11	Poland	0	0	2	2
11	South Africa	0	0	2	2
14	Argentina	0	0	1	1
14	Australia	0	0	1	1
14	Finland	0	0	1	1
Totals (16 entries)		10	10	20	40

== Participating nations ==
- Argentina (10)
- Australia (9)
- Austria (1)
- Belgium (1)
- Brazil (2)
- Bulgaria (2)
- Burma (4)
- Canada (6)
- Ceylon (2)
- Chile (3)
- Chinese Taipei (1)
- Czechoslovakia (5)
- Denmark (3)
- Fiji (2)
- Finland (3)
- France (6)
- United Team of Germany (8)
- Great Britain (7)
- Hungary (2)
- Ireland (7)
- Italy (8)
- Japan (3)
- South Korea (5)
- New Zealand (2)
- Pakistan (6)
- Philippines (5)
- Poland (9)
- Romania (4)
- South Africa (7)
- Soviet Union (10)
- Sweden (3)
- Thailand (5)
- United States (8)
- Venezuela (2)
