= Boxing at the 1956 Summer Olympics – Heavyweight =

Olympic boxing tournament

Heavyweight boxing at the Games of the XVI Olympiad
- Venue: West Melbourne Stadium
- Dates: 24 November – 1 December 1956
- Competitors: 11 from 11 nations

Medalists
1st place, gold medalist(s)		Pete Rademacher	United States
2nd place, silver medalist(s)		Lev Mukhin	Soviet Union
3rd place, bronze medalist(s)		Daniel Bekker	South Africa
3rd place, bronze medalist(s)		Giacomo Bozzano	Italy

The men's heavyweight event was part of the boxing programme at the 1956 Summer Olympics. The weight class was allowed boxers of more than 81 kilograms to compete. The competition was held from 24 November to 1 December 1956. 11 boxers from 11 nations competed.

== Medalists ==
Gold	Pete Rademacher; United States
Silver	Lev Mukhin; Soviet Union
Bronze	Daniel Bekker; South Africa
Bronze	Giacomo Bozzano; Italy

== Results ==
=== First round ===
- Giacomo Bozzano (ITA) def. Ilkka Koski (FIN), PTS
- Törner Åhsman (SWE) def. Patrick Sharkey (IRL), KO-3
- Lev Mukhin (URS) def. Bozhil Lozanov (BUL), KO-3

=== Quarterfinals ===
- Daniel Bekker (RSA) def. José Giorgetti (ARG), KO-1
- Pete Rademacher (USA) def. Josef Němec (CZE), KO-2
- Giacomo Bozzano (ITA) def. Ulrich Nitzschke (GER), PTS
- Lev Mukhin (URS) def. Törner Åhsman (SWE), KO-1

=== Semifinals ===
- Pete Rademacher (USA) def. Daniel Bekker (RSA), KO-3
- Lev Mukhin (URS) def. Giacomo Bozzano (ITA), KO-3

=== Final ===
- Pete Rademacher (USA) def. Lev Mukhin (URS), KO-1
