= Franco Nenci =

Italian boxer (1935–2020)

Olympic medal record

Men's Boxing
| Silver medal – second place | 1956 Melbourne | Light Welterweight |

Franco Nenci (27 January 1935 – 15 May 2020) was an Italian welterweight boxer. Nenci represented Italy at the 1956 Melbourne Olympic Games, winning a silver medal as a Light Welterweight.

== Olympic results ==
- Round of 32: Defeated Rehmat Gul (Pakistan) KO 3
- Round of 16: Defeated Willi Roth (United Team of Germany) points
- Quarterfinal: Defeated Antonio Marcilla (Argentina) points
- Semifinal: Defeated Constantin Dumitrescu (Romania) points
- Final: Lost to Vladimir Yengibaryan (Soviet Union) points (was awarded silver medal)
