= Patrick Sharkey (boxer) =

Irish boxer

Pa Sharkey (1931 – 31 October 2016) was a member of the 1956 Irish Olympic boxing team, competing in the heavyweight division. He was eliminated in his 1st round fight - knock-out in the 3rd round - by the Swedish competitor Törner Åhsman.

== See also ==
- Boxing at the 1956 Summer Olympics
