= Carl Fitzgerald =

Carl Fitzgerald may refer to:

- Carl Fitzgerald (Canadian football)
- Carl Fitzgerald (boxer)
