= Graham Finlay =

New Zealand boxer, and rugby league footballer

Personal information
- Full name: Graham Paul Finlay
- Born: 3 February 1936 Greymouth, New Zealand
- Died: 29 July 2018 (aged 82)

Sport
- Sport: Boxing
- Weight class: Welterweight

Graham Paul Finlay (3 February 1936 – 29 July 2018) was a New Zealand boxer who won four national amateur boxing championships, and represented his country at the 1956 Summer Olympics and the 1958 British Empire and Commonwealth Games.

== Biography ==
Born in Greymouth on 3 February 1936, Finlay was the son of Jack "Doc" Finlay.

Trained by his father, Graham Finlay won four New Zealand national amateur boxing championship titles: the light welterweight title in 1954; and the welterweight title in consecutive years from 1955 to 1957. He represented New Zealand in the welterweight division at the 1956 Olympics in Melbourne, losing to the eventual bronze medallist, Kevin Hogarth from Australia, on points in his first bout. In the light-welterweight division at the 1958 British Empire and Commonwealth Games in Cardiff, Finlay was eliminated in the first round, defeated by G.R. Smith from Southern Rhodesia. Overall, Finlay's amateur record was 98 fights for seven defeats.

Finlay was also a useful rugby league second rower, playing for the Greymouth Marist club side that won several West Coast titles, as well as the Thacker Shield in 1959 and 1961.

Outside of sport, Finlay operated the Chevron restaurant and milk bar in Greymouth with his brother-in-law, John Morris. In 1985, Finlay relocated to Christchurch, where he worked for the Inland Revenue Department until his retirement.

Finlay died on 29 July 2018.
