= Vichai =

Vichai or Wichai (Thai: วิชัย) is a Thai masculine given name meaning "victory". It is derived from the Pali/Sanskrit word vijaya (विजय), and is cognate with the Indian name Vijay.

People with the name include:

- Vichai (king), ruler of the Kingdom of Lan Xang, 1637–1638
- Vichai Limcharoen, boxer
- Vichai Rachanon, boxer
- Vichai Sanghamkichakul, footballer
- Vichai Srivaddhanaprabha, billionaire businessman
