= Wolfgang Behrendt =

East German boxer (1936–2026)

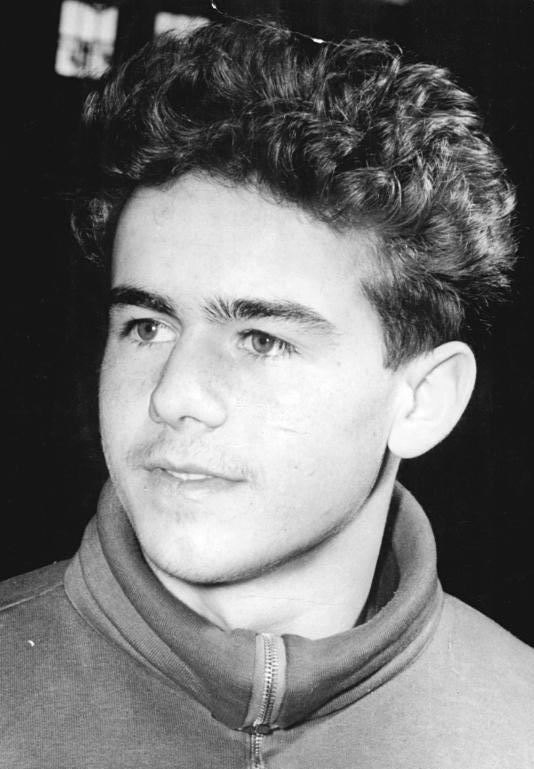
- Behrendt in 1956

Medal record

Representing Germany

Men's boxing
Gold medal – first place	1956 Melbourne	Bantamweight

Wolfgang Behrendt (14 June 1936 – 22 June 2026) was a bantamweight amateur boxer from East Germany, who won the gold medal at the 1956 Summer Olympics for the United Team of Germany. He subsequently became the first Olympic champion for East Germany.

== Biography ==
Behrendt was born in Berlin on 14 June 1936.

He won the gold medal at the 1956 Summer Olympics and became the first Olympic champion for East Germany.

After his boxing career, Behrendt worked as a sports photographer. He was married and had two sons, one of which, Mario Behrendt, represented East Germany in boxing at the 1980 Summer Olympics. Behrendt outlived his wife, who died in 2016, and both sons, who died in 2022 and 2026, and died on 22 June 2026, eight days after his 90th birthday.

== Amateur highlights ==
Record: 188 Wins – 8 Losses – 5 Draws

- 1955 East German Bantamweight Champion, 3rd place (Flyweight) at European Championships in Berlin.
- 1956 Gold Medalist (Bantamweight) in a unified German team at the 1956 Olympics in Melbourne. Results were:
  - Defeated Henrik Ottesen (Denmark) KO-2
  - Defeated Owen Reilly (Great Britain) PTS
  - Defeated Freddie Gilroy (Ireland) PTS
  - Defeated Song Soon-Chun (South Korea) PTS
- 1957 East German Bantamweight Champion
- 1960 East German Featherweight Champion
