= Tomislav Krizmanić =

Tomislav Krizmanić may refer to:

- Tomislav Krizmanić (boxer) (1929–2005) (1929–2005), Croatian boxer
- Tomislav Krizmanić (footballer) (born 2001), Croatian footballer
