= Edward Beatty =

Edward Beatty may refer to:

- Edward Wentworth Beatty (1877–1943), Canadian lawyer, university chancellor, and businessman
- Ed Beatty (1932–2008), American football player
- Ned Beatty (1937–2021), American actor

== See also ==
- Edward Beattie (born 1934), Canadian boxer
