= Tony Byrne (boxer) =

Irish boxer

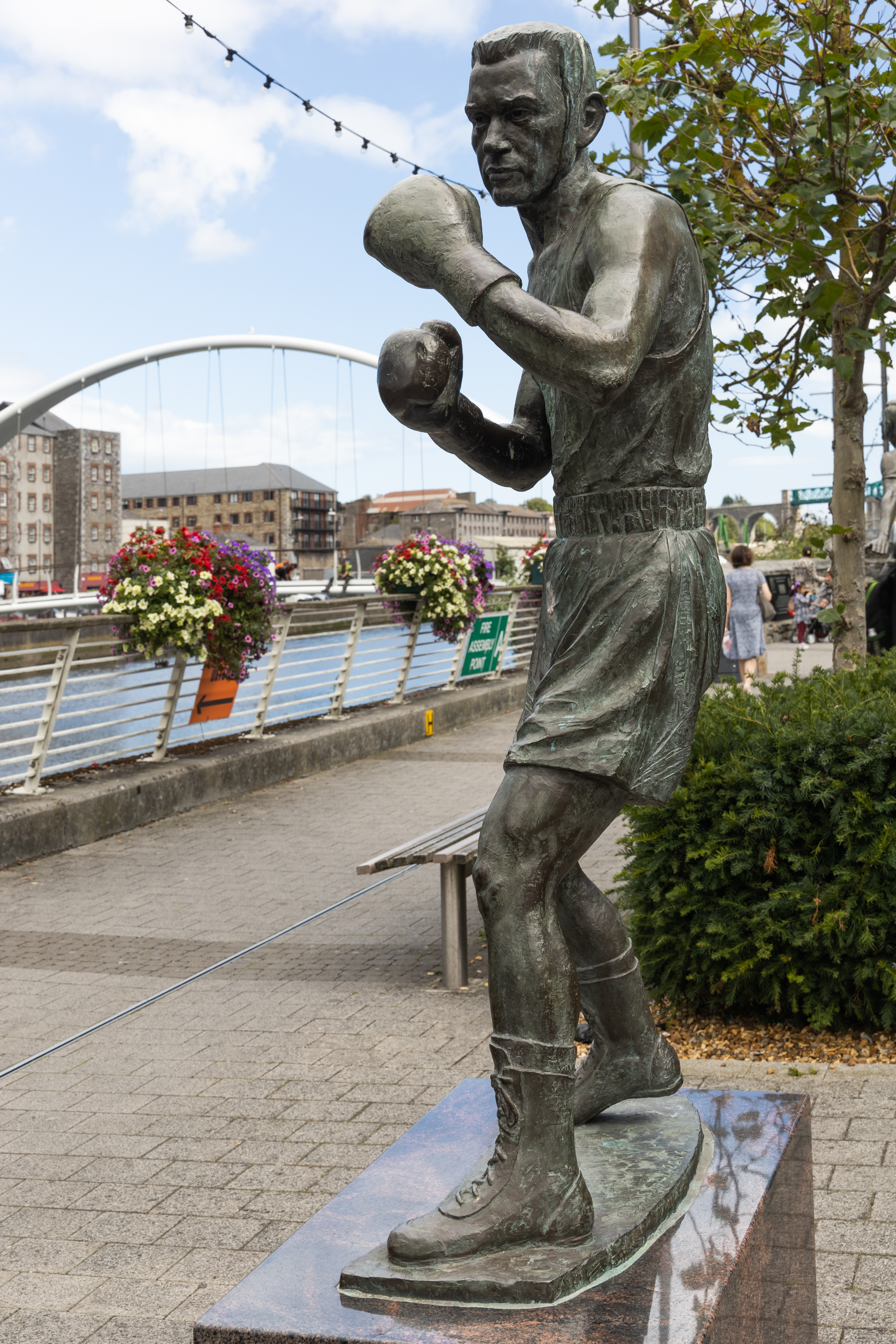
- Statue by Laury Dizangremel in Drogheda

Personal information
- Full name: Anthony Byrne
- Nickname: Socks
- Born: 6 July 1930 Drogheda, Ireland
- Died: 27 April 2013 (aged 82)
Medal record
Men's boxing
Representing Ireland
Olympic Games
Bronze medal – third place	1956 Melbourne	Lightweight

Anthony Byrne (6 July 1930 – 27 April 2013), commonly known as Tony Byrne or Socks Byrne, was an amateur boxer. Byrne won a bronze medal for Ireland at the 1956 Summer Olympics in Melbourne, Australia, in the lightweight division.

== Early life and career ==
Byrne was born in Drogheda, Ireland. Doubt had been cast over whether Byrne would have the funds to travel to Melbourne to participate in the 1956 Olympics. However, a fundraising campaign under the banner of "Send Byrne to Melbourne" was created, and it raised £653 for the purpose from local businesses in Drogheda.

== Melbourne Olympics ==
Byrne carried the flag for Ireland at the opening ceremony and was the captain of the Irish boxing team. He beat opponents from Czechoslovakia and United States before losing in the semifinal on a split decision to Harry Kurschat of Germany. A few months later, he showed what might have been when he beat the eventual Gold Medallist, Dick McTaggart, in an Ireland-England International at the Royal Albert Hall.

=== Olympic results ===
- 1st round bye
- Defeated Josef Chovanec (Czechoslovakia) points
- Defeated Luis Molina (United States) points
- Lost to Harry Kurschat (United Team of Germany) points

== Life after boxing ==
In 1962, Byrne, and his wife Honor, emigrated to Canada. The Byrne's settled in Canada and have a family of two girls and a set of twin boys. In 2006 a statue of Byrne was unveiled in his hometown.

He died on 27 April 2013, aged 82.

== See also ==
- Ireland at the 1956 Summer Olympics
- Boxing at the 1956 Summer Olympics
