= Boxing at the 1952 Summer Olympics – Heavyweight =

Olympic boxing tournament

Heavyweight boxing at the Games of the XV Olympiad
- Venue: Messuhalli
- Dates: 29 July – 2 August 1952
- Competitors: 21 from 21 nations

Medalists
1st place, gold medalist(s)		Ed Sanders	United States
2nd place, silver medalist(s)		Ingemar Johansson	Sweden
3rd place, bronze medalist(s)		Ilkka Koski	Finland
3rd place, bronze medalist(s)		Andries Nieman	South Africa

The men's heavyweight event was part of the boxing programme at the 1952 Summer Olympics. The weight class allowed boxers of more than 81 kilograms to compete. The competition was held from 29 July to 2 August 1952. 21 boxers from 21 nations competed.

== Medalists ==
Gold	Ed Sanders; United States
Silver	Ingemar Johansson; Sweden
Bronze	Ilkka Koski; Finland
Bronze	Andries Nieman; South Africa

== Results ==
Winner	NOC	Result	Loser	NOC
First Round (July 29)
Tomislav Krizmanić	Yugoslavia	3 – 0	Geza Furetz	Romania
Algirdas Šocikas	Soviet Union	TKO 2R	Antoni Gościański	Poland
Andries Nieman	South Africa	3 – 0	Edgar Gorgas	Germany
Ed Sanders	United States	KO 1R	Hans Jost	Switzerland
Jean Lansiaux	France	3 – 0	John Lyttle	Ireland
Edgar Hearn	Great Britain	2 – 1	José Sartor	Argentina
Second Round (July 29)
Giacomo di Segni	Italy	3 – 0	James Saunders	Canada
Horymír Netuka	Czechoslovakia	3 – 0	Carl Fitzgerald	Australia
Ilkka Koski	Finland	KO 2R	László Bene	Hungary
Max Marsille	Belgium	3 – 0	Ahmed El-Minabawi	Egypt
Ingemar Johansson	Sweden	Walkover ^{1}	Luis Amadeo Sosa	Uruguay
Jean Lansiaux	France	Withdrawn ^{2}
New Draw (July 30)
Ingemar Johansson	Sweden	3 – 0	Horymir Netuka	Czechoslovakia
Tomislav Krizmanić	Yugoslavia	3 – 0	Max Maurice Oscar Marsille	Belgium
Third Round (July 31)
Ed Sanders	United States	KO 3R	Giacomo Di Segni	Italy
Andries Nieman	South Africa	KO 1R	Algirdas Šocikas	Soviet Union
Ilkka Koski	Finland	3 – 0	Edgar William Hearn	Great Britain
Ingemar Johansson	Sweden	3 – 0	Tomislav Krizmanić	Yugoslavia
Semi-final (August 1)
Ed Sanders	United States	KO 2R	Andries Nieman	South Africa
Ingemar Johansson	Sweden	2 – 1	Ilkka Koski	Finland
Final (August 2)
Ed Sanders	United States	DSQ 2R	Ingemar Johansson	Sweden

Johansson spent the entire bout backpedalling, without throwing a single punch. After receiving several warnings from the referee, he was finally disqualified for being excessively passive, and was not awarded the silver medal. He eventually received the medal in 1982.

^{1} Sosa did not enter the ring.
^{2} Lansiaux retired from the competition due to injury.
