= Alberto Adela =

Filipino boxer

Personal information
- Nationality: Filipino
- Born: 1934 (age 91–92) Philippines

Sport
- Sport: Boxing

Alberto T. Adela Berting (born 1934) is a Filipino boxer. He competed in the 1956 Summer Olympics.

== 1956 Olympic results ==
Alberto Adela was part of the Filipino boxing contingent that year which also included Federico Bonus, featherweight Paulino Meléndres, Celedonio Espinosa, and Manuel de los Santos. He lost in his first round match (round of 32) to Song Soon-Chun of South Korea on points. The Korean eventually finished second (silver medalist) in the bantamweight division. No Filipino boxer that year won a match in any division.

== Post-Olympic career ==
In 1988, Adela was hired by Gintong Alay to monitor the training of boxers for the 1989 SEA Games.
