= Antoni Gościański =

Polish boxer (1925–1998)

Personal information
- Born: 21 February 1926 Kopanie, Poland
- Died: 25 March 1998 (aged 72) Warsaw, Poland
- Height: 178 cm (5 ft 10 in)
- Weight: 88 kg (194 lb)

Sport
- Country: Poland
- Sport: Boxing

Antoni Gościański (21 February 1926 – 25 March 1998) was a Polish boxer. He competed in the men's heavyweight event at the 1952 Summer Olympics.
