= Nicky Gargano =

English boxer (1934–2016)

Personal information
- Born: 1 November 1934 West Ham, Greater London, England
- Died: 28 March 2016 (aged 81) West Clandon, Surrey, England
Medal record
Men's Boxing
Olympic Games
Representing Great Britain
Bronze medal – third place	1956 Melbourne	Welterweight
Commonwealth Games
Representing England
Gold medal – first place	1954 Vancouver	Welterweight

Nicolo Gargano (1 November 1934 – 28 March 2016) was an English boxer, who won the bronze medal in the welterweight division (– 67 kg) at the 1956 Summer Olympics in Melbourne, Australia. He fought as Nicky Gargano.

== Amateur career ==
Gargano won the 1954, 1955 and 1956 Amateur Boxing Association British welterweight title, when boxing for the Army and later the Covent Gardens ABC.

He represented the English team at the 1954 British Empire and Commonwealth Games held in Vancouver, Canada, where he won the gold medal in the welterweight category.

He died in 2016.

=== Olympic results ===
- Defeated Eduard Borysov (Soviet Union) points
- Defeated Francisco Gelabert (Argentina) points
- Lost to Nicolae Linca (Romania) points
