= Dries Niemann =

South African boxer

Medal record

Men's Boxing

Representing South Africa

Olympic Games
| Bronze medal – third place | 1952 Helsinki | Heavyweight |

Andries Christiaan Niemann (12 August 1927 – 13 August 2009) was a South African boxer, bronze medalist at the 1952 Summer Olympics in Helsinki.
