= Claudio Barrientos =

Chilean boxer (1935–1982)

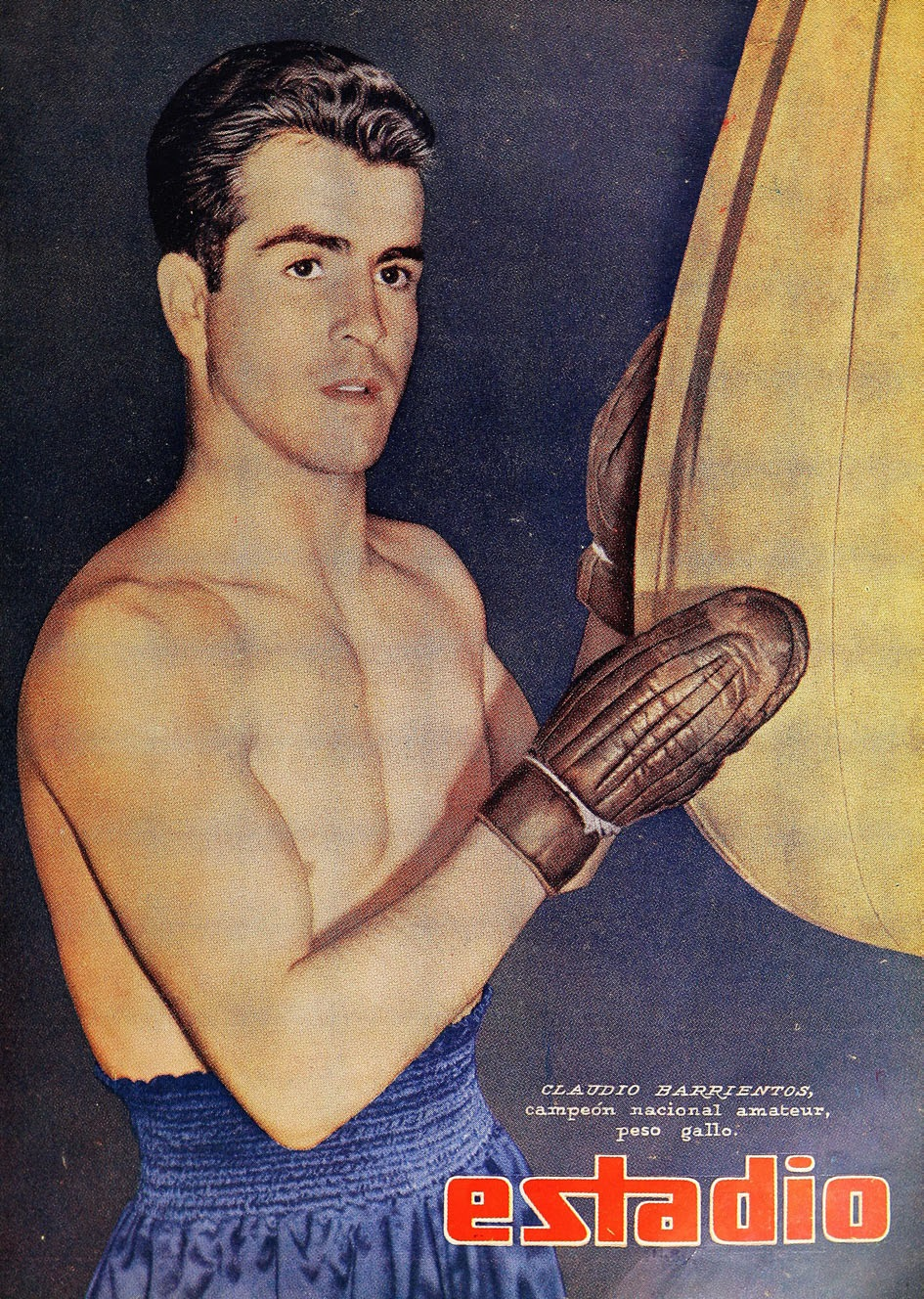
- Barrientos in 1955

Medal record

Men's Boxing

Representing Chile

Olympic Games
Bronze medal – third place	1956 Melbourne	Bantamweight

Pan American Games
Silver medal – second place	Mexico City 1955	Featherweight

Claudio "Tripa" Barrientos (born November 10, 1935, in Osorno — died May 7, 1982) was a Chilean boxer, who won the bronze medal in the bantamweight (119.5 pounds) division at the 1956 Summer Olympics in Melbourne, Australia. A year earlier he won the silver medal at the Pan American Games in the featherweight division. His nickname was Tripa. Barrientos died at age 46.

== Olympic results ==
- 1st round bye
- Defeated Zenon Stefaniuk (Poland) points
- Defeated Eder Jofre (Brazil) points
- Lost to Song Soon-Chun (South Korea) points
