= Ed Sanders (boxer) =

American heavyweight boxer

- Sanders in 1952

Personal information
- Nickname: Big Ed
- Born: Hayes Edward Sanders; March 24, 1930 Watts, Los Angeles, California, U.S.
- Died: December 12, 1954 (aged 24) Boston, Massachusetts, U.S.
- Height: 1.93 m (6 ft 4 in)
- Weight: Heavyweight

Boxing career
- Stance: Orthodox

Boxing record
- Total fights: 9
- Wins: 6
- Win by KO: 3
- Losses: 2
- Draws: 1
Medal record
Representing the United States
Olympic Games
| Gold medal – first place | 1952 Helsinki | Heavyweight |

Hayes Edward "Big Ed" Sanders (March 24, 1930 – December 12, 1954) was an American heavyweight boxer who won an Olympic gold medal in 1952.

== Personal life ==
Sanders was the oldest male child of the family. His older sister, Winifred, died in a scarlet fever epidemic, in 1939. As a child, Sanders was very large for his age and physically strong. At age 12, he was recollected to be the size of a normal 18 year old. Sanders and his younger brother, Donald, collected coffee cans, filled them with cement and connected two of them with a steel bar to make a weight set for exercising. As "Big Ed" grew bigger, faster and stronger, Sanders excelled in football and track and field at Jordan High School.

Outside of the ring, Sanders was known as affable, gentlemanly and highly intelligent.

On 11 December 1954, he faced Willie James for the New England heavyweight title. James knocked out Sanders in the 11th round and Sanders had to be carried from the ring. He never regained consciousness and died 18 hours later.

On May 26, 2012, Sanders' son Russell presided over his posthumous induction into the Compton Community College Athletics Hall of Fame, under the category of boxing. He also was inducted into the Idaho State University Athletic Hall of Fame.

== Early life ==
After graduating from Jordan High School, Sanders attended Compton College, where he again excelled in football and a new sport, boxing. In 1950, at the National Junior College Boxing Championships in Ogden, Utah, the six-foot four-inch, 220 pound Sanders attracted the attention of Idaho State College boxing coach Dubby Holt and football coach Babe Caccia. "He had a good left hand, and for the big man that he was, he was a real orthodox, skilled boxer," Holt recalled. Shortly thereafter, Sanders was awarded an athletic scholarship to Idaho State College (now Idaho State University) in Pocatello, Idaho, where he boxed and played football.

Sanders flourished at nearly all-white Idaho State. In his first collegiate bout, Sanders knocked out the Pacific Coast Heavyweight Champion. Sanders also set a record by never losing a bout in a collegiate dual meet. While attending Idaho State, Sanders fell in love with Pocatellan Mary LaRue, who was then a secretary at Idaho State's athletic department. She later became his wife.

== Amateur career ==
In 1951, Sanders was drafted into the U.S. Army to fight in the Korean War, but was convinced to join the Navy by his coaches. He then continued his boxing career as part of the U.S. Navy Boxing Team under G.E. “Moose” Detty. Sanders scored a string of major victories when he defeated the Navy Heavyweight Champion, Kirby Seals, in San Diego, California, and won both the Los Angeles Golden Gloves and Chicago Golden Gloves Tournaments. He subsequently toured Europe, winning the Golden Gloves Tournament in Berlin, Germany, which enhanced his reputation as a dominant heavyweight. Upon his return to the United States, Sanders trained at Naval facilities in Maryland for his dream—the Olympics.

=== Olympics ===
The Olympics, once a faraway dream, were suddenly within Sanders’ grasp, but the Olympic trials loomed as a major test, as stiff competition from around the country vied for the few coveted U.S. Team spots. In the Mid-West Regional in Omaha, Nebraska, Sanders was defeated by Army Corporal Lloyd Willis, but still advanced to the finals because of his prior victory over Navy Champion Seals. Sanders and Willis met again in a bout in Kansas City, Missouri that decided the last spot on the Olympic boxing team. With a broken hand, Sanders knocked out Willis, dropping him with a smashing left hook in only one minute.

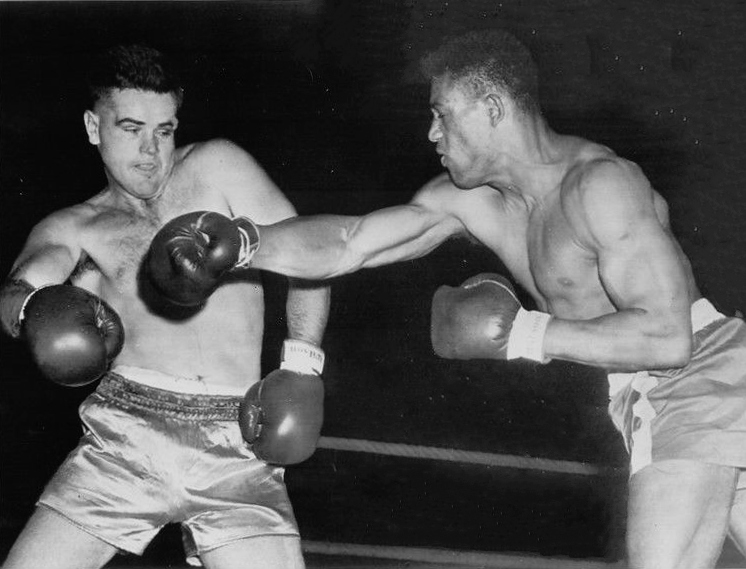
Sanders (right) against Jack Scheberies during the American Olympic Boxing Championships in June 1952

The 1952 Summer Olympics in Helsinki turned out not to be much of a challenge for Sanders, as he knocked out his first three opponents and reached the final against Swede Ingemar Johansson. Their match was unremarkable. For the entire first round, Johansson avoided Sanders by circling along the edges of the ring. The crowd, growing impatient, called for Johansson to fight. In the second round, Johansson continued the same strategy. Finally, in the third minute of the second round, Johansson was disqualified for failure to fight by the referee. Johansson was ushered from the ring between policemen, and was subsequently refused the silver medal. Sanders later stood atop the prize dais with the place for the silver medalist vacant and a Swedish flag in its unfurled knot. Johansson maintained he was not fleeing Sanders, but rather was trying to tire his huge opponent for a planned third round onslaught but he was not awarded his silver medal for another 30 years.

Sanders, the first African American Olympic Heavyweight Champion and the first American to win gold in the division since 1904, returned to the United States a national hero. The combination of his tenacious fighting style, deep sense of assurance and humble demeanor attracted constant media attention. The City of Los Angeles named a day in his honor, and he was inundated with requests for his attendance at athletic, social and religious events.

After the Olympics, Sanders’ amateur status became a burden on his ability to provide for his wife and young son, Russell, who was born in 1953. Sanders’ Naval commitments took him to San Diego, where he trained with mentor and close friend Moose Detty. Sanders was transferred subsequently to Maryland and then Boston, where he rented a flat with his wife and son.

As a Navy man, Sanders was prevented from boxing professionally, so he continued to box in the amateur ranks.

Sanders reentered the 1953 Gold Gloves Tournament and fought future World Heavyweight Champion Sonny Liston in the 1953 Chicago Golden Gloves Championship fight. Sanders entered the fight with a broken thumb, which hampered what was still considered a good performance. Liston emerged victorious, though witnesses at the fight accused Liston of clutching Sanders illegally, and still others in the audience felt Sanders won the fight. Sanders was invited again to the Intercity Golden Gloves Tournament but turned down the opportunity due to the thumb injury.

Sanders ended his amateur career with a record of 43 wins and only 4 losses.

== Professional career ==
After the Olympic victory, Sanders’ pro career became an intriguing prospect, but Sanders was still in the Navy, which did not allow active duty personnel to box professionally. Additionally, Sanders, now living near a Naval base in Boston, lacked a consistent trainer and heavyweight sparring partners. Sanders set out to become Heavyweight Champion.

Sanders turned to many people for advice, including his Navy Captain. Sanders primary confidante was Detty, who in letters cautioned against turning pro. Though Sanders was an Olympic champion, he had only been boxing for 4 years and needed more seasoning before turning pro.

Sanders, famous and holding a prized Olympic gold medal, faced immense pressure to turn pro from the boxing world and media. Sanders also needed to provide financially for his wife, Mary, and infant son, Russell. Sanders tried desperately but failed to obtain a discharge from the Navy, which considered him committed until at least 1955. Still, Sanders lacked experience.

On June 17, 1954, Sanders attended the Rocky Marciano-Ezzard Charles fight in New York as a guest of the International Boxing Council, which courted Sanders heavily. Earlier that same day, Sanders attended a game between the Brooklyn Dodgers and the Boston Braves and witnessed Jackie Robinson hit two home runs.

Sanders turned pro in February 1953, suspiciously acting as his own manager to satisfy Naval requirements. Sanders’ IBC advisors, Truman Gibson, Nuno Cam, Sam Silverman, Frankie Carbo and Johnny Dundee, were all allegedly connected to the boxing underworld - strange bedfellows for a man like Sanders, but perhaps unavoidable for success in boxing in Boston 1953–54.

Sanders’ first pro fight took place on March 8, 1954, against Sonny Nichols, with Sanders winning in a first-round TKO. Sanders won his next two fights by knockout before being stunned in a five-round decision loss to Willie Wilson. In private correspondence to Detty, a shocked and saddened Sanders confided that he felt he lacked adequate trades and sparring partners other than highly regarded local heavyweight Willie James. Sanders also complained about intense shoulder pain, and mentioned in letters that it had been x-rayed.

Sanders won a May 22, 1954, bout against Jack Flood and then avenged his earlier loss to Willie Wilson later that summer in August 1954, winning an eight-round decision. On October 5, 1954, Sanders fought to a draw with Bert Whitehurst. Sanders and Whitehurst fought a rematch only three weeks later on October 26, 1954, with Sanders winning a ten-round unanimous decision. Concluding a turbulent year, Sanders fought eight professional fights within only nine months, losing one fight and drawing (tying) another one in two close decisions.

=== Last fight and death ===
On Saturday, December 11, 1954, Sanders fought his sparring partner Willie James, the New England Heavyweight Champion at Boston Garden in Boston, Massachusetts. The fight was his last. James was a highly regarded heavyweight who in February 1954 had performed well in sparring matches against Sanders. Sanders, who had complained previously of headaches and had his shoulder X-rayed just a few weeks prior, was uncharacteristically listless in the opinion of some observers. James and Sanders traded heavy blows for ten rounds. In the eleventh round, Sanders appeared "tired", in James’ estimation, and was felled by a simple punch combination. Sanders dropped to the canvas and lost consciousness immediately, breathing laboriously while lying on his side. Ring personnel carried him out of the ring by stretcher.

Sanders never regained consciousness and died after a long surgery to relieve pressure on the brain. The coroner concluded that Sanders likely aggravated a previous injury, which may have been detected under modern boxing rules that require a pre- and post- fight examination and the automatic 45 day suspension after a contest with 30 of those being a ban on contact training. Sanders was laid to rest at Woodlawn Cemetery in Santa Monica, California, after a 21-gun military salute.
