= Geza Furetz =

Romanian boxer (born 1930)

Personal information
- Nationality: Romanian
- Born: 12 June 1930 Timișoara, Romania

Sport
- Sport: Boxing

Achievements and titles
- Olympic finals: 1952 Summer Olympics

Geza Furetz (born 12 June 1930) is a Romanian former boxer. He competed in the men's heavyweight event at the 1952 Summer Olympics.
