= Joseph Shaw (boxer) =

American boxer

Personal information
- Born: August 11, 1938 St. Louis, Missouri, U.S.
- Died: December 19, 2005 (aged 67) Charleston, South Carolina, U.S.

Sport
- Sport: Boxing

Joseph Shaw (August 11, 1938 – December 19, 2005) was an American professional boxer who competed from 1957 to 1970. As an amateur, he competed in the men's light welterweight event at the 1956 Summer Olympics.
