= Alberto Sáenz =

Argentine boxer

Personal information
- Nationality: Argentine
- Born: 12 July 1934 (age 91)

Sport
- Sport: Boxing
Medal record
Men's amateur boxing
Representing Argentina
Pan American Games
Bronze medal – third place	1955 Mexico City	Light middleweight

Alberto Sáenz (born 12 July 1934) is an Argentine boxer. He competed in the men's light middleweight event at the 1956 Summer Olympics.
