= Lee Shih-chuan =

Taiwanese boxer

Personal information
- Nationality: Taiwanese
- Born: 11 December 1931

Sport
- Sport: Boxing

Lee Shih-chuan (Chinese: 藺世全; pinyin: Lìn Shìquán; born 11 December 1931) is a Taiwanese boxer. He competed in the men's welterweight event at the 1956 Summer Olympics.
