= Thomas Americo =

East Timorese boxer

- Born: December 24, 1958
- Died: September 7, 1999 (aged 40); Dili
- Occupation: Boxer

Thomas Americo (December 24, 1958 – September 7, 1999) was an East Timorese professional boxer. Americo won the Oriental and Pacific Boxing Federation's Super Lightweight title in only his second recorded professional fight, and in only his third fight, he became the first Indonesian (at the time, East Timor had not gained independence from Indonesia) fighter to challenge for a world title, when he fought World Boxing Council Super Lightweight (Junior Welterweight) champion of the world, Saoul Mamby. In becoming the first Indonesian to fight for a world title, Americo became also the first boxer from East Timor to do so.

== Professional boxing career ==
Thomas Americo began boxing professionally on April 19, 1980, taking on the far more experienced, Australian Eddie Buttoms, who had 60 wins, 13 losses and 7 draws (ties) but who was nearing the end of his own boxing career. This fight took place in Malang, and Americo upset his opponent with a ten round decision win, after which Buttoms retired. In his next fight, Americo was pitted against hot prospect Sang Mo-Koo of Busan, South Korea. Mo-Koo was being touted as a possible world title challenger for Mamby's WBC crown and had a record of 21-1-2, with 13 knockout wins. This bout was held on August 15, 1980 at Jakarta. Once again, Americo upset a far more experienced rival by knocking the South Korean out in round eight to win the OPBF Super Lightweight title. With these two upset wins, Americo became ranked by the WBC in the Super Lightweight division and got the world title chance that Mo-Koo was expected to receive next.

=== World Title challenge ===
Next, Americo challenged the world traveling, WBC world Super Lightweight champion Saoul Mamby. Mamby had fought in Puerto Rico, Canada, Jamaica, Venezuela, the Dominican Republic, Thailand, France, Curacao and South Korea besides fights in his native United States (he would later also fight in Nigeria, Mexico, Guyana, Spain, Zambia and the Cayman Islands as well). Mamby was 30-12-5 with 14 knockouts coming into their bout, compared to Americo's 2-0 with one knockout. Mamby-Americo was the first world title fight ever held in Indonesia. The bout was held on August 29, 1981, exactly 1 year and 2 weeks after Americo's prior fight. It took place at Jakarta's Bung Karno Stadium. After 15 torrid rounds, Americo did enough to have Japanese judge Takeo Ugo score the bout a draw at 146-146, but lost on the scorecards of Italian Marcello Berlini by 147-139 and Mexican-American Rudy Ortega by 146-141, therefore losing the fight by a majority decision.

=== Rest of career ===
Next, Americo faced another world-caliber fighter, former WBC world Super-Lightweight Champion, South Korean Sang-Hyun Kim. This bout was held on December 20, 1981 at Daejeon, South Korea, marking the first time Americo boxed abroad as a professional. Americo lost the bout, and with it recognition as OPBF Super Lightweight champion, by a twelve round decision. Next, Americo went to Sydney, Australia, to face Australian veteran Jeff Malcolm, 57-19-9, as part of a boxing undercard topped by a fight between Paul Ferreri and John Feeney. This boxing card has the peculiarity of being the only one ever held at the world famous Sydney Opera House. On April 2, 1982, Americo suffered his third loss in a row, beaten on points by Malcolm.

Thomas Americo next faced a list of mostly unremarkable foes, with a combined record of 28-19-4 before retiring from boxing. The possible exception was Rocky Pirottina, who was 16-3-2 when he and Americo faced off on April 4, 1984, and who defeated Americo on points after ten rounds. During this part of his career, Americo went 4-3-1 with 1 knockout, this being against 0-1 Agus Sabara on October 6, 1986, dispatched by Americo in five rounds.

In his last fight, on June 29, 1987, Americo fought Bongguk Kendy for the Indonesian national Super-Lightweight title; Kendy was 2-1 coming in. Americo lost the bout by twelve round decision, retiring from boxing soon after.

He had a professional boxing record of 8 wins, 6 losses and 1 draw, with 3 knockout wins.

== Death ==
During the last days of the Indonesian occupation of East Timor, which lasted from 1975 to 1999, acts of violence happened in the streets of Dili, Americo's hometown. Americo was a victim of one of these, being dragged from his car and shot dead by militia on September 7, 1999, shortly before East Timor gained its independence.

== See also ==
- Joko Arter
- Chris John
- Ellyas Pical
