= José Sartor =

Argentine boxer

Personal information
- Nationality: Argentine
- Born: 5 April 1928
- Died: 24 August 1982 (aged 54)

Sport
- Sport: Boxing

José Sartor (5 April 1928 – 24 August 1982) was an Argentine boxer. He competed in the men's heavyweight event at the 1952 Summer Olympics.
