= László Bene =

Hungarian boxer

Personal information
- Nationality: Hungarian
- Born: 1924; Budapest, Hungary
- Died: July 1977 (aged 52–53)

Sport
- Sport: Boxing

László Bene (1924 – July 1977) was a Hungarian boxer. He competed in the men's heavyweight event at the 1952 Summer Olympics.
