= Leslie Mason =

Canadian boxer

Personal information
- Full name: Leslie Thomas Mason
- Born: 18 August 1934 (age 91); Stellarton, Nova Scotia, Canada

Sport
- Country: Canada
- Sport: Boxing

Thomas Leslie "Babe" Mason (born 18 August 1934) is a Canadian boxer. He competed in the men's light welterweight event at the 1956 Summer Olympics, while a member of the Canadian Army.
