= James Saunders (boxer) =

Canadian boxer

Personal information
- Born: 4 January 1932; Winnipeg, Manitoba, Canada
- Died: 28 May 1987 (aged 55)

Sport
- Sport: Boxing

James Saunders (4 January 1932 – 28 May 1987) was a Canadian boxer. He competed in the men's heavyweight event at the 1952 Summer Olympics. At the 1952 Summer Olympics, he lost to Giacomo Di Segni of Italy.

Nicknamed, "Babyface," Saunders compiled an outstanding amateur career, winning 109 of 115 total bouts. He represented Canada at both the 1952 Olympics and the 1954 British Empire Games.

He was inducted into the Manitoba Sports Hall of Fame in 2019.
