= Edgar Hearn =

British boxer

Personal information
- Full name: Edgar William Hearn
- Nationality: British
- Born: 2 April 1929; London, England
- Died: 4 October 1983 (aged 54)

Sport
- Sport: Boxing

Edgar Hearn (2 April 1929 – 4 October 1983) was a British boxer. He competed in the men's heavyweight event at the 1952 Summer Olympics.
