= Max Carlos =

Australian boxer

Personal information
- Nationality: Australian
- Born: 31 December 1935; Shepparton, Victoria, Australia
- Died: 12 May 1996 (aged 60)

Sport
- Sport: Boxing

Max Carlos (31 December 1935 – 12 May 1996) was an Australian boxer. He competed in the men's light welterweight event at the 1956 Summer Olympics.
