= Jean Lansiaux =

French boxer

Personal information
- Nationality: French
- Born: 2 March 1929
- Died: 24 January 2000 (aged 70)

Sport
- Sport: Boxing

Jean Lansiaux (2 March 1929 – 24 January 2000) was a French boxer. He competed in the men's heavyweight event at the 1952 Summer Olympics.
