= Song Soon-chun =

South Korean boxer (1934–2019)

- Born: 15 January 1934; Keijō, Keiki-dō, Korea, Empire of Japan (now Seoul, South Korea)
- Died: 15 October 2019 (aged 85)
- Occupation: Boxer

Song Soon-chun
Medal record

Men's Boxing

Representing South Korea

Olympic Games
Silver medal – second place	1956 Melbourne	Bantamweight

Asian Games
Bronze medal – third place	Tokyo 1958	Featherweight

Song Soon-Chun (Korean: 송순천; Hanja: 宋順天; 15 January 1934 – 15 October 2019) was a South Korean amateur boxer who won a silver medal at 1956 Summer Olympics in Melbourne, Australia.

== Career ==
Song was born in Seoul and competed for South Korea in the 1956 Summer Olympics held in Melbourne, Australia. In the bantamweight boxing event, he captured the silver medal. His silver medal was South Korea's first silver medal at the Olympic Games.

Song participated in the Olympics one more time in 1960, moving up in weight to featherweight, but was eliminated in the second round by eventual gold medalist Francesco Musso of Italy.

=== 1956 Olympic results ===
Below are the bouts of Song Soon-Chun, who competed for South Korea as a bantamweight in the 1956 Olympic boxing tournament in Melbourne, Australia:

- 1st Round: defeated Alberto Adela (Philippines) on points
- Round of 16: defeated Robert Bath (Australia) on points
- Quarterfinal: defeated Carmelo Tomaselli (Argentina) on points
- Semifinal: defeated Claudio Barrientos (Chile) on points
- Final: lost to Wolfgang Behrendt (Germany) on points; was awarded silver medal

=== Post competitive sports career ===
After receiving his PhD, Song served as a full professor at Yong-In University for 22 years. He was the leader of the Korean Olympian Association, which consisted of the corps of South Korea's Olympic medalists.

== Results ==
1956 Olympic Games
Event	Round	Result	Opponent	Score
Bantamweight	First	Win	(Philippines) Alberto Adela	pts
Bantamweight	Second	Win	(Australia) Robert Bath	pts
Bantamweight	Quarterfinal	Win	(Argentina) Carmelo Tomaselli	pts
Bantamweight	Semifinal	Win	(Chile) Claudio Barrientos	pts
Bantamweight	Final	Loss	(Germany) Wolfgang Behrendt	2-3

1960 Olympic Games
Event	Round	Result	Opponent	Score
Featherweight	First	Win	(Nigeria) Joseph Okezie	3-2
Featherweight	Second	Loss	(Italy) Francesco Musso	0-5
