= Henryk Kukier =

Polish boxer (1930–2020)

Personal information
- Born: 1 January 1930 Lublin, Poland
- Died: 5 December 2020 (aged 90) Strzelce Krajeńskie, Poland

Boxing career
Medal record
Men's amateur boxing
Representing Poland
European Amateur Championships
Gold medal – first place	1953 Warsaw	Flyweight
Bronze medal – third place	1955 West Berlin	Flyweight

Henryk Jerzy Kukier (1 January 1930 – 5 December 2020) was a Polish boxer.

== Career ==
Kukier won the gold medal in the Flyweight class at the 1953 European Amateur Boxing Championships in Warsaw, and the bronze medal at the 1955 European Amateur Boxing Championships in West Berlin. Kukier was a Polish champion six times (1953–1957 and 1960). He competed thrice in the Boxing at the Summer Olympics (1952, 1956, 1960). Between 1951 and 1960 he was on the Polish national team and fought 35 times, winning 25 bouts and losing 10.

== Death ==
Kukier was born in Lublin. He died from COVID-19 on 5 December 2020, at age 90, during the COVID-19 pandemic in Poland.
