= Hans Jost =

Swiss boxer

Personal information
- Full name: Robert Hans Jost
- Nationality: Swiss
- Born: 21 April 1922; Neuchâtel, Switzerland

Sport
- Sport: Boxing

Hans Jost (born 21 April 1922) was a Swiss boxer. He competed in the men's heavyweight event at the 1952 Summer Olympics.
