= Baek Do-seon =

South Korean boxer

Personal information
- Nationality: South Korean
- Born: 13 April 1930

Sport
- Sport: Boxing

Baek Do-seon (born 13 April 1930) is a South Korean boxer. He competed in the men's lightweight event at the 1956 Summer Olympics.
