= William Griffiths (boxer) =

Australian boxer

Personal information
- Nationality: Australian
- Born: 6 September 1932
- Died: 13 December 2010 (aged 78)

Sport
- Sport: Boxing

William Griffiths (6 September 1932 – 13 December 2010) was an Australian boxer. He competed in the men's lightweight event at the 1956 Summer Olympics.
