= Hwang Ui-gyeong =

South Korean boxer

Personal information
- Nationality: South Korean
- Born: 7 May 1930

Sport
- Sport: Boxing

Hwang Ui-gyeong (born 7 May 1930) is a South Korean former boxer. He competed in the men's light welterweight event at the 1956 Summer Olympics.
