= Ahmed Rashid (boxer) =

Pakistani boxer (born 1936)

Personal information
- Nationality: Pakistani
- Born: 1936 (age 89–90)

Sport
- Sport: Boxing

Ahmed Rashid (born 1936) is a Pakistani former boxer. He competed in the men's bantamweight event at the 1956 Summer Olympics where he reached the second round.
