= Thomas Schuster =

Fijian boxer

Personal information
- Born: 14 February 1937; Ba, Colony of Fiji, British Empire
- Died: 5 January 1990 (aged 52)

Sport
- Sport: Boxing

Thomas Schuster (14 February 1937 – 5 January 1990) was a Fijian boxer. He competed in the men's light welterweight event at the 1956 Summer Olympics.
