= Boxing at the 1955 Pan American Games =

The Men's Boxing Tournament at the 1955 Pan American Games was held in Mexico City, Mexico, from March 12 to March 26, with the inclusion of two new weight divisions (Light Welterweight and Light Middleweight) to the existing eight.

== Medal winners ==
Event	Gold	Silver	Bronze
Flyweight (– 51 kilograms)	Hilario Correa; Mexico	Manuel Lugo Vega; Chile	Ramón Arias; Venezuela
Bantamweight (– 54 kilograms)	Salvador Enriquez; Venezuela	Wardy Yee; United States	Roberto Lobos; Chile
Featherweight (– 57 kilograms)	Oswaldo Cañete; Argentina	Claudio Barrientos; Chile	Marcial Galicia; Mexico
Lightweight (– 60 kilograms)	Miguel Angel Péndola; Argentina	Gerardo Clemente; Puerto Rico	Ricardo Orta; Venezuela
Light Welterweight (– 63.5 kilograms)	Juan Carlos Rivero; Argentina	William Morton; United States	Celestino Pinto; Brazil
Welterweight (– 67 kilograms)	Joseph Dorando; United States	Antonio Nigri; Argentina	—
Light Middleweight (– 71 kilograms)	Paul Wright; United States	Raul Tovar; Venezuela	Alberto Sáenz; Argentina
Middleweight (– 75 kilograms)	Orville Pitts; United States	Miguel Safatle; Chile	Arnaldo Serra; Argentina
Light Heavyweight (– 81 kilograms)	Luis Ingnacio; Brazil	Antonio Escalante; Argentina	John Stewart; United States
Heavyweight (+ 81 kilograms)	Pablo Alexis Miteff; Argentina	Adão Waldemar; Brazil	Norvel Lee; United States

== Medal table ==
Place	Nation	Gold medal	Silver medal	Bronze medal	Total
1	Argentina	4	2	2	8
2	United States	3	2	2	7
3	Venezuela	1	1	2	4
4	Brazil	1	1	1	3
5	Mexico	1	0	1	2
6	Chile	0	3	1	4
7	Puerto Rico	0	1	0	1
Total		10	10	9	29
