= José Giorgetti =

Argentine boxer

Personal information
- Born: 19 June 1934; Buenos Aires, Argentina
- Died: 17 March 2004 (aged 69)

Sport
- Sport: Boxing

José Giorgetti (19 June 1934 – 17 March 2004) was an Argentine boxer. He competed in the men's heavyweight event at the 1956 Summer Olympics. At the 1956 Summer Olympics, he lost to Daniel Bekker of South Africa.
