= Lev Mukhin =

Soviet boxer (1936–1977)

Personal information
- Born: 15 October 1936 Konstantinovsk, Rostov Oblast, Russian SFSR, Soviet Union
- Died: 25 April 1977 (aged 40)

Sport
- Sport: Boxing
- Club: Spartak Rostov
Medal record
Representing the Soviet Union
Olympic Games
Silver medal – second place	1956 Melbourne	+81 kg

Lev Dmitrievich Mukhin (Russian: Лев Дмитриевич Мухин; 15 October 1936 – 25 April 1977) was a Soviet heavyweight boxer. He won a silver medal at the 1956 Summer Olympics, losing the final to Pete Rademacher, who scored three knockdowns before the bout was stopped. Coming into the final Mukhin had knocked out all his opponents, despite two of them knocking him down in the first round.

Mukhin took up boxing in 1951, and in 1955 won the Soviet title, finishing second at the Soviet championships. He placed second again in 1956 and never competed internationally except for the 1956 Olympics.

== 1956 Olympic results ==
Below is the record of Lev Mukhin, a heavyweight boxer from the Soviet union who competed at the 1956 Melbourne Olympics:

- Round of 16: defeated Bozhil Lozanov (Bulgaria) by a third-round knockout
- Quarterfinal: defeated Törner Åhsman (Sweden) by a first-round knockout
- Semifinal: defeated Giacomo Bozzano (Italy) by a third-round knockout
- Final: lost to Pete Rademacher (United States) by a first-round knockout (was awarded silver medal)
