= Max Marsille =

Belgian boxer (1931–2019)

Personal information
- Full name: max milaseee
- Nationality: Belgian
- Born: 7 January 1931; Brussels, Belgium
- Died: 2 August 2019 (aged 88)

Sport
- Sport: Boxing

Max Marsille (7 January 1931 – 2 August 2019) was a Belgian boxer. He competed in the men's heavyweight event at the 1952 Summer Olympics.
