= Edgar Gorgas =

German boxer (1928–2019)

Personal information
- Nationality: German
- Born: 23 April 1928; Essen, Germany
- Died: 15 May 2019 (aged 91)

Sport
- Sport: Boxing

Edgar Gorgas (23 April 1928 – 15 May 2019) was a German boxer. He competed in the men's heavyweight event at the 1952 Summer Olympics.
