= André Vairolatto =

French boxer

Personal information
- Nationality: French
- Born: 11 February 1934; Bize-Minervois, Aude, France
- Died: 12 December 2021 (aged 87); Lyon, Rhône, France

Sport
- Sport: Boxing

André Vairolatto (11 February 1934 – 12 December 2021) was a French boxer. He competed in the men's lightweight event at the 1956 Summer Olympics.
