= Gul Rehmat =

Pakistani boxer (born 1934)

Personal information
- Nationality: Pakistani
- Born: 1934 (age 91–92)

Sport
- Sport: Boxing

Gul Rehmat (born 1934) is a Pakistani former boxer. He competed in the men's light welterweight event at the 1956 Summer Olympics. He was defeated in the first round by the eventual silver medalist, Franco Nenci of Italy.
