= Aleksandr Zasukhin =

Russian boxer (1928–2012)

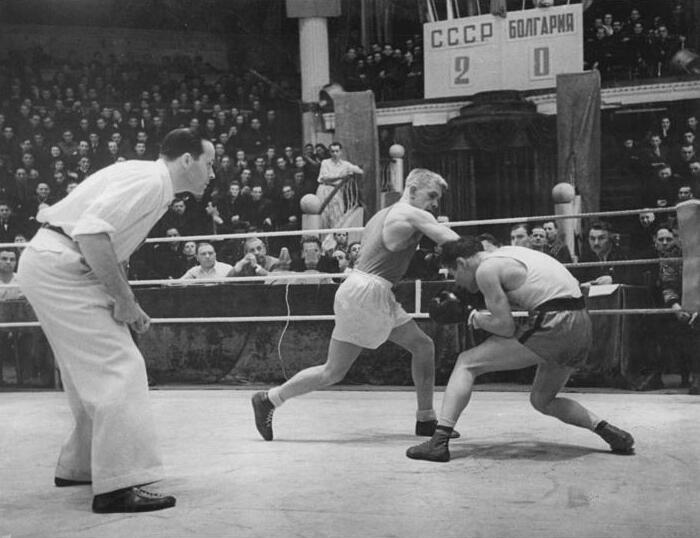
- A. Zasuchin vs. I. Gjurjew

Personal information
- Born: 15 July 1928 Yekaterinburg, Russian SFSR, Soviet Union
- Died: 15 August 2012 (aged 84)

Sport
- Sport: Boxing
- Club: Dynamo Yekaterinburg
Medal record
Representing the Soviet Union
European Championships
Silver medal – second place	1953 Warsaw	-57 kg
Silver medal – second place	1955 West Berlin	-57 kg

Aleksandr Fedoseyevich Zasukhin (Russian: Александр Федосеевич Засухин, 15 July 1928 – 15 August 2012) was a Soviet boxer who won two silver medals at the European championships of 1953 and 1955. He competed at the 1952 Olympics, but was eliminated in the second bout. During his career Zasukhin won four national titles (1950, 1954, 1956, 1957) and 165 bouts out of 185.

Zasukhin graduated from the Krasnodar Institute of Physical Education, where he defended a PhD in pedagogy and became professor. In the 1960s he moved to Perm, and later worked as a boxing coach in Bulgaria. His younger brother Aleksei also won a European silver medal in boxing.
