= John Lyttle =

Irish boxer

Personal information
- Nationality: Irish
- Born: 20 January 1931; Belfast, Northern Ireland
- Died: 15 November 1997 (aged 66); Belfast, Northern Ireland

Sport
- Sport: Boxing

John Lyttle (20 January 1931 – 15 November 1997) was an Irish boxer. He competed in the men's heavyweight event at the 1952 Summer Olympics.
