= Nicolae Linca =

Romanian boxer (1929–2008)

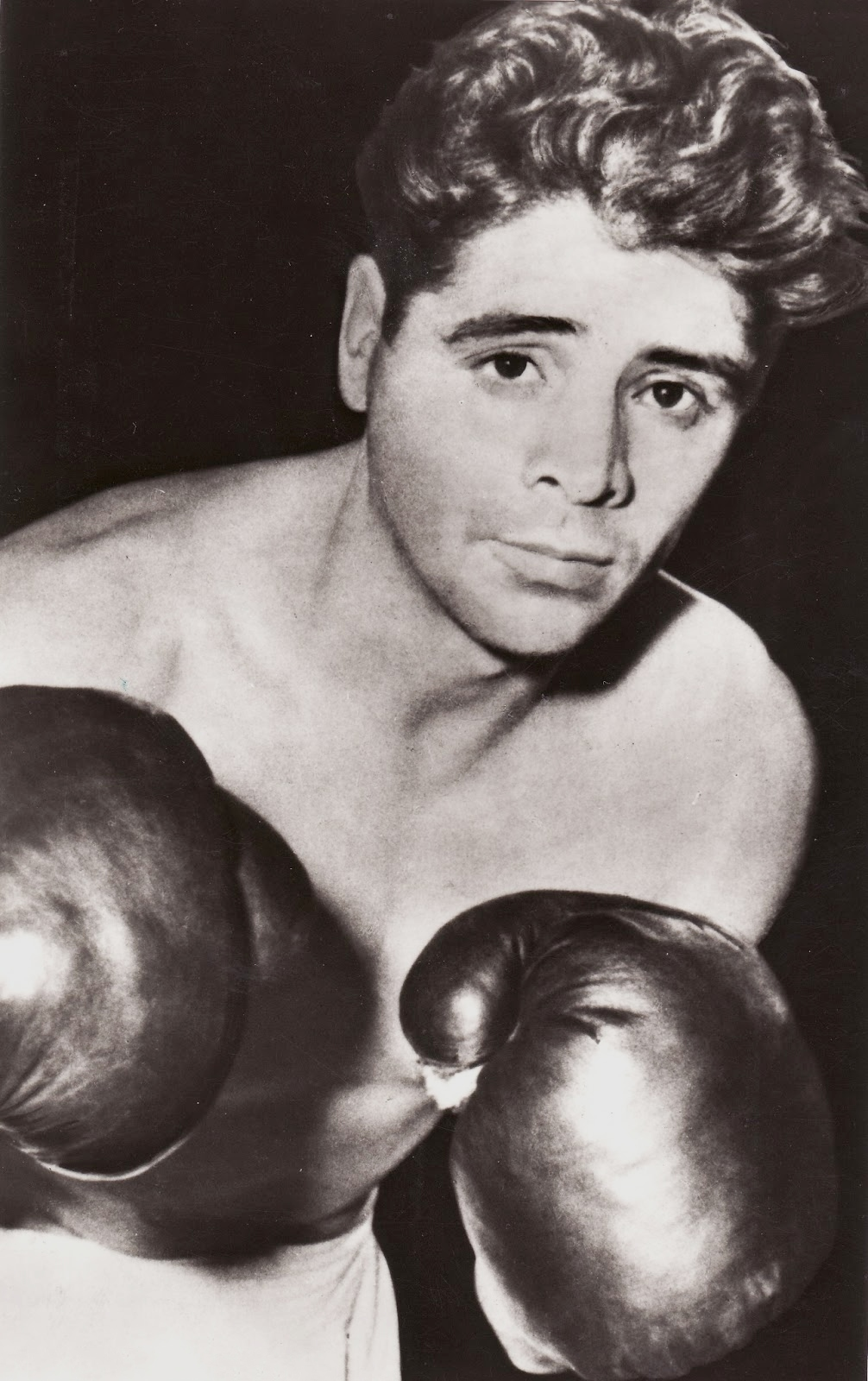

Personal information
- Born: 1 January 1929 Cergăul Mare, Blaj, Romania
- Died: 27 June 2008 (aged 79) Feisa, Romania

Sport
- Sport: Boxing
- Club: Dinamo Bucharest
- Coached by: Constantin Nour.
Medal record
Representing Romania
Romania National Amateur Boxing Championships
Gold medal – first place	1949 Bucharest	-67 kg
Gold medal – first place	1950 Bucharest	-67 kg
Gold medal – first place	1951 Bucharest	-67 kg
Silver medal – second place	1952 Bucharest	-67 kg
Gold medal – first place	1953 Galați, Brașov and Bucharest	-67 kg
Silver medal – second place	1958 Bucharest	-67 kg
Silver medal – second place	1960 Bucharest	-71 kg
Olympic Games
Gold medal – first place	1956 Melbourne	-67 kg
European Amateur Championships
Bronze medal – third place	1953 Warsaw	-67 kg
Bronze medal – third place	1955 Berlin	-67 kg

Nicolae Linca (1 January 1929 – 27 June 2008) was a Romanian amateur welterweight boxer. After winning bronze medals at the 1953 and 1955 European championships, he became Romania's first Olympic champion in boxing at the 1956 Summer Olympics. Fighting with a broken finger, he won against Fred Tiedt in a 3:2 split decision. Today, he remains the only Romanian boxer to win gold at the Olympics. His amateur record upon retirement was 281–25. After competing as an amateur, Linca turned to coaching in the sport. By the 1990s he was living in poverty and suffering from Parkinson's and Alzheimer's diseases, which led to his deaths at the age of 79. In 2005 he was awarded the Sports Merit Order of First Class.

== Highlights ==
1956 Summer Olympics
Event	Round	Result	Opponent	Score
Welterweight	First	Win	(Fiji) Hector hatch	PTS
Welterweight	Quarterfinal	Win	(South Africa) Nicholas Andre	PTS
Welterweight	Semifinal	Win	(England) Nicholas Gargano	PTS
Welterweight	Final	Win	(Republic of Ireland) Fred Tiedt	3-2
