= Robert Bath =

Australian boxer (1936–2025)

Bob Bath
Personal information
- Full name: Robert Gordon Bath
- Nationality: Australian
- Born: 16 September 1936
- Died: 9 September 2025 (aged 88)

Sport
- Sport: Boxing

Robert Gordon Bath OAM (16 September 1936 – 9 September 2025) was an Australian boxer. He competed in the men's bantamweight event at the 1956 Summer Olympics. At the 1956 Summer Olympics he defeated Hempala Jayasuriya of Ceylon, before losing to Song Soon-chun of South Korea. He was from Buninyong, Victoria. He was a recipient of the Medal of the Order of Australia (OAM).

Bath was born in 1936. He taught physical education and sports at Ballarat Grammar School from 1958 until he retired in 1995. Bath died on 9 September 2025.
