= András Dőri =

Hungarian boxer

András Dőry
Personal information
- Nationality: Hungarian
- Born: 29 September 1930 Répáspuszta, Hungary
- Died: 22 September 2013 (aged 82)

Sport
- Sport: Boxing

András Dőry (29 September 1930 – 22 September 2013) was a Hungarian boxer. He competed in the men's welterweight event at the 1956 Summer Olympics.
