= Walter Kozak =

Canadian boxer

Personal information
- Nationality: Canadian
- Born: 1931
- Died: 6 March 2016 (aged 84–85)

Sport
- Sport: Boxing

Walter Kozak (1931 – 6 March 2016) was a Canadian boxer. He competed in the men's welterweight event at the 1956 Summer Olympics.
