= Edward Beattie =

Canadian boxer (born 1934)

Personal information
- Nationality: Canadian
- Born: 4 February 1934 (age 92) Kilsyth, Scotland

Sport
- Sport: Boxing

Edward Beattie (born 4 February 1934) is a Canadian boxer. He competed in the men's lightweight event at the 1956 Summer Olympics.
