= Anatoly Lagetko =

Soviet boxer (1936–2006)

Medal record

Men's Boxing

Representing Soviet Union

Olympic Games
Bronze medal – third place	1956 Melbourne	Lightweight

Anatoly Lagetko (6 November 1936 – 13 August 2006) was a boxer from the Soviet Union. He was born in Tokmak, Ukrainian SSR. He competed for the Soviet Union in the 1956 Summer Olympics held in Melbourne, Australia in the lightweight event, where he finished in third place.
