= Celestino Pinto =

Brazilian boxer (1931–1989)

Personal information
- Born: 11 August 1931 Rio de Janeiro, Brazil
- Died: 18 June 1989 (aged 57)

Sport
- Sport: Boxing
Medal record
Men's amateur boxing
Representing Brazil
Pan American Games
Bronze medal – third place	1955 Mexico City	Light welterweight

Celestino Pinto (11 August 1931 - 18 June 1989) was a Brazilian boxer. He competed at the 1952 Summer Olympics and the 1956 Summer Olympics.
