= Carl Fitzgerald (boxer) =

Australian boxer

Personal information
- Nationality: Australian
- Born: 13 May 1928; Warwick, Queensland, Australia
- Died: 23 April 1954 (aged 25); Warwick, Queensland, Australia

Sport
- Sport: Boxing

Carl Fitzgerald (13 May 1928 – 23 April 1954) was an Australian boxer. He competed in the men's heavyweight event at the 1952 Summer Olympics.
