= Henrik Ottesen =

Danish boxer

Personal information
- Nationality: Danish
- Born: 29 January 1934; Skive, Denmark
- Died: 7 January 2020 (aged 85)

Sport
- Sport: Boxing

Henrik Ottesen (29 January 1934 – 7 January 2020) was a Danish boxer. He competed in the men's bantamweight event at the 1956 Summer Olympics.
