= Aleksei Zasukhin =

Russian boxer (1937–1996)

Personal information
- Born: 18 March 1937 Sverdlovsk, Russian SFSR, Soviet Union
- Died: 27 May 1996 (aged 59)

Sport
- Sport: Boxing
- Club: Dynamo Yekaterinburg
Medal record
Representing the Soviet Union
European Championships
Silver medal – second place	1961 Belgrade	-57 kg

Aleksei Fedoseyevich Zasukhin (Russian: Александр Федосеевич Засухин, 18 March 1937 – 27 May 1996) was a Soviet boxer who won a national title and a European silver medal in 1961. He retired in 1962 after finishing second in the Soviet championships. During his career Zasukhin won 150 bouts out of 170. He graduated from the Belarusian State University of Physical Training, and later worked as a boxing coach in Yekaterinburg and in Saint Petersburg. His elder brother Aleksandr was an Olympic boxer and an inspiration for Aleksei.
