= Claude Saluden =

French boxer

Personal information
- Nationality: French
- Born: 25 May 1937
- Died: 30 November 1996 (aged 59)

Sport
- Sport: Boxing

Claude Saluden (25 May 1937 – 30 November 1996) was a French boxer. He competed in the men's light welterweight event at the 1956 Summer Olympics.
