= Vichai Limcharoen =

Thai boxer

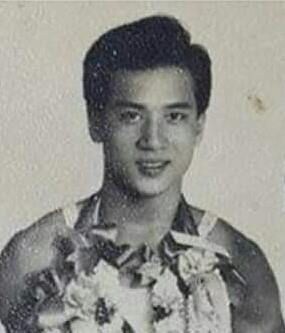

Personal information
- Nationality: Thai
- Born: 1936 (age 88–89)

Sport
- Sport: Boxing

Vichai Limcharoen (born 1936) is a Thai boxer. He competed in the men's bantamweight event at the 1956 Summer Olympics.
