= Zenon Stefaniuk =

Polish boxer

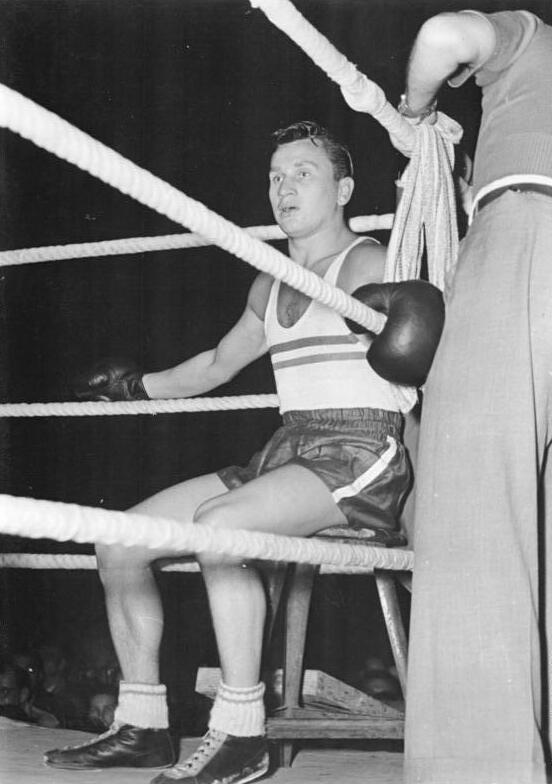

Medal record

Men's Boxing

Representing Poland

European Amateur Championships
Gold medal – first place	1953 Warsaw	Bantamweight
Gold medal – first place	1955 West Berlin	Bantamweight

Zenon Stefaniuk (8 July 1930, in Wojnów – 10 July 1985, in Katowice) was a Polish boxer.

He twice won the gold medal at the European Amateur Boxing Championships in the Bantamweight division at Warsaw 1953 and West Berlin 1955. He participated in the 1956 Summer Olympics in Melbourne but without success.

He was four-time winner of the Polish Boxing Championship (1952–1955), and represented Poland seven times in international matches (six wins, one loss).
