= Eduard Borisov =

Russian boxer (born 1934)

Personal information
- Nationality: Soviet
- Born: 3 February 1934 (age 91)

Sport
- Sport: Boxing

Eduard Valentinovich Borisov (born 3 February 1934) is a Soviet boxer. He competed in the men's welterweight event at the 1956 Summer Olympics.
