= Owen Reilly =

British boxer

Personal information
- Nationality: British
- Born: 21 January 1937 Glasgow, Scotland
- Died: 21 March 2011 (aged 74)

Sport
- Sport: Boxing

Owen Reilly (21 January 1937 – 21 March 2011) was a British boxer. He competed in the men's bantamweight event at the 1956 Summer Olympics. Reilly won the 1956 Amateur Boxing Association British bantamweight title, when boxing out of the Royal Air Force BC.
