= Henry Loubscher =

South African boxer

Medal record

Men's Boxing

Representing South Africa

Olympic Games
Bronze medal – third place	1956 Melbourne	Light Welterweight

Henry James Loubscher (born 9 August 1936 in Germiston) is a former boxer from South Africa, bronze medalist at the 1956 Summer Olympics in Melbourne.
