= Pete Rademacher =

American heavyweight boxer (1928–2020)

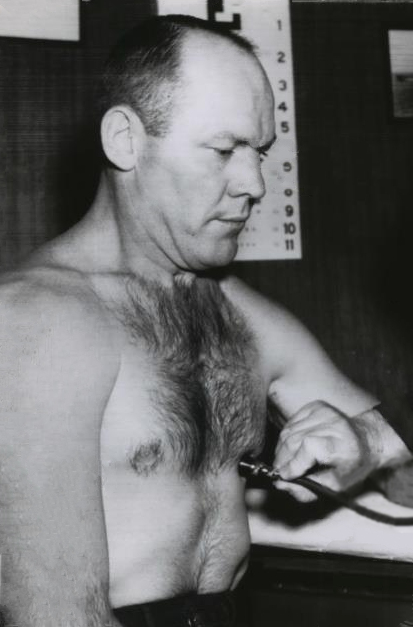
- Rademacher in 1961

Personal information
- Nationality: American
- Born: Thomas Peter Rademacher; November 20, 1928 Tieton, Washington, U.S.
- Died: June 4, 2020 (aged 91) Sandusky, Ohio, U.S.
- Height: 187 cm (6 ft 2 in)
- Weight: Heavyweight

Boxing career
- Reach: 196 cm (77 in)
- Stance: Orthodox

Boxing record
- Total fights: 23
- Wins: 15
- Win by KO: 8
- Losses: 7
- Draws: 1
Medal record
Representing the United States
Olympic Games
Gold medal – first place	1956 Melbourne	+81 kg

Thomas Peter Rademacher (November 20, 1928 – June 4, 2020) was an American heavyweight boxer. As an amateur, he was a gold medalist at the 1956 Olympics. Rademacher became the only person to challenge for the world heavyweight championship in his first professional bout when he faced Floyd Patterson in Seattle on August 22, 1957. He compiled a 15-7-1 record over 23 professional bouts.

A former college football player at Washington State, Rademacher took up boxing as a form of rehabilitation during his recovery from rheumatic fever, which he contracted in military school.

== Amateur career ==
In his amateur career, Rademacher won 72 bouts and lost 7. He won a series of tournaments, including the 1949 and 1951–1953 Seattle Golden Gloves (he lost in 1950 to Zora Folley, who was his frequent opponent throughout his boxing career), and the US Amateur Championship as a heavyweight in 1953—avenging his earlier loss to Folley.

He captured the Chicago Golden Gloves, the All-Army championship, and the Service championship in 1956, before qualifying for the Olympic team. At the Olympics, he captured a gold medal in the heavyweight division and served as the U.S. flag bearer at the closing ceremony.

=== 1956 Olympic results ===
- Round of 16: bye
- Quarterfinal: Defeated Josef Němec (Czechoslovakia) KO 2
- Semifinal: Defeated Daan Bekker (South Africa) KO 3
- Final: Defeated Lev Mukhin (Soviet Union) KO 1 (won gold medal)

Rademacher also attended college, playing offensive line on the football team for Washington State.

== Professional career ==
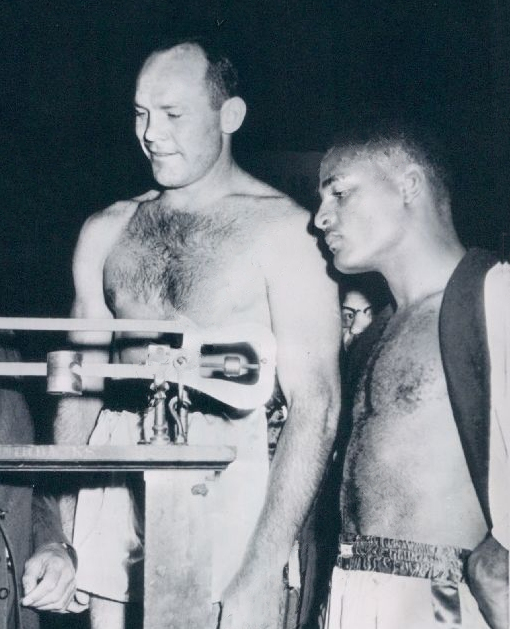
Rademacher and Folley in 1958

After winning the gold medal, Rademacher started saying that he would be able to become world heavyweight champion in his first professional fight. He made his belief public and was able to lure world Heavyweight champion Floyd Patterson into defending his crown against him in his professional debut. It is the only time to date that a fighter making his professional debut has challenged for the world heavyweight title.

The bout, at Sick's Stadium in Seattle, was refereed by former light-heavyweight champion Tommy Loughran, who himself had contended for the heavy crown once, vs. Primo Carnera, in 1934. Rademacher dropped Patterson in round two, but Patterson recovered and knocked Rademacher down seven times, defeating him by a knockout in round six. Legendary boxing promoter Jack Hurley promoted the match.

Rademacher fought Zora Folley, Brian London, George Chuvalo, Buddy Turman, and the former world light heavyweight champion, Archie Moore. He lost to Moore, Folley and London but beat Chuvalo, LaMar Clark, and Turman, among others. His last bout was with former world middleweight champion Carl "Bobo" Olson, whom he beat by decision.

== Personal life ==
Rademacher had Finnish ancestry; his maternal grandparents were immigrants from Finland. He was married to Margaret and had a daughter Susan (born c. 1954–1955). In addition to boxing, he was a salesman and inventor. He was president of the company Kiefer-McNeil which was founded by fellow Olympian, Adolph Kiefer. Rademacher died in Sandusky, Ohio on June 4, 2020, at the age of 91. His brain was donated for medical research.

== Professional boxing record ==
23 fights	15 wins	7 losses
By knockout	8	6
By decision	7	1
Draws	1	

No.	Result	Record	Opponent	Type	Round, time	Date	Location	Notes
23	Win	15–7–1	(United States) Bobo Olson	UD	10	Apr 3, 1962	(United States) Honolulu Stadium, Honolulu, Hawaii, U.S.	
22	Loss	14–7–1	(Germany) Karl Mildenberger	PTS	10	Jan 20, 1962	Westfalenhallen, Dortmund, Germany	
21	Win	14–6–1	(United States) Buddy Turman	TKO	9 (10)	Nov 30, 1961	(United States) Fair Park Coliseum, Dallas, Texas, U.S.	
20	Loss	13–6–1	(United States) Archie Moore	TKO	6 (10), 2:10	Oct 23, 1961	(United States) Baltimore Coliseum, Baltimore, Maryland, U.S.	
19	Loss	13–5–1	(United States) George Logan	KO	2 (10), 2:40	Aug 17, 1961	(United States) Boise, Idaho, U.S.	
18	Loss	13–4–1	(United States) Doug Jones	KO	5 (10), 0:54	Apr 29, 1961	(United States) St. Nicholas Arena, New York City, New York, U.S.	
17	Win	13–3–1	(United States) Dan Vanderford	KO	1 (10), 2:17	Apr 14, 1961	(United States) Armory, Gastonia, North Carolina, U.S.	
16	Win	12–3–1	(United States) Harvey Taylor	KO	1 (10), 2:47	Feb 22, 1961	(United States) Yakima, Washington, U.S.	
15	Win	11–3–1	(United States) Donnie Fleeman	UD	10	Jan 23, 1961	(United States) Seattle Civic Ice Arena, Seattle, Washington, U.S.	
14	Win	10–3–1	(Germany) Willi Besmanoff	UD	10	Dec 13, 1960	(United States) Cleveland Arena, Cleveland, Ohio, U.S.	
13	Win	9–3–1	(United States) Kirk Barrow	SD	10	Dec 8, 1960	(United States) Spokane Coliseum, Spokane, Washington, U.S.	
12	Win	8–3–1	(Canada) George Chuvalo	UD	10	Jul 19, 1960	Maple Leaf Stadium, Toronto, Canada	
11	Win	7–3–1	(United States) LaMar Clark	TKO	10 (10), 2:27	Jun 29, 1960	(United States) Derks Field, Salt Lake City, Utah, U.S.	
10	Loss	6–3–1	(United Kingdom) Brian London	KO	7 (10), 0:15	Apr 26, 1960	(United Kingdom) Empire Pool, London, England	
9	Draw	6–2–1	(Germany) Ulli Ritter	PTS	10	Apr 8, 1960	Sportpalast, Berlin, Germany	
8	Win	6–2	(Germany) Ulli Nitzschke	KO	7 (10)	Feb 6, 1960	Festhalle Frankfurt, Frankfurt, Germany	
7	Win	5–2	(United States) Johnny York	PTS	8	Dec 9, 1959	(United States) Cleveland Arena, Cleveland, Ohio, U.S.	
6	Win	4–2	(United States) Buddy Keener	KO	1 (10), 2:52	Nov 12, 1959	(United States) City Auditorium, Columbus, Georgia, U.S.	
5	Win	3–2	(United States) Calvin Butler	UD	10	Sep 29, 1959	(United States) Miami Beach Convention Center, Miami Beach, Florida, U.S.	
4	Win	2–2	(United States) Ralph Schneider	TKO	3 (10)	Sep 17, 1959	(United States) Greenville Memorial Auditorium, Greenville, South Carolina, U.S.	
3	Win	1–2	(United States) Tommy Thompson	RTD	5 (10)	Aug 23, 1959	(United States) Municipal Auditorium, Columbus, Georgia, U.S.	
2	Loss	0–2	(United States) Zora Folley	KO	4 (10), 1:15	Jul 25, 1958	(United States) Olympic Auditorium, Los Angeles, California, U.S.	
1	Loss	0–1	(United States) Floyd Patterson	KO	6 (15), 2:57	Aug 22, 1957	(United States) Sick's Stadium, Seattle, Washington, U.S.	For NYSAC and The Ring heavyweight titles

== See also ==
- Rafael Lovera
- Joves De La Puz
- Joko Arter
