= Rafael Lovera =

Paraguayan boxer (1952-2023)

Rafael Lovera Montiel (October 17, 1952 – August 21, 2023) was a former professional boxer from Paraguay. Lovera fought for the WBC's vacant world Junior Flyweight title, losing to Luis Estaba. Lovera was from Fernando de la Mora, Paraguay but he resided in Lambaré during the final years of his life.

== Boxing career ==
Lovera had the distinction of having fought for a world title in his only professional boxing match. Midway through 1975, the WBC desired its world Junior Flyweight champion, Italy's Franco Udella, to defend the title against Lovera. Udella refused and was stripped of the championship. Lovera then faced 28 wins, 7 losses and 2 draws (ties) with 20 knockouts veteran Luis Estaba for the vacant championship in Caracas, Venezuela, September 13, 1975. Apparently, WBC officials were unaware that Lovera had no professional boxing fighting experience. This was revealed to them after the bout took place. Lovera had previously fought as an amateur, but had a negative win-loss record as such. Estaba won the world title when he stopped the debuting contender in the fourth round. Lovera retired immediately afterwards, and he never returned to the professional boxing rings.

He stands as the first Paraguayan to challenge for a professional world boxing championship as well as one of the few boxers from Paraguay ever to challenge for a major professional boxing world title, and as one of the very few to do so in his first professional fight and to have challenged for a major world championship without ever actually winning a contest. His record was 0 wins and 1 loss in only 1 professional boxing bout.

== Death ==
It was announced that Lovera died of a heart attack, on August 21, 2023.

== See also ==
- List of Paraguayans
- Pete Rademacher-who challenged for the world heavyweight title in his first professional match
- Joves De La Puz
- Joko Arter
