= Bozhil Lozanov =

Bulgarian boxer (born 1934)

Personal information
- Nationality: Bulgarian
- Born: 16 August 1934 (age 90)

Sport
- Sport: Boxing

Bozhil Naydenov Lozanov (born 16 August 1934) is a Bulgarian boxer. He competed in the men's heavyweight event at the 1956 Summer Olympics.
