= Daniel Hellebuyck =

Belgian boxer (1933–2001)

Personal information
- Nationality: Belgian
- Born: 5 July 1933; East Flanders, Belgium
- Died: 26 May 2001 (aged 67)

Sport
- Sport: Boxing

Daniel Hellebuyck (5 July 1933 – 26 May 2001) was a Belgian boxer. He competed in the men's bantamweight event at the 1956 Summer Olympics.
