= Joko Arter =

Indonesian professional boxer

Joko Arter (1955-2007) was a professional boxer from Indonesia. In his only recorded professional boxing fight, he fought Min Keun Oh of South Korea, losing by second-round knockout.

== Professional boxing career ==
Joko Arter was a member of a boxing family that included his brothers Tejo, Jon Lee, Kid Manguni and Dobrax Arter.

In 1983, the International Boxing Federation was founded in the United States. In order to fill boxing weight divisions with some IBF recognized world champions, the fledging group recognized some established world champions from the WBA and WBC, like Marvelous Marvin Hagler, Aaron Pryor, Larry Holmes and Donald Curry as also being IBF world champions from the group's start, but it also sanctioned fights as being for their vacant world titles. In one instance, Filipino Joves De La Puz made his professional debut by fighting Satoshi Shingaki for their world Bantamweight title.

On March 3, 1984, Arter became the second Indonesian ever to fight for a professional boxing world championship after Thomas Americo four years before, when he faced Keun Oh for the IBF's vacant world Featherweight championship. Oh had a record of 12 wins and 2 losses coming into this fight. The two boxers traded punches at Munhwa Gymnasium in Seoul, South Korea, with Oh winning the world championship by second-round knockout.

Arter never again fought as a professional. He did remain in South Korea, electing to live out the rest of his life in the country, which he adopted as a second home.

Arter had a record of 0 wins and 1 loss in only 1 professional boxing contest.

== Death ==
Arter apparently died in 2007.

== See also ==
- Rafael Lovera
- Joves De La Puz
- Pete Rademacher
