= Giacomo Bozzano =

Italian boxer (1933–2008)

Olympic medal record

Men's Boxing
Bronze medal – third place	1956 Melbourne	Heavyweight

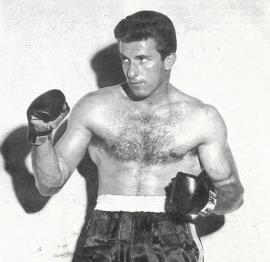
Giacomo "Mino" Bozzano

Giacomo "Mino" Bozzano (born 12 April 1933 in Sestri Levante - died 21 November 2008) was a former Italian boxer, who won the bronze medal in the Heavyweight division (+ 91 kg) at the 1956 Summer Olympics in Melbourne, Australia. He lost to Lev Mukhin of the Soviet Union and was eliminated, but then, at just age 23 he went into pro boxing post-Olympics.

== 1956 Olympic results ==
Below is the record of Giacomo Bozzano, an Italian heavyweight boxer who competed at the 1956 Melbourne Olympics:

- Round of 16: defeated Ilkka Koski (Finland) by decision
- Quarterfinal: defeated Ulrich Nitzschke (Germany) by decision
- Semifinal: lost to Lev Mukhin (Soviet Union) by third-round knockout (was awarded bronze medal)

== Pro career ==
Bozzano turned pro in 1957 and won his first 25 fights, including a win over Joey Maxim, before being KO'd by Hans Kalbfell in 1960. The following year he was upset by Gerhard Zech. Zech, who had only eight paid bouts to his credit and no amateur experience, figured to be another pushover. But Bozzano was obviously ring-rusty and in the second round the Berlin southpaw slammed a hefty right-hander to the Italian's ribs. He threw a left hook at Bozzano's chin and the Italian crumpled to the canvas, out cold.

In 1962, Bozzano took on Santo Amonti for the Italian heavyweight title. Bozzano played into Amonti's hands by carrying out repeated attacks at close quarters instead of relying on his superior reach and boxing skill. No knockdowns were scored but Bozzano soaked up a welter of punches by the third round that he was obliged to raise his arms in defeat, completely groggy. Bozzano retired after the bout.

He died in Sestri Levante in November 2008.

== Professional boxing record ==
31 Wins (15 knockouts, 15 decisions, 1 DQ), 3 Losses (3 knockouts)
Result	Record	Opponent	Type	Round	Date	Location	Notes
Loss	44-3-2	(Italy) Santo Amonti	TKO	3	13/10/1962	(Italy) Rome, Lazio	Italy Heavyweight Title.
Win	33-21-6	(Germany) Horst Niche	PTS	10	26/05/1962	(Italy) Genoa, Liguria	
Win	33-19-6	(Germany) Horst Niche	PTS	8	20/12/1961	(Italy) Bologna, Emilia-Romagna	
Win	14-9-1	(Belgium) Jose Peyre	TKO	7	22/11/1961	(Italy) Genoa, Liguria	
Win	27-22-3	(Belgium) Alain Cherville	TKO	8	30/09/1961	(Italy) Teatro Margherita, Genoa, Liguria	
Win	30-25-6	(Spain) José González Sales	KO	3	12/08/1961	(Italy) Genoa, Liguria	
Loss	8-0	(Germany) Gerhard Zech	KO	2	07/12/1960	(Italy) Palasport di San Siro, Milan, Lombardy	
Win	27-18-5	(United States) Bert Whitehurst	PTS	10	01/09/1960	(Italy) Palasport di San Siro, Milan, Lombardy	
Loss	24-5-1	(Germany) Hans Kalbfell	KO	8	05/11/1959	(Germany) Westfalenhallen, Dortmund, North Rhine-Westphalia	EBU Heavyweight Title Eliminator.
Win	0-1	(United States) Rocky Brown	KO	1	27/05/1959	(Italy) Milan, Lombardy	
Win	38-13-1	(Jamaica) Joe Bygraves	PTS	10	19/04/1959	(Italy) Velodromo Vigorelli, Milan, Lombardy	
Win	19-8-2	(France) Robert Duquesne	DQ	3	31/01/1959	(Italy) Palasport di San Siro, Milan, Lombardy	
Win	3-0	(Tonga) Sifa Kivalu	TKO	6	29/11/1958	(Italy) Milan, Lombardy	
Win	5-6-1	(Netherlands) Al Kramp	TKO	1	18/10/1958	(Italy) Palasport di San Siro, Milan, Lombardy	
Win	54-7-2	(Italy) Franco Cavicchi	KO	8	07/09/1958	(Italy) Bologna, Emilia-Romagna	
Win	20-4	(France) Emile Vidal	TKO	5	18/07/1958	(Italy) Foro Italico, Rome, Lazio	
Win	25-15-6	(Spain) José González Sales	TKO	4	15/06/1958	(Italy) Bologna Sports Palace, Bologna, Emilia-Romagna	
Win	82-27-4	(United States) Joey Maxim	PTS	10	27/04/1958	(Italy) Milan, Lombardy	
Win	4-4-3	(Germany) Ossi Buettner	PTS	8	08/02/1958	(Switzerland) Sporthalle, Basel	
Win	29-15-6	(Germany) Hans Friedrich	PTS	10	26/12/1957	(Italy) Palasport di San Siro, Milan, Lombardy	
Win	13-15-4	(France) Maurice Mols	PTS	8	26/10/1957	(Italy) Milan, Lombardy	
Win	21-14-7	(Italy) Uber Bacilieri	PTS	8	16/10/1957	(Italy) Milan, Lombardy	
Win	22-6-1	(Belgium) Alain Cherville	PTS	8	14/09/1957	(Italy) Milan, Lombardy	
Win	13-14-4	(France) Maurice Mols	PTS	8	27/07/1957	(Italy) Stadio Marassi, Genoa, Liguria	
Win	8-4	(Germany) Eriwn Hack	TKO	6	26/06/1957	(Italy) Milan, Lombardy	
Win	8-10-1	(France) Lucien Touzard	KO	4	29/05/1957	(Italy) Velodromo Vigorelli, Milan, Lombardy	
Win	2-2	(Belgium) Louis De Bolster	PTS	6	15/05/1957	(Italy) Genoa, Liguria	
Win	4-1	(Italy) Bonino Allevi	TKO	4	08/05/1957	(Italy) Chiavari, Liguria	
Win	34-13-1	(Belgium) Marcel Limage	TKO	5	27/04/1957	(Italy) Milan, Lombardy	
Win	5-2	(France) Armand Boudin	TKO	3	16/04/1957	(Italy) Pavia, Lombardy	
Win	5-1-1	(Germany) Hans Peter Drabes	PTS	6	03/04/1957	(Italy) Milan, Lombardy	
Win	3-5-1	(Germany) Heinz Lemm	PTS	6	20/03/1957	(Italy) Milan, Lombardy	
Win	2-7-3	(Germany) Horst Herold	PTS	6	13/03/1957	(Italy) Milan, Lombardy	
Win	2-4-1	(France) Dante Lepercq	TKO	5	02/03/1957	(Italy) Palasport di San Siro, Milan, Lombardy	
