= Francisco Gelaberti =

Argentine boxer

Personal information
- Nationality: Argentine
- Born: 10 August 1935 (age 89)

Sport
- Sport: Boxing

Francisco Gelaberti (born 10 August 1935) is an Argentine boxer. He competed in the men's welterweight event at the 1956 Summer Olympics.
