= Manuel de los Santos =

Filipino boxer (born 1928)

Personal information
- Nationality: Filipino
- Born: 1928 Philippine Islands

Sport
- Sport: Boxing
- Weight class: Light welterweight

Manuel de los Santos (born 1928) was a Filipino boxer. He competed in the men's light welterweight event at the 1956 Summer Olympics.
