= Antonio Marcilla =

Argentine boxer

Personal information
- Nationality: Argentine
- Born: 18 April 1934
- Died: 6 August 2014 (aged 80)

Sport
- Sport: Boxing

Antonio Marcilla (18 April 1934 – 6 August 2014) was an Argentine boxer. He competed in the men's light welterweight event at the 1956 Summer Olympics.
