= Nicholas André =

South African boxer

Personal information
- Nationality: South African
- Born: 7 October 1934; Durban, South Africa
- Died: 26 December 1990 (aged 56); Durban, South Africa

Sport
- Sport: Boxing

Nicholas Gaston André (7 October 1934 – 26 December 1990) was a South African boxer. He competed in the men's welterweight event at the 1956 Summer Olympics.
