= Leopold Potesil =

Austrian boxer (1933–2023)

Personal information
- Nationality: Austrian
- Born: 13 May 1933
- Died: 18 January 2023 (aged 89)

Sport
- Sport: Boxing

Leopold Potesil (13 May 1933 – 18 January 2023) was an Austrian boxer. He competed at the 1952 Summer Olympics and the 1956 Summer Olympics.

Potesil died on 18 January 2023, at the age of 89.
