= Mario Sitri =

Italian boxer (1936-2011)

Personal information
- Nationality: Italian
- Born: 29 January 1936; Livorno, Italy
- Died: 3 August 2011 (aged 75); Livorno, Italy

Sport
- Sport: Boxing

Mario Sitri (29 January 1936 – 3 August 2011) was an Italian boxer. He competed in the men's bantamweight event at the 1956 Summer Olympics.
