= Algirdas Šocikas =

Lithuanian boxer (1928–2012)

Personal information
- Born: 14 May 1928 Žalias Ostempas, Lithuania
- Died: 21 November 2012 (aged 84) Kaunas, Lithuania

Sport
- Sport: Boxing
Medal record
Representing the Soviet Union
European Amateur Championships
Gold medal – first place	1953 Warsaw	Heavyweight
Gold medal – first place	1955 West Berlin	Heavyweight

Algirdas Šocikas (14 May 1928 – 21 November 2012) was a Lithuanian amateur heavyweight boxer who won the European title in 1953 and 1955 and finished fifth at the 1952 Olympics. He won six Soviet (1950–1954, 1956), six Lithuanian (1947–1948, 1951–1953, 1956) and three Baltic championships (1948, 1950, 1952). After retiring in 1957 he worked as a boxing coach in Kaunas and raised the Olympic medalists Ričardas Tamulis and Jonas Čepulis, among others. He died in Kaunas, aged 84, and was buried in Petrašiūnai Cemetery.
