= Horymír Netuka =

Slovak boxer (1929–2001)

Personal information
- Nationality: Slovak
- Born: 17 September 1929 Trstená, Czechoslovakia
- Died: 26 August 2001 (aged 71) Nová Dubnica, Slovakia

Sport
- Sport: Boxing

Horymír Netuka (17 September 1929 – 26 August 2001) was a Slovak boxer. He competed in the men's heavyweight event at the 1952 Summer Olympics.
