= Joves De La Puz =

Filipino professional boxer

Joves De La Puz is a former professional boxer from the Philippines. In his only known professional boxing fight, he challenged for the then fledging International Boxing Federation's world Bantamweight title against Satoshi Shingaki.

== Title fight ==
De La Puz challenged Satoshi Shingaki for Shingaki's IBF world Bantamweight title on August 4, 1984 in Naha, Okinawa, Japan. The fight was a close one, lasting the fifteen round distance. De La Puz almost made history by becoming the first ever professional boxer to win a world championship in his very first professional fight, when he lost by a 15-round split decision, with scores of 144-147 and 144–146 against him and a 144-143 for him on the three judges' scorecards.

He never fought again as a professional; no explanation has been given for his not being able to fight again afterwards. He did, however, enjoy Okinawa so much that he decided to make it his permanent home and currently resides there.

His professional boxing record is 0 wins and 1 loss in one professional boxing contest.

== See also ==
- Joko Arter
- Rafael Lovera
- Pete Rademacher
