= Ilkka Koski =

Finnish boxer (1928–1993)

Personal information
- Born: 10 June 1928 Jyväskylä, Finland
- Died: 28 February 1993 (aged 64) Helsinki, Finland
- Height: 190 cm (6 ft 3 in)
- Weight: 92 kg (203 lb)

Sport
- Sport: Boxing
Medal record
Representing Finland
Bronze medal – third place	1952 Helsinki	Heavyweight

Ilkka Koski (10 June 1928 – 28 February 1993) was a Finnish heavyweight boxer who competed in the 1952 and 1956 Olympics. He won a bronze medal in 1952 and lost his first bout in 1956. Domestically he held the Finnish amateur heavyweight title in 1951–1956 and 1958. In 1958 he turned professional and had a record of seven victories (three by knockout), one loss and one draw, before retiring in 1962 due to an injury. In 2008 he was inducted into the Finnish Boxing Hall of Fame.
