= Carmelo Tomaselli =

Argentine boxer

Personal information
- Nationality: Argentine
- Born: 9 May 1938 (age 86)

Sport
- Sport: Boxing

Carmelo Tomaselli (born 9 May 1938) is an Argentine boxer. He competed in the men's bantamweight event at the 1956 Summer Olympics.
