= Zygmunt Milewski =

Polish boxer

Personal information
- Nationality: Polish
- Born: 3 February 1934; Danzig, Free City of Danzig
- Died: 31 December 2002 (aged 68); Gdańsk, Poland

Sport
- Sport: Boxing

Zygmunt Milewski (3 February 1934 – 31 December 2002) was a Polish boxer. He competed in the men's lightweight event at the 1956 Summer Olympics.
