= Freddie Gilroy =

Irish boxer (1936–2016)

Personal information
- Born: Frederick Gilroy; 7 March 1936 Belfast, Northern Ireland, U.K.
- Died: 28 June 2016 (aged 80) Belfast, Northern Ireland, U.K.
- Weight: Bantamweight

Boxing career
- Stance: Southpaw

Boxing record
- Total fights: 31
- Wins: 28
- Win by KO: 18
- Losses: 3
- Draws: 0
- No contests: 0
Medal record
Representing Ireland
Olympics
Bronze medal – third place	1956 Melbourne	Bantamweight

Frederick Gilroy (7 March 1936 – 28 June 2016) was a Northern Irish boxer. Gilroy won a bronze medal for Ireland at the 1956 Summer Olympics in Melbourne at Bantamweight. As a professional, he took the Commonwealth (British Empire) and European Bantamweight titles in 1959 and contended for the World Bantamweight Title in 1960.

== Early life and career ==
Freddie Gilroy was born on 7 March 1936 in the Ardoyne area of north Belfast, Northern Ireland. He got an early start in boxing by joining the St John Bosco amateur boxing club at the age of nine.

At the 1956 Summer Olympics in Melbourne, he won a bronze medal in bantamweight boxing. After a first round bye, Gilroy defeated Boris Stepanov of the Soviet Union by a third-round knockout. He then beat Mario Sitri of Italy on points, before losing to Wolfgang Behrendt of Germany on points.

== Pro career ==
=== Taking the British Empire and European Bantamweight titles, 1959 ===
Johnny Morrisey fell to Gilroy in an eighth-round knockout in Belfast on 17 September 1958 in the second round eliminator for the Commonwealth Bantamweight title.

On 10 January 1959 he defeated Peter Keenan decisively in an eleventh-round TKO in Belfast, Northern Ireland, to take the Commonwealth (British Empire) Bantamweight title. Most effective in the match was Gilroy's left hook. Keenan was floored in the third by a left hook, and was down for an eight count in the eighth. In the tenth, Keenan was twice down for counts of nine, before a towel from his corner signaled the end of the bout. Keenan, the former champion, fought courageously to stay in the bout as long as he did.

On 3 November 1959 he took the EBU European Bantamweight title from Italian Piero Rollo in a narrow fifteen round points decision in Wembley, London.

He successfully defended the British Empire Bantamweight title against South African Bernie Taylor on 5 December 1959. Winning in a fifth-round knockout in Belfast, Northern Ireland, he retained his title in a decisive victory.

=== Contending for the World Bantamweight title, 1960 ===
In 1960 he fought Alphonse Halimi for the World Bantamweight title but lost on points in London. Gilroy, the reigning European and British bantamweight champion, was the favorite of the partisan British crowd. Halimi scored the bout's only real knockdown with a short right hook in the thirteenth round for a count of five. Halimi slipped once to the mat in the seventh without taking a count.

On 20 October 1962, Gilroy fought fellow Belfast native and Olympic medalist John Caldwell in what is widely regarded as one of the greatest fights ever to be held in Ireland. Gilroy won when a cut to Caldwell's eye prevented him continuing the bout. He retained his British Empire Bantamweight title, and immediately announced his retirement from his short but successful boxing career.

He died at the age of eighty in Belfast, Northern Ireland on 28 June 2016. His funeral was at Holy Cross Church in Belfast.

== See also ==
- Ireland at the 1956 Summer Olympics
- Boxing at the 1956 Summer Olympics
- List of British bantamweight boxing champions
