= Luis Molina (boxer) =

American boxer

Personal information
- Nationality: American
- Born: October 11, 1938 Santa Barbara, California, United States
- Died: April 20, 2013 (aged 74)
- Weight: Lightweight

Boxing career
- Stance: orthodox

Boxing record
- Total fights: 42
- Wins: 32
- Win by KO: 20
- Losses: 10

Luis Molina (October 11, 1938 – April 20, 2013) was an American boxer. He competed in the lightweight event at the 1956 Summer Olympics.
