= Willi Roth =

German boxer

Personal information
- Nationality: German
- Born: 31 July 1929; Nußloch, Germany
- Died: 2 May 2017 (aged 87); Mörlenbach, Germany

Sport
- Sport: Boxing

Willi Roth (31 July 1929 – 2 May 2017) was a German boxer. He competed at the 1952 Summer Olympics and the 1956 Summer Olympics.
