= Harry Kurschat =

West German boxer (1930–2022)

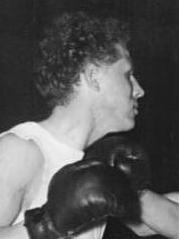
- Kurschat in 1952

Medal record

Men's boxing

Representing Germany

Olympic Games
Silver medal – second place	1956 Melbourne	Lightweight

Harry Kurschat (3 November 1930 – 21 January 2022) was a German boxer who competed in the lightweight division during his career as an amateur for West Germany. He was born and died in Berlin.

== Amateur career ==
Kurschat was the German amateur lightweight champion 1953, 1954, and 1956, as well as the European amateur champion in 1955. He was the Olympic silver medalist at 1956 Melbourne Olympic games in the lightweight class for United Team of Germany.

== Olympic results ==
- 1st round bye
- Defeated Celedonio Espinosa (Philippines) points
- Defeated Zygmunt Milewski (Poland) KO 3
- Defeated Tony Byrne (Ireland) points
- Lost to Richard McTaggart (Great Britain) points
