= Ulrich Nitzschke =

East German boxer

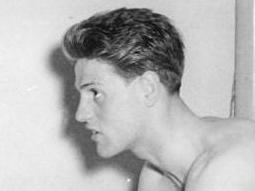
- Ulrich Nitzschke in 1955

Personal information
- Nationality: German
- Born: 25 July 1933; Quedlinburg, Germany
- Died: 23 July 2013 (aged 79); Chemnitz, Germany

Sport
- Sport: Boxing

Ulrich Nitzschke (25 July 1933 – 23 July 2013) was a German boxer. He competed in the men's heavyweight event at the 1956 Summer Olympics.
