= Pearce Lane =

American boxer (1930–2018)

Personal information
- Nationality: American
- Born: October 9, 1930 Big Rapids, Michigan, United States
- Died: July 27, 2018 (aged 87) Greenville, Michigan

Sport
- Sport: Boxing

Pearce Lane (October 9, 1930 – July 27, 2018) was an American boxer. He competed in the men's welterweight event at the 1956 Summer Olympics.
