= Tomislav Krizmanić (boxer) =

Croatian boxer (1929–2005)

Personal information
- Nationality: Croatian
- Born: 13 January 1929; Bosanski Petrovac, Yugoslavia
- Died: 10 October 2005 (aged 76); Zagreb, Croatia

Sport
- Sport: Boxing

Tomislav Krizmanić (13 January 1929 – 10 October 2005) was a Croatian boxer. He competed in the men's heavyweight event at the 1952 Summer Olympics.
