= Boris Stepanov =

Russian boxer

Personal information
- Nationality: Russian
- Born: 22 August 1930; Moscow, Soviet Union
- Died: 28 December 2007 (aged 77); Moscow, Russia

Sport
- Sport: Boxing

Boris Stepanov (22 August 1930 – 28 December 2007) was a Russian boxer. He competed in the men's bantamweight event at the 1956 Summer Olympics. At the 1956 Summer Olympics in Melbourne, he received a bye in the Round of 64 and then lost by knockout to Frederick Gilroy of Ireland in the Round of 32.
