= Constantin Dumitrescu (boxer) =

Romanian boxer

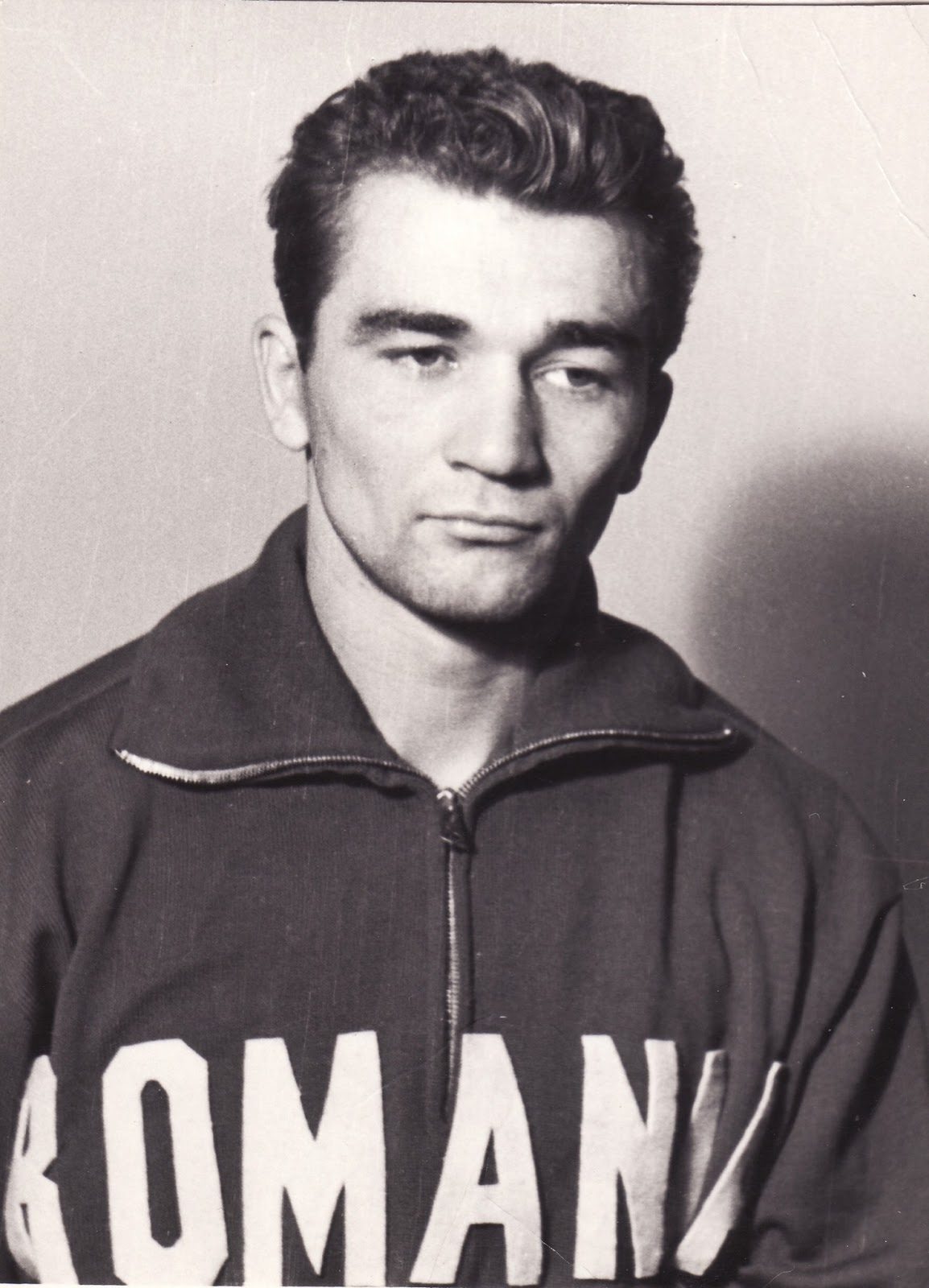

Personal information
- Born: 14 March 1931 (age 95) Bucharest, Romania

Sport
- Sport: Boxing
- Club: Dinamo Bucharest
- Coached by: Constantin Nour
Medal record
Romania National Amateur Boxing Championships
Gold medal – first place	1955 Bucharest	-63.5 kg
Gold medal – first place	1956 Bucharest	-63.5 kg
Gold medal – first place	1957 Bucharest	-63.5 kg
Gold medal – first place	1958 Bucharest	-63.5 kg
Gold medal – first place	1959 Bucharest	-63.5 kg
Representing Romania
Olympic Games
Bronze medal – third place	1956 Melbourne	-63.5 kg

Constantin "Titi" Dumitrescu (born 14 March 1931) is a retired light-welterweight boxer from Romania. He won five consecutive national titles in 1955–1959 and a bronze medal at the 1956 Olympics.

Dumitrescu took up boxing in 1946 under the guidance of his father George Dumitrescu. He announced his retirement right after winning his last national title in 1959. On the next day he was hired as a boxing coach and kept that job until 1985, raising 80 national champions.
