= Törner Åhsman =

Swedish boxer (1931–2016)

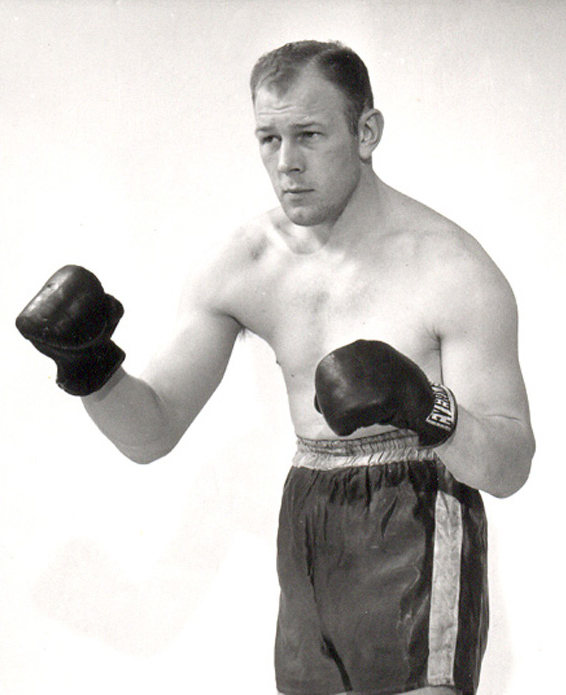

Personal information
- Born: 30 July 1931 Kungshamn, Sweden
- Died: 30 October 2016 (aged 85)
- Height: 181 cm (5 ft 11 in)

Sport
- Sport: Boxing
- Club: IK Balder, Stockholm

Gustav Edgar Törner Åhsman (30 July 1931 – 30 October 2016) was a Swedish heavyweight boxer. He competed at the 1956 Summer Olympics, but was eliminated in the second round by Lev Mukhin. After the Olympics he turned professional and had a record of 11 wins, 3 losses and 2 draws before retiring in 1962.

== 1956 Olympic results ==
Below is the record of Törner Åhsman, a Swedish heavyweight boxer who competed at the 1956 Melbourne Olympics:

- Round of 16: defeated Patrick Sharkey (Ireland) by third-round knockout
- Quarterfinal: lost to Lev Mukhin (Soviet Union) by first-round knockout
