= Kevin Hogarth =

Australian boxer

Medal record

Men's Boxing

Representing Australia

Olympic Games
Bronze medal – third place	1956 Melbourne	Welterweight

Kevin John Hogarth (10 February 1934 – 11 February 2022) was a boxer from Australia. He competed for Australia in the 1956 Summer Olympics held in Melbourne, Australia, in the welterweight event where he finished in third place. Unaware that both of the semi-final losers were awarded bronze medals, Hogarth didn't attend the medal ceremony, as he was at a harness racing meeting.
