= Boxing at the 1960 Summer Olympics – Light heavyweight =

Olympic boxing tournament

Light heavyweight boxing at the Games of the XVII Olympiad
- Venue: Palazzo dello Sport
- Dates: 26 August – 5 September 1960
- Competitors: 19 from 19 nations

Medalists
1st place, gold medalist(s)		Cassius Clay	United States
2nd place, silver medalist(s)		Zbigniew Pietrzykowski	Poland
3rd place, bronze medalist(s)		Anthony Madigan	Australia
3rd place, bronze medalist(s)		Giulio Saraudi	Italy

The men's light heavyweight event was part of the boxing programme at the 1960 Summer Olympics. The weight class allowed boxers of up to 81 kilograms to compete. The competition was held from 26 August to 5 September 1960. 19 boxers from 19 nations competed.

== Competition format ==
The competition was a straight single-elimination tournament, with no bronze medal match (two bronze medals were awarded, one to each semifinal loser).

== Schedule ==
Date	Time	Round
Friday, 26 August 1960	21:00	Round of 32
Tuesday, 30 August 1960	15:00; 21:00	Round of 16
Thursday, 1 September 1960	15:00; 21:00	Quarterfinals
Saturday, 3 September 1960	15:00	Semifinals
Monday, 5 September 1960	21:00	Final

== Results ==
=== Top half ===
Round of 32

Round of 16
Gennady Shatkov (URS)	5
Ray Cillien (LUX)	0
Cassius Clay (USA)	RSC
Yvon Becaus (BEL)
Lars-Olof Norling (SWE)	0
Tony Madigan (AUS)	5
George Oywello (UGA)	0
Gheorghe Negrea (ROU)	5

Quarterfinals
Gennady Shatkov (URS)	0
Cassius Clay (USA)	5
Tony Madigan (AUS)	KO
Gheorghe Negrea (ROU)

Semifinals
Cassius Clay (USA)	5
Tony Madigan (AUS)	0

=== Bottom half ===
Round of 32
Zbigniew Pietrzykowski (POL)	5
Carl Crawford (GUY)	0
Johnny Ould (GBR)	1
Petar Spasov (BUL)	4
Colm McCoy (IRL)	1
Matti Aho (FIN)	4

Round of 16
Muhammad Safdar (PAK)	0
Giulio Saraudi (ITA)	5
Rafael Gargiulo (ARG)	RSC
José Leite (BRA)
Emil Willer (EUA)	0
Zbigniew Pietrzykowski (POL)	5
Petar Spasov (BUL)	5
Matti Aho (FIN)	0

Quarterfinals
Giulio Saraudi (ITA)	3
Rafael Gargiulo (ARG)	2
Zbigniew Pietrzykowski (POL)	5
Petar Spasov (BUL)	0

Semifinals
Giulio Saraudi (ITA)	1
Zbigniew Pietrzykowski (POL)	4

=== Finals ===
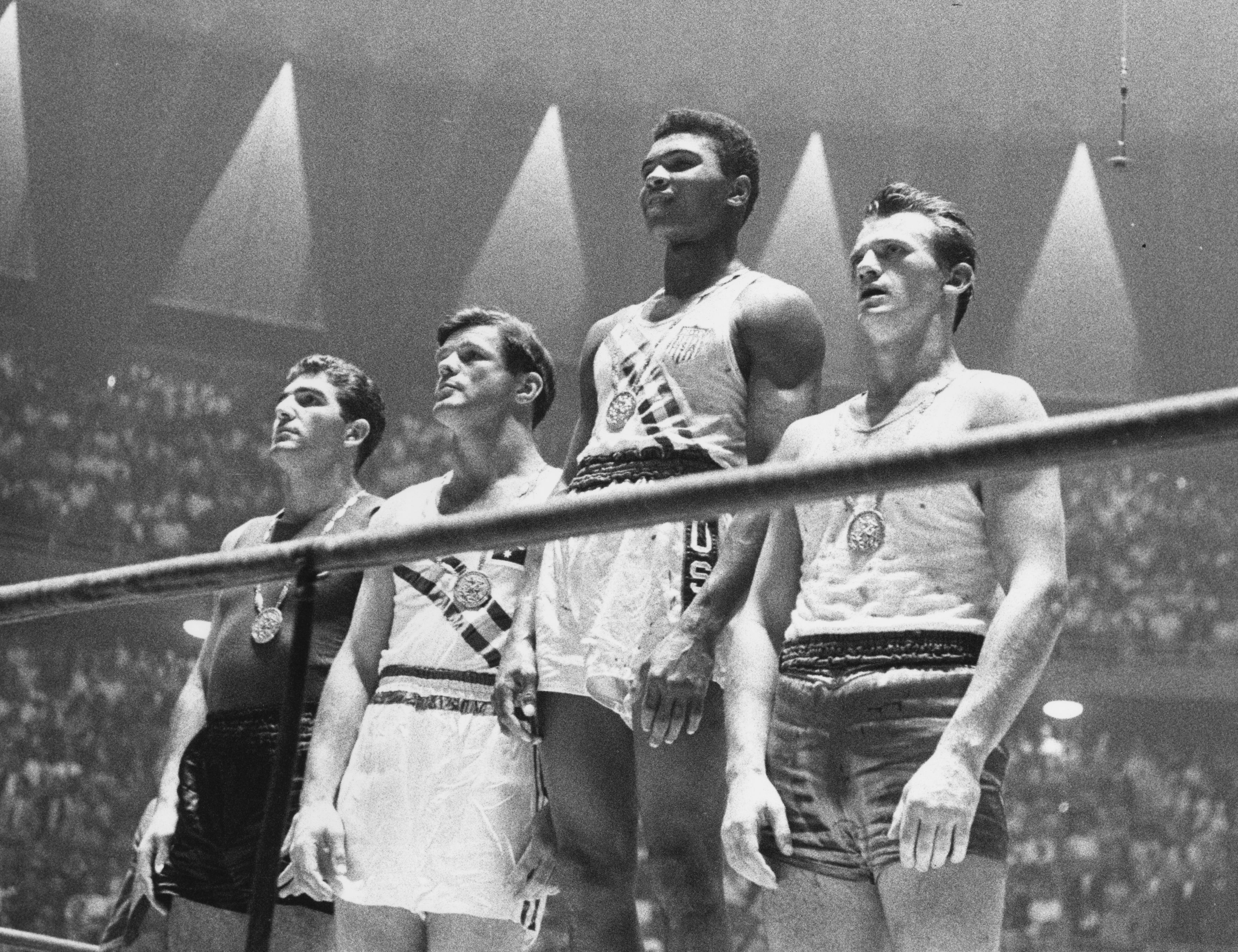
Left-right: Giulio Saraudi, Anthony Madigan, Cassius Clay, Zbigniew Pietrzykowski

Semifinals
Cassius Clay (USA)	5
Tony Madigan (AUS)	0
Giulio Saraudi (ITA)	1
Zbigniew Pietrzykowski (POL)	4

Final
Cassius Clay (USA)	5
Zbigniew Pietrzykowski (POL)	0
