= 1959 European Amateur Boxing Championships =

Boxing competitions

- Host city: Lucerne
- Country: Switzerland
- Nations: 25
- Athletes: 180
- Dates: 24–31 May

The 1959 European Amateur Boxing Championships were held in Lucerne, Switzerland from May 24 to May 31. The 13th edition of the bi-annual competition was organised by the European governing body for amateur boxing, EABA. There were 180 fighters from 25 countries participating.

== Medal winners ==
Event	Gold	Silver	Bronze
Flyweight (– 51 kilograms)	Manfred Homberg; West Germany	Gyula Török; Hungary	(Republic of Ireland) Adam McClean; Ireland Vladimir Stolnikov; Soviet Union
Bantamweight (– 54 kilograms)	Horst Rascher; West Germany	Oleg Grigoryev; Soviet Union	Zygmunt Zawadzki; Poland (Socialist Federal Republic of Yugoslavia) Miodrag Mitrović; Yugoslavia
Featherweight (– 57 kilograms)	Jerzy Adamski; Poland	Peter Goschka; West Germany	André Iuncker; France Orhan Tuş; Turkey
Lightweight (– 60 kilograms)	Olli Mäki; Finland	Demitar Velinov; Bulgaria	Ferenc Kellner; Hungary Iosif Mihalic; Romania
Light Welterweight (– 63.5 kilograms)	Vladimir Yengibaryan; Soviet Union	Piero Brandi; Italy	Rupert König; Austria István Juhász; Hungary
Welterweight (– 67 kilograms)	Leszek Drogosz; Poland	Carmelo Bossi; Italy	Bruno Guse; East Germany (Republic of Ireland) Harry Perry; Ireland
Light Middleweight (– 71 kilograms)	Nino Benvenuti; Italy	Henryk Dampc; Poland	(Socialist Federal Republic of Yugoslavia) Dragoslav Jakovljević; Yugoslavia Rolf Caroli; East Germany
Middleweight (– 75 kilograms)	Gennadi Shatkov; Soviet Union	Tadeusz Walasek; Poland	(Republic of Ireland) Colm McCoy; Ireland Harry Scott; England
Light Heavyweight (– 81 kilograms)	Zbigniew Pietrzykowski; Poland	Gheorghe Negrea; Romania	Leonid Senkin; Soviet Union Giulio Saraudi; Italy
Heavyweight (+ 81 kilograms)	Andrey Abramov; Soviet Union	Dave Thomas; England	Wladysław Jędrzejewski; Poland Josef Němec; Czechoslovakia

== Medal table ==
Rank	Nation	Gold	Silver	Bronze	Total
1	Poland (POL)	3	2	2	7
2	Soviet Union (URS)	3	1	2	6
3	West Germany (FRG)	2	1	0	3
4	Italy (ITA)	1	2	1	4
5	Finland (FIN)	1	0	0	1
6	Hungary (HUN)	0	1	2	3
7	England (ENG)	0	1	1	2
7	Romania (ROU)	0	1	1	2
9	Bulgaria (BUL)	0	1	0	1
10	Ireland (IRL)	0	0	3	3
11	East Germany (GDR)	0	0	2	2
11	Yugoslavia (YUG)	0	0	2	2
13	Austria (AUT)	0	0	1	1
13	Czechoslovakia (TCH)	0	0	1	1
13	France (FRA)	0	0	1	1
13	Turkey (TUR)	0	0	1	1
Totals (16 entries)		10	10	20	40
