= Emil Schulz =

German boxer (1938–2010)

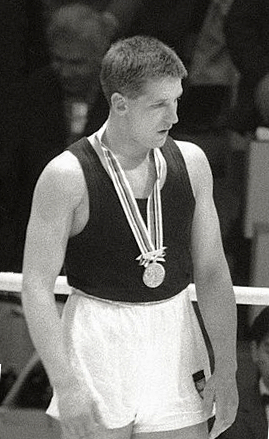
- Emil Schulz at the 1964 Olympics

Personal information
- Born: 25 May 1938 Kaiserslautern, Rheinland-Pfalz, Nazi Germany
- Died: 22 March 2010 (aged 71) Kaiserslautern, Rheinland-Pfalz, Germany
- Height: 1.78 m (5 ft 10 in)
- Weight: 75 kg (165 lb)

Sport
- Sport: Boxing
- Club: 1. FC Kaiserslautern
Medal record
Representing Germany
Olympic Games
Silver medal – second place	1964 Tokyo	Middleweight
Representing West Germany
European Championships
Bronze medal – third place	1963 Moscow	Middleweight

Emil Schulz (25 May 1938 – 22 March 2010) was a German amateur boxer and five-time national champion, who lost only 21 of his 223 fights. He competed for the United Team of Germany at the 1964 Olympics in the middleweight division and won a silver medal. He also won a bronze medal at the 1963 European Amateur Boxing Championships, representing West Germany.

== Early life ==
Schulz was born on 25 May 1938 in Kaiserslautern. He began boxing as a teenager in 1951.

== Career ==
He developed quickly and in 1956 he became the first Southwest champion of Germany, retaining this title until 1964. In 1960 Schulz first boxed internationally as part of the German Amateur Boxing Association (Deutscher Amateur Box Verband, DABV). In his first bout, he lost to Souleymane Diallo, a future professional boxer, then to Soviet Evgeny Feofanov by a knockout, but beat another Soviet and the future Olympic champion Valery Popenchenko.

In November 1960 Schulz won his first German championship in Cologne, in the middleweight division, beating Paul Hogh from Stuttgart in the final on points. In 1961 he won in another points victory over Norbert Treiber. He then fought at the 1961 European Amateur Boxing Championships with a first round knockout victory over J. Mammers from the Netherlands. In the quarterfinals, he faced Dragoslav Jakovljevic and lost by a narrow points decision, thus finishing in 5th place.

In 1962 Schulz won in Iserlohn with a single-point victory over the German Norbert Weinrauter, the middleweight champion. As there were no international championships this year the next time Schulz fought was in an international match at Munich, between the Federal Republic of Germany and Poland. Schulz managed a points victory over the reigning European champion Tadeusz Walasek, in the middleweight division.

On 4 May 1963 Schulz won a one-point victory in Freiburg over Ewald Wichert from Hamburg, his fourth consecutive title. During the subsequent European Championship in Moscow, he again met J. Mammers, winning by a second-round knockout. In the quarterfinals he claimed another knockout victory over Bernd Anders, but lost to Ion Monea from Romania on points in the semifinals, and thus finished third.

In 1964 Schulz won the German championship again with another points victory over Ewald Wichert and qualified for the United Team of Germany Olympic team with another victory over the East German champion Bernd Anders, for the Tokyo Olympics. At the Tokyo Olympics, Schulz won his first bout, knocking out the 1964 ABA Middleweight Champion William Stack after 46 seconds. He won his second and third bouts on points, but in the final lost to Valery Popenchenko.

== Later life and death ==
In the spring of 1965, Emil Schulz became seriously ill and although he recovered, he never returned to the boxing ring. He died on 22 March 2010 aged 71 in Westpfalz Hospital in Kaiserslautern.
