= Daniel Bekker =

South African boxer (1932–2009)

Personal information
- Born: 9 February 1932 Dordrecht, Eastern Cape
- Died: 22 October 2009 (aged 77) Pretoria
Medal record
Men's Boxing
Representing South Africa
Olympic Games
Silver medal – second place	1960 Rome	Heavyweight
Bronze medal – third place	1956 Melbourne	Heavyweight
Commonwealth Games
Gold medal – first place	1958 Cardiff	Heavyweight

Daniel "Daan" Wepener Bekker (9 February 1932 – 22 October 2009) was a South African boxer, who won the bronze medal in the Heavyweight division (+ 91 kg) at the 1956 Summer Olympics in Melbourne, Australia. Four years later in Rome he captured the silver medal in the same category.

== Amateur career ==
Bekker was the South African Heavyweight Champion from 1955–1959 and 1961.

=== Amateur results ===
- 1956 won the Heavyweight bronze medal at the Melbourne Olympics.
  - Defeated José Giorgetti (Argentina) KO-1
  - Lost to Pete Rademacher (USA) KO-3
- 1958 won the Commonwealth Games in Cardiff, Wales.
  - Defeated S. Renaud (Canada) TKO-1
  - Defeated Gbadegesin Salawu (Nigeria) TKO-2
  - Defeated David Thomas (England) PTS
- 1960 won the Heavyweight silver medal at the Rome Olympics.
  - Defeated Władysław Jędrzejewski (Poland) TKO-1
  - Defeated Obrad Sretenovic (Yugoslavia) KO-1
  - Defeated Günter Siegmund (United Team of Germany) PTS (4-1)
  - Lost to Franco De Piccoli (Italy) KO-2

== Death ==
Bekker died on 18 October 2009 after a long struggle with Parkinson's and Alzheimer's diseases.
