= 1963 European Amateur Boxing Championships =

Boxing competitions

- Host city: Moscow
- Country: Soviet Union
- Nations: 18
- Athletes: 133
- Dates: 26 May–2 June

The 1963 European Amateur Boxing Championships were held in Moscow, Soviet Union from 26 May to 2 June. The 15th edition of the bi-annual competition was organised by the European governing body for amateur boxing, EABA. There were 133 fighters from 18 countries participating.

== Medal winners ==
Event	Gold	Silver	Bronze
Flyweight (– 51 kilograms)	Viktor Bystrov; Soviet Union	Stefan Panayotov; Bulgaria	Constantin Ciucă; Romania Paolo Vacca; Italy
Bantamweight (– 54 kilograms)	Oleg Grigoryev; Soviet Union	(Socialist Federal Republic of Yugoslavia) Branislav Petrić; Yugoslavia	Rainer Poser; East Germany Nicolae Puiu; Romania
Featherweight (– 57 kilograms)	Stanislav Stepashkin; Soviet Union	Giovanni Girgenti; Italy	Jerzy Adamski; Poland Andrei Olteanu; Romania
Lightweight (– 60 kilograms)	János Kajdi; Hungary	Boris Nikanorov; Soviet Union	Antero Halonen; Finland Giuseppe Sabri; Italy
Light Welterweight (– 63.5 kilograms)	Jerzy Kulej; Poland	Aloizs Tumiņš; Soviet Union	Bruno Arcari; Italy Gerhard Dieter; West Germany
Welterweight (– 67 kilograms)	Ričardas Tamulis; Soviet Union	Silvano Bertini; Italy	János Kálmán; Hungary Bohumil Němeček; Czechoslovakia
Light Middleweight (– 71 kilograms)	Boris Lagutin; Soviet Union	Andrew Wyper; Scotland	Virgil Badea; Romania Siegfried Olesch; East Germany
Middleweight (– 75 kilograms)	Valeriy Popenchenko; Soviet Union	Ion Monea; Romania	(Socialist Federal Republic of Yugoslavia) Dragoslav Jakovljević; Yugoslavia Emil Schulz; West Germany
Light Heavyweight (– 81 kilograms)	Zbigniew Pietrzykowski; Poland	Danas Pozniakas; Soviet Union	František Poláček; Czechoslovakia Bernard Thebault; France
Heavyweight (+ 81 kilograms)	Josef Němec; Czechoslovakia	Andrey Abramov; Soviet Union	Dante Cané; Italy Karl Degenhardt; East Germany

== Medal table ==
* Host nation (Soviet Union)

Rank	Nation	Gold	Silver	Bronze	Total
1	Soviet Union (URS)*	6	4	0	10
2	Poland (POL)	2	0	1	3
3	Czechoslovakia (TCH)	1	0	2	3
4	Hungary (HUN)	1	0	1	2
5	Italy (ITA)	0	2	4	6
6	Romania (ROU)	0	1	4	5
7	Yugoslavia (YUG)	0	1	1	2
8	Bulgaria (BUL)	0	1	0	1
8	Scotland (SCO)	0	1	0	1
10	East Germany (GDR)	0	0	3	3
11	West Germany (FRG)	0	0	2	2
12	Finland (FIN)	0	0	1	1
12	France (FRA)	0	0	1	1
Totals (13 entries)		10	10	20	40
