= Boxing at the 1960 Summer Olympics – Heavyweight =

Olympic boxing tournament

Heavyweight boxing at the Games of the XVII Olympiad
- Venue: Palazzo dello Sport
- Dates: 25 August – 5 September 1960
- Competitors: 17 from 17 nations

Medalists
1st place, gold medalist(s)		Francesco de Piccoli	Italy
2nd place, silver medalist(s)		Daniel Bekker	South Africa
3rd place, bronze medalist(s)		Josef Němec	Czechoslovakia
3rd place, bronze medalist(s)		Günter Siegmund	United Team of Germany

The men's heavyweight event was part of the boxing programme at the 1960 Summer Olympics. The weight class allowed boxers of more than 81 kilograms to compete. The competition was held from 25 August to 5 September 1960. 17 boxers from 17 nations competed.

== Competition format ==
The competition was a straight single-elimination tournament, with no bronze medal match (two bronze medals were awarded, one to each semifinal loser).

== Results ==
Results of the heavyweight boxing competition.

=== Top half ===
Round of 16		Quarterfinals		Semifinals
Josef Němec (TCH)	3
David Thomas (GBR)	2	Josef Němec (TCH)	4
Percy Price Jr. (USA)	KO-1	Percy Price Jr. (USA)	1
Ron Taylor (AUS)	L			Josef Němec (TCH)	1
Andrey Abramov (URS)	KO-1			Francesco de Piccoli (ITA)	4
Manuel García (ESP)	L	Andrey Abramov (URS)	0
Francesco de Piccoli (ITA)	W	Francesco de Piccoli (ITA)	5
Willy Venneman (BEL)	AB

=== Bottom half ===
Round of 32
Joe Casey (IRL)	1
Obrad Sretenović (YUG)	4

Round of 16
Günter Siegmund (EUA)	KO-3
Max Bösiger (SUI)	L
Joseph Syoz (FRA)	0
Vasile Mariuţan (ROU)	5
Daniel Bekker (RSA)	KO-1
Władysław Jędrzejewski (POL)	L
Eduardo Corletti (ARG)	1
Obrad Sretenović (YUG)	4

Quarter-finals
Günter Siegmund (EUA)	5
Vasile Mariuţan (ROU)	0
Daniel Bekker (RSA)	KO-1
Obrad Sretenović (YUG)	L

Semi-finals
Günter Siegmund (EUA)	1
Daniel Bekker (RSA)	4

=== Finals ===
Semifinals
Josef Němec (TCH)	1
Francesco de Piccoli (ITA)	4
Günter Siegmund (EUA)	1
Daniel Bekker (RSA)	4

Final
Francesco de Piccoli (ITA)	KO-1
Daniel Bekker (RSA)	L
