= Gerald Collins (disambiguation) =

Gerald Collins (1932–2003) was an Australian rules footballer.

Gerald Collins may also refer to:

- Gerald Collins (American football) (born 1971), American football player
- Gerald Collins (boxer) (1933–2008), Canadian boxer

== See also ==
- Gerry Collins (disambiguation)
