= Boxing at the 1960 Summer Olympics – Middleweight =

Olympic boxing tournament

Middleweight boxing at the Games of the XVII Olympiad
- Venue: Palazzo dello Sport
- Dates: 26 August – 5 September 1960
- Competitors: 25 from 25 nations

Medalists
1st place, gold medalist(s)		Eddie Crook, Jr.	United States
2nd place, silver medalist(s)		Tadeusz Walasek	Poland
3rd place, bronze medalist(s)		Yevgeny Feofanov	Soviet Union
3rd place, bronze medalist(s)		Ion Monea	Romania

The men's middleweight event was part of the boxing programme at the 1960 Summer Olympics in Rome, Italy. The weight class allowed boxers of up to 75 kilograms to compete. The competition was held from 26 August to 5 September 1960. A total of 25 boxers from 25 nations competed.

== Competition format ==
The competition was a straight single-elimination tournament, with no bronze medal match (two bronze medals were awarded, one to each semifinal loser).

== Results ==
Results of the middleweight boxing competition.

=== Top half ===
Round of 32
Fidel Odreman (VEN)	L
Eddie Crook, Jr. (USA)	KO-1

Round of 16
Ion Monea (ROU)	5
Vasil Paparizov (BUL)	0
Roy Addison (GBR)	1
Hans Büchi (SUI)	4
Milo Sarens (BEL)	1
Chang Lo-pu (ROC)	4
Peter Odhiambo (UGA)	0
Eddie Crook, Jr. (USA)	5

Quarterfinals
Ion Monea (ROU)	KO-1
Hans Büchi (SUI)	L
Chang Lo-pu (ROC)	L
Eddie Crook, Jr. (USA)	KO-3

Semifinals
Ion Monea (ROU)	L
Eddie Crook, Jr. (USA)	KO-2

=== Bottom half ===
Round of 32
Moustafa Ben Lahbib (MAR)	0
Luigi Napoleoni (ITA)	5
Eberhard Radzik (EUA)	L
Moussa El-Gelidi (UAR)	KO-2
Carlos Lucas (CHI)	4
Rodolfo Loza (ARG)	1
Yevgeny Feofanov (URS)	5
Yoland Levèque (FRA)	0
Sultan Mahmoud (PAK)	0
Tadeusz Walasek (POL)	5
Teifion Davies (AUS)	3
Achton Mikkelsen (DEN)	2
Eamonn McKeon (IRL)	5
Mohamed Ben Gandoubi (TUN)	0
Egon Rusch (AUT)	0
Frik van Rooyen (RSA)	5

Round of 16
Luigi Napoleoni (ITA)	5
Moussa El-Gelidi (UAR)	0
Carlos Lucas (CHI)	L
Yevgeny Feofanov (URS)	KO-2
Tadeusz Walasek (POL)	5
Teifion Davies (AUS)	0
Eamonn McKeon (IRL)	0
Frik van Rooyen (RSA)	5

Quarter-finals
Luigi Napoleoni (ITA)	L
Yevgeny Feofanov (URS)	KO-2
Tadeusz Walasek (POL)	5
Frik van Rooyen (RSA)	0

Semi-finals
Yevgeny Feofanov (URS)	1
Tadeusz Walasek (POL)	4

=== Finals ===
Semifinals
Ion Monea (ROU)	L
Eddie Crook, Jr. (USA)	KO-2
Yevgeny Feofanov (URS)	1
Tadeusz Walasek (POL)	4

Final
Eddie Crook, Jr. (USA)	3
Tadeusz Walasek (POL)	2
