= Steaua București =

Steaua or Steaua București may refer to:

== Sports ==
=== Clubs ===
- CSA Steaua București, a Romanian multi-sports club, or one of their sections:
  - CSA Steaua București (athletics)
  - CSA Steaua București (basketball)
  - CSA Steaua București (boxing)
  - CSA Steaua București (canoe-kayak)
  - CSA Steaua București (fencing)
  - CSA Steaua București (football), the football team of the multi-sports club
  - CSA Steaua București (handball)
  - CSA Steaua București (rugby union)
  - CSA Steaua București (volleyball)
  - Steaua București Hockey, also known as Steaua Rangers
- FCSB, a football club formerly named FC Steaua București

=== Venues ===
- Complexul Sportiv Steaua, a sports complex in Bucharest, Romania
- Stadionul Steaua (1974), a football stadium in Bucharest, Romania, demolished in 2018
- Steaua Stadium (2021), a multi-purpose stadium in Bucharest, Romania

== Places ==
- Steaua, Timișoara, a residential district in Timișoara, Romania
