= Percy Price Jr. =

American boxer

Percy J. Price Jr.
Personal information
- Nationality: American
- Born: May 19, 1936 Salem, New Jersey, United States
- Died: January 12, 1989 (aged 52) Jacksonville, North Carolina, United States

Sport
- Sport: Boxing
Medal record
Representing the United States
World Military Championships
Silver medal – second place	1960 Wiesbaden	Heavyweight

Percy J. Price Jr. (May 19, 1936 – January 12, 1989) was an American amateur boxer. A United States Marine at the time, he competed in the men's heavyweight event at the 1960 Summer Olympics. He gained his place on the U.S. team by defeating Harry Epsey in the Olympic Trials. In his first Olympic bout Price defeated Ron Taylor of Australia but lost to Josef Němec of Czechoslovakia in the quarter-finals.

After seven-year hiatus, Marine Staff Sgt. Percy Price, age 33, returned to the ring to win the Armed Forces Boxing Championships at the Philadelphia Sports Arena. In front of a capacity crowd including world heavyweight champion Joe Frazier, Price, 222, won a three-round decision over 20-years Duane Bobick, 199. After the bout, Price, father of six, announced he would never fight again.

Price turned down offers of a professional career and remained in the Marine Corps until he retired in 1976. However, he won numerous military boxing titles, and also completed two full combat tours of duty in South Vietnam as a Marine platoon leader.
