= Joe Casey (disambiguation) =

Joe Casey is an American comic book writer. Other people with the same name include:

- Joe Casey (singer) (born 1977), American musician
- Joe Casey (catcher) (1887–1966), baseball player
- Joe Casey (pitcher) (1900–1987), baseball player
- Joe Casey (boxer) (1937–2009), Irish boxer

== See also ==
- Joseph Casey (disambiguation)
