= James Montgomery (boxer) =

Canadian boxer

Personal information
- Nationality: Canadian
- Born: 26 December 1934
- Died: 13 February 2015 (aged 80)

Sport
- Sport: Boxing

James Montgomery (26 December 1934 – 13 February 2015) was a Canadian boxer. He competed in the men's light middleweight event at the 1956 Summer Olympics. A native of Montreal, he played for the Verdun Shamcats of the Quebec Senior Football League in the late 1950s and early 1960s. At the 1956 Summer Olympics, he lost to Ulrich Kienast of West Germany.

Montgomery's son Jim is a former ice hockey player who is now a National Hockey League coach.
