= Feofanov =

Feofanov (Russian: Феофанов) is a Russian masculine surname originating from the given name Feofan, its feminine counterpart is Feofanova. It may refer to

- Aleksandr Feofanov (born 1976), Russian football player
- Svetlana Feofanova (born 1980), Russian pole vaulter
- Yevgeny Feofanov (1937–2000), Soviet boxer
