= Andrey Abramov =

Andrey Abramov may refer to:

- Andrey Abramov (archer) (born 1984), Russian archer
- Andrey Abramov (boxer) (1935–1995), Soviet Russian boxer
