= Matti Aho =

Finnish boxer

Personal information
- Nationality: Finnish
- Born: Matti Olavi Aho; 29 May 1934; Kanneljärvi, Finland (now Russia)
- Died: 23 February 1984 (aged 49); Helsinki, Finland

Sport
- Sport: Boxing

Matti Olavi Aho (29 May 1934 – 23 February 1984) was a Finnish boxer. He competed in the men's light heavyweight event at the 1960 Summer Olympics.

== Career ==
At the 1960 Summer Olympics, he defeated Colm McCoy of Ireland in the Round of 32, before losing to Petar Spasov of Bulgaria in the Round of 16.

Besides his Olympic appearance, Aho earned a heavyweight bronze medal at the 1961 Nordic Championships and won the Finnish championship five times—light-heavyweight in 1956, 1958, and 1960, and heavyweight in 1957 and 1961. He also took light-heavyweight bronze at the 1955 Finnish Championships.
