= CSA Steaua București (boxing) =

Romanian boxing team

- Full name: Clubul Sportiv al Armatei Steaua București
- Nickname: Roș-Albaștrii (The Red and Blues)
- Founded: 1947; 79 years ago
- Based in: Bucharest, Romania
- Colors
- President: George Boroi
- Website: Club home page

The CSA Steaua București Boxing section was created in 1947 and is one of the most successful boxing teams in Romania.

== Achievements ==
Competition	Gold	Silver	Bronze	Total
Summer Olympic Games	0	3	2	5
World Championships	0	4	3	7
European Championships	5	14	16	35
World Universiade Summer Games	1	2	1	4
World Championships CISM	0	0	1	1
Military Summer Spartakiad	4	5	22	31
Balkan Games	23	21	7	51

Competition		Winner
Romanian Championships	Seniors	162
Romanian Championships	Youths	17
Romanian Championships	Juniors	18
Romanian Cup		8

== European champions ==
Year	Category	Name
1957	–81 kg	Gheorghe Negrea
1967	–54 kg	Nicolae Gîju
1969	–51 kg	Constantin Ciucă
1972	–51 kg	Dinu Condurat
1973	–51 kg	Constantin Gruescu

== Notable boxers ==
- (Romania) Vasile Tiță
- (Romania) Gheorghe Fiat
- (Romania) Mircea Dobrescu
- (Romania) Gheorghe Negrea
- (Romania) Alec Năstac
- (Romania) Dumitru Șchiopu
- (Romania) Viorel Simion

== Notable coaches ==
- (Romania) Gheorghe Fiat
