= Saerens =

Saerens is a surname. Notable people with the surname include:

- Émile Saerens (1937–2020), Belgian boxer
- Maibritt Saerens (born 1970), Danish actress
