= Franco Scisciani =

Italian boxer (1934–2018)

Personal information
- Nationality: Italian
- Born: 8 January 1934; Rome, Italy
- Died: 9 March 2018 (aged 84); Rome, Italy

Sport
- Sport: Boxing

Franco Scisciani (8 January 1934 – 9 March 2018) was an Italian boxer. He competed in the men's light middleweight event at the 1956 Summer Olympics. At the 1956 Summer Olympics, he defeated Eugène Legrand of France, before losing to José Torres of the United States. Scisciani died in Rome on 9 March 2018, at the age of 84.
