= Boxing at the 1956 Summer Olympics – Light heavyweight =

Olympic boxing tournament

Light heavyweight boxing at the Games of the XVI Olympiad
- Venue: West Melbourne Stadium
- Dates: 23 November – 1 December 1956
- Competitors: 11 from 11 nations

Medalists
1st place, gold medalist(s)		James Boyd	United States
2nd place, silver medalist(s)		Gheorghe Negrea	Romania
3rd place, bronze medalist(s)		Carlos Lucas	Chile
3rd place, bronze medalist(s)		Romualdas Murauskas	Soviet Union

The men's light heavyweight event was part of the boxing programme at the 1956 Summer Olympics. The weight class was allowed boxers of up to 81 kilograms to compete. The competition was held from 23 November to 1 December 1956. 11 boxers from 11 nations competed.

== Medalists ==
Gold	James Boyd; United States
Silver	Gheorghe Negrea; Romania
Bronze	Carlos Lucas; Chile
Bronze	Romualdas Murauskas; Soviet Union

== Results ==
=== First round ===
- Andrzej Wojciechowski (POL) def. Lennart Risberg (SWE), RSC-3
- Gheorghe Negrea (ROU) def. Piet van Vuuren (SAF), PTS
- Ottavio Panunzi (ITA) def. Gerald Collins (CAN), PTS

=== Quarterfinals ===
- Romualdas Murauskas (URS) def. Anthony Madigan (AUS), PTS
- James Boyd (USA) def. Rodolfo Díaz (ARG), PTS
- Carlos Lucas (CHI) def. Andrzej Wojciechowski (POL), PTS
- Gheorghe Negrea (ROU) def. Ottavio Panunzi (ITA), PTS

=== Semifinals ===
- James Boyd (USA) def. Romualdas Murauskas (URS), PTS
- Gheorghe Negrea (ROU) def. Carlos Lucas (CHI), PTS

=== Final ===
- James Boyd (USA) def. Gheorghe Negrea (ROU), PTS
