= Manuel García (boxer) =

Spanish boxer (born 1935)

Personal information
- Full name: Manuel García González
- Nationality: Spanish
- Born: 15 May 1935 Barcelona, Spain
- Died: 2013 (aged 77–78)

Sport
- Sport: Boxing

Manuel García González (15 May 1935 – 2013) was a Spanish boxer. He competed in the men's heavyweight event at the 1960 Summer Olympics. At the 1960 Summer Olympics in Rome, he lost to Andrey Abramov of the Soviet Union in the Round of 16 after receiving a bye in the Round of 32.
