= Ian MacKenzie =

Ian MacKenzie or McKenzie may refer to:

- Ian Alistair Mackenzie (1890–1949), Canadian parliamentarian
- Ian MacKenzie (swimmer) (born 1953), Canadian former swimmer
- Iain McKenzie (born 1959), Scottish Labour politician
- Ian Mackenzie-Kerr (1929–2005), British book designer
- Ian Clayton Mackenzie (1909–2009), British diplomat
- Ian MacKenzie (footballer) (1950–2018), English footballer
- Ian McKenzie (boxer), Scottish boxer
