= Tony Madigan =

Australian boxer (1930–2017)

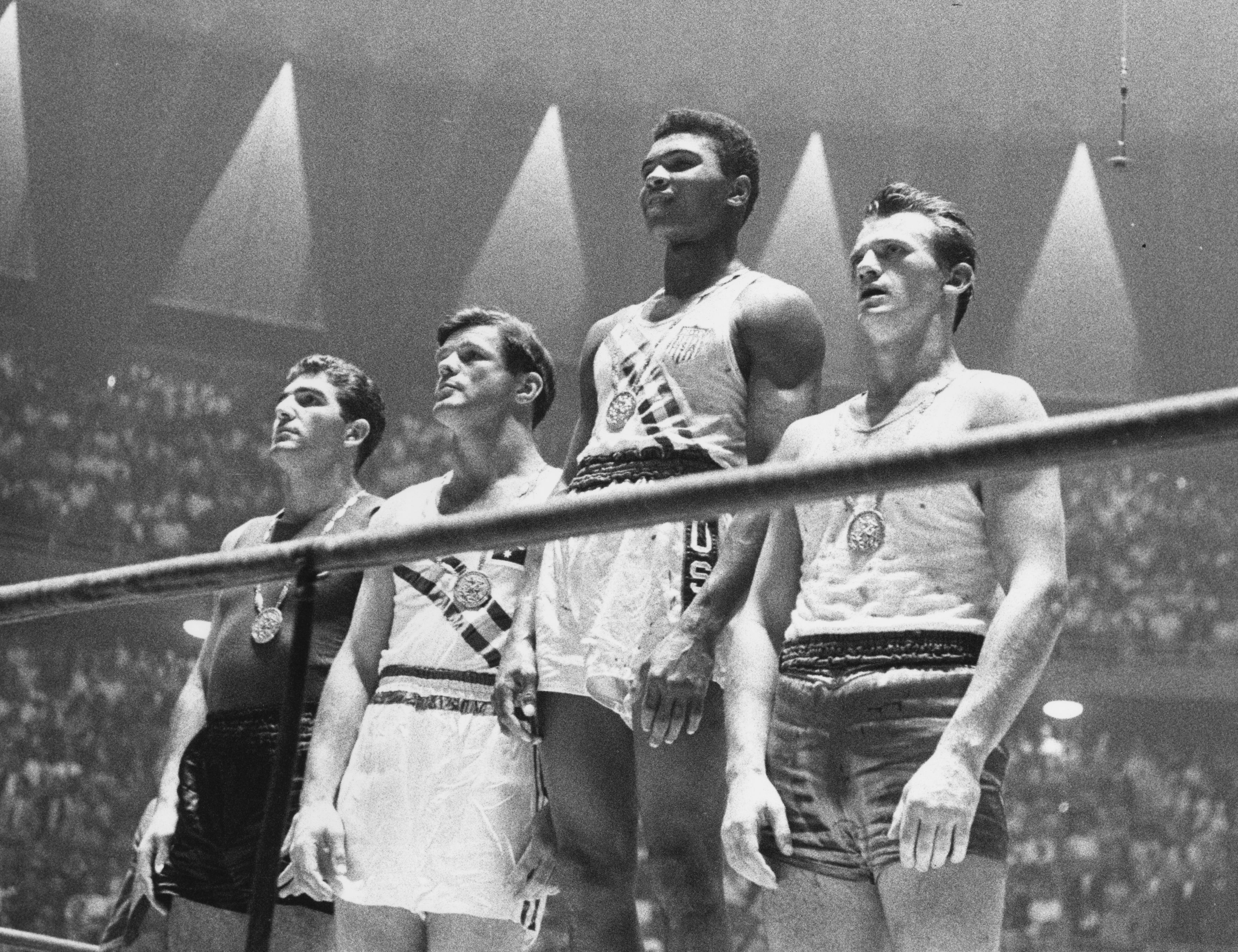
- 1960 Olympic light heavyweight podium. Left-right: Giulio Saraudi, Tony Madigan, Cassius Clay and Zbigniew Pietrzykowski.

Personal information
- Born: 4 February 1930 Sydney, Australia
- Died: 29 October 2017 (aged 87) France
- Height: 1.85 m (6 ft 1 in)
- Weight: 80 kg (180 lb)

Sport
- Sport: Boxing
Medal record
Representing Australia
Olympic Games
Bronze medal – third place	1960 Rome	Light heavyweight
British Empire and Commonwealth Games
Silver medal – second place	1954 Vancouver	Light heavyweight
Gold medal – first place	1958 Cardiff	Light heavyweight
Gold medal – first place	1962 Perth	Light heavyweight

Antony Morgan Madigan (4 February 1930 – 29 October 2017) was an Australian boxer and rugby player. He competed in boxing at the 1952, 1956 and 1960 Olympics and finished in fifth, fifth and third place, respectively. In 1960 Madigan lost his semi-final to Muhammad Ali. He also won medals at three Commonwealth Games in the light-heavyweight division – a silver in 1954 and gold in 1958 and 1962.

Tony was the 2010 Inductee for the Australian National Boxing Hall of Fame Veterans category.

== Biography ==
Madigan's father Kendall Morgan Madigan (1908–1938) was a doctor and mother Elsie Maud Loydstrom (1911–1983) was a dentist. He has a younger brother Mark. His father died in 1938 as a result of cancer. Madigan grew up in Bathurst and Maitland before his mother moved to Sydney to work as a dentist.

Madigan attended Waverley College in Sydney where he took boxing lessons with Australian champion Hughie Dwyer and sparred with leading professional boxers. In the 1950s, he spent time in the United States being coached by leading trainer Cus D'Amato. After returning to Australia, he sold EH Holdens with rugby league player Rex Mossop.

On 17 January 1955, Madigan suffered serious injuries in a car crash in Bavaria, West Germany. His 23-year-old passenger Helen Stokes-Smith was killed when on an icy road Madigan lost control when trying to avoid a parked truck.

Madigan married a German psychotherapist, Sybille, in November 1960 and their son Kendall Morgan Madigan was born in August 1961. Madigan is also father to a daughter, Elizabeth Phy Collins who was born in NYC in 1960.

In the mid-1960s, Madigan sold property investments and had a successful modeling career in London. He then moved to New York City and commenced modeling with Howard Zieff, a renowned photographer.

== Rugby union ==
Madigan played rugby union for Randwick Rugby Club (14 first-grade matches, two tries, 1950) and Eastern Suburbs Rugby Club (1951, 1957 and 1963). Outside Australia, he played Harlequins Rugby (1953) in London and Westchester Rugby Club (1960–1962) in New York. In 1960, he represented the United States Eastern Rugby Union against Quebec Province in Montreal. Madigan generally played as a flyhalf for the Westchester Rugby Club but did play breakaway against Quebec Province in Montreal in the 1962 representative game.

== Boxing ==
Major amateur competitions

Year	Competition	Division	Results	Medal
1952	Olympic Games, 1952 Helsinki	Middleweight	Rd 1 – Bye; Rd 2 defeated Boris Siljtshev Soviet Union 2–1; Rd 3 lost Stig Sjölin Sweden 0–3	
1954	British Empire and Commonwealth Games, 1954 Vancouver	Light Heavyweight	Rd 1 – defeated Bill Misslebrook Canada technical knockout 1st round; Gold medal bout – lost Piet van Vuuren South Africa on points decision	2nd place, silver medalist(s)
1956	Olympic Games, 1956 Melbourne	Light Heavyweight	Rd 1 – Bye; Quarter-final – lost Romualdas Murauskas Soviet Union points decision	
1958	British Empire and Commonwealth Games, 1958 Cardiff	Light Heavyweight	Rd ; Gold medal bout – defeated Robert Higgins Wales points decision	1st place, gold medalist(s)
1960	Olympic Games, 1960 Rome	Light Heavyweight	Rd 1 – Bye; Rd 2 – defeated Lars-Olof Norling Sweden 5 – 0; Quarter-final – defeated Gheorghe Negrea Romania by 2nd round Knockout; Semi-final – lost to Cassius Clay United States 0–5	3rd place, bronze medalist(s)
1962	British Empire and Commonwealth Games, 1962 Perth	Light Heavyweight	Rd 1 – defeated Dave Paley Wales referee stopped bout; Quarter-final – defeated Ronald Holmes Jamaica by disqualification; Semi-final – defeated Hans Christie Northern Ireland referee stopped bout in 2nd round; Gold medal bout – defeated Jojo Miles Ghana points decision	1st place, gold medalist(s)

=== Recognition ===
- 1962 – Australian flag bearer at the 1962 British Empire and Commonwealth Games
- 2000 – Australian Sports Medal
- 2010 – Australian National Boxing Hall of Fame
