= 1957 European Amateur Boxing Championships =

Boxing competitions

- Host city: Prague
- Country: Czechoslovakia
- Nations: 21
- Athletes: 149
- Dates: 25 May–2 June

The 1957 European Amateur Boxing Championships were held in Prague, Czechoslovakia, from May 25 to June 2. The 12th edition of the bi-annual competition was organised by the European governing body for amateur boxing, EABA. There were 149 fighters from 21 countries participating.

== Medal winners ==
Event	Gold	Silver	Bronze
Flyweight (– 51 kilograms)	Manfred Homberg; West Germany	Mircea Dobrescu; Romania	Peter Davies; Wales René Libeer; France
Bantamweight (– 54 kilograms)	Oleg Grigoryev; Soviet Union	Gianfranco Piovesani; Italy	Peter Goschka; West Germany Johnny Morrisey; Scotland
Featherweight (– 57 kilograms)	Dimitar Velinov; Bulgaria	Mario Sitri; Italy	Kazimierz Boczarski; Poland Vladimir Safronov; Soviet Union
Lightweight (– 60 kilograms)	Kazimierz Paździor; Poland	Olli Mäki; Finland	John Kidd; Scotland Horst Herper; West Germany
Light Welterweight (– 63.5 kilograms)	Vladimir Yengibaryan; Soviet Union	Walter Ivanus; Czechoslovakia	Zygmunt Milewski; Poland (Socialist Federal Republic of Yugoslavia) Ilija Lukić; Yugoslavia
Welterweight (– 67 kilograms)	Manfred Grauss; West Germany	Leopold Potesil; Austria	Yuri Gromov; Soviet Union (Republic of Ireland) Fred Tiedt; Ireland
Light Middleweight (– 71 kilograms)	Nino Benvenuti; Italy	Tadeusz Walasek; Poland	Rolf Caroli; East Germany Ivan Sobolev; Soviet Union
Middleweight (– 75 kilograms)	Zbigniew Pietrzykowski; Poland	(Socialist Federal Republic of Yugoslavia) Dragoslav Jakovljević; Yugoslavia	Paul Nickel; East Germany Karl Schoenberg; West Germany
Light Heavyweight (– 81 kilograms)	Gheorghe Negrea; Romania	Petar Stankov; Bulgaria	Zdenek Cipro; Czechoslovakia Laszlo Csabajszky; Hungary
Heavyweight (+ 81 kilograms)	Andrey Abramov; Soviet Union	Vasile Mariutan; Romania	Josef Němec; Czechoslovakia (Socialist Federal Republic of Yugoslavia) Branislav Davidović; Yugoslavia

== Medal table ==
Rank	Nation	Gold	Silver	Bronze	Total
1	Soviet Union (URS)	3	0	3	6
2	Poland (POL)	2	1	2	5
3	West Germany (FRG)	2	0	3	5
4	Italy (ITA)	1	2	0	3
4	Romania (ROU)	1	2	0	3
6	Bulgaria (BUL)	1	1	0	2
7	Czechoslovakia (TCH)	0	1	2	3
7	Yugoslavia (YUG)	0	1	2	3
9	Austria (AUT)	0	1	0	1
9	Finland (FIN)	0	1	0	1
11	East Germany (GDR)	0	0	2	2
11	Scotland (SCO)	0	0	2	2
13	France (FRA)	0	0	1	1
13	Hungary (HUN)	0	0	1	1
13	Ireland (IRL)	0	0	1	1
13	Wales (WAL)	0	0	1	1
Totals (16 entries)		10	10	20	40
