= Napoleoni =

Napoleoni is an Italian surname. Notable people with the surname include:

- Loretta Napoleoni (born 1955), Italian journalist and political analyst
- Luigi Napoleoni (1937–2021), Italian boxer
- Stefano Napoleoni (born 1986), Italian footballer
