= José Leite =

Brazilian boxer

Personal information
- Born: 11 February 1938 (age 87); Minas Gerais, Brazil

Sport
- Sport: Boxing

José Leite (born 11 February 1938) is a Brazilian boxer. He competed in the men's light heavyweight event at the 1960 Summer Olympics. At the 1960 Summer Olympics, he lost to Rafael Gargiulo of Argentina.
