= Günter Siegmund =

German boxer (1936–2020)

Medal record

Men's Boxing

Representing Germany

Olympic Games
| Bronze medal – third place | 1960 Rome | Heavyweight |

Representing East Germany

European Amateur Championships
| Bronze medal – third place | 1961 Belgrade | Heavyweight |

Günter Siegmund (19 December 1936 – 13 September 2020) was an East German heavyweight boxer who won the bronze medal in international competitions in both 1960 and 1961.

He competed for the SC Dynamo Berlin / Sportvereinigung (SV) Dynamo.

== 1960 Olympic results ==
Below are the results of Gunter Siegmund, an East German heavyweight boxer who competed at the 1960 Rome Olympics:

- Round of 32: bye
- Round of 16: defeated Max Bösiger (Switzerland)
- Quarterfinal: defeated Vasile Mariuţan (Romania)
- Semifinal: lost to Daniel Bekker (South Africa) (was awarded a bronze medal)
