= 1961 European Amateur Boxing Championships =

Boxing competitions

- Host city: Belgrade
- Country: Yugoslavia
- Nations: 21
- Athletes: 146
- Dates: 3–10 June

The 1961 European Amateur Boxing Championships were held in Belgrade, Yugoslavia from 3 to 10 June. The 14th edition of the bi-annual competition was organised by the European governing body for amateur boxing, EABA. There were 146 fighters from 21 countries participating.

== Medal winners ==
Event	Gold	Silver	Bronze
Flyweight (– 51 kilograms)	Paolo Vacca; Italy	Vladimir Stolnikov; Soviet Union	Otto Babiasch; East Germany Fritz Chervet; Switzerland
Bantamweight (– 54 kilograms)	Sergei Sivko; Soviet Union	Piotr Gutman; Poland	Nicolae Puiu; Romania Primo Zamparini; Italy
Featherweight (– 57 kilograms)	Francis Taylor; England	Aleksei Zasukhin; Soviet Union	Constantin Georghiu; Romania Karl-Heinz Schulz; East Germany
Lightweight (– 60 kilograms)	Richard McTaggart; Scotland	(Socialist Federal Republic of Yugoslavia) Petar Benedek; Yugoslavia	János Kajdi; Hungary Paul Warwick; England
Light Welterweight (– 63.5 kilograms)	Aloizs Tumiņš; Soviet Union	(Socialist Federal Republic of Yugoslavia) Ljubiša Mehović; Yugoslavia	Pierre Cosentino; France Marian Kasprzyk; Poland
Welterweight (– 67 kilograms)	Ričardas Tamulis; Soviet Union	Max Meier; Switzerland	Jean Josselin; France Ian McKenzie; Scotland
Light Middleweight (– 71 kilograms)	Boris Lagutin; Soviet Union	Hans-Dieter Neidel; East Germany	Virgil Badea; Romania Eric Schichta; West Germany
Middleweight (– 75 kilograms)	Tadeusz Walasek; Poland	Yevgeny Feofanov; Soviet Union	Franz Frauenlob; Austria (Socialist Federal Republic of Yugoslavia) Dragoslav Jakovljevic; Yugoslavia
Light Heavyweight (– 81 kilograms)	Giulio Saraudi; Italy	Gheorghe Negrea; Romania	Jack Bodell; England Zdzisław Józefowicz; Poland
Heavyweight (+ 81 kilograms)	Andrey Abramov; Soviet Union	Benito Penna; Italy	Zbigniew Gugniewicz; Poland Günter Siegmund; East Germany

== Medal table ==
* Host nation (Yugoslavia)

Rank	Nation	Gold	Silver	Bronze	Total
1	Soviet Union (URS)	5	3	0	8
2	Italy (ITA)	2	1	4	7
3	Poland (POL)	1	1	3	5
4	England (ENG)	1	0	2	3
5	Scotland (SCO)	1	0	1	2
6	Yugoslavia (YUG)*	0	2	1	3
7	East Germany (GDR)	0	1	3	4
7	Romania (ROU)	0	1	3	4
9	Switzerland (SUI)	0	1	1	2
10	France (FRA)	0	0	2	2
11	Austria (AUT)	0	0	1	1
11	Hungary (HUN)	0	0	1	1
11	West Germany (FRG)	0	0	1	1
Totals (13 entries)		10	10	23	43
