= Norling =

Norling is a Swedish surname. Notable people with the surname include:

- Anders Norling (born 1956), Swedish Olympic swimmer
- Axel Norling (1884–1964), Swedish gymnast, diver, and tug of war competitor
- Bengt Norling (1925–2002), Swedish politician
- Clive Norling, Welsh international rugby union referee
- Daniel Norling (1888–1958), Swedish gymnast and equestrian, brother of Axel
- Figge Norling (born 1965), Swedish actor and theatre director
- Katrin Norling (born 1979), Swedish Olympic equestrian
- Lars-Olof Norling (born 1935), Swedish Olympic boxer
- Lisa Norling, American historian
- Rikard Norling (born 1971), Swedish football manager
- Tova Magnusson-Norling (born 1968), Swedish film and television actress, comedian, and film director; former wife of Figge Norling

== See also ==
- Norling Drayang, Bhutanese music and film production company
