= Fidel Odreman =

Venezuelan boxer (1937–2017)

Personal information
- Born: 9 May 1937 Upata, Venezuela
- Died: 24 May 2017 (aged 80)

Sport
- Sport: Boxing
Medal record
Men's amateur boxing
Representing Venezuela
Pan American Games
Bronze medal – third place	1963 São Paulo	Middleweight

Fidel Odreman (9 May 1937 – 24 May 2017) was a Venezuelan boxer. He competed in the men's middleweight event at the 1960 Summer Olympics. At the 1960 Summer Olympics, he lost to Eddie Crook Jr. of the United States by a first-round knockout in the Round of 32.
