= Zbigniew Pietrzykowski =

Polish boxer (1934–2014)

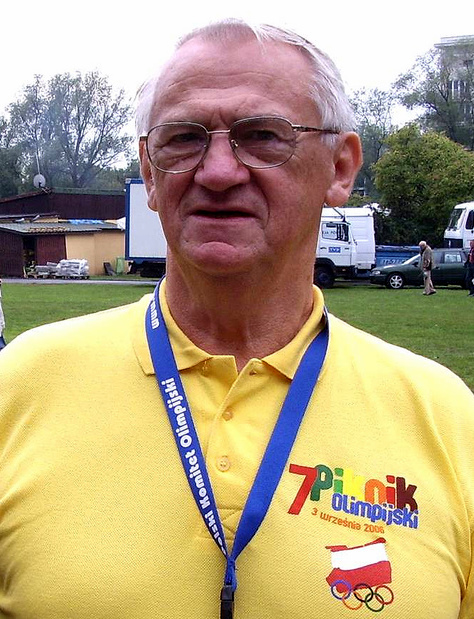
- Pietrzykowski in 2007

Personal information
- Nationality: Polish
- Born: 4 October 1934 Bestwinka, Poland
- Died: 19 May 2014 (aged 79) Bielsko-Biała, Poland

Sport
- Sport: Boxing

Achievements and titles
- Olympic finals: 1956, 1960, 1964
Medal record
Boxing
Representing Poland
Event	1st	2nd	3rd
Olympic Games	0	1	2
World Championships	0	0	0
European Championships	4	0	1
Total	4	1	3
Olympic Games
Silver medal – second place	1960 Rome	Light heavyweight
Bronze medal – third place	1956 Melbourne	Light middleweight
Bronze medal – third place	1964 Tokyo	Light heavyweight
European Amateur Championships
Gold medal – first place	1955 West Berlin	Light middleweight
Gold medal – first place	1957 Prague	Middleweight
Gold medal – first place	1959 Lucerne	Light heavyweight
Gold medal – first place	1963 Moscow	Light heavyweight
Bronze medal – third place	1953 Warsaw	Light middleweight

Zbigniew Jan Pietrzykowski (4 October 1934 – 19 May 2014) was a Polish boxer.

He took part in three Olympic Games, each time winning a medal. He won a bronze medal at Melbourne 1956 in the light middleweight division, after losing in the semi-final to Hungarian László Papp. Four years later in Rome, he reached the final of the light heavyweight division, where he lost to Muhammad Ali, who was 7 years younger. Finally, he won a bronze medal in Tokyo in 1964, in the light heavyweight division (defeated by Soviet Aleksei Kiselyov).

He participated five times at the European Amateur Boxing Championships and won five medals: a bronze in the light middleweight division in Warsaw 1953, and then four gold medals: in West Berlin (1955) in the light middleweight division, in Prague (1957) in the middleweight division, in Lucerne (1959), and in Moscow (1963) in the light heavyweight division.

He won the championship of Poland 11 times: in the light middleweight division in 1954, 1955 and 1956, in the middleweight division in 1957 and in the light heavyweight division in 1959, 1960, 1961, 1962, 1963, 1964 and 1965.

Pietrzykowski was also a champion in relation to his performances in the national Polish team fighting 44 bouts, winning 42 of them and losing twice. In his career, he fought 350 bouts winning 334 of them, drawing 2 and losing 14.

Pietrzykowski was the first winner of the Aleksander Reksza Boxing Award in 1986.

== 1956 Olympic results ==
- Round of 16: defeated Richard Karpov (Soviet Union) on points
- Quarterfinal: defeated Boris Nikolov (Bulgaria) on points
- Semifinal: lost to Laszlo Papp (Hungary) on points (was awarded bronze medal)

== 1960 Olympic results ==
- Round of 32: defeated Carl Crawford (British Guiana) on points, 5–0
- Round of 16: defeated Emil Willer (Germany) on points, 5–0
- Quarterfinal: defeated Petar Spasov (Bulgaria) on points, 5–0
- Semifinal: defeated Giulio Saraudi (Italy) on points, 5–0
- Final: lost to Muhammad Ali (then known as Cassius Clay) (USA) on points, 0–5 (was awarded the silver medal)

== 1964 Olympic results ==
- Round one: bye
- Round two: defeated Ronald Holmes (Jamaica) disqualified
- Quarterfinal: defeated Rafael Gargiulo (Argentina) on points, 5–0
- Semifinal: lost to Aleksei Kiselyov (Soviet Union) 1–4 (was awarded bronze medal)
