= Joseph Casey =

Joseph Casey is the name of:

- Joseph E. Casey (1898–1980), U.S. Congressman from Massachusetts
- Joseph H. Casey (1918–2010), Nova Scotia politician
- Joseph M. Casey (1827–1895), Iowa state legislator
- Joseph Casey (congressman) (1814–1879), U.S. Congressman from Pennsylvania

== See also ==
- Joe Casey (disambiguation)
