= Vladimir Yengibaryan =

Armenian boxer (1932–2013)

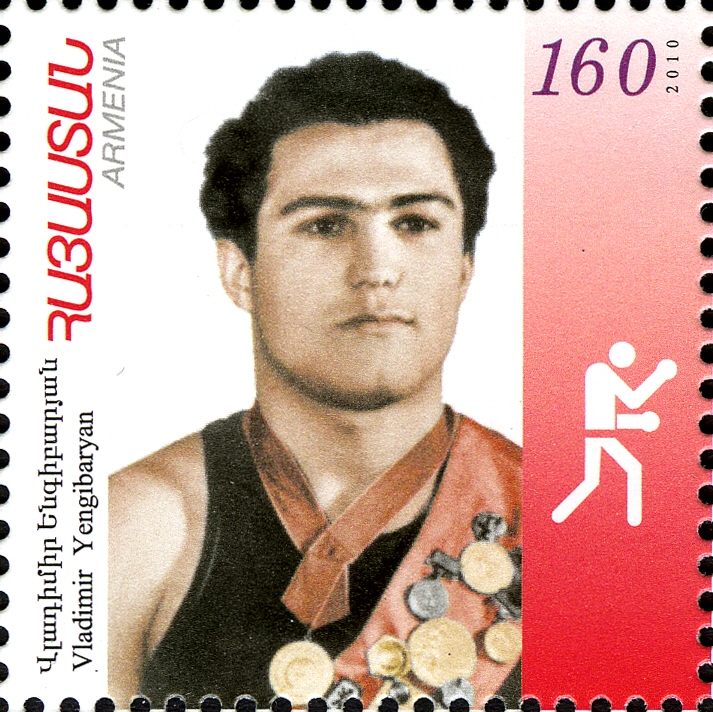
- Yengibaryan on a 2010 Armenian stamp

Personal information
- Born: 24 April 1932 Yerevan, Armenian SSR, Soviet Union
- Died: 1 February 2013 (aged 80) Los Angeles, California, United States
- Height: 164 cm (5 ft 5 in)
- Weight: 63 kg (139 lb)

Sport
- Sport: Boxing
- Club: Trudovye Rezervy, Yerevan
Medal record
Representing the Soviet Union
Olympic Games
Gold medal – first place	1956 Melbourne	-63.5 kg
European Amateur Championships
Gold medal – first place	1953 Warsaw	-60 kg
Bronze medal – third place	1955 West Berlin	-63.5 kg
Gold medal – first place	1957 Prague	-63.5 kg
Gold medal – first place	1959 Luzern	-63.5 kg

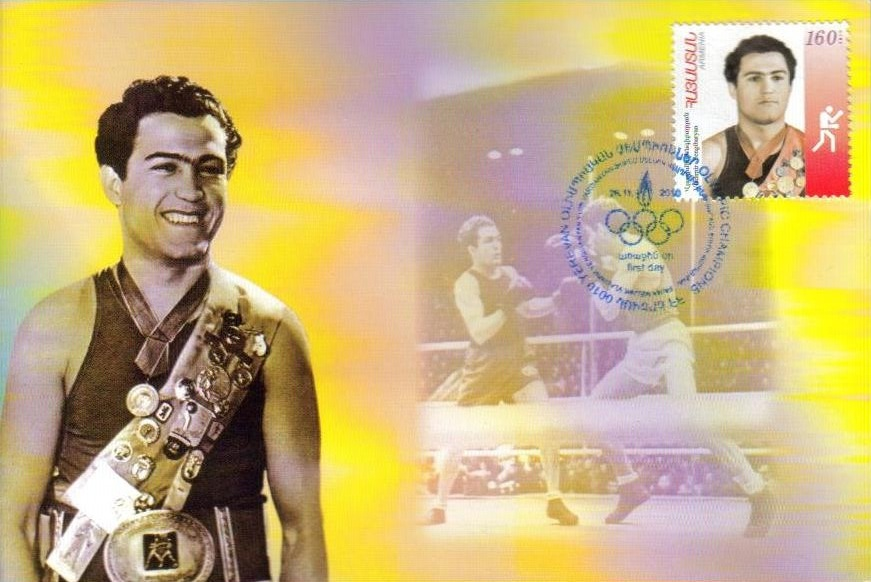
2010 Armenian post stamp showing Yengibaryan.

Vladimir Yengibaryan (Armenian: Վլադիմիր Ենգիբարյան, 24 April 1932 – 1 February 2013) was a Soviet and Armenian light-welterweight boxer. He was an Olympic champion, three-time European champion and three-time Soviet champion. In 1956, he was named the Honoured Master of Sports of the USSR and awarded the Order of the Red Banner of Labour. During his career he won 255 out of 267 bouts.

== Boxing career ==
"I know many talented Soviet fighters, but the best of them – Vladimir Yengibaryan. This standard boxing talent."

— Laszlo Papp

Yengibaryan was born as a fourth child. He took up boxing in 1946, training in Yerevan first with Artyom Arutyunov and then with Edward Aristakesyan.

Yengibaryan won a bronze medal in the bantamweight division at the 1951 Soviet Championships, and next year was included in the Soviet national team. He did not compete at the 1952 Summer Olympics due to an injury. The Soviet Union debuted at the European Boxing Championships in 1953, where Yengibaryan won a gold medal in the lightweight division, becoming the first Soviet European champion in boxing. In 1954, Yengibaryan moved up to the light-welterweight division and remained at this weight. He won his first Soviet title in 1955 and would win it again in 1956 and 1958. Yengibaryan also won gold medals at the 1956 Olympics and 1957 and 1959 European Amateur Boxing Championships. He went to the 1960 Summer Olympics in Rome as a favorite, but injured a shoulder in the tournament and lost in the quarterfinals to Marian Kasprzyk.

== Coaching career ==
Yengibaryan retired shortly after the 1960 Olympics and for more than three decades coached young boxers in Yerevan. He founded the Children and Youth Sport School, which now bears his name. Yengibaryan later became an international judge and in the 1970s represented Soviet Union in the AIBA Referee Commission. In 1992, he immigrated to the United States, where he worked as a boxing coach until his death.

== Death ==
In his last years Yengibaryan was suffering from the Alzheimer's disease which resulted in his death at the age 81. A memorial service was held for him on 3 February in Armenia. The memorial ceremony for Yengibaryan took place at the Saint Sarkis Cathedral in Yerevan. The ceremony was attended by the Armenian Minister of Sport and President of National Olympic Committee. After the ceremony, an annual boxing tournament was dedicated to Yengibaryan. Later upon the wish of Yengibaryan's daughter his body was buried in Armenia.

== See also ==
- List of Armenian boxers
