= Bela Istvan Horvath =

Swiss boxer

Personal information
- Nationality: Swiss
- Born: 31 January 1937 (age 88)

Sport
- Sport: Boxing

Bela Istvan Horvath (born 31 January 1937) is a Swiss boxer. He competed in the men's light heavyweight event at the 1964 Summer Olympics. At the 1964 Summer Olympics, he lost to Rafael Gargiulo of Argentina.
