= Franco Valle =

Italian boxer (1940–2003)

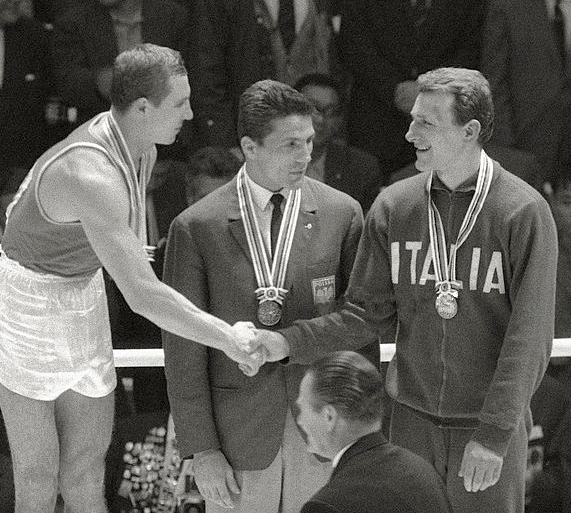
- Franco Valle (right) at the 1964 Olympics

Personal information
- Born: 15 February 1940 Genoa, Italy
- Died: 10 April 2003 (aged 63)
- Height: 1.77 m (5 ft 10 in)
- Weight: 75 kg (165 lb), Middleweight

Boxing career

Boxing record
- Total fights: 6
- Wins: 3
- Win by KO: 2
- Losses: 3
- Draws: 0
Medal record
Representing Italy
Olympic Games
Bronze medal – third place	1964 Tokyo	Middleweight

Franco Valle (15 February 1940 – 10 April 2003) was an Italian boxer who won a bronze medal at the 1964 Olympics. After that he turned professional, but had limited success, and retired in 1966 with a record of 3-3.

== 1964 Olympic boxing results ==
Below is the record of Franco Valle, an Italian middleweight boxer who competed at the 1964 Tokyo Olympics:

- Round of 32: bye
- Round of 16: defeated Leonidas Cezar (Brazil) by decision, 4-1
- Quarterfinal: defeated Guillermo Salinas (Chile) by decision, 5-0
- Semifinal: lost to Emil Schulz (United Team of Germany) by decision, 0-5 (awarded bronze medal)
