= Gerald Collins (boxer) =

Canadian boxer

Personal information
- Nationality: Canadian
- Born: 3 July 1933
- Died: 31 December 2008 (aged 75)

Sport
- Sport: Boxing

Gerald Collins (3 July 1933 – 31 December 2008) was a Canadian boxer. He competed in the men's light heavyweight event at the 1956 Summer Olympics. At the 1956 Summer Olympics, he lost to Ottavio Panunzi of Italy.
