= Boxing at the 1964 Summer Olympics – Middleweight =

Boxing competitions

The middleweight class in the boxing at the 1964 Summer Olympics competition was the third-heaviest class. Middleweights were limited to those boxers weighing less than 75 kilograms. 20 boxers from 20 nations competed.

== Medalists ==
Gold	Valery Popenchenko; Soviet Union
Silver	Emil Schulz; United Team of Germany
Bronze	Franco Valle; Italy
Bronze	Tadeusz Walasek; Poland

== Results ==
Round of 32; 14 October
Aguilar (ARG)	5
Tenma (JPN)	0
Walasek (POL)	5
Bukowski (AUS)	0
Hassan (EGY)	5
Frauenlob (AUT)	0
Marty (FRA)	0
Odhiambo (UGA)	5

Round of 16; 18 October
Stack (GBR)	RSC
Schulz (EUA)	W
Monea (ROU)	5
Kim (KOR)	0
Leonidas Cezar (BRA)	1
Valle (ITA)	4
Ahidous (MAR)	RSC
Salinas (CHI)	W
Popenchenko (URS)	W
Mahmud (PAK)	RSC
Rosette (USA)	2
Darkey (GHA)	3
Aguilar (ARG)	0
Walasek (POL)	5
Hassan (EGY)	5
Odhiambo (UGA)	0

Quarterfinals; 20 October
Schulz (EUA)	5
Monea (ROU)	0
Valle (ITA)	5
Salinas (CHI)	0
Popenchenko (URS)	5
Darkey (GHA)	0
Walasek (POL)	5
Hassan (EGY)	0

Semifinals; 21 October
Schulz (EUA)	5
Valle (ITA) (bronze)	0
Popenchenko (URS)	KO
Walasek (POL) (bronze)	L

Final; 23 October
Schulz (EUA) (silver)	RSC
Popenchenko (URS) (gold)	W

== Sources ==
Tokyo Organizing Committee (1964). The Games of the XVIII Olympiad: Tokyo 1964, vol. 2.
