= Andrzej Wojciechowski =

Polish boxer

Personal information
- Nationality: Polish
- Born: 1 April 1933; Włocławek, Poland
- Died: 16 June 1997 (aged 64); Wrocław, Poland

Sport
- Sport: Boxing

Andrzej Wojciechowski (1 April 1933 – 16 June 1997) was a Polish boxer. He competed in the men's light heavyweight event at the 1956 Summer Olympics.
