= Emil Willer =

German boxer

Personal information
- Nationality: German
- Born: 1 September 1932 (age 92); Kiel, Germany

Sport
- Sport: Boxing

Emil Willer (born 1 September 1932) is a German boxer. He competed in the men's light heavyweight event at the 1960 Summer Olympics. At the 1960 Summer Olympics, he lost to Zbigniew Pietrzykowski of Poland.
