= Rainer Poser =

German boxer

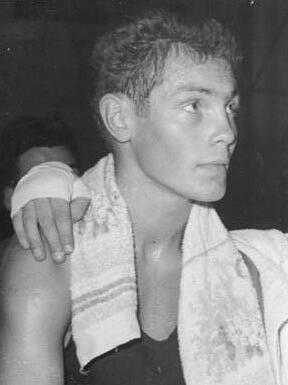
- Poser in 1963

Medal record

Men's boxing

Representing East Germany

European Championships
Bronze medal – third place	1963 Moscow	Bantamweight

Rainer Poser (born 14 May 1941) is a German bantamweight boxer who won the bronze medals of international competitions. He competed for the SC Dynamo Berlin / Sportvereinigung (SV) Dynamo. He also competed in the men's bantamweight event at the 1964 Summer Olympics.
