= Frik van Rooyen =

South African boxer

Personal information
- Nationality: South African
- Born: 6 November 1936 (age 88); Waterberg, South Africa

Sport
- Sport: Boxing

Frik van Rooyen (born 6 November 1936) is a South African boxer. He competed in the men's middleweight event at the 1960 Summer Olympics.
