= Aloizs Tumiņš =

Latvian boxer (1938–2009)

Personal information
- Nationality: Soviet Union; Latvia
- Born: Aloizs Tumiņš; 22 March 1938 Riga, Latvia
- Died: 29 January 2009 (age 70) Riga, Latvia
- Weight: Amateur boxing

Boxing career

Boxing record
- Total fights: 220
- Wins: 200

Aloizs Tumiņš (22 March 1938 – 29 January 2009) was a Latvian boxer from the Soviet Union.

He won two medals at the European Amateur Boxing Championships: gold medal at Belgrade 1961 and silver one at Moscow 1963 both in the Light Welterweight division.
