= Joe Casey (boxer) =

Irish boxer

Personal information
- Nationality: Irish
- Born: 19 April 1937; Templeglantine, Ireland
- Died: 21 March 2009 (aged 71)

Sport
- Sport: Boxing

Joe Casey (19 April 1937 – 21 March 2009) was an Irish boxer. He competed in the men's heavyweight event at the 1960 Summer Olympics. At the 1960 Summer Olympics, he lost in his opening fight to Obrad Sretenovic of Yugoslavia.
