= Boxing at the 1956 Summer Olympics – Light middleweight =

Olympic boxing tournament

Light middleweight boxing at the Games of the XVI Olympiad
- Venue: West Melbourne Stadium
- Dates: 24 November – 1 December 1956
- Competitors: 14 from 14 nations

Medalists
1st place, gold medalist(s)		László Papp	Hungary
2nd place, silver medalist(s)		José Torres	United States
3rd place, bronze medalist(s)		John McCormack	Great Britain
3rd place, bronze medalist(s)		Zbigniew Pietrzykowski	Poland

The men's light middleweight event was part of the boxing programme at the 1956 Summer Olympics. The weight class was allowed boxers of up to 71 kilograms to compete. The competition was held from 24 November to 1 December 1956. 14 boxers from 14 nations competed.

== Medalists ==
Gold	László Papp; Hungary
Silver	José Torres; United States
Bronze	John McCormack; Great Britain
Bronze	Zbigniew Pietrzykowski; Poland

== Results ==
=== First round ===
- Boris Nikolov (BUL) def. Muhammad Safdar (PAK), PTS
- Zbigniew Pietrzykowski (POL) def. Rychard Karpov (URS), PTS
- Ulrich Kienast (FRG) def. James Montgomery (CAN), PTS
- John McCormack (GBR) def. Alexander Webster (RSA), PTS
- José Torres (USA) def. Peter Read (AUS), PTS
- Franco Scisciani (ITA) def. Eugène Legrand (FRA), PTS

=== Quarterfinals ===
- László Papp (HUN) def. Alberto Sáenz (ARG), RSC-3
- Zbigniew Pietrzykowski (POL) def. Boris Nikolov (BUL), PTS
- John McCormack (GBR) def. Ulrich Kienast (FRG), RSC-3
- José Torres (USA) def. Franco Scisciani (ITA), PTS

=== Semifinals ===
- László Papp (HUN) def. Zbigniew Pietrzykowski (POL), PTS
- José Torres (USA) def. John McCormack (GBR), PTS

=== Final ===
- László Papp (HUN) def. José Torres (USA), PTS
