= Hitoshi Tenma =

Japanese boxer

Personal information
- Nationality: Japanese
- Born: 3 June 1942 (age 82)

Sport
- Sport: Boxing

Hitoshi Tenma (天間 一, Tenma Hitoshi, born 3 June 1942) is a Japanese boxer. He competed in the men's middleweight event at the 1964 Summer Olympics. At the 1964 Summer Olympics, he lost to Juan Aguilar of Argentina in the Round of 32.
