= Jim Boyd (boxer) =

American boxer (1930–1997)

Personal information
- Born: November 30, 1930 Rocky Mount, North Carolina, U.S.
- Died: January 25, 1997 (aged 66) Baltimore, Maryland, U.S.
Medal record
Men's Boxing
Representing United States
Olympic Games
Gold medal – first place	1956 Melbourne	Light heavyweight

James Felton "Jim" Boyd (November 30, 1930 – January 25, 1997) was an American boxer from Rocky Mount, North Carolina, who competed in the light heavyweight division during his career as an amateur. Boyd won the gold medal at the 1956 Olympic Games in Melbourne, Australia.

== Amateur career ==
Boyd was the National Golden Gloves Light Heavyweight Champion of 1956, and the Olympic light heavyweight gold medalist at the 1956 Melbourne Olympic Games.

== Pro career ==
Boyd turned pro in 1959, only fighting a few times. He retired in 1962 having won 2, lost 2, and drawn 3, with 1 KO.

== Other honors ==
A native of Rocky Mount, North Carolina, Boyd was inducted into the Twin County Hall of Fame in 2009.
