= Max Bösiger =

Swiss boxer

Personal information
- Nationality: Swiss
- Born: 23 December 1933; Baden, Switzerland
- Died: 7 June 2019 (aged 85)

Sport
- Sport: Boxing

Max Bösiger (23 December 1933 – 7 June 2019) was a Swiss boxer. He competed in the men's heavyweight event at the 1960 Summer Olympics. At the 1960 Summer Olympics, he lost to Günter Siegmund of the United Team of Germany.
