= Antero Halonen =

Finnish boxer

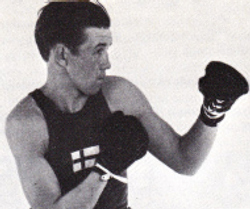

Personal information
- Born: 15 December 1938 Hankasalmi, Finland
- Died: 26 October 2016 (aged 77)
- Height: 169 cm (5 ft 7 in)
- Weight: 57–62 kg (126–137 lb)

Sport
- Sport: Boxing
- Club: Varkauden Tarmo; Warkauden urheilijat
Medal record
Representing Finland
European Championships
Bronze medal – third place	1963 Moscow	-60 kg

Tarmo Antero "Lukkeri" Halonen (15 December 1938 – 26 October 2016) was an amateur lightweight boxer from Finland, who won a bronze medal at the 1963 European Championships. He competed in the Lightweight division at the 1964 Summer Olympics, but lost in the second round to the eventual winner Józef Grudzień. Halonen won the national lightweight title for three consecutive years, from 1962 to 1964. He was a grinder by profession, and after retiring from boxing worked as a coach.
