= Jacques Marty =

French boxer

Personal information
- Nationality: French
- Born: 30 July 1940; Neuilly-sur-Seine, France
- Died: 2 August 2012 (aged 72)

Sport
- Sport: Boxing

Jacques Marty (30 July 1940 – 2 August 2012) was a French boxer. He competed in the men's middleweight event at the 1964 Summer Olympics.
