= Manfred Homberg =

German boxer (1933–2010)

Manfred Homberg (15 July 1933 – 12 August 2010) was a German boxer.

Homberg had an outstanding amateur career. He was a German champion in the Flyweight class (1958 and 1959), and the Bantamweight class (1961). He won twice the gold medal in the European Amateur Boxing Championships, at Prague 1957 and Lucerne 1959. At the 1960 Summer Olympics, he was eliminated in the quarterfinals of the flyweight class.

In the period of 1952–1962, he was on the German national team 19 times (won 17, lost 1, drawn 1). He died in Düsseldorf in August 2010.
