= Peter Paul Odhiambo =

Ugandan boxer

Personal information
- Nationality: Ugandan
- Born: 9 September 1937 (age 87)

Sport
- Sport: Boxing

Peter Paul Odhiambo (born 9 September 1937) is a Ugandan boxer. He competed in the men's middleweight event at the 1964 Summer Olympics.
