= Rolf Caroli =

German boxer

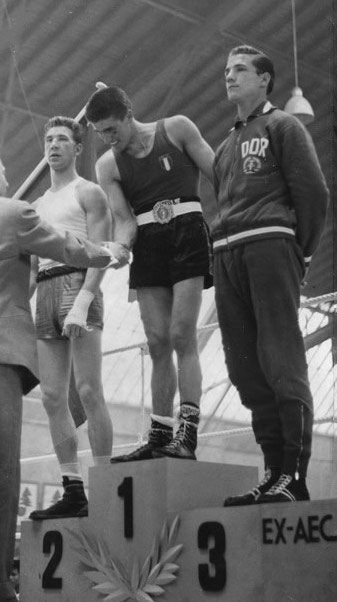
- Caroli (right) at the 1959 European Championships

Personal information
- Born: 23 December 1933 Halle an der Saale, Germany
- Died: 10 June 2007 (aged 73) Halle an der Saale, Germany
- Height: 182 cm (6 ft 0 in)
- Weight: 71 kg (157 lb)

Sport
- Sport: Boxing
- Club: SV Halle, Halle an der Saale
- Coached by: Youth coach at SC Chemie Halle
Medal record
Representing East Germany
European Championships
Bronze medal – third place	1955 West Berlin	-71 kg
Bronze medal – third place	1957 Prague	-71 kg
Bronze medal – third place	1959 Lucerne	-71 kg

Rolf Caroli (23 December 1933 – 10 June 2007) was an East German amateur light-middleweight boxer who won bronze medals at the European championships in 1955, 1957 and 1959. He competed in the 1960 Summer Olympics, but lost in the first bout. His brother was East German boxing champion Georg Caroli.

== 1960 Olympic results ==
Below is the record of Rolf Caroli, a light middleweight boxer who competed for the United German Team at the 1960 Rome Olympics:

- Round of 32: lost to Pedro Votta (Uruguay) by decision, 2–3
