= Ahmed Hassan (boxer) =

Egyptian boxer

Personal information
- Nationality: Egyptian
- Born: 12 September 1941 (age 83)

Sport
- Sport: Boxing

Ahmed Hassan (born 12 September 1941) is an Egyptian boxer. He competed in the men's middleweight event at the 1964 Summer Olympics.
