= Yvon Becaus =

Belgian boxer

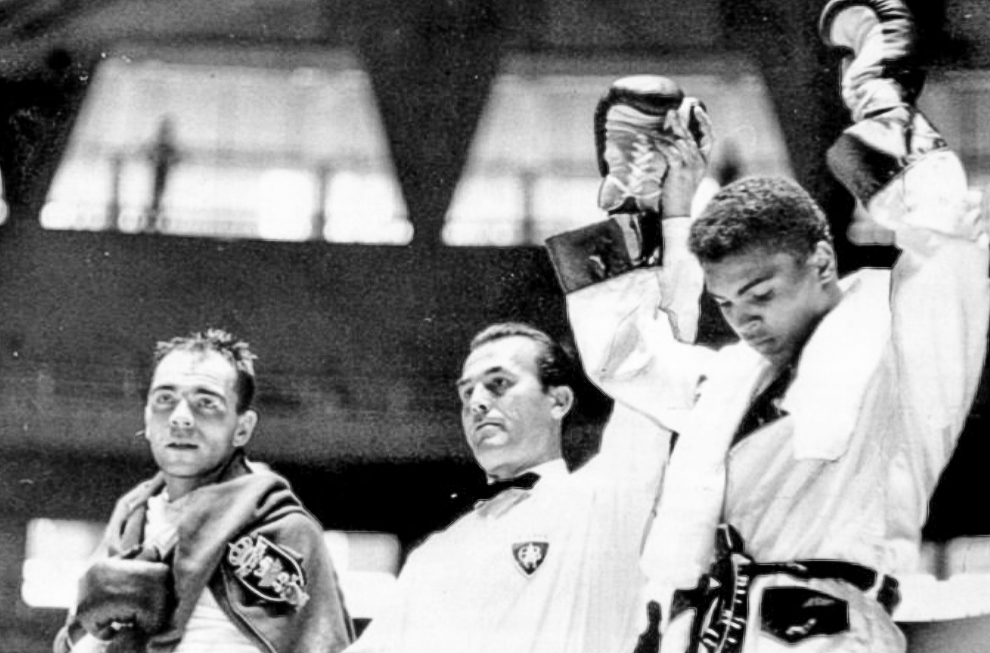
- Yvon Becaus (left) with Cassius Clay (right) at the 1960 Summer Olympics

Personal information
- Nationality: Belgian
- Born: 9 April 1936; Gosselies, Belgium
- Died: 3 December 2016 (aged 80)

Sport
- Sport: Boxing

Yvon Becaus (9 April 1936 – 3 December 2016) was a Belgian boxer. He competed in the men's light heavyweight event at the 1960 Summer Olympics. At the 1960 Summer Olympics, he lost to Cassius Clay of the United States.
