= Moussa El-Gelidi =

Egyptian boxer (born 1932)

Personal information
- Full name: Muhammad Moussa El-Gelidi
- Nationality: Egyptian
- Born: 14 April 1932 Alexandria, Egypt
- Died: before 2013

Sport
- Sport: Boxing

Muhammad Moussa El-Gelidi (14 April 1932 – before 2013) was an Egyptian boxer. He competed in the men's middleweight event at the 1960 Summer Olympics. El-Gelidi died before 2013.
