= Willy Venneman =

Belgian boxer

Personal information
- Nationality: Belgian
- Born: January 15, 1939; Berlare, Belgium
- Died: 8 January 2025 (aged 85); Ghent, Belgium

Sport
- Sport: Boxing

Willy Venneman (15 January 1939 – 8 January 2025) was a Belgian boxer. He competed in the men's heavyweight event at the 1960 Summer Olympics.
