= Andy Wyper =

Scottish boxer

Personal information
- Nationality: Scotland
- Born: Andrew McCallum Wyper; 25 March 1940 Newmilns, Ayrshire, Scotland
- Died: 20 April 2023 (aged 83) Kilmarnock, Scotland

Boxing career
Medal record
Men's amateur boxing
Representing Scotland
European Championships
Silver medal – second place	1963 Moscow	Light middleweight

Andrew McCallum Wyper (25 March 1940 – 20 April 2023) was a Scottish boxer.

== Life and career ==
Wyper was born in Newmilns, Ayrshire. He was a miner.

Wyper competed at the 1963 European Amateur Boxing Championships, winning the silver medal in the light middleweight event.

Wyper died on 20 April 2023 in Kilmarnock, at the age of 83.
