= Joseph Syoz =

French boxer (1937–2013)

Personal information
- Nationality: French
- Born: 18 January 1937; Autremencourt, France
- Died: 13 January 2013 (aged 75)

Sport
- Sport: Boxing

Joseph Syoz (18 January 1937 – 13 January 2013) was a French boxer. He competed in the men's heavyweight event at the 1960 Summer Olympics.
