= John McCormack (boxer) =

Scottish boxer

Personal information
- Nationality: British (Scottish)
- Born: 9 January 1935 Maryhill, Glasgow, Scotland
- Died: 23 May 2014 (aged 79) Paisley, Scotland

Sport
- Sport: boxing
Medal record
Representing Great Britain
Men's Boxing
Olympic Games
Bronze medal – third place	1956 Melbourne	Light Middleweight

John McCormack (9 January 1935 – 23 May 2014) was a Scottish boxer.

== Life and career ==
Known as "Cowboy", McCormack started boxing in 1950 at the age of fifteen. He won the 1956 Amateur Boxing Association British light-middleweight title, when boxing out of the NB Loco ABC. He also held the Scottish title as an amateur. He earned the bronze medal in the light middleweight division (– 71 kg) at the 1956 Summer Olympics in Melbourne, Australia. McCormack compiled an amateur record of 103-6 (51 knockouts).

McCormack died on 23 May 2014 after suffering from Alzheimer's disease. He is survived by his wife Margaret, his daughter Kim, his son Mark, and grandchildren.

== 1956 Olympic results ==
Below is the record of John McCormack, a light middleweight boxer who represented Great Britain at the 1956 Melbourne Olympics:

- Round of 16: defeated Alexander Webster (South Africa) on points
- Quarterfinal: defeated Ulrich Krenast (West Germany) by a third-round knockout
- Semifinal: lost to Jose Torres (United States) on points (was awarded bronze medal)

== See also ==
- List of British middleweight boxing champions
