= Franco De Piccoli =

Italian boxer (1937–2026)

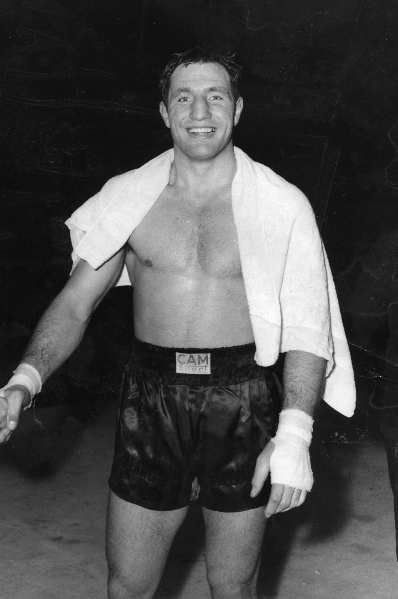
- De Piccoli in 1960

Personal information
- Born: 29 November 1937 Campalto, Italy
- Died: 22 May 2026 (aged 88)
- Height: 1.86 m (6 ft 1 in)
- Weight: 96 kg (212 lb)

Sport
- Sport: Boxing
Medal record
Representing Italy
Olympic Games
Gold medal – first place	1960 Rome	Heavyweight
World Military Championships
Gold medal – first place	1960 Wiesbaden	Heavyweight

Francesco De Piccoli (29 November 1937 – 22 May 2026) was an Italian boxer, who won the gold medal in the heavyweight division (+91 kg) at the 1960 Summer Olympics in Rome.

== Amateur career ==
De Piccoli started training in boxing in 1955, and won national heavyweight titles in 1959 and 1960. At the 1960 Olympics, he easily reached the final, in which he knocked out Daan Bekker after 90 seconds. He turned professional right after the Olympics. After retiring in 1965 he worked as a driving instructor.

== Death ==
De Piccoli died on 22 May 2026, at the age of 88.

== Professional record ==
37 Wins (29 knockouts, 6 decisions, 2 DQs), 4 Losses (4 knockouts)
Result	Record	Opponent	Type	Round	Date	Location	Notes
Loss	8-2	(Germany) Peter Weiland	TKO	2	26 December 1965	(Italy) Mestre, Veneto	
Loss	3-7-3	(United States) Everett Copeland	KO	6	15 October 1965	(Italy) Turin, Piedmont	
Win	18-10-4	(United States) Dave Duke Johnson	KO	1	10 July 1965	(Italy) Mestre, Veneto	
Win	18-18-2	(United States) Sonny "Policeman" Moore	KO	1	7 May 1965	(Italy) Rome, Lazio	
Win	7-6-3	(United States) Aaron Beasley	KO	2	12 April 1965	(Italy) Bologna, Emilia-Romagna	
Win	22-9-3	(United States) Floyd Joyner	KO	1	2 April 1965	(Italy) Turin, Piedmont	
Win	19-6-1	(United States) Billy "The Barber" Daniels	PTS	10	19 February 1965	(Italy) Rome, Lazio	
Win	16-9	(United States) Herb Siler	KO	2	23 January 1965	(Italy) Palasport di San Siro, Milan, Lombardy	
Win	18-30	(United States) Ollie Wilson	KO	4	26 December 1964	(Italy) Mestre, Veneto	
Win	1-4	(United States) Ed Sonny Andrews	KO	1	11 December 1964	(Italy) Palazzetto dello Sport, Rome, Lazio	
Win	14-11	(United States) Henry Wallitsch	KO	1	12 November 1964	(Italy) Milan, Lombardy	
Win	22-13-6	(United States) S.F.C. Matthew Jackson	DQ	1	18 September 1964	(Italy) Palazzetto dello Sport, Rome, Lazio	
Win	12-5-4	(Sweden) Lars Olaf Norling	PTS	10	22 May 1964	(Italy) Sports Palace, Turin, Piedmont	
Win	7-4-1	(Denmark) Carl Welschou	KO	4	11 May 1964	(Italy) Naples, Campania	
Loss	40-21-2	(Jamaica) Joe Bygraves	KO	5	7 June 1963	(Italy) Palazzetto dello Sport, Rome, Lazio	
Loss	25-17-2	(United States) Wayne Bethea	KO	4	22 March 1963	(Italy) Palazzetto dello Sport, Rome, Lazio	
Win	26-2	(United States) Tony Hughes	KO	2	1 March 1963	(Italy) Rome, Lazio	
Win	13-21-3	(United States) Neal Welch	PTS	10	4 February 1963	(Italy) Mestre, Veneto	
Win	39-26-8	(United States) Howard "Honeyboy" King	KO	1	18 January 1963	(Italy) Palazzetto dello Sport, Rome, Lazio	King knocked out at 0:11 of the first round.
Win	8-5-1	(The Bahamas) Wendell Newton	TKO	3	30 November 1962	(Italy) Palazzetto dello Sport, Rome, Lazio	Referee stopped the bout at 2:30 of the third round.
Win	26-13-1	(United States) John Riggins	KO	1	9 November 1962	(Italy) Rome, Lazio	
Win	15-6-1	(United Kingdom) Ray Shiel	KO	2	22 October 1962	(Italy) Bologna, Emilia-Romagna	
Win	13-2	(Canada) Phonse LaSaga	KO	1	11 September 1962	(Italy) Palazzetto dello Sport, Rome, Lazio	LaSaga knocked out at 1:10 of the first round.
Win	4-2-1	(Germany) Kurt Stroer	KO	2	4 August 1962	(Italy) Genoa, Liguria	
Win	35-9-1	(United States) Buddy Turman	DQ	2	19 July 1962	(Italy) Rome, Lazio	
Win	13-18	(United States) Calvin Butler	KO	8	16 April 1962	(Italy) Bologna, Emilia-Romagna	
Win	14-13	(United States) Garvin Sawyer	TKO	4	30 March 1962	(Italy) Rome, Lazio	
Win	21-9-6	(Germany) Ulli Ritter	KO	4	21 December 1961	(Italy) Rome, Lazio	
Win	36-23-4	(Germany) Frankie Daniels	PTS	8	9 September 1961	(Italy) Mestre, Veneto	
Win	3-11-2	(Germany) Walter Haufft	KO	1	31 August 1961	(Italy) Turin, Piedmont	
Win	26-12-2	(France) Robert Duquesne	KO	1	5 July 1961	(Italy) Plamino Stadium, Rome, Lazio	
Win	11-12-1	(Spain) Jose Mariano Moracia Ibanes	KO	1	10 June 1961	(Italy) Mestre, Veneto	
Win	12-19-5	(Germany) Erwin Hack	KO	2	2 June 1961	(Italy) Taranto, Apulia	
Win	11-10-5	(Germany) Ossi Buettner	KO	3	16 May 1961	(Italy) Turin, Piedmont	
Win	7-3-3	(Germany) Werner Walloschek	KO	1	3 May 1961	(Italy) Naples, Campania	
Win	22-17-6	(Germany) Uwe Janssen	TKO	2	7 April 1961	(Italy) PalaLido, Milan, Lombardy	
Win	3-9-2	(Germany) Walter Haufft	KO	2	1 April 1961	(Italy) Ascoli Piceno, Marche	
Win	27-19-3	(Belgium) Alain Cherville	PTS	6	14 March 1961	(Italy) Bologna, Emilia-Romagna	
Win	14-25-5	(France) Maurice Mols	PTS	6	10 February 1961	(Italy) Palazzetto dello Sport, Rome, Lazio	
Win	14-43-5	(Germany) Robert Warmbrunn	KO	1	25 January 1961	(Italy) Mestre, Veneto	
Win	2-12	(Italy) Giovanni Moriggi	KO	1	26 December 1960	(Italy) Bologna, Emilia-Romagna	
