= Siegfried Olesch =

German boxer

Medal record

Representing East Germany

Men's Boxing

European Championships
Bronze medal – third place	1963 Moscow	Light heavyweight

Siegfried Olesch is a German lightweight boxer who won the bronze medal at the 1963 European Amateur Boxing Championships. He competed for the SC Dynamo Berlin / Sportvereinigung (SV) Dynamo.
