= Rodolfo Díaz (boxer, 1936) =

Argentine boxer (1936–2003)

Personal information
- Born: 30 July 1936 Buenos Aires, Argentina
- Died: 10 April 2003 (aged 66) Miami, Florida, United States

Sport
- Sport: Boxing

Rodolfo Díaz (30 July 1936 – 10 April 2003) was an Argentine boxer. He competed in the men's light heavyweight event at the 1956 Summer Olympics.
