= Achton Mikkelsen =

Danish boxer (1932–2013)

Personal information
- Full name: Achton Kjær Mikkelsen
- Nationality: Danish
- Born: 7 October 1932 Silkeborg, Denmark
- Died: 20 January 2013 (aged 80)

Sport
- Sport: Boxing

Achton Kjær Mikkelsen (7 October 1932 – 20 January 2013) was a Danish boxer. He competed in the men's middleweight event at the 1960 Summer Olympics. Mikkelsen died on 20 January 2013, at the age of 80.

== See also ==
- Jacobsen, Mogens (24 January 2013). "Achton Mikkelsen". Politiken (in Danish).
- Ritzau, Tue (1966). "Kamp nr. 7". Det Danske Filminstitut (in Danish).
