= Vasil Paparizov =

Bulgarian boxer

Personal information
- Nationality: Bulgarian
- Born: 22 February 1934 (age 91); Plovdiv, Bulgaria

Sport
- Sport: Boxing

Vasil Paparizov (born 22 February 1934) is a Bulgarian boxer. He competed in the men's middleweight event at the 1960 Summer Olympics. At the 1960 Summer Olympics, he lost to Ion Monea of Romania.
