= Teifion Davies =

Australian boxer

Personal information
- Nationality: Australian
- Born: 10 February 1940
- Died: 8 October 2015 (aged 75)

Sport
- Sport: Boxing

Teifion Davies (10 February 1940 – 8 October 2015) was an Australian boxer. He competed in the men's middleweight event at the 1960 Summer Olympics.
