= Eamonn McKeon =

Irish boxer

Personal information
- Nationality: Irish
- Born: 7 July 1934; Dublin, Ireland
- Died: 16 August 2017 (aged 83)

Sport
- Sport: Boxing

Eamonn McKeon (7 July 1934 – 16 August 2017) was an Irish boxer. He competed in the men's middleweight event at the 1960 Summer Olympics.
