= Giulio Saraudi =

Italian boxer

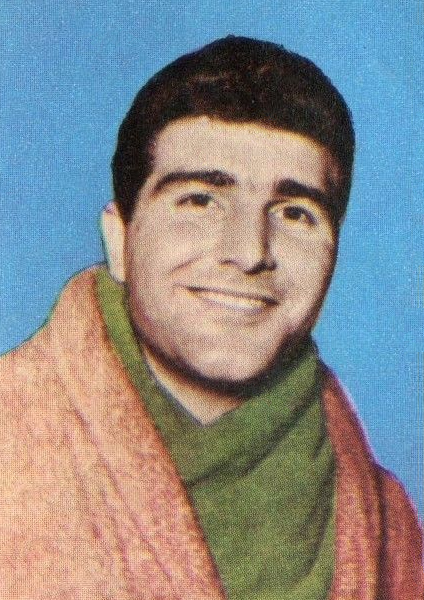

Personal information
- Nationality: Italian
- Born: 3 July 1938 Civitavecchia, Italy
- Died: 20 April 2005 (aged 66) Civitavecchia, Italy
- Height: 1.82 m (6 ft 0 in)
- Weight: Heavyweight

Boxing career

Boxing record
- Total fights: 14
- Wins: 9
- Win by KO: 4
- Losses: 1
- Draws: 3
Medal record
Representing Italy
Olympic Games
Bronze medal – third place	1960 Rome	Light heavyweight
European Amateur Championships
Bronze medal – third place	1959 Lucerne	Light heavyweight
Gold medal – first place	1961 Belgrade	Light heavyweight

Giulio Saraudi (3 July 1938 – 20 April 2005) was an Italian boxer. An Olympic bronze medalist, he held 49 titles and a line of 45 bouts, whom he won 37.

== Biography ==
Giulio Saraudi was born to Carlo Saraudi, a light heavyweight boxer who finished fourth at the 1924 Olympics. Giulio's younger brother Vittorio was also an elite light heavyweight boxer.

Giulio Saraudi won the light heavyweight bronze medal at the 1960 Olympic Games, behind Muhammad Ali (then known as Cassius Clay) and Zbigniew Pietrzykowski. Saraudi did not fight Clay, he lost to Pietrzykowski in a semifinal. At the European championships Saraudi won a gold medal in 1961 and a bronze in 1959. He turned professional in 1965, moving from light heavyweight to heavyweight, and was undefeated in his first twelve bouts before losing a decision to Johnny Prescott in 1967. He retired in 1968.

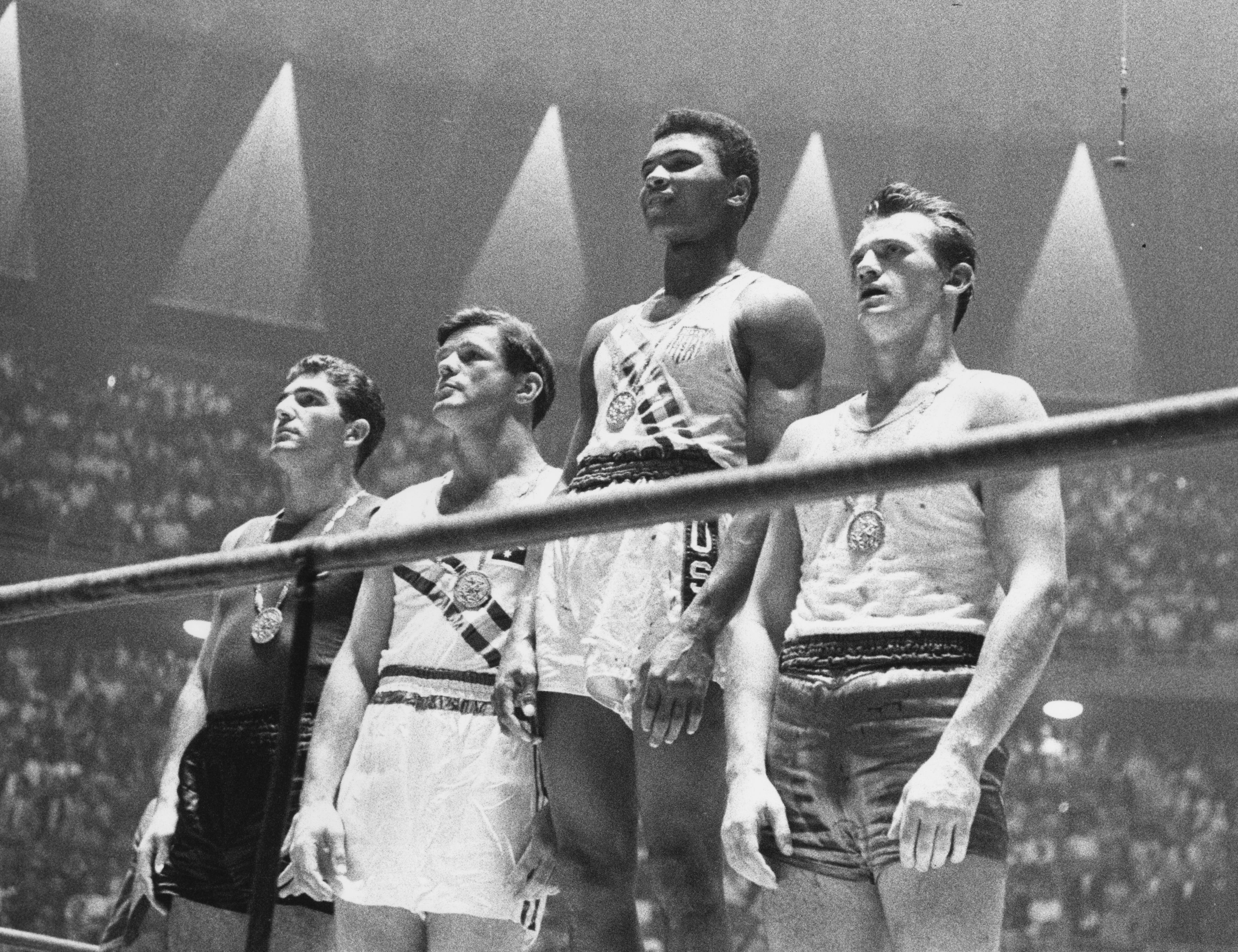
1960 Olympic light heavyweight podium. Left-right: Giulio Saraudi, Tony Madigan, Muhammad Ali and Zbigniew Pietrzykowski

== Olympic Results ==
Giulio Saraudi's results from the 1960 Olympic boxing tournament in the light heavyweight division:

- Round of 32: bye
- Round of 16: defeated Muhammad Safdar of Pakistan by decision, 5–0
- Quarterfinal: defeated Rafael Gargiulo of Argentina by decision, 5–0
- Semifinal: lost to Zbigniew Pietrzykowski of Poland, 0-5 (awarded bronze medal as a defeated semifinalist)

== Professional boxing record ==
9 Wins (4 knockouts, 5 decisions), 1 Loss (1 decision), 3 Draws, 1 No Contest
Result	Record	Opponent	Type	Round	Date	Location
Win	4–2–2	(United States) Roosevelt Eddie	PTS	8	19 January 1968	(Italy) Palazzetto dello Sport, Rome, Lazio
Loss	31–8–3	(United Kingdom) Johnny Prescott	PTS	10	24 April 1967	(United Kingdom) Nottingham Ice Stadium, Nottingham, Nottinghamshire
Win	8–21–3	(Belgium) Valere Mahau	PTS	8	16 March 1967	(Italy) Bologna, Emilia-Romagna
Draw	4–1	(South Africa) Remington Dyantyi	PTS	8	19 January 1967	(Italy) Land Rover Arena, Bologna, Emilia-Romagna
No contest	40–9–4	(Italy) Giulio Rinaldi	NC	5	2 December 1966	(Italy) Palazzetto dello Sport, Rome, Lazio
Win	10–3–2	(Germany) Juergen Blin	PTS	8	23 September 1966	(Italy) Palazzetto dello Sport, Rome, Lazio
Win	18–4–2	(Germany) Horst Benedens	PTS	8	14 May 1966	(Germany) Deutschlandhalle, Charlottenburg, Berlin
Draw	18–3	(Fiji) Leweni Waqa	PTS	8	4 February 1966	(Italy) Palazzetto dello Sport, Rome, Lazio
Draw	16–6–1	(Brazil) Renato Moraes	PTS	8	15 October 1965	(Italy) Palazzetto dello Sport, Rome, Lazio
Win	30–26–14	(Argentina) Jose Angel Manzur	TKO	6	10 September 1965	(Italy) Palasport di San Siro, Milan, Lombardy
Win	2–1	(Germany) Siegfried Gross	TKO	2	23 April 1965	(Italy) Bologna, Emilia-Romagna
Win	2–10–2	(Italy) Basilio Cominardi	PTS	6	24 March 1965	(Italy) Rome, Lazio
Win	3–26–3	(Syria) Mohamed Sahib	TKO	4	27 February 1965	(Italy) Palasport di San Siro, Milan, Lombardy
Win	0–3–1	(Italy) Alberto Grandolini	TKO	3	22 January 1965	(Italy) Palazzetto dello Sport, Rome, Lazio
