= Eugène Legrand =

French boxer

Personal information
- Nationality: French
- Born: 17 July 1934; Tourcoing, Nord, France
- Died: 15 December 2004 (aged 70); Salouël, Somme, France

Sport
- Sport: Boxing

Eugène Legrand (17 July 1934 – 15 November 2004) was a French boxer. He competed in the men's light middleweight event at the 1956 Summer Olympics.
