= Ulrich Kienast =

German boxer

Personal information
- Nationality: German
- Born: 20 March 1937 (age 88); Danzig, Free City of Danzig

Sport
- Sport: Boxing

Ulrich Kienast (born 20 March 1937) is a German boxer. He competed in the men's light middleweight event at the 1956 Summer Olympics.
