= Rupert König =

Austrian boxer

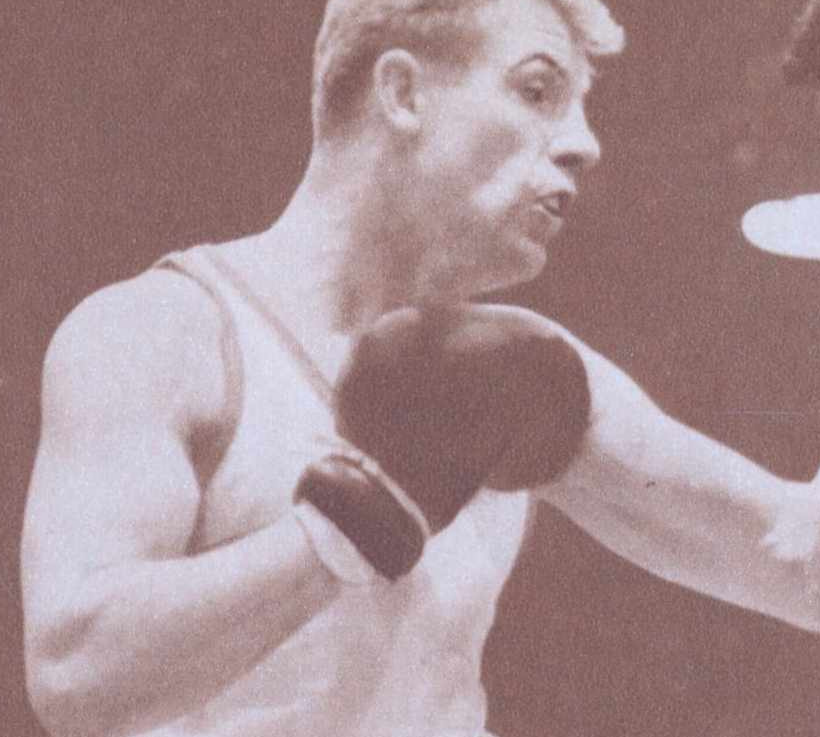

Personal information
- Nationality: Austrian
- Born: 3 April 1937 (age 88); Berchtesgaden, Germany

Sport
- Sport: Boxing

Rupert König (born 3 April 1937) is an Austrian boxer. He competed at the 1960 Summer Olympics and the 1964 Summer Olympics.

== 1964 Olympic results ==
Below is the record of Rupert König, an Austrian light welterweight boxer who competed at the 1964 Tokyo Olympics:

- Round of 64: bye
- Round of 32: lost to Iosif Mihalic (Romania) referee stopped contest
