= Valeri Popenchenko =

Soviet boxer (1937–1975)

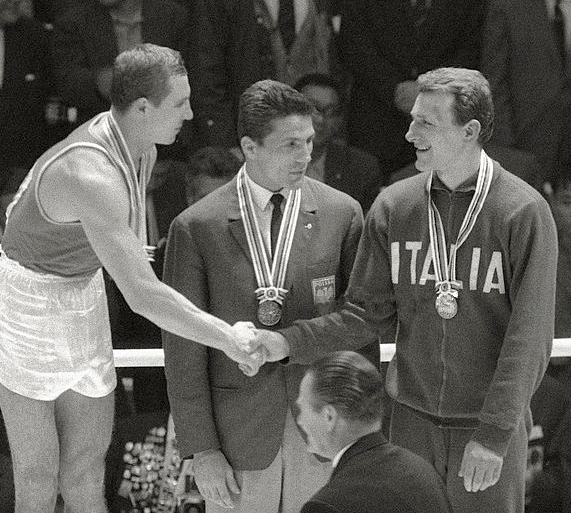
- Popenchenko (left) at the 1964 Olympics

Personal information
- Full name: Valeri Vladimirovich Popenchenko
- Born: 26 August 1937 Kuntsevo, Moscow Oblast, Russian SFSR, Soviet Union
- Died: 15 February 1975 (aged 37) Moscow, Russian SFSR, Soviet Union
- Height: 1.75 m (5 ft 9 in)
- Weight: 75 kg (165 lb)

Sport
- Sport: Boxing
- Club: Dynamo Leningrad
Medal record
Representing the Soviet Union
Olympic Games
Gold medal – first place	1964 Tokyo	Middleweight
European Amateur Championships
Gold medal – first place	1963 Moscow	Middleweight
Gold medal – first place	1965 Berlin	Middleweight

Valeri Vladimirovich Popenchenko (Russian: Валерий Владимирович Попенченко, 26 August 1937 – 15 February 1975) was a Soviet Olympic boxer who competed in the middleweight division (−75 kg). During his career he won 200 out of 213 bouts; he won an Olympic gold medal in 1964 and European titles in 1963 and 1965. He was named the Outstanding Boxer of the 1964 Olympics and given the Val Barker Trophy, becoming the only Soviet boxer to receive the honour. Popenchenko was known for his exceptional skills and agility in the ring, as well as his strong left hook.

== Biography ==
Popenchenko took boxing in 1948, and in 1959 won his first Soviet title. He finished third in 1960, but reclaimed the title in 1961 through 1965. He retired in 1965 and was awarded the Order of the Red Banner of Labour. In 1968, he graduated from the Leningrad Military Higher School of the Border Service, and from 1970 until his death worked as a head of physical culture department of the Bauman Moscow State Technical University. In the mid-1970s the university was building new sporting facilities, and as department head Popenchenko would often visit the construction site. On 15 February 1975, while running down the stairs where handrails were not yet installed, he lost his balance, fell three floors and died. He was buried at Vvedenskoye Cemetery.

== 1964 Olympic results ==
Below are the results from the 1964 Tokyo Olympic boxing tournament of Valeri Popenchenko of the Soviet Union who competed in the middleweight division:

- Round of 32: bye
- Round of 16: defeated Sutan Mahmud (Pakistan) referee stopped contest
- Quarterfinal: defeated Joe Darkey (Ghana) by decision, 5–0
- Semifinal: defeated Tadeusz Walasek (Poland) by knockout
- Final: defeated Emil Schulz (United Team of Germany) referee stopped contest (gold medal)
