= Eddie Crook Jr. =

American boxer

Olympic medal record

Men's boxing

Representing the United States
| Gold medal – first place | 1960 Rome | Middleweight |

Edward "Eddie" Crook Jr. (April 19, 1929 – July 25, 2005) won a gold medal for the United States as a boxing teammate of Muhammad Ali in the 1960 Summer Olympics. Crook was also a member of Omega Psi Phi fraternity.

== Amateur career ==
Boxing out of Detroit, Crook was an Olympic gold medalist for the United States at the 1960 Olympic Games in Rome, in the 165 pound class. Crook defeated Tadeusz Walasek of Poland in the gold medal match by 3-2 decision. Reportedly he was the oldest Army boxer to ever win an Olympic gold medal. He had no professional career.

== 1960 Olympic results ==
Below is the record of Eddie Crook Jr., an American middleweight boxer who competed at the 1960 Rome Olympics:

- Round of 32: defeated Fidel Odreman (Venezuela) by a first-round knockout
- Round of 16: defeated Peter Odhiambo (Uganda) by decision, 5–0
- Quarterfinal: defeated Chang Lo-pu (Formosa) by a third-round knockout
- Semifinal: defeated Ion Monea (Romania) by a second-round knockout
- Final: defeated Tadeusz Walasek (Poland) by decision, 3-2 (won gold medal)

== Life after boxing ==
After winning his gold medal, Crook served two tours in the Vietnam War as a command sergeant major in the U.S. Army. He received two Purple Hearts, a Silver Star, two Bronze Stars and an Air Medal and was a boxing coach at Fort Benning, Georgia. Crook was quarterback of the Berlin Bears, earning All-Army honors and named "Most Valuable Player." He earned a degree in Business Management from Troy State University. Crook then served as ROTC Instructor at Alcorn State in Mississippi.

== Death ==
Crook died on July 25, 2005, of natural causes in Montgomery, Alabama. He was 76. Crook and his wife Fannie Marie Rogers were buried at the Fort Benning Main Post Cemetery. He had eight children and seventeen grandchildren.
