= Franz Frauenlob =

Austrian boxer

Personal information
- Nationality: Austrian
- Born: 11 August 1939 (age 85); Plainfeld, Nazi Germany

Sport
- Sport: Boxing

Franz Frauenlob (born 11 August 1939) is an Austrian boxer. He competed in the men's middleweight event at the 1964 Summer Olympics.

== 1964 Olympic results ==
Below is the record of Franz Frauenlob, an Austrian middleweight boxer who competed at the 1964 Tokyo Olympics:

- Round of 32: lost to Ahmed Hassan (Egypt) by decision, 0-5
