= Gerald Collins =

Australian rules footballer

Personal information
- Full name: Gerald Collins
- Born: 25 April 1932
- Died: 7 November 2003 (aged 71)
- Original team: Hughesdale
- Height: 191 cm (6 ft 3 in)
- Weight: 86 kg (190 lb)

Playing career^{1}
Years	Club	Games (Goals)
1952–53	Richmond	12 (6)
- ^{1} Playing statistics correct to the end of 1953.

Gerald Collins (25 April 1932 – 7 November 2003) was an Australian rules footballer who played with Richmond in the Victorian Football League (VFL).
