= Rychard Karpov =

Ukrainian boxer

Personal information
- Nationality: Ukrainian
- Born: 8 August 1931; Yevpatoria, Ukraine
- Died: 2 April 2012 (aged 80); Kyiv, Ukraine

Sport
- Sport: Boxing

Rychard Karpov (8 August 1931 – 2 April 2012) was a Ukrainian boxer. He competed in the men's light middleweight event at the 1956 Summer Olympics.
