= Luigi Napoleoni =

Italian boxer

Personal information
- Nationality: Italian
- Born: 3 May 1937; Rome, Italy
- Died: 10 September 2021 (aged 84)

Sport
- Sport: Boxing

Luigi Napoleoni (3 May 1937 – 10 September 2021) was an Italian boxer. He competed in the men's middleweight event at the 1960 Summer Olympics.
