= Colm McCoy =

Irish boxer

Personal information
- Nationality: Irish
- Born: 2 December 1936; Dublin, Ireland
- Died: 22 July 2010 (aged 73)

Sport
- Sport: Boxing

Colm McCoy (2 December 1936 – 22 July 2010) was an Irish boxer. He competed in the men's light heavyweight event at the 1960 Summer Olympics. At the 1960 Summer Olympics, he lost to Matti Aho of Finland by decision in the Round of 32.
