= Bernard Thébault =

French boxer

Personal information
- Nationality: French
- Born: 10 January 1943 (age 83) Argenteuil, France

Sport
- Sport: Boxing

Bernard Thébault (born 10 January 1943) is a French boxer. He competed in the men's light heavyweight event at the 1964 Summer Olympics.
