= Milo Sarens =

Belgian boxer (1937–2020)

Milo Saerens
Personal information
- Full name: Emiel Sarens
- Nationality: Belgian
- Born: 1 July 1937; Hombeek, Belgium
- Died: 18 June 2020 (aged 82); Mechelen, Belgium

Sport
- Sport: Boxing

Emiel "Milo" Sarens, sometimes written as Émile Saerens (1 July 1937 – 18 June 2020) was a Belgian boxer. Sarens competed in the men's middleweight event at the 1960 Summer Olympics, where he lost in the first round.

Sarens's career highlight came in a losing effort against Sugar Ray Robinson at Sportpaleis, Antwerp in 1963. Robinson was one of the best boxers at that time, yet needed eight rounds to win with a knock-out.

== 1960 Olympic results ==
Below is the record of Milo Sarens, a Belgian middleweight boxer who competed at the 1960 Rome Olympics:

- Round of 32: bye
- Round of 16: lost to Chang Lo-pu (Formosa) by decision, 1-4
