= František Poláček =

Czechoslovak boxer

Personal information
- Nationality: Czechoslovak
- Born: 20 January 1940
- Died: 11 November 2017 (aged 77); Munich, Germany

Sport
- Sport: Boxing

František Poláček (20 January 1940 – 11 November 2017) was a Czechoslovak boxer. He competed in the men's light heavyweight event at the 1964 Summer Olympics.

In the course of Prague Spring in 1968, Poláček emigrated to West Germany, where he lived until his death in November 2017.
