= Romualdas Murauskas =

Lithuanian boxer

Medal record

Men's Boxing

Representing Soviet Union

Olympic Games
Bronze medal – third place	1956 Melbourne	Light-heavyweight

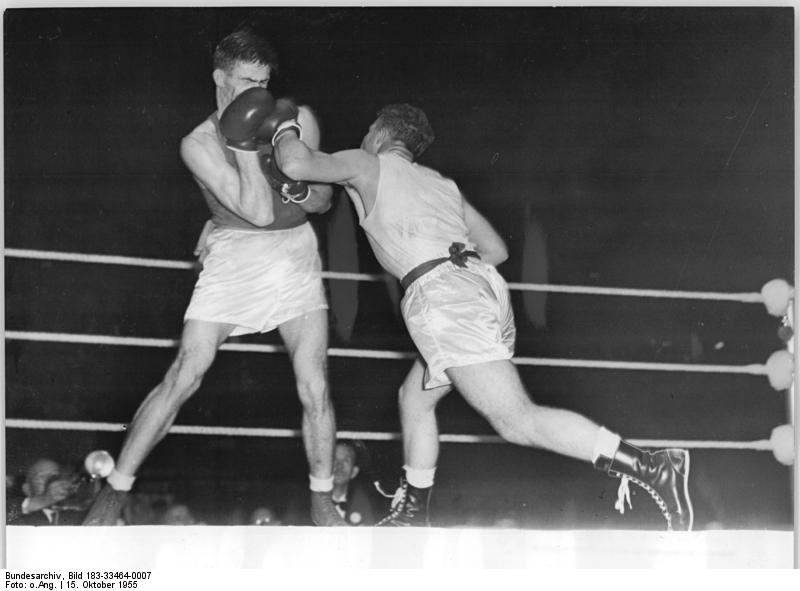
Bundesarchiv Bild 183-33464-0007, Murauskas, R. Redrup

Romualdas Murauskas (2 October 1934 in Kaunas, Lithuania – 23 May 1979) was a boxer from the Soviet Union. He competed for the USSR in the 1956 Summer Olympics held in Melbourne, Australia in the light-heavyweight event where he finished in third place.
