= Ottavio Panunzi =

Italian boxer

Personal information
- Nationality: Italian
- Born: 15 February 1933; Rome, Italy
- Died: 4 March 2015 (aged 82); Rome, Italy

Sport
- Sport: Boxing

Ottavio Panunzi (15 February 1933 – 4 March 2015) was an Italian boxer. He competed in the men's light heavyweight event at the 1956 Summer Olympics.
