= David Thomas (boxer) =

British boxer (1937–1980)

Dave Thomas
Personal information
- Nationality: British (English)
- Born: 29 August 1937 London, England
- Died: 31 October 1980 (aged 43)

Sport
- Sport: Boxing
Medal record
Boxing
Representing England
British Empire & Commonwealth Games
Silver medal – second place	1958 Cardiff	-91 Kg

David John Thomas (29 August 1937 – 31 October 1980) was a British boxer.

== Biography ==
Thomas competed in the men's heavyweight event at the 1960 Summer Olympics. At the 1960 Summer Olympics, he lost to Josef Němec of Czechoslovakia.

He also represented the England team during the boxing tournament at the 1958 British Empire and Commonwealth Games in Cardiff, Wales and won a silver medal in the -91 kg category.

Thomas was an Amateur Boxing Association of England three times heavyweight champion (1957, 1958, 1959) when boxing out of the Polytechnic Boxing Club.
