= Carlos Lucas =

Chilean boxer (1930–2022)

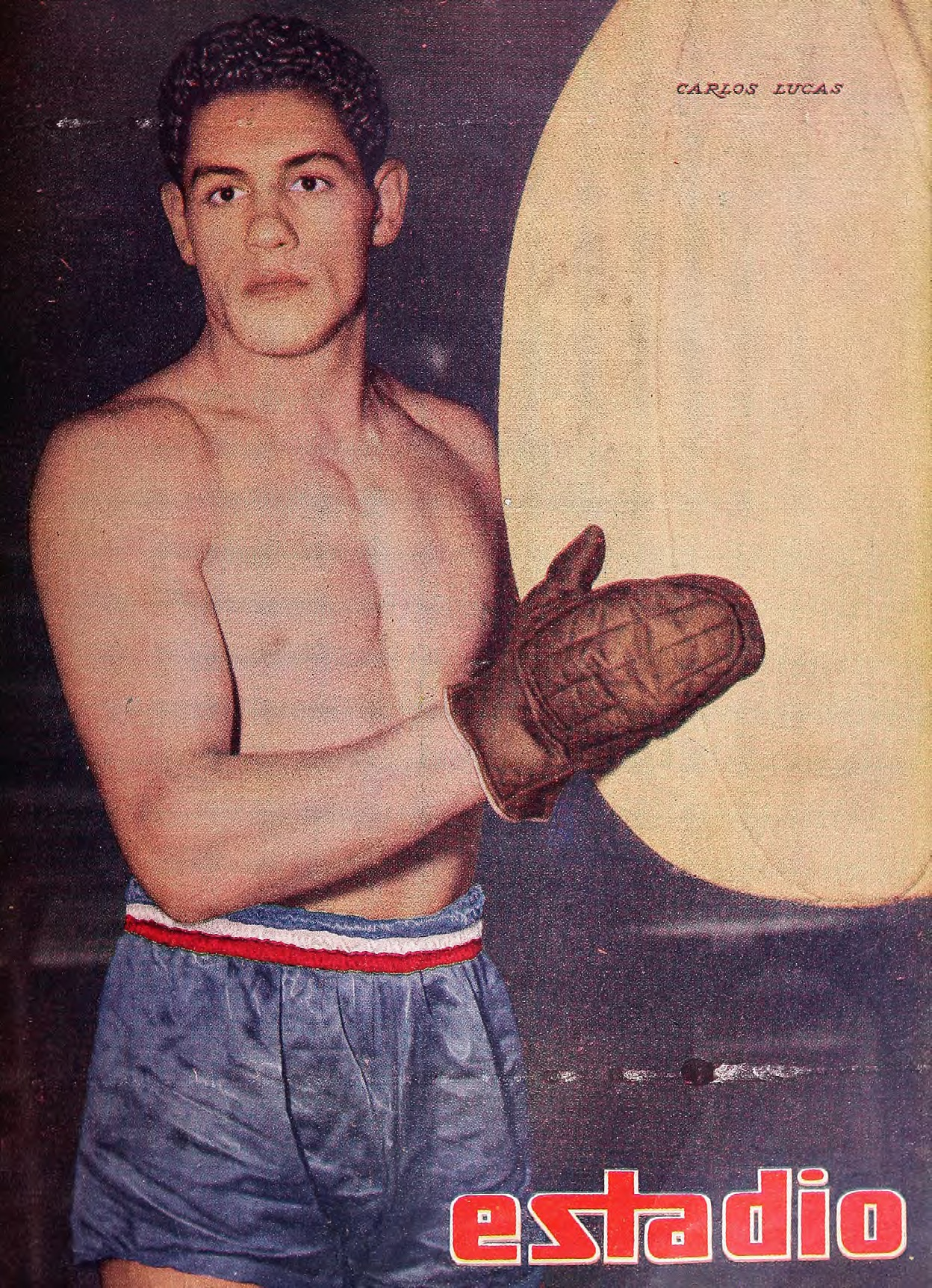
- Lucas in 1954

Personal information
- Born: 4 June 1930 Villarrica, Chile
- Died: 19 April 2022 (aged 91)
Medal record
Men's Boxing
Representing Chile
Olympic Games
Bronze medal – third place	1956 Melbourne	Light Heavyweight
Pan American Games
Bronze medal – third place	1959 Chicago	Light Heavyweight

Carlos Lucas Manríquez (4 June 1930 – 19 April 2022) was a Chilean boxer. He won the bronze medal in the light heavyweight division at the 1956 Summer Olympics in Melbourne, Australia. He also claimed the bronze in the same weight category at the 1959 Pan American Games in Chicago, United States.
