= Tadeusz Walasek =

Polish boxer

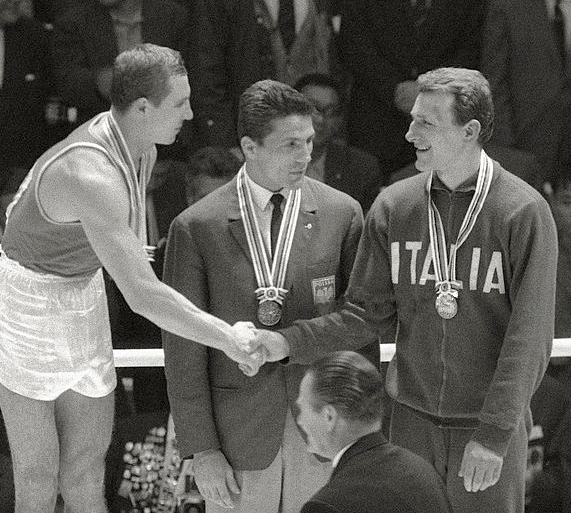
- Tadeusz Walasek (center) at the 1964 Olympics

Personal information
- Full name: Tadeusz Walasek
- Nationality: Polish
- Born: 15 July 1936 Elżbiecin, Łomża County, Podlaskie
- Died: 4 November 2011 (aged 75)
- Height: 1.76 m (5 ft 9 in)
- Weight: 76 kg (168 lb)

Sport
- Sport: Boxing
- Weight class: Middleweight
- Club: Gwardia Warszawa (Nysa, Kłodzko)
Medal record
Representing Poland
Event	1st	2nd	3rd
Olympic Games	0	1	1
World Championships	0	0	0
European Championships	1	2	0
Total	1	3	1
Olympic Games
Silver medal – second place	1960 Rome	Middleweight
Bronze medal – third place	1964 Tokyo	Middleweight
European Amateur Championships
Gold medal – first place	1961 Belgrade	Middleweight
Silver medal – second place	1957 Prague	Light middleweight
Silver medal – second place	1959 Lucerne	Middleweight

Tadeusz Walasek (15 July 1936 – 4 November 2011) was a Polish boxer. He competed at the 1956, 1960 and 1964 Olympics and won a silver medal in 1960 and a bronze in 1964, both in the middleweight division. In 1960 he lost the final bout to Eddie Crook by a narrow margin (2:3).

Walasek competed three times at the European Amateur Boxing Championships and won two silver medals, in 1957 in the light middleweight division and in 1959 in the middleweight category, and a gold medal in 1961 in the middleweight.

He was the winner of the Aleksander Reksza Boxing Award 1996.
