= Carl Crawford (boxer) =

Guyanese boxer

Personal information
- Born: 6 September 1935 Georgetown, British Guiana
- Died: 1 March 1999 (aged 63)
Medal record
Men's Boxing
Representing British Guiana
Pan American Games
Bronze medal – third place	1959 Chicago	Middleweight
Central American and Caribbean Games
Silver medal – second place	1962 Kingston	Light-heavyweight

Carl Crawford (6 September 1935 – 1 March 1999) was a Guyanese light-heavyweight boxer, who represented his country at the 1960 Summer Olympics. He was in fact the first boxer to compete for Guyana in the Olympics. There he was eliminated in the first round of the men's light-heavyweight division by Zbigniew Pietrzykowski of Poland, he then became sparring partner for Muhammad Ali.

Crawford won a bronze medal at the 1959 Pan American Games in the middleweight class, defeating Robert Piau of Canada in his first bout before being eliminated by Bob Foster of the United States. Crawford then won the third place bout versus Rafael Toro of Venezuela. Crawford also competed at the 1963 Pan American Games in the light heavyweight category and won a silver medal in that category at the 1962 Central American and Caribbean Games.

He was honored with Guyana's Sportsman-of-the-Year award in 1959.

Crawford died in 1999, due to Colon cancer.

== Olympic results ==
Represented British Guiana as a Light-heavyweight at the 1960 Olympic Games.

- Round of 32: lost to Zbigniew Pietrzykowski (Poland) by decision, 0-5
