= CSA Steaua București (athletics) =

Athletics club

- Full name: Clubul Sportiv al Armatei Steaua București
- Nickname: Steliștii; Roș-albaștrii (The Blue and Reds); Militarii (The Militaries)
- Founded: 1947
- Based in: Bucharest, Romania
- Colors
- President: Cristian Petrea
- Website: Club home page

The CSA Steaua București Athletics section was created in 1947.

== Achievements ==
Competitions	Gold	Silver	Bronze	Total
Summer Olympic Games	4	1	3	8
World Championships	3	5	7	15
European Championships	15	17	9	39
Universiade / World University Championships	11	8	8	27
World Cup / European Cup	0	8	3	11
CISM / Spartakiad	8	18	18	44
Balkan Games	243	169	142	554

Competition		Winner
Romanian Championships	Seniors	655
Romanian Championships	Youths	239
Romanian Championships	Juniors	151
Romanian Cups		16

== Notable athletes ==
- (Romania) Dumitru Tălmaciu
- (Romania) Victor Dumitrescu
- (Romania) Ioan Söter
- (Romania) Mihai Romică
- (Romania) Constantin Aioanei
- (Romania) Romeo Coveianu
- (Romania) Zoltán Szabó
- (Romania) Aurel Raica
- (Romania) Sorin Ioan
- (Romania) Iolanda Balaș
- (Romania) Viorica Viscopoleanu
- (Romania) Carol Corbu
- (Romania) Natalia Andrei
- (Romania) Anișoara Cușmir-Stanciu
- (Romania) Florența Crăciunescu
- (Romania) Ella Kovacs
- (Romania) (Germany) Galina Astafei
- (Romania) Liliana Năstase
- (Romania) George Boroi
- (Romania) Monica Iagăr-Dinescu
- (Romania) Cristina Nicolau
- (Romania) Oana Pantelimon
- (Romania) Bogdan Tudor
- (Romania) Elena Iagăr-Buhăianu
- (Romania) Ștefan Vasilache

== Coaches ==
- (Romania) Petre Gheorghe Zâmbreșteanu
- (Romania) Andrei Nagy
- (Romania) Silviu Dumitrescu
- (Romania) Alexandru Bizim
- (Romania) Nicolae Mărășescu
- (Romania) Dan Serafim
- (Romania) Ioan Sabău
- (Romania) Constantin Dumitrescu
- (Romania) Doru Crișan
- (Romania) Constantin Nourescu
- (Romania) Corina Barbu
- (Romania) Constantin Mihail
