= Yevgeny Feofanov =

Russian boxer (1937–2000)

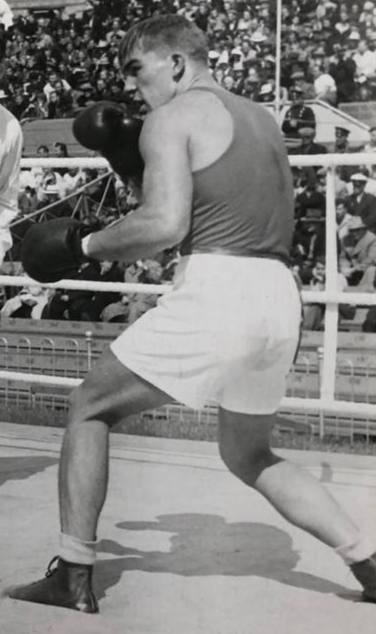

Medal record

Men's Boxing

Representing Soviet Union

Olympic Games
Bronze medal – third place	1960 Rome	Middleweight

European Amateur Championships
Silver medal – second place	1961 Belgrade	Middleweight

Yevgeny Feofanov (29 April 1937 – 29 March 2000) was a boxer from the Soviet Union. He was born in Moscow, Russia. He competed for the Soviet Union in the 1960 Summer Olympics held in Rome, Italy in the middleweight event where he finished in third place.
