= Hans Büchi =

Swiss boxer (1929–2024)

Personal information
- Nationality: Swiss
- Born: 16 May 1929; Schlatt, Switzerland
- Died: 27 August 2023 (aged 94)

Sport
- Sport: Boxing

Hans Büchi (16 May 1929 – 27 August 2023) was a Swiss boxer. He competed at the 1952 Summer Olympics and the 1960 Summer Olympics. Büchi died on 27 August 2023, at the age of 94.
