= Ian McKenzie (boxer) =

Scottish boxer

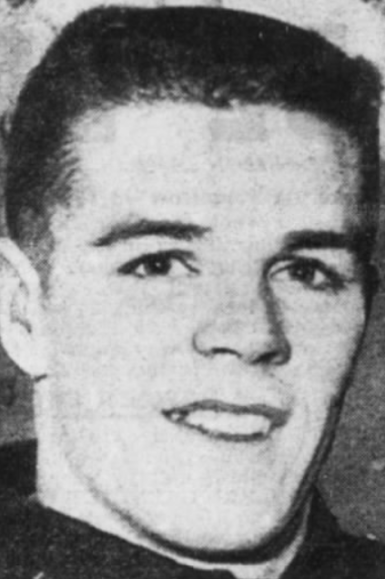
- McKenzie in 1961

Personal information
- Nationality: Scotland
- Born: 1941 or 1942 (age 84–85)

Boxing career
Medal record
Men's amateur boxing
Representing Scotland
European Championships
| Bronze medal – third place | 1961 Belgrade | Welterweight |

Ian McKenzie (born 1941/1942) is a Scottish boxer. An electrician, he competed at the 1961 European Amateur Boxing Championships, winning the bronze medal in the welterweight event.
