= Obrad Sretenović =

Croatian boxer

Personal information
- Nationality: Serbian
- Born: 2 September 1935; Marino Selo, Lipik, Yugoslavia
- Died: 14 January 2015 (aged 79); Pančevo, Serbia

Sport
- Sport: Boxing

Obrad Sretenović (2 September 1935 – 14 January 2015) was a Yugoslavian boxer. He competed in the men's heavyweight event at the 1960 Summer Olympics.
