= Ron Taylor (footballer) =

Australian rules footballer

Personal information
- Full name: Ronald James Taylor
- Born: 20 July 1932
- Died: 4 February 2015 (aged 82)
- Original team: Middle Park
- Height: 188 cm (6 ft 2 in)
- Weight: 86 kg (190 lb)

Playing career^{1}
Years	Club	Games (Goals)
1953–56	South Melbourne	22 (13)
1958	St Kilda	4 (0)
Total		26 (13)
- ^{1} Playing statistics correct to the end of 1958.

Ronald James Taylor (20 July 1932 – 4 February 2015) was an Australian rules footballer who played with South Melbourne and St Kilda in the Victorian Football League (VFL).

Taylor made his debut as a 20-year-old in 1953 but didn't have a full season until 1955, when he managed 15 games. In 1955 he kicked three goals in a game against Essendon at Windy Hill.

He was more successful as an amateur boxer, winning the Australian heavyweight title in 1959. This effort saw him represent Australia at the 1960 Rome Olympics, in the heavyweight division. Taylor was eliminated after being KO'd in the Preliminaries by American Percy Price.

== 1960 Olympic results ==
Below is the record of Ron Taylor, an Australian heavyweight boxer who competed at the 1960 Rome Olympics:

- Round of 32: bye
- Round of 16: lost to Percy Price (United States) by second-round knockout
