= Lars-Olof Norling =

Swedish boxer

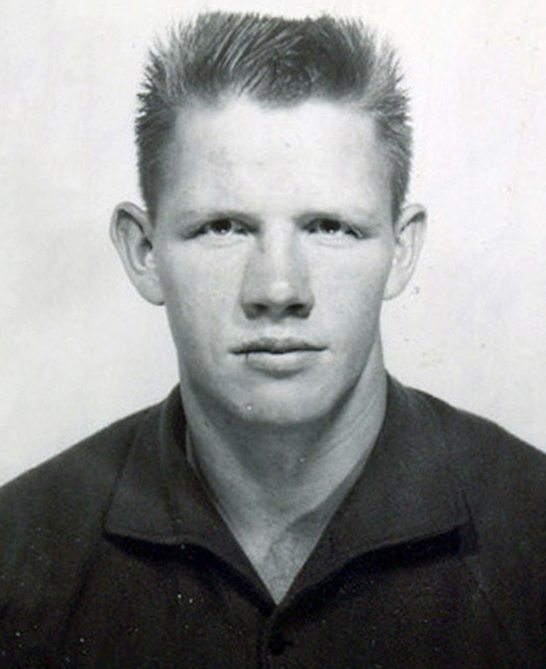

Personal information
- Born: 30 September 1935 (age 90) Traryd, Sweden
- Height: 190 cm (6 ft 3 in)

Sport
- Sport: Boxing
- Club: Stockholms AIF

Lars-Olof Norling (born 30 September 1935) is a retired Swedish light heavyweight boxer. He competed at the 1960 Summer Olympics, but was eliminated in the second round.

== 1960 Olympic results ==
Below is the record of Lars-Olof Norling, a Swedish light heavyweight boxer who competed at the 1960 Rome Olympics:

- Round of 32: bye
- Round of 16: lost to Tony Madigan (Australia) by decision, 0–5
