= Vasile Mariuțan =

Romanian boxer (1935–1999)

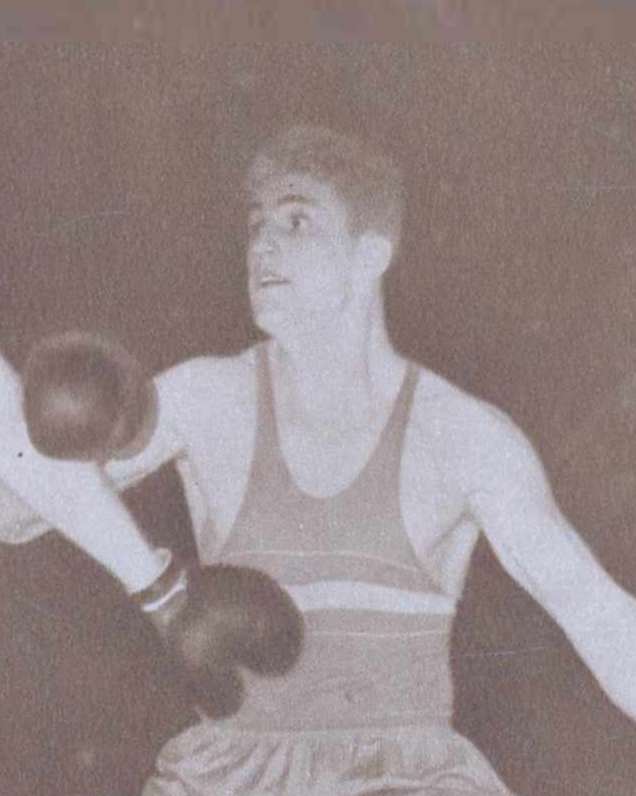

Personal information
- Nationality: Romanian
- Born: 8 March 1935 Hotin, Romania
- Died: 14 July 1999 (aged 64) Ovidiu, Romania

Sport
- Sport: Boxing
Medal record
Representing Romania
Romania National Amateur Boxing Championships
Silver medal – second place	1955 Bucharest	Heavyweight
Silver medal – second place	1956 Bucharest	Heavyweight
Silver medal – second place	1957 Bucharest	Heavyweight
Gold medal – first place	1958 Bucharest	Heavyweight
Gold medal – first place	1959 Bucharest	Heavyweight
Gold medal – first place	1960 Bucharest	Heavyweight
Gold medal – first place	1961 Bucharest	Heavyweight
Gold medal – first place	1962 Bucharest	Heavyweight
Gold medal – first place	1963 Bucharest	Heavyweight
Silver medal – second place	1964 Bucharest	Heavyweight
Gold medal – first place	1965 Bucharest	Heavyweight
Gold medal – first place	1966 Bucharest	Heavyweight
Silver medal – second place	1967 Bucharest	Heavyweight
European Amateur Championships
Silver medal – second place	1957 Prague	Heavyweight

Vasile Mariuțan (8 March 1935 – 14 July 1999) was a Romanian boxer. He competed at the 1960 Summer Olympics and the 1964 Summer Olympics.
