= Rafael Gargiulo =

Argentine boxer (born 1936)

Personal information
- Born: 24 October 1936 (age 89) Buenos Aires, Argentina

Sport
- Sport: Boxing
Medal record
Men's amateur boxing
Representing Argentina
Pan American Games
Silver medal – second place	1959 Chicago	Light heavyweight

Rafael Gargiulo (born 24 October 1936) is an Argentine boxer. He competed at the 1960 Summer Olympics and the 1964 Summer Olympics. At the 1964 Summer Olympics, he defeated Bela Istvan Horvath of Switzerland before losing to Zbigniew Pietrzykowski of Poland.
