= Gheorghe Negrea =

Romanian boxer (1934–2000)

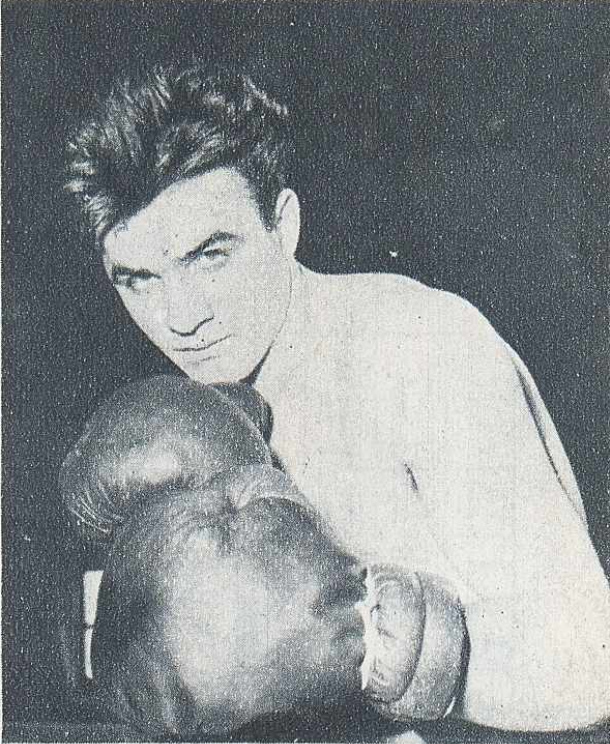

Personal information
- Nationality: Romanian
- Born: 21 April 1934 Sibiu, Romania
- Died: 2000 (aged 65–66)

Sport
- Sport: Boxing
Medal record
Men's Boxing
Representing Romania
Romania National Amateur Boxing Championships
Gold medal – first place	1955 Bucharest	Light Heavyweight
Gold medal – first place	1956 Bucharest	Light Heavyweight
Gold medal – first place	1957 Bucharest	Light Heavyweight
Gold medal – first place	1958 Bucharest	Light Heavyweight
Gold medal – first place	1960 Bucharest	Light Heavyweight
Gold medal – first place	1961 Bucharest	Light Heavyweight
Gold medal – first place	1964 Bucharest	Heavyweight
Olympic Games
Silver medal – second place	1956 Melbourne	Light-heavyweight
European Amateur Championships
Gold medal – first place	1957 Prague	Light Heavyweight
Silver medal – second place	1959 Lucerne	Light Heavyweight
Silver medal – second place	1961 Belgrade	Light Heavyweight

Gheorghe Negrea (21 April 1934 – 2000) was a boxer from Romania.

He competed for Romania in the 1956 Summer Olympics held in Melbourne, Australia in the light heavyweight event where he finished in second place. He also competed in the 1960 Olympic boxing tournament in Rome, again in the light heavyweight division. He was defeated in his quarterfinal match by Anthony Madigan of Australia.

== 1960 Olympic results ==
Below are the results of Gheorge Negrea, a light heavyweight boxer from Romania who competed in the 1960 Rome Olympics:

- Round of 32: bye
- Round of 16: defeated George Oywello (Uganda) by decision, 5-0
- Quarterfinal: lost to Anthony Madigan (Australia) by a second-round knockout
