= Władysław Jędrzejewski (boxer) =

Polish boxer (1935–2012)

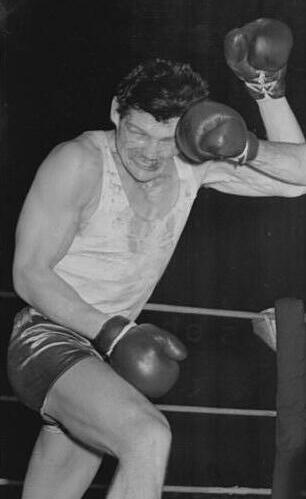
- Jędrzejewski in 1963

Personal information
- Nationality: Polish
- Born: 23 April 1935 Zawiercie, Poland
- Died: 11 November 2012 (aged 77) Kraków, Poland

Sport
- Sport: Boxing

Władysław Jędrzejewski (23 April 1935 – 11 November 2012) was a Polish boxer. He competed at the 1960 Summer Olympics and the 1964 Summer Olympics.
