= Andrey Abramov (boxer) =

Russian boxer (1935–1995)

Andrey Vasilievich Abramov (Russian: Андре́й Васи́льевич Абра́мов; 5 December 1935 – 4 May 1995) was a Russian boxer from the Soviet Union. He competed in the men's heavyweight event at the 1960 Summer Olympics. He won three gold medals at the European Amateur Boxing Championships: at Prague 1957, Lucerne 1959, Belgrade 1961, and silver one at Moscow 1963, all in the Heavyweight division.
