= Petar Spasov =

Bulgarian boxer

Personal information
- Nationality: Bulgarian
- Born: 13 March 1934 (age 91); Sofia, Bulgaria

Sport
- Sport: Boxing

Petar Spasov (born 13 March 1934) is a Bulgarian boxer. He competed at the 1952 Summer Olympics and the 1960 Summer Olympics.
