= Josef Němec =

Czechoslovak boxer (1933–2013)

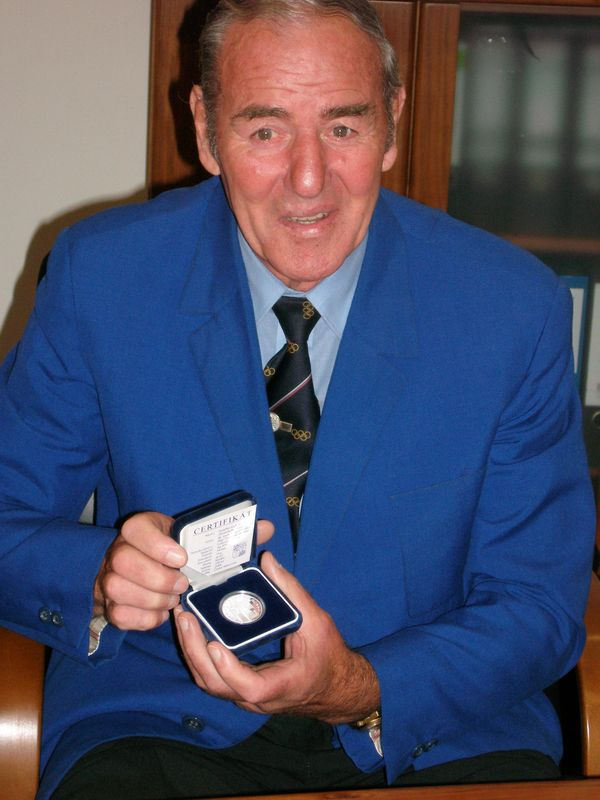

Medal record

Men's Boxing

Representing Czechoslovakia

Olympic Games
Bronze medal – third place	1960 Rome	Heavyweight

European Championship
Bronze medal – third place	1957 Prague	Heavyweight
Bronze medal – third place	1959 Lucerne	Heavyweight
Gold medal – first place	1963 Moscow	Heavyweight

Josef Němec (25 September 1933 – 10 September 2013) was a boxer from Czechoslovakia.

Born in České Budějovice, Czechoslovakia, he competed in the 1956 Summer Olympics held in Melbourne, Australia, going out in the quarter-finals of the heavyweight event. He returned to the 1960 Summer Olympics held in Rome, Italy, again as a heavyweight boxer where he went one better, going out in the semi-final to finish in third place. In Moscow 1963 he became European champion.

Němec died in České Budějovice on 10 September 2013, aged 79.
