= Dragoslav Jakovljević =

Serbian boxer

Personal information
- Nationality: Serbian
- Born: 4 May 1932; Kragujevac, Yugoslavia
- Died: 6 March 2012 (aged 79)

Sport
- Sport: Boxing

Dragoslav Jakovljević (4 May 1932 – 6 March 2012) was a Serbian boxer. He competed in the men's light middleweight event at the 1960 Summer Olympics.
