= Angel Robinson Garcia =

Cuban boxer (1937–2000)

Personal information
- Born: Angel Robinson Garcia; May 9, 1937 Havana, Cuba
- Died: June 1, 2000 (aged 63)
- Weight: Junior welterweight

Boxing career

Boxing record
- Total fights: 239
- Wins: 138
- Win by KO: 55
- Losses: 80
- Draws: 21

Angel Robinson Garcia (May 9, 1937 – June 1, 2000) was a Cuban professional boxer, who was the Latin American Super-Featherweight champion. He also fought for the Cuban national Lightweight title, but lost.

Robinson Garcia was known for his large number of professional fights-he fought 237 times-the quality of opponents he faced and number of countries he visited. Robinson Garcia competed against 42 boxers who were world ranked, 16 world champions, 6 International Boxing Hall of Fame members, in 19 countries and 4 continents. Many of the places he fought at, like France, the United States and Italy, were visited very often by Robinson Garcia.

== Life away from boxing ==
According to Ferdie Pacheco, Robinson Garcia once told him that he spent 6 months in an Italian jail for beating up a woman.

Cuban boxing expert Enrique Encinosa said that Robinson Garcia returned to Paris, living as a homeless man there before Fidel Castro allowed him to return to Cuba and spend his last days at the Caribbean country. Also according to Encinosa, Robinson Garcia was once married in Paris.

== Professional boxing record ==
239 fights	138 wins	80 losses
By knockout	55	3
By decision	82	76
By disqualification	1	1
Draws	21	

No.	Result	Record	Opponent	Type	Round	Date	Location	Notes
239	Win	138–80–21	Pol Payen	PTS	10	Feb 25, 1978	La Louvière, Belgium	
238	Loss	137–80–21	Jean Symos	PTS	10	Jan 6, 1978	Grivegnee, Belgium	
237	Loss	137–79–21	Edgar Wallace	UD	10	Aug 22, 1977	Civic Plaza, Phoenix, Arizona, US	
236	Win	137–78–21	Hector Perez	TKO	6 (10)	Mar 25, 1977	Sunnyside Garden, New York City, New York, US	
235	Loss	136–78–21	Ralph Palladin	UD	10	Feb 5, 1977	Civic Center, Baltimore, Maryland, US	
234	Loss	136–77–21	Willie Monroe	TKO	7 (10), 3:00	Dec 3, 1976	War Memorial Auditorium, Rochester, New York, US	
233	Draw	136–76–21	Justice Ortiz	SD	10	Sep 24, 1976	Sunnyside Garden, New York City, New York, US	
232	Loss	136–76–20	Clyde Gray	UD	10	Sep 2, 1976	Halifax, Canada	
231	Win	136–75–20	Perry Abney	RTD	9 (10)	Jul 28, 1976	Wagner Ballroom, Philadelphia, Pennsylvania, US	
230	Loss	135–75–20	Rafael Rodriguez	UD	10	May 5, 1976	Auditorium, Minneapolis, Minnesota, US	
229	Loss	135–74–20	Billy Backus	UD	10	Apr 3, 1976	War Memorial Auditorium, Utica, New York, US	
228	Loss	135–73–20	Pat O'Connor	UD	10	Jan 22, 1976	St. Paul Armory, Saint Paul, Minnesota, US	
227	Draw	135–72–20	Randy Armstrong	PTS	8	Nov 29, 1975	Convention Center, Miami Beach, Florida, US	
226	Win	135–72–19	Jerry Hill	KO	1 (?), 1:32	Nov 15, 1975	Convention Center, Miami Beach, Florida, US	
225	Loss	134–72–19	Adriano Marrero	UD	10	Aug 5, 1975	Convention Center, Miami Beach, Florida, US	
224	Loss	134–71–19	Wilfred Benítez	PTS	10	Jun 9, 1975	Ramon Loubriel Stadium, San Juan, Puerto Rico	
223	Loss	134–70–19	Larry Bonds	UD	10	Feb 26, 1975	Silver Slipper, Las Vegas, Nevada, US	
222	Loss	134–69–19	Miguel Mayan	UD	10	Jan 22, 1975	Silver Slipper, Las Vegas, Nevada, US	
221	Win	134–68–19	Tony Martinez	KO	7 (10), 2:07	Dec 5, 1974	Silver Slipper, Las Vegas, Nevada, US	
220	Win	133–68–19	Frank Kolovart	KO	3 (10), 2:32	Aug 26, 1974	Silver Slipper, Las Vegas, Nevada, US	
219	Win	132–68–19	Frank Young	SD	10	Jul 30, 1974	Music Theatre, Houston, Texas, US	
218	Loss	131–68–19	Johnny Gant	UD	10	Jul 18, 1974	Steelworkers Hall, Baltimore, Maryland, US	
217	Win	131–67–19	Rocky Ayon	KO	1 (10)	Jul 1, 1974	Community Center, Tucson, Arizona, US	
216	Loss	130–67–19	Eddie Perkins	UD	10	Apr 27, 1974	Community Center, Tucson, Arizona, US	
215	Win	130–66–19	Arturo Leon	SD	6	Apr 18, 1974	Sahara Tahoe Hotel, Stateline, Nevada, US	
214	Win	129–66–19	Camilio de la Rosa	TKO	5 (10)	Mar 20, 1974	Circus Circus Hippodrome Theater, Las Vegas, Nevada, US	
213	Loss	128–66–19	Josue Marquez	PTS	10	Feb 18, 1974	San Juan, Puerto Rico	
212	Loss	128–65–19	Sugar Ray Seales	UD	10	Feb 13, 1974	Circus Circus Hippodrome Theater, Las Vegas, Nevada, US	
211	Win	128–64–19	Marcos Geraldo	KO	4 (10), 0:48	Jan 23, 1974	Circus Circus Hippodrome Theater, Las Vegas, Nevada, US	
210	Win	127–64–19	Omar Chavez	SD	10	Jan 10, 1974	Sahara Tahoe, High Sierra Theatre, Stateline, Nevada, US	
209	Loss	126–64–19	Rocky Cudney	UD	10	Dec 12, 1973	Circus Circus Hippodrome Theater, Las Vegas, Nevada, US	
208	Win	126–63–19	Jose Miranda	UD	10	Sep 19, 1973	Circus Circus Hippodrome Theater, Las Vegas, Nevada, US	
207	Win	125–63–19	Fermin Guzman	UD	10	Aug 21, 1973	Auditorium, Miami Beach, Florida, US	
206	Loss	124–63–19	Saoul Mamby	UD	10	Jul 17, 1973	Auditorium, Miami Beach, Florida, US	
205	Win	124–62–19	Rafael Jimenez	TKO	8 (10), 1:45	Jul 3, 1973	Auditorium, Miami Beach, Florida, US	
204	Win	123–62–19	Rafael Jimenez	RTD	4 (10)	Jun 26, 1973	Auditorium, Miami Beach, Florida, US	
203	Loss	122–62–19	Sandy Torres	SD	10	Mar 29, 1973	Fort Homer Hesterly Armory, Tampa, Florida, US	
202	Loss	122–61–19	Jerome Dowe	SD	10	Mar 1, 1973	Curtis Hixon Hall, Tampa, Florida, US	
201	Win	122–60–19	Prince Jimmy Hamm	SD	10	Nov 28, 1972	Auditorium, Miami Beach, Florida, US	
200	Loss	121–60–19	Jose Peterson	PTS	10	Aug 8, 1972	Hiram Bithorn Stadium, San Juan, Puerto Rico	
199	Loss	121–59–19	Esteban de Jesús	PTS	10	Jul 8, 1972	San Juan, Puerto Rico	
198	Loss	121–58–19	Cemal Kamaci	UD	10	Jun 5, 1972	Felt Forum, New York City, New York, US	
197	Loss	121–57–19	Ramon Reyes	PTS	10	Apr 28, 1972	Maracaibo, Venezuela	
196	Loss	121–56–19	Roberto Durán	UD	10	Jan 15, 1972	Gimnasio Nuevo Panama, Panama City, Panama	
195	Loss	121–55–19	Jonathan Dele	PTS	8	Dec 15, 1971	Gran Price, Barcelona, Spain	
194	Win	121–54–19	Leonardo Dessi'	TKO	9 (10)	Oct 10, 1971	Lyon, France	
193	Loss	120–54–19	Robert Gallois	PTS	10	Oct 1, 1971	Marseille, France	
192	Loss	120–53–19	Marco Scano	PTS	10	Sep 2, 1971	Cagliari, Italy	
191	Draw	120–52–19	John White	PTS	8	Aug 27, 1971	Avilés, Spain	
190	Loss	120–52–18	José Hernández	PTS	8	Aug 10, 1971	Plaza de Toros de Vista Alegre, Bilbao, Spain	
189	Draw	120–51–18	José Hernández	PTS	10	Jul 18, 1971	Plaza de Toros Portatil, Carballo, Spain	
188	Loss	120–51–17	Chris Fernandez	PTS	10	Jul 2, 1971	Palacio de los Deportes de Riazor, La Coruna, Spain	
187	Loss	120–50–17	Jose Gonzalez Dopico	PTS	10	Jun 12, 1971	Palacio de los Deportes de Riazor, La Coruna, Spain	
186	Draw	120–49–17	Miguel Velazquez	PTS	10	May 21, 1971	Gran Price, Barcelona, Spain	
185	Draw	120–49–16	Francis Vermandere	PTS	10	May 8, 1971	Béthune, France	
184	Win	120–49–15	Bunny Grant	PTS	10	Apr 5, 1971	Palais des Sports, Paris, France	
183	Win	119–49–15	Angel Neches	TKO	5 (10)	Mar 12, 1971	Pabellón de La Casilla, Bilbao, Spain	
182	Win	118–49–15	Joe Tetteh	PTS	10	Feb 11, 1971	Gran Price, Barcelona, Spain	
181	Win	117–49–15	Garibaldi Pereira	PTS	10	Jan 29, 1971	Geneva, Switzerland	
180	Loss	116–49–15	Antonio Ortiz	PTS	8	Dec 30, 1970	Gran Price, Barcelona, Spain	
179	Win	116–48–15	Jose Gonzalez Dopico	PTS	8	Dec 19, 1970	Palacio de los Deportes de Riazor, La Coruna, Spain	
178	Win	115–48–15	Pablo Sanchez	TKO	6 (8)	Dec 11, 1970	Gran Price, Barcelona, Spain	
177	Win	114–48–15	Mathias Rosenitsch	PTS	8	Nov 27, 1970	Germany	
176	Loss	113–48–15	Roger Menetrey	PTS	10	Nov 20, 1970	Geneva, Switzerland	
175	Win	113–47–15	Jonathan Dele	PTS	8	Nov 6, 1970	Gran Price, Barcelona, Spain	
174	Win	112–47–15	Angel Ejarque	PTS	8	Oct 10, 1970	Gimnasio Polideportivo, Zaragoza, Spain	
173	Win	111–47–15	Enrique Levy	PTS	8	Oct 3, 1970	Madrid, Spain	
172	Loss	110–47–15	José Durán	PTS	10	Aug 21, 1970	Campo del Gas, Madrid, Spain	
171	Loss	110–46–15	Jonathan Dele	PTS	8	Jun 22, 1970	Plaza de Toros Monumental, Barcelona, Spain	
170	Loss	110–45–15	José Hernández	PTS	8	May 21, 1970	Gran Price, Barcelona, Spain	
169	Win	110–44–15	Eduardo Batista	PTS	8	Apr 30, 1970	Gran Price, Barcelona, Spain	
168	Loss	109–44–15	Silvano Bertini	PTS	8	Apr 18, 1970	Palazzetto dello Sport, Bologna, Italy	
167	Win	109–43–15	Maurice Plouvier	PTS	8	Mar 18, 1970	Valencia, Spain	
166	Win	108–43–15	Bobby Arthur	PTS	8	Mar 7, 1970	Pabellón del Centro Deportivo Municipal, Vigo, Spain	
165	Win	107–43–15	Chuck Henderson	PTS	10	Feb 5, 1970	Palacio de los Deportes, Barcelona, Spain	
164	Loss	106–43–15	Cemal Kamaci	PTS	8	Jan 26, 1970	Stadthalle, Vienna, Austria	
163	Loss	106–42–15	Chris Fernandez	PTS	10	Dec 30, 1969	Palacio de los Deportes, Barcelona, Spain	
162	Win	106–41–15	Jose Luis Vallejo	TKO	6 (10)	Dec 11, 1969	Palacio de los Deportes, Barcelona, Spain	
161	Win	105–41–15	Antonio Ortiz	PTS	8	Nov 20, 1969	Gran Price, Barcelona, Spain	
160	Draw	104–41–15	Jose Hernandez	PTS	8	Nov 13, 1969	Gran Price, Barcelona, Spain	
159	Win	104–41–14	Antonio Torres	TKO	7 (10)	Nov 6, 1969	Gran Price, Barcelona, Spain	
158	Loss	103–41–14	Carlos San Jose	PTS	10	Oct 10, 1969	Plaza de Toros de Vista Alegre, Bilbao, Spain	
157	Win	103–40–14	Antonio Ortiz	PTS	10	Sep 27, 1969	Valencia, Spain	
156	Loss	102–40–14	Pedro Carrasco	PTS	10	Sep 10, 1969	Plaza de Toros de Vista Alegre, Bilbao, Spain	
155	Win	102–39–14	John White	PTS	10	Aug 6, 1969	Plaza de Toros de Vista Alegre, Bilbao, Spain	
154	Loss	101–39–14	Antonio Ortiz	PTS	8	Jul 11, 1969	Campo del Gas, Madrid, Spain	
153	Draw	101–38–14	Antonio Ortiz	PTS	8	Jun 13, 1969	Palacio de los Deportes, Madrid, Spain	
152	Loss	101–38–13	John White	PTS	10	Jun 6, 1969	Abidjan, Ivory Coast	
151	Loss	101–37–13	Ken Buchanan	PTS	10	Oct 23, 1968	Grosvenor House, Mayfair, England, UK	
150	Win	101–36–13	Billy Lloyd	PTS	10	Oct 5, 1968	Genoa, Italy	
149	Draw	100–36–13	Paul Armstead	PTS	10	Jul 28, 1968	San Remo, Italy	
148	Win	100–36–12	Paul Armstead	PTS	10	Jun 21, 1968	Milan, Italy	
147	Loss	99–36–12	Paul Armstead	PTS	10	May 10, 1968	Viareggio, Italy	
146	Win	99–35–12	LC Morgan	TKO	9 (10)	Apr 19, 1968	Rome, Italy	
145	Win	98–35–12	Oscar Miranda	KO	5 (10)	Apr 6, 1968	Genoa, Italy	
144	Draw	97–35–12	LC Morgan	PTS	10	Mar 22, 1968	Rome, Italy	
143	Win	97–35–11	Joe Africa	TKO	9 (10)	Feb 24, 1968	Reggio Emilia, Italy	
142	Loss	96–35–11	Cyclone Barth	PTS	10	Dec 26, 1967	Reggio Emilia, Italy	
141	Loss	96–34–11	Eddie Perkins	PTS	10	Dec 5, 1967	Milan, Italy	
140	Win	96–33–11	Aldo Battistutta	TKO	4 (10)	Nov 17, 1967	Rome, Italy	
139	Loss	95–33–11	Børge Krogh	PTS	10	Oct 5, 1967	K.B. Hallen, Copenhagen, Denmark	
138	Win	95–32–11	Giampiero Salami	TKO	6 (10)	Aug 16, 1967	San Remo, Italy	
137	Win	94–32–11	Mario Sitri	RTD	3 (10)	Aug 4, 1967	Lavagna, Italy	
136	Loss	93–32–11	Carmelo Bossi	TKO	5 (10)	Jul 14, 1967	Palazzetto dello Sport, Rome, Italy	
135	Win	93–31–11	Giuseppe Occhipinti	PTS	8	Jul 5, 1967	Arenzano, Italy	
134	Win	92–31–11	Joe Africa	TKO	9 (10)	Jun 3, 1967	Genoa, Italy	
133	Loss	91–31–11	Bruno Arcari	PTS	10	Apr 28, 1967	Genoa, Italy	
132	Draw	91–30–11	Andrés Navarro	PTS	10	Nov 26, 1966	Pabellón de la Feria de Muestras, Bilbao, Spain	
131	Draw	91–30–10	Oscar Miranda	PTS	10	Oct 27, 1966	Gran Price, Barcelona, Spain	
130	Win	91–30–9	Cesáreo Barrera	PTS	10	Oct 15, 1966	Estadio Insular, Las Palmas, Spain	
129	Win	90–30–9	Manuel Prieto	TKO	5 (10)	Oct 6, 1966	Gran Price, Barcelona, Spain	
128	Win	89–30–9	Antonio Coria	TKO	2 (8)	Sep 18, 1966	Almería, Spain	
127	Loss	88–30–9	Eduardo Batista	PTS	10	Sep 3, 1966	Velódromo de Anoeta, San Sebastián, Spain	
126	Win	88–29–9	Francisco Ferri	TKO	6 (10)	Aug 20, 1966	Velódromo de Anoeta, San Sebastián, Spain	
125	Win	87–29–9	Vicente Ferrando	KO	5 (10)	Aug 13, 1966	Almería, Spain	
124	Draw	86–29–9	Andrés Navarro	PTS	10	Jul 29, 1966	Plaza de Toros de Las Arenas, Barcelona, Spain	
123	Win	86–29–8	Eduardo Batista	PTS	10	Jun 17, 1966	Plaza de Toros de Vista Alegre, Bilbao, Spain	
122	Win	85–29–8	Tony Falcon	KO	7 (10)	May 28, 1966	Pabellón Municipal de Deportes, Salamanca, Spain	
121	Win	84–29–8	Francisco Ferri	PTS	10	May 21, 1966	Plaza de Toros de Las Arenas, Barcelona, Spain	
120	Loss	83–29–8	John White	PTS	10	Apr 30, 1966	Algiers, Algeria	
119	Draw	83–28–8	Carmelo Bossi	PTS	10	Apr 21, 1966	Gran Price, Barcelona, Spain	
118	Win	83–28–7	Kid Tano	RTD	6 (10)	Apr 10, 1966	Estadio Insular, Las Palmas, Spain	
117	Win	82–28–7	Vicente Ferrando	PTS	10	Mar 18, 1966	Palacio de los Deportes, Madrid, Spain	
116	Draw	81–28–7	Vicente Ferrando	PTS	8	Mar 10, 1966	Gran Price, Barcelona, Spain	
115	Loss	81–28–6	Maurice Cullen	PTS	10	Feb 22, 1966	Royal Albert Hall, Kensington, England, UK	
114	Win	81–27–6	Carmelo García	PTS	10	Feb 13, 1966	Estadio Insular, Las Palmas, Spain	
113	Win	80–27–6	Julian Gonzalez	PTS	8	Jan 27, 1966	Gran Price, Barcelona, Spain	
112	Win	79–27–6	Lelo Suarez	TKO	8 (10)	Dec 23, 1965	Gran Price, Barcelona, Spain	
111	Loss	78–27–6	Andrés Navarro	PTS	10	Dec 2, 1965	Gran Price, Barcelona, Spain	
110	Win	78–26–6	Vicente Ferrando	PTS	10	Nov 18, 1965	Gran Price, Barcelona, Spain	
109	Loss	77–26–6	Andrés Navarro	PTS	10	Nov 4, 1965	Gran Price, Barcelona, Spain	
108	Win	77–25–6	Jesse Williams	PTS	8	Sep 23, 1965	Plaza de Toros de Vista Alegre, Bilbao, Spain	
107	Win	76–25–6	Vicente Ferrando	PTS	8	Aug 28, 1965	Santander, Spain	
106	Win	75–25–6	Vicente Tomas Mokhtar	KO	5 (8)	Aug 1, 1965	Santander, Spain	
105	Win	74–25–6	Jesse Williams	PTS	8	May 15, 1965	Plaza de Toros de Vista Alegre, Bilbao, Spain	
104	Win	73–25–6	Andrés Navarro	PTS	10	Apr 4, 1965	Plaza de Toros de Vista Alegre, Bilbao, Spain	
103	Loss	72–25–6	Olli Mäki	SD	10	Feb 21, 1965	Hakametsan jaahalli, Tampere, Finland	
102	Win	72–24–6	Joe Tetteh	PTS	10	Jan 30, 1965	Stade de la Pépinière, Tunis, Tunisia	
101	Loss	71–24–6	Conny Rudhof	PTS	10	Jan 22, 1965	Festhalle, Frankfurt, Germany	
100	Win	71–23–6	Jose Maria Madrazo	PTS	10	Jan 2, 1965	Frontón del Club Deportivo, Bilbao, Spain	
99	Win	70–23–6	Waldo Dors	KO	3 (10)	Dec 5, 1964	Palais des Sports, Schaerbeek, Belgium	
98	Win	68–23–6	Tommy Tibbs	TKO	6 (10)	Oct 26, 1964	Palais des Sports, Paris, France	
97	Win	68–23–6	Rafiu King	PTS	10	Jun 5, 1964	Abidjan, Ivory Coast	
96	Draw	67–23–6	Francois Pavilla	PTS	10	May 11, 1964	Palais des Sports, Paris, France	
95	Win	67–23–5	Ray Adigun	RTD	5 (10)	Apr 13, 1964	Palais des Sports, Paris, France	
94	Loss	66–23–5	Ismael Laguna	PTS	10	Mar 9, 1964	Palais des Sports, Paris, France	
93	Win	66–22–5	Francesco Caruso	PTS	10	Feb 13, 1964	PalaLido, Milan, Italy	
92	Win	65–22–5	Giordano Campari	PTS	10	Jan 10, 1964	Milan, Italy	
91	Win	64–22–5	Sauveur Chiocca	PTS	10	Nov 15, 1963	Salle Wagram, Paris, France	
90	Win	63–22–5	Aissa Hashas	KO	7 (10)	Aug 2, 1963	Stade de la Pépinière, Tunis, Tunisia	
89	Draw	62–22–5	Claude Saluden	PTS	10	May 18, 1963	Patinoire des Vernets, Geneva, Switzerland	
88	Draw	62–22–4	Omrane Sadok	PTS	10	May 4, 1963	Tunis, Tunisia	
87	Loss	62–22–3	Eddie Perkins	PTS	10	Feb 25, 1963	Palais des Sports, Paris, France	
86	Win	62–21–3	Fernand Nollet	PTS	10	Jan 14, 1963	Palais des Sports, Paris, France	
85	Win	61–21–3	Ameur Lamine	PTS	10	Dec 29, 1962	Stade de la Pépinière, Tunis, Tunisia	
84	Loss	60–21–3	Jean Josselin	PTS	10	Dec 3, 1962	Palais des Sports, Paris, France	
83	Win	60–20–3	Juan Lopez Rodriguez	KO	8 (10)	Nov 10, 1962	Tours, France	
82	Win	59–20–3	Sauveur Chiocca	PTS	10	Oct 28, 1962	Palais de la Mutualité, Paris, France	
81	Draw	58–20–3	Omrane Sadok	PTS	10	Oct 15, 1962	Palais des Sports, Paris, France	
80	Win	58–20–2	Valerio Nunez	DQ	7 (10)	Sep 11, 1962	Palazzetto dello Sport, Rome, Italy	
79	Win	57–20–2	Mario Vecchiatto	PTS	10	Apr 27, 1962	Palazzetto dello Sport, Rome, Italy	
78	Win	56–20–2	Daniel Brunet	PTS	10	Apr 13, 1962	Cirque d'Hiver, Paris, France	
77	Win	55–20–2	Abderamane Faradji	KO	5 (10)	Mar 5, 1962	Palais des Sports, Paris, France	
76	Win	54–20–2	Manuel Sosa	KO	6 (10)	Feb 19, 1962	Palais des Sports, Paris, France	
75	Win	53–20–2	Mohammed Ben Said	KO	7 (10)	Feb 8, 1962	Salle Wagram, Paris, France	
74	Win	52–20–2	Robert DiMartino	PTS	10	Jan 19, 1962	Salle Wagram, Paris, France	
73	Win	51–20–2	Ameur Lamine	PTS	10	Dec 22, 1961	Salle Wagram, Paris, France	
72	Win	50–20–2	Rene Barriere	TKO	6 (10)	Dec 4, 1961	Palais des Sports, Paris, France	
71	Loss	49–20–2	Rafiu King	PTS	10	Nov 20, 1961	Palais des Sports, Paris, France	
70	Win	49–19–2	Jimmy Mackey	SD	10	Nov 1, 1961	Auditorium, Miami Beach, Florida, US	
69	Win	48–19–2	Hilton Smith	UD	10	Oct 4, 1961	Auditorium, Miami Beach, Florida, US	
68	Loss	47–19–2	Bunny Grant	UD	10	Aug 30, 1961	National Stadium, Kingston, Jamaica	
67	Win	47–18–2	Pastor Marrero	PTS	10	Jul 7, 1961	Palacio de Deportes, Havana, Cuba	
66	Loss	46–18–2	José Nápoles	PTS	10	Jun 3, 1961	Havana, Cuba	
65	Loss	46–17–2	Kid Anahuac	DQ	3 (10)	Apr 22, 1961	Monterrey, Mexico	
64	Loss	46–16–2	Alfredo Urbina	KO	9 (10)	Mar 25, 1961	Mexico City, Mexico	
63	Loss	46–15–2	Douglas Vaillant	SD	12	Feb 1, 1961	Havana, Cuba	For Cuba lightweight title
62	Loss	46–14–2	Carlos Hernandez	PTS	10	Oct 31, 1960	Caracas, Venezuela	
61	Loss	46–13–2	Carlos Hernandez	UD	10	Oct 18, 1960	Caracas, Venezuela	
60	Draw	46–12–2	Douglas Vaillant	PTS	10	Oct 1, 1960	Havana, Cuba	
59	Win	46–12–1	Guillermo Valdez	TKO	7 (10)	Sep 3, 1960	Coliseo Nacional, Havana, Cuba	
58	Win	45–12–1	Rolando Chico Morales	UD	10	Jul 23, 1960	Havana, Cuba	
57	Win	44–12–1	Eloy Henry	UD	10	Jul 3, 1960	Gimnasio Nacional, Panama City, Panama	
56	Loss	43–12–1	Jorge Quintero	PTS	10	Jun 12, 1960	Gimnasio Nacional, Panama City, Panama	
55	Loss	43–11–1	José Nápoles	PTS	10	May 21, 1960	Havana, Cuba	
54	Win	43–10–1	Isaac Espinosa	PTS	10	May 7, 1960	Havana, Cuba	
53	Win	42–10–1	Stanley Wilson	PTS	10	Apr 23, 1960	Havana, Cuba	
52	Loss	41–10–1	Jose Stable	UD	10	Mar 19, 1960	Havana, Cuba	
51	Win	41–9–1	Jose Stable	SD	10	Feb 13, 1960	Havana, Cuba	
50	Win	40–9–1	Jorge Quintero	UD	10	Dec 26, 1959	Palacio de Deportes, Havana, Cuba	
49	Win	39–9–1	Jiro Sawada	PTS	10	Dec 6, 1959	Maracaibo, Venezuela	
48	Loss	38–9–1	Cesar Orta	PTS	10	Nov 23, 1959	Caracas, Venezuela	
47	Loss	38–8–1	Vicente Rivas	PTS	10	Oct 12, 1959	Caracas, Venezuela	
46	Draw	38–7–1	Carlos Hernandez	PTS	10	Aug 15, 1959	Havana, Cuba	
45	Win	38–7	Tommy Tibbs	SD	10	Jul 11, 1959	Coliseo Nacional, Havana, Cuba	
44	Win	37–7	Jimmy Mackey	KO	5 (10), 2:08	Jun 20, 1959	Havana, Cuba	
43	Win	36–7	Alfredo Urbina	UD	10	May 16, 1959	Havana, Cuba	
42	Loss	35–7	Douglas Vaillant	UD	10	Mar 14, 1959	Havana, Cuba	
41	Win	35–6	Henry Ferguson	UD	10	Feb 16, 1959	Fort Homer Hesterly Armory, Tampa, Florida, US	
40	Loss	34–6	Frankie Ryff	UD	10	Jan 20, 1959	Auditorium, Miami Beach, Florida, US	
39	Win	34–5	Andy Arel	RTD	5 (10)	Dec 2, 1958	Auditorium, Miami Beach, Florida, US	
38	Loss	33–5	Rolando Chico Morales	PTS	12	Nov 15, 1958	Havana, Cuba	For vacant Cuban super featherweight title
37	Win	33–4	Pete Kawula	UD	10	Sep 6, 1958	Havana, Cuba	
36	Win	32–4	Bobby Bell	UD	10	Aug 5, 1958	Auditorium, Miami Beach, Florida, US	
35	Loss	31–4	Pupi Garcia	UD	10	Jun 28, 1958	Havana, Cuba	
34	Win	31–3	Julio Escobedo	KO	3 (10)	May 31, 1958	Havana, Cuba	
33	Win	30–3	Johnny Palmer	UD	10	Apr 12, 1958	Havana, Cuba	
32	Loss	29–3	Bobby Rogers	UD	10	Mar 11, 1958	Auditorium, Miami Beach, Florida, US	
31	Win	29–2	Isidro Martinez	TKO	9 (10), 2:05	Feb 26, 1958	Palacio de Deportes, Havana, Cuba	Won vacant Latin American super featherweight title
30	Win	28–2	Fernando Silva	TKO	6 (10)	Jan 11, 1958	Arena Trejo, Havana, Cuba	
29	Win	27–2	Guillermo Medina	PTS	10	Oct 5, 1957	Havana, Cuba	
28	Win	26–2	Rolando Chico Morales	PTS	10	Jul 27, 1957	Santiago de Cuba, Cuba	
27	Win	25–2	Orlando Echevarria	PTS	12	May 4, 1957	Palacio de Deportes, Havana, Cuba	
26	Win	24–2	Fernando Silva	PTS	10	Mar 16, 1957	Havana, Cuba	
25	Loss	23–2	Guillermo Medina	PTS	10	Feb 16, 1957	Palacio de Deportes, Havana, Cuba	
24	Win	23–1	Marino Gonzalez	KO	5 (?)	Dec 22, 1956	Havana, Cuba	
23	Win	22–1	Trini Ruiz	PTS	10	Dec 1, 1956	Havana, Cuba	
22	Win	21–1	Wilfredo Gonzalez	KO	4 (?)	Nov 22, 1956	Santiago de Cuba, Cuba	
21	Win	20–1	Juan 'Baby Face' Medina	PTS	8	Nov 3, 1956	Havana, Cuba	
20	Win	19–1	Alberto 'Taco' Robinson	PTS	8	Oct 13, 1956	Havana, Cuba	
19	Win	18–1	Salvador de la Torre	KO	6 (?)	Sep 22, 1956	Havana, Cuba	
18	Win	17–1	Isidro Chorin Zaldivar	PTS	8	Aug 31, 1956	Santa Clara, Cuba	
17	Win	16–1	Felix Alfredo Triana	PTS	8	Aug 18, 1956	Palacio de Deportes, Havana, Cuba	
16	Win	15–1	Rolando Garcia	PTS	6	Jul 14, 1956	Havana, Cuba	
15	Win	14–1	Libraldo Leyva	PTS	6	Jun 16, 1956	Havana, Cuba	
14	Win	13–1	Joel Morales	KO	3 (?)	May 19, 1956	Havana, Cuba	
13	Win	12–1	Enrique Fernandez	PTS	6	Apr 28, 1956	Havana, Cuba	
12	Win	11–1	Reinaldo Marquez	PTS	6	Apr 5, 1956	Arena, Santa Clara, Cuba	
11	Win	10–1	Gervasio Rodriguez	PTS	6	Mar 7, 1956	Palacio de Deportes, Havana, Cuba	
10	Win	9–1	Reinaldo Marquez	PTS	6	Feb 17, 1956	Santa Clara, Cuba	
9	Win	8–1	Inocencio Cartas	PTS	4	Feb 4, 1956	Havana, Cuba	
8	Win	7–1	Pedro Estrella	KO	2 (?)	Jan 21, 1956	Havana, Cuba	
7	Win	6–1	Reinaldo Marquez	PTS	4	Dec 17, 1955	Palacio de Deportes, Havana, Cuba	
6	Win	5–1	Jose Orta Pacheco	KO	2 (?)	Nov 19, 1955	Havana, Cuba	
5	Loss	4–1	Reinaldo Marquez	PTS	4	Oct 28, 1955	Santa Clara, Cuba	
4	Win	4–0	Odilio Velazquez	KO	3 (?)	Oct 15, 1955	Havana, Cuba	
3	Win	3–0	Reinaldo Suarez	KO	1 (?)	Sep 7, 1955	Palacio de Deportes, Havana, Cuba	
2	Win	2–0	Flavio Branco	KO	1 (?)	Aug 25, 1955	Santa Clara, Cuba	
1	Win	1–0	Roberto Garcia	KO	1 (?)	Jul 23, 1955	Havana, Cuba	

== See also ==
- List of Cubans
- Peter Buckley
- Buck Smith
- Gerald Hayes (boxer)
