= Carlos Morocho Hernández =

Venezuelan boxer (1940–2016)

Personal information
- Nickname: Morocho
- Born: Carlos Enrique Hernandez Ramos; 22 April 1940 Caracas, Venezuela
- Died: 2 July 2016 (aged 76)
- Height: 5 ft 10 in / 178cm
- Weight: Super lightweight

Boxing career
- Stance: orthodox

Boxing record
- Total fights: 76
- Wins: 60
- Win by KO: 44
- Losses: 12 (5 by KO)
- Draws: 4

Carlos Enrique Hernández Ramos (April 22, 1940 – July 2, 2016) was a Venezuelan world champion professional boxer. Known professionally as Carlos Morocho Hernandez (Carlos "Dark Haired" or, possibly, "Twin" Hernandez), he ended his career following a TKO by Scottish boxer Ken Buchanan.

== History ==
Carlos Enrique Hernandez Ramos was born on 22 April 1940, in the populous parish of La Pastora, Caracas. For the peculiarity of being dark-haired, was identified for most of his career as "Morocho", but also was known as "Kid Helicoide". His first triumphs in boxing came at the age of 15 years old, earning the titles of Champion of the Federal District and National Featherweight monarch. In his first international tournament, he was included in the Second World Amateur Boxing Championships held in Mexico, where he earned the "Ring of Diamonds".

He was also champion of Central America and the Caribbean and was undefeated after 25 amateur fights. Following his amateur career, which he finished undefeated, he tried his hand at professional boxing, which seemed a more lucrative field to him.

The "Morocho" made the leap to professional boxing under the tutelage of Juancho Medina. His debut was on 25 January 1959 at Nuevo Circo de Caracas, against Felix Gil, at featherweight. On 18 January 1965, Carlos "Morocho" Hernández won the world light-welterweight championship, facing the American Eddie Perkins and giving Venezuela its first world champion.

After a career of successes and excesses, Carlos "Morocho" Hernández, met the end and defeat when he faced, in London, on 11 May 1971 Scotsman Ken Buchanan, to whom Hernandez lost by TKO in the eighth round.

== Death ==
Carlos "Morocho" Hernandez" died in Caracas, Venezuela, on July 2, 2016, due to health complications.

== Professional boxing record ==
76 fights	60 wins	12 losses
By knockout	44	5
By decision	16	7
Draws	4	

No.	Result	Record	Opponent	Type	Round, time	Date	Location	Notes
76	Loss	60–12–4	Ken Buchanan	TKO	8 (10), 0:30	May 11, 1971	Empire Pool, Wembley, London, England, UK	
75	Loss	60–11–4	Gerardo Ferrat	PTS	10	Oct 2, 1970	Caracas, Venezuela	
74	Win	60–10–4	Jaguar Kakizawa	PTS	10	Jun 15, 1970	Caracas, Venezuela	
73	Win	59–10–4	Lloyd Marshall	TKO	4 (10)	Apr 17, 1970	Caracas, Venezuela	
72	Win	58–10–4	Raimundo Dias	TKO	9 (10)	Dec 19, 1969	Caracas, Venezuela	
71	Win	57–10–4	George Foster	KO	1 (10)	Dec 8, 1969	Caracas, Venezuela	
70	Win	56–10–4	Eugenio Espinoza	PTS	10	Oct 10, 1969	Caracas, Venezuela	
69	Win	55–10–4	Jose Luis Cruz	TKO	3 (10)	Jul 27, 1969	Caracas, Venezuela	
68	Win	54–10–4	Chucho Almazan	TKO	3 (10)	Jul 15, 1969	Maracaibo, Venezuela	
67	Loss	53–10–4	Nicolino Locche	UD	15	May 3, 1969	Estadio Luna Park, Buenos Aires, Argentina	For WBA and The Ring light welterweight titles
66	Win	53–9–4	Alfredo Urbina	TKO	2 (10)	Mar 31, 1969	Maracaibo, Venezuela	
65	Win	52–9–4	Grady Ponder	KO	2 (10)	Jan 27, 1969	Caracas, Venezuela	
64	Win	51–9–4	Ray Adigun	TKO	6 (10)	Dec 20, 1968	Nuevo Circo, Caracas, Venezuela	
63	Win	50–9–4	German Gastelbondo	KO	6 (10)	Nov 25, 1968	Nuevo Circo, Caracas, Venezuela	
62	Win	49–9–4	Herbie Lee	TKO	7 (10)	Oct 6, 1968	Nuevo Circo, Caracas, Venezuela	
61	Win	48–9–4	Agustin Chavez	KO	5 (10)	Aug 16, 1968	Caracas, Venezuela	
60	Win	47–9–4	Eduardo Moreno	TKO	5 (10)	Jul 5, 1968	Caracas, Venezuela	
59	Win	46–9–4	Johnny Brooks	PTS	10	Apr 1, 1968	Caracas, Venezuela	
58	Win	45–9–4	Curly Aguirre	KO	2 (10)	Feb 6, 1968	Caracas, Venezuela	
57	Loss	44–9–4	Curly Aguirre	KO	1 (10)	Nov 6, 1967	Nuevo Circo, Caracas, Venezuela	
56	Win	44–8–4	Curly Aguirre	KO	4 (10)	Sep 29, 1967	Caracas, Venezuela	
55	Draw	43–8–4	Alfredo Urbina	PTS	10	Sep 2, 1967	Nuevo Circo, Caracas, Venezuela	
54	Win	43–8–3	Daniel Guanin	KO	2 (10)	Jun 10, 1967	Caracas, Venezuela	
53	Win	42–8–3	Lennox Beckles	KO	4 (10)	Jan 20, 1967	San Cristobal, Venezuela	
52	Loss	41–8–3	Langston Morgan	KO	4 (10)	Dec 13, 1966	Maracaibo, Venezuela	
51	Win	41–7–3	Langston Morgan	TKO	2 (10)	Nov 22, 1966	Maracaibo, Venezuela	
50	Win	40–7–3	Kid Bassey II	TKO	3 (10)	Oct 1, 1966	Hiram Bithorn Stadium, San Juan, Puerto Rico	
49	Loss	39–7–3	Vicente Derado	UD	10	Jul 9, 1966	Hiram Bithorn Stadium, San Juan, Puerto Rico	
48	Loss	39–6–3	Sandro Lopopolo	MD	15	Apr 29, 1966	PalaEur, Roma, Italy	Lost WBA, WBC, and The Ring light welterweight titles
47	Loss	39–5–3	Ismael Laguna	TKO	8 (10), 0:30	Feb 19, 1966	Estadio Juan D. Arosemena, Panama City, Panama	
46	Win	39–4–3	Humberto Trottman	KO	2 (10)	Feb 5, 1966	Estadio Nacional, Panama City, Panama	
45	Win	38–4–3	Percy Hayles	KO	3 (15), 2:53	Jul 10, 1965	National Stadium, Kingston, Jamaica	Retained WBA, WBC, and The Ring light welterweight titles
44	Win	37–4–3	Mario Rossito	RTD	4 (15)	May 15, 1965	Estadio Alejandro Borges, Maracaibo, Venezuela	Retained WBA, WBC, and The Ring light welterweight titles
43	Win	36–4–3	Eddie Perkins	SD	15	Jan 18, 1965	Nuevo Circo, Caracas, Venezuela	Won WBA, WBC, and The Ring light welterweight titles
42	Win	35–4–3	Kenny Lane	TKO	2 (10)	Oct 5, 1964	Estadio Luis Aparicio, Maracaibo, Venezuela	
41	Loss	34–4–3	José Nápoles	TKO	7 (10)	Jun 22, 1964	Nuevo Circo, Caracas, Venezuela	
40	Win	34–3–3	Carlos Teo Cruz	TKO	2 (10)	Jun 1, 1964	Caracas, Venezuela	
39	Win	33–3–3	Joe Brown	KO	3 (10)	Nov 11, 1963	Maracaibo, Venezuela	
38	Win	32–3–3	Bunny Grant	RTD	2 (10)	May 27, 1963	Caracas, Venezuela	
37	Win	31–3–3	Rafael Luna	KO	3 (10)	Apr 13, 1963	San Cristobal, Venezuela	
36	Win	30–3–3	Isidro Rodriguez	KO	3 (10)	Jan 3, 1963	Ciudad Bolivar, Venezuela	
35	Win	29–3–3	Eloy Henry	KO	2 (10)	Dec 21, 1962	Nuevo Circo, Caracas, Venezuela	
34	Loss	28–3–3	Paul Armstead	UD	10	Nov 26, 1962	Nuevo Circo, Caracas, Venezuela	
33	Win	28–2–3	Douglas Vaillant	UD	10	Sep 17, 1962	Caracas, Venezuela	
32	Loss	27–2–3	Kenny Lane	UD	10	Jul 14, 1962	Madison Square Garden, New York City, New York, US	
31	Win	27–1–3	Paolo Rosi	TKO	1 (10), 2:11	Jun 16, 1962	Madison Square Garden, New York City, New York, US	
30	Win	26–1–3	Gene Gresham	PTS	10	May 21, 1962	Caracas, Venezuela	
29	Win	25–1–3	Douglas Vaillant	PTS	10	Mar 30, 1962	Caracas, Venezuela	
28	Win	24–1–3	Tito Marshall	KO	7 (10)	Feb 5, 1962	Caracas, Venezuela	
27	Win	23–1–3	Alfredo Urbina	UD	10	Dec 11, 1961	Arena, Philadelphia, Pennsylvania, US	
26	Win	22–1–3	Jethro Cason	UD	10	Nov 2, 1961	Alhambra Athletic Club, Philadelphia, Pennsylvania, US	
25	Win	21–1–3	Sebastiao Nascimento	KO	6 (10)	Aug 19, 1961	Estadio Universitario, Caracas, Venezuela	
24	Loss	20–1–3	Eddie Perkins	PTS	10	Jun 12, 1961	Caracas, Venezuela	
23	Win	20–0–3	Len Matthews	PTS	10	Mar 27, 1961	Caracas, Venezuela	
22	Draw	19–0–3	Kenny Lane	PTS	10	Feb 20, 1961	Caracas, Venezuela	
21	Win	19–0–2	Angel Robinson Garcia	PTS	10	Oct 31, 1960	Caracas, Venezuela	
20	Win	18–0–2	Angel Robinson Garcia	UD	10	Oct 18, 1960	Caracas, Venezuela	
19	Win	17–0–2	Boby Ros	TKO	6 (10)	Aug 31, 1960	Nuevo Circo, Caracas, Venezuela	
18	Win	16–0–2	Vicente Rivas	KO	1 (12), 2:19	Jul 5, 1960	Nuevo Circo, Caracas, Venezuela	Won vacant Venezuelan lightweight title
17	Win	15–0–2	Alfredo Urbina	UD	12	Apr 21, 1960	Olympic Auditorium, Los Angeles, California, US	
16	Win	14–0–2	Gil Cadilli	PTS	10	Apr 1, 1960	Caracas, Venezuela	
15	Win	13–0–2	Davey Moore	RTD	7 (10)	Mar 14, 1960	Nuevo Circo, Caracas, Venezuela	
14	Win	12–0–2	Baby Vasquez	KO	3 (10)	Jan 25, 1960	Caracas, Venezuela	
13	Win	11–0–2	Rocky Randell	KO	6 (10)	Dec 14, 1959	Caracas, Venezuela	
12	Draw	10–0–2	Douglas Vaillant	PTS	10	Nov 2, 1959	Caracas, Venezuela	
11	Win	10–0–1	Rodolfo Francis	UD	10	Aug 31, 1959	Nuevo Circo, Caracas, Venezuela	
10	Draw	9–0–1	Angel Robinson Garcia	PTS	10	Aug 15, 1959	Havana, Cuba	
9	Win	9–0	Luke Easter	PTS	8	Jun 19, 1959	Madison Square Garden, New York City, New York, US	
8	Win	8–0	Isidro Rodriguez	KO	7 (8)	Jun 6, 1959	Maracaibo, Venezuela	
7	Win	7–0	Pedro La Barrere	TKO	4 (8)	May 16, 1959	Havana, Cuba	
6	Win	6–0	Francisco Serrano	TKO	6 (8)	May 2, 1959	Havana, Cuba	
5	Win	5–0	Angel Chapman Martinez	KO	1 (8)	Apr 17, 1959	Santa Clara, Cuba	
4	Win	4–0	Isaac Espinosa	TKO	6 (6)	Apr 4, 1959	Havana, Cuba	
3	Win	3–0	Reinaldo Marquez	TKO	2 (6)	Mar 21, 1959	Havana, Cuba	
2	Win	2–0	Armando Castillo	TKO	2 (6)	Mar 7, 1959	Havana, Cuba	
1	Win	1–0	Felix Gil	TKO	3 (6)	Jan 26, 1959	Nuevo Circo, Caracas, Venezuela	

== Titles in boxing ==
=== Major world titles ===
- WBA light welterweight champion (140 lbs)
- WBC light welterweight champion (140 lbs)

=== The Ring magazine titles ===
- The Ring light welterweight champion (140 lbs)

=== Regional/International titles ===
- Venezuelan lightweight champion (135 lbs)

=== Undisputed titles ===
- Undisputed light welterweight champion

== See also ==
- List of world light-welterweight boxing champions

Sporting positions
World boxing titles
Preceded by Eddie Perkins	WBA light welterweight champion January 18, 1965 – April 29, 1966	Succeeded by Sandro Lopopolo
Preceded by Eddie Perkins	WBC light welterweight champion January 18, 1965 – April 29, 1966	Succeeded by Sandro Lopopolo
Preceded by Eddie Perkins	The Ring light welterweight champion January 18, 1965 – April 29, 1966	Succeeded by Sandro Lopopolo
Preceded by Eddie Perkins	Undisputed light welterweight champion January 18, 1965 – April 29, 1966	Succeeded by Sandro Lopopolo
