= Boxing at the 1960 Summer Olympics – Welterweight =

Olympic boxing tournament

Welterweight boxing at the Games of the XVII Olympiad
- Venue: Palazzo dello Sport
- Dates: 25 August – 5 September 1960
- Competitors: 33 from 33 nations

Medalists
1st place, gold medalist(s)		Giovanni Benvenuti	Italy
2nd place, silver medalist(s)		Yuri Radonyak	Soviet Union
3rd place, bronze medalist(s)		Leszek Drogosz	Poland
3rd place, bronze medalist(s)		Jimmy Lloyd	Great Britain

The men's welterweight event was part of the boxing programme at the 1960 Summer Olympics. The weight class allowed boxers of up to 67 kilograms to compete. The competition was held from 25 August to 5 September 1960. 33 boxers from 33 nations competed.

== Competition format ==
The competition was a single-elimination tournament, with no bronze medal match (two bronze medals were awarded, one to each semifinal loser).

== Results ==
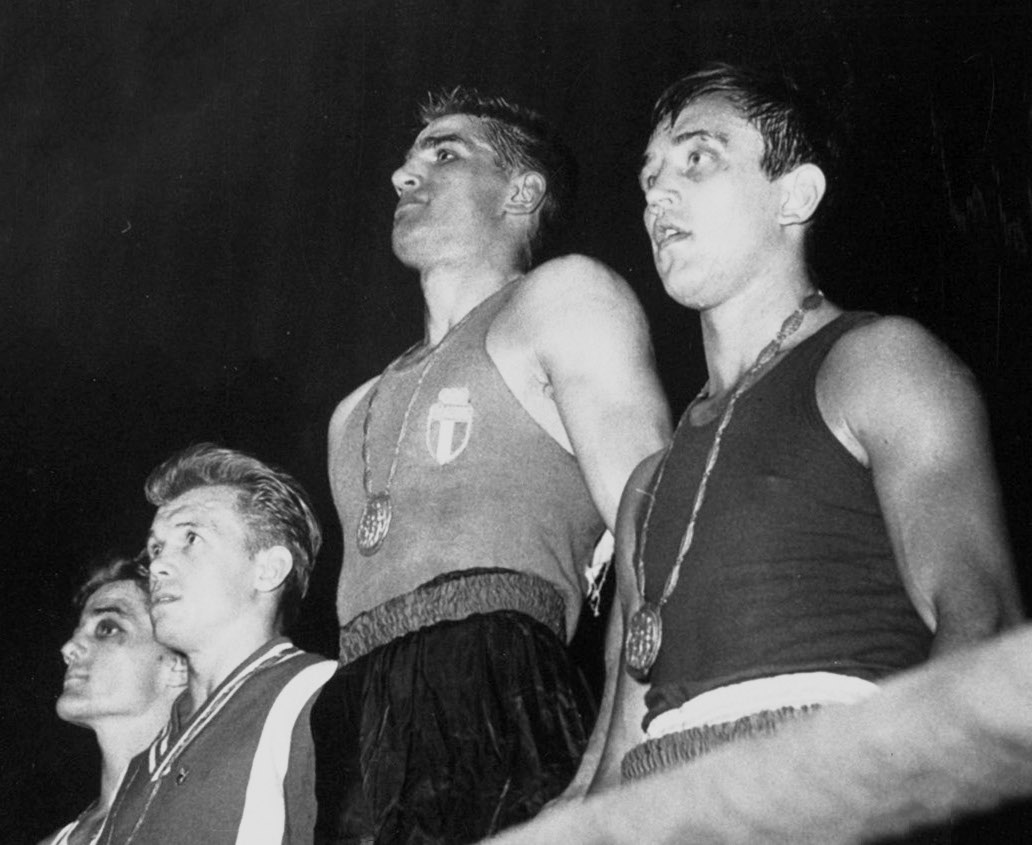
Left-right: Jimmy Lloyd, Leszek Drogosz, Giovanni Benvenuti, Yuri Radonyak

Results of the welterweight boxing competition.

=== Top half ===
Round of 32
Yuri Radonyak (URS)	3
Bruno Guse (EUA)	2
Karl Bergström (SWE)	0
Joseph Lartey (GHA)	5
Viljo Aho (FIN)	3
Mohamed Atmani (MAR)	2
Andrés Navarro (ESP)	5
Tongchai Teptani (THA)	0
Leszek Drogosz (POL)	5
Benny Nielsen (DEN)	0
Ghasem Yavarkandi (IRI)	3
Alfredo Cornejo (CHI)	2
Henry Loubscher (RSA)	5
László Sebők (HUN)	0
Des Duguid (AUS)	5
Dharmasiri Weerakoon (CEY)	0

Round of 16
Yuri Radonyak (URS)	KO-2
Joseph Lartey (GHA)	L
Viljo Aho (FIN)	0
Andrés Navarro (ESP)	5
Leszek Drogosz (POL)	5
Ghasem Yavarkandi (IRI)	0
Henry Loubscher (RSA)	5
Des Duguid (AUS)	0

Quarterfinals
Yuri Radonyak (URS)	4
Andrés Navarro (ESP)	1
Leszek Drogosz (POL)	5
Henry Loubscher (RSA)	0

Semifinals
Yuri Radonyak (URS)	3
Leszek Drogosz (POL)	2

=== Bottom half ===
Round of 64
Roberto Martínez (URU)	1
Max Meier (SUI)	4

Round of 32
Omrane Sadok (TUN)	KO-1
Tomislav Kelava (YUG)	L
Shishman Mitsev (BUL)	3
Aurelio González (ARG)	2
Harry Perry (IRL)	2
Kim Gi-su (KOR)	3
Jean Josselin (FRA)	0
Giovanni Benvenuti (ITA)	5
Jimmy Lloyd (GBR)	KO-2
Mohamed Faragalla (SUD)	L
Vasile Neagu (ROU)	5
Whitfield Moseley (NGR)	0
Phil Baldwin (USA)	KO-1
René Grün (LUX)	L
Franz Koschina (AUT)	L
Max Meier (SUI)	KO-2

Round of 16
Omrane Sadok (TUN)	2
Shishman Mitsev (BUL)	3
Kim Gi-su (KOR)	0
Giovanni Benvenuti (ITA)	5
Jimmy Lloyd (GBR)	KO-2
Vasile Neagu (ROU)	L
Phil Baldwin (USA)	5
Max Meier (SUI)	0

Quarter-finals
Shishman Mitsev (BUL)	0
Giovanni Benvenuti (ITA)	5
Jimmy Lloyd (GBR)	3
Phil Baldwin (USA)	2

Semi-finals
Giovanni Benvenuti (ITA)	5
Jimmy Lloyd (GBR)	0

=== Finals ===
Semifinals
Yuri Radonyak (URS)	3
Leszek Drogosz (POL)	2
Giovanni Benvenuti (ITA)	5
Jimmy Lloyd (GBR)	0

Final
Yuri Radonyak (URS)	1
Giovanni Benvenuti (ITA)	4
