= Eddie Perkins =

American boxer (1937–2012)

Personal information
- Born: March 3, 1937 Clarksdale, Mississippi, U.S.
- Died: May 10, 2012 (aged 75)
- Height: 5 ft 5 in (165 cm)
- Weight: Super lightweight

Boxing career
- Reach: 68 in (173 cm)
- Stance: Orthodox

Boxing record
- Total fights: 98
- Wins: 74
- Win by KO: 21
- Losses: 20
- Draws: 3
- No contests: 1

Eddie Perkins (March 3, 1937 – May 10, 2012) was an American light welterweight boxer. He compiled an amateur boxing record of 26–10.

== Professional career ==
Born in Clarksdale, Mississippi, Perkins turned professional in 1956. He was managed by Johnny Coulon and captured the Lineal and WBA light welterweight titles with a decision win over Duilio Loi in 1962, but lost the belt in a rematch later that year. In 1963 he then captured the Lineal, WBA and World Boxing Council light welterweight titles with a decision win over Roberto Cruz. He defended the belt twice before losing it to Carlos Morocho Hernández in 1965. He never challenged for a major title again, and retired in 1975. His record was 74–20–3 with 21 knockouts.

== Death ==
Perkins, who suffered from dementia and diabetes, died on May 10, 2012.

== Honors ==
Perkins was elected into the World Boxing Hall of Fame in 2006 and the International Boxing Hall of Fame in 2008.

== Professional boxing record ==
98 fights	74 wins	20 losses
By knockout	21	1
By decision	53	19
Draws	3	
No contests	1	

No.	Result	Record	Opponent	Type	Round, time	Date	Location	Notes
98	Loss	74–20–3 (1)	Franz Csandl	PTS	8	May 31, 1975	Cologne, Germany	
97	Loss	74–19–3 (1)	Shoji Tsujimoto	UD	10	Nov 11, 1974	Japan	
96	Loss	74–18–3 (1)	Maxwell Malinga	PTS	10	Oct 26, 1974	Rand Stadium, Johannesburg, South Africa	
95	Loss	74–17–3 (1)	Rocky Mattioli	UD	10	Aug 16, 1974	Festival Hall, Melbourne, Australia	
94	Win	74–16–3 (1)	Ryu Sorimachi	UD	10	May 13, 1974	Korakuen Hall, Japan	
93	Win	73–16–3 (1)	Angel Robinson Garcia	UD	10	Apr 27, 1974	Community Center, Tucson, Arizona, US	
92	Win	72–16–3 (1)	Armando Muñíz	UD	12	Mar 22, 1974	Community Center, Tucson, Arizona, US	Retained NABF welterweight title
91	Win	71–16–3 (1)	Eddie Blay	PTS	10	May 26, 1973	Wiener Stadthalle, Vienna, Austria	
90	Win	70–16–3 (1)	Johnny Rico	UD	10	Apr 21, 1973	Community Center, Tucson, Arizona, US	
89	Win	69–16–3 (1)	Aristeo Castro	KO	2 (10)	Mar 24, 1973	Community Center, Tucson, Arizona, US	
88	Win	68–16–3 (1)	Armando Muñíz	SD	12	Jan 30, 1973	Auditorium Arena, Denver, Colorado, US	Won NABF welterweight title
87	Win	67–16–3 (1)	Nelson Ruiz	KO	10 (?)	Dec 15, 1972	Domo Bolivariano, Barquisimeto, Venezuela	
86	Loss	66–16–3 (1)	Victor Ortiz	PTS	10	Jul 8, 1972	Ponce, Puerto Rico	
85	Win	66–15–3 (1)	Frankie Lewis	UD	10	May 13, 1972	International Amphitheatre, Chicago, Illinois, US	
84	Win	65–15–3 (1)	Jesse Avalos	UD	10	Apr 17, 1972	Mill Run Theater, Niles, Illinois, US	
83	Win	64–15–3 (1)	Frank Flores	UD	10	Apr 8, 1972	Community Center, Tucson, Arizona, US	
82	Win	63–15–3 (1)	Ángel Espada	UD	10	Oct 19, 1971	Hiram Bithorn Stadium, San Juan, Puerto Rico	
81	Win	62–15–3 (1)	Dorman Crawford	TKO	10 (12)	Mar 9, 1971	Gimnasio Nacional Eddy Cortés, San Jose, Costa Rica	
80	Win	61–15–3 (1)	Domingo Rubio	TKO	6 (10)	Dec 18, 1970	Teatro Circo Caupolicán, Santiago de Chile, Chile	
79	Win	60–15–3 (1)	Don Davis	PTS	10	Nov 20, 1970	Wiener Stadthalle, Vienna, Austria	
78	NC	59–15–3 (1)	Raul Rodriguez	NC	5 (10)	Sep 19, 1970	Coliseum, Chicago, Illinois, US	
77	Win	59–15–3	Johann Orsolics	KO	4 (10)	Sep 3, 1970	Stadthalle, Vienna, Austria	
76	Win	58–15–3	Hidemori Tsujimoto	RTD	8 (10)	Aug 8, 1970	Japan	
75	Loss	57–15–3	Bunny Grant	MD	10	Jul 25, 1970	National Arena, Kingston, Jamaica	
74	Win	57–14–3	Pedro Adigue Jr.	TKO	5 (10)	Jul 21, 1970	Honolulu International Center, Honolulu, Hawaii, US	
73	Win	56–14–3	Clyde Gray	UD	10	Apr 27, 1970	Aragon Ballroom, Chicago, Illinois, US	
72	Win	55–14–3	Lion Furuyama	PTS	10	Mar 25, 1970	Korakuen Hall, Japan	
71	Win	54–14–3	Dino Del Cid	PTS	10	Feb 16, 1970	Aragon Ballroom, Chicago, Illinois, US	
70	Loss	53–14–3	Joao Henrique	UD	10	Jul 11, 1969	Ginásio Estadual do Ibirapuera, Sao Paulo, Brazil	
69	Win	53–13–3	Maurice Cullen	UD	8	Jun 5, 1969	K.B. Hallen, Copenhagen, Denmark	
68	Win	52–13–3	Joseph Sishi	PTS	10	Mar 29, 1969	Curries Fountain, Durban, South Africa	
67	Win	51–13–3	Richard Kid Borias	PTS	10	Mar 15, 1969	Curries Fountain, Durban, South Africa	
66	Win	50–13–3	Børge Krogh	PTS	10	Jan 2, 1969	K.B. Hallen, Copenhagen, Denmark	
65	Win	49–13–3	Mackeed Mofokeng	PTS	10	Oct 19, 1968	Orlando Stadium, Johannesburg, South Africa	
64	Win	48–13–3	Fernand Simard	KO	6 (10)	Sep 30, 1968	The Tower, Quebec City, Quebec, Canada	
63	Draw	47–13–3	Joao Henrique	PTS	10	Dec 19, 1967	Ginásio Estadual do Ibirapuera, Sao Paulo, Brazil	
62	Win	47–13–2	Angel Robinson Garcia	PTS	10	Dec 5, 1967	Milan, Italy	
61	Win	46–13–2	Adolph Pruitt	UD	10	Oct 2, 1967	Silver Slipper, Las Vegas, Nevada, US	
60	Loss	45–13–2	Nicolino Locche	PTS	10	Aug 19, 1967	Estadio Luna Park, Buenos Aires, Argentina	
59	Win	45–12–2	Paul Armstead	UD	10	May 29, 1967	Silver Slipper, Las Vegas, Nevada, US	
58	Win	44–12–2	Adolph Pruitt	MD	10	Apr 3, 1967	Silver Slipper, Las Vegas, Nevada, US	
57	Win	43–12–2	Joe N'Gidi	PTS	10	Mar 4, 1967	Orlando Stadium, Johannesburg, South Africa	
56	Win	42–12–2	Vic Andreetti	TKO	8 (10), 0:58	Feb 14, 1967	Royal Albert Hall, Kensington, London, England	
55	Draw	41–12–2	Eugenio Espinoza	PTS	10	Sep 25, 1966	Quito, Ecuador	
54	Loss	41–12–1	Lennox Beckles	UD	10	Jul 31, 1966	Georgetown, Guyana	
53	Win	41–11–1	Mel Ferguson	TKO	8 (10), 3:00	May 2, 1966	Hacienda Hotel, Las Vegas, Nevada, US	
52	Win	40–11–1	Kenny Lane	UD	12	Oct 25, 1965	Municipal Auditorium, New Orleans, Louisiana, US	
51	Loss	39–11–1	José Nápoles	UD	10	Aug 3, 1965	Plaza de Toros, Ciudad Juarez, Mexico	
50	Win	39–10–1	Johnny DePeiza	PTS	10	May 28, 1965	Port-of-Spain, Trinidad & Tobago	
49	Loss	38–10–1	Carlos Hernández	SD	15	Jan 18, 1965	Nuevo Circo, Caracas, Venezuela	Lost WBA, WBC, and The Ring light welterweight titles
48	Win	38–9–1	Mario Rossito	UD	10	Sep 18, 1964	Plaza de Toros Santamaria, Bogota, Colombia	
47	Win	37–9–1	Mauro Vazquez	TKO	8 (10)	Sep 5, 1964	Plaza de Toros Monumental, Monterrey, Mexico	
46	Win	36–9–1	Les Sprague	UD	10	Jun 24, 1964	Exhibition Stadium, Regina, Saskatchewan, Canada	
45	Win	35–9–1	Bunny Grant	UD	15	Apr 18, 1964	National Stadium, Kingston, Jamaica	Retained WBA, WBC, and The Ring light welterweight titles
44	Win	34–9–1	Yoshinori Takahashi	KO	13 (15), 1:35	Jan 4, 1964	Kokugikan, Japan	Retained WBA, WBC, and The Ring light welterweight titles
43	Win	33–9–1	Joey Limas	TKO	10 (10), 1:07	Oct 1, 1963	Civic Auditorium, Albuquerque, New Mexico, US	
42	Win	32–9–1	Bobby Scanlon	UD	10	Aug 27, 1963	Memorial Auditorium, Sacramento, California, US	
41	Win	31–9–1	Roberto Cruz	UD	15	Jun 15, 1963	Rizal Memorial Sports Complex, Manila, Philippines	Won WBA light welterweight title; Won inaugural WBC and vacant The Ring light welterweight titles
40	Win	30–9–1	Angel Robinson Garcia	PTS	10	Feb 25, 1963	Palais des Sports, Paris, France	
39	Win	29–9–1	Omrane Sadok	KO	6 (10)	Jan 14, 1963	Palais des Sports, Paris, France	
38	Loss	28–9–1	Duilio Loi	PTS	15	Dec 15, 1962	Palazzo dello Sport (Pad. 3 Fiera), Milan, Italy	Lost WBA and NYSAC light welterweight titles; For vacant The Ring light welterweight title
37	Win	28–8–1	Duilio Loi	UD	15	Sep 14, 1962	Velodromo Vigorelli, Milan, Italy	Won WBA and NYSAC light welterweight titles
36	Win	27–8–1	Dick Gilford	PTS	10	Jun 6, 1962	Coliseum, Fort Wayne, Indiana, US	
35	Win	26–8–1	Mel Middleton	TKO	8 (10)	Mar 26, 1962	Arena, Philadelphia, Pennsylvania, US	
34	Draw	25–8–1	Duilio Loi	SD	15	Oct 21, 1961	Palazzo dello Sport (Pad. 3 Fiera), Milan, Italy	For NBA and NYSAC light welterweight titles
33	Win	25–8	Mauro Vazquez	UD	10	Jul 10, 1961	Tijuana, Mexico	
32	Win	24–8	Carlos Hernández	PTS	10	Jun 12, 1961	Caracas, Venezuela	
31	Win	23–8	Baby Vasquez	SD	10	May 6, 1961	Monterrey, Mexico	
30	Win	22–8	Chuck Taylor	UD	10	Feb 27, 1961	Marigold Gardens, Chicago, Illinois, US	
29	Loss	21–8	LC Morgan	UD	10	Jan 12, 1961	Olympic Auditorium, Los Angeles, California, US	
28	Win	21–7	Chico Santos	UD	10	Nov 18, 1960	Memorial Auditorium, Sacramento, California, US	
27	Win	20–7	Gene Gresham	UD	10	Sep 28, 1960	Chicago Stadium, Chicago, Illinois, US	
26	Win	19–7	Joey Lopes	TKO	7 (10), 0:40	Aug 10, 1960	Chicago Stadium, Chicago, Illinois, US	
25	Win	18–7	Chico Rollins	UD	10	May 18, 1960	Chicago Stadium, Chicago, Illinois, US	
24	Win	17–7	Chico Rollins	TKO	6 (10)	Mar 30, 1960	Chicago Stadium, Chicago, Illinois, US	
23	Win	16–7	Larry Boardman	UD	10	Jan 12, 1960	Auditorium, Miami Beach, Florida, US	
22	Loss	15–7	Alfredo Urbina	RTD	6 (10)	Nov 28, 1959	Arena Mexico, Mexico City, Mexico	
21	Loss	15–6	Carl Hubbard	UD	10	Sep 24, 1959	Alhambra A.C., Philadelphia, Pennsylvania, US	
20	Win	15–5	Hilario Morales	SD	10	Jun 4, 1959	Olympic Auditorium, Los Angeles, California, US	
19	Win	14–5	Paul Armstead	SD	10	Apr 8, 1959	Chicago Stadium, Chicago, Illinois, US	
18	Loss	13–5	Lahouari Godih	SD	10	Jan 21, 1959	Capitol Arena, Washington, D.C., US	
17	Win	13–4	Baby Vasquez	TKO	7 (10), 2:40	Dec 17, 1958	Capitol Arena, Washington, D.C., US	
16	Win	12–4	Frankie Ryff	UD	10	Nov 12, 1958	Chicago Stadium, Chicago, Illinois, US	
15	Win	11–4	Cecil Shorts	TKO	2 (8)	Sep 24, 1958	Chicago Stadium, Chicago, Illinois, US	
14	Win	10–4	Candy McFarland	SD	8	Jun 25, 1958	Chicago Stadium, Chicago, Illinois, US	
13	Loss	9–4	Cecil Shorts	UD	8	May 14, 1958	Chicago Stadium, Chicago, Illinois, US	
12	Win	9–3	Joey Parks	UD	6	Apr 16, 1958	Chicago Stadium, Chicago, Illinois, US	
11	Win	8–3	Willie Dillon	TKO	5 (8)	Mar 4, 1958	Joe Louis Gymnasium, Chicago, Illinois, US	
10	Win	7–3	Alan Kennedy	UD	6	Jan 29, 1958	Chicago Stadium, Chicago, Illinois, US	
9	Win	6–3	Chuck Adkins	TKO	1 (8)	Jan 14, 1958	Joe Louis Gymnasium, Chicago, Illinois, US	
8	Win	5–3	Don Ward	UD	6	Dec 18, 1957	Chicago Stadium, Chicago, Illinois, US	
7	Win	4–3	Carlo Sarlo	UD	6	Oct 30, 1957	Chicago Stadium, Chicago, Illinois, US	
6	Win	3–3	Jimmy McCoy	UD	6	Sep 11, 1957	Chicago Stadium, Chicago, Illinois, US	
5	Loss	2–3	Solomon Boysaw	PTS	6	Aug 9, 1957	Public Hall, Cleveland, Ohio, US	
4	Win	2–2	Billy Williams	PTS	4	May 3, 1957	Freedom Hall, Louisville, Kentucky, US	
3	Win	1–2	Jerry Jordan	SD	4	Apr 17, 1957	Chicago Stadium, Chicago, Illinois, US	
2	Loss	0–2	Jerry Jordan	SD	6	Jan 23, 1957	Chicago Stadium, Chicago, Illinois, US	
1	Loss	0–1	Norman Johnson	UD	6	Dec 27, 1956	Arena, Milwaukee, Wisconsin, US	

== Titles in boxing ==
=== Major world titles ===
- NYSAC light welterweight champion (140 lbs)
- WBA light welterweight champion (140 lbs) (2×)
- WBC light welterweight champion (Note: Inaugural champion.) (140 lbs)

=== The Ring magazine titles ===
- The Ring light welterweight champion (140 lbs)

=== Regional/International titles ===
- NABF welterweight champion (147 lbs)

=== Undisputed titles ===
- Undisputed light welterweight champion (Note: First undisputed reign was in the NYSAC–NBA era. Second undisputed reign was in the WBC-WBA era.) (2×)

== See also ==
- List of world light-welterweight boxing champions

== Notes and references ==
=== References ===
Sporting positions
Regional boxing titles
Preceded by Armando Muñíz	NABF welterweight champion January 30, 1973 – 1975; Vacated	Vacant Title next held by Pete Ranzany
World boxing titles
Preceded by Duilio Loi	WBA light welterweight champion September 14, 1962 – December 15, 1962	Succeeded by Duilio Loi
Preceded by Roberto Cruz	WBA light welterweight champion June 15, 1963 – January 18, 1965	Succeeded by Carlos Morocho Hernández
Inaugural champion	WBC light welterweight champion June 15, 1963 – January 18, 1965	Succeeded by Carlos Morocho Hernández
Vacant Title last held by Duilio Loi	The Ring light welterweight champion June 15, 1963 – January 18, 1965	Succeeded by Carlos Morocho Hernández
Vacant Title last held by Duilio Loi	Undisputed light welterweight champion June 15, 1963 – January 18, 1965	Succeeded by Carlos Morocho Hernández
