= Dharmasiri Weerakoon =

Sri Lankan boxer

Personal information
- Nationality: Sri Lankan
- Born: 28 September 1938 Colombo, Ceylon
- Died: 30 September 2008 (aged 70) Beruwala, Sri Lanka

Sport
- Sport: Boxing

Dharmasiri Weerakoon (28 September 1938 – 30 September 2008) was a Sri Lankan boxer. He held the National Champion title in Sri Lanka from 1956 to 1959. He was also the Asian champion in his weight category and represented Sri Lanka (Ceylon) in the 1960 Rome Summer Olympics. He competed in the men's welterweight event at the 1960 Summer Olympics. At the 1960 Summer Olympics, he lost on points to Des Duguid of Australia.
