= Joseph Lartey =

Ghanaian boxer

Personal information
- Nationality: Ghanaian
- Born: 14 July 1938 (age 86); Accra, Ghana

Sport
- Sport: Boxing

Joseph Lartey (born 14 July 1938) is a Ghanaian boxer. He competed in the men's welterweight event at the 1960 Summer Olympics. At the 1960 Summer Olympics, he defeated Karl Bergström of Sweden by decision in the Round of 32, before losing to Yuri Radonyak of the Soviet Union by knockout in the Round of 16.
