= Raymundo Torres (boxer) =

Mexican boxer

Raymundo "Battling" Torres (17 February 1941 – 11 November 1972) was a Mexican junior lightweight who fought from 1957 to 1967. Torres was a puncher, but proved to have difficulty taking punches himself. Thus, he was knocked out in many of his more important bouts, including his two attempts to capture a world title. He was known as El Nino Asesino

Torres was born in Cerritos, San Luis Potosí, but was also known as the "Reynosa Rattlesnake" because he was raised in the bordertown of Reynosa, Tamaulipas. He first challenged for the world junior welterweight title when he faced champion Carlos Ortiz in February 1960. Ortiz prevailed in the hard fought contest when he scored a knock out in the tenth round. Prior to that loss, Torres had been undefeated in 31 contests.

Torres' next crack at the title came when he challenged for the vacated WBA light welterweight crown in 1963. Although favored to win, he was knocked out in the first round by Roberto Cruz of the Philippines. Cruz lost the title a mere three months later when he was defeated by Eddie Perkins and never contended for the title again.

Torres retired with a record of 59 wins (49 by KO) and 9 losses. He was selected for the Ring Magazine's list of 100 greatest punchers of all time.
