= Roberto Martínez (Uruguayan boxer) =

Uruguayan boxer

Personal information
- Born: 10 July 1938 (age 86); Castillos, Uruguay

Sport
- Sport: Boxing

Roberto Martínez (born 10 July 1938) is a Uruguayan boxer. He competed in the men's welterweight event at the 1960 Summer Olympics. At the 1960 Summer Olympics, he lost to Max Meier of Switzerland.
