= Roberto Cruz =

Roberto Cruz may refer to:

- Roberto Cruz (boxer) (born 1941), Filipino boxer
- Roberto Cruz (taekwondo) (born 1972), Filipino taekwondo practitioner
