= Jimmy Lloyd (boxer) =

English boxer (1939-2013)

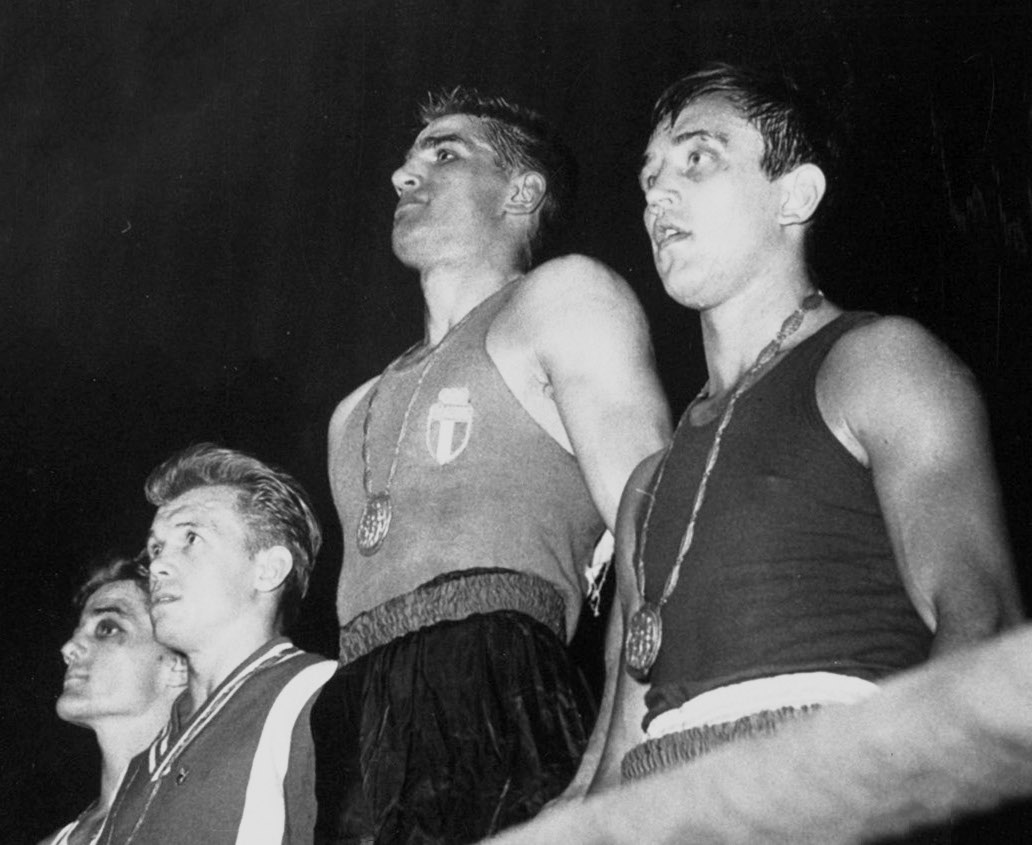
- Lloyd (left) at the 1960 Olympics

Personal information
- Born: 5 July 1939 Liverpool, England
- Died: 22 March 2013 (aged 73) Skelmersdale, Lancashire, England
- Height: 173 cm (5 ft 8 in)

Sport
- Sport: Boxing
- Club: Army Boxing Association
Medal record
Representing Great Britain
Olympic Games
Bronze medal – third place	1960 Rome	Welterweight

James Lloyd (5 July 1939 – 22 March 2013) was an English boxer. He won a bronze medal in the welterweight division at the 1960 Olympics, losing in the semifinals to the eventual winner Nino Benvenuti. He fought under the names Jim Lloyd and Jimmy Lloyd.

== Biography ==
Lloyd won the 1962 Amateur Boxing Association British light-middleweight title, when boxing for the army. After winning the light middleweight title he turned professional and retired in 1966 with a record of 10 wins, 7 losses and 3 draws.

Lloyd took up boxing aged 9, following his two elder brothers into the sport. In the early 1960s he served and boxed for the British Army and later worked as a mechanic, welder, lorry driver and security guard. In the late 1960's, he co-founded Skelmersdale Amateur Boxing Club with his older brother, Alan Lloyd and for 35 years trained young boxers there. He died of a heart attack, aged 73, and is survived by four children.
