= Roberto Durán vs. Pipino Cuevas =

Boxing match

The Return of the Champions
- Date: January 29, 1983
- Venue: Los Angeles Memorial Sports Arena, Los Angeles, California

Tale of the tape
Boxer	Roberto Durán	Pipino Cuevas
Nickname	Manos de Piedra ("Hands of Stone")	
Hometown	Panama City, Panama Province, Panama	Santo Tomás, Edomex, Mexico
Purse	$50,000	$50,000
Pre-fight record	75–4 (56 KO)	29–8 (26 KO)
Age	31 years, 7 months	25 years, 1 month
Height	5 ft 7 1/2 in (171 cm)	5 ft 8 in (173 cm)
Weight	152 lb (69 kg)	149 lb (68 kg)
Style	Orthodox	Orthodox
Recognition	WBA; No. 10 Ranked Light Middleweight; 2–division world champion	WBA; No. 9 Ranked Welterweight; The Ring; No. 5 Ranked Welterweight; Former welterweight champion

Result
- Durán wins via 4th round TKO

Roberto Durán vs. Pipino Cuevas, billed as The Return of the Champions, was a professional boxing match contested on January 29, 1983.

== Background ==
In December 1982, a fight between former world champions Roberto Durán and José "Pipino" Cuevas was made official. The bout was to take place on January 29, 1983, at the Los Angeles Memorial Sports Arena on the eve of Super Bowl XVII, which was being played in nearby Pasadena. The fighters agreed to a catch weight of 150 pounds, between the welterweight limit of 147, where Cuevas had spent his entire career, and the super welterweight limit of 154 where Durán was now fighting, though Durán came into the fight 2 pounds over.

Both fighters were hoping that a victory could launch a comeback as both of their careers had suffered recent setbacks. Cuevas had been inactive for a year after unanimous decision loss to little-known Roger Stafford in what was The Ring magazine's upset of the year for 1981. Meanwhile, Durán had suffered a split decision loss to fringe contender Kirkland Laing only four months prior, this was The Ring magazine's upset of the year for 1982. The two men had fought in the welterweight division for a number of years and both had held a version of the welterweight world title, but a fight between the two was never made. Said Cuevas, "I've been waiting about three or four years to fight Duran. I still consider him a tough competitor and I think it will be a great fight." Durán mimicked Cuevas' sentiments stating "I've wanted to fight Cuevas ever since I became a welterweight but it was the circumstances the promoters were in that made it impossible for me to fight him. I feel I am well-prepared. I intend to win."

Durán had a lot riding on the fight as a victory over Cuevas all but guaranteed him a title shot against WBA super welterweight champion Davey Moore. Moore had originally been scheduled defend his title against the undefeated up-and-coming prospect Tony Ayala Jr., but the match was scrapped after Ayala was arrested and charged with the burglary and rape of a young woman who had been his neighbor. With Moore suddenly in need of an opponent, Durán stated that promoter Bob Arum had "promised him" the fight. Arum would confirm the promise following Durán's victory over Cuevas.

== The fight ==
Durán controlled the duration of the fight by keeping a rusty Cuevas off balance with jabs in the first two rounds, then hammering him with combinations in the third and fourth rounds. In the fourth round, a Durán combination sent Cuevas into the corner though the turnbuckle saved him from hitting the canvas, the referee nevertheless counted it as a knockdown and after answering the 8-count, the fight continued with Durán immediately unleashed a series of combinations that sent Cuevas down again. A clearly hurt Cuevas struggled to get back to his feet, but his manager Lupe Sanchez entered the ring to signify surrender and prevent any further punishment, giving Durán the victory by technical knockout.

== Aftermath ==
After the fight, Moore wondered, "Was that Duran looking so good or Cuevas so bad?".

== Fight card ==
Confirmed bouts:

Weight Class	Weight		vs.		Method	Round	Notes
Catchweight	151 lbs.	Roberto Durán	def.	Pipino Cuevas	TKO	4/12
Super Lightweight	140 lbs.	Sergio Medina	def.	Alfredo Escalera	UD	10/10
Bantamweight	118 lbs.	Daniel Zaragoza	def.	Lorenzo Ramirez	PTS	10/10

== Broadcasting ==
Country	Broadcaster
Australia	Seven Network
Canada	Superchannel
Mexico	Televisa
Philippines	MBS 4
Puerto Rico	WAPA-TV
United Kingdom	ITV
United States	NBC

Preceded by vs. Jimmy Batten	Roberto Durán's bouts 29 January 1983	Succeeded by vs. Davey Moore
Preceded by vs. Roger Stafford	Pipino Cuevas's bouts 29 January 1983	Succeeded by vs. Mauricio Bravo
