= Vasile Neagu =

Romanian boxer

Personal information
- Nationality: Romanian
- Born: 9 September 1940 (age 85) Hârșova, Romania

Sport
- Sport: Boxing

Vasile Neagu (born 9 September 1940) is a Romanian boxer. He competed in the men's welterweight event at the 1960 Summer Olympics.
