= Phil Baldwin =

American boxer (1942–2017)

Personal information
- Nationality: American
- Born: April 4, 1942 Montgomery, Alabama, United States
- Died: November 19, 2017 (aged 75) Muskegon Heights, Michigan, United States

Sport
- Sport: Boxing

Arthur Phillip Baldwin, known as Phil Baldwin (April 4, 1942 – November 19, 2017) was an American boxer. He competed in the men's welterweight event at the 1960 Summer Olympics. He died on November 19, 2017, at the age of 75.
