= Whitfield Moseley =

Nigerian boxer

Olufemi Moseley
Personal information
- Nickname: Whitfield Moseley
- Nationality: Nigerian
- Born: Olufemi Moseley; 6 April 1940 (age 85) Freetown, Sierra Leone

Sport
- Sport: Boxing

Olufemi Moseley (born 6 April 1940) is a Nigerian boxer. He competed in the men's welterweight event at the 1960 Summer Olympics.
