= Viljo Aho =

Finnish boxer

Personal information
- Nationality: Finnish
- Born: 2 November 1932; Kanneljärvi, Finland (now Russia)
- Died: 23 February 2013 (aged 80); Sysmä, Finland

Sport
- Sport: Boxing

Viljo Aho (2 November 1932 – 23 February 2013) was a Finnish boxer. He competed in the men's welterweight event at the 1960 Summer Olympics.
