= Pipino Cuevas =

Mexican world champion boxer (b. 1957)

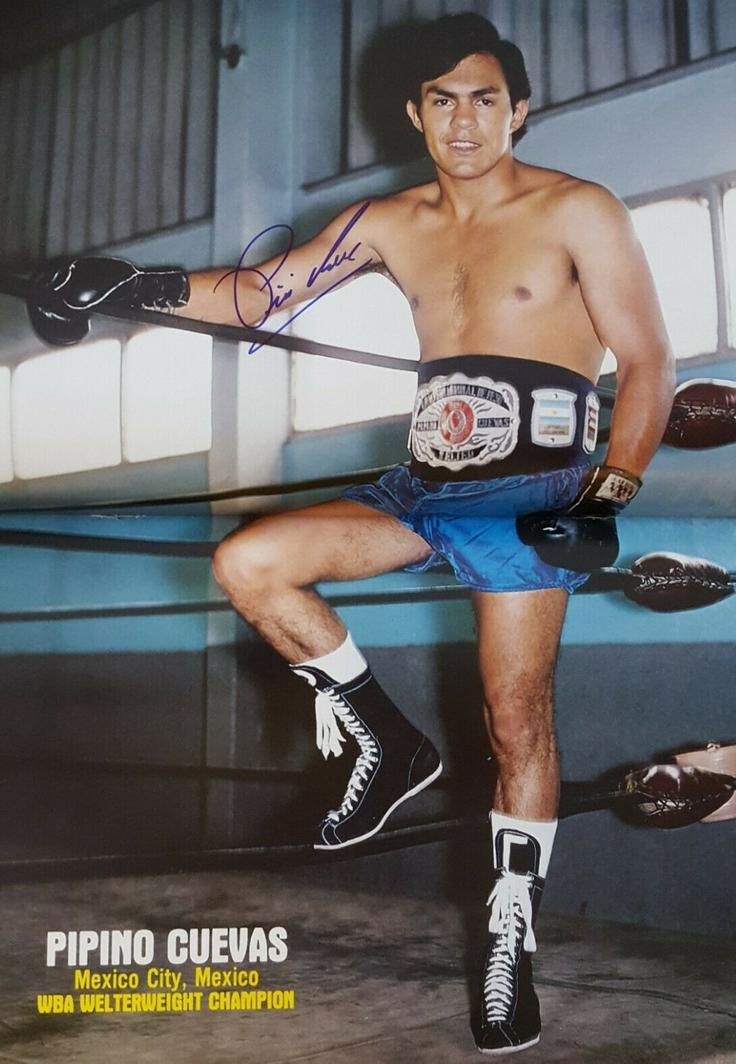
- Cuevas c. 1980

Personal information
- Born: José Isidro Cuevas González; 27 December 1957 (age 68) Santo Tomás, Hidalgo, Mexico
- Height: 5 ft 8 in (173 cm)
- Weight: Welterweight

Boxing career
- Stance: Orthodox

Boxing record
- Total fights: 50
- Wins: 35
- Win by KO: 31
- Losses: 15

José Isidro Cuevas González (born December 27, 1957), known as Pipino Cuevas, is a Mexican former professional boxer who competed from 1971 to 1989. He held the WBA welterweight title from 1976 to 1980.

Cuevas was inducted into both the International Boxing Hall of Fame, and the World Boxing Hall of Fame.

== Professional career ==
Cuevas turned professional at age 14; he won only seven of his first twelve bouts but eventually put together an eight bout winning streak before losing to Andy Price. On 17 July 1976, he received a shot at the WBA welterweight title against champion Ángel Espada. Cuevas pulled off an upset victory by knocking Espada to the canvas three times in the second round. At age 18, he was the youngest welterweight champion in history. In his first defense, he traveled to Japan and defeated hometown fighter Shoji Tsujimoto by knockout.

One of the greatest wins of his career was against Argentinian Miguel Angel Campanino, who boasted an impressive record (84-4-4), including a thirty-two fight winning streak. Once again, Pipino disposed of his challenger before the end of the second round.

On 8 June 1977, he faced veteran Clyde Gray of Canada who had only been stopped twice in his entire career which included fifty-eight wins. Yet again, Cuevas pulled off another second round knock out. A few months later, Cuevas returned to the ring for a rematch against Espada. This time Cuevas defeated Espada in the eleventh round after he sustained a broken jaw. On 4 March 1978, he disposed of Harold Weston in the ninth round after Weston also sustained a broken jaw like Cuevas' previous challenger. Cuevas then defeated former champion Billy Backus in one round. On 9 September 1978, he defeated hometown favorite Pete Ranzany (40-2-1) in Sacramento, California via a second-round knockout. He defeated Scott Clark (28-1-0) in another second-round knockout. Cuevas next title defense went the distance in a unanimous decision win against the durable Randy Shields (33-5-1). On 8 December 1979, he faced Espada for a third time, stopping him in the tenth round. Cuevas then defeated South African national champion Harold Volbrecht by fifth-round knockout.

Cuevas finally lost his title in 1980 to the undefeated and up-and-coming hometown hero Thomas Hearns in Detroit. The much taller and lankier Hearns was able to use his reach to his advantage as he kept Cuevas at a distance and knocked him out in the second round. Cuevas' talent began to decline after that loss; the most notable opponent he faced was Roberto Durán, who stopped him in the fourth round in the spring of 1983. He also lost to former world title challenger Jun Sok-Hwang and future or former world champions Jorge Vaca and Lupe Aquino before finally retiring in 1989.

Pipino Cuevas fought during a period when an unusual number of accomplished welterweights were active: Sugar Ray Leonard, Wilfred Benítez, Carlos Palomino, Thomas Hearns, and Roberto Durán, although his reign had nearly come to an end as Leonard, Benítez, Hearns, and Durán emerged as welterweight champions. Cuevas successfully defended his welterweight title eleven times against ten different boxers over a four-year span. During his reign as champion, Cuevas fought the best opposition available to him. In total, the opponents he faced throughout his career had a combined record of 505-70-29. In 2003, The Ring listed Cuevas as number thirty-one on their list of the 100 greatest punchers of all time. In 2002, Cuevas became a member of the International Boxing Hall of Fame.

== Retirement ==
Cuevas is the owner of a restaurant and a security company in Mexico City. At one point of his career, he was also the owner of a famous sports and luxury car collection, and he was one of the first boxers to sport a golden tooth. Most people probably know him for his nickname Pipino, which is far more used to refer to him than Jose by fight commentators and magazine writers.

He ran into trouble with the law in 2001 when he was accused of racketeering in Mexico, in connection with a Mexican mayor. But he was declared innocent in 2002.

His record as a boxer was of 35 wins and 15 losses, with 31 wins by knockout.

== Professional boxing record ==
50 fights	35 wins	15 losses
By knockout	31	6
By decision	4	9

No.	Result	Record	Opponent	Type	Round	Date	Location	Notes
50	Loss	35–15	Lupe Aquino	KO	2 (10)	25 Sep 1989	Tijuana, Baja California, Mexico	
49	Win	35–14	Martín Martínez	KO	1 (10)	31 Jul 1989	Tijuana, Baja California, Mexico	
48	Win	34–14	Francisco Carballo	KO	4 (10)	29 May 1989	Tijuana, Baja California, Mexico	
47	Win	33–14	Daniel Valenzuela	KO	6 (10)	25 Jul 1987	Mexico City, Mexico	
46	Loss	32–14	Jorge Vaca	KO	2 (10)	19 Dec 1986	Guadalajara, Jalisco, Mexico	
45	Loss	32–13	Lorenzo Luis García	MD	10	4 Oct 1986	Salta, Salta, Argentina	
44	Win	32–12	Luis Mateo	TKO	3 (10)	25 Jul 1986	UIC Pavilion, Chicago, Illinois, US	
43	Loss	31–12	Steve Little	MD	10	3 Mar 1986	Sacramento, California, US	
42	Win	31–11	Felipe Vaca	UD	4	25 Feb 1986	Forum, Inglewood, California, US	
41	Loss	30–11	Herman Montes	KO	3 (10)	7 Mar 1985	Olympic Auditorium, Los Angeles, California, US	
40	Loss	30–10	Jun-Suk Hwang	MD	10	12 Jul 1984	Olympic Auditorium, Los Angeles, California, US	
39	Win	30–9	Mauricio Bravo	TKO	1 (10)	1 Mar 1984	Olympic Auditorium, Los Angeles, California, US	
38	Loss	29–9	Roberto Durán	TKO	4 (12)	29 Jan 1983	Sports Arena, Los Angeles, California, US	
37	Loss	29–8	Roger Stafford	UD	10	7 Nov 1981	Hacienda Hotel, Las Vegas, Nevada, US	The Ring magazine Upset of the Year
36	Win	29–7	Jørgen Hansen	TKO	1 (10)	25 Jun 1981	Astrodome, Houston, Texas, US	
35	Win	28–7	Bernardo Prada	KO	2 (10)	7 Feb 1981	Olympic Auditorium, Los Angeles, California, US	
34	Loss	27–7	Thomas Hearns	TKO	2 (15)	2 Aug 1980	Joe Louis Arena, Detroit, Michigan, US	Lost WBA welterweight title
33	Win	27–6	Harold Volbrecht	KO	5 (15)	6 Apr 1980	Astro Arena, Houston, Texas, US	Retained WBA welterweight title
32	Win	26–6	Ángel Espada	TKO	10 (15)	8 Dec 1979	Sports Arena, Los Angeles, California, US	Retained WBA welterweight title
31	Win	25–6	Randy Shields	UD	15	30 Jul 1979	International Amphitheatre, Chicago, Illinois, US	Retained WBA welterweight title
30	Win	24–6	Scott Clark	TKO	2 (15)	29 Jan 1979	Forum, Inglewood, California, US	Retained WBA welterweight title
29	Win	23–6	Pete Ranzany	TKO	2 (15)	9 Sep 1978	Hughes Arena, Sacramento, California, US	Retained WBA welterweight title
28	Win	22–6	Billy Backus	TKO	2 (15)	20 May 1978	Forum, Inglewood, California, US	Retained WBA welterweight title
27	Win	21–6	Harold Weston	TKO	9 (15)	4 Mar 1978	Olympic Auditorium, Los Angeles, California, US	Retained WBA welterweight title
26	Win	20–6	Ángel Espada	TKO	12 (15)	19 Nov 1977	Coliseo Roberto Clemente, San Juan, Puerto Rico	Retained WBA welterweight title
25	Win	19–6	Clyde Gray	KO	2 (15)	6 Aug 1977	Olympic Auditorium, Los Angeles, California, US	Retained WBA welterweight title
24	Win	18–6	Miguel Ángel Campanino	KO	2 (15)	12 Mar 1977	Arena Mexico, Mexico City, Mexico	Retained WBA welterweight title
23	Win	17–6	Shoji Tsujimoto	KO	6 (15)	27 Oct 1976	Jissen Rinri Hall, Kanazawa, Ishikawa, Japan	Retained WBA welterweight title
22	Win	16–6	Ángel Espada	TKO	2 (15)	17 Jul 1976	Plaza de Toros Calafia, Mexicali, Baja California, Mexico	Won WBA welterweight title
21	Loss	15–6	Andy Price	UD	10	2 Jun 1976	Sports Arena, Los Angeles, California, US	
20	Win	15–5	Rafael Piamonte	KO	1 (10)	3 Apr 1976	Plaza de Toros Calafia, Mexicali, Baja California, Mexico	
19	Win	14–5	José Palacios	KO	10 (12)	27 Sep 1975	Arena Mexico, Mexico City, Mexico	Won Mexico welterweight title
18	Win	13–5	Carlos Obregón	UD	10	12 Jul 1975	Palacio de los Deportes, Mexico City, Mexico	
17	Win	12–5	Rubén Vázquez Zamora	UD	10	25 Jan 1975	Arena Mexico, Mexico City, Mexico	
16	Win	11–5	Sammy García	KO	3 (10)	26 Oct 1974	Mexico City, Mexico	
15	Win	10–5	José Luis Pena	KO	1 (10)	21 Aug 1974	Arena Coliseo, Mexico City, Mexico	
14	Win	9–5	Sugar Sanders	TKO	1 (10)	12 Jun 1974	Mexico City, Mexico	
13	Win	8–5	Salvador Ruvalcaba	KO	1 (10)	11 May 1974	Mexico City, Mexico	
12	Loss	7–5	Eleazar Delgado	MD	10	24 Nov 1973	Mexico City, Mexico	
11	Win	7–4	Octavio Amparan	TKO	7 (10)	6 Oct 1973	Arena Coliseo, Mexico City, Mexico	
10	Win	6–4	José Figueroa	TKO	3 (10)	4 Aug 1973	Mexico City, Mexico	
9	Loss	5–4	Memo Cruz	UD	10	13 May 1973	Mexico City, Mexico	
8	Win	5–3	Sergio Alejo	KO	4 (8)	1 Mar 1973	Mexico City, Mexico	
7	Win	4–3	Raúl Martínez	KO	1 (8)	7 Dec 1972	Mexico City, Mexico	
6	Loss	3–3	Juan Pablo Oropeza	MD	8	19 Aug 1972	Campeche, Campeche, Mexico	
5	Win	3–2	Pancho Benítez	TKO	2 (8)	22 Jun 1972	Mexico City, Mexico	
4	Win	2–2	Rielero Rodríguez	TKO	2 (6)	24 May 1972	Culiacan, Sinaloa, Mexico	
3	Loss	1–2	Mario Roman	MD	6	4 Mar 1972	Mexico City, Mexico	
2	Win	1–1	José Arias	TKO	4 (6)	1 Jan 1972	Mexico City, Mexico	
1	Loss	0–1	Alfredo Castro	KO	2 (4)	14 Nov 1971	Mexico City, Mexico	

== See also ==
- List of Mexican boxing world champions
- List of world welterweight boxing champions

Sporting positions
World boxing titles
Preceded by Ángel Espada	WBA welterweight champion 17 July 1976 – 2 August 1980	Succeeded by Thomas Hearns
