= Leszek Drogosz =

Polish boxer and actor

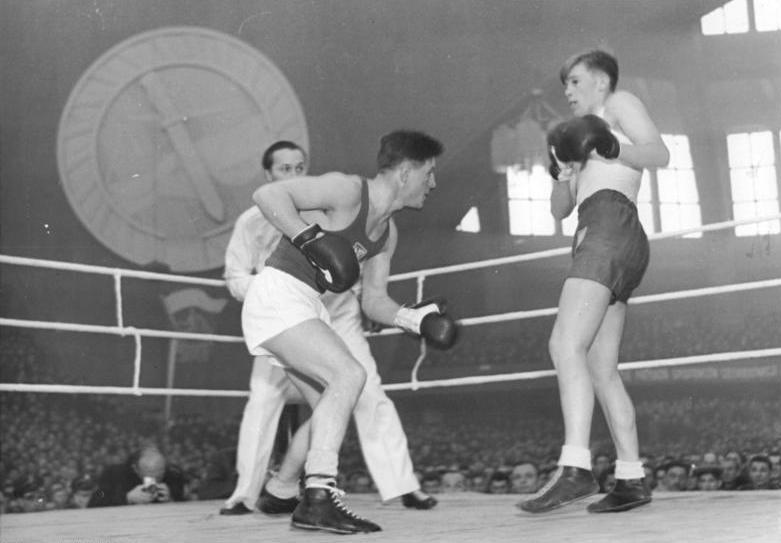
- Leszek Drogosz (on the right)

Medal record

Men's Boxing

Representing Poland

European Amateur Championships
Gold medal – first place	1953 Warsaw	Light Welterweight
Gold medal – first place	1955 West Berlin	Light Welterweight
Gold medal – first place	1959 Lucerne	Welterweight

Olympic Games
Bronze medal – third place	1960 Rome	Welterweight

Leszek Melchior Drogosz (6 January 1933 – 7 September 2012) was a Polish boxer and actor.

Drogosz was born in Kielce. He thrice won the gold medal at the European Amateur Boxing Championships in the Light welterweight division at Warsaw 1953 and West Berlin 1955, and in the Welterweight division at Lucerne 1959. He participated in the Summer Olympics in Helsinki 1952, Melbourne 1956, and Rome 1960. He won the bronze medal at the 1960 Summer Olympics in Rome.

He was eight-time winner of the Polish Boxing Championship (1953, 1954, 1955, 1958, 1960, 1961, 1964, 1967).

Following his boxing career, Drogosz became an actor in Polish movies. He played in fifteen movies. In 1966 he has appeared in the film Bokser directed by Julian Dziedzina. He twice played in the movies directed by Andrzej Wajda - Hunting Flies (Polish: Polowanie na muchy) in 1969, and Landscape After the Battle (Polish: Krajobraz po bitwie) in 1970.

In 1988, he was chosen the best Polish Sportspersonality of the Year 1953 (no award rewarded in 1953) in a Plebiscite of the Sport Review.

He was the winner of the Aleksander Reksza Boxing Award 1992.

He died of cancer in 2012.
