= Harold Weston (boxer) =

American boxer

Personal information
- Nationality: (United States) American
- Born: Harold Weston Jr. April 7, 1952 (age 74) New York City, New York, U.S.
- Height: 5 ft 8 in (173cm)
- Weight: Welterweight

Boxing career
- Stance: Orthodox

Boxing record
- Total fights: 40
- Wins: 26
- Win by KO: 7
- Losses: 9
- Draws: 5

Harold Weston (born April 7, 1952) is an American former professional welterweight boxer active from 1970 and 1979, who challenged for a world title twice.

== Early life ==
Harold Weston Jr. was born on April 7, 1952, in New York City, New York, United States.

== Amateur boxing career ==
He began fighting at the age of nine in a New York City Department of Parks and Recreation program.

At the 1969 New York Golden Gloves tournament held at Sunnyside Garden Arena in Queens, he defeated Eddie Mustafa Muhammad in the quarterfinals, then lost to Shoebe Streets in the semifinal.

On March 20, 1970, Weston, representing Telstar A.C., beat Ronald Columbus to become the 1970 New York Golden Gloves 147-pound Open Champion.

== Professional career ==
Early on in his career, he was trained and co-managed by his father, Harold Weston Sr. and Gil Clancy.

At 18, the former NY Golden Gloves champion made his pro debut with a win over Ralph Castner in Scranton, Pennsylvania, in July 1970. In his second professional bout, he beat Johnny Sears at Madison Square Garden. After opening his career with seven consecutive wins, Weston lost by an eight-round unanimous decision to Jose Rodriguez at Madison Square Garden's Felt Forum on January 22, 1971.

=== Bouts with Chu Chu Malave, 1971-1972 ===
He fought actor-turned-boxer Chu Chu Malave on August 9, 1971, in a special nine-rounder. The fight settled on nine rounds as a compromise between Malave's eight and Weston's ten. He lost a close split decision verdict. Weston controlled the early rounds, but Malave's left hook floored him in the fifth. In the ninth and final round, believing he had the lead, Weston eased up, allowing Malave to win by a narrow margin. He bounced back from his lost to Malave with three decision wins and a draw. A 10-round rematch was arranged to take place with Malave at MSG on March 10, 1972. After going all 10 rounds, he lost by unanimous decision.

He went on to lose his first rematch against Jose Rodriguez in May 1972. Following the fight, the Vietnam War draft paused his boxing career for 14 months, though he ran a boxing program while in the military and later received leave to resume his career.

While in the army, he took a fight against future WBC middleweight champion Vito Antuofermo who came into the match with a 17-0-1 record. At Felt Forum on July 9, 1973, he handed Antuofermo his first professional defeat via fifth-round stoppage caused by a cut over the eye.

He was able to fight twice while on leave from Fort Hood in Texas. He received his discharge from the U.S. Army around September 1974.

On October 7, 1974, Weston went ten rounds with Dominican welterweight champion Fausto Rodriguez in New York but lost by split decision. Rodriguez, then ranked third among the contenders for José Nápoles' world 147-pound title, was the first top-ranked contender Harold Weston faced. He met former world junior welterweight champion Bruno Arcari at the Palazzo Dello Sport in Turin, Italy, on February 28, 1975. He was outpointed over ten rounds, losing a decision to the Italian boxer. In his next fight, he fought to a 10-round draw with top welterweight contender Johnny Gant in Washington, D.C., on August 26, 1975.

The 23-year-old New Yorker traveled to Melbourne in September 1975 and scored a victory over Australian champion and third-ranked welterweight Rocky Mattioli. Upon returning to New York, he recorded back-to-back draws at the Garden against Hedgemon Lewis and Saoul Mamby. He then ventured to Paris, France, where he beat Jacques van Mellaerts in March 1976.

=== First bout with Wilfred Benítez, February 1977 ===
He fought to a draw with an undefeated Wilfred Benítez at Madison Square Garden in February 1977. The fight drew 10,930 fight fans. At the end of the bout, the judges each scored the contest 5–5 in rounds and points, but referee Johnny LoBianco awarded Benítez a 7–3 edge, leading to a majority decision and the first blemish on Benítez's record.

Following the draw with Benítez, he defeated Jimmy Heair and Andy Price by unanimous decision. Weston, holding the third spot in WBA rankings and fourth in WBC rankings, avenged his 1971 and 1972 defeats to Jose Rodriguez on October 27, 1977.

=== WBA welterweight championship bout with Cuevas, March 1978 ===
The welterweight contender earned a shot at José "Pipino" Cuevas's WBA welterweight title on March 4, 1978. The 15-round title bout at Los Angeles' Olympic Auditorium was stopped after the ninth round when it was thought that Weston's jaw was broken. Though the ringside physician hospitalized him for a suspected broken jaw, he only had a cut inside his mouth and resumed fighting after two months.

=== WBC welterweight championship bout with Benítez, March 1979 ===
He made another bid for a world title in a rematch with Wilfred Benítez. On March 25, 1979, he faced Benítez in a 15-round bout for Benítez's first defense of the WBC world welterweight title in San Juan, Puerto Rico. He went the distance but lost by decision.

Following the bout, in April 1979, the WBA ranked him second and the WBC fourth in the welterweight division.

=== Bout with Thomas Hearns, May 1979 ===
He faced Detroit's Thomas Hearns in a 10-round bout in Las Vegas on May 20, 1979. The fight was stopped in the sixth round after Weston sustained an eye injury. The 27-year-old fighter underwent surgery on his right eye on May 25, 1979, at the Manhattan Eye and Ear Hospital.

He tried to return to the ring, but the New York State Athletic Commission did not allow it. He retired from boxing after suffering a 90% detached retina during the Hearns bout.

Weston compiled a record of 26-9-5 with seven knockouts. 10 of his 40 pro fights took place at Madison Square Garden.

== Post-boxing career ==
He became assistant matchmaker for the boxing department of Madison Square Garden in December 1980. He was named to the post by Gil Clancy after Jak Brami left to accept a position in San Juan. He held the role until his resignation in 1986.

In 1981, he launched a program targeting athletes, boxers, and others who couldn't read well. His inspiration came when Search for Tomorrow, a soap opera, needed 10 boxers for a scene, and only three of the men he sent over could read the script. Héctor Camacho and Juan Laporte were among his first star pupils.

== Professional boxing record ==
| 40 fights | 26 wins | 9 losses |
|---|---|---|
| By knockout | 7 | 2 |
| By decision | 19 | 7 |
| Draws | 5 | |
