= Franz Koschina =

Austrian boxer

Personal information
- Nationality: Austrian
- Born: 2 April 1939 (age 85); Zistersdorf, Austria

Sport
- Sport: Boxing

Franz Koschina (born 2 April 1939) is an Austrian boxer. He competed in the men's welterweight event at the 1960 Summer Olympics.
