= Bruno Guse =

German boxer

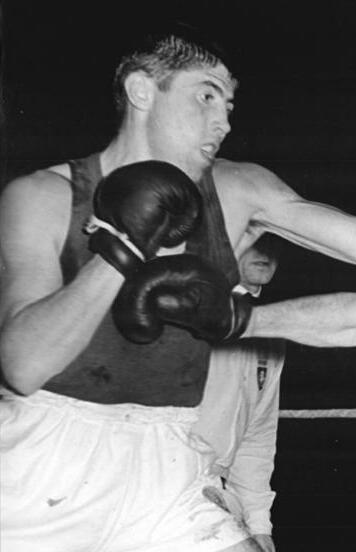
- Guse in 1964

Personal information
- Nationality: German
- Born: 13 July 1939 Blahodatne, Ukrainian SSR, Soviet Union
- Died: 1 March 2019 (aged 79)

Sport
- Sport: Boxing

Bruno Guse (13 July 1939 – 1 March 2019) was a German boxer. He competed at the 1960 Summer Olympics and the 1964 Summer Olympics. At the 1960 Summer Olympics, he lost to the eventual silver medalist Yuri Radonyak of the Soviet Union, and at the 1964 Summer Olympics, he lost to Ričardas Tamulis, also of the Soviet Union, who also went on to win the silver medal at those Olympics.
