= Tomislav Kelava =

Serbian boxer

Personal information
- Nationality: Serbian
- Born: 10 August 1933 (age 92) Cevo, Yugoslavia

Sport
- Sport: Boxing

Tomislav Kelava (born 10 August 1933) is a Serbian boxer. He competed in the men's welterweight event at the 1960 Summer Olympics.
