= Delești =

- Commune
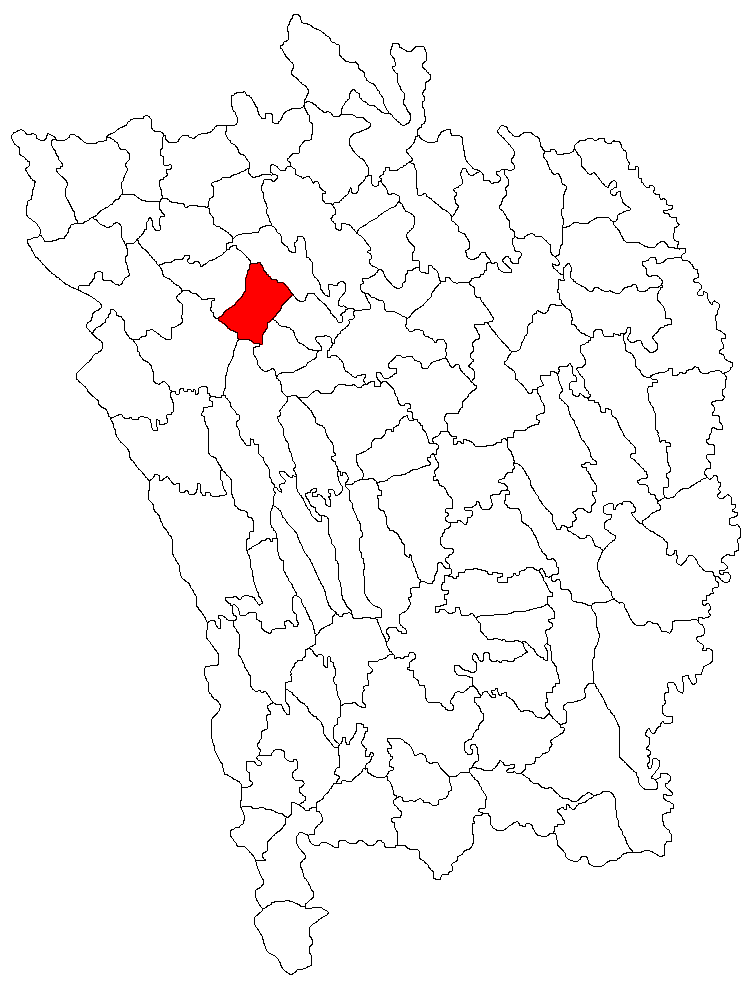
- Location in Vaslui County

- Location in Romania
- Coordinates: 46°42′N 27°33′E
- Country: Romania
- County: Vaslui
- Subdivisions: Albești, Delești, Fundătura, Hârșova, Mânăstirea, Răduiești

Government
  - Mayor (2020–2024): Doru Eșanu (PNL)
- Population (2021-12-01): 1,861
- Time zone: EET/EEST (UTC+2/+3)
- Vehicle reg.: VS

Delești is a commune in Vaslui County, Western Moldavia, Romania. It is composed of six villages: Albești, Delești, Fundătura, Hârșova, Mănăstirea, and Răduiești. It also included four other villages until 2004, when these were split off to form Cozmești Commune.

== Natives ==
- Vasile Neagu (born 1940), boxer
