= Marcos Geraldo =

Mexican national champion boxer (b. 1954)

Personal information
- Nickname: Marcos Geraldo
- Born: Marco Antonio López Geraldo; September 28, 1954 (age 71) Guaymas, Sonora, Mexico
- Height: 5 ft 11 in (180 cm)
- Weight: Middleweight/light heavyweight

Boxing career
- Reach: 76 in (193 cm)
- Stance: orthodox

Boxing record
- Total fights: 95
- Wins: 66
- Win by KO: 47
- Losses: 28
- Draws: 1

Marcos López (born September 28, 1954), better known as Marcos Geraldo, is a Mexican former boxer who was champion at both middleweight and light heavyweight.

== Career ==
Geraldo was born in Sonora, Mexico, and fought out of Baja California for much of his career. Geraldo's first professional fight was in September 1970, a points defeat of Albaro Parra. In 1977 he won the Mexico middleweight title, defeating Emetrio Villanueva by a knockout. After two successful defences he moved up to the light heavyweight division, beating David Cabrera to become Mexico light-middleweight champion in November 1982. He also won the California State Middleweight title in 1978.

In 1979 he suffered a points defeat to Sugar Ray Leonard over ten rounds, with the same result a year later against Marvin Hagler. He was ranked in the top ten by both the WBC and WBA in 1980. He fought Thomas Hearns in 1982, losing by a first round knockout. Leonard ranked his fight with Geraldo as his fourth toughest, behind those against Hearns, Wilfred Benítez, and Roberto Durán, and regarded Geraldo as the hardest puncher he had fought. In 1985 Geraldo drew with Prince Mama Mohammed in a Stroh's Cruiserweight Championship fight, and lost to Michael Nunn by a fifth round TKO. He fought Virgil Hill in 1987, losing by a second round knockout. He continued fighting until 1995, losing his final fight to Leonardo Aguilar.

He also lost to Angel Robinson Garcia.

Over his 25-year professional career he won 66 of 95 fights, 47 by knockout.

His son, Marcos Antonio López, is also a professional boxer.
