= Ángel Espada =

Puerto Rican boxer

Ángel Luis Espada Mangual
Personal information
- Nickname: Cholo
- Nationality: Puerto Rico
- Born: February 2, 1948 (age 78) Salinas, Puerto Rico
- Height: 5 ft 9 in (175 cm)
- Weight: Welterweight

Boxing career
- Stance: orthodox

Boxing record
- Total fights: 59
- Wins: 44
- Win by KO: 27
- Losses: 11
- Draws: 4

Ángel Luis "Cholo" Espada Mangual (born February 2, 1948) is a Puerto Rican former professional boxer. He was the WBA's world Welterweight champion in 1975-76. A music lover, Espada also organized, during the late 1970s, a salsa orchestra.

== Biography ==
=== Early career ===
Espada began his professional boxing career on March 11, 1967, with a defeat at the hands of future Antonio Cervantes world title challenger Josue Marquez, on a six-round decision, at San Juan. His next two fights were declared draws (ties). Both were against Luis Vinales.

After another defeat and a draw (both against Chris Fernandez), Espada got his first win. On April 1, 1968, he knocked out Linfer Contreras in the first round in San Juan. After one more win, he fought outside Puerto Rico for the first time, losing on points after six rounds to future Roberto Durán world title challenger Jimmy Robertson, on September 27, 1969, at Los Angeles, California.

His next fight would be against Bobby Joe Hughes, April 9, 1969 in San Juan. Hughes was disqualified for using illegal tactics during the fight, and this victory marked the beginning of a fifteen fight winning streak for Espada. On November 7 of 1970, the streak was stopped by Matt Donovan, who beat him on points over ten rounds. Shortly after, Espada would beat former Emile Griffith world title challenger Manuel Gonzalez and lose to former world champion Eddie Perkins, both times, on points after ten rounds.

Between 1972 and 1975, Espada posted twelve wins in a row, including a victory over perennial world title challenger Armando Muniz, and a win in Panama. He was beaten by Luis Acosta in Caracas by decision in ten rounds to stop that winning streak, but he avenged the defeat against Acosta with a ten-round win over him in a rematch held in San Juan.

=== Champion ===
Espada became a world champion in a situation that could be described by some as bizarre: the undisputed world Welterweight champion of the era, José Nápoles, was to fight Carlos Monzón for the world's Middleweight title. The WBC kept recognizing Nápoles as their world Welterweight champion, but the WBA, feeling that Espada deserved a chance at Nápoles' crown, decided to strip Nápoles of the world championship because Nápoles went ahead as planned and fought Monzon. Thus, on June 28, 1975, Espada became the WBA's world Welterweight champion, and Puerto Rico's fourth world boxing champion in history, by outpointing the well known Canadian, Clyde Gray, over fifteen rounds in San Juan. Coincidentally, Espada won his world title the same week that Alfredo Escalera won the WBC world Junior Lightweight championship at a fight that took place in Japan; this was the first time two Puerto Ricans became world champions the same week and as a consequence, Puerto Rico, a country that had only produced three world boxing champions in its history, almost doubled their number of champions in one week with Espada and Escalera's victories. (In Spanish)

He retained the title with a fifteen-round decision over Johnny Gant, and won a non-title fight with an eighth-round knockout over Alfonzo Hayman.

On July 17, 1976, Espada fought what would have been the start of a Mexican boxing tour. Espada, looking forward to meeting Miguel Campanino, was instead faced with a boxer who had a record of 16-5 and who was named José Cuevas. Cuevas lifted the WBA world Welterweight title away from Espada with a second-round knockout. They would fight again twice more, with Cuevas retaining the title by ten and eleven-round knockouts.

=== Retirement from the Ring ===
Towards the end of his career, Espada, realizing his best days as a boxer had probably passed him by, announced on the Vea magazine that he was putting together a salsa orchestra. The "Cholo Espada orchestra" had some success in Puerto Rico, appearing on television shows constantly during the late 1970s and early 1980s.

Espada lost his last important fight, against Thomas Hearns, by a knockout in round four at the Joe Louis Arena, in Detroit, on March 2 of 1980. He then retired for a short period of time. Espada wanted to retire as a winner, however, and, after one year of inactivity, he made a one fight comeback, knocking out Julio Alfonso in four rounds, on December 10, 1981, in San Juan.

After retiring from boxing, Espada became a boxing trainer, and he has remained in that position ever since. Espada had a record of 44 wins, 11 losses and 3 draws, with 27 wins by knockout.

== Professional boxing record ==
59 fights	44 wins	11 losses
By knockout	27	4
By decision	16	7
By disqualification	1	0
Draws	4	

No.	Result	Record	Opponent	Type	Round	Date	Location	Notes
59	Win	44–11–4	Julio Alfonso	KO	4 (?)	Dec 10, 1981	Coliseo Roberto Clemente, San Juan, Puerto Rico	
58	Loss	43–11–4	Thomas Hearns	TKO	4 (12)	Mar 2, 1980	Joe Louis Arena, Detroit, Michigan, U.S.	For vacant USBA welterweight title
57	Loss	43–10–4	Pipino Cuevas	TKO	10 (15)	Dec 8, 1979	Sports Arena, Los Angeles, California, U.S.	For WBA welterweight title
56	Win	43–9–4	Fitzroy Edward	KO	5 (?)	Jun 16, 1979	Coliseo Roberto Clemente, San Juan, Puerto Rico	
55	Win	42–9–4	Sam Hailstock	KO	9 (10)	Feb 18, 1979	Hiram Bithorn Stadium, San Juan, Puerto Rico	
54	Win	41–9–4	Kevin Moefield	KO	4 (10)	Oct 28, 1978	Coliseo Roberto Clemente, San Juan, Puerto Rico	
53	Win	40–9–4	Nikita Tarhocker	KO	2 (10)	Sep 9, 1978	Hiram Bithorn Stadium, San Juan, Puerto Rico	
52	Loss	39–9–4	Pipino Cuevas	RTD	11 (15)	Nov 19, 1977	Coliseo Roberto Clemente, San Juan, Puerto Rico	For WBA welterweight title
51	Win	39–8–4	Ray Hammond	UD	10	Aug 27, 1977	Coliseo Roberto Clemente, San Juan, Puerto Rico	
50	Win	38–8–4	John Morgan	KO	2 (?)	May 21, 1977	Coliseo Roberto Clemente, San Juan, Puerto Rico	
49	Win	37–8–4	Augustin Estrada	KO	4 (?)	Sep 10, 1976	Estadio Juan Ramon Loubriel, Bayamon, Puerto Rico	
48	Loss	36–8–4	Pipino Cuevas	TKO	2 (15)	Jul 17, 1976	Plaza de Toros Calafia, Mexicali, Baja California, Mexico	Lost WBA welterweight title
47	Win	36–7–4	Alfonso Hayman	TKO	8 (10)	Apr 27, 1976	Coliseo Roberto Clemente, San Juan, Puerto Rico	
46	Win	35–7–4	Johnny Gant	UD	15	Oct 11, 1975	Coliseo Roberto Clemente, San Juan, Puerto Rico	Retained WBA welterweight title
45	Win	34–7–4	Clyde Gray	UD	15	Jun 28, 1975	Coliseo Roberto Clemente, San Juan, Puerto Rico	Won vacant WBA welterweight title
44	Win	33–7–4	Luis Acosta	PTS	10	Apr 12, 1975	San Juan, Puerto Rico	
43	Loss	32–7–4	Luis Acosta	PTS	10	Mar 15, 1975	El Poliedro, Caracas, Venezuela	
42	Win	32–6–4	Hector Rivas	KO	2 (?)	Nov 15, 1974	San Juan, Puerto Rico	
41	Win	31–6–4	Armando Muñíz	PTS	10	Jul 29, 1974	San Juan, Puerto Rico	
40	Win	30–6–4	Dave Oropeza	KO	4 (10)	May 10, 1974	Coliseo Roberto Clemente, San Juan, Puerto Rico	
39	Win	29–6–4	Alvin Anderson	KO	2 (10)	Apr 15, 1974	San Juan, Puerto Rico	
38	Win	28–6–4	Mario Saurennann	PTS	10	Nov 19, 1973	San Juan, Puerto Rico	
37	Win	27–6–4	Prince Jimmy Hamm	KO	1 (12)	Sep 8, 1973	Gimnasio Nuevo Panama, Panama City, Panama	Won vacant WBA Fedelatin welterweight title
36	Win	26–6–4	Al Cook	TKO	3 (10)	Jul 14, 1973	Coliseo Roberto Clemente, San Juan, Puerto Rico	
35	Win	25–6–4	Jack Tillman	UD	10	May 29, 1973	Civic Center, Baltimore, Maryland, U.S.	
34	Win	24–6–4	Roscoe Bell	PTS	10	Feb 15, 1973	Coliseo Roberto Clemente, San Juan, Puerto Rico	
33	Win	23–6–4	Roscoe Bell	KO	2 (10)	Jan 16, 1973	Auditorium, Miami Beach, Florida, U.S.	
32	Win	22–6–4	Felipe Cariaco	KO	9 (10)	Dec 12, 1972	San Juan, Puerto Rico	
31	Win	21–6–4	Alfonso Aguirre	TKO	3 (10)	Oct 24, 1972	Municipal Auditorium, San Antonio, Texas, U.S.	
30	Loss	20–6–4	Dario Hidalgo	SD	10	Jun 12, 1972	Felt Forum, Manhattan, New York City, New York, U.S.	
29	Loss	20–5–4	Eddie Perkins	UD	10	Oct 19, 1971	Hiram Bithorn Stadium, San Juan, Puerto Rico	
28	Win	20–4–4	Manuel Gonzalez	PTS	10	Aug 28, 1971	San Juan, Puerto Rico	
27	Win	19–4–4	Dino Del Cid	KO	3 (?)	Jul 10, 1971	San Juan, Puerto Rico	
26	Win	18–4–4	Edmundo Leite	MD	10	Apr 12, 1971	Felt Forum, Manhattan, New York City, New York, U.S.	
25	Loss	17–4–4	Matt Donovan	MD	10	Nov 7, 1970	Hiram Bithorn Stadium, San Juan, Puerto Rico	
24	Win	17–3–4	Jose Gabino	KO	3 (10)	Oct 10, 1970	San Juan, Puerto Rico	
23	Win	16–3–4	Julio Cruz	KO	2 (?)	Aug 5, 1970	San Juan, Puerto Rico	
22	Win	15–3–4	Frankie Lewis	KO	6 (?)	May 10, 1970	Ponce, Puerto Rico	
21	Win	14–3–4	Juan Ramos	KO	5 (?)	Mar 28, 1970	Ponce, Puerto Rico	
20	Win	13–3–4	Raul Rodriguez	KO	2 (10)	Mar 21, 1970	Mexico City, Distrito Federal, Mexico	
19	Win	12–3–4	Frankie Lewis	PTS	10	Feb 27, 1970	San Juan, Puerto Rico	
18	Win	11–3–4	Frank Steele	PTS	10	Feb 7, 1970	San Juan, Puerto Rico	
17	Win	10–3–4	Fate Davis	PTS	10	Dec 12, 1969	San Juan, Puerto Rico	
16	Win	9–3–4	Jerry Graci	PTS	10	Nov 2, 1969	San Juan, Puerto Rico	Exact date unknown
15	Win	8–3–4	Roland Pryor	PTS	10	Nov 1, 1969	San Juan, Puerto Rico	
14	Win	7–3–4	Claude Soumel	PTS	8	Sep 27, 1969	La Cancha Country Club, San Juan, Puerto Rico	
13	Win	6–3–4	Ingemar Jones	KO	4 (?)	Aug 2, 1969	La Cancha Country Club, San Juan, Puerto Rico	
12	Win	5–3–4	Roscoe Bell	KO	2 (8)	Jul 21, 1969	San Juan, Puerto Rico	
11	Win	4–3–4	Enrique Paz	TKO	5 (8)	Jun 7, 1969	Hiram Bithorn Stadium, San Juan, Puerto Rico	
10	Win	3–3–4	Bobby Joe Hughes	DQ	6 (?)	Apr 19, 1969	San Juan, Puerto Rico	
9	Loss	2–3–4	Jimmy Robertson	PTS	6	Sep 27, 1968	Memorial Coliseum, Los Angeles, California, U.S.	
8	Win	2–2–4	Embijao Carrion	KO	3 (?)	Apr 15, 1968	Country Club Arena, San Juan, Puerto Rico	
7	Win	1–2–4	Linfer Contreras	KO	1 (6)	Apr 1, 1968	Hiram Bithorn Stadium, San Juan, Puerto Rico	
6	Draw	0–2–4	Chris Fernandez	PTS	6	Jan 10, 1968	San Juan, Puerto Rico	
5	Loss	0–2–3	Chris Fernandez	PTS	6	Jul 10, 1967	San Juan, Puerto Rico	
4	Draw	0–1–3	Luis Vinales	PTS	6	Jun 4, 1967	Hiram Bithorn Stadium, San Juan, Puerto Rico	
3	Draw	0–1–2	Luis Vinales	PTS	6	Apr 8, 1967	Cancha Pepin Cestero, Bayamon, Puerto Rico	
2	Loss	0–1–1	Josue Marquez	PTS	6	Feb 11, 1967	Hiram Bithorn Stadium, San Juan, Puerto Rico	
1	Draw	0–0–1	Andres Matta	PTS	6	Aug 20, 1966	San Juan, Puerto Rico	

== See also ==
- List of world welterweight boxing champions
- List of Puerto Rican boxing world champions
- Sports in Puerto Rico
- Afro–Puerto Ricans

Sporting positions
Regional boxing titles
New title	WBA Fedalatin welterweight champion September 8, 1973 – June 28, 1975; Won world title	Vacant Title next held by Wellington Wheatley
World boxing titles
Vacant Title last held by José Nápoles	WBA welterweight champion June 28, 1975 – July 17, 1976	Succeeded by José Cuevas
