= René Grün =

Luxembourgish boxer

Personal information
- Nationality: Luxembourgish
- Born: 18 February 1933; Luxembourg, Luxembourg
- Died: 27 May 2004 (aged 71); Esch-sur-Alzette, Luxembourg

Sport
- Sport: Boxing

René Grün (18 February 1933 – 27 May 2004) was a Luxembourgish boxer. He competed in the men's welterweight event at the 1960 Summer Olympics.
