= Bunny Grant =

Jamaican boxer (1940–2018)

Personal information
- Nickname: Bunny
- Born: George Leslie Grant; 29 September 1940 Colony of Jamaica, British Empire
- Died: 1 November 2018 (aged 78)
- Height: 5 ft 7 in (1.70 m)
- Weight: featherweight super featherweight lightweight light welterweight welterweight light middleweight

Boxing career
- Reach: 69 in (175 cm)

Boxing record
- Total fights: 73
- Wins: 53 (KO 14)
- Losses: 15 (KO 2)
- Draws: 5

George Leslie "Bunny" Grant (29 September 1940 – 1 November 2018) was a Jamaican professional feather/super feather/light/light welter/welterweight/light middleweight boxer of the 1950s, '60s and '70s who won the Jamaican lightweight title, Jamaican welterweight title, Central American light welterweight Title, Latin American junior welterweight title, and British Commonwealth lightweight title, and was a challenger for the World Boxing Council (WBC) light welterweight title and World Boxing Association (WBA) World light welterweight title against Eddie Perkins, Commonwealth welterweight title against Clyde Gray, his professional fighting weight varied from 125 1/2 pounds (56.9 kg), i.e. featherweight to 152 1/2 pounds (69.2 kg), i.e. light middleweight. Bunny Grant was managed by Jacques Deschamps, and Pancho Rankine (circa 1962), and trained by Harry Wiley (circa 1962). He died on 1 November 2018.
