= Roberto Cruz (boxer) =

Filipino boxer

Personal information
- Nationality: Filipino
- Born: Roberto de la Cruz; November 21, 1941 (age 84) Baguio, Benguet, Commonwealth of the Philippines (now Philippines)
- Height: 5 ft 9 1/2 in (177 cm)
- Weight: Featherweight; Light welterweight; Welterweight

Boxing career
- Stance: Orthodox

Boxing record
- Total fights: 44
- Wins: 29
- Win by KO: 12
- Losses: 12
- Draws: 3

Roberto Dela Cruz (born November 21, 1941, in Baguio, Philippine Commonwealth) is a first Filipino former professional boxer. Cruz won the WBA light-welterweight title in a career that spanned from 1955 to 1968.

== Early life ==
Roberto Cruz was born on November 21, 1941, in Baguio, Philippines.

== Professional career ==
Cruz made his professional debut on February 10, 1955, losing to Laureano Llarenas via a four round points decision. It took until his third fight to achieve his first victory, beating Peping Cortez with a third round knockout. Cruz's first title success came on October 1, 1959, when he beat Leo Espinosa over twelve rounds for the Philippines Games & Amusement Board (GAB) Featherweight title. Over the next three years Cruz also won the GAB Welterweight title but also suffered five defeats in non-title bouts.

On March 21, 1963, Cruz fought outside the Philippines for the first time as he travelled to the United States to fight the Mexican boxer Battling Torres for the vacant WBA Light Welterweight title. The fight took place at Dodger Stadium, Los Angeles as part of a title triple-header which also featured; Emile Griffith vs Luis Manuel Rodriguez at welterweight and Sugar Ramos vs Davey Moore at featherweight. Cruz, who was the underdog, knocked Torres out in the first round to win the title. However, the night will be remembered more for the hospitalization and eventual death of Moore following his fight with Ramos. For the first defence of his title Cruz returned to the Philippines to fight the American Eddie Perkins on June 15, 1963. Perkins, a former world champion, won the fight with a fifteen round points victory in front of 25,000 fans at the Rizal Baseball Stadium. The fight started badly for Cruz as he was knocked down in the opening round and badly hurt in the third and sixth rounds. Although he was able to last the distance, he was unable to retain his title and would never fight for a world championship again.

The final fight of Cruz's professional career took place on September 28, 1968, in Angeles City, Philippines, where he was knocked out in the third round by Fel Pedranza.

== Professional boxing record ==
44 fights	29 wins	12 losses
By knockout	12	3
By decision	17	9
Draws	3	

No.	Result	Record	Opponent	Type	Round, time	Date	Location	Notes
44	Loss	29–12–3	Fel Pedranza	KO	3 (?)	1968-09-28	Angeles City, Philippines	
43	Loss	29–11–3	Takeshi Fuji	KO	2 (10)	1968-04-02	Nakajima Sports Center, Sapporo, Japan	
42	Win	29–10–3	Masakatsu Narita	KO	9 (10)	1967-09-09	Araneta Coliseum, Quezon City, Philippines	
41	Draw	28–10–3	Carl Peñalosa	PTS	10 (10)	1966-10-29	Cebu Coliseum, Cebu City, Philippines	
40	Win	28–10–2	Carl Peñalosa	PTS	10 (10)	1966-07-10	Cebu Coliseum, Cebu City, Philippines	
39	Win	27–10–2	Rocky Montante	KO	5 (?)	1965-09-18	Araneta Coliseum, Quezon City, Philippines	
38	Loss	26–10–2	Peter Cobblah	PTS	10 (10)	1965-01-23	Manila, Philippines	
37	Win	26–9–2	Flash Tac Bolano	KO	3 (?)	1963-12-21	Rizal Memorial Coliseum, Manila, Philippines	
36	Loss	25–9–2	Eddie Perkins	UD	15 (15)	1963-06-15	Rizal Memorial Coliseum, Manila, Philippines	Lost WBA light-welterweight title; For inaugural WBC and vacant The Ring light-welterweight titles
35	Win	25–8–2	Raymundo Torres	KO	1 (15)	1963-03-21	Dodger Stadium, Los Angeles, California, U.S.	Won vacant WBA light-welterweight title
34	Win	24–8–2	Terry Flores	KO	6 (12)	1962-09-15	Araneta Coliseum, Quezon City, Philippines	Retained Filipino (GAB) welterweight title
33	Loss	23–8–2	Shigemasa Kawakami	KO	3 (10)	1962-04-07	Araneta Coliseum, Quezon City, Philippines	
32	Win	23–7–2	Munchai Rorfortor	PTS	10 (10)	1962-01-10	Araneta Coliseum, Quezon City, Philippines	
31	Loss	22–7–2	Johnny Gonsalves	UD	10 (10)	1961-10-21	Araneta Coliseum, Quezon City, Philippines	
30	Win	22–6–2	Gary Cowburn	PTS	10 (10)	1961-08-05	Araneta Coliseum, Quezon City, Philippines	
29	Win	21–6–2	Rocky Kalingo	UD	12 (12)	1961-04-26	Araneta Coliseum, Quezon City, Philippines	Won vacant Filipino (GAB) welterweight title
28	Draw	20–6–2	J D Ellis	PTS	10 (10)	1960-11-19	Quezon City, Philippines	
27	Loss	20–6–1	Solomon Boysaw	SD	10 (10)	1960-07-09	Araneta Coliseum, Quezon City, Philippines	
26	Loss	20–5–1	Solomon Boysaw	PTS	10 (10)	1960-06-04	Araneta Coliseum, Quezon City, Philippines	
25	Win	20–4–1	Sompong Pitakasmut	KO	5 (?)	1960-04-02	Manila, Philippines	
24	Loss	19–4–1	Young Terror	PTS	10 (10)	1960-01-23	Zamboanga City, Philippines	
23	Win	19–3–1	Flashy Panio	PTS	8 (8)	1959-12-19	Barguio mountain retreat, Baguio, Philippines	
22	Win	18–3–1	Paulito Escarlan	PTS	10 (10)	1959-12-06	FEU Gymnasium, Manila, Philippines	
21	Win	17–3–1	Leo Espinosa	UD	12 (12)	1959-10-01	Manila, Philippines	Won Filipino (GAB) featherweight title
20	Win	16–3–1	Flashy Panio	PTS	8 (8)	1959-07-26	Calumpit, Philippines	
19	Win	15–3–1	Gil Flores	KO	8 (12)	1959-06-05	Manila, Philippines	
18	Win	14–3–1	Tanny Campo	PTS	10 (10)	1959-03-21	Rizal Memorial Coliseum, Manila, Philippines	
17	Win	13–3–1	Army Wonder Boy	KO	7 (?)	1958-11-21	Quezon City, Philippines	
16	Win	12–3–1	Rudy Lopez	KO	2 (?)	1958-10-31	Manila, Philippines	
15	Win	11–3–1	Larry Fernandez	PTS	8 (8)	1958-09-19	Manila, Philippines	
14	Win	10–3–1	Dio Cagulada	KO	3 (8)	1958-08-18	Quezon City, Philippines	
13	Loss	9–3–1	Ernie Masangkay	PTS	8 (8)	1958-04-25	San Fernando, Philippines	
12	Win	9–2–1	Peping Cortez	KO	3 (?)	1958-03-22	Guagua, Philippines	
11	Draw	8–2–1	Tiger Willie	PTS	6 (6)	1958-02-01	Rizal Memorial Coliseum, Manila, Philippines	
10	Win	8–2	Ernie Paredes	PTS	6 (6)	1957-11-29	Manila, Philippines	
9	Win	7–2	Pancho Dilla	PTS	6 (6)	1957-10-23	Rizal Memorial Coliseum, Manila, Philippines	
8	Win	6–2	Max Posadas Jr	PTS	4 (4)	1957-08-01	Olongapo, Philippines	
7	Loss	5–2	Dixie Logan	PTS	6 (6)	1957-04-01	Philippines	
6	Win	5–1	?	KO	? (?)	1956-12-01	Philippines	
5	Win	4–1	Rudy Santamaria	PTS	4 (4)	1956-08-01	Baguio, Philippines	
4	Win	3–1	?	PTS	4 (4)	1956-03-01	Philippines	
3	Win	2–1	?	PTS	4 (4)	1955-10-01	Philippines	
2	Win	1–1	?	PTS	4 (4)	1955-06-01	Manila, Philippines	
1	Loss	0–1	Laureano Llarenas	PTS	4 (4)	1955-02-10	Philippines	

== See also ==
- List of male boxers
- List of Filipino boxing world champions
- List of world light-welterweight boxing champions

Sporting positions
Regional boxing titles
Preceded by Leo Espinosa	Filipino (GAB) featherweight champion October 1, 1959 – 1959; Vacated	Vacant Title next held by Little Cezar
Vacant Title last held by Javellana Kid	Filipino (GAB) welterweight champion April 26, 1961 – March 21, 1963; Won world title	Vacant Title next held by Fel Pedranza
World boxing titles
Vacant Title last held by Duilio Loi	WBA light-welterweight champion March 21, 1963 – June 15, 1963	Succeeded by Eddie Perkins
