= Max Meier =

Swiss boxer (born 1936)

Personal information
- Nationality: Swiss
- Born: 20 May 1936 (age 90) Wil, Switzerland

Sport
- Sport: Boxing

Max Meier (born 20 May 1936) is a Swiss boxer. He competed in the men's welterweight event at the 1960 Summer Olympics.
