= Andrés Navarro (boxer) =

Spanish boxer (1938–2021)

Personal information
- Full name: Andrés Navarro Moreno
- Nationality: Spanish
- Born: 15 February 1938; Barcelona, Spain
- Died: 18 August 2021 (aged 83)

Sport
- Sport: Boxing

Andrés Navarro Moreno (15 February 1938 – 18 August 2021) was a Spanish boxer. He competed in the men's welterweight event at the 1960 Summer Olympics.
