= Pete Ranzany =

American boxer

Pete Ranzany (born April 6, 1952 Pete Ronzoni in Sacramento, California) is a former Olympic and professional boxer who performed at the highest level in the 1970s and 80s. As an amateur, he represented the U.S. Army from 1970 to 1973, during which time he defeated future world welterweight champion Carlos Palomino at the 1972 Olympic Trials, but lost to eventual gold medalist Sugar Ray Seales in the finals.

== Boxing Career ==
A conventional boxer with a solid jab and vicious left hook that Ranzany utilized to the body of his opponents, he was known to take opponents out with one single shot to the liver. His trainer, Joey Lopes—also a one-time fighter in the Sacramento region—was often criticized for protecting Ranzany, thus giving Ranzany the label of a "hometown fighter."

Ranzany rose to the rank of number-one challenger in the world in the late 1970s as a welterweight. Ranzany knocked out Randy Shields on February 14, 1978, in the 11th round to earn the NABF welterweight title.

On September 9, 1978, Ranzany fought for the WBA world welterweight title against title holder Jose "Pipino" Cuevas, before a crowd of more than 17,000 people in the outdoor Charles C. Hughes Stadium in Sacramento. After doing well in the first round, Ranzany was knocked out by a right-hand blow from Cuevas in the 2nd round.

One year later, on August 12, 1979, Ranzany lost to Sugar Ray Leonard at Caesars Palace in Las Vegas, getting knocked out in the 4th round. Ranzany came back to Hughes Stadium the following year to defeat Sal Lopez (older brother of future Jr. Lightweight champion, Tony "The Tiger" Lopez) with a 6th-round knockout on September 5, 1980. After this victory, Ranzany got one more shot at a premier welterweight, losing to Wilfred Benítez on December 12, 1980, in a 10-round unanimous decision.

On October 30, 1982, Ranzany defeated former lightweight champion Sean O'Grady in a 10-round unanimous decision.

Achievements
Vacant Title last held by Eddie Perkins	NABF Welterweight Champion; February 24, 1976 - August 12, 1979	Succeeded by Sugar Ray Leonard
