= Des Duguid =

Australian boxer

Personal information
- Nationality: Australian
- Born: 2 September 1941 Richmond, Victoria, Australia
- Died: 16 May 2008 (aged 66) Tewantin, Queensland, Australia

Sport
- Sport: Boxing
Medal record
Boxing
Representing Australia
British Empire (and Commonwealth) Games
Bronze medal – third place	1954 Vancouver	Men's Welter Lightweight

Des Duguid (2 September 1941 – 16 May 2008) was an Australian boxer. He competed in the men's welterweight event at the 1960 Summer Olympics.
