= Clyde Gray =

Canadian boxer

Personal information
- Born: 10 March 1947 (age 79) Canada
- Height: 5 ft 6 1/2 in (1.69 m)
- Weight: welter/light middle/middleweight

Boxing career
- Reach: 67 in (170 cm)

Boxing record
- Total fights: 80
- Wins: 69 (KO 48)
- Losses: 10 (KO 6)
- Draws: 1

Clyde Gray (born March 10, 1947) is a Canadian professional welter/light middle/middleweight boxer of the 1960s, '70s and '80s who won the Canada welterweight title, and Commonwealth welterweight title, and was a challenger for the North American Boxing Federation (NABF) welterweight title against Armando Muñíz, and Pete Ranzany, World Boxing Council (WBC) welterweight title against José Nápoles, and World Boxing Association (WBA) World welterweight title against José Nápoles, Ángel Espada, and José "Pipino" Cuevas, his professional fighting weight varied from 144 lb (65 kg; 10 st 4 lb), i.e. welterweight to 155 1/2 lb (70.5 kg; 11 st 1.5 lb), i.e. middleweight, he was managed by Irving Ungerman, and trained by Teddy McWhorter and Lee Black.

== Napoles-Gray welterweight title fight ==
On September 22, 1973, Clyde Gray challenged undisputed world welterweight champion José Nápoles for the latter's title. The bout took place at Maple Leaf Gardens in Toronto and was televised nationally in both Canada and the United States. Howard Cosell and Muhammad Ali provided commentary. Although Gray, the second-ranked WBC contender, was very competitive throughout the 15 rounds, Nápoles' boxing skill was clearly superior to the challenger's. Nápoles won the bout by a comfortable unanimous decision. In a precedent-setting situation, the scores of the three judges were made known to the television audience (and thus to the two fighters' handlers too) after each round. Therefore, Gray knew he was trailing in the fight and had to be the aggressor in the final rounds if he hoped to win the title. Gray's manager, Irving Ungerman, hoped this open system of judging would become the norm. Howard Cosell echoed that opinion too, but it never came to pass.

== Cuevas-Gray welterweight title fight ==
On August 6, 1977, Gray fought WBA world welterweight champion José (Pipino) Cuevas at the Olympic Auditorium in Los Angeles. By 1977, Gray was on the downward side of his professional career, but he accorded himself well in the first round versus the heavy-punching Cuevas. However, Cuevas began to dominate the fight early in the second round and scored a series of solid blows. Gray was floored with a left hand blow that appeared to be not particularly hard. Gray fell forward and was surprisingly counted out by referee Chuck Hassett at the 1:28 mark of the round. Gray was paid $12,500 for the bout. Cuevas was quoted in a Reuters news story as saying, "It was an easier fight than I expected. I thought it would go on a bit longer."

== Genealogical information ==
Clyde Gray is the younger brother of the boxer, Stewart Gray (birth unknown — 22 February 1972).
