= Yuri Radonyak =

Russian boxer (1935–2013)

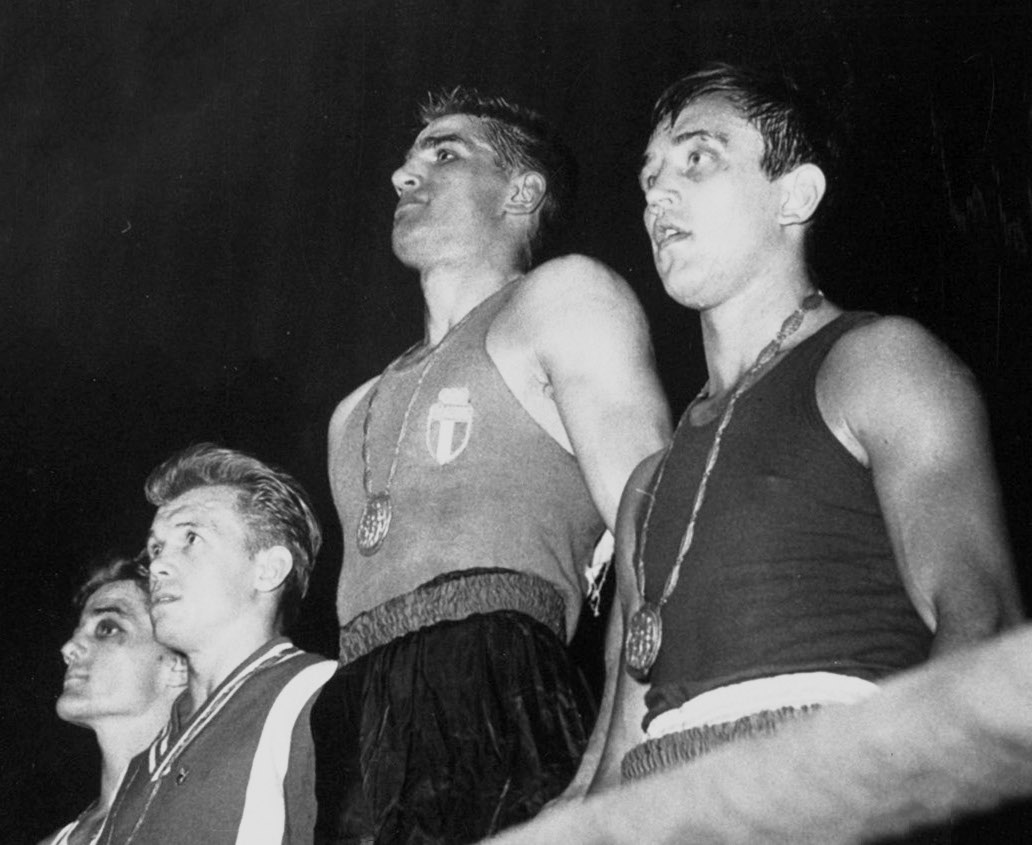
- Radonyak (right) at the 1960 Olympics

Personal information
- Born: 8 October 1935 Grozny, Russian SFSR, Soviet Union
- Died: 28 March 2013 (aged 77) Krasnodar Krai, Russia
- Height: 167 cm (5 ft 6 in)

Sport
- Sport: Boxing
- Club: CSKA Moscow
Medal record
Representing the Soviet Union
Olympic Games
Silver medal – second place	1960 Rome	Welterweight

Yuri Radonyak (8 October 1935 – 28 March 2013) was a Russian welterweight boxer who competed for the Soviet Army club. In 1958 he placed second at the Soviet championships and won the World Army Championships. Two years later he won the Soviet title and a silver medal at the 1960 Olympics. He retired in 1962 with a record of 197 wins out of 226 bouts and later had a long career as a boxing coach. In 1962–73 he worked at the Soviet Army club in Moscow and in 1972–76 coached the Soviet national team. The 1972 Olympic gold medalist Vyacheslav Lemeshev was his personal trainee.
