= Omrane Sadok =

Tunisian boxer (1937–2021)

Personal information
- Born: 15 October 1937 Tunis, Tunisia, France
- Died: 16 August 2021 (aged 83)
- Height: 160 cm (5 ft 3 in)
- Weight: 67 kg (148 lb)

Sport
- Country: Tunisia
- Sport: Boxing

Achievements and titles
- Olympic finals: 1960

Omrane Sadok (Arabic: عمران صادق; 15 October 1937 – 16 August 2021) was a Tunisian boxer. He competed in the boxing events at the 1960 Summer Olympics.

At the 1959 Mediterranean Games, Omrane won a gold medal in the welterweight –67 kg event.
