= List of British super-lightweight boxing champions =

List of British super-lightweight boxing champions is a table showing the boxers who have won the British super-lightweight title, which has been the British Boxing Board of Control (BBBoC) since 1978.

A champion will often voluntarily relinquish the title in order to fight for a higher-ranked championship, such as the world or European. Where the date on which a champion relinquished the title is unclear, the date of the last BBBoC sanctioned fight is shown.

^{r}–Champion relinquished title.

^{s}–Champion stripped of title.

Name	Duration of reign	Defences
Des Rea	27 February 1968 – 17 February 1969	1
Vic Andreetti	17 February 1969 – 13 October 1969^{r}	1
Des Morrison	27 November 1973 – 26 March 1974	1
Pat McCormack	26 March 1974 – 21 November 1974	1
Joey Singleton	21 November 1974 – 1 June 1976	3
Dave Boy Green	1 June 1976^{r}	0
Colin Powers	19 October 1977 – 27 February 1978^{r}	1
Clinton McKenzie	11 October 1978 – 6 February 1979	1
Colin Powers	6 February 1979 – 11 September 1979	1
Clinton McKenzie	11 September 1979 – 19 September 1984	5
Terry Marsh	19 September 1984^{r}	0
Tony Laing	7 May 1986^{r}	0
Tony McKenzie	20 September 1986 – 28 January 1987	2
Lloyd Christie	28 January 1987 – 24 January 1989	3
Clinton McKenzie	24 January 1989^{r}	0
Pat Barrett	24 October 1989^{r}	0
Tony Ekubia	26 September 1990 – 20 June 1991	1
Andy Holligan	20 June 1991 – 25 May 1994	3
Ross Hale	25 May 1994 – 9 December 1995	4
Paul Ryan	9 December 1995 – 13 July 1996	1
Andy Holligan	13 July 1996^{r}	0
Mark Winters	11 October 1997 – 16 May 1998	2
Jason Rowland	16 May 1998 – 15 November 1999^{r (2000)}	1
Ricky Hatton	21 October 2000^{r}	0
Junior Witter	16 March 2002 – 21 October 2005^{r}	1
Lenny Daws	12 May 2006 – 20 January 2007	1
Barry Morrison	20 January 2007 – 8 June 2007	1
Colin Lynes	8 June 2007 – 20 July 2007^{r}	1
David Barnes	14 March 2008 - 4 July 2008^{r}	1
Paul McCloskey	5 December 2008 - 13 March 2009^{r}	1
Olusegun Ajose	12 June 2009^{r}	0
Lenny Daws	18 September 2009 - 19 February 2011	3
Ashley Theophane	19 February 2011 - 19 May 2012	3
Darren Hamilton	19 May 2012 - 22 February 2014	3
Curtis Woodhouse	22 February 2014 - 27 June 2014	1
Willie Limond	27 June 2014^{r}	0
Tyrone Nurse	21 November 2015 – 21 October 2017	3
Jack Catterall	21 October 2017^{r}	0
Robbie Davies Jr	13 October 2018 – 30 March 2019^{r}	1
Akeem Ennis-Brown	2 September 2020 – 28 August 2021	0
Sam Maxwell	28 August 2021^{r}	0
Dalton Smith	6 August 2022^{r}	3
Jack Rafferty	5 October 2024	2

== See also ==
- List of British heavyweight boxing champions
- List of British cruiserweight boxing champions
- List of British light-heavyweight boxing champions
- List of British super-middleweight boxing champions
- List of British middleweight boxing champions
- List of British light-middleweight boxing champions
- List of British welterweight boxing champions
- List of British lightweight boxing champions
- List of British super-featherweight boxing champions
- List of British featherweight boxing champions
- List of British super-bantamweight boxing champions
- List of British bantamweight boxing champions
- List of British super-flyweight boxing champions
- List of British flyweight boxing champions
- List of British world boxing champions
