= Jørgen Hansen (boxer) =

Danish boxer (1943–2018)

Jørgen Gamle Hansen
Personal information
- Nickname: Gamle (The old one)
- Nationality: Danish
- Born: Jørgen Hansen; 27 March 1943 Aarhus, Denmark
- Died: 15 March 2018 (aged 74)
- Weight: Welterweight

Boxing career

Boxing record
- Total fights: 92
- Wins: 78
- Win by KO: 34
- Losses: 14
- Draws: 0

Jørgen Hansen (27 March 1943 – 15 March 2018) was a Danish welterweight boxer.

Hansen competed for Denmark at the 1968 Summer Olympics in the welterweight division but lost his first match. Hansen turned professional shortly after the games and was active as a professional until 1982.

Hansen fought for the WBC world light welterweight title in 1973, but was stopped by Italian Bruno Arcari.

Hansen won the European welterweight title in 1977 against Italian Marco Scano but lost the title by disqualification in his first defense. In 1978 he was awarded a chance to regain the title against Frenchman Alain Marion whom Hansen stopped in the 6th round of the title bout. Hansen later lost the title by disqualification. Hansen won the European title for the third time when he knocked out British European champion Dave Boy Green in the third round. He defended the title successfully six times before giving up the title at the end of 1981. His fought his last fight in December 1982 winning a decision against former world champion Perico Fernandez.

Hansen retired in 1982 with a professional record of 78-14-0 (34 KO's).

The 2017 Danish film, Den Bedste Mand, (Pound for Pound) is based on Hansen's and friend Ayub Kalule's lives.

== Professional boxing record ==
92 fights	78 wins	14 losses
By knockout	35	10
By decision	38	1
By disqualification	5	3

No.	Result	Record	Opponent	Type	Round, Time	Date	Location	Notes
92	Win	78–14	(Spain) Perico Fernández	PTS	8	2 Dec 1982	Randers Hallen, Randers, Denmark	
91	Win	77–14	(France) Andre Holyk	TKO	5 (8)	7 Oct 1982	K.B. Hallen, Copenhagen, Denmark	
90	Win	76–14	(United States) Don Morgan	PTS	8	30 Apr 1982	Brøndby Hallen, Brøndby, Denmark	
89	Win	75–14	(Tunisia) Bechir Boundka	DQ	7 (8)	10 Dec 1981	Idrætshuset, Copenhagen, Denmark	
88	Win	74–14	(United States) Randy Milton	PTS	8	13 Nov 1981	Randers Hallen, Randers, Denmark	
87	Win	73–14	(Denmark) Hans Henrik Palm	SD	12	9 Oct 1981	K.B. Hallen, Copenhagen, Denmark	Retained EBU welterweight title
86	Loss	72–14	(Mexico) José Pipino Cuevas	TKO	1 (10), 1:20	25 Jun 1981	(United States) Astrodome, Houston, Texas, U.S.	
85	Win	72–13	(France) Richard Rodriguez	UD	12	21 May 1981	Idrætshuset, Copenhagen, Denmark	Retained EBU welterweight title
84	Win	71–13	(United States) Papo Villa	PTS	8	5 Mar 1981	Brøndby Hallen, Brøndby, Denmark	
83	Win	70–13	(Italy) Giuseppe Di Padova	PTS	12	4 Dec 1980	Randers Hallen, Randers, Denmark	Retained EBU welterweight title
82	Win	69–13	(Denmark) Hans Henrik Palm	TKO	9 (12)	17 Oct 1980	Brøndby Hallen, Brøndby, Denmark	Retained EBU welterweight title
81	Win	68–13	(Jamaica) Horace KcKenzie	DQ	7 (8)	6 Sep 1980	Aarhus Stadion, Aarhus, Denmark	
80	Win	67–13	(Austria) Esperno Postl	TKO	7 (12)	12 Jun 1980	Randers Hallen, Randers, Denmark	
79	Win	66–13	(England) Joey Singleton	UD	12	17 Apr 1980	Brøndby Hallen, Brøndby, Denmark	Retained EBU welterweight title
78	Win	65–13	(Venezuela) Jose Ramirez	KO	7 (8)	29 Feb 1980	Odense Idrætshal, Odense, Denmark	
77	Win	64–13	(Belgium) Alois Carmeliet	TKO	5 (15)	7 Feb 1980	Randers Hallen, Randers, Denmark	Retained EBU welterweight title
76	Win	63–13	(Austria) Joseph Pachler	TKO	7 (10)	6 Dec 1979	Brøndby Hallen, Brøndby, Denmark	
75	Win	62–13	(Italy) Remo Costa	PTS	8	11 Oct 1979	Brøndby Hallen, Brøndby, Denmark	
74	Win	61–13	(Union of South Africa) Gert Steyn	UD	8	6 Sep 1979	Randers Hallen, Randers, Denmark	
73	Win	60–13	(England) Dave Boy Green	KO	3 (12)	28 Jun 1979	Randers Hallen, Randers, Denmark	Won EBU welterweight title
72	Win	59–13	(Wales) Billy Waith	PTS	8	15 Feb 1979	Randers Hallen, Randers, Denmark	
71	Win	58–13	(Italy) Vittorio Conte	TKO	5 (8)	7 Dec 1978	Idrætshuset, Copenhagen, Denmark	Injury
70	Win	57–13	(United States) Johnny Copeland	TKO	7 (8)	9 Nov 1978	Brøndby Hallen, Brøndby, Denmark	
69	Win	56–13	(Trinidad and Tobago) Eddie Marcelle	PTS	8	14 Sep 1978	Randers Hallen, Randers, Denmark	
68	Loss	55–13	(Austria) Joseph Pachler	DQ	8 (15)	28 Aug 1978	Villach, Austria	Lost EBU welterweight title
67	Win	55–12	(Italy) Giancarlo Barabotti	KO	6 (8)	25 May 1978	Brøndby Hallen, Brøndby, Denmark	
66	Win	54–12	(France) Alain Marion	KO	6 (15)	27 Apr 1978	Randers Hallen, Randers, Denmark	Won EBU welterweight title
65	Loss	53–12	(United States) Mike Everett	KO	1 (10)	9 Feb 1978	Idrætshuset, Copenhagen, Denmark	
64	Win	53–11	(Uruguay) Eduardo Batista	TKO	2 (8)	5 Jan 1978	Randers Hallen, Randers, Denmark	
63	Win	52–11	(Italy) Paolo Zanusso	DQ	6 (8)	8 Dec 1977	Idrætshuset, Copenhagen, Denmark	
62	Win	51–11	(England) Stave Angell	KO	6 (8)	3 Nov 1977	Randers Hallen, Randers, Denmark	
61	Win	50–11	(France) Rene Deharchies	KO	2 (8)	6 Oct 1977	Idrætshuset, Copenhagen, Denmark	
60	Win	49–11	(England) Tony Hudson	PTS	8	8 Sep 1977	Idrætshuset, Copenhagen, Denmark	
59	Loss	48–11	(Germany) Joerg Eipel	DQ	13 (15)	6 Aug 1977	Deutschlandhalle, Charlottenburg, Germany	Lost EBU welterweight title
58	Win	48–10	(Italy) Marco Scano	KO	5 (15)	2 Jun 1977	Randers Hallen, Randers, Denmark	Won EBU welterweight title
57	Win	47–10	(Italy) Nicola Sassanelli	TKO	4 (8)	28 Apr 1977	Idrætshuset, Copenhagen, Denmark	
56	Win	46–10	(Portugal) Carlos Almeida	KO	1 (8)	31 Mar 1977	Idrætshuset, Copenhagen, Denmark	
55	Win	45–10	(Turkey) Mehmet Cakal	PTS	8	24 Feb 1977	Idrætshuset, Copenhagen, Denmark	
54	Loss	44–10	(Curaçao) Frank Albertus	TKO	3 (8)	20 Jan 1977	Idrætshuset, Copenhagen, Denmark	
53	Win	44–9	(Italy) Augusto Lauri	PTS	8	9 Dec 1976	Idrætshuset, Copenhagen, Denmark	
52	Win	43–9	(Italy) Luciano De Luca	KO	6 (8)	19 Nov 1976	Randers Hallen, Randers, Denmark	
51	Win	42–9	(Ghana) Tiger Quaye	KO	1 (8)	9 Oct 1976	Forum, Copenhagen, Denmark	
50	Win	41–9	(Saint Kitts and Nevis) Pat Thomas	TKO	3 (8)	3 Jun 1976	Idrætshuset, Copenhagen, Denmark	
49	Win	40–9	(Wales) Billy Waith	PTS	8	8 Apr 1976	Forum, Copenhagen, Denmark	
48	Loss	39–9	(Brazil) Everaldo Costa Azevedo	TKO	6 (8)	22 Nov 1975	(North Macedonia) Skopje, Macedonia	
47	Loss	39–8	(Australia) Rocky Mattioli	TKO	7 (10), 2:05	24 Oct 1975	PalaLido, Milan, Italy	
46	Win	39–7	(Norway) Kristian Hoydahl	TKO	7 (12)	19 Jun 1975	Jordal Amfi, Oslo, Norway	Won Scandinavian welterweight title
45	Win	38–7	(United States) Jimmy Carter	KO	3 (8)	6 May 1975	Holstebro Hallen, Holstebro, Denmark	
44	Loss	37–7	(Italy) Marco Scano	DQ	3 (8)	8 Mar 1975	Cagliari, Sardegna, Italy	
43	Win	37–6	(Germany) Horst Brinkmeier	TKO	4 (10)	1 Mar 1975	Cologne, Nordrhein-Westfalen, Germany	
42	Win	36–6	(Germany) Jurgen Voss	PTS	8	15 Feb 1975	Randers Hallen, Randers, Denmark	
41	Win	35–6	(Slovakia) Jaroslav Travnik	PTS	6	10 Dec 1974	Offenbach, Hesse, Germany	
40	Win	34–6	(Italy) Bruno Freschi	TKO	6 (8)	21 Nov 1974	K.B. Hallen, Copenhagen, Denmark	
39	Win	33–6	(Republic of Ireland) Jim Montague	PTS	8	10 Oct 1974	K.B. Hallen, Copenhagen, Denmark	
38	Loss	32–6	(Union of South Africa) Norman Sekgapane	KO	9 (10)	17 Aug 1974	(Union of South Africa) Rand Stadium, Johannesburg, South Africa	
37	Win	32–5	(England) Mickey Flynn	DQ	4 (8)	4 Apr 1974	K.B. Hallen, Copenhagen, Denmark	
36	Win	31–5	(Germany) Kurt Hombach	TKO	6 (8)	14 Mar 1974	Randers Hallen, Randers, Denmark	
35	Win	30–5	(Jamaica) Des Morrison	PTS	8	7 Feb 1974	K.B. Hallen, Copenhagen, Denmark	
34	Win	29–5	(Italy) Pietro Ceru	PTS	8	17 Jan 1974	Randers Hallen, Randers, Denmark	
33	Loss	28–5	(Italy) Bruno Arcari	KO	5 (15)	1 Nov 1973	K.B. Hallen, Copenhagen, Denmark	For WBC light welterweight title
32	Win	28–4	(Brazil) Everaldo Costa Azevedo	PTS	12	6 Sep 1973	Brøndby Hallen, Brøndby, Denmark	
31	Win	27–4	(Ghana) Eddie Blay	PTS	8	14 Jun 1973	K.B. Hallen, Copenhagen, Denmark	
30	Loss	26–4	(Brazil) Everaldo Costa Azevedo	SD	8	10 May 1973	Brøndby Hallen, Brøndby Denmark	
29	Win	26–3	(Republic of Ireland) Pat McCormack	DQ	7 (10)	8 Mar 1973	K.B. Hallen, Copenhagen, Denmark	
28	Win	25–3	(Brazil) Adrian Rodrigues	PTS	8	1 Mar 1973	Nordstrandhallen, Oslo, Norway	
27	Loss	24–3	(Republic of Ireland) Pat McCormack	TKO	4 (8)	18 Jan 1973	K.B. Hallen, Copenhagen, Denmark	
26	Win	24–2	(Republic of Ireland) Pat McCormack	TKO	5 (8)	7 Dec 1972	K.B. Hallen, Copenhagen, Denmark	
25	Loss	23–2	(Ghana) Eddie Blay	TKO	8 (8)	19 Nov 1972	Vejlby-Risskov Hallen, Aarhus, Denmark	Injury
24	Win	23–1	(United States) John White	PTS	8	19 Aug 1972	Idrætsparken, Copenhagen, Denmark	
23	Loss	22–1	(France) Roger Menetrey	KO	10 (15)	22 Jun 1972	Forum, Copenhagen, Denmark	For EBU (European) welterweight title
22	Win	22–0	(Germany) Rainer Mueller	PTS	8	13 Apr 1972	K.B. Hallen, Copenhagen, Denmark	
21	Win	21–0	(England) Ricky Porter	PTS	10	2 Mar 1972	K.B. Hallen, Copenhagen, Denmark	
20	Win	20–0	(Argentina) Francisco Martin Figueroa	KO	6 (8)	27 Jan 1972	K.B. Hallen, Copenhagen, Denmark	
19	Win	19–0	(United States) Dave Wyatt	KO	2 (8)	21 Nov 1971	Nykøbing Falster Hallen, Nykøbing Falster, Denmark	
18	Win	18–0	(France) Yvon Mariolle	PTS	8	21 Oct 1971	K.B. Hallen, Copenhagen, Denmark	
17	Win	17–0	(Spain) Jose Gonzalez Dopico	TKO	5 (8)	16 Sep 1971	K.B. Hallen, Copenhagen, Denmark	
16	Win	16–0	(England) Johnny Cooke	PTS	8	2 Sep 1971	Vejlby-Risskov Hallen, Aarhus, Denmark	
15	Win	15–0	(Republic of Ireland) Des Rea	PTS	8	1 Jul 1971	K.B. Hallen, Copenhagen, Denmark	
14	Win	14–0	(Italy) Romualdo D'Alo	PTS	8	22 Apr 1971	K.B. Hallen, Copenhagen, Denmark	
13	Win	13–0	(England) Bernie Terrell	KO	5 (8)	11 Feb 1971	K.B. Hallen, Copenhagen, Denmark	
12	Win	12–0	(France) Guy Vercoutter	PTS	8	24 Jan 1971	Holstebro Hallen, Holstebro, Denmark	
11	Win	11–0	(Italy) Aldo Mondora	TKO	6 (10)	4 Dec 1970	PalaEur, Roma, Italy	
10	Win	10–0	(Republic of Ireland) Gus Farrell	KO	7 (8)	8 Oct 1970	K.B. Hallen, Copenhagen, Denmark	
9	Win	9–0	(England) Roy Errol Francis	PTS	6	27 Aug 1970	Valby Idrætspark, Valby, Denmark	
8	Win	8–0	(England) Barry Calderwood	PTS	6	4 Jun 1970	Valby Idrætspark, Valby, Denmark	
7	Win	7–0	(England) Bobby Arthur	PTS	6	2 Apr 1970	Vejlby-Risskov Hallen, Aarhus, Denmark	
6	Win	6–0	(France) Mohammed Taif	KO	2 (6)	12 Feb 1970	Skotjehal, Gladsaxe, Denmark	
5	Win	5–0	(Italy) Giovanni Murgia	PTS	6	7 Dec 1969	Vejlby-Risskov Hallen, Aarhus, Denmark	
4	Win	4–0	(France) Gerard Hedin	PTS	6	6 Nov 1969	K.B. Hallen, Copenhagen, Denmark	
3	Win	3–0	(Algeria) Lakdar Boulaiche	KO	3 (6)	11 Sep 1969	Idrætsparken, Copenhagen, Denmark	
2	Win	2–0	(France) Arezki Galou	KO	4 (4)	5 Jun 1969	K.B. Hallen, Copenhagen, Denmark	
1	Win	1–0	(France) Daniel Vedani	PTS	4	10 Apr 1969	K.B. Hallen, Copenhagen, Denmark	
