= Sugar Ray Leonard vs. Roberto Durán =

1980 boxing match

The Brawl in Montreal
- Date: June 20, 1980
- Venue: Olympic Stadium, Montreal, Quebec, Canada
- Title(s) on the line: WBC and The Ring welterweight titles

Tale of the tape
Boxer	Ray Leonard	Roberto Durán
Nickname	Sugar	Manos de Piedra ("Hands of Stone")
Hometown	Palmer Park, Maryland, U.S.	Panama City, Panama Province, Panama
Purse	$9,000,000	$1,500,000
Pre-fight record	27–0 (18 KO)	71–1 (56 KO)
Age	24 years, 1 month	29 years
Height	5 ft 10 in (178 cm)	5 ft 7 in (170 cm)
Weight	145 lb (66 kg)	145 lb (66 kg)
Style	Orthodox	Orthodox
Recognition	WBC and The Ring; Welterweight Champion	WBC; No. 1 Ranked Welterweight; Former undisputed lightweight champion

Result
- Durán wins via 15-round unanimous decision (146-144, 148-147, 145-144)

Sugar Ray Leonard vs. Roberto Durán, billed as The Brawl in Montreal, was a professional boxing match contested on June 20, 1980 for the WBC and The Ring welterweight championship. The bout took place at the Olympic Stadium in Montreal, Canada. The referee was Carlos Padilla Jr.

== Background ==
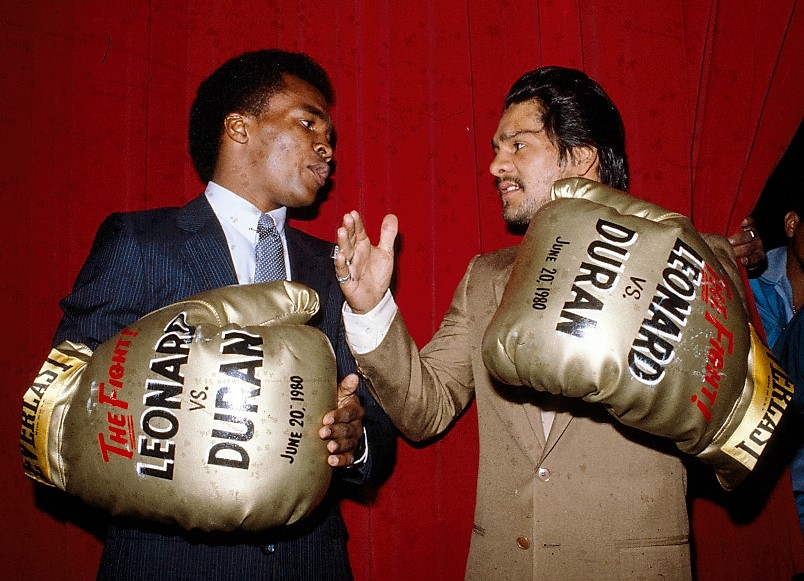
Leonard, Duran posing with oversized boxing gloves before June 20, 1980 fight

On May 9, 1980, the highly anticipated fight between the undefeated reigning WBC champion "Sugar" Ray Leonard and former undisputed lightweight champion and the-then number-one ranked welterweight contender Roberto Durán was announced. The bout, which was to take place a little over a month after its official announcement on June 20, took place at Montreal's Olympic Stadium, the site where Leonard had captured the Olympic gold medal four years prior. Going into the fight, both Leonard and Durán were two of the top fighters in the sport, Leonard was perfect 27–0 and had captured the WBC welterweight title the previous December after knocking out future hall-of-famer Wilfred Benítez and then made a successful first defense against Dave Boy Green in March 1980. Durán had recently completed a six-year run as lightweight champion before moving up to welterweight where he compiled an 8–0 record before facing Leonard. The fight was set to be the highest grossing in boxing history and both Leonard and Durán were to make the biggest paydays in their careers at $9 million and $1.5 million respectively. Leonard was a 9 to 5 favorite.

Just prior to the bout, both Leonard and Durán received health scares. Durán underwent a two-hour heart exam and after his EKG revealed an abnormality in his heartbeat, a cardiologist was called in and determined that the abnormality was common in a well-trained athlete and Durán was cleared to fight. Leonard, meanwhile, claimed that he had been stricken by a "virus", though his trainer stated "If he had a virus, it wasn't that bad or I would have heard of it."

== The fight ==
In a hard-fought, back-and-forth contest that went the full 15 rounds, Durán was the aggressor often throughout the fight, and he was able to earn a close unanimous decision victory. Durán both landed and threw more punches for a 35% success rate, while Leonard, who abandoned his usual slick boxing style and went toe-to-toe with Durán, landed 273 of 753 for a 36% rate. Whilst Leonard made adjustments late in the fight, Durán had built a large enough lead by that point in the fight.

When the decision was announced, Durán was incorrectly announced as a winner by majority decision as one judge's scorecard was erroneously tabulated as a 147–147 draw, however the mistake was discovered and Durán won on all three scorecards with scores of; 145–144, 148–147 and 146–144.

== Aftermath ==
Speaking after the bout Duran said "He is the best I have fought. He hit me hard a couple of times, but I was never in bad shape. He was pretty good, but he had to be because he was fighting me."

== Fight card ==
Confirmed bouts:

Weight Class	Weight		vs.		Method	Round	Notes
Welterweight	147 lbs.	Roberto Durán	def.	Ray Leonard (c)	UD	15/15	^{Note 1}
Light middleweight	154 lbs.	Roger Leonard	def.	Clyde Gray	SD	10/10
Heavyweight	200+ lbs.	Trevor Berbick	def.	John Tate	KO	9/10
Middleweight	160 lbs.	Fernand Marcotte	vs.	Eddie Melo	D	10/10
Lightweight	135 lbs.	Gaétan Hart	def.	Cleveland Denny	TKO	10/10

^Note 1 For WBC, The Ring and lineal Welterweight titles

== Broadcasting ==
Country	Broadcaster
Mexico	Televisa
Philippines	MBS 4
United Kingdom	ITV
United States	ABC

== See also ==
- Roberto Durán vs. Sugar Ray Leonard II
- Sugar Ray Leonard vs. Roberto Durán III

Preceded by vs. Dave Boy Green	Sugar Ray Leonard's bouts 20 June 1980	Succeeded by Rematch
Preceded by vs. Wellington Wheatley	Roberto Durán's bouts 20 June 1980	Succeeded by Rematch
