= Pat Thomas (boxer) =

Saint Kitts and Nevis boxer

Personal information
- Nationality: Saint Kitts and Nevis; United Kingdom
- Born: 5 May 1950 (age 76) Saint Kitts
- Weight: Light-middleweight; Welterweight

Boxing career
- Stance: Orthodox

Boxing record
- Total fights: 57
- Wins: 35
- Win by KO: 14
- Losses: 18
- Draws: 3
- No contests: 1

Pat Thomas (born 5 May 1950) was a Light-middleweight boxer, originally from Saint Kitts and Nevis, who took British citizenship and won two British boxing titles in the 1970s and 80s. After leaving Saint Kitts, Thomas settled in Cardiff in Wales, and is recognised as a Welsh fighter taking the Welsh light middleweight Championship in 1977.

== Boxing career ==
Thomas' first professional bout was at welterweight, fought in Manchester against Ray Farell, himself a fairly novice boxer with only two professional matches to his name. Thomas won by knockout in the second round, and this started a nine match unbeaten run, though none of his seven wins after Farell coming through knockout. His first defeat was a points decision to Alan Reid at the end of 1971, a fighter who he had faced and beaten six months earlier.

Thomas' next bout was in 1972, against Jimmy Fairweather in Walworth, saw Thomas now fighting in eight-round matches. A win over Fairweather was followed by victories over Mickey Flynn and Phil Dykes, before being disqualified in an encounter with Charlie Cooper. At the start of 1973, he beat Des Rea, the Irish Welterweight Champion by a points decision; this was followed by two more wins before he faced Rea again, this time beating him by technical knockout in the fourth round. 1973 ended just like the previous two years, with a defeat, a narrow points loss to Trevor Francis at Sophia Gardens in Cardiff. The next year saw Thomas begin one of the most successful periods of his career, going on a twelve match unbeaten run. On 15 December 1975, Thomas faced Pat MacCormack for the vacant British Welterweight title. He knocked MacCormack down twice, before winning by knockout in the thirteenth and in the process became the first immigrant fighter to win the British Welterweight title.

After a win over Jim Devanny in February 1976, Thomas fought Italian Marco Scano in Cagliari, for the vacant European Welterweight title. Thomas was outclassed losing by knockout in the second round. This was followed by Thomas' second overseas match, facing Jørgen Hansen in Denmark; Thomas lost by technical knockout in the third. Back in Britain, Thomas successfully defended his welterweight title against Trevor Francis, but then lost the belt when he was knocked out by Henry Rhiney in Luton.

After losing the welterweight title, Thomas went up a weight division, now fighting at light-middleweight. He began in the new division by taking the Welsh Light-middleweight title from Dave Davies, who had beaten Thomas three times in the amateurs, in early 1977. Despite the encounter being for a Welsh title, the match took place at The Stadium in Liverpool, the fight being part of the undercard for John Conteh's WBC World Championship bout with Len Hutchins. Thomas' light-middleweight career was far more chequered than his time as a welterweight, losing to Larry Paul, before beating Rhiney and then drawing with Tony Sibson. In 1978 Thomas spent much of his time fighting outside Britain, but with little success. He fought twice in Netherlands, a win and a loss, which were followed by three straight losses, against former Olympic Lightweight Champion Chris Clarke in Canada, then French Champion Claude Martin and finally Spanish fighter Andoni Amana in Bilbao.

His fortunes changed on British soil, with wins over Salvo Nucifero and Robbie Davies, before losing to Kenny Bristol in a fight for the vacant British Empire Light-middleweight title by a unanimous points decision. The very next fight was another title decider, this time for the British Light-middleweight belt on 11 September 1979. In that encounter he beat Jimmy Batten in the ninth round to take his second British title; though Batten later stated that he felt he had given the title away as he wasn't in the correct frame of mind due to personal problems. Thomas defended his title successfully twice, knocking out Dave Proud in the seventh and then stopping Steve Hopkin in the final round with a badly cut eye. His third defence ended in defeat, losing to Hensol Graham by points. This was the start of a six-round losing streak that only ended with his retirement from boxing in 1984.

== Professional boxing record ==
35 Wins (14 knockouts, 21 decisions), 18 Losses (4 knockouts, 14 decisions), 3 Draws, 1 No Contest
Result	Record	Opponent	Type	Round	Date	Location	Notes
Loss	7-0	(United Kingdom) Chris Pyatt	PTS	10	15 Mar 1984	(England) Granby Halls, Leicester, Leicestershire, United Kingdom	
Loss	11-0	(United Kingdom) Graeme Ahmed	PTS	10	31 Aug 1982	(Tyne and Wear) Buddy's Night Club, South Shields, United Kingdom	98-98.5.
Loss	13-3-3	(United Kingdom) Brian Anderson	PTS	10	21 May 1982	(England) Crucible Theatre, Sheffield, United Kingdom	96.5-100.
Loss	7-2-1	(Wales) Darwin Brewster	PTS	10	26 Apr 1982	STAR Centre, Cardiff, Wales, United Kingdom	96.5-99.5.
Loss	33-0	(Mauritania) Nino La Rocca	TKO	4	13 Nov 1981	Rome, Italy	
Loss	16-0	(United Kingdom) Herol Graham	PTS	15	24 Mar 1981	(Yorkshire) Sheffield City Hall, Sheffield, United Kingdom	BBBofC British Light Middleweight Title. 143-150.
Win	14-1-2	(United Kingdom) Steve Hopkin	TKO	15	16 Sep 1980	(England) Wembley Conference Centre, Wembley, London, United Kingdom	BBBofC British Light Middleweight Title. Referee stopped the bout at 2:25 of the 15th round.
Win	9-6	(Netherlands Antilles) "Fighting" Jim Richards	PTS	8	3 Jun 1980	(England) Royal Albert Hall, Kensington, London, United Kingdom	80-76.5.
Win	28-3-1	(United Kingdom) Dave Proud	KO	7	11 Dec 1979	(Buckinghamshire) Bletchley Leisure Centre, Milton Keynes, United Kingdom	BBBofC British Light Middleweight Title.
Win	28-3	(United Kingdom) Jimmy Batten	TKO	9	11 Sep 1979	(England) Wembley Conference Centre, Wembley, London, United Kingdom	BBBofC British Light Middleweight Title. Referee stopped the bout at 1:15 of the ninth round.
Loss	9-0	(Guyana) Kenny Bristol	UD	15	29 Jul 1979	National Sports Hall, Georgetown, Guyana	Commonwealth Light Middleweight Title.
Win	9-1	(United Kingdom) Robbie Davies	PTS	12	5 Apr 1979	(England) Liverpool Stadium, Liverpool, Merseyside, United Kingdom	BBBofC British Light Middleweight Title Eliminator. 118-117.
Win	9-3	(United Kingdom) Salvo Nucifero	TKO	1	27 Nov 1978	Civic Sports Centre, Kettering, Northamptonshire, United Kingdom	
Loss	17-0	(Spain) Andoni Amana	PTS	10	5 Oct 1978	Bilbao, Spain	
Loss	25-3-1	(France) Claude "General" Martin	PTS	10	23 Sep 1978	Saint-Malo, France	BBBofC British Light Middleweight Title. Referee stopped the bout at 2:25 of the 15th round.
Loss	13-0	(Canada) Chris Clarke	UD	8	1 Aug 1978	Halifax Metro Centre, Halifax, Nova Scotia, Canada	
Win	4-0	(Turkey) Agamil Yilderim	PTS	8	29 May 1978	Rotterdam Ahoy Sportpaleis, Rotterdam, Netherlands	
Loss	8-0	(Socialist Federal Republic of Yugoslavia) Marijan Benes	PTS	8	16 Jan 1978	Rotterdam, Netherlands	
Draw	17-0	(United Kingdom) Tony Sibson	PTS	8	18 Oct 1977	(England) Wolverhampton Civic Hall, Wolverhampton, United Kingdom	
Win	25-10-6	(Jamaica) Henry Rhiney	PTS	8	14 Jun 1977	(England) Empire Pool, Wembley, London, United Kingdom	
Loss	28-6-1	(United Kingdom) Larry Paul	DQ	5	27 May 1977	(England) Digbeth Institute, Birmingham, West Midlands, United Kingdom	BBBofC British Light Middleweight Title Eliminator.
Win	6-6-2	(Wales) "Boxing" Dave Davies	TKO	8	5 Mar 1977	(England) Liverpool Stadium, Liverpool, Merseyside, United Kingdom	BBBofC Welsh Light Middleweight Title.
Loss	22-9-6	(Jamaica) Henry Rhiney	TKO	8	7 Dec 1976	(Bedfordshire) Luton Caesar's Palace, Luton, United Kingdom	BBBofC British Welterweight Title.
Win	20-8-6	(United Kingdom) "Boxing" Trevor Francis	PTS	15	22 Sep 1976	(England) Hilton Hotel, Mayfair, London, United Kingdom	BBBofC British Welterweight Title. 147.5-147.
Loss	40-9	(Denmark) Jørgen Hansen	TKO	3	3 Jun 1976	K.B. Hallen, Copenhagen, Denmark	
Loss	33-3-2	(Italy) Marco Scano	KO	2	9 Apr 1976	Palazzo Dello Sport, Cagliari, Italy	EBU Welterweight Title.
Win	16-8-5	(United Kingdom) Jim Devanney	TKO	8	16 Feb 1976	(England) Arden Sporting Club, Birmingham, West Midlands, United Kingdom	
Win	30-17-1	(Republic of Ireland) Pat McCormack	KO	13	15 Dec 1975	(England) Manor Place Baths, Walworth, London, United Kingdom	BBBofC British Welterweight Title.
Win	7-3-1	(Germany) Peter Scheibner	PTS	8	8 Jul 1975	(Wales) Double Diamond Club, Caerphilly, United Kingdom	79.5-76.5.
Win	7-1	(United Kingdom) Jeff Gale	TKO	11	2 Jun 1975	(England) National Sporting Club, Piccadilly, London, United Kingdom	BBBofC British Welterweight Title Eliminator.
Win	9-9	(United Kingdom) Jim Montague	KO	5	28 Apr 1975	(Scotland) Albany Hotel, Glasgow, United Kingdom	
Win	13-4-2	(Jamaica) Henry Rhiney	PTS	8	4 Dec 1974	(England) National Sporting Club, Piccadilly, London, United Kingdom	
Draw	10-4-2	(Wales) Kenny Webber	PTS	10	25 Sep 1974	(England) Midland Sporting Club, Solihull, West Midlands, United Kingdom	
Win	11-3-1	(Jamaica) Henry Rhiney	PTS	8	25 Jun 1974	(England) National Sporting Club, Piccadilly, London, United Kingdom	
Win	21-15-1	(United Kingdom) Mickey Flynn	PTS	8	22 Apr 1974	(England) National Sporting Club, Piccadilly, London, United Kingdom	
Win	15-14-1	(Scotland) "Scottish" John Smith	PTS	8	18 Mar 1974	(England) National Sporting Club, Piccadilly, London, United Kingdom	
Win	29-33-5	(United Kingdom) Des Rea	TKO	4	27 Feb 1974	Sophia Gardens, Cardiff, Wales, United Kingdom	
Win	16-9-5	(United Kingdom) Les Pearson	KO	1	21 Jan 1974	(England) National Sporting Club, Piccadilly, London, United Kingdom	
Loss	9-3-1	(United Kingdom) "Boxing" Trevor Francis	PTS	8	21 Nov 1973	Sophia Gardens, Cardiff, Wales, United Kingdom	78-78.5.
Win	29-31-4	(United Kingdom) Des Rea	TKO	4	5 Oct 1973	Sophia Gardens, Cardiff, Wales, United Kingdom	
Win	16-8-3	(United Kingdom) Les Pearson	PTS	8	26 Sep 1973	(England) Midland Sporting Club, Solihull, West Midlands, United Kingdom	
Win	19-15-1	(United Kingdom) Amos Talbot	PTS	8	12 Mar 1973	(Wales) Anglo-Welsh Sporting Club, Caerphilly, United Kingdom	39.75-38.5.
Win	27-25-2	(United Kingdom) Des Rea	PTS	8	15 Jan 1973	(Wales) Double Diamond Club, Caerphilly, United Kingdom	
Loss	10-0	(United Kingdom) Charlie Cooper	DQ	7	22 Nov 1972	(Essex) Cliffs Pavilion, Southend, United Kingdom	
Win	7-11-1	(United Kingdom) Phil Dykes	TKO	3	19 Sep 1972	(Lancashire) King's Hall, Manchester, United Kingdom	
Win	13-8	(United Kingdom) Mickey Flynn	PTS	8	15 May 1972	(England) Mayfair Sporting Club, Mayfair, London, United Kingdom	39.5-39.
Win	5-7	(Jamaica) Jimmy Fairweather	PTS	8	20 Apr 1972	(England) Manor Place Baths, Walworth, London, United Kingdom	
Loss	4-6-1	(Scotland) "Boxing" Alan Reid	PTS	6	11 Oct 1971	(Lancashire) Manchester, United Kingdom	
Win	4-2	(United Kingdom) Johnny Shields	PTS	6	17 May 1971	(Lancashire) Hotel Piccadilly, Manchester, United Kingdom	
Win	7-8	(United Kingdom) Tony Bagshaw	PTS	6	3 May 1971	Cleethorpes, Lincolnshire, United Kingdom	
Draw	3-10	(Ghana) Mohammed Ellah	PTS	6	20 Apr 1971	(Monmouthshire (historic)) Newport, Monmouthshire, United Kingdom	
Win	4-3-1	(Scotland) "Boxing" Alan Reid	PTS	6	29 Mar 1971	(Lancashire) Manchester, United Kingdom	
Win	10-10-2	(Wales) Tony Burnett	DQ	4	23 Mar 1971	(Monmouthshire (historic)) Newport, Monmouthshire, United Kingdom	
No Contest	7-7	(United Kingdom) Tony Bagshaw	NC	4	22 Feb 1971	(Lancashire) Manchester, United Kingdom	
Win	3-9	(Ghana) Mohammed Ellah	PTS	6	9 Feb 1971	(Monmouthshire (historic)) Newport, Monmouthshire, United Kingdom	
Win	7-5	(United Kingdom) "Boxing" Keith White	PTS	6	12 Jan 1971	(England) Shoreditch Town Hall, Shoreditch, London, United Kingdom	
Win	1-0-1	(United Kingdom) Ray "The Dart" Farrell	KO	2	14 Dec 1970	(Lancashire) Manchester, United Kingdom	

== See also ==
- List of British welterweight boxing champions
