= Sugar Ray Leonard vs. Dave Boy Green =

Boxing match

The Champ Comes Home
- Date: March 31, 1980
- Venue: Capital Centre, Landover, Maryland, U.S.
- Title(s) on the line: WBC and The Ring welterweight titles

Tale of the tape
Boxer	Ray Leonard	Dave Boy Green
Nickname	Sugar	The Fenland Tiger
Hometown	Palmer Park, Maryland, U.S.	Chatteris, Cambridgeshire, England
Purse	$1,400,000	$100,000
Pre-fight record	26–0 (17 KO)	33–2 (26 KO)
Age	23 years, 10 months	26 years, 9 months
Height	5 ft 10 in (178 cm)	5 ft 9 in (175 cm)
Weight	147 lb (67 kg)	147 lb (67 kg)
Style	Orthodox	Orthodox
Recognition	WBC and The Ring; Welterweight Champion	WBC; No. 10 Ranked Welterweight

Result
- Leonard wins via 4th-round knockout

Sugar Ray Leonard vs. Dave Boy Green, billed as The Champ Comes Home, was a professional boxing match contested on March 31, 1980 for the WBC and The Ring welterweight titles.

== Background ==
In early February 1980, it was announced that newly-crowned WBC welterweight champion "Sugar" Ray Leonard, who had won the title at the end of November the previous year after defeating Wilfred Benítez by technical knockout in the 15th round, would return to his native Maryland to make his first defense against fringe contender Dave "Boy" Green, who was the WBC's number-ten ranked welterweight contender.

Just before the Leonard–Green fight was announced, Leonard dismissed his long-time trainer Dave Jacobs, who had been Leonard's head amateur trainer since Leonard was 14-years old and then his assistant trainer since he turned professional in 1976, over a pay dispute. However, just days later, Leonard and Jacobs settled their difference and Jacobs returned to Leonard's camp though Jacobs declined to discuss what amount he and Leonard settled on telling the press that it was "just between me and Ray Leonard."

The Leonard–Green fight was part of an unprecedented four-hour boxing telecast aired by ABC that featured four championship fights across three different cities. The other three title fights were Marvin Johnson defending the WBA light heavyweight title against Eddie Gregory, John Tate making the first defense of his WBA heavyweight title against Mike Weaver and finally, WBC heavyweight champion Larry Holmes capping off the program with a defense of his WBC heavyweight title against Leroy Jones.

== Fight Details ==
For the first three rounds, Leonard mostly kept his distance from the overmatched Green, who although moving towards Leonard for most of the fight, struggled to land many punches on his quick and elusive opponent. Leonard would land jabs on Green nearly at will and occasionally land brief combinations all while avoiding Green's punches. However, towards the end of the fourth round, Leonard stunned Green with a right uppercut and then unleashed a combination to Green's head ending with a left hook that sent Green down flat on his back. Arthur Mercante Sr. began counting, but with Green unconscious and in need of medical attention stopped the count at six and waved the fight off.

Green would remain unconscious for several minutes before being revived by medical personal and was unable to attend the post-fight press conference.

== Fight card ==
Confirmed bouts:

Weight Class	Weight		vs.		Method	Round	Notes
Welterweight	147 lbs.	Ray Leonard (c)	def.	Dave Boy Green	KO	4/15	^{note 1}
Light Middleweight	154 lbs.	Roger Leonard	def.	Johnny Gant	UD	8/8
Super Bantamweight	122 lbs.	Derrik Holmes	def.	Isaac Vega	KO	1/8
Heavyweight	200+ lbs.	George Williams	def.	Quinnie Locklear	KO	2/4
Super Lightweight	140 lbs.	Des Morrison	def.	Otis Hooper	TKO	3/4

^Note 1 For WBC and The Ring Welterweight Titles

== Broadcasting ==
Country	Broadcaster
United States	ABC

Preceded by vs. Wilfred Benítez	Ray Leonard's bouts 31 March 1980	Succeeded by vs. Roberto Durán
Preceded by vs. Dicky Eklund	Dave Green's bouts 31 March 1980	Succeeded by vs. Mario Mendez
