= Tony Laing =

Tony Laing may refer to:

- Eduardo Laing (born 1958), known as Tony, retired Honduran football player
- Tony Laing (boxer) (born 1957), Jamaican/British boxer
