= Tony McKenzie =

British former boxer (born 1963)

Personal information
- Nationality: British
- Born: 4 March 1963 (age 63) Leicester, England
- Height: 5 ft 9 in (175 cm)
- Weight: Light welterweight

Boxing career
- Stance: Orthodox

Boxing record
- Total fights: 34
- Wins: 26
- Win by KO: 19
- Losses: 7
- Draws: 1

Tony McKenzie (born 4 March 1963) is a British former boxer who was British light welterweight champion between 1986 and 1987.

== Career ==
Born in Leicester, Tony McKenzie made his professional debut in November 1983 with a third-round knockout of Albert Buchanan. In March 1985 he unsuccessfully fought Tony Laing for the vacant BBBofC Midlands Area light welterweight title, being stopped in the eighth round.

He won his next four fights, culminating in a points win over Michael Harris to set up a fight for the vacant British title against Clinton McKenzie in September 1986. He knocked Clinton out in the third round to become British champion. He made a successful defence of the title only five weeks later against Harris but lost the title in January 1987 when he was stopped in the third round by Lloyd Christie.

In June 1991 he knocked out New Zealand champion Alberto MaChong in a Commonwealth title eliminator and in February 1992 faced the unbeaten Andy Holligan for both the Commonwealth and British titles; Holligan stopped McKenzie in the third round.

McKenzie was out of the ring for the rest of the year but returned in January 1993 in a British title eliminator against Michael Driscoll. McKenzie took a points decision but didn't get to fight for the title again. He had one further fight, a rematch against Driscoll in which he was knocked out in the fifth round, before retiring from boxing.
