= Jimmy Batten =

English boxer (1955–2026)

Personal information
- Nationality: British
- Born: 7 November 1955 Millwall, London, England
- Died: 2 September 2026 (aged 70)
- Weight: Light middleweight

Boxing career

Boxing record
- Total fights: 49
- Wins: 40
- Win by KO: 21
- Losses: 9

Jimmy Batten (7 November 1955 – 2 September 2026) was a British boxer who was the British light middleweight champion for over two and a half years between 1977 and 1979.

== Biography ==
Born in Millwall, London on 7 November 1955, Batten started boxing at the age of 6, taking it up more seriously at the age of 10, and had a successful junior amateur career, winning three national schoolboy titles, two junior ABA titles and an NABC championship, going unbeaten for five and a half years.

Batten turned professional in 1974, training under Terry Lawless at the Royal Oak gym in Canning Town, and won 16 of his first 18 fights, which included a victory over former British title challenger Kevin White, leading to his facing Albert Hillman at the Royal Albert Hall in February 1977 for the British light middleweight title vacated by Maurice Hope; Hillman retired in the seventh round, making Batten the third man to hold the title, at the age of 21.

Four wins, including non-title victories over Trevor Francis and Michel Chapier followed before he made the first defence of his British title in October 1977 against former champion Larry Paul, stopping the challenger in the fourth round. In 1978 he beat French welterweight champion Georges Warusfel before making a second successful defence of the British title against Tony Poole, stopping him in the thirteenth round to win the Lonsdale Belt outright. Two months later he faced Frenchman Gilbert Cohen for the vacant European light middleweight title, losing via a third-round knockout.

He beat Dave Proud in 1979 before making the third defence of his title in September against Pat Thomas. Thomas stopped him in the ninth round to take the title.

Batten won his next five fights before losing on points in May 1981 to Chris Christian. He then travelled to the United States, where he was based in Chicago for almost two years; There he had a series of fights starting with two easy wins before he was stopped in the first round in May 1982 by Mario Maldonado. He beat Jeff Madison in September before facing Roberto Durán in November of 1982 at the Miami Orange Bowl; Durán took a unanimous decision, Batten taking him the distance despite suffering three broken ribs.

He returned to the UK where he beat future British champion Jimmy Cable in February 1983, before travelling to Durban in May to face South African champion Gregory Clark, losing on points. He returned to the U.S. in August where he stopped journeyman William Page in the fifth round. Back in the UK he faced Prince Rodney in October 1983 for the British light middleweight title vacated by Herol Graham. Rodney stopped him in the sixth round, and Batten subsequently retired from boxing after tests indicated that he had brain damage.

To deal with his brain damage he had speech therapy at a drama school and went on to work as an actor, having several small roles in the 1980s and 1990s, appearing in television series such as The Bill and The Detectives, and films such as Tank Malling (1989), The Krays (1990), Riff-Raff (1991) and Ladybird, Ladybird (1994). He worked as a stand-up comedian and briefly as a doorman and spent three months in prison after an altercation with three customers. He worked as a boxing trainer and later made a career as a karaoke host and singer.

Jimmy Batten died from complications of Parkinson's disease on 2 September 2026, aged 70.
