= Colin Powers =

English boxer (1956–2026)

Personal information
- Nationality: British
- Born: 2 February 1956 London, England
- Died: 16 September 2026 (aged 70)
- Weight: Light welterweight

Boxing career

Boxing record
- Total fights: 34
- Wins: 28
- Win by KO: 20
- Losses: 5
- Draws: 1

Colin Powers (2 February 1956 – 16 September 2026) was a British boxer who was British light welterweight champion between 1977 and 1979 and European champion in 1978.

== Career ==
Born in London, Colin Powers made his professional debut in June 1975 with a win over Kevin Quinn. In September 1976 he fought Des Morrison for the vacant BBBofC Southern Area super lightweight title, Morrison stopping him in the fifth round to inflict the first defeat of his professional career.

Powers was unbeaten in the next year, beating Joey Singleton, Clinton McKenzie and Efisio Pinna, leading to a fight against Morrison for the vacant British light welterweight title at the York Hall in October 1977. Powers had Morrison down three times before stopping him in the tenth round to become British champion.

He successfully defended the British title against Chris Walker in February 1978 and in June that year fought Jean-Baptiste Piedvache for the European title at the Palais des Sports in Paris; Powers stopped Piedvache in the eleventh round to become European champion. Powers defended the title three months later against Fernando Sánchez, losing after being stopped in the tenth.

Having relinquished the British title to pursue higher honours, in February 1979 he regained it from Clinton McKenzie, taking a points decision. The two met again for the title in September, this time McKenzie taking the decision.

Powers returned in January 1980 in a British title eliminator against Sylvester Mittee. Mittee stopped him in the seventh round.

He continued until 1983, his final fight a defeat at the hands of Lloyd Christie.

== Death ==
Powers died of cancer on 16 September 2026, aged 70.
