= Dave Boy Green =

British boxer

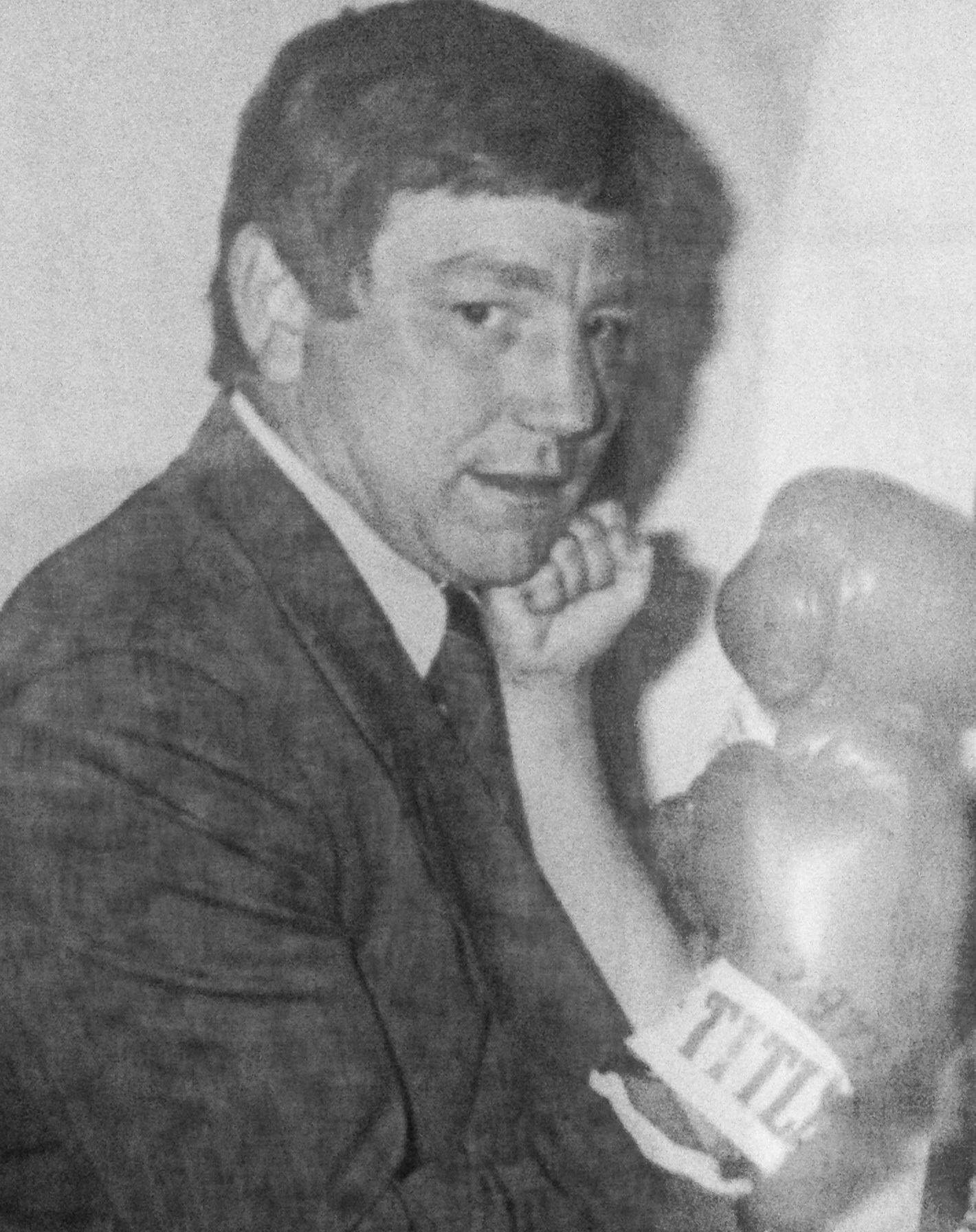

Personal information
- Nickname: Fenland Tiger
- Nationality: English
- Born: David Robert Green; 2 June 1953 (age 73) Chatteris, Cambridgeshire, England
- Weight: Light-welterweight; Welterweight

Boxing career
- Stance: Orthodox

Boxing record
- Total fights: 41
- Wins: 37
- Win by KO: 29
- Losses: 4

David Robert Green MBE (born 2 June 1953), better known as Dave Boy Green, is a British former professional boxer who competed from 1974 to 1981. He challenged twice for the WBC welterweight title; first in 1977 against Carlos Palomino and again in 1980 against Sugar Ray Leonard. At regional level, he held the British and European super-lightweight titles in 1976, becoming the first British fighter to hold the latter, and the European welterweight title in 1979.

== Early life ==
Green was born on 2 June 1953, in Chatteris, Cambridgeshire, a small fenland town. His father was a farmer and so Green's first experience of work was helping out around the family farm. He attended Cromwell School where he was keen on football and cross country running, but took up boxing in 1967 after joining the Chatteris Amateur Boxing Club. He was trained by Arthur Binder who had taught Eric Boon, a famous local boxer. Green had 105 amateur contests, winning 84 with 33 inside the distance.

== Professional career ==
In 1974, Green turned professional under the guidance of manager Andy Smith. He made his professional debut on 10 December 1974, when he beat Yotham Kunda by knockout in the second round. Green went on to achieve 15 straight wins, earning a shot at the British light-welterweight title.

=== British light-welterweight champion ===
On 1 June 1976, Green entered the ring in a tiger-skin dressing-gown to win the British light-welterweight title against Joey Singleton with powerful hooks to the head and body. Singleton retired in the sixth round.

=== European light-welterweight champion ===
On 7 December 1976 Green took on the Pride of Paris, Jean-Baptiste Piedvache, for the vacant European light-welterweight title. Green was staggered in the eighth round but Piedvache's left eye was beginning to close. With a strong right and left hooks, Green retired Piedvache in the ninth round while ahead on points. It was Green's 22nd straight win with 18 inside the distance.

On 29 March 1977, Green fought John H. Stracey at Wembley as a final eliminator to challenge for the WBC welterweight title. Stracey was a former WBC welterweight champion from the tough East End of London. The odds appeared to be even going into the bout, but Green went on to win the match due to Stracey's left eye starting to close.

=== Challenger for world title ===
==== Green vs. Palomino ====
On 14 June 1977, Green challenged Carlos Palomino for the WBC welterweight title at Empire Pool. Fortunes swayed with Green digging deep, his left eye closing, but Palomino boxed superbly to win by a left-hook knockout in the 11th round. It was the first time Green had been floored as a professional. After his loss, Green's next bout was against Andy Price, beating him on points.

==== European welterweight champion ====
On 23 January 1979, Green challenged Henry Rhiney for the European welterweight title. It was an all-British fight with all the tickets sold. The bout started at a terrific pace both men going toe-to-toe. A solid right to the head of Rhiney in the fifth round led the referee, Sid Nathan, to stop the fight, making Green a dual European Champion, and the first Englishman to do so since Ted Lewis in 1920.

On 28 June 1979, Green defended his European welterweight title against Dane Jørgen Hansen. Green knocked Hansen down in the second round, but the Dane fought on, knocking Green down twice in the third, and forcing the referee to stop the bout. Being a true sportsman Green applauded Hansen when the belt was presented.

==== Green vs. Leonard ====
The final challenge for the WBC welterweight title happened on 31 March 1980 against the holder Sugar Ray Leonard at the Capital Centre Landover, Maryland US. Green suffered a devastating knockout in the fourth round being out cold before he hit the canvas. Referee Arthur Mercante, ruled that it was too dangerous to continue the count and stopped at six. The Times reported "Leaning forward, dipping to left and right so that either hand could hit with equal venom, Leonard struck Green with a left and followed up quickly with a right-left-right, that started a clangour in Green's head, and the Briton crashed onto his back at the same place in the ring where Carlos Palomino had sent him toppling backwards".

=== Later career ===
After his loss to Leonard, Green returned to the ring on 14 November 1980, against American Mario Mendez, stopping him in the second round. Green's final bout, on 3 November 1981, was at the Royal Albert Hall against Reg Ford a New York-based Guyanese who was a one time sparring partner to Thomas Hearns. Andy Smith retired Green in the fifth round with cuts and a closing left eye.

== After boxing ==
Green appeared in the BBC series Superstars where he competed in the multi discipline event against other sports stars.

Green is Chairman of Renoak Limited in Chatteris, a company he founded with Bob Emerson. Green takes part in charity golf events. His success can be summed up by Sugar Ray Leonard, "Dave was a brave fighting man who never gave less than one hundred per cent whenever he put the gloves on. He is a warm human being who does tremendous work for charity, and I'm thrilled he has made such a success in business".

Green married Kay Curson on 26 October 1974. They have a son and twin daughters. In 2012, Green was awarded an MBE for services to Boxing and Charity in the Cambridgeshire area.

In recent years it has been reported that Green has been suffering from dementia. He stood down from Fenland District Council in 2018 due to ill health, although it wasn't stated what the illness was.

== Professional boxing record ==
| 41 fights | 37 wins | 4 losses |
|---|---|---|
| By knockout | 29 | 4 |
| By decision | 8 | 0 |
| Draws | 0 | |

| No. | Result | Record | Opponent | Type | Round, time | Date | Location | Notes |
|---|---|---|---|---|---|---|---|---|
| 41 | Loss | 37–4 | (United States) Reggie Ford | RTD | 5 (10), 3:00 | 3 Nov 1981 | (United Kingdom) Royal Albert Hall, London, England | |
| 40 | Win | 37–3 | (United States) Danny Long | TKO | 4 (10), 1:30 | 2 Jun 1981 | (United Kingdom) Royal Albert Hall, London, England | |
| 39 | Win | 36–3 | (Spain) Jose Ramon Gomez Fouz | PTS | 8 | 24 Feb 1981 | (United Kingdom) Royal Albert Hall, London, England | |
| 38 | Win | 35–3 | (United States) Gary Holmgren | TKO | 6 (8), 2:38 | 27 Jan 1981 | (United Kingdom) Royal Albert Hall, London, England | |
| 37 | Win | 34–3 | (United States) Mario Mendez | TKO | 2 (10) | 14 Nov 1980 | (United Kingdom) Royal Albert Hall, London, England | |
| 36 | Loss | 33–3 | (United States) Sugar Ray Leonard | KO | 4 (15), 2:27 | 31 Mar 1980 | (United States) Capital Centre, Landover, Maryland, US | For WBC and The Ring welterweight titles |
| 35 | Win | 33–2 | (United States) Dick Eklund | PTS | 10 | 4 Dec 1979 | (United Kingdom) Empire Pool, London, England | |
| 34 | Win | 32–2 | (United States) Steve Michalerya | TKO | 3 (10), 2:04 | 25 Sep 1979 | (United Kingdom) Empire Pool, London, England | |
| 33 | Loss | 31–2 | (Denmark) Jørgen Hansen | KO | 3 (12) | 14 May 1979 | Randers Hallen, Randers, Denmark | Lost European welterweight title |
| 32 | Win | 31–1 | (United States) Rafael Rodriguez | TKO | 8 (10) | 26 Jun 1979 | (United Kingdom) Conference Centre, London, England | |
| 31 | Win | 30–1 | (Canada) Lawrence Hafey | TKO | 5 (10) | 1 May 1979 | (United Kingdom) Empire Pool, London, England | |
| 30 | Win | 29–1 | (United Kingdom) Henry Rhiney | TKO | 5 (12) | 29 Jan 1979 | (United Kingdom) Royal Albert Hall, London, England | Won European welterweight title |
| 29 | Win | 28–1 | (United States) Sammy Masias | KO | 1 (10) | 5 Dec 1978 | (United Kingdom) Royal Albert Hall, London, England | |
| 28 | Win | 27–1 | (United States) Aundra Love | TKO | 8 (10) | 7 Nov 1978 | (United Kingdom) Empire Pool, London, England | |
| 27 | Win | 26–1 | (Bermuda) Roy Johnson | KO | 4 (10) | 21 Feb 1978 | (United Kingdom) Royal Albert Hall, London, England | |
| 26 | Win | 25–1 | (United Kingdom) Andy Price | PTS | 10 | 27 Sep 1977 | (United Kingdom) Empire Pool, London, England | |
| 25 | Loss | 24–1 | (Mexico) Carlos Palomino | KO | 11 (15), 2:05 | 14 Jun 1977 | (United Kingdom) Empire Pool, London, England | For WBC and The Ring welterweight titles |
| 24 | Win | 24–0 | (United Kingdom) John H. Stracey | TKO | 10 (10), 1:40 | 29 Mar 1977 | (United Kingdom) Empire Pool, London, England | |
| 23 | Win | 23–0 | (Argentina) Mario Omar Guillotti | PTS | 10 | 22 Feb 1977 | (United Kingdom) Royal Albert Hall, London, England | |
| 22 | Win | 22–0 | (France) Jean-Baptiste Piedvache | RTD | 9 (15), 3:00 | 7 Dec 1976 | (United Kingdom) Royal Albert Hall, London, England | Won vacant European super-lightweight title |
| 21 | Win | 21–0 | (United States) Jimmy Heair | PTS | 10 | 9 Nov 1976 | (United Kingdom) Empire Pool, London, England | |
| 20 | Win | 20–0 | (Ecuador) Ramiro Bolanos | TKO | 4 (10), 1:30 | 26 Oct 1976 | (United Kingdom) Royal Albert Hall, London, England | |
| 19 | Win | 19–0 | (Italy) Ugo Di Pietro | KO | 1 (10), 2:12 | 12 Oct 1976 | (United Kingdom) Empire Pool, London, England | |
| 18 | Win | 18–0 | (France) Jean Pierre Younsi | TKO | 1 (10), 2:50 | 14 Sep 1976 | (United Kingdom) Royal Albert Hall, London, England | |
| 17 | Win | 17–0 | (Italy) Ernesto Bergamasco | TKO | 5 (10), 0:21 | 22 Jun 1976 | (United Kingdom) Empire Pool, London, England | |
| 16 | Win | 16–0 | (United Kingdom) Joey Singleton | RTD | 6 (15), 3:00 | 1 Jun 1976 | (United Kingdom) Royal Albert Hall, London, England | Won British super-lightweight title |
| 15 | Win | 15–0 | (United Kingdom) Herbie McLean | RTD | 4 (10), 3:00 | 27 Apr 1976 | (United Kingdom) Royal Albert Hall, London, England | |
| 14 | Win | 14–0 | (United Kingdom) Jim Montague | PTS | 8 | 6 Apr 1976 | (United Kingdom) Royal Albert Hall, London, England | |
| 13 | Win | 13–0 | (Italy) Giuseppe Minotti | TKO | 4 (8), 2:02 | 20 Mar 1976 | (United Kingdom) Empire Pool, London, England | |
| 12 | Win | 12–0 | (United Kingdom) Billy Waith | TKO | 11 (12), 2:35 | 2 Mar 1976 | (United Kingdom) Royal Albert Hall, London, England | |
| 11 | Win | 11–0 | (United Kingdom) George McGurk | KO | 2 (10), 2:50 | 20 Jan 1976 | (United Kingdom) Royal Albert Hall, London, England | |
| 10 | Win | 10–0 | (United Kingdom) Alan Salter | TKO | 1 (10), 1:25 | 25 Nov 1975 | (United Kingdom) Royal Albert Hall, London, England | |
| 9 | Win | 9–0 | (United Kingdom) Brian Jones | KO | 2 (10), 0:55 | 10 Nov 1975 | (United Kingdom) Guild Hall, Cambridge, England | |
| 8 | Win | 8–0 | (United Kingdom) Al Stewart | TKO | 2 (8), 2:45 | 14 Oct 1975 | (United Kingdom) Royal Albert Hall, London, England | |
| 7 | Win | 7–0 | (United Kingdom) Angus McMillan | PTS | 8 | 3 Jun 1975 | (United Kingdom) Royal Albert Hall, London, England | |
| 6 | Win | 6–0 | (United Kingdom) Tommy Joyce | KO | 3 (8), 2:35 | 12 May 1975 | (United Kingdom) Hilton Hotel, London, England | |
| 5 | Win | 5–0 | (United Kingdom) George Salmon | PTS | 8 | 8 Apr 1975 | (United Kingdom) Sporting Club, Cambridge, England | |
| 4 | Win | 4–0 | (United Kingdom) Barton Mcallister | TKO | 2 (6), 2:50 | 11 Mar 1975 | (United Kingdom) Empire Pool, London, England | |
| 3 | Win | 3–0 | (United Kingdom) Derek Simpson | RTD | 7 (8), 3:00 | 12 Feb 1975 | (United Kingdom) Guild Hall, Cambridge, England | |
| 2 | Win | 2–0 | (United Kingdom) Dave Coombs | KO | 2 (6), 1:56 | 20 Jan 1975 | (United Kingdom) Hilton Hotel, London, England | |
| 1 | Win | 1–0 | (Zambia) Yotham Kunda | KO | 2 (6) | 10 Dec 1974 | (United Kingdom) Ice Rink, Nottingham, England | |

== See also ==
- List of British light-welterweight boxing champions
- List of European Boxing Union welterweight champions
- List of European Boxing Union light welterweight champions

== Bibliography ==
- Lloyd, Melanie (2017). Sweet Fighting Man: Ring of Truth. Pitch Publishing, Durrington. ISBN 978-1-78531-315-8.

Sporting positions
Regional boxing titles
| Preceded by Henry Rhiney | European welterweight champion 29 January 1979 – 14 May 1979 | Succeeded by Jørgen Hansen |
| Vacant Title last held by Cemal Kamaci | European light-welterweight champion 7 December 1976; Vacated | Vacant Title next held by Primo Bandini |
| Preceded by Joey Singleton | British light-welterweight champion 1 June 1976; Vacated | Vacant Title next held by Colin Powers |
