= Larry Paul =

Former British Champion Boxer

Personal information
- Nationality: British
- Born: 19 April 1952 Liverpool, England
- Died: 9 October 2017 (aged 65) London
- Weight: Light middleweight, welterweight

Boxing career

Boxing record
- Total fights: 40
- Wins: 30
- Win by KO: 16
- Losses: 9
- Draws: 1

Larry Paul (19 April 1952 – 9 October 2017) was a British boxer who was the first to hold the British light middleweight title, holding it between September 1973 and November 1974.

== Career ==
Born in Liverpool in 1952 to a White Irish Mother and Trinidadian Father, Larry Paul took up boxing at the age of 14 at the Florence Institute and went on to have a successful amateur career in which he lost only 10 of his 110 fights, represented England, and won junior and senior titles including the 1972 Amateur Boxing Association British light-middleweight title, when boxing out of the Shrewsbury ABC.

He turned professional in 1973 and relocated to Shrewsbury. Larry was managed throughout his professional boxing career by Mike Sendall. After winning his first seven fights, including victories over former Spanish welterweight champion Antonio Torres, Don McMillan, and Pat Dwyer, he faced Bobby Arthur in September 1973 for the inaugural British light middleweight title. Paul knocked Arthur out in the tenth round to become British champion. He defended the title successfully in April 1974 against Kevin White, and made a second defence in September against Maurice Hope; Hope knocked Paul out in the eighth round to take the title.

In March 1975 he faced Alan Minter at the Royal Albert Hall, losing by only half a point over ten rounds. In September he met Hope again for the British title, this time Hope stopping him in the fourth round.

He moved down to welterweight to challenge Peter Morris for the vacant BBBofC Midlands Area title, winning after Morris retired after two rounds. Back at light middleweight, Paul won a final eliminator for the British title in May 1977 against Pat Thomas, with Thomas disqualified for persistent holding, setting up a challenge for Jimmy Batten's title in October. Batten stopped Paul in the fourth round at the Royal Albert Hall to retain the title.

Only five weeks later Paul travelled to Milan to face WBC World Champion Rocky Mattioli in a non-title fight, losing the fight on points. Eight days later he faced German champion Frank Wissenbach in Berlin, losing via a second-round knockout. In April 1978 he had his final fight, a points victory over Joe Jackson in Coventry.

In October 2017, Larry Paul died in Croydon. He is survived by his four children, Colin, Reece, Charlotte and Holly. He also left behind 8 grandchildren.
