= Wilfred Benítez vs. Sugar Ray Leonard =

Professional boxing match

- Date: November 30, 1979
- Venue: Caesars Palace, Paradise, Nevada, U.S.
- Title(s) on the line: WBC and The Ring welterweight titles

Tale of the tape
| Boxer | Wilfred Benítez | Ray Leonard |
| Nickname | El Radar ("The Radar") | Sugar |
| Hometown | San Juan, Puerto Rico | Palmer Park, Maryland, U.S. |
| Purse | $1,200,000 | $1,000,000 |
| Pre-fight record | 38–0–1 (24 KO) | 25–0 (16 KO) |
| Age | 21 years, 2 months | 23 years, 6 months |
| Height | 5 ft 10 in (178 cm) | 5 ft 10 in (178 cm) |
| Weight | 144 1/2 lb (66 kg) | 146 lb (66 kg) |
| Style | Orthodox | Orthodox |
| Recognition | WBC and The Ring; Welterweight champion 2-division world champion | WBC/The Ring; No. 2 Ranked Welterweight |

Result
- Leonard wins via 15th-round TKO

Wilfred Benítez vs. Sugar Ray Leonard was a professional boxing match contested on November 30, 1979, for the WBC and The Ring welterweight titles.

== Background ==
In late 1979 Top Rank promoter Bob Arum organized a two-city boxing event (with one card taking place in Nevada's Caesars Palace and the other in New Orleans' Superdome) headlined by an anticipated bout between reigning WBC welterweight champion Wilfred Benítez and "Sugar" Ray Leonard. Benitez had won the title earlier in the year, becoming a 2-division champion at only 21 years old, while Leonard had won all 27 of his fights after turning pro following an Olympic gold medal in 1976, and had emerged as a top contender for the welterweight title and one of boxing's most popular fighters. In addition to the Benitez–Leonard bout, the card in Las Vegas also featured Vito Antuofermo defending his undisputed middleweight title against Marvin Hagler. The card in New Orleans featured a WBA light heavyweight title fight between Victor Galindez and Marvin Johnson.

Benítez's father and trainer Gregorio had written an article for The Ring magazine titled "Why Benitez Will Lose His Title" in which he claimed his son was not training hard enough for the fight and stating that he wouldn't work his son's corner "Even if they gave me $200,000." Gregorio later admitted that he had written the article to motivate his son for the fight.

Benitez earned $1.2 million while Leonard netted $1 million, making their fight the richest non-heavyweight bout in boxing history at the time.

== The fights ==
=== Antuofermo vs. Hagler ===
Vito Antuofermo vs. Marvin Hagler
- Title(s) on the line: WBA, WBC and The Ring undisputed middleweight titles

Tale of the tape
| Boxer | Vito Antuofermo | Marvin Hagler |
| Nickname | | Marvelous |
| Hometown | Brooklyn, New York | Brockton, Massachusetts |
| Purse | $190,000 | $40,000 |
| Pre-fight record | 45–3–1 (19 KO) | 46–2–1 (38 KO) |
| Age | 26 years, 9 months | 25 years, 6 months |
| Height | 5 ft 7 1/2 in (171 cm) | 5 ft 9 in (175 cm) |
| Weight | 158 1/2 lb (72 kg) | 158 1/2 lb (72 kg) |
| Style | Orthodox | Southpaw |
| Recognition | WBA, WBC and The Ring undisputed Middleweight Champion | WBA/The Ring; No. 1 Ranked Middleweight; WBC; No. 2 Ranked Middleweight |

Result
- Split Draw

In the chief support Undisputed middleweight champion Vito Antuofermo made his first defence against Marvin Hagler. Antuofermo was a 4-1 underdog.

==== The fight ====
Hagler would dominate much of the fight with his jab and hooks, although Antuofermo would come on strong late as both men would come out swinging. At the end of 15 rounds, Judge Dalby Shirley had it 144–142 for Antuofermo, Duane Ford 145–141 for Hagler and Hal Miller had it 143–143 meaning Antuofermo retained the title on a split draw.

==== Aftermath ====
Soon after the decision been announced when Bob Arum, shouted at ringside that there would be an immediate rematch, despite Alan Minter being in line for a title shot regardless of the victor.

"The WBC will not be led by promoters," responded José Sulaimán, the WBC president. "We will have our convention in a week, and we will talk about it. There is no doubt Hagler deserves another chance. But after Minter."

| Preceded by vs. Hugo Corro | Vito Antuofermo's bouts 30 November 1979 | Succeeded by vs. Alan Minter |
| Preceded by vs. Norberto Rufino Cabrera | Marvin Hagler's bouts 30 November 1979 | Succeeded by vs. Loucif Hamani |
Awards
| Previous: Muhammad Ali vs. Leon Spinks | The Ring Upset of the Year; 1979 | Next: Samuel Serrano vs. Yasutsune Uehara |

=== Main Event ===
In a close, tactical fight, Leonard scored a technical knockout with only six seconds remaining in the 15th and final round. Leonard scored the only two knockdowns of the fight, first sending Benítez down on the seat of his pants with a well-timed left jab in the third round. The second knockdown came in the 15th round. With Benítez behind on the scorecards, he fought aggressively, but Leonard held his ground and went toe-to-toe with the champion. With 30 seconds remaining in the round, a Leonard left uppercut sent Benítez down on his knees. Though clearly hurt, Benítez was able to get back up and continue, but after Leonard landed two more punches, the referee Carlos Padilla stopped the fight and Leonard won by technical knockout at 2:54 of round 15. At the time of the stoppage, Leonard was ahead on all three of the judge's scorecards with scores of 137–133, 137–130 and 136–134.

== Aftermath ==
Speaking after the bout Leonard's trainer Angelo Dundee said "From a technical standpoint, there was more done in this fight than I've seen done for a long time. You saw two smart, scientific fighters—two champions in the ring at the same time. They brought the best out of each other."

Leonard was linked to bouts with WBA champion Pipino Cuevas and former lightweight champion Roberto Duran.

== Fight card ==
=== Caesars Palace (Paradise, Nevada) ===
Confirmed bouts:

| Weight Class | Weight | | vs. | | Method | Round | Notes |
|---|---|---|---|---|---|---|---|
| Welterweight | 147 lb | Ray Leonard | def. | Wilfred Benítez (c) | TKO | 15/15 | ^{Note 1} |
| Middleweight | 160 lb | Vito Antuofermo (c) | vs. | Marvin Hagler | D | 15/15 | ^{Note 2} |
| Light Middleweight | 154 lb | Roger Leonard | def. | Rudy Robles | SD | 8/8 |

^Note 1 For WBC, The Ring and lineal welterweight titles
^Note 2 For WBA, WBC, The Ring and lineal middleweight titles

=== Superdome (New Orleans, Louisiana) ===
Confirmed bouts:

| Weight Class | Weight | | vs. | | Method | Round | Notes |
|---|---|---|---|---|---|---|---|
| Light Heavyweight | 175 lb | Marvin Johnson | def. | Victor Galindez (c) | KO | 11/15 | ^{Note 1} |
| Middleweight | 160 lb | Thomas Hearns | def. | Mike Colbert | UD | 10/10 |
| Light Middleweight | 154 lb | Clinton Jackson | def. | Larry Rayford | TKO | 7/8 |

^Note 1 For WBA light heavyweight title

== Broadcasting ==
| Country | Broadcaster |
|---|---|
| United Kingdom | BBC/ITV |
| United States | ABC |

| Preceded by vs. Harold Weston | Wilfred Benítez's bouts 30 November 1979 | Succeeded by vs. Johnny Turner |
| Preceded by vs. Andy Price | Sugar Ray Leonard's bouts 30 November 1979 | Succeeded by vs. Dave Boy Green |
