= Sugar Ray Leonard vs. Roberto Durán III =

Boxing match

Uno Mas
- Date: December 7, 1989
- Venue: The Mirage, Paradise, Nevada, U.S.
- Title(s) on the line: WBC super middleweight title

Tale of the tape
Boxer	Ray Leonard	Roberto Durán
Nickname	Sugar	Manos de Piedra ("Hands of Stone")
Hometown	Palmer Park, Maryland, U.S.	Panama City, Panama Province, Panama
Purse	$15,000,000	$7,600,000
Pre-fight record	35–1–1 (25 KO)	85–7 (61 KO)
Age	33 years, 6 months	38 years, 5 months
Height	5 ft 10 in (178 cm)	5 ft 7 1/2 in (171 cm)
Weight	160 lb (73 kg)	158 lb (72 kg)
Style	Orthodox	Orthodox
Recognition	WBC; Super Middleweight Champion; The Ring; No. 1 Ranked Super Middleweight; 5-division world champion	WBC; Middleweight Champion; The Ring; No. 2 Ranked Middleweight; 4-division world champion

Result
- Leonard wins via 12-round unanimous decision (119-109, 116-111, 120-110)

Sugar Ray Leonard vs. Roberto Durán III, billed as Uno Mas, was a professional boxing match contest held on December 7, 1989, for the WBC super middleweight title.

== Background ==
Reigning WBC super middleweight champion "Sugar" Ray Leonard had made the first successful defense of his title after fighting Thomas Hearns to a draw. After the Hearns fight, Leonard began negotiations for both a third fight with rival Roberto Durán and a potential third fight with Hearns. Whilst a third Hearns fight never came into fruition, Leonard and Duran would reach an agreement to face one another and the fight was announced at a press conference on July 26, 1989, though the venue in which the fight would take place was still in question. Five days later, the then-yet-to-be-opened Mirage was announced as the venue for the fight. Durán had won the WBC middleweight title after upsetting Iran Barkley in his previous fight, though only Leonard's super middleweight was on the line. Leonard and Durán agreed to a catch-weight of 162 pounds, between the middleweight limit of 160 pounds and the super middleweight limit of 168 pounds. Initial plans called for both Leonard and Duran's titles to be at stake, but Duran's mandatory challenger Lindell Holmes refused to step aside and insisted on Duran making his next defense against him, resulting in Durán's title not being defended.

The fight was billed as "Uno Mas" (one more in Spanish) in reference to Leonard and Duran's second fight against each other in which Duran quit in round eight after apparently telling the referee "No Mas" (no more in Spanish). Leonard was a 9 to 5 favorite.

== The fight ==
In contrast to their first two fights, this was entirely lopsided in Leonard's favor. Using constant movement and counter-punching, Leonard dominated Duran, completely neutralizing Duran's offensive attack. Leonard landed 227 punches, good for 52% of his total thrown punches compared to Duran, who landed a dismal 84 punches at a 14% rate. The fight went the full 12-round distance, with all three judges scoring the fight for Leonard with scores of 120–110, 119–109 and 116–111.

== Aftermath ==
In August 1990, Leonard relinquished the WBC super-middleweight title, saying that he was under the weight for the division. He then offered Hearns a third fight, but Hearns said he could no longer make the weight and moved up to the light heavyweight division.

== Fight card ==
Confirmed bouts:

Weight Class	Weight		vs.		Method	Round	Notes
Super Middleweight	164 lb	Ray Leonard (c)	def.	Roberto Durán	UD	12/12	^{Note 1}
Heavyweight	190+ lb	Ray Mercer	def.	Ossie Ocasio	SD	8/8
Light heavyweight	175 lb	Andrew Maynard	def.	Mike DeVito	UD	8/8
Heavyweight	190+ lb	Tommy Morrison	def	Ken Lakusta	UD	6/6

^Note 1 For WBC Super Middleweight title

== Broadcasting ==
Country	Broadcaster
United Kingdom	ITV
United States	HBO

== See also ==
- Sugar Ray Leonard vs. Roberto Durán
- Roberto Durán vs. Sugar Ray Leonard II

Preceded by vs. Thomas Hearns II	Sugar Ray Leonard's bouts 7 December 1989	Succeeded by vs. Terry Norris
Preceded by vs. Iran Barkley	Roberto Durán's bouts 7 December 1989	Succeeded by vs. Pat Lawlor
