= Mo Hussein =

English boxer

Personal information
- Nationality: English
- Born: Murad Hussein; 17 November 1962 (age 63) Hackney, England
- Height: 5 ft 6 in (168 cm)
- Weight: light/light welterweight

Boxing career

Boxing record
- Total fights: 27
- Wins: 23 (KO 17)
- Losses: 4 (KO 3)

Mo Hussein (born 17 November 1962 in Hackney) is an English professional light/light welterweight boxer of the 1980s who won the British Boxing Board of Control (BBBofC) Southern Area lightweight title, and Commonwealth lightweight title, and was a challenger for the BBBofC British light welterweight title against Lloyd Christie, his professional fighting weight varied from 134 lb (61 kg; 9 st 8 lb), i.e. lightweight to 140 lb (64 kg; 10 st 0 lb), i.e. light welterweight. Mo Hussein was trained and managed by Jimmy Tibbs, and promoted by Frank Warren.

He has also had success as a trainer, training Irish champion Paul Upton.
