= Young McCormack =

Irish boxer

Personal information
- Nationality: Irish
- Born: John McCormack; 11 December 1944 (age 81) Dublin, Ireland
- Weight: Light heavyweight

Boxing career

Boxing record
- Total fights: 42
- Wins: 33
- Win by KO: 27
- Losses: 8
- Draws: 1

John McCormack (born 11 December 1944), better known as Young McCormack, is an Irish former boxer who was Irish and British light heavyweight champion in the 1960s.

== Career ==
Born in Dublin, the son of boxer Spike McCormack, John McCormack grew up on Sean McDermott Street with five brothers and eight sisters. Known as "Young Spike" early on, he became better known simply as "Young McCormack".

His professional career began in September 1963. From his first 23 pro fights he won 19, drew one and lost three, one of these to Belgian heavyweight champion Lion Ven. In June 1966 he faced his namesake John McCormack in an eliminator for the British light heavyweight title at the Royal Albert Hall, winning on points. He went on to win a final eliminator four months later against Derek Richards, setting up a fight against Eddie Avoth in June 1967 for the vacant title, preceded by wins over Victor Chapelle, Ven, and Valere Mahau. McCormack stopped Avoth in the seventh round at the National Sporting Club to become British champion. McCormack successfully defended the title against Richards in November 1967, and in February 1968 faced Bob Dunlop at the Sydney Stadium for the vacant Commonwealth title; Dunlop stopped McCormack in the seventh round.

McCormack made a second defence of his British title against Avoth in January 1969, and lost after being forced to retire in the eleventh round due to a cut to his left eyelid. McCormack had five further fights in 1969, winning three but losing to Guinea Roger and Tom Bogs. In April 1970 he had his final fight, another shot at the British title against Avoth; McCormack was disqualified in the eighth round.

His younger brother Pat was also a successful boxer, at lightweight through to welterweight, winning the British super lightweight title in 1974. McCormack went on to work with his brother Pat with young boxers at St. Saviours Olympic Boxing Academy on Dorset Street in Dublin.
