= Roberto Durán vs. Sugar Ray Leonard II =

Boxing competition

The Super Fight
- Date: November 25, 1980
- Venue: Louisiana Superdome, New Orleans, Louisiana, U.S.
- Title(s) on the line: WBC and The Ring welterweight titles

Tale of the tape
| Boxer | Roberto Durán | Ray Leonard |
| Nickname | Manos de Piedra ("Hands of Stone") | Sugar |
| Hometown | Panama City, Panama Province, Panama | Palmer Park, Maryland, U.S. |
| Purse | $8,000,000 | $7,000,000 |
| Pre-fight record | 72–1 (56 KO) | 27–1 (18 KO) |
| Age | 29 years, 5 months | 24 years, 6 months |
| Height | 5 ft 7 in (170 cm) | 5 ft 10 in (178 cm) |
| Weight | 146 lb (66 kg) | 146 lb (66 kg) |
| Style | Orthodox | Orthodox |
| Recognition | WBC and The Ring; Welterweight Champion; 2-division world champion | WBC/WBA; No. 1 Ranked Welterweight; The Ring; No. 2 Ranked Welterweight; Former welterweight champion |

Result
- Leonard wins via 8th-round TKO

Roberto Durán vs. Sugar Ray Leonard II, billed as The Super Fight, and later popularly known as the No Más Fight, was a professional boxing match contested on November 25, 1980, for the WBC and The Ring welterweight championship. It took place at the Louisiana Superdome in New Orleans, United States. It was the second of three bouts between the pair. It gained its name from the moment at the end of the eighth round when Durán turned away from Leonard towards the referee and quit by apparently saying, "No más" (Spanish for "No more").

== Background ==
Sugar Ray Leonard and Roberto Durán had first fought on June 20, 1980, in Montreal. Leonard was defending the World Boxing Council (WBC) Welterweight Championship for the second time. Durán was the WBC No. 1 welterweight contender. Leonard abandoned his usual slick boxing style and stood flat-footed with Durán. Durán won the first fight by a narrow but unanimous decision, with scores of 148–147, 145–144, and 146–144.

== The fight ==
The rematch took place November 25, 1980 at the Superdome in New Orleans. Leonard used his superior speed and movement to outbox and befuddle Durán. "The whole fight, I was moving, I was moving", Leonard said. "And Voom! I snapped his head back with a jab. Voom! I snapped it back again. He tried to get me against the ropes, I'd pivot, spin off and Pow! Come under with a punch."

In round 7, Leonard started to taunt Durán. Late in the round, winding up his right hand as if to throw a bolo punch, Leonard snapped out a left jab and caught Durán flush in the face. In the closing seconds of the eighth round, Durán turned his back to Leonard and quit, waving his glove and apparently saying to referee Octavio Meyran, "No más" ("No more" in Spanish). Leonard was the winner by a technical knockout (TKO) at 2:44 of round 8, regaining the WBC Welterweight Championship. Leonard led by a small margin of 68–66, 68–66 and 67–66 on the judges scorecards at the time of the TKO.

== Aftermath ==
Durán has said that he never said the words No mas to anyone following the bout. He blamed the broadcaster Howard Cosell for coming up with it and claiming he said it. He said he was only mumbling to himself "No sigo, no sigo, no sigo", meaning "I'm not carrying on". He has said that he quit because of stomach cramps, which started to bother him in the fifth round. He said the cramps occurred because he took off weight too quickly, then ate too much after the morning weigh-in, but his manager, Carlos Eleta, said Durán always ate that way before a fight. "Durán didn't quit because of stomach cramps", Eleta said. "He quit because he was embarrassed." Leonard claimed credit for having forced Durán to give up, and took great satisfaction in it. "I made him quit", Leonard said. "To make a man quit, to make Roberto Durán quit, was better than knocking him out." One version of what really happened (which Duran once said he wouldn't comment on) is that his actual statement of defeat was Spanish for "I can't continue."

According to Rhiannon Walker, "he explained that his manager, Panamanian businessman Carlos Eleta, made the mistake of scheduling the fight too close after the first fight, not allowing Duran enough time to drop the necessary weight."

Durán's stature in his home country of Panama took a dramatic dive after the fight. The immediate reaction was shock, followed by anger. Within hours, commercials featuring Durán (in both Panama and the United States) were ordered off the air.

On June 16, 1983, Durán's 32nd birthday, he knocked out undefeated Davey Moore in the eighth round to win the WBA Junior Middleweight Championship. In Panama, there was rejoicing in the streets.

Leonard and Durán fought a third and final time on December 7, 1989 in Las Vegas with Leonard retaining the WBC Super Middleweight Championship in a lopsided, 12-round unanimous decision.

== Media ==
The fight - along with the Leonard/Durán rivalry in the 1980s - was highlighted in the 30 for 30 episode No Más from 2013.

Both the first fight between Duran and Leonard and this bout are featured prominently in Hands of Stone, a 2016 biopic about Duran.

== Undercard ==
Confirmed bouts:

- Carlos DeLeon defeat Marvin Camel via majority decision to win the WBC Cruiserweight championship.
- Mark Holmes defeat Bruce Calloway via TKO at 1:35 of the 5th round.
- Sugar Ray Leonard's brother Roger Leonard defeat Melvin Dennis via a unanimous decision.
- Jerry Celestine knocked out Pablo Ramos at 2:23 of the 9th round.
- Melvin Paul won in his professional debut by stopping Chubby Johnson at 2:39 of the 3rd round.

== Broadcasting ==
| Country | Broadcaster |
|---|---|
| Mexico | Televisa |
| Philippines | MBS 4 |
| United Kingdom | ITV |
| United States | ABC |

== See also ==
- Sugar Ray Leonard vs. Roberto Durán (1st match)
- Sugar Ray Leonard vs. Roberto Durán III

| Preceded by First bout | Roberto Durán's bouts 25 November 1980 | Succeeded by vs. Nino Gonzalez |
| Preceded by First bout | Ray Leonard's bouts 25 November 1980 | Succeeded by vs. Larry Bonds |
