= Gaétan Hart =

Canadian boxer

Gaëtan Hart (born November 9, 1953) is a former lightweight/welterweight boxer from Québec, who was a three-time boxing champion for his country. He lost his only world title fight against Aaron Pryor in 1980. Boxer Cleveland Denny died 16 days after being knocked out by Hart in 1980. Six weeks prior to that bout, Hart defeated Ralph Racine and put him in a coma from which Racine eventually recovered.

In 1992, he was featured in a National Film Board of Canada documentary, The Steak (a title inspired by Jack London's short story A Piece of Steak), directed by Pierre Falardeau. Hart now runs a Gatineau (Hull, Quebec) boxing club.

An article on Hart appeared in the April 1979 The Ring magazine.

== Professional boxing record ==
91 fights	57 wins	30 losses
By knockout	25	14
By decision	32	16
Draws	4	

No.	Result	Record	Opponent	Type	Round, time	Date	Location	Notes
91	Loss	57–30–4	Mathias Bedburdick	TKO	3 (6), 1:21	Feb 29, 2000	Pierre-Charbonneau Centre, Montreal, Canada	
90	Loss	57–29–4	Michel Galarneau	UD	12	Oct 20, 1992	Forum, Montreal, Canada	For Canadian welterweight title
89	Loss	57–28–4	Greg Gayle	MD	8	Dec 11, 1990	The Palace, Laval, Canada	
88	Win	57–27–4	Michel Galarneau	MD	10	Oct 30, 1990	Paul Sauvé Arena, Montreal, Canada	
87	Loss	56–27–4	Pierre Huneault	MD	10	Oct 14, 1984	Forum, Montreal, Canada	
86	Loss	56–26–4	Jorge Nina	SD	10	Sep 17, 1984	Pavillon de la Jeunesse, Quebec City, Canada	
85	Loss	56–25–4	Remo Di Carlo	UD	12	Mar 25, 1984	Forum, Montreal, Canada	For Canadian lightweight titel
84	Win	56–24–4	Paul Collette	TKO	7 (8), 2:29	Dec 4, 1983	Forum, Montreal, Canada	
83	Win	55–24–4	Andre Sarrazin	UD	8	Nov 10, 1983	Paul Sauvé Arena, Montreal, Canada	
82	Win	54–24–4	Derrick Cuttino	UD	8	Aug 23, 1983	Le Carrefour Sport Centre, Laval, Canada	
81	Win	53–24–4	Kenny Smith	UD	8	Jul 29, 1983	Cornwall, Ontario, Canada	
80	Loss	52–24–4	Livingstone Bramble	UD	10	Apr 26, 1983	Tropicana Hotel & Casino, Atlantic City, New Jersey, U.S.	
79	Draw	52–23–4	Pierre Huneault	UD	10	Mar 22, 1983	Robert Guertin Arena, Hull, Canada	
78	Loss	52–23–3	Johnny Summerhays	SD	12	Dec 14, 1982	Paul Sauvé Arena, Montreal, Canada	Lost Canadian lightweight title
77	Loss	52–22–3	Donnie Poole	TKO	3 (10), 1:59	Sep 21, 1982	Paul Sauvé Arena, Montreal, Canada	
76	Win	52–21–3	Jean Lapointe	TKO	3 (12), 2:23	Jun 22, 1982	Paul Sauvé Arena, Montreal, Canada	Retained Canadian lightweight title
75	Win	51–21–3	Louis Hubela	UD	10	May 25, 1982	Civic Center, Ottawa, Canada	
74	Win	50–21–3	Rocky Zolnierczyk	UD	8	Apr 6, 1982	Paul Sauvé Arena, Montreal, Canada	
73	Win	49–21–3	Mike Blunt	TKO	10 (10), 2:49	Mar 4, 1982	Paul Sauvé Arena, Montreal, Canada	
72	Win	48–21–3	Michel Lalonde	UD	12	Dec 15, 1981	Paul Sauvé Arena, Montreal, Canada	Won Canadian lightweight title
71	Win	47–21–3	Donnie Poole	UD	10	Nov 3, 1981	Paul Sauvé Arena, Montreal, Canada	
70	Win	46–21–3	Johnny Copeland	TKO	4 (10), 2:35	Sep 10, 1981	Robert Guertin Arena, Hull, Canada	
69	Loss	45–21–3	Claude Noel	TKO	3 (10), 1:41	Mar 24, 1981	Paul Sauvé Arena, Montreal, Canada	
68	Win	45–20–3	Louis Hubela	SD	10	Feb 9, 1981	Civic Center, Ottawa, Canada	
67	Loss	44–20–3	Aaron Pryor	TKO	6 (15), 2:09	Nov 22, 1980	Riverfront Coliseum, Cincinnati, Ohio, U.S.	For WBA light welterweight title
66	Win	44–19–3	Pedro Acosta Nunez	UD	10	Sep 23, 1980	Paul Sauvé Arena, Montreal, Canada	
65	Win	43–19–3	Cleveland Denny	TKO	10 (10), 2:48	Jun 20, 1980	Olympic Stadium, Montreal, Canada	Denny dies 16 days later of injuries sustained in this bout
64	Win	42–19–3	Ralph Racine	TKO	12 (12), 1:43	May 7, 1980	Paul Sauvé Arena, Montreal, Canada	Racine went into a coma after this bout, eventually recovered; Retained Canadian lightweight title
63	Win	41–19–3	Nick Furlano	SD	12	Mar 25, 1980	Paul Sauvé Arena, Montreal, Canada	Won Canadian lightweight title
62	Win	40–19–3	Tim LaValley	KO	8 (10)	Mar 13, 1980	Robert Guertin Hotel, Hull, Canada	
61	Win	39–19–3	Ken Muse	UD	10	Jan 20, 1980	Concorde Hotel, Quebec City, Canada	
60	Win	38–19–3	Roberto Colon	TKO	4 (10), 2:00	Dec 23, 1979	Verdun Auditorium, Montreal, Canada	
59	Win	37–19–3	Benito Jimenez	TKO	4 (8), 1:49	Nov 6, 1979	Forum, Montreal, Canada	
58	Loss	36–19–3	Nick Furlano	MD	12	Aug 21, 1979	Forum, Montreal, Canada	Lost Canadian lightweight title
57	Loss	36–18–3	Ernest Bing	SD	10	Jul 24, 1979	Steel Pier Arena, Atlantic City, New Jersey, U.S.	
56	Win	36–17–3	Nick Furlano	SD	8	Jun 26, 1979	Forum, Montreal, Canada	
55	Draw	35–17–3	Ernest Bing	PTS	10	Jun 3, 1979	Port-Cartier, Quebec, Canada	
54	Win	35–17–2	Angel Cruz	MD	10	May 7, 1979	Palais des Sports, Gatineau, Canada	
53	Loss	34–17–2	Claude Noel	UD	10	Mar 30, 1979	Port-of-Spain, Trinidad and Tobago	
52	Win	34–16–2	Tommy Rose	UD	10	Feb 5, 1979	Robert Guertin Arena, Hull, Canada	
51	Win	33–16–2	Danny Daniels	TKO	3 (10), 2:32	Dec 19, 1978	Verdun Auditorium, Montreal, Canada	
50	Win	32–16–2	Johnny Summerhays	UD	12	Dec 5, 1978	Paul Sauvé Arena, Montreal Canada	Retained Canadian lightweight title
49	Win	31–16–2	Al Franklin	TKO	8 (10)	Nov 20, 1978	Salle des Chevaliers de Colomb, Buckingham, Canada	
48	Win	30–16–2	Ron Meaweather	KO	8 (?)	Sep 26, 1978	Hotel LaCite, Montreal, Canada	
47	Win	29–16–2	Quentin Blackman	UD	10	Aug 31, 1978	Stade Hiver Masson, Buckingham, Canada	
46	Win	28–16–2	Jean Lapointe	TKO	10 (12), 2:22	Jun 27, 1978	Paul Sauvé Arena, Montreal, Canada	Retained Canadian lightweight title
45	Win	27–16–2	Leo Marsh	KO	2 (12), 0:58	Jun 1, 1978	Arena, Hull, Canada	Retained Canadian lightweight title
44	Win	26–16–2	Cleveland Denny	SD	12	Apr 5, 1978	Forum, Montreal, Canada	Won CPBC (Canadian) lightweight title
43	Win	25–16–2	Rocky Orengo	UD	10	Feb 21, 1978	Forum, Montreal, Canada	
42	Win	24–16–2	Ralph Racine	UD	10	Jan 24, 1978	Forum, Montreal, Quebec	
41	Win	23–16–2	Michel Rouleau	UD	8	Dec 13, 1977	Paul Sauvé Arena, Montreal, Canada	
40	Win	22–16–2	Jim Henry	UD	10	Nov 22, 1977	Hotel Palace, Buckingham, Canada	
39	Win	21–16–2	Barry Sponagle	UD	8	Nov 1, 1977	Paul Sauvé Arena, Montreal, Canada	
38	Win	20–16–2	Willie Davis	PTS	8	Oct 24, 1977	Hotel Palace, Buckingham, Canada	
37	Loss	19–16–2	Cleveland Denny	UD	10	Sep 27, 1977	Paul Sauvé Arena, Montreal, Canada	
36	Win	19–15–2	Ricardo Raul Camoranesi	PTS	8	Jul 26, 1977	Montreal, Quebec, Canada	
35	Loss	18–15–2	Dominick Monaco	PTS	10	May 21, 1976	Prospect Hall, Brooklyn, New York, U.S.	
34	Win	18–14–2	James "Gil" King	TKO	3 (10), 1:07	May 3, 1976	Hull Arena, Hull, Canada	
33	Loss	17–14–2	Al Franklin	UD	8	Apr 22, 1976	Metropolitan Sports Center, Bloomington, Minnesota, U.S.	
32	Loss	17–13–2	Tony Petronelli	KO	12 (12), 2:36	Mar 17, 1976	WNAC-TV Studio, Boston, Massachusetts, U.S.	For NABF light welterweight title
31	Win	17–12–2	Leo DiFiore	KO	5 (10), 2:04	Feb 16, 1976	Alymer (Gatineau), Quebec, Canada	
30	Win	16–12–2	Luis Davila	KO	5 (10), 1:07	Jan 26, 1976	Salle Aylmer, Aylmer (Gatineau), Canada	
29	Win	15–12–2	Lamar Baskin	KO	3 (10)	Dec 22, 1975	Hotel Ambassador, Gatineau, Canada	
28	Loss	14–12–2	Alfredo Escalera	KO	6 (10)	Nov 17, 1975	San Juan, Puerto Rico	
27	Draw	14–11–2	Al Franklin	SD	10	Oct 28, 1975	De La Salle High School, Minneapolis, Minnesota, U.S.	
26	Win	14–11–1	Roland Sigman	KO	3 (10)	Sep 18, 1975	Arena, Hull, Canada	
25	Loss	13–11–1	Ricardo Thomatis	UD	8	Aug 22, 1975	Pick-Congress Hotel, Chicago, Illinois, U.S.	
24	Win	13–10–1	Danny Stokes	PTS	8	Jul 30, 1975	St. Lawrence Market, Toronto, Canada	
23	Win	12–10–1	Ron Jones	KO	1 (?)	Jul 25, 1975	Chicago, Illinois, U.S.	
22	Win	11–10–1	George Anderson	PTS	6	Jun 25, 1975	Metropolitan Sports Center, Bloomington, Minnesota, U.S.	
21	Win	10–10–1	Larry Moore	KO	2 (8)	Jun 17, 1975	Arena, Hull, Canada	
20	Loss	9–10–1	Cornell Hall	PTS	6	Jul 8, 1975	Civic Center, Ottawa, Canada	
19	Loss	9–9–1	Bruno Arcari	KO	1 (10)	May 10, 1975	Genoa, Liguria, Italy	Hart was a last-minute replacement when Victor Perez, the original opponent, failed to show up
18	Loss	9–8–1	Daniel Levesque	KO	3 (6), 2:52	Apr 30, 1975	Paul Sauvé Arena, Montreal, Canada	
17	Loss	9–7–1	Danny Stokes	PTS	8	Feb 21, 1975	Toronto, Ontario, Canada	
16	Win	9–6–1	Roberto Medina	SD	6	Oct 29, 1974	Four Seasons Arena, Walpole, Massachusetts, U.S.	
15	Loss	8–6–1	Rudy Bolds	KO	3 (10), 1:27	Sep 18, 1974	Monzo's Howard Johnson's, Monroeville, Pennsylvania, U.S.	
14	Win	8–5–1	Ron Pettigrew	KO	6 (?)	Aug 25, 1974	Dartmouth, Nova Scotia, Canada	
13	Win	7–5–1	Ron Pettigrew	TKO	6 (10)	Jul 24, 1974	Pierre Lafontaine Arena, Pointe-Gatineau, Canada	
12	Win	6–5–1	Cornell Hall	UD	8	Jul 3, 1974	Pierre Lafontaine Arena, Pointe-Gatineau, Canada	
11	Loss	5–5–1	Barry Sponagle	KO	7 (?)	Jun 15, 1974	Stellarton, Nova Scotia, Canada	
10	Win	5–4–1	Tony Johnson	SD	6	Jun 10, 1974	Cholette Arena, Hull, Canada	
9	Win	4–4–1	Eddie Heckbert	TKO	4 (6), 2:00	Apr 19, 1974	Robert Guertin Arena, Hull, Canada	
8	Loss	3–4–1	Jose Martinez	KO	4 (6)	Mar 5, 1974	Paul Sauvé Arena, Montreal, Canada	
7	Draw	3–3–1	Jo Jo Jackson	PTS	4	Oct 23, 1973	Paul Sauvé Arena, Montreal, Canada	
6	Loss	3–3	Jim Henry	KO	4 (?)	Aug 21, 1973	Paul Sauvé Arena, Montreal, Canada	
5	Loss	3–2	Jim Henry	KO	5 (6), 2:35	Jun 19, 1973	Sorel, Quebec, Canada	
4	Win	3–1	Pierre Deschenes	UD	6	May 7, 1973	Colisée de Québec, Quebec City, Canada	
3	Win	2–1	Royal Boutin	UD	6	Apr 30, 1973	Hull Arena, Hull, Canada	
2	Win	1–1	Tucker Harrigan	KO	2 (4)	Feb 19, 1973	Arena, Hull, Canada	
1	Loss	0–1	Paul Collette	KO	5 (6)	Dec 6, 1972	Hull Arena, Hull, Canada	
