= The Steak =

1992 Canadian documentary film

- French: Le Steak
- Directed by: Pierre Falardeau; Manon Leriche
- Produced by: Joanne Carrière
- Starring: Gaétan Hart
- Cinematography: Martin Leclerc
- Edited by: Werner Nold
- Music by: Robert Leriche
- Production company: National Film Board of Canada
- Release date: 1992
- Running time: 75 minutes
- Country: Canada
- Language: French

The Steak (French: Le Steak) is a Canadian documentary film, directed by Pierre Falardeau and Manon Leriche and released in 1992. The film is a portrait of former Canadian boxing champion Gaétan Hart, profiling both the ups and downs of his career in the 1970s and 1980s and his attempt to return to the sport in a 1990 fight.

The film's title was inspired by "A Piece of Steak", Jack London's 1909 short story about a retired boxer struggling with poverty.

The film received a Genie Award nomination for Best Feature Length Documentary at the 13th Genie Awards.
