= Henry Rhiney =

British former boxer (born 1951)

Personal information
- Nationality: British
- Born: 28 November 1951 (age 74)
- Weight: Welterweight

Boxing career

Boxing record
- Total fights: 57
- Wins: 32
- Win by KO: 9
- Losses: 19
- Draws: 6

Henry Rhiney (born 28 November 1951) is a British former boxer who was British welterweight champion between 1976 and 1979, and European champion between 1978 and 1979.

== Career ==
A car worker of Jamaican origin, Henry Rhiney made his professional debut in April 1973. He won most of his early fights but was beaten twice in 1974 by Pat Thomas. In February 1975 he lost to French champion Germain Le Maitre.

He won his first professional title in October 1976, stopping Mickey Ryce in the eighth round to become BBBofC Southern Area welterweight champion. Two months later he fought Thomas again for the latter's British title, avenging the earlier defeats with an eighth round stoppage to become British champion.

In 1977 he lost to Steve Angell and Thomas in non-title fights before making a successful defence of his British title in February 1978 against Billy Waith.

In December 1978 he challenged for Josef Pachler's European welterweight title in Dornbirn, Austria; Rhiney stopped Pachler in the tenth round to add the European title to his British belt. He made a defence of the European title in January 1979 against Dave Boy Green at the Royal Albert Hall, losing after Green stopped him in the fifth round.

In April 1979 he made a second defence of his British title against Kirkland Laing. Laing stopped him in the tenth round. Rhiney had four more fights, losing them all before retiring from boxing in 1980.

He subsequently relocated to Florida.
