= Bruno Arcari (boxer) =

Italian boxer (born 1942)

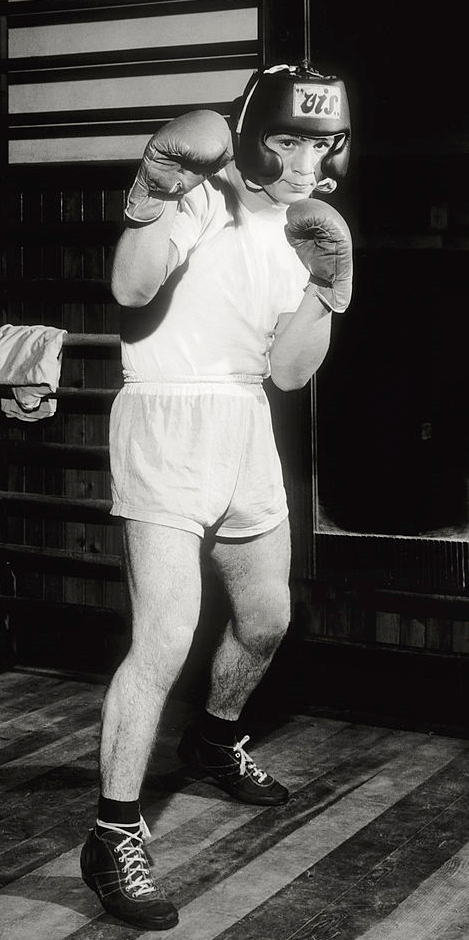
- Bruno Arcari in 1964

Personal information
- Nationality: Italian
- Born: 1 January 1942 (age 84) Atina, Lazio, Italy
- Height: 5 ft 5 in (165 cm)
- Weight: Light welterweight

Boxing career
- Reach: 66 1/2 in (169 cm)
- Stance: Southpaw

Boxing record
- Total fights: 73
- Wins: 70
- Win by KO: 38
- Losses: 2
- Draws: 1
Medal record
Men's Boxing
Representing Italy
European Amateur Championships
Bronze medal – third place	1963 Moscow	Light welterweight
Mediterranean Games
Gold medal – first place	1963 Naples	Light Welterweight

Bruno Arcari (born 1 January 1942) is a retired Italian light welterweight boxer who fought from 1964 to 1978.

== Biography ==
He came to the 1964 Olympics as a national champion and a bronze medalist of the 1963 European Championships, but was injured in the opening bout and had to withdraw. After that, he turned professional and again lost his first match by injury. He had only one loss further in his career, also by injury, and won 70 bouts, 38 of them by knockout. Arcari held the European title in 1968 by beating Austrian boxer Johann Orsolics via a twelfth-round stoppage. He would go on to defend the title four times. On 31 January 1970 captured the WBC world title after defeating Filipino boxer Pedro Adigue via a unanimous decision victory. Acari would reign as champion for four years & defended his title 9 times including against Brazilian boxer Everaldo Costa Azevedo & Spanish boxer Antonio Ortiz. He relinquished it 1973 to move up to the welterweight class, but did not fight for a major title until his retirement in 1978. He later managed top professional fighters in Italy.

== Awards ==
On 7 May 2015, in the presence of the President of Italian National Olympic Committee (CONI), Giovanni Malagò, the Olympic Park of the Foro Italico in Rome got inaugurated, along Viale delle Olimpiadi, the Walk of Fame of Italian sport, consisting of 100 tiles that alphabetically report names of the most representative athletes in the history of Italian sport. On each tile is the name of the sportsperson, the sport in which they distinguished themselves and the logo of the Italian Olympic Committee. One of the tiles is dedicated to Bruno Arcari.

== Professional boxing record ==
73 fights	70 wins	2 losses
By knockout	38	2
By decision	26	0
By disqualification	6	0
Draws	1	

No.	Result	Record	Opponent	Type	Round	Date	Location	Notes
73	Win	70–2–1	Jesse Lara	TKO	5 (10)	7 Jul 1978	Genoa, Italy	
72	Win	69–2–1	Nelson Gomes	TKO	7 (10)	22 Dec 1977	Gallipoli, Italy	
71	Win	68–2–1	Justice Ortiz	PTS	10	22 Oct 1977	Torino, Italy	
70	Draw	67–2–1	Rocky Mattioli	MD	10	3 Apr 1976	Palasport di San Siro, Milan, Italy	
69	Win	67–2	David Love	KO	5 (10)	12 Dec 1975	Torino, Italy	
68	Win	66–2	Gaétan Hart	KO	1 (10)	10 May 1975	Genoa, Italy	
67	Win	65–2	Harold Weston	PTS	10	28 Feb 1975	Palazzo Dello Sport, Torino, Italy	
66	Win	64–2	Lawrence Hafey	PTS	10	13 Dec 1974	Milan, Italy	
65	Win	63–2	Papo Villa	PTS	10	8 Nov 1974	Milan, Italy	
64	Win	62–2	Raul Celestino Venerdini	TKO	6 (8)	14 Aug 1974	Cefalu, Italy	
63	Win	61–2	Doc McClendon	PTS	10	3 May 1974	Palazzetto dello Sport, Roma, Italy	
62	Win	60–2	Antonio Ortiz	DQ	8 (15)	16 Feb 1974	PalaRuffini, Torino, Italy	Retained WBC light-welterweight title
61	Win	59–2	Jørgen Hansen	KO	5 (15)	1 Nov 1973	K.B. Hallen, Copenhagen, Denmark	Retained WBC light-welterweight title
60	Win	58–2	Robert Gallois	PTS	10	2 Jun 1973	Stade Louis II, Fontvieille, Monaco	
59	Win	57–2	Chris Fernandez	UD	10	9 Mar 1973	Palazzetto dello Sport, Roma, Italy	
58	Win	56–2	Everaldo Costa Azevedo	UD	15	2 Dec 1972	PalaRuffini, Torino, Italy	Retained WBC light-welterweight title
57	Win	55–2	Chris Fernandez	TKO	8 (10)	13 Oct 1972	Roma, Italy	
56	Win	54–2	Joao dos Santos	PTS	10	8 Aug 1972	Fermo, Italy	
55	Win	53–2	Joao Henrique	KO	12 (15), 2:15	10 Jun 1972	Palazzo Dello Sport, Genoa, Italy	Retained WBC light-welterweight title
54	Win	52–2	Jose Peterson	DQ	4 (10)	28 Apr 1972	Bologna, Italy	
53	Win	51–2	Al Romano	KO	4 (10)	24 Mar 1972	Torino, Italy	
52	Win	50–2	Percy Pugh	KO	5 (10)	4 Feb 1972	Palazzo Dello Sport, Torino, Italy	
51	Win	49–2	David Ham	TKO	5 (10), 2:45	17 Dec 1971	Torino, Italy	
50	Win	48–2	Domingo Barrera	KO	10 (15)	9 Oct 1971	Palazzo Dello Sport, Genoa, Italy	Retained WBC light-welterweight title
49	Win	47–2	Ruben Arocha	PTS	10	29 Jul 1971	Genoa, Italy	
48	Win	46–2	Enrique Jana	TKO	9 (15), 0:45	26 Jun 1971	Palazzetto dello Sport, Palermo, Italy	Retained WBC light-welterweight title
47	Win	45–2	Leonardo Dessi'	TKO	4 (10)	19 May 1971	Ancona, Italy	
46	Win	44–2	Joao Henrique	UD	15	6 Mar 1971	Palazzetto dello Sport, Roma, Italy	Retained WBC light-welterweight title
45	Win	43–2	Joao dos Santos	PTS	10	26 Dec 1970	Roma, Italy	
44	Win	42–2	Raimundo Dias	KO	3 (15), 1:45	30 Oct 1970	Palazzo Dello Sport, Genoa, Italy	Retained WBC light-welterweight title
43	Win	41–2	Carlos Almeida	TKO	3 (10), 1:25	28 Sep 1970	Bologna, Italy	
42	Win	40–2	Rene Roque	DQ	6 (15), 1:29	10 Jul 1970	Stadio Beach, Lignano Sabbiadoro, Italy	Retained WBC light-welterweight title
41	Win	39–2	Joao dos Santos	PTS	10	5 Jun 1970	Marseille, France	
40	Win	38–2	Bunny Grant	UD	10	10 Apr 1970	Palazzetto dello Sport, Roma, Italy	
39	Win	37–2	Pedro Adigue Jr.	PTS	15	31 Jan 1970	Palazzetto dello Sport, Roma, Italy	Won WBC light-welterweight title
38	Win	36–2	Kid Rainbow	TKO	2 (10)	19 Dec 1969	Torino, Italy	
37	Win	35–2	Jose Luis Torcida	KO	5 (15)	1 Dec 1969	Bologna, Italy	Retained EBU light-welterweight title
36	Win	34–2	Roger Evans	KO	6 (10)	4 Oct 1969	Stadio San Paolo, Napoli, Italy	
35	Win	33–2	Juan Albornoz	KO	6 (15)	13 Aug 1969	San Remo, Italy	Retained EBU light-welterweight title
34	Win	32–2	Floyd Bevens	KO	2 (10)	5 Jul 1969	Brescia, Italy	
33	Win	31–2	Bill Whittenburg	TKO	6 (10)	11 Jun 1969	Teatro Ariston, San Remo, Italy	
32	Win	30–2	Adrian Davis	DQ	4 (10)	13 Mar 1969	Palazzetto dello Sport, Roma, Italy	The referee DQ'd Davis for fighting with his head low
31	Win	29–2	Willi Quatuor	KO	7 (15), 2:42	24 Jan 1969	Roma, Italy	Retained EBU light-welterweight title
30	Win	28–2	Leon Zadourian	TKO	4 (10)	14 Dec 1968	Teatro Ariston, San Remo, Italy	
29	Win	27–2	Joe Tetteh	PTS	10	22 Nov 1968	La Spezia, Italy	
28	Win	26–2	Dave Wyatt	TKO	7 (10)	5 Oct 1968	Genoa, Italy	
27	Win	25–2	Des Rea	TKO	6 (15)	21 Aug 1968	Teatro Ariston, San Remo, Italy	Retained EBU light-welterweight title
26	Win	24–2	Fernand Simard	TKO	5 (10)	19 Jun 1968	Stadio Roli, Lavagna, Italy	
25	Win	23–2	Johann Orsolics	TKO	12 (15)	7 May 1968	Stadthalle, Vienna, Austria	Won EBU light-welterweight title
24	Win	22–2	Mickey Laud	TKO	6 (10)	6 Apr 1968	Genoa, Italy	
23	Win	21–2	Pablo Lopez	PTS	4	4 Mar 1968	Madison Square Garden, New York City, New York, US	
22	Win	20–2	Lex Hunter	PTS	8	5 Dec 1967	Milan, Italy	
21	Win	19–2	John White	TKO	4 (?)	11 Nov 1967	Genoa, Italy	
20	Win	18–2	Pietro Vargellini	TKO	4 (12)	6 Sep 1967	Acqui, Italy	Retained Italy light-welterweight title
19	Win	17–2	Romano Bianchi	RTD	1 (12)	5 Jul 1967	Arenzano, Italy	Retained Italy light-welterweight title
18	Win	16–2	Al Rocca	PTS	10	3 Jun 1967	Genoa, Italy	
17	Win	15–2	Angel Robinson Garcia	PTS	10	28 Apr 1967	Genoa, Italy	
16	Win	14–2	Efrem Donati	PTS	12	22 Feb 1967	Genoa, Italy	Retained Italy light-welterweight title
15	Win	13–2	Massimo Consolati	DQ	7 (12)	7 Dec 1966	Genoa, Italy	Won Italy light-welterweight title
14	Win	12–2	Luigi Braccini	TKO	6 (8)	21 Oct 1966	Palazzetto dello Sport, Roma, Italy	
13	Win	11–2	Quintino Soares	PTS	10	4 Oct 1966	Genoa, Italy	
12	Loss	10–2	Massimo Consolati	TKO	10 (12)	10 Aug 1966	Senigallia, Italy	For vacant Italy light-welterweight title
11	Win	10–1	Romano Bianchi	PTS	8	29 Apr 1966	Palazzetto dello Sport, Roma, Italy	
10	Win	9–1	Joe Brown	PTS	10	11 Mar 1966	Roma, Italy	
9	Win	8–1	Francesco Caruso	PTS	10	19 Jan 1966	Genoa, Italy	
8	Win	7–1	Julian Gonzalez	KO	4 (8)	23 Dec 1965	La Spezia, Italy	
7	Win	6–1	Ivan Whiter	TKO	4 (8)	3 Dec 1965	Palazzetto dello Sport, Roma, Italy	
6	Win	5–1	Efrem Donati	TKO	7 (8)	15 Oct 1965	Palazzetto dello Sport, Roma, Italy	
5	Win	4–1	Antonio Fernandes de Jesus	PTS	8	29 Aug 1965	Camerino, Italy	
4	Win	3–1	Nedo Stampi	DQ	3 (6)	23 Apr 1965	Palazzetto dello Sport, Roma, Italy	
3	Win	2–1	Salvatore Colella	TKO	3 (6)	3 Apr 1965	Genoa, Italy	
2	Win	1–1	Onorio Piras	KO	3 (6)	19 Feb 1965	Roma, Italy	
1	Loss	0–1	Franco Colella	TKO	5 (6)	11 Dec 1964	PalaEUR, Roma, Italy	

== See also ==
- List of world light-welterweight boxing champions

Sporting positions
Regional boxing titles
Preceded by Johann Orsolics	EBU Super-lightweight champion 7 May 1968 – 1970; Vacated	Vacant Title next held by Rene Roque
World boxing titles
Preceded by Pedro Adigue	WBC super lightweight champion 31 January 1970 – 1974; Vacated	Vacant Title next held by Perico Fernández
