= Domingo Barrera =

Spanish boxer (1943–2024)

Personal information
- Full name: Domingo Barrera Corpas
- Nationality: Spanish
- Born: 9 May 1943 Candelaria, Tenerife, Spain
- Died: 31 October 2024 (aged 81)

Sport
- Sport: Boxing

Domingo Barrera Corpas (9 May 1943 – 31 October 2024) was a Spanish boxer. He competed in the men's lightweight event at the 1964 Summer Olympics.

== Biography ==
Barrera fought Bruno Arcari for the Italian's World Boxing Council's world Junior Welterweight title on 8 October 1971 at Palazzo Dello Sport, Genoa, Italy. In what boxing website Boxrec calls "the most confusing, disorganized title boxing (match) in Italy", Barrera went down in round ten without getting hit by Arcari, who was about six feet away from the challenger. Barrera claimed he had been hit on a knee by a coin thrown from outside the boxing ring by a fan. Referee Teddy Waltham counted Barrera out, giving Arcari the knockout victory in the tenth round.

In 1971 also, he fought against Nicolino Locche ("The Untouchable"), being defeated.

Barrera retired after 50 professional boxing contests, compiling 40 wins and 10 losses, with 20 wins and 4 losses (the latter number including the Arcari fight) by way of knockout.

Barrera died on 31 October 2024, at the age of 81.
