= Les Pearson =

Les Pearson may refer to:

- Les Pearson (rugby league)
- Les Pearson (baseball)
