= Pat McCormack (boxer, born 1946) =

Irish boxer (1946-2012)

Personal information
- Nationality: Irish
- Born: 28 April 1946 Ireland
- Died: 15 February 2012 (aged 65) Dublin, Ireland
- Weight: Light welterweight, welterweight

Boxing career

Boxing record
- Total fights: 49
- Wins: 30
- Win by KO: 24
- Losses: 18
- Draws: 1

Pat McCormack (28 April 1946 – 15 February 2012) was a boxer who won the British light welterweight title in 1974.

== Career ==
Originally from Dublin and the son of Irish champion boxer Spike McCormack, Pat McCormack lived in Brixton and made his professional debut in June 1968, stopping Winston Thomas in the sixth round at the National Sporting Club. He won his first ten fights before suffering his first defeat in June 1969 to Ricky Porter.

In 1970 he beat Borge Krogh twice, and also beat Enzo Petriglia and Tommaso Marocco, but started 1971 with a loss to Johnny Gant at the Royal Albert Hall. He only won two fights that year, losing to the likes of Stoffel Steyn and Joe Tetteh.

In late 1972 and early 1973 he fought future European welterweight champion Joergen Hansen, losing the first and third contests but winning the second. In September 1973 he lost to Hector Thompson, but won his next three fights, leading to a challenge for Des Morrison's British light welterweight title in March 1974. McCormack knocked Morrison out in the eleventh round to become British champion.

McCormack made his first defence of the British title in November 1974 against Joey Singleton, losing a points decision.

He travelled to the United States in March 1975, where he was stopped in the seventh round by Tony Petronelli. He followed this with two fights in South Africa — a points loss to Gert Craemar and a fourth round knockout of Gielie Buitendag. Back in England he beat Billy Waith and Kevin White, and in December got the chance to win the (then vacant) British welterweight title when he faced Pat Thomas; The fight went thirteen of the scheduled fifteen rounds before Thomas knocked McCormack out. This proved to be McCormack's final fight.

McCormack returned to Dublin, where he ran the St Saviours Olympic Boxing Academy on Dorset Street with his brother John, who was also British champion at light heavyweight.

Pat McCormack died on 15 February 2012, aged 65, in Dublin.
