= Cleveland Denny =

Guyanese boxer

Cleveland Denny (died July 7, 1980) was a Guyanese boxer.

== Amateur career ==
Denny represented Guyana as a lightweight at the 1976 Olympic games. He did not compete due to his country boycotting the event over the inclusion of New Zealand. Denny technically had a first round bye, and lost to Bogdan Gajda of Poland on a walk-over.

== Pro career ==
Denny turned pro in 1976, fighting out of Montreal, and remained unbeaten in his first 11 pro fights, including a win over Jean LaPointe in 1977 for the Canadian lightweight title. He lost the belt the following year to Gaetan Hart by split decision. In a 10-round rematch on June 20, 1980, Denny was knocked out with 12 seconds left in the final round. Sportswriter David Johnston of the Gazette of Montreal wrote that "Late in the 10th round, Hart caught Denny with an uppercut as he pulled away, and charged in with a series of punches that shook his opponent. By the time Denny had slumped back against a ring post, the 67-year-old referee, Rosario Baillargeon, made a motion to stop the fight, but hesitated. Hart rushed past and hit Denny with about five more punches, sending him to the canvas, his jaw locked on his mouthpiece."

== Death ==
Denny died from injuries sustained in the bout with Hart in Montreal, 17 days after the fight. This match was on the undercard of the first Sugar Ray Leonard-Roberto Durán fight. Following his death, Denny's widow filed a lawsuit against Hart, the Montreal Athletic Commission, the Olympic Installations Board, and others.
