= Joey Singleton =

British boxer (born 1951)

Personal information
- Nickname: Joey The Jab Singleton
- Nationality: English
- Born: Joey Singleton; 6 June 1951 (age 75) Kirkby, Liverpool, England
- Weight: Light-welterweight; Welterweight

Boxing career
- Stance: Orthodox

Boxing record
- Total fights: 40
- Wins: 27
- Win by KO: 7
- Losses: 11
- Draws: 2

Joey "The Jab" Singleton (born 2 June 1951) is a former British professional boxer who competed from 1973 to 1982. He is a former British light-welterweight champion.

== Early life ==
Singleton was born on 2 June 1951 in, Liverpool, England. He won a full set of titles as a talented amateur fighter, including National Schools, Junior ABA and then senior ABA crown in 1971. He represented Britain a dozen times, winning gold medals at two multi-national tournaments before turning professional under revered fight guru Charles Atkinson.

== Professional career ==
Singleton made his professional debut on 27 March 1973, when he beat Barton McAllister on points. On 5 May, in his third professional bout, he beat Jess Harper for the vacant BBBofC central area light-welterweight title. On 21 November 1974, he beat Part McCormack for the British light-welterweight title. Singleton successfully retained the title twice, beating Alan Salter after the referee stopped the bout in the ninth round, due to a cut on Salter's left eyebrow, and then Des Morrison, beaten on points. On 1 June 1976, Singleton lost the title to Dave Boy Green after he was forced to retire from the bout, due to cuts over both eyes.

Singleton moved up to welterweight, and on 4 February 1980, beat Terry Peterson on points to claim the BBBofC central area welterweight title. On 17 April 1980, he challenged Jørgen Hansen for the European welterweight title, losing by a unanimous decision. On 26 October 1980 he successfully defended his central area welterweight title by beating Lee Hartshorn on points.

== Professional boxing record ==
40 fights	27 wins	11 losses
By knockout	7	5
By decision	20	6
Draws	2	

No.	Result	Record	Opponent	Type	Round, time	Date	Location	Notes
40	Loss	26–11–2	(Australia) Frank Ropis	RTD	6 (10)	17 Jun, 1982	(Australia) Dallas Brooks Hall, East Melbourne, Victoria	
39	Win	26–10–2	(United Kingdom) Cliff Gilpin	PTS	8	26 Apr, 1982	(United Kingdom) Elephant and Castle Centre, Southwark, London	
38	Win	25–10–2	(Netherlands) Cor Eversteijn	TKO	4 (10)	6 Mar, 1982	(Netherlands) Hilton Rotterdam, Rotterdam	
37	Win	24–10–2	(United Kingdom) Toney Martey	PTS	8	1 Feb, 1982	(United Kingdom) Elephant and Castle Centre, Southwark, London	
36	Win	23–10–2	(United Kingdom) Lee Hartshorn	PTS	8	17 Jul, 1981	(United Kingdom) Elephant and Castle Centre, Southwark, London	Retained BBBofC central area welterweight title
35	Draw	22–10–2	(Belgium) Frankie Decaestecker	PTS	8	17 Jul, 1981	(Belgium) Middelkerke	
34	Win	22–10–1	(United Kingdom) Sylvester Gordon	PTS	8	16 Feb, 1981	(United Kingdom) Elephant and Castle Centre, Southwark, London	
33	Loss	21–10–1	(United Kingdom) Lloyd Hibbert	PTS	8	21 Jan, 1981	(United Kingdom) Midland Sporting Club, Solihull	
32	Loss	21–9–1	(United Kingdom) Kirkland Laing	PTS	12	26 Nov, 1980	(United Kingdom) Midland Sporting Club, Solihull	
31	Win	21–8–1	(United Kingdom) Martyn Galleozzie	RTD	5 (8)	6 Oct, 1980	(United Kingdom) Elephant and Castle Centre, Southwark, London	
30	Loss	20–8–1	(Denmark) Jørgen Hansen	UD	10	17 Apr, 1980	(Denmark) Brøndbyhallen, Brøndby	For European welterweight title
29	Win	20–7–1	(United Kingdom) Terry Peterson	PTS	10	16 Oct, 1979	(United Kingdom) Cunard International Hotel, Hammersmith, London	For BBBofC Central Area welterweight title
28	Win	20–7–1	(United Kingdom) Achille Mitchell	PTS	8	16 Oct, 1979	(United Kingdom) Gala Baths, West Bromwich	
27	Win	19–7–1	(United Kingdom) Carl Bailey	PTS	8	24 Sep, 1979	(United Kingdom) Cunard International Hotel, Hammersmith, London	
26	Win	18–7–1	(United Kingdom) Sylvester Gordon	PTS	8	21 May 1979	(United Kingdom) Manor Place Baths, Walworth, London	
25	Win	17–7–1	(United Kingdom) Carl Bailey	PTS	8	24 Sep, 1979	(United Kingdom) Cunard International Hotel, Hammersmith, London	
24	Loss	16–7–1	(Denmark) Hans-Henrik Palm	PTS	8	15 Feb, 1979	(United Kingdom) Randers Hallen, Randers	
23	Win	16–6–1	(United Kingdom) Sylvester Gordon	PTS	8	15 Jan, 1979	(United Kingdom) Great International Sporting Club, Nottingham, Nottinghamshire	
22	Loss	15–6–1	(United Kingdom) Des Morrison	TKO	7 (10)	16 Nov, 1978	(United Kingdom) Liverpool International Sporting Club, Adelphi Hotel, Liverpool	
21	Win	15–5–1	(United Kingdom) Mick Bell	PTS	8	12 Oct, 1978	(United Kingdom) The Stadium, Liverpool	
20	Win	14–5–1	(United Kingdom) Kevin Davies	TKO	6 (8)	24 Apr, 1978	(United Kingdom) Manor Place Baths, Walworth, London	
19	Win	13–5–1	(United Kingdom) George McGurk	TKO	8 (8)	12 Apr, 1978	(United Kingdom) Cunard International Hotel, Hammersmith, London	
18	Win	12–5–1	(United Kingdom) Des Gwilliam	PTS	8	15 Mar, 1978	(United Kingdom) Midland Sporting Club, Solihull	
17	Win	11–5–1	(United Kingdom) Tommy Glencross	RTD	4 (8)	31 Jan, 1978	(United Kingdom) Regents Crest Hotel, Marylebone, London	
16	Loss	10–5–1	(United Kingdom) Colin Powers	PTS	8	6 Dec, 1976	(United Kingdom) Cunard International Hotel, Hammersmith, London	
15	Loss	10–4–1	(United Kingdom) George Turpin	PTS	8	18 Nov, 1976	(United Kingdom) The Stadium, Liverpool	
14	Loss	10–3–1	(United Kingdom) Charlie Nash	TKO	9 (12)	22 Sep, 1976	(United Kingdom) Midland Sporting Club, Solihull	
13	Loss	10–2–1	(United Kingdom) Dave Boy Green	RTD	6 (15)	1 Jun, 1976	(United Kingdom) Royal Albert Hall, Kensington, London	For British light-welterweight title
12	Draw	10–1–1	(France) Carlos Foldes	PTS	8	12 Apr, 1976	(United Kingdom) Paris	
11	Win	10–1	(United Kingdom) Des Morrison	PTS	15	11 Nov, 1975	(United Kingdom) Kings Hall, Belle Vue, Manchester	Retained British light-welterweight title
10	Win	9–1	(United Kingdom) Alan Salter	TKO	9 (15)	30 Sep, 1975	(United Kingdom) Empire Pool, Wembley, London	Retained British light-welterweight title
9	Win	8–1	(United Kingdom) Alan Salter	PTS	10	3 Jun, 1975	(United Kingdom) Royal Albert Hall, Kensington, London	
8	Win	7–1	(United Kingdom) Pat McCormack	PTS	15	21 Nov, 1974	(United Kingdom) The Stadium, Liverpool	For British light-welterweight title
7	Win	6–1	(United Kingdom) Jim Melrose	KO	2 (10)	5 Sep, 1974	(United Kingdom) The Stadium, Liverpool	Final eliminator British light-welterweight title
6	Win	5–1	(United Kingdom) Noel McIvor	PTS	8	18 Dec, 1973	(United Kingdom) Blackpool	
5	Loss	4–1	(United Kingdom) Jim Montague	TKO	8 (8)	26 Nov, 1973	(United Kingdom) Great International Sporting Club, Nottingham, Nottinghamshire	
4	Win	4–0	(United Kingdom) Jimmy Fairweather	PTS	10	1 Nov, 1973	(United Kingdom) The Stadium, Liverpool	
3	Win	3–0	(United Kingdom) Jess Harper	PTS	10	20 Sep, 1973	(United Kingdom) The Stadium, Liverpool	Won vacant BBBofC Central Area Light-welterweight title
2	Win	2–0	(United Kingdom) Angus McMillan	PTS	8	7 May 1973	(United Kingdom) Hilton Hotel, Mayfair, London	
1	Win	1–0	(United Kingdom) Barton McAllister	PTS	8	27 Mar, 1973	(United Kingdom) Royal Albert Hall, Kensington, London	Professional debut

== See also ==
- List of British light-welterweight boxing champions

Sporting positions
Regional boxing titles
Preceded by Pat McCormack	British light-welterweight champion 21 November 1974 – 1 June 1976	Succeeded by Dave Boy Green
