= Lloyd Christie =

British boxer (born 1962)

Personal information
- Nationality: British
- Born: Wesley Lloyd Christie; 28 February 1962 (age 64) London, England
- Weight: Light welterweight, welterweight

Boxing career
- Stance: Orthodox

Boxing record
- Total fights: 46
- Wins: 24
- Win by KO: 19
- Losses: 21
- Draws: 1

Wesley Lloyd Christie (born 28 February 1962), who fought as Lloyd Christie, is a British former boxer who was British light welterweight champion between 1987 and 1989 and also fought for the European title.

== Career ==
Born in London, the brother of Errol Christie, Lloyd Christie was based in Wolverhampton, and was managed and trained in Birmingham by Paddy and Tommy Lynch. He began his professional career in January 1981 with a first-round knockout of Steve Tempro. By the end of February 1984 he had won only half of his 28 fights, with one draw against Terry Marsh (the only fight of Marsh's career that he didn't win). In May 1984 he fought for his first title—the BBBofC Midlands Area welterweight title—losing on points to Kostas Petrou.

He won six of his next eight fights, losing only to Clinton McKenzie and African welterweight champion Judas Clottey, and in January 1987 challenged for Tony McKenzie's British light welterweight title. Christie stopped McKenzie in the third round to become British champion. Christie successfully defended the title in June against Mo Hussein and was due to make a second defence in October against Chris Blake but a sparring injury leaving Christie with his lip "split in half" and requiring 22 stitches caused a postponement to November. Christie stopped Blake in the first round but ended the year with a points defeat at the hands of Del Bryan in a non-title fight.

He was due to fight Joey Ferrell in January 1988 in what was seen at the time as an unofficial eliminator to challenge for Roger Mayweather's World title, but Ferrell withdrew, Christie getting a controversial points decision against substitute Tim Burgess.

In May 1988 Christie unsuccessfully challenged for Tusikoleta Nkalankete's European title in Paris, the champion stopping him in the sixth round.

In January 1989 he made a third defence of his British title against Clinton McKenzie, after original challenger and Scottish champion Robert Harkin was deemed not good enough to challenge for the title by the BBBofC; The fight went the full twelve rounds with McKenzie getting the decision by a single point. Christie was out of the ring until December 1989, when he lost to both Racheed Lawal and Crisanto España. He subsequently retired from boxing.
