= Des Rea =

Irish boxer (1944–2016)

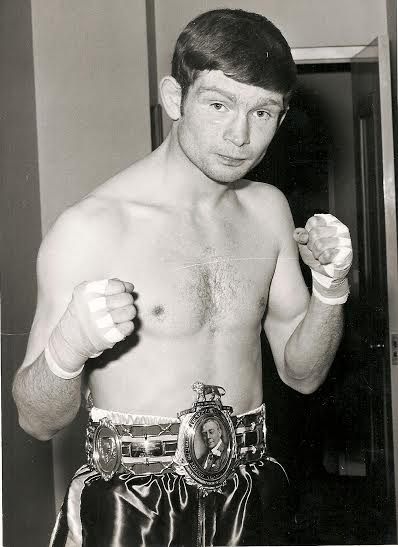
- Des Rea after winning the Lonsdale belt in 1968.

Personal information
- Nationality: British/Irish
- Born: Desmond Rea; 8 January 1944 Belfast, Northern Ireland
- Died: 21 July 2016 (aged 72) Barrowford, Lancashire, England, UK
- Weight: Light welterweight

Boxing career

Boxing record
- Total fights: 70
- Wins: 29
- Win by KO: 8
- Losses: 36
- Draws: 5

Desmond Rea (8 January 1944 – 21 July 2016) was a Northern Irish boxer who was the first holder of the British junior welterweight title and went on to fight for the European title before moving up to welterweight at which he won the Irish title. He was the first man in his weight group to be awarded the Lonsdale Belt.

== Career ==
Born in Belfast and raised in Liverpool, former cost accountant (for English Electric) Rea made his professional debut in November 1964 with a fifth round stoppage of Ken Hinds. He won eight of his first nine fights before beating Bob Sempey in September 1965 to take the vacant BBBofC Northern Ireland Area welterweight title. Over the next two years he had mixed results, winning five times but losing to Shaun Doyle, José Stable, Brian Curvis and Peter Cobblah. In February 1968 he faced Vic Andreetti for the newly created British light welterweight title at the York Hall, Bethnal Green; Rea took a points decision to become British champion.

In August 1968 he unsuccessfully challenged for Bruno Arcari's European title in Sanremo, Italy, Arcari stopping him in the sixth round. In November 1968 he travelled to the United States to face José Nápoles in a World title eliminator, losing via a fifth-round TKO. He defended his British title in February 1969 against Andreetti at the Nottingham Ice Rink; The fight again went the distance but Andreetti this time took the decision. The two met a third time eight months later, Andreetti this time retaining the title with a fourth round stoppage.

Rea moved up to welterweight and challenged for Gus Farrell's Irish title in February 1970, taking the title after knocking Farrell out in the eleventh round. Rea continued until 1974, having a further 39 fights but never again challenged for a title. Rea was associated with the Kray twins, whom he first met in 1967 and who he claims told him they would get him a British title fight, a European title fight and a world title eliminator, all of which later happened.

== Death ==
Rea died on 21 July 2016 at the age of 72.
