= Tony Laing (boxer) =

Jamaican/British boxer (born 1957)

Personal information
- Nationality: Jamaican/British
- Born: 22 September 1957 (age 68) Spanish Town, Jamaica
- Died: 30th August 2026 Nottingham, United Kingdom
- Height: 5 ft 7 in (170 cm)
- Weight: light welter/welter/light middleweight

Boxing career

Boxing record
- Total fights: 18
- Wins: 13 (KO 8)
- Losses: 4 (KO 4)
- Draws: 1

Tony Laing (born 22 September 1957) is a Jamaican/British professional light welter/welter/light middleweight boxer of the 1970s and '80s who won the British Boxing Board of Control (BBBofC) Midlands (England) Area light welterweight title, BBBofC British light welterweight title, Commonwealth light welterweight title, and was a challenger for the European Boxing Union (EBU) light welterweight title against Tusikoleta Nkalankete, his professional fighting weight varied from 137 1/4 lb (62.3 kg; 9 st 11.3 lb), i.e. light welterweight to 149 lb (68 kg; 10 st 9 lb), i.e. light middleweight.

Tony Laing is still situated in Nottingham and now trains young boxers across multiple gyms, in classes as well as one-on-one training.
