= Des Morrison (boxer) =

Jamaican/British boxer (born 1950)

Personal information
- Nationality: Jamaican/British
- Born: 1 February 1950 (age 76) Spanish Town, Jamaica
- Weight: Light welter/welter/light middleweight

Boxing career

Boxing record
- Total fights: 50
- Wins: 36 (KO 18)
- Losses: 12 (KO 5)
- Draws: 2

Des Morrison (born 1 February 1950) is a Jamaican/British professional light welter/welter/light middleweight boxer of the 1970s and 1980s who won the British Boxing Board of Control Southern (England) Area welterweight title, BBBofC British light welterweight title, and Commonwealth light welterweight title, and was a challenger for the BBBofC British light welterweight title against; Joey Singleton, Colin Powers, and Clinton McKenzie, and Commonwealth light welterweight title against Obisia Nwankpa, his professional fighting weight varied from 137 1/4 lb (62.3 kg; 9 st 11.3 lb), i.e. light welterweight to 148 lb (67 kg; 10 st 8 lb), i.e. light middleweight.
