= Boxing at the 1976 Summer Olympics – Light welterweight =

Olympic boxing tournament

Light welterweight boxing at the Games of the XXI Olympiad
- Venue: Maurice Richard Arena, Montreal
- Dates: 18–31 July 1976
- Competitors: 31 from 31 nations

Medalists
1st place, gold medalist(s)		Ray Leonard	United States
2nd place, silver medalist(s)		Andrés Aldama	Cuba
3rd place, bronze medalist(s)		Vladimir Kolev	Bulgaria
3rd place, bronze medalist(s)		Kazimierz Szczerba	Poland

The men's light welterweight event was part of the boxing programme at the 1976 Summer Olympics. The weight class allowed boxers of up to 63.5 kilograms to compete. The competition was held from 18 to 31 July 1976. 31 boxers from 31 nations competed.

== Medalists ==
Gold	Ray Leonard; United States
Silver	Andrés Aldama; Cuba
Bronze	Vladimir Kolev; Bulgaria
Bronze	Kazimierz Szczerba; Poland

== Results ==
The following boxers took part in the event:

Rank	Name	Country
1	Ray Leonard	United States
2	Andrés Aldama	Cuba
3T	Vladimir Kolev	Bulgaria
3T	Kazimierz Szczerba	Poland
5T	Calistrat Cuţov	Romania
5T	Luis Portillo	Argentina
5T	József Nagy	Hungary
5T	Ulrich Beyer	East Germany
9T	Syamsul Anwar Harahap	Indonesia
9T	Jesús Sánchez	Dominican Republic
9T	Sodnomyn Gombo	Mongolia
9T	Francisco de Jesus	Brazil
9T	Ernst Müller	West Germany
9T	Chris Clarke	Canada
9T	Christian Sittler	Austria
9T	Clinton McKenzie	Great Britain
17T	Jean-Claude Ruiz	France
17T	Park Tae-sik	South Korea
17T	Sabahattin Burcu	Turkey
17T	Jesús Navas	Venezuela
17T	Ismael Martínez	Puerto Rico
17T	Lasse Friman	Finland
17T	Narong Boonfuang	Thailand
17T	Valery Limasov	Soviet Union
25T	José Manuel Gómet	Spain
25T	Siergot Sully	Haiti
25T	Ulf Carlsson	Sweden
25T	Luis Godoy	Colombia
25T	Chand Machiah	India
25T	Daniele Zappaterra	Italy
25T	Robert Colley	New Zealand

=== First round ===
- Narong Boonfuang (THA) def. José Manuel Gómet (ESP), KO-1
- Christian Sittler (AUT) def. Luis Godoy (COL), 4:1
- Jesús Navas (VEN) def. Jones Okoth (UGA), walk-over
- Ulrich Beyer (GDR) def. C.C. Machaiah (IND), 5:0
- Francisco de Jesus (BRA) def. Girmaye Gabre (ETH), walk-over
- Philip Mathenge (KEN) – Hamidou Yagho (BUR), both walk-over
- Ismael Martínez (PUR) def. Siergot Sully (HAI), 5:0
- Clinton McKenzie (GBR) def. Daniele Zappaterra (ITA), 5:0
- Ray Leonard (USA) def. Ulf Carlsson (SWE), 5:0
- Valeri Limasov (URS) def. Robert Colley (NZL), DSQ-3

=== Second round ===
- Calistrat Cuțov (ROM) def. Jean-Claude Ruiz (FRA), 5:0
- Jamsul Harahap (INA) def. Moro Tahiru (GHA), walk-over
- Vladimir Kolev (BUL) def. Tai Shik-Park (KOR), 5:0
- Ernst Müller (FRG) def. Karim Ibrahim (NIG), walk-over
- Andrés Aldama (CUB) def. Sabahattin Bürçü (TUR), RSC-2
- Jesus Sánchez (DOM) def. Mark Harris (GUY), walk-over
- József Nagy (HUN) def. Obisia Nwakpa (NGA), walk-over
- Chris Clarke (CAN) def. Lasse Friman (FIN), 5:0
- Sodnomyn Gombo (MGL) def. Messan Langhan (TOG), walk-over
- Kazimierz Szczerba (POL) def. Josiah Nhlengethwa (SUA), walk-over
- Luis Portillo (ARG) def. Farouk Chanchoun (IRQ), walk-over
- Christian Sittler (AUT) def. Narong Boonfuang (THA), KO-2
- Ulrich Beyer (GDR) def. Jesús Navas (VEN), 5:0
- Francisco de Jesus (BRA) – no opponent (bye)
- Clinton McKenzie (GBR) def. Ismael Martínez (PUR), 3:2
- Ray Leonard (USA) def. Valeri Limasov (URS), 5:0

=== Third round ===
- Calistrat Cuțov (ROM) def. Jamsul Harahap (INA), 5:0
- Vladimir Kolev (BUL) def. Ernst Müller (FRG), 5:0
- Andrés Aldama (CUB) def. Jesus Sánchez (DOM), RSC-2
- József Nagy (HUN) def. Chris Clarke (CAN), RSC-3
- Kazimierz Szczerba (POL) def. Sodnomyn Gombo (MGL), 3:2
- Luis Portillo (ARG) def. Christian Sittler (AUT), KO-2
- Ulrich Beyer (GDR) def. Francisco de Jesus (BRA), 5:0
- Ray Leonard (USA) def. Clinton McKenzie (GBR), 5:0

=== Quarterfinals ===
- Vladimir Kolev (BUL) def. Calistrat Cuțov (ROM), 5:0
- Andrés Aldama (CUB) def. József Nagy (HUN), AB-2
- Kazimierz Szczerba (POL) def. Luis Portillo (ARG), 5:0
- Ray Leonard (USA) def. Ulrich Beyer (GDR), 5:0

=== Semifinals ===
- Andrés Aldama (CUB) def. Vladimir Kolev (BUL), KO-1
- Ray Leonard (USA) def. Kazimierz Szczerba (POL), 5:0

=== Final ===
- Ray Leonard (USA) def. Andrés Aldama (CUB), 5:0
