= Andrés Aldama =

Cuban boxer (born 1956)

Personal information
- Full name: Andrés Aldama Cabrera
- Nationality: Cuba
- Born: April 9, 1956 (age 70) Matanzas, Matanzas Province
- Height: 1.83 m (6 ft 0 in)
- Weight: 63 kg (139 lb)

Sport
- Sport: Boxing
- Weight class: Welterweight
Medal record
Olympic Games
Gold medal – first place	1980 Moscow	Welterweight
Silver medal – second place	1976 Montreal	Light Welterweight
Pan American Games
Gold medal – first place	1979 San Juan	Welterweight

Andrés Aldama Cabrera (born April 9, 1956) is a retired amateur Cuban boxer, who won the light welterweight silver medal at the 1976 Summer Olympics and the Welterweight gold medal at the 1980 Summer Olympics.

Aldama defeated John Mugabi of Uganda to win the 1980 gold medal, and lost to Sugar Ray Leonard of the United States to receive the 1976 silver medal. In 1979 he won a gold medal at the Pan American Games, defeating Mike McCallum of Jamaica in the welterweight final.

== Olympic results ==
Below are the Olympic results of Andres Aldama, a Cuban boxer who competed in the 1976 Montreal Olympics as a light welterweight and in the 1980 Moscow Olympics as a welterweight:

Montreal - 1976

- Round of 64: 1st round bye
- Round of 32: Defeated Sabahattin Burcu (Turkey) referee stopped contest in round #2
- Round of 16: Defeated Jesus Sánchez (Dominican Republic) referee stopped contest in round #2
- Quarterfinal: Defeated József Nagy (Hungary) TKO 2
- Semifinal: Defeated Vladimir Kolev (Bulgaria) KO 1
- Final: Lost to Sugar Ray Leonard (United States) by decision, 0-5 (was awarded silver medal)

Moscow - 1980

- Round of 32: Defeated Pierre Sotoumey (Benin) TKO 3
- Round of 16: Defeated Israel Akopkokhyan (Soviet Union) by decision, 3–2
- Quarterfinal: Defeated Plamen Yankov (Bulgaria) KO 3
- Semifinal: Defeated Karl-Heinz Krüger (East Germany) by decision, 5–0
- Final: Defeated John Mugabi (Uganda) by decision, 4-1 (was awarded gold medal)
