= Kazimierz Szczerba =

Polish boxer

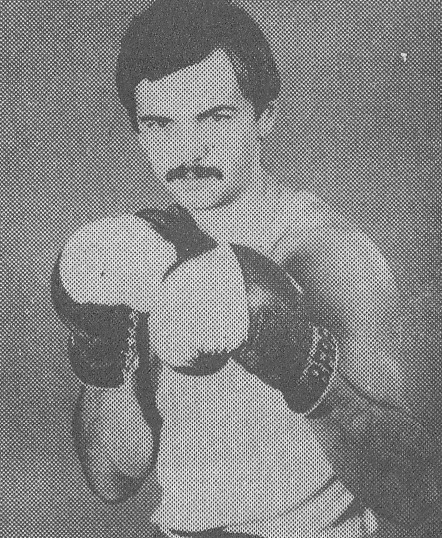

Medal record

Men's Boxing
Bronze medal – third place	1976 Montreal	Light Welterweight
Bronze medal – third place	1980 Moscow	Welterweight

Kazimierz Wiesław Szczerba (born 4 March 1954 in Ciężkowice) is a Polish former amateur boxer who won a Light Welterweight Bronze medal at the 1976 Summer Olympics and a Welterweight Bronze medal at the 1980 Summer Olympics.

In 1976, Szczerba lost on points to eventual gold medal winner Sugar Ray Leonard of the United States. In 1980, he lost on points to John Mugabi of Uganda in the semifinals.

- Defeated Kebede Sahilu (Ethiopia) 5–0
- Defeated Ionel Budusan (Romania) TKO 2
- Lost to John Mugabi (Uganda) 2–3
