= Christian Sittler =

Austrian boxer

Personal information
- Nationality: Austrian
- Born: 26 February 1954 (age 71); Vienna, Austria

Sport
- Sport: Boxing

Christian Sittler (born 26 February 1954) is an Austrian boxer. He competed in the men's light welterweight event at the 1976 Summer Olympics. At the 1976 Summer Olympics, he defeated Luis Godoy and Narong Boonfuang, before losing to Luis Portillo in the last sixteen.
