= Joseph Frost (boxer) =

British boxer

Personal information
- Full name: Joseph Michael Frost
- Nickname: Joey
- Nationality: British
- Born: 14 July 1960 (age 66) Liverpool, England

Sport
- Sport: Boxing

Joseph Michael Frost (born 14 July 1960) is a British boxer. He competed in the men's welterweight event at the 1980 Summer Olympics.

== Early life and amateur career ==
Frost was born in Liverpool, England, where he still resides to this day. At the age of 10 he started amateur boxing winning 269 out of 287 fights.

=== ABA Welterweight Championship ===
At the age of 19 in 1979 he won the ABA Welterweight Championship beating Lloyd Honeyghan in the semi-finals who later became the WBA world champion. In the finals he KO'd Alan Mann in the first round making it last only 15 seconds.

=== 1980 Summer Olympics ===
In 1980 he competed in the men's welterweight 1980 Summer Olympics defeating Outsana Dao and Peter Talanti but then losing to german boxer Karl-Heinz Krüger in the quarter-finals.

== Professional career ==
Frost turned professional in 1981 with fighting Kevin Walsh winning first round KO marking his first win.

== Professional boxing record ==
11 fights	9 wins	2 losses
By knockout	7	2
By decision	2	0

No.	Result	Record	Opponent	Type	Date	Location	Notes
11	Win	9-2	(United Kingdom) Phil O'Hare	KO	Jun 15, 1984	(United Kingdom) Liverpool Stadium, Liverpool, England, UK.	
10	Win	8–2	(United Kingdom) Lee Hartshorn	TKO	Feb 24, 1983	(United Kingdom) Liverpool Stadium, Liverpool, England, UK.	Retained BBBofC Central Area Welter Title
9	Loss	7–2	(United Kingdom) Lloyd Christie	TKO	Jan 24, 1983	(United Kingdom) Yorkshire Executive S.C., Bradford, England, UK.	
8	Win	7–1	(United Kingdom) Peter Bennett	TKO	Nov 25, 1982	(United Kingdom) Town Hall, Morley, England, UK.	Won vacant BBBofC Central Area Welter Title
7	Loss	6–1	(United Kingdom) Dave Douglas	TKO	Jun 24, 1982	(United Kingdom) Sports Centre, Kirkby, England, UK.	
6	Win	6-0	(United Kingdom) Tommy McCallum	TKO	May 20, 1982	(United Kingdom) Guild Hall, Preston, England, UK.	
5	Win	5-0	(United Kingdom) Horace McKenzie	PTS	May 20, 1982	(United Kingdom) Guild Hall, Preston, England, UK.	
4	Win	4-0	(United Kingdom) Nigel Thomas	KO	Dec 21, 1981	(United Kingdom) Yorkshire Executive S.C., Bradford, England, UK.	
3	Win	3-0	(United Kingdom) Chris Coady	PTS	Oct 13, 1981	(United Kingdom) Tower Circus, Blackpool, England, UK.	
2	Win	2-0	(United Kingdom) Jeff Aspell	TKO	Sep 28, 1981	(United Kingdom) Yorkshire Executive S.C., Bradford, England, UK.	
1	Win	1-0	(United Kingdom) Kevin Walsh	KO	Sep 24, 1981	(United Kingdom) Liverpool Stadium, Liverpool, England, UK.	
