= Robert Colley (boxer) =

New Zealand boxer (born 1954)

Medal record

Representing New Zealand

Men's Boxing

Commonwealth Games
Bronze medal – third place	1974 Christchurch	Lightweight

Robert Charles Colley (born 10 November 1954, in Christchurch) is a retired boxer from New Zealand who won the bronze medal in the Lightweight (-60 kg) division at the 1974 Commonwealth Games in his home town. He also competed at the 1976 Summer Olympics in Montreal.

== 1976 Olympics ==
Colley competed at the 1976 Summer Olympics in Montreal. He lost by disqualification in the first round of competition to Valery Limasov of the Soviet Union in the third round of their bout.
