= Chris Clarke (boxer) =

Canadian boxer (born 1956)

Personal information
- Nationality: Canadian
- Born: Chris Clarke; October 24, 1956 (age 69) Halifax, Nova Scotia, Canada
- Height: 5 ft 8 in (173cm)
- Weight: Welterweight; Middleweight

Boxing career
- Stance: Southpaw

Boxing record
- Total fights: 33
- Wins: 29
- Win by KO: 17
- Losses: 4
Medal record
Men's Boxing
Representing Canada
Pan American Games
Gold medal – first place	1975 Mexico City	Lightweight

Chris Clarke (born October 24, 1956, in Halifax, Nova Scotia) is a former professional boxer from Canada, who won the Canadian and Commonwealth Welterweight championship titles and also became the Canadian Middleweight champion. As an amateur boxer, Clarke won the gold medal in the men's lightweight division at the 1975 Pan American Games. A year later he represented his native country at the 1976 Summer Olympics, where he was defeated in the second round.

== Amateur boxing career ==
Growing up in North End, Halifax, Chris Clarke began boxing at 10.

In February 1975, he won a gold medal in the 125-pound division at the 1975 Canada Winter Games in Lethbridge, Alberta.

He soon became a two-time national champion, winning the Canadian amateur boxing championships of June 1975 in Montreal, and May 1976 in Sudbury.

=== 1975 Pan American Games results ===
Chris Clarke represented Team Canada in the men's lightweight division at the 1975 Pan American Games. His defeat of Aaron Pryor in the finals made him the first Canadian boxer to ever win a gold medal at the Pan American Games.

=== 1976 Summer Olympics results ===
Below are the results of Chris Clarke, a light welterweight (139) boxer on Canada's Olympic boxing team who competed at the Montreal 1976 Summer Olympics:

- Round of 64: bye.
- Round of 32: defeated Lasse Friman (Finland) on points, 5-0.
- Round of 16: lost to Jozsef Nagy (Hungary) referee stopped the contest in the third round.

He finished his amateur career with a record of 94–6.

== Professional boxing career ==
After losing by a controversial headbutt at the 1976 Summer Olympics, Clarke began his professional boxing career in November 1976. He started out with eleven stoppages in his first eleven bouts. By 1977, the Canadian Professional Boxing Federation ranked Clarke second in the welterweight division after champion Guerrero Chavez and Clyde Gray.

At 21, he captured the Commonwealth Boxing Council welterweight title with an 11th-round TKO of Clyde Gray on August 28, 1979. He lost in the rematch to Gray a few months later.

He soon shifted from the welterweight to the middleweight division. He beat former Canadian middleweight champion Lawrence Hafey in June 1979.

In April 1980, he became the Canadian middleweight champion by defeating Ralph Hollett in a title fight held at the Halifax Metro Centre. He lost the title to Hollett in their September rematch.

The 25-year-old former titleholder returned to the ring in 1982, managed by Jerry Fraser and trained by Art Hafey.

In November 1986, he scored a ten-round decision win over undefeated Donovan Boucher. Clarke, at age 30, had worked his way back into the Canadian rankings after earlier setbacks that cost him the Commonwealth welterweight and Canadian middleweight titles in the late 1970s. He had lined himself up for a shot at Ricky Anderson's welterweight title in May 1987, which fell through after Anderson's retirement.

He faced 15-1 Shawn O'Sullivan of Toronto in a non-title bout dubbed the "Brawl for it all" on September 29, 1987. Clarke's number one ranking among Canadian welterweights was put on the line. After suffering a second-round knockout loss, the Halifax native retired in the ring.

Chris Clarke was inducted into the Nova Scotia Sport Hall of Fame in 2006.

== Professional boxing record ==
33 fights	29 wins	4 losses
By knockout	17	4
By decision	12	0
Draws	0	

== Honors and awards ==
- 1975 Canada Winter Games Gold Medalist
- 1975 Canadian National Amateur Boxing Champion
- 1975 Pan American Games Gold Medalist
- 1976 Two-time Canadian National Amateur Boxing Champion
- 1976 Summer Olympics Team Canada member
- 1979 Commonwealth Boxing Council Welterweight Champion
- 1980 Canadian Middleweight Champion
- Canadian Boxing Hall of Fame inductee
- 2006 Nova Scotia Sport Hall of Fame inductee
