= Csjef =

Csjef is a surname. Notable people with the surname include:

- Imre Csjef (born 1960), Hungarian boxer
- Sándor Csjef (1950–2016), Hungarian boxer
