= Sugar Ray Leonard =

American boxer (born 1956)

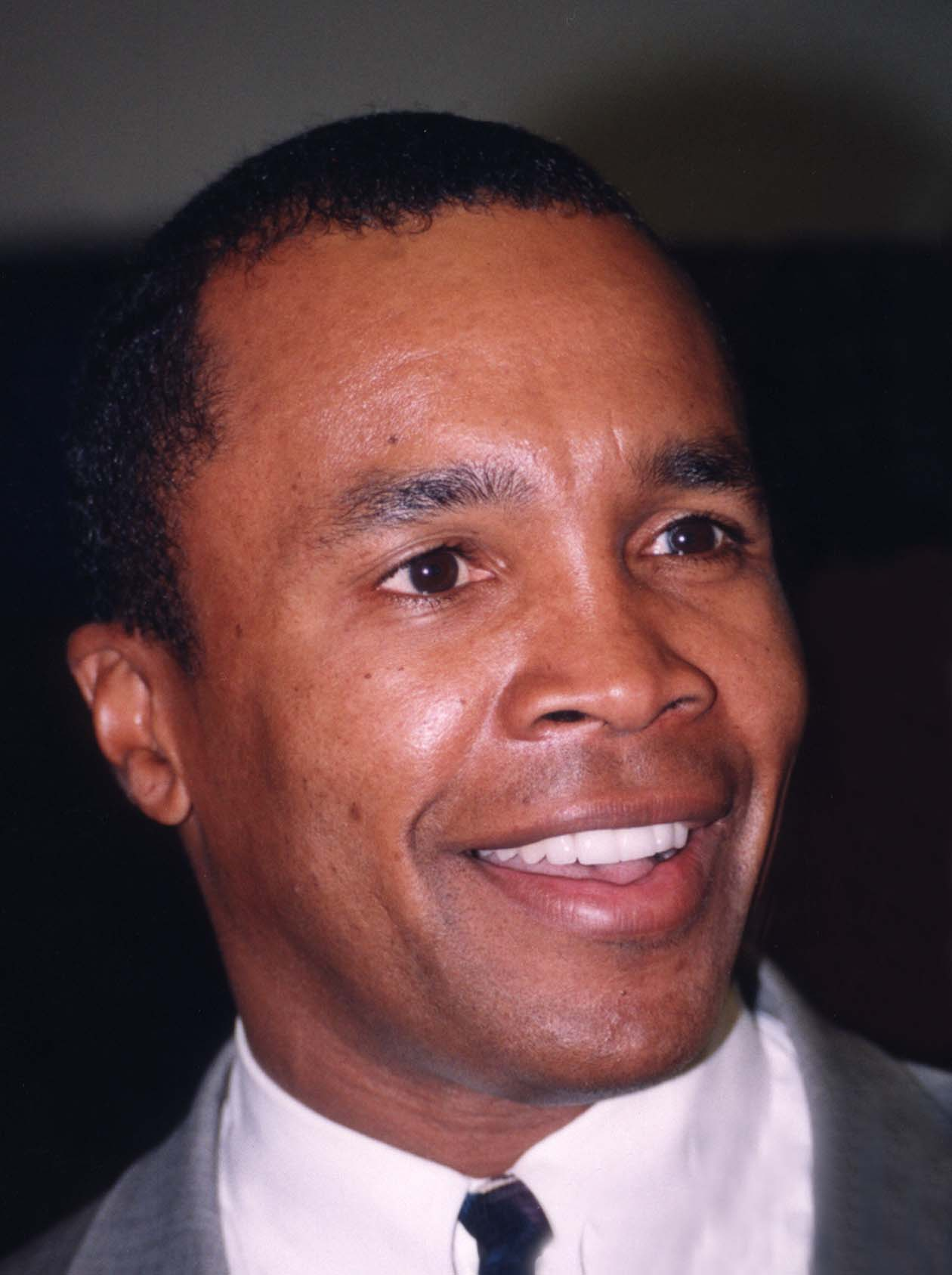
- Leonard in 1998

Personal information
- Nickname: Sugar
- Born: Ray Charles Leonard; May 17, 1956 (age 70) Wilmington, North Carolina, U.S.
- Height: 5 ft 10 in (178 cm)
- Weight: Welterweight; Light middleweight; Middleweight; Super middleweight; Light heavyweight

Boxing career
- Reach: 74 in (188 cm)
- Stance: Orthodox

Boxing record
- Total fights: 40
- Wins: 36
- Win by KO: 25
- Losses: 3
- Draws: 1
Medal record
Men's amateur boxing
Representing United States
Olympic Games
Gold medal – first place	1976 Montreal	Light welterweight
Pan American Games
Gold medal – first place	1975 Mexico City	Light welterweight

Ray Charles Leonard (born May 17, 1956), better known as Sugar Ray Leonard, is an American former professional boxer. Often regarded as one of the greatest boxers of all time, he competed professionally between 1976 and 1997, winning world titles in five weight classes; the lineal championship in three weight classes; as well as the undisputed welterweight championship. Leonard was part of the "Four Kings", a group of boxers who all fought each other throughout the 1980s, consisting of Leonard, Roberto Durán, Thomas Hearns, and Marvin Hagler. Leonard was the only one of them to beat the other three. As an amateur, Leonard won a light welterweight gold medal at the 1976 Summer Olympics.

The "Four Kings" created a wave of popularity in the lower weight classes that kept boxing relevant in the post-Muhammad Ali era, during which Leonard defeated future fellow International Boxing Hall of Fame inductees Hearns, Durán, Hagler, and Wilfred Benítez. Leonard was also the first boxer to earn more than $100 million in purses, and was named "Boxer of the Decade" in the 1980s. The Ring magazine named him Fighter of the Year in 1979 and 1981, while the Boxing Writers Association of America named him Fighter of the Year in 1976, 1979, and 1981. He was honored as the Sports Illustrated Sportsman of the Year in 1981. In 2002, Leonard was voted by The Ring as the ninth greatest fighter of the last 80 years. In 2016, he was voted by The Ring to be the greatest living fighter.

Outside his professional boxing career, Leonard has worked as a boxing analyst and actor, appearing in numerous television shows and films, including Half & Half, L.A. Heat, Married... with Children, Renegade, Tales from the Crypt, I Spy (2002), and The Fighter (2010).

== Early life ==
Leonard, the fifth of seven children of Cicero and Getha Leonard, was born in Wilmington, North Carolina. He was named after Ray Charles, his mother's favorite singer. The family moved to Washington, D.C., when he was three, and they settled permanently in Palmer Park, Maryland when he was ten. His father worked as a supermarket night manager and his mother was a nurse. He attended Parkdale High School. Leonard was a shy child, and aside from the time he nearly drowned in a creek during a flood in Seat Pleasant, Maryland, his childhood was uneventful. He stayed home a lot, reading comic books and playing with his dog. His mother said: "He never did talk too much. We never could tell what he was thinking. But I never had any problems with him. I never had to go to school once because of him."

== Amateur career ==
Leonard started boxing at the Palmer Park Recreation Center in 1969. His older brother, Roger, started boxing first. Roger helped start the boxing program, urging the center's director, Ollie Dunlap, to form a team. Dave Jacobs, a former boxer, and Janks Morton volunteered as boxing coaches. Roger won some trophies and showed them off in front of Ray, goading him to start boxing.

In 1972, Leonard boxed in the featherweight quarterfinals of the National AAU Tournament, losing by decision to Jerome Artis. It was his first defeat. Later that year, he boxed in the Eastern Olympic Trials. The rules stated that a boxer had to be seventeen to box in international competition, so Leonard, only sixteen, lied about his age. He made it to the lightweight semi-finals, losing a disputed decision to Greg Whaley, who took such a beating that he wasn't allowed to continue in the trials and never boxed again.

Sarge Johnson, assistant coach of the US Olympic Boxing Team, said to Dave Jacobs, "That kid you got is sweet as sugar". The nickname stuck. However, given his style and first name, it was probably only a matter of time before people started calling him Sugar Ray, after the man many consider to be the greatest boxer of all time, Sugar Ray Robinson.

In 1973, Leonard won the National Golden Gloves Lightweight Championship but lost to Randy Shields in the lightweight final of the US National Championships. The following year, Leonard won the National Golden Gloves and US National Championships at light welterweight. Leonard suffered his last two losses as an amateur in 1974. He lost a disputed decision to Anatoli Kamnev in Moscow, after which, Kamnev gave the winner's trophy to Leonard. In Poland, local fighter Jan Kwacz was given a disqualification victory over Leonard after being knocked down three times in the first round but the referee ruled that Leonard had punched after the bell.

In 1975, Leonard again won the US National Championships at light welterweight, as well as the Light Welterweight Championship at the Pan American Games.

In 1976, Leonard made the U.S. Olympic Team as the light welterweight representative. The team also included Leon and Michael Spinks, Howard Davis Jr., Leo Randolph, Charles Mooney, and John Tate. Many consider the 1976 U.S. team to be the greatest boxing team in the history of the Olympics. Leonard won his first four Olympic bouts by 5–0 decisions. In the semi-finals, he faced Kazimierz Szczerba and won a 5–0 decision.

In the final, Leonard boxed the great Cuban knockout artist Andrés Aldama, who scored five straight knockouts to reach the final and would go on to win the gold medal at the 1980 Summer Olympics. Leonard landed several good left hooks in the first round. In the second, he dropped Aldama with a left to the chin. Late in the final round, he again hurt Aldama, which brought a standing eight count from the referee.

With only a few seconds left in the fight, a Leonard combination forced another standing eight count. Leonard was awarded a 5–0 decision and the Olympic gold medal. Afterward, Leonard announced, "I'm finished...I've fought my last fight. My journey has ended, my dream is fulfilled. Now I want to go to school." He was given a scholarship to the University of Maryland, a gift from the citizens of Glenarden, Maryland. He planned to study business administration and communications. He finished his amateur career with a record of 165–5 and 75 KOs.

=== Achievements ===
- 1973 National Golden Gloves Lightweight Champion, defeating Hilmer Kenty
- 1973 National AAU Light Welterweight Championship runner-up, losing to Randy Shields
- 1974 National Golden Gloves Light Welterweight Champion, defeating Jeff Lemeir
- 1974 National AAU Light Welterweight Champion, defeating Paul Sherry
- 1974 North American Championships Gold Medalist, defeating Robert Proulx
- 1975 National AAU Light Welterweight Champion, defeating Milton Seward
- 1975 North American Championships Gold Medalist, defeating Michel Briere
- 1975 Pan American Games Light Welterweight Gold Medalist, defeating Victor Corona from Cuba
- 1976 Olympic Light Welterweight Gold Medalist, defeating Andrés Aldama, also from Cuba.

Olympic results

- 1/32: Defeated Ulf Carlsson (Sweden) by unanimous decision, 5–0
- 1/16: Defeated Valery Limasov (Soviet Union) by unanimous decision, 5–0
- 1/8: Defeated Clinton McKenzie (Great Britain) by unanimous decision, 5–0
- 1/4: Defeated Ulrich Beyer (East Germany) by unanimous decision, 5–0
- 1/2: Defeated Kazimierz Szczerba (Poland) by unanimous decision, 5–0
- Finals: Defeated Andrés Aldama by unanimous decision, 5–0

== Change of plans ==
Juanita Wilkinson, Leonard's high school girlfriend, told him she was pregnant in the summer of 1973. They decided to have the baby but marriage would be put off until after the Olympics in 1976. Leonard would continue to pursue his Olympic dream while she and the baby, Ray Charles Leonard Jr., lived with her parents. When Leonard boxed in the Olympics, he had a picture of Wilkinson taped to his sock.

Shortly before the Olympics, Wilkinson had filed an application to receive $156 a month in child support payments from Prince George's County, Maryland. She named Leonard as the father and the county's state attorney's office filed a civil suit against Leonard to establish paternity and get support payments for the child. Leonard learned of the suit several days after returning home from the Olympics. The headline in the Washington Star read, "Sugar Ray Leonard Named in Welfare Dept. Paternity Suit".

Wilkinson went to the Olympics to watch Leonard box, but she did not tell him about the suit and never asked him for any money. "I didn't feel like being bothered by all those complications by asking him for any money for support", she said. Leonard pledged he would support his son, even if he had to scrap plans to attend college.

Leonard had hoped to get lucrative endorsements following his gold medal win, but the negative publicity from the paternity suit chased off any big commercial possibilities. To make matters worse, his father was hospitalized with meningitis and his mother had a heart attack. With neither parent able to work, with his child and the mother of his child to support, and without any endorsement opportunities, Leonard decided to become a professional boxer.

== Professional career ==
=== Early professional career ===
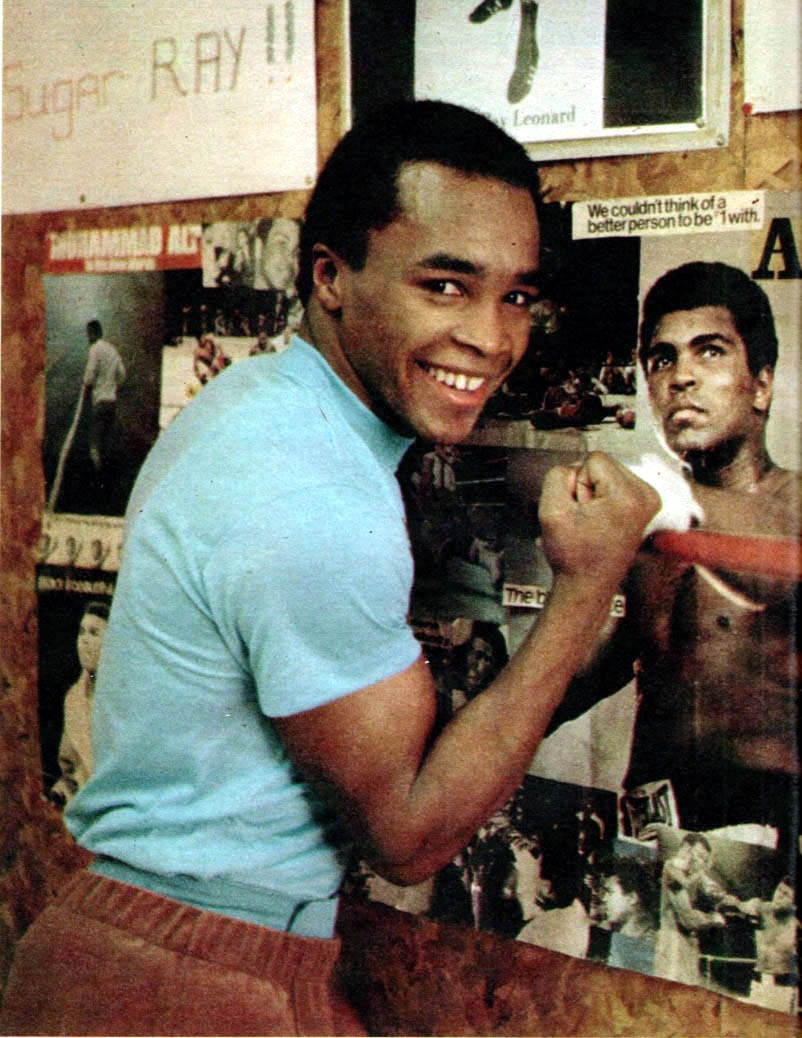
Leonard photographed in June 1979

When Leonard decided to turn professional, Janks Morton introduced him to Mike Trainer, a friend of his who was an attorney. Trainer talked 24 of his friends and clients into underwriting Leonard's career with an investment of $21,000 to be repaid within four years at 8% interest. Trainer then made Leonard the sole stockholder in Sugar Ray Leonard, Inc. Angelo Dundee, Muhammad Ali's trainer, was brought in to be Leonard's trainer and manager. Many of the people being considered wanted absolute control and a cut somewhere near the manager's traditional 33%. Dundee had a different proposition. Although he would prescribe the training procedures, he would leave the day-to-day work to Dave Jacobs and Janks Morton. He would also choose Leonard's opponents. For his services, Dundee would get 15% of Leonard's purse.

Leonard made his professional debut on February 5, 1977, before a crowd of 10,270 at the Civic Center in Baltimore. He was paid $40,044 for the fight. His opponent was Luis "The Bull" Vega, whom he defeated by a six-round unanimous decision. After the fight, Leonard paid back his $21,000 loan to the investors.

In his fourteenth professional fight, Leonard fought his first world-ranked opponent, Floyd Mayweather, who was ranked seventeenth. The fight took place on September 11, 1978. Leonard won by a tenth-round knockout. A month later, Leonard defeated his old amateur nemesis Randy Shields by a ten-round unanimous decision.

On August 12, 1979, Leonard knocked out Pete Ranzany in four rounds to win the NABF Welterweight Championship. The following month, he made his first title defense against Andy Price. Price, an up-and-coming contender who was sponsored by Marvin Gaye, had a reputation for prolonged bouts in earlier fights and was believed by sports reporters to defeat or give a long fight to Leonard. Although Price landed multiple good blows, Leonard knocked him out in the first round, advancing his record to 25–0 with 16 knockouts.

=== First world title ===
==== Leonard vs. Benitez ====
Leonard fought Wilfred Benítez for the WBC Welterweight Championship on November 30, 1979, at Caesars Palace in Las Vegas, Nevada. There was a capacity crowd of about 4,600. Leonard received $1 million and Benitez, a two-division champion with a record of 38–0–1, received $1.2 million.

It was a highly competitive and tactical battle. In the first round, Leonard rocked Benitez with a left hook that came off a jab and right cross. Late in the third, Leonard dropped Benitez on the seat of his pants with a stiff left jab. More embarrassed than hurt, Benitez got up quickly. Benitez started improving in the fourth, slipping numerous punches and finding the range with his right hand. "I wasn't aware I was in a championship early because I hit him so easy," Leonard said. "But then he adjusted to my style. It was like looking in a mirror."

In the sixth, there was an accidental clash of heads, which opened a cut on the forehead of Benitez. Blood flowed down his forehead and the bridge of his nose but stayed out of his eyes.

Leonard landed the harder punches and had Benitez hurt several times late in the fight, but Leonard couldn't put him away. Benitez was very slick. "No one, I mean no one, can make me miss punches like that," Leonard said.

Going into the final round, Leonard led by scores of 137–130, 137–133, and 136–134. The two went toe-to-toe in the fifteenth. Late in the round, Leonard dropped Benitez with a left. He got up, but after a few more punches, the referee stopped the fight. The time was 2:54 of round fifteen.

The Boxing Writers Association of America and The Ring named Leonard "Fighter of the Year" for 1979.

==== Leonard vs. Green ====
Leonard made his first title defense in Landover, Maryland, on March 31, 1980. His opponent was Dave "Boy" Green. The British challenger had a record of 33–2. In the fourth round, Leonard knocked Green out with a devastating left hook. Leonard called it "the hardest single punch I ever threw."

=== The Brawl in Montreal ===
On June 20, 1980, Leonard returned to the Olympic Stadium in Montreal to defend his title against Roberto Durán before a crowd of 46,317. Durán, the former Undisputed World Lightweight Champion for 6 1/2 years, had a record of 71–1 and was the No. 1 welterweight contender and considered the best "Pound for Pound" fighter in the world. Durán received $1.5 million and Leonard, working for a percentage of the closed-circuit gate as well as a guarantee, received over $9 million.

Durán forced the issue and took the fight to Leonard, cutting off the ring and denying Leonard space to fight his fight. Durán attacked at almost every turn. Leonard battled back again and again, but he had to work just to find room to breathe and swing, at times simply to survive. In the second, Durán rocked Leonard with a left hook, sending him into the ropes. Leonard started to do better by the fifth round, finding some punching room and throwing numerous multi-punch combinations. The two fought with great intensity throughout the fight. According to Bill Nack:

It was, from almost the opening salvo, a fight that belonged to Durán. The Panamanian seized the evening and gave it what shape and momentum it had. He took control, attacking and driving Leonard against the ropes, bulling him back, hitting him with lefts and rights to the body as he maneuvered the champion against the ropes from corner to corner. Always moving forward, he mauled and wrestled Leonard, scoring inside with hooks and rights. For three rounds Durán drove at Sugar Ray with a fury, and there were moments when it seemed the fight could not last five. Unable to get away, unable to counter and unable to slide away to open up the ring, Leonard seemed almost helpless under the assault. Now and then he got loose and countered—left-right-left to Durán's bobbing head—but he missed punches and could not work inside, could not jab, could not mount an offense to keep Durán at bay.

Durán was awarded a unanimous decision, although it was mistakenly read as a majority decision in the ring. The scorecard of judge Angelo Poletti was incorrectly added and announced as 147–147. He actually scored it 148–147. In rounds, he had it three for Durán, two for Leonard, and ten even. Sports Illustrated called his scorecard "a monument to indecision." Judges Raymond Baldeyrou and Harry Gibbs scored the fight 146–144 and 145–144, respectively. Associated Press had it 144–141 for Durán, while The New York Times had Leonard ahead 144–142.

"I did the best I could," Leonard said. "I think I pretty much fought from the heart." Asked if Leonard was the best he ever fought, Durán thought for a moment and then answered, "Si, si." Durán said. "He does have a heart. That's why he's living."

=== "No Más" in New Orleans ===
The rematch billed as "Stone vs. Sugar... Once Again", took place November 25, 1980, at the Louisiana Superdome in New Orleans in front of 25,038 fans. Leonard received $7 million and Durán received $8 million.

Dave Jacobs disagreed with the decision to have an immediate rematch with Durán and terminated his relationship with Leonard when the rematch was made. "My idea is that he should have a tune-up fight before he fights with Roberto again," Jacobs said. "I think he won the fight with Durán, but I don't think it is healthy for him to be fighting Durán right away."

After the Montreal fight Durán went on a partying binge and ballooned in weight. Leonard was aware of this, and in an interview for Beyond the Glory he said: "My intention was to fight Durán ASAP because I knew Durán's habits. I knew he would indulge himself; he'd gain 40–50 lbs and then sweat it off to make 147." Unlike the fight in Montreal, Leonard used his superior speed and movement to outbox and befuddle Durán. "The whole fight, I was moving, I was moving," Leonard said. "And Voom! I snapped his head back with a jab. Voom! I snapped it back again. He tried to get me against the ropes, I'd pivot, spin off and Pow! Come under with a punch."

In round seven, Leonard started to taunt Durán. Leonard's most memorable punch came late in the round. Winding up his right hand, as if to throw a bolo punch, Leonard snapped out a left jab and caught Durán flush in the face. "It made his eyes water," Leonard said. He continued to taunt Durán mercilessly. He stuck out his chin, inviting Durán to hit it. Durán hesitated. Leonard kept it up, continuing to move, stop, and mug.

In the closing seconds of the eighth round, Durán turned his back to Leonard and quit, saying to referee Octavio Meyran, "No Más" (English: "No more"). Leonard was the winner by a technical knockout at 2:44 of round eight, regaining the WBC Welterweight Championship. Leonard led by scores of 68–66, 68–66 and 67–66.

Durán said he quit because of stomach cramps, caused by overeating after the weigh-in. "At the end of the fifth round, I got cramps in my stomach, and it kept getting worse and worse," Duran later said. "I felt weaker and weaker in my body and arms." He then announced, "I am retiring from boxing right now." During the night Durán was admitted to a hospital with stomach pains and discharged the following day.

Everyone was surprised by Durán's actions, none more so than his veteran trainers, Freddie Brown and Ray Arcel. "I was shocked," Brown said. "There was no indication that he was in pain or getting weak." Arcel was angry. "That's it," he said. "I've had it. This is terrible. I've handled thousands of fighters and never had anyone quit on me. I think he needs a psychiatrist more than he needs anything else." Durán's manager, Carlos Eleta, said, "Durán didn't quit because of stomach cramps. He quit because he was embarrassed. I know this." According to Randy Gordon, who witnessed Durán's antics beforehand and was in his dressing room immediately afterwards, Durán quit because of his huge eating binge prior to the fight.

"I made him quit," Leonard said. "To make a man quit, to make Roberto Durán quit, was better than knocking him out."

=== Second world title ===
==== Leonard vs. Bonds ====
On March 28, 1981, Leonard defended his title against Larry Bonds, the WBC sixth-ranked contender, at the Carrier Dome in Syracuse, New York. Bonds was a southpaw, which made him a good opponent for Leonard, given that his next opponent was scheduled to be the WBA Light Middleweight Champion Ayub Kalule, a southpaw.

Leonard was the aggressor throughout, with Bonds circling the ring. He staggered Bonds with a right in the fourth round and dropped him with a follow-up combination. Bonds got up and continued to move, with Leonard in pursuit. Leonard dropped him again in the tenth. Bonds rose but Leonard didn't let him off the hook. The referee stopped the fight with Bonds taking punishment in a corner.

==== Leonard vs. Kalule ====
Leonard moved up to the junior middleweight division and faced Kalule on June 25, 1981, at the Astrodome in Houston, Texas. Kalule, who was 36–0, had been the WBA Light Middleweight Champion for two years.

Kalule and his handlers had expected Leonard to use lateral movement against him, but Leonard chose to fight inside instead. After eight tough rounds, Leonard was ahead although Kalule appeared to be coming on strong in the eighth and ninth. Leonard finally hurt him with a right to the head. Shortly afterward, Leonard dropped him with a flurry of punches. Kalule got up but the referee waved it off. Leonard celebrated his victory with a full 360-degree, no-hands flip. Despite an official stoppage time of 2.59, the fight was actually stopped at 3.06 into the round, meaning Kalule should have been saved by the bell.

=== The Showdown ===
Promoted as "The Showdown", Leonard fought Thomas Hearns on September 16, 1981, at Caesars Palace in Las Vegas to unify the World Welterweight Championship in a scheduled fifteen-rounder. They fought before a live crowd of 23,618. Hearns was paid $5.1 million, and Leonard made over $11 million. The fight grossed over $35 million. The live gate was $5.9 million, and the revenue from pay-per-view was $7.5 million.

Hearns, 32–0 with 30 knockouts, won the WBA Welterweight Championship in 1980, scoring a second-round knockout of José "Pipino" Cuevas in Detroit, Michigan. He made three successful title defenses, stopping Luis Primera, Randy Shields, and Pablo Baez.

The fight began as expected with Leonard boxing from a distance and Hearns stalking. Leonard had difficulty with Hearns' long reach and sharp jab. By the end of round five, Leonard had a growing swelling under his left eye, and Hearns had built a considerable lead on the scorecards. Leonard, becoming more aggressive, hurt Hearns in the sixth with a left hook to the chin. Leonard battered Hearns in rounds six and seven, but Hearns regrouped. Hearns started to stick and move, and he started to pile up points again. The roles reversed: Leonard became the stalker and Hearns became the boxer. The fight billed as a classic showdown between a powerful knockout artist and the best boxer/puncher the welterweight division had seen in decades devolved into a slow, tactical fight.

Hearns won rounds nine through twelve on all three scorecards. Between rounds twelve and thirteen, Angelo Dundee told Leonard, "You're blowing it, son! You're blowing it!"

Leonard, with a badly swollen left eye, came out roaring for the thirteenth round. After hurting Hearns with a right, Leonard exploded with a combination of punches. Hearns' legs were clearly gone and after more pressure from Leonard he was bundled through the ropes, no knockdown was given as it wasn't a punch that sent him there. Hearns managed to rise but was dropped by a flurry of hard punches near the end of the round.

In round fourteen, after staggering Hearns with an overhand right, Leonard pinned Hearns against the ropes, where he unleashed another furious combination, prompting referee Davey Pearl to stop the contest and award Sugar Ray Leonard the Unified World Welterweight Championship. Hearns was leading by scores of 124–122, 125–122, and 125–121.

After the fight, there was controversy due to the scoring of rounds six and seven. Even though Leonard dominated, hurting Hearns and battering him, all three judges gave both rounds to Leonard by a 10–9 margin. Many felt that the ten-point must scoring system was not properly used and those rounds should have been scored 10–8. Some also considered the stoppage premature. Veteran ringside commentator Don Dunphy said "They're stopping the fight. I don't believe it. Hearns was ahead on points." However, Emanuel Steward, Hearns' manager and trainer, said, "I felt that the referee was justified in stopping the fight ... Tommy did not have enough energy to make it through the fight."

The fight was named "Fight of the Year" by The Ring. Leonard was named "Fighter of the Year" by The Ring and The Boxing Writers Association of America. He was also named "Athlete of the Year" by ABC's Wide World of Sports and "Sportsman of the Year" by Sports Illustrated.

=== Retirement and return ===
On February 15, 1982, Leonard defended the unified title against Bruce Finch, the WBC fourth-ranked contender, in a bout at Reno, NV. Leonard knocked him out in the third round. Leonard's next fight was scheduled to be against Roger Stafford on May 14, 1982, in Buffalo, New York. While training, Leonard started to see floaters. He went to a doctor and discovered that he had a detached retina. The fight was canceled, and Leonard had surgery to repair the retina on May 9, 1982.

On November 9, 1982, Leonard invited Marvin Hagler and other boxing dignitaries to a charity event in Baltimore, Maryland to hear him announce whether he would continue his career. Standing in a boxing ring with Howard Cosell, the master of ceremonies, Leonard announced his retirement, saying a bout with Hagler would unfortunately never happen. Leonard maintained his eye was fully healed, but that he just didn't want to box anymore.

Missing the limelight and the competition, Leonard announced in December 1983 that he was returning to the ring. Leonard boasted that he would have a couple of ten-round bouts and then take on Milton McCrory, Donald Curry, Durán, Hearns and finally Hagler. This decision was met with a torrent of criticism from fans and the media, who felt Leonard was taking unnecessary risks with his surgically repaired eye.

A bout with Philadelphia's Kevin Howard, who was 20–4–1, was scheduled for February 25, 1984. The fight was postponed when Leonard had minor surgery on his right eye to fix a loose retina. This latest eye problem further fueled the flames of those who opposed Leonard's comeback.

Before the fight with Howard, Dave Jacobs rejoined Leonard's team in a limited role. Jacobs had quit in 1980, disagreeing with Leonard's decision to have an immediate rematch with Durán.

Leonard and Howard fought on May 11, 1984, in Worcester, Massachusetts. Howard knocked Leonard flat on his back in the fourth round. It was the first knockdown of Leonard's professional career. Leonard came back to stop Howard in the ninth round, but the stoppage was disputed, with some feeling that the referee stopped the fight prematurely. Leonard was ahead on all three scorecards at the time of the stoppage. At the post-fight press conference, Leonard surprised everyone by announcing his retirement again, saying he just didn't have it anymore.

=== Leonard vs. Hagler ===
On March 10, 1986, Marvin Hagler knocked out John Mugabi in eleven rounds to retain the Undisputed World Middleweight Championship for the twelfth time and advance his record to 62–2–2. After the bout Hagler stated it may be his last fight. "I was ringside," Leonard said. "I'm watching John 'The Beast' Mugabi outbox Hagler. Of all people, John 'The Beast' Mugabi." It was then that Leonard decided to come back and fight Hagler. He called Mike Trainer and said, "I can beat Hagler."

On May 1, 1986, Leonard announced on a Washington, D.C. talk show that he would return to the ring to fight Hagler. The announcement generated a lot of controversy because of Leonard's inactivity and eye injuries, yet it also excited many sports fans who had hoped to see them fight years earlier. Hagler took a few months to decide, then agreed to the match.

The fight, promoted as "The Super Fight" and "The King of the Ring", was scheduled for April 6, 1987, at Caesars Palace in Las Vegas. Leonard was guaranteed $11 million, and Hagler was guaranteed $12 million. Hagler was a heavy favorite. The odds started at 4–1, then settled at 3–1. A paying crowd of 12,379 generated a live gate of $6.2 million. According to Bob Arum, the fight grossed $78 million (which equates to around $179 million in 2020).

The original fight plan for Leonard was to go toe-to-toe with Hagler and try to cut him, but the plan changed about five days before the fight. Leonard got hit by sparring partner Quincy Taylor and was badly buckled. "He almost knocked me out," Leonard said. After that, Leonard decided to box Hagler.

Many were surprised that Hagler, a natural southpaw, opened the fight boxing out of an orthodox stance. After the quick and slick Leonard won the first two rounds on all three scorecards, Hagler started the third round as a southpaw. Hagler did better, but Leonard's superior speed and boxing skill still allowed him to control the fight. Hagler looked stiff and mechanical and missed the speedy Leonard time and again prompting CBS ringside commentator Gil Clancy to remark "...and is he ever missing...Leonard isn't doing anything to make him miss, he's just missing!"

By the fifth, Leonard, who was moving a lot, began to tire and Hagler started to get closer. Hagler buckled Leonard's knees with a right uppercut near the end of the round, which finished with Leonard on the ropes. Hagler continued to score somewhat effectively in round six. Leonard, having slowed down, was obliged to fight more and move less. However, he was able to outpunch Hagler along the ropes and got the better of several bristling exchanges. Hagler never seized total control of the fight as he had against Thomas Hearns two years earlier, when he brutalized Hearns and scored a third-round knockout. Hagler's punches lacked snap and, although he was scoring solidly to the body, he looked nothing like the powerful fighter who had dominated the middleweight division for the previous five years. Leonard's observation that the Hagler who beat John Mugabi was older and slower proved to be spot on. In rounds seven and eight, Hagler's southpaw jab was landing solidly, and Leonard's counter flurries were less frequent.

Round nine was the most exciting round of the fight. Hagler hurt Leonard with a left cross and pinned him in a corner. Leonard looked to be in trouble, but he furiously fought his way out of the corner. The action see-sawed back and forth for the rest of the round, with each man having his moments. However, Hagler's moments were more spectacular and one of Hagler's cornermen: Roger Perron (in an interview that took place on an episode of HBO's Legendary Nights episode segments in 2003) later stated that: "the ninth round was probably Marvin (Hagler)'s, best round."

Round ten was tame by comparison, as the pace slowed after the furious action of the previous round but with Hagler having more spectacular moments. Despite Leonard's obvious fatigue, he boxed well in the eleventh. Every time Hagler scored, Leonard came back with something flashier and more eye-catching, if not as effective. But at that point in the fight, Hagler appeared to be slightly more ring-general and clearly more aggressive. Between rounds eleven and twelve, Leonard's trainer: Angelo Dundee, implored Sugar Ray to get up off his stool yelling "We got three minutes...new champ...new champ!" Leonard yelled "Yeah!" and played to the screaming crowd. Hagler's corner was much more reserved prompting Clancy to comment: "They're talking to him like it's an IBM meeting or something...no emotion." In the final round, Hagler continued to chase Leonard. He hit Leonard with a big left hand and backed him into a corner. Leonard responded with a furious flurry, landing few punches but whipping the upset-hoping crowd into a frenzy. Hagler backed off, and Leonard danced away with Hagler in pursuit. The fight ended with Hagler and Leonard exchanging along the ropes. At the final bell, even uniformed ringside security rushed into the ring applauding and lauding Leonard's effort.

Leonard threw 629 punches and landed 306, while Hagler threw 792 and landed 291.

Leonard was awarded a controversial split-decision. Judge Dave Moretti scored it 115–113 for Leonard, while judge Lou Filippo had it 115–113 for Hagler. Judge José Guerra scored the fight 118–110 for Leonard. Many felt that Hagler deserved the decision because he was the aggressor and landed the harder punches. Scottish boxing journalist Hugh McIlvanney wrote that Leonard's plan was to "steal rounds with a few flashy and carefully timed flurries...he was happy to exaggerate hand speed at the expense of power, and neither he nor two of the scorers seemed bothered by the fact that many of the punches landed on the champion's gloves and arms."

Many others felt that Leonard deservedly got the decision, arguing that Leonard landed more punches and showed better defense and ring generalship. Jim Murray, long-time sports columnist for the Los Angeles Times, wrote, "It wasn't even close...He didn't just outpoint Hagler, he exposed him. He made him look like a guy chasing a bus. In snowshoes...Leonard repeatedly beat Hagler to the punch. When he did, he hit harder. He hit more often...He made Hagler into what he perceived him to be throughout his career—a brawler, a swarmer, a man who could club you to death only if you stood there and let him. If you moved, he was lost."

The scorecards from the ringside press and broadcast media attest to the polarizing views and opinions of the fight.

- ABC (Howard Cosell): 117–112 Leonard
- Associated Press: 117–112 Hagler
- Baltimore Sun: 7–5 Leonard (115–113 Leonard)
- Boston Globe (Ron Borges): 115–113 Hagler
- Boston Globe (Steve Marantz): 117–111 Leonard
- Boston Herald: 116–113 Leonard
- CBS (Gil Clancy): 115–113 Leonard
- CBS (Tim Ryan): 115–114 Hagler
- Chicago Sun-Times: 115–114 Hagler
- Chicago Tribune (1 - Bob Verdi): 115–113 Hagler
- Chicago Tribune (2 - Bernie Lincicome): 115–113 Hagler
- Chicago Tribune (3 - Sam Smith): 115–113 Hagler
- ESPN (Al Bernstein): 115–113 Hagler
- ESPN (Dave Bontempo): 114–114
- HBO (Harold Lederman): 115–113 Leonard
- HBO (Larry Merchant): 114–114
- Houston Chronicle: 115–114 Leonard
- Newark Star-Ledger (Jerry Izenberg): 115–113 Hagler
- KO Magazine: 118–111 Leonard
- Miami Herald: 116–112 Hagler
- Miami News: 116–112 Hagler
- Los Angeles Times: 117–111 Leonard
- Newsday: 115–114 Hagler
- New York Daily News (1): 117–111 Leonard
- New York Daily News (2 - Michael Katz): 117–112 Leonard
- New York Post (1): 114–114
- New York Post (2 - Jerry Lisker): 115–113 Hagler
- New York Times (Dave Anderson): 114–114
- Oakland Tribune: 117–112 Leonard
- Philadelphia Daily News (1): 116–112 Leonard
- Philadelphia Daily News (2): 115–113 Hagler
- Ring Magazine (Nigel Collins): 115–113 Leonard
- Ring Magazine (Phill Marder): 114–114
- San Jose Mercury-News: 116–115 Hagler
- Seattle Times: 115–113 Hagler
- Sports Illustrated (Hugh McIlvanney): 116–112 Hagler
- Sports Illustrated (William Nack): 116–114 Leonard
- Sports Illustrated (Pat Putnam): 115–113 Hagler
- United Press International: 116–112 Leonard
- USA Today: 115–113 Leonard
- Washington Post: 114–114

The fight was named "Fight of the Year" and "Upset of the Year" by The Ring.

Despite requests from the Hagler camp, Leonard was uninterested in a rematch and retired on May 27, 1987. "I'll try, I'll give it a shot," Leonard said of his latest retirement. "But you guys know me." A month after Hagler's formal retirement in June 1988, Leonard would announce another comeback.

=== Second comeback ===
==== Leonard vs. Lalonde ====
On November 7, 1988, Leonard made another comeback, facing Donny Lalonde at Caesars Palace in Las Vegas. They fought for Lalonde's WBC Light Heavyweight Championship and the newly created WBC Super Middleweight Championship, which meant that Lalonde had to make 168 lbs. Many were critical of the fact that Lalonde's light heavyweight title was on the line when the weight limit of the fight with Leonard was at 168 pounds, and critical of Leonard for stipulating that his opponent—a natural 175-pounder—should weigh less than his usual fighting weight, which could possibly weaken him. However, Lalonde later told HBO's Larry Merchant that he didn't have any trouble making weight.

Lalonde, 31–2 with 26 knockouts, was guaranteed at least $6 million and Leonard was guaranteed over $10 million.

This would be Leonard's first professional fight without Angelo Dundee. For Leonard's fight with Hagler, Dundee worked without a contract and received $175,000, which was less than 2% of Leonard's purse. Dundee was unhappy with that amount. He requested a contract for the Lalonde fight and Leonard refused. "I don't have contracts. My word is my bond," Leonard said. Janks Morton and Dave Jacobs trained Leonard for the Lalonde fight.

Lalonde's size and awkwardness troubled Leonard. In the fourth round, a right hand to the top of Leonard's head dropped him for just the second time in his career. Early in the ninth, Lalonde hurt Leonard with a right to the chin. Leonard fired back and hurt Lalonde with a right. He drove him to the ropes and unleashed a furious assault. Lalonde tried to tie up Leonard but got dropped with a powerful left hook. He rose but was soon down again, and the fight was stopped. Judges Chuck Giampa and Franz Marti had Leonard ahead by scores of 77–74 and 77–75, respectively. Judge Stuart Kirshenbaum had Lalonde ahead 76–75.

After the fight, Leonard vacated the light heavyweight title, but kept the super middleweight title. Also, Leonard and Janks Morton split because of personal differences. Morton was replaced as co-trainer by Pepe Correa, who had worked with Leonard for most of the previous fifteen years.

==== Leonard vs. Hearns ====
On June 12, 1989, Leonard defended the WBC Super Middleweight Championship in a rematch with Thomas Hearns at Caesars Palace. It was promoted as "The War." Hearns was guaranteed $11 million, and Leonard was guaranteed $14 million.

Hearns dropped Leonard with a right cross in the third round, but Leonard came back and battered Hearns around the ring in the fifth. Early in the seventh round, Hearns hurt Leonard but punched himself out going for the knockout. With Hearns fatigued, Leonard came back and had a strong finish to the round. Rounds nine and ten were good rounds for Leonard, but he ran into trouble in the eleventh round. Three booming rights from Hearns sent Leonard down for the second time in the fight. Knowing he needed a big finish; Leonard fought furiously and had a big final round.

The judges scored the fight a draw and Leonard retained the title. Judge Jerry Roth scored the fight 113–112 for Hearns, Judge Tom Kazmarek scored it 113–112 for Leonard, and Judge Dalby Shirley scored it 112–112. Shirley was the only judge to give Leonard a 10–8 margin in the twelfth. If he had scored it 10–9, as his two colleagues did, Hearns would have won by a split decision. Eventually, Leonard admitted that Hearns deserved the decision.

==== Leonard vs. Durán III – Uno Más ====
On December 7, 1989, Leonard defended the title against Roberto Durán, who was the reigning WBC Middleweight Champion. Durán was guaranteed $7.6 million, and Leonard's arrangement guaranteed him over $13 million.

For the Durán fight, Leonard cut his entourage from twenty-one to six. Dave Jacobs was one of the people let go, leaving Correa as the sole trainer. Correa was instructed not to spare the whip. "For the first time in a long time, I allowed someone to push me," Leonard said.

The fight took place at the new Mirage Hotel in Las Vegas. Leonard used constant lateral movement and won by a lopsided twelve-round unanimous decision over a listless Durán. The scores were 120–110, 119–109, and 116–111. In a fight that many considered to be very boring, both fighters were booed often by the fans, and many left the arena before the decision was announced. Pat Putnam of Sports Illustrated wrote, "Leonard gave them artistic perfection when they wanted heated battle, and they booed lustily. Most fight fans would not spend a dime to watch Van Gogh paint Sunflowers, but they would fill Yankee Stadium to see him cut off his ear." Although Leonard dominated the fight, he suffered several cuts. His lower lip was cut from a headbutt in the fourth round, his left eye was cut in the eleventh round, and his right eye was cut in the twelfth round. The cuts required a total of 60 stitches.

In August 1990, Leonard relinquished the WBC super-middleweight title, saying that he was under the weight for the division. He then offered Hearns a third fight, but Hearns said he could no longer make the weight and moved up to the light heavyweight division.

==== Leonard vs. Norris ====
On February 9, 1991, Leonard went down to 154 lbs and fought WBC Light Middleweight Champion Terry Norris at Madison Square Garden. Leonard entered the bout as a 3-1 favorite, but Norris dominated the fight, giving Leonard a heavy beating. He knocked Leonard down with a left hook in the second round, and in the seventh, he dropped Leonard again with a short right. Leonard had no answer for the skillful, younger, faster man. Leonard went the distance but lost by a lopsided decision. The scores were 120–104, 119–103, and 116–110. After the verdict was announced, Leonard announced his retirement. "It took this fight to show me it is no longer my time," Leonard said. "Tonight was my last fight. I know how Hagler felt now."

=== Final comeback ===
In October 1996, the 40-year-old Leonard announced that he was coming out of retirement to fight 34-year-old Héctor Camacho for the lightly regarded International Boxing Council (IBC) Middleweight Championship. Camacho, a light-hitting southpaw, was a three-time world champion with a record of 62–3–1. However, Camacho was also considered to be past his prime. Leonard decided to fight Camacho after commentating on Camacho's fight with the 45-year-old Roberto Durán the previous year, describing the disputed unanimous decision as "an early Christmas gift."

Leonard blamed his poor performance against Norris on lack of motivation, a rib injury, moving down in weight, and divorce, which was being litigated while he was in training. "It was stupid for me to fight Norris at 154 pounds," Leonard said. "This is different. I'm in the best shape possible." For the Camacho fight, Leonard had a new trainer, Adrian Davis. "He's a great trainer, a throwback," Leonard said. "He has really helped me get ready."

In January 1997, it was announced that Leonard had been voted into the International Boxing Hall Of Fame in Canastota, New York. The rules state that a boxer must be retired for five years before being eligible for induction. When the vote took place, Leonard had been retired for more than five years, therefore, he was eligible, even though he had a fight scheduled. The induction ceremony was on June 15, 1997.

The fight with Camacho took place on March 1, 1997, in Atlantic City, New Jersey. Camacho applied pressure from the opening bell and started to score well in the third. He continued to score well in the fourth and opened a cut above Leonard's right eye. In the fifth, Camacho dropped Leonard with a right followed by two left uppercuts. Leonard got up but was unable to ward off Camacho. The referee stopped the fight with Camacho teeing off on a defenseless Leonard on the ropes. It was the only time in Leonard's career that he was knocked out.

Afterward, Leonard retired again, saying, "For sure, my career is definitely over for me in the ring." However, less than a week after the fight, Leonard said he planned to fight again. He blamed his loss on a torn right calf muscle. His doctor suggested that he cancel the fight, but Leonard wanted to go through with it. Before the fight, he was given a shot of novocaine.

Leonard said he planned to have a series of tune-up fights before fighting a champion. He was scheduled to fight Tony Menefee on February 15, 1998, in Australia, but he pulled out of the fight, saying that he didn't have the motivation. The Camacho fight was Leonard's last. He finished his career with a record of 36–3–1 with 25 knockouts.

== Media appearances ==
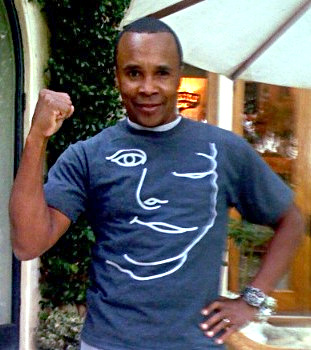
Leonard in 2007

Leonard has worked as a boxing analyst for ABC, CBS, NBC, ESPN, HBO and EPIX. His relationship with HBO lasted for more than a decade. It ended in 1990, after HBO was not offered an opportunity to bid on the telecast rights to Leonard's fight with Terry Norris. HBO believed it would be inappropriate for Leonard to continue with them if they couldn't bid on his fights. Leonard's attorney, Mike Trainer, said, "There never has been a linkage between his broadcasting and his fighting."

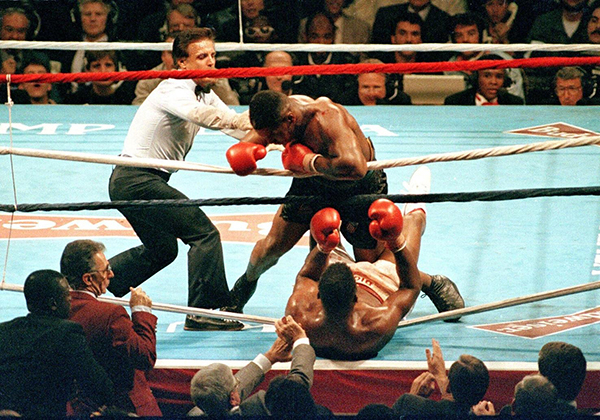
Sugar Ray Leonard (background, second from right) at the Mike Tyson Tyrell Biggs fight in Atlantic City in 1987

Leonard has provided commercial endorsements for companies including Coca-Cola, EA Sports, Ford, Nabisco, Revlon and 7 Up. His most famous commercial was a 7 Up ad he did with his son, Ray Jr., Roberto Durán and Durán's son Roberto Jr. in the early 1980s. Leonard is among the most sought-after motivational/inspirational speakers in the world today. His speech, entitled "Power" (Prepare, Overcome and Win Every Round), is consistently booked with major Fortune 500 companies throughout the United States and abroad.

Leonard has also worked as an actor. He cameos in the music video for The Time's 1990 single "Jerk Out" as a bystander watching the band leave a party. He has appeared in numerous television shows, including Half & Half, L.A. Heat, Married... with Children, Renegade (1995) and Tales From The Crypt. He has also appeared in several movies, including I Spy and most recently The Fighter (2010), starring Christian Bale and Mark Wahlberg. This movie brought back memories of his fight with Dicky Eklund. He also worked as an adviser in the 2011 robot boxing film Real Steel. Leonard served as host and mentor to the aspiring fighters on The Contender. Sylvester Stallone, who co-hosted during the first season, was one of the executive producers, along with Mark Burnett. When Leonard left the show, he was replaced as host by Tony Danza for the final season.

In 2001, Leonard launched Sugar Ray Leonard Boxing Inc., a boxing promotional company, and announced the company's strategic partnership with ESPN. Together, Leonard and ESPN would produce and promote "Sugar Ray Leonard and ESPN II Presents Friday Night Fights", which would air the first Friday of every month for twelve months. Leonard's boxing promotional company was dissolved in 2004. He had a falling out with partner Bjorn Rebney, whom he called "a cancer in my company." Speaking of his promotional company, Leonard said, "We did some great shows with evenly matched fights. I took great pride in it. But the TV show came about and made my decision a lot easier. I already had it in the back of my mind to dissolve the company. The working environment was not healthy."

In 2009, Leonard was a celebrity contestant on Are You Smarter Than a 5th Grader?, in which he made $50,000 for the Juvenile Diabetes Research Foundation. Two years later, he competed on season 12 of ABC's Dancing with the Stars with Anna Trebunskaya, who were voted off in Week 4 of the show. During his appearance on The Colbert Report in 2011, Leonard was defeated by host Stephen Colbert in a thumb wrestling contest. He appeared as a guest at the chef's table, along with Tito Ortiz, during the tenth season of Hell's Kitchen. He is the celebrity spokesperson for the Atlanta law firm John Foy and Associates, PC.

Leonard was also the subject of a Seinfeld episode (season 6, episode 21) where George tries to flatter his boss by saying he looks like Sugar Ray Leonard. The real Leonard (a Seinfeld fan) mentioned that he was told about the episode by friends and family but had never seen it for himself until a friend gave him the DVD set for a gift.

In March 2019, Leonard made a guest appearance on the popular daily morning show on YouTube, Good Mythical Morning, hosted by Rhett McLaughlin and Link Neal. In this episode of the "March Milkness" series (where Rhett and Link created a March Madness style bracket to determine the best breakfast cereal), Leonard was brought in to break a tie between the Fruity Region Champion, Froot Loops, and the Chocolatey Region Champion, Oreo O's. His decision was to push Froot Loops onto the Finals, where they were taken out by Cinnamon Toast Crunch.

== Personal life ==
=== Family ===
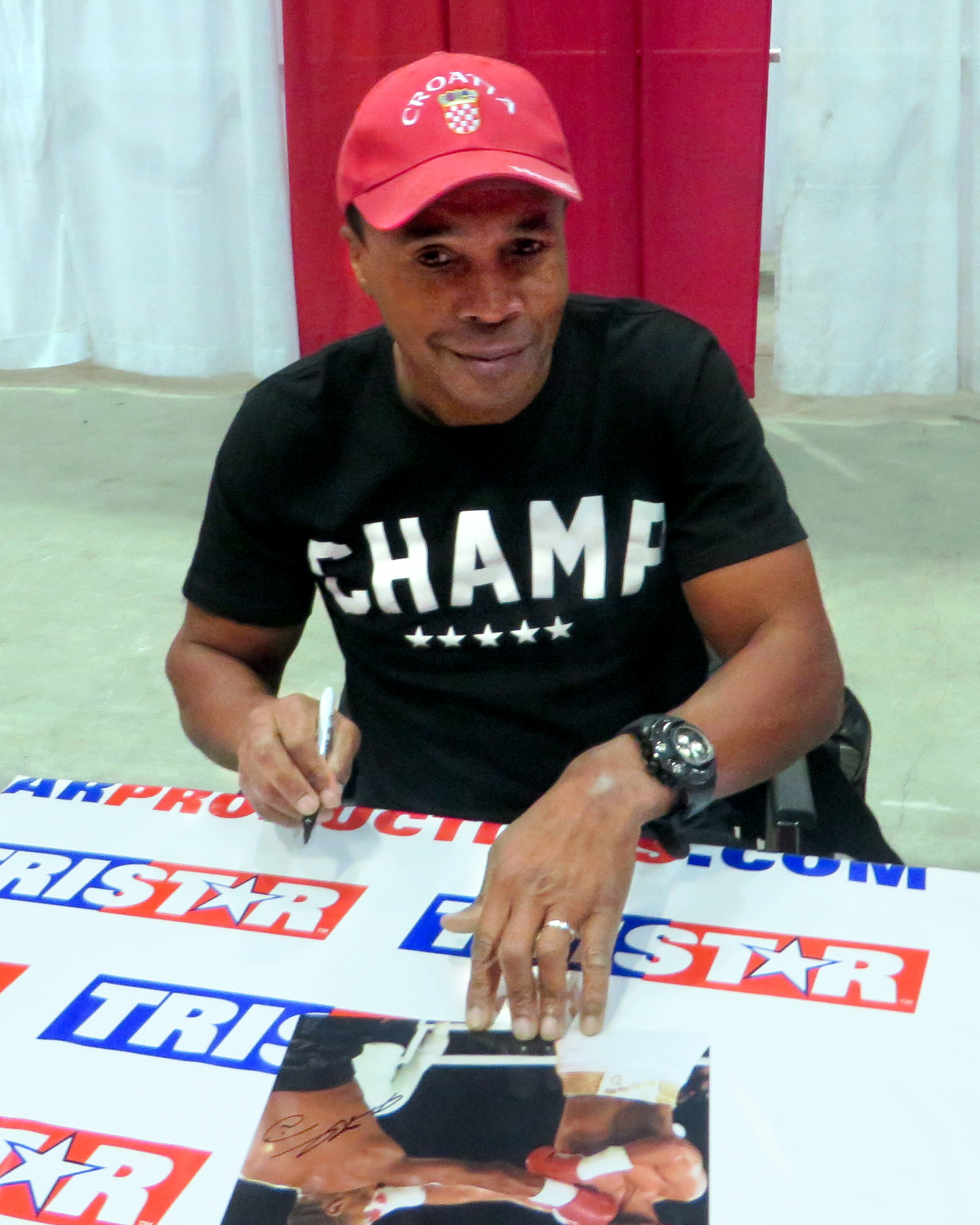
Leonard in 2014

Leonard married his high school sweetheart, Juanita Wilkinson, in January 1980. Their six-year-old son, who was born when they were teenagers, served as the ring bearer. In 1984, they had another son. They were divorced in 1990. During divorce proceedings, Juanita Leonard testified that her husband physically abused her while under the influence of alcohol. She also said he was an occasional cocaine user. In his testimony, Leonard confirmed his wife's claims and went on to reveal that the problems of their marriage were not due to drug and alcohol use.

After the Los Angeles Times broke the story, Leonard held a press conference and publicly acknowledged that the accusations were true. He said he started using medication after he retired in 1982, following surgery to repair a detached retina. "I wanted more", Leonard said. "I wanted that arena. I didn't want anyone to tell me my career had to end." "I decided to search for a substitute...I resorted to cocaine. I used when I felt bad, I used when I missed competing at that level", he said. "It was a crutch, something that enabled me to forget." He said he quit using drugs in early 1986, when he woke up one morning and "what I saw in the mirror was scary." "I can never erase the pain or the scars I have made through my stupidity, my selfishness", Leonard said. "All I can do is say I'm sorry, but that is not enough." In 2011, Leonard revealed in an NPR interview that he had been free of alcohol since July 2006.

In 1989, Leonard was introduced to Bernadette Robi by Kenny G at a Luther Vandross concert. Robi is the daughter of Paul Robi, one of the original Platters, and she is the ex-wife of Lynn Swann. Leonard and Robi were married at Leonard's $8.7 million estate in Pacific Palisades, California in August 1993. At the wedding ceremony, the grounds were converted into a garden with 10,000 roses and blossoms of other flowers flown in from the Netherlands. They have a daughter, Camille and a son, Daniel.

Leonard is also the godfather of Khloé Kardashian and has appeared on many episodes of Keeping Up with the Kardashians.

=== Charity work ===
For many years, Leonard has been the International Chairman of the Juvenile Diabetes Research Foundation's Walk for a Cure and is actively involved in raising both awareness and funds.

Leonard testified before the Senate Committee on Homeland Security and Government Affairs in 2009. The Senate hearing was titled "Type 1 Diabetes Research: Real Progress and Real Hope for a Cure". He testified about the burden of diabetes and the need for continued research funding to find a cure.

Leonard and his wife, Bernadette, founded the Sugar Ray Leonard Foundation to support the Juvenile Diabetes Research Foundation and its annual Walk for a Cure. In 2009, the foundation expanded to support programs that help people rebuild their communities in ten cities across the United States. It supports accessible housing, healthcare services, and educational services and job training.

In 2007 he was awarded The Ambassador Award of Excellence by the LA Sports & Entertainment Commission at the Riviera Country Club for his continued community involvement.

=== Advocacy ===
In his autobiography The Big Fight: My Life in and out of the Ring, published in June 2011, Leonard reveals that as a young boxer he was the victim of sexual abuse from an Olympic trainer as well as another man, a benefactor. He has since made public appearances to bring attention to the issue of child sex abuse, declaring himself a "poster child" for the cause and encouraging victims to report their abuse.

== Professional boxing record ==
40 fights	36 wins	3 losses
By knockout	25	1
By decision	11	2
Draws	1	

No.	Result	Record	Opponent	Type	Round, time	Date	Location	Notes
40	Loss	36–3–1	Héctor Camacho	TKO	5 (12), 1:08	Mar 1, 1997	Convention Hall, Atlantic City, New Jersey, U.S.	For IBC middleweight title
39	Loss	36–2–1	Terry Norris	UD	12	Feb 9, 1991	Madison Square Garden, New York City, New York, U.S.	For WBC light middleweight title
38	Win	36–1–1	Roberto Durán	UD	12	Dec 7, 1989	The Mirage, Paradise, Nevada, U.S.	Retained WBC super middleweight title
37	Draw	35–1–1	Thomas Hearns	SD	12	Jun 12, 1989	Caesars Palace, Paradise, Nevada, U.S.	Retained WBC super middleweight title; For WBO super middleweight title
36	Win	35–1	Donny Lalonde	TKO	9 (12), 2:30	Nov 7, 1988	Caesars Palace, Paradise, Nevada, U.S.	Won WBC light heavyweight and inaugural WBC super middleweight titles
35	Win	34–1	Marvin Hagler	SD	12	Apr 6, 1987	Caesars Palace, Paradise, Nevada, U.S.	Won WBC and The Ring middleweight titles
34	Win	33–1	Kevin Howard	TKO	9 (10), 2:27	May 11, 1984	Centrum, Worcester, Massachusetts, U.S.	
33	Win	32–1	Bruce Finch	TKO	3 (15), 1:50	Feb 15, 1982	Centennial Coliseum, Reno, Nevada, U.S.	Retained WBA, WBC, and The Ring welterweight titles
32	Win	31–1	Thomas Hearns	TKO	14 (15), 1:45	Sep 16, 1981	Caesars Palace, Paradise, Nevada, U.S.	Retained WBC and The Ring welterweight titles; Won WBA welterweight title
31	Win	30–1	Ayub Kalule	TKO	9 (15), 3:06	Jun 25, 1981	Astrodome, Houston, Texas, U.S.	Won WBA and The Ring light middleweight titles
30	Win	29–1	Larry Bonds	TKO	10 (15), 2:22	Mar 28, 1981	Carrier Dome, Syracuse, New York, U.S.	Retained WBC and The Ring welterweight titles
29	Win	28–1	Roberto Durán	TKO	8 (15), 2:44	Nov 25, 1980	Superdome, New Orleans, Louisiana, U.S.	Won WBC and The Ring welterweight titles
28	Loss	27–1	Roberto Durán	UD	15	Jun 20, 1980	Olympic Stadium, Montreal, Quebec, Canada	Lost WBC and The Ring welterweight titles
27	Win	27–0	Dave Boy Green	KO	4 (15), 2:27	Mar 31, 1980	Capital Centre, Landover, Maryland, U.S.	Retained WBC and The Ring welterweight titles
26	Win	26–0	Wilfred Benítez	TKO	15 (15), 2:54	Nov 30, 1979	Caesars Palace, Paradise, Nevada, U.S.	Won WBC and The Ring welterweight titles
25	Win	25–0	Andy Price	KO	1 (12), 2:52	Sep 28, 1979	Caesars Palace, Paradise, Nevada, U.S.	Retained NABF welterweight title
24	Win	24–0	Pete Ranzany	TKO	4 (12), 2:41	Aug 12, 1979	Caesars Palace, Paradise, Nevada, U.S.	Won NABF welterweight title
23	Win	23–0	Tony Chiaverini	RTD	4 (10)	Jun 24, 1979	Caesars Palace, Paradise, Nevada, U.S.	
22	Win	22–0	Marcos Geraldo	UD	10	May 20, 1979	Riverside Centroplex, Baton Rouge, Louisiana, U.S.	
21	Win	21–0	Adolfo Viruet	UD	10	Apr 21, 1979	Dunes, Paradise, Nevada, U.S.	
20	Win	20–0	Daniel Aldo Gonzalez	TKO	1 (10), 2:03	Mar 24, 1979	Community Center, Tucson, Arizona, U.S.	
19	Win	19–0	Fernand Marcotte	TKO	8 (10), 2:33	Feb 11, 1979	Convention Center, Miami Beach, Florida, U.S.	
18	Win	18–0	Johnny Gant	TKO	8 (12), 2:57	Jan 11, 1979	Capital Centre, Landover, Maryland, U.S.	
17	Win	17–0	Armando Muniz	RTD	6 (10), 3:00	Dec 9, 1978	Civic Center, Springfield, Massachusetts, U.S.	
16	Win	16–0	Bernardo Prada	UD	10	Nov 3, 1978	Cumberland County Civic Center, Portland, Maine, U.S.	
15	Win	15–0	Randy Shields	UD	10	Oct 6, 1978	Civic Center, Baltimore, Maryland, U.S.	
14	Win	14–0	Floyd Mayweather Sr.	TKO	10 (10), 2:16	Sep 9, 1978	Civic Center, Providence, Rhode Island, U.S.	
13	Win	13–0	Dicky Eklund	UD	10	Jul 18, 1978	John B. Hynes Memorial Auditorium, Boston, Massachusetts, U.S.	
12	Win	12–0	Rafael Rodriguez	UD	10	Jun 3, 1978	Civic Center, Baltimore, Maryland, U.S.	
11	Win	11–0	Randy Milton	TKO	8 (10), 2:55	May 13, 1978	Memorial Auditorium, Utica, New York, U.S.	
10	Win	10–0	Bobby Haymon	RTD	3 (10)	Apr 13, 1978	Capital Centre, Landover, Maryland, U.S.	
9	Win	9–0	Javier Muniz	KO	1 (8), 2:45	Mar 19, 1978	Veterans Memorial Coliseum, New Haven, Connecticut, U.S.	
8	Win	8–0	Art McKnight	TKO	7 (8), 1:52	Mar 1, 1978	Hara Arena, Dayton, Ohio, U.S.	
7	Win	7–0	Rocky Ramon	UD	8	Feb 4, 1978	Civic Center, Baltimore, Maryland, U.S.	
6	Win	6–0	Hector Diaz	KO	2 (8), 2:20	Dec 17, 1977	D.C. Armory, Washington, D.C., U.S.	
5	Win	5–0	Augustin Estrada	KO	6 (8), 1:54	Nov 5, 1977	Caesars Palace, Paradise, Nevada, U.S.	
4	Win	4–0	Frank Santore	KO	5 (8), 2:55	Sep 24, 1977	Civic Center, Baltimore, Maryland, U.S.	
3	Win	3–0	Vinnie DeBarros	TKO	3 (6), 1:59	Jun 10, 1977	Civic Center, Hartford, Connecticut, U.S.	
2	Win	2–0	Willie Rodriguez	UD	6	May 14, 1977	Civic Center, Baltimore, Maryland, U.S.	
1	Win	1–0	Luis Vega	UD	6	Feb 5, 1977	Civic Center, Baltimore, Maryland, U.S.	

== Titles in boxing ==
=== Major world titles ===
- WBA welterweight champion (147 lbs)
- WBC welterweight champion (147 lbs) (2×)
- WBA light middleweight champion (154 lbs)
- WBC middleweight champion (160 lbs)
- WBC super middleweight champion (Note: Won the inaugural title on November 7, 1988.) (168 lbs)
- WBC light heavyweight champion (175 lbs)

=== The Ring magazine titles ===
- The Ring welterweight champion (147 lbs) (2×)
- The Ring light middleweight champion (154 lbs)
- The Ring middleweight champion (160 lbs)

=== Regional/International titles ===
- NABF welterweight champion (147 lbs)

=== Undisputed titles ===
- Undisputed welterweight champion

== See also ==
- List of welterweight boxing champions
- List of light middleweight boxing champions
- List of middleweight boxing champions
- List of undisputed boxing champions
- List of WBA world champions
- List of WBC world champions
- List of WBO world champions
- List of The Ring world champions
- List of boxing quintuple champions

== Notes and references ==
=== References ===
Sporting positions
Amateur boxing titles
Previous: James Busceme	U.S. Golden Gloves lightweight champion 1973	Next: Curtis Harris
Previous: Larry Bonds	U.S. Golden Gloves light welterweight champion 1974	Next: Paul Sherry
Previous: Randy Shields	U.S. light welterweight champion 1974, 1975	Next: Milton Seward
Regional boxing titles
Preceded by Pete Ranzany	NABF welterweight champion August 12, 1979 – November 30, 1979; Won WBC title	Vacant Title next held by Randy Shields
World boxing titles
Preceded by Wilfred Benítez	WBC welterweight champion November 30, 1979 – June 20, 1980	Succeeded by Roberto Durán
Preceded by Wilfred Benítez	The Ring welterweight champion November 30, 1979 – June 20, 1980	Succeeded by Roberto Durán
Preceded by Roberto Durán	WBC welterweight champion November 25, 1980 – November 9, 1982; Retired	Vacant Title next held by Milton McCrory
Preceded by Roberto Durán	The Ring welterweight champion November 25, 1980 – November 9, 1982; Retired	Vacant Title next held by Donald Curry
Preceded by Ayub Kalule	WBA light middleweight champion June 25, 1981 – September 23, 1981; Vacated	Vacant Title next held by Tadashi Mihara
Preceded by Ayub Kalule	The Ring light middleweight champion June 25, 1981 – September 23, 1981; Vacated	Vacant Title next held by Thomas Hearns
Preceded by Thomas Hearns	WBA welterweight champion September 16, 1981 – November 9, 1982; Retired	Vacant Title next held by Donald Curry
Vacant Title last held by José Nápoles	Undisputed welterweight champion September 16, 1981 – November 9, 1982; Retired	Vacant Title next held by Donald Curry
Preceded by Marvin Hagler	WBC middleweight champion April 6, 1987 – May 27, 1987; Retired	Vacant Title next held by Thomas Hearns
Preceded by Marvin Hagler	The Ring middleweight champion April 6, 1987 – May 27, 1987; Retired	Vacant Title next held by Sumbu Kalambay
Inaugural champion	WBC super middleweight champion November 7, 1988 – August 27, 1990; Vacated	Vacant Title next held by Mauro Galvano
Preceded by Donny Lalonde	WBC light heavyweight champion November 7, 1988 – November 17, 1988; Vacated	Vacant Title next held by Dennis Andries
Awards
Previous: Matthew Saad Muhammad vs. Yaqui López II	The Ring Fight of the Year vs. Thomas Hearns; 1981	Next: Bobby Chacon vs. Rafael Limón IV
Previous: U.S. Olympic Hockey Team	Wide World of Sports; Athlete of the Year; 1981	Next: Wayne Gretzky
Previous: Steve Cruz vs. Barry McGuigan	The Ring Fight of the Year vs. Marvin Hagler; 1987	Next: Tony Lopez vs. Rocky Lockridge
Previous: Lloyd Honeyghan; KO6 Donald Curry	The Ring Upset of the Year; SD12 Marvin Hagler; 1987	Next: Iran Barkley; TKO3 Thomas Hearns
Previous: Inaugural award	Mark Grossinger Etess Award for Boxer of the Decade; 1980–1989	Next: Award discontinued
