= Lucas Msomba =

Tanzanian boxer (born 1954)

Personal information
- Nationality: Tanzanian
- Born: 15 May 1954 (age 72)

Sport
- Sport: Boxing
Medal record
Men's amateur boxing
Representing Tanzania
All-Africa Games
Bronze medal – third place	1978 Algiers	Light-welterweight

Lucas Msomba (born 15 May 1954) is a Tanzanian boxer. He competed in the men's welterweight event at the 1980 Summer Olympics. Msomba won a bronze medal in the light-welterweight category at the 1978 All-Africa Games.

== Career highlights ==
(bronze) TSC Tournament (63,5 kg), East Berlin, East Germany, October 1977:

- 1/2: Lost to Günther Lieser (East Germany) by decision

Commonwealth Games (67 kg), Edmonton, Canada, August 1978:

- 1/4: Lost to John Raftery (Canada) by decision

Olympic Games (67 kg), Moscow, Soviet Union, July–August 1980:

- 1/16: Defeated Elio Diaz (Venezuela) by majority decision, 4–1
- 1/8: Lost to Karl-Heinz Krüger (East Germany) by unanimous decision, 0–5

Commonwealth Games (71 kg), Brisbane, Australia, October 1982:

- 1/8: Lost to Nicholas Croombes (United Kingdom) by decision
