= Daniele Zappaterra =

Italian boxer

Personal information
- Nationality: Italian
- Born: 19 September 1955 (age 70) Serravalle, Ferrara, Italy

Sport
- Sport: Boxing

Daniele Zappaterra (born 19 September 1955) is an Italian former boxer. He competed in the men's light welterweight event at the 1976 Summer Olympics.

Zappaterra began boxing in 1970 when he was fifteen years old. He participated in the 1976 Olympics but lost the first round to Clinton McKenzie from the United Kingdom. He turned professional the following year. In 1982 he became the Italian champion as a super-welterweight, but lost the title in 1983. By the end of his professional career, he had 27 wins (7 by KO), 7 losses (5 by KO), and 2 draws.

He was imprisoned for a few months from 1982 to 1983 for terrorist gang activities, and in 2008 he was sentenced to four years in prison for possessing and trafficking illegal drugs.
