= Vladimir Kolev =

Bulgarian boxer (born 1954)

Medal record

Men's boxing

Representing Bulgaria

Olympic Games
Bronze medal – third place	1976 Montreal	Light welterweight

World Amateur Championships
Silver medal – second place	Havana 1974	Light welterweight

European Championships
Bronze medal – third place	1973 Belgrade	Welterweight

Vladimir Kolev (Bulgarian: Владимир Колев, born April 18, 1954) is a retired boxer from Bulgaria and Olympic bronze medalist. He also works as an actor, and has appeared in many American films.

At the 1976 Summer Olympics in Montreal, Quebec, Canada, he won the bronze medal in the light welterweight division (– 63'5 kg) after being defeated in the semifinals by eventual runner-up Andrés Aldama of Cuba.

Two years earlier, at the inaugural 1974 World Championships in Havana, Cuba, he won the silver medal, after losing to Ayub Kalule from Uganda in the final.
