= Sugar Ray Leonard vs. Larry Bonds =

Boxing match

- Date: March 28, 1981
- Venue: Carrier Dome, Syracuse, New York, U.S.
- Title(s) on the line: WBC and The Ring welterweight titles

Tale of the tape
Boxer	Ray Leonard	Larry Bonds
Nickname	Sugar	
Hometown	Palmer Park, Maryland, U.S.	Denver, Colorado, U.S.
Purse	$750,000	$100,000
Pre-fight record	28–1 (19 KO)	29–3 (9 KO)
Age	24 years, 10 months	29 years, 3 months
Height	5 ft 10 in (178 cm)	5 ft 10 in (178 cm)
Weight	145 lb (66 kg)	144 lb (65 kg)
Style	Orthodox	Southpaw
Recognition	WBC and The Ring; Welterweight Champion	WBC; No. 6 Ranked Welterweight

Result
- Leonard wins via 10th-round technical knockout

Sugar Ray Leonard vs. Larry Bonds was a professional boxing match contested on March 28, 1981, for the WBC and The Ring welterweight titles.

== Background ==
In January 1981, reigning WBC welterweight champion "Sugar" Ray Leonard announced that he would move up in weight in order to challenge the then-WBA light middleweight champion Ayub Kalule in a bid to win his second world title. Before facing Kalule in June 1981, it was announced that Leonard had reached and agreement to first face fringe-welterweight contender Larry Bonds in Syracuse, New York's Carrier Dome on March 28. Bonds, who like Kalule fought in the southpaw stance, was looked at as a mere tune-up for Leonard prior to facing Kalule.

Bonds, who worked as a garbageman and had not fought in almost a year, was nevertheless ranked as the number-six welterweight contender by the WBC. Bonds' ranking was questioned by some with even Bonds himself stating that he was "kinda surprised" that he was "in the ratings so long after not fighting." WBC president José Sulaimán admitted that Bonds was not a strong contender and was only ranked as high as he was due to the relative lack of viable contenders in the welterweight division stating "I agree it doesn't look good, but it would look much worse if we rated somebody that we would be embarrassed by."

Before settling on Bonds, Leonard's original choice of opponent was his 1976 Olympics teammate Clinton Jackson, who also utilized the southpaw stance. However, though Jackson had competed as a welterweight in the Olympics, he had only fought professionally as a light middleweight up to that point and was not listed in the WBC's welterweight rankings, causing the Leonard–Jackson fight to fall through.

== Fight Details ==
Leonard was the aggressor for the entire fight and had won every round on two of the judge's scorecards, while taking all but one round on the third. Nevertheless, the slick-boxing, defensive-minded Bonds held his own and recovered from an early knockdown in the fourth round to take the highly favored champion to the tenth round. The knockdown occurred late in the fourth round when Leonard sending Bonds down with a right uppercut after backing him into the ropes, though Bonds was able to get back up as time expired. Leonard would mostly dominate the remainder of the fight but was unable to get to Bonds until the tenth round. Leonard would score a second knockdown in the tenth, again backing Bonds against the ropes and sending Bonds to his knee after a five-punch combination. Bonds would get back up at the count of eight and resumed the fight but Leonard once again backed Bonds into a corner and landed several punishing blows before referee Arthur Mercante Sr. stopped the fight at 2:22 of the round, giving Leonard the victory via technical knockout.

== Fight card ==
Confirmed bouts:

Weight Class	Weight		vs.		Method	Round	Notes
Welterweight	147 lbs.	Ray Leonard (c)	def.	Larry Bonds	TKO	10/15	^{note 1}
Middleweight	160 lbs.	Tony Ayala Jr.	def.	Mario Maldonado	KO	3/8
Light Middleweight	154 lbs.	Davey Moore	def.	Tony Suero	TKO	4/6
Super Featherweight	130 lbs.	Bernard Taylor	def.	Antonio Nieves	UD	6/6
Heavyweight	200+ lbs.	Steve Zouski	def.	Tyrone Harlee	UD	6/6
Middleweight	160 lbs.	Alex Ramos	def.	Dan Snyder	UD	6/6
Welterweight	147 lbs.	Johnny Bumphus	def.	Jackie Morrell	TKO	4/6

^Note 1 For WBC and The Ring Welterweight Titles

== Broadcasting ==
Country	Broadcaster
United Kingdom	ITV
United States	HBO

Preceded by vs. Roberto Durán II	Ray Leonard's bouts 28 March 1981	Succeeded by vs. Ayub Kalule
Preceded by vs. Costello King	Larry Bonds's bouts 28 March 1981	Succeeded by vs. Ronnie Shields
