= Miroslav Pavlov =

Slovak boxer

Personal information
- Nationality: Slovak
- Born: 22 August 1956 (age 68); Kamanová, Czechoslovakia

Sport
- Sport: Boxing

Miroslav Pavlov (born 22 August 1956) is a Slovak boxer. He competed in the men's welterweight event at the 1980 Summer Olympics.
