= Jesús Navas (boxer) =

Venezuelan boxer (born 1953)

Personal information
- Nationality: Venezuelan
- Born: 3 August 1953 (age 72)

Sport
- Sport: Boxing
Medal record
Men's amateur boxing
Representing Venezuela
Pan American Games
Bronze medal – third place	1975 Mexico City	Light welterweight

Jesús Navas (born 3 August 1953) is a Venezuelan boxer. He competed in the men's light welterweight event at the 1976 Summer Olympics.
