= Boxing at the 1980 Summer Olympics – Welterweight =

Boxing competitions

Welterweight boxing at the Games of the XXII Olympiad
- Venue: Olympiysky Sports Complex
- Date: 22 July – 2 August 1980
- Competitors: 29 from 29 nations

Medalists
1st place, gold medalist(s)		Andrés Aldama	Cuba
2nd place, silver medalist(s)		John Mugabi	Uganda
3rd place, bronze medalist(s)		Karl-Heinz Krüger	East Germany
3rd place, bronze medalist(s)		Kazimierz Szczerba	Poland

The welterweight boxing competition at the 1980 Olympic Games in Moscow was held from 22 July to 2 August at the Olympiysky Sports Complex. 29 boxers from 29 nations competed.

== Schedule ==
Date	Time	Round
Tuesday, 22 July 1980	12:00; 18:00	Round of 32
Sunday, 27 July 1980	12:00; 18:00	Round of 16
Wednesday, 30 July 1980	13:00	Quarterfinals
Thursday, 31 July 1980	13:00	Semifinals
Saturday, 2 August 1980	15:00	Final

== Results ==
=== Finals ===
Semifinals
Andrés Aldama (CUB)	5
Karl-Heinz Krüger (GDR)	0
Kazimierz Szczerba (POL)	2
John Mugabi (UGA)	3

Final
Andrés Aldama (CUB)	4
John Mugabi (UGA)	1

=== Top half ===
Round of 32
Andrés Aldama (CUB)	RSC
Pierre Sotoumey (BEN)
Tömöriin Battör (MGL)	0
Peter Talanti (ZAM)	5
Outsana Dao (LAO)
Joseph Frost (GBR)	KO
Lucas Msomba (TAN)	4
Elio Díaz (VEN)	1
Karl-Heinz Krüger (GDR)	5
Mohamed Ali El-Dahan (SYR)	0

Round of 16
Sadie Jaffar Mohammed (IRQ)	0
Plamen Yankov (BUL)	5
Israyel Hakobkokhyan (URS)	2
Andrés Aldama (CUB)	3
Peter Talanti (ZAM)
Joseph Frost (GBR)	KO
Lucas Msomba (TAN)	0
Karl-Heinz Krüger (GDR)	5

Quarterfinals
Plamen Yankov (BUL)
Andrés Aldama (CUB)	KO
Joseph Frost (GBR)	0
Karl-Heinz Krüger (GDR)	5

Semifinals
Andrés Aldama (CUB)	5
Karl-Heinz Krüger (GDR)	0

=== Bottom half ===
Round of 32
Ben Sisay (SLE)	DSQ
Kebede Sahilu (ETH)
Kazimierz Szczerba (POL)	RSC
Miroslav Pavlov (TCH)
Roland Omoruyi (NGR)	0
Kalevi Marjamaa (FIN)	5
Ionel Budușan (ROU)	5
Patrick Davitt (IRL)	0
Imre Csjef (HUN)
Paul Rasamimanana (MAD)	KO
Georges Koffi (CGO)
John Mugabi (UGA)	KO
Ole Svendsen (DEN)	1
Michael Pillay (SEY)	4
Mehmet Bogujevci (YUG)	5
Mohamed Al Moukdad (LIB)	0

Round of 16
Kebede Sahilu (ETH)	0
Kazimierz Szczerba (POL)	5
Kalevi Marjamaa (FIN)
Ionel Budușan (ROU)	RSC
Paul Rasamimanana (MAD)
John Mugabi (UGA)	KO
Michael Pillay (SEY)
Mehmet Bogujevci (YUG)	KO

Quarterfinals
Kazimierz Szczerba (POL)	RSC
Ionel Budușan (ROU)
John Mugabi (UGA)	KO
Mehmet Bogujevci (YUG)

Semifinals
Kazimierz Szczerba (POL)	2
John Mugabi (UGA)	3
