= Sugar Ray Leonard vs. Kevin Howard =

Boxing match

The Best is Back!
- Date: May 11, 1984
- Venue: The Centrum, Worcester, Massachusetts, U.S.

Tale of the tape
Boxer	Ray Leonard	Kevin Howard
Nickname	Sugar	The Spoiler
Hometown	Palmer Park, Maryland, U.S.	Philadelphia, Pennsylvania, U.S.
Purse	$3,000,000	$125,000
Pre-fight record	32–1 (23 KO)	20–4–1 (11 KO)
Age	27 years, 11 months	23 years, 7 months
Height	5 ft 9 1/2 in (177 cm)	5 ft 9 in (175 cm)
Weight	149 lb (68 kg)	150 1/2 lb (68 kg)
Style	Orthodox	Orthodox
Recognition	2-division world champion	

Result
- Leonard wins via 9th-round KO

Sugar Ray Leonard vs. Kevin Howard, billed as The Best is Back! was a professional boxing match contested on May 11, 1984.

== Background ==
Former WBC welterweight champion "Sugar" Ray Leonard announced his comeback to boxing in December 1983 after having retired the previous year following a retina injury. The following month, Leonard's opponent was officially announced to be little-known fringe contender Kevin Howard. In anticipation for a future fight with then-middleweight champion Marvin Hagler, Leonard decided to fight Howard as a light middleweight, a division where he had only one prior fight, rather than return to the welterweight division he had spent the majority of his career. Leonard also insisted on using thumb-less gloves as a precaution against eye injuries. Originally, the fight was scheduled to take place on February 25, 1984, however, the Massachusetts Boxing Commission required that Leonard get examined by a retinal specialist whom declared that while his surgically repaired left retina was fine, his right retina was determined to be loose resulting in the fight immediately being postponed. Leonard would then undergo cryotherapy treatment on his right after-which it was determined his right eye had healed enough to put the fight back on albeit with a new May 11 date.

Leonard had hoped to stage his comeback fight at Madison Square Garden, but the rock band Yes had already had the February 25th date booked. Yes was eventually forced to pull out of their scheduled concert due to illness and Leonard's lawyer and adviser Mike Trainer was notified of the Garden's availability but declined as he had already agreed to hold the fight in Atlantic City. Issues with New Jersey's 9% luxury tax eventually led the bout to be moved to The Centrum in Worcester, Massachusetts.

== The fight ==
Leonard was knocked down for the first time in his professional career in the fourth round. Leonard was in control of the fight and began taunting Howard by shuffling his feet, winding up his right hand and dropping his hands down and sticking his chin out, challenging Howard to land a punch. However, Howard would counter a Leonard jab landing flush with a right hand to Leonard's jaw that sent Leonard down to the canvas. Leonard would quickly get back up and Howard would continue his attack, but Leonard was able to withstand it and survive the round. Leonard would have little trouble with Howard for the remainder of the fight and would finally end the fight in the ninth round. With around a minute left in the round, Leonard would land a left hook to Howard's head. A stunned Howard nearly went down but held on to Leonard to prevent Howard from falling down. Leonard would attack Howard and after landing a barrage of punches, and the referee stopped the fight, giving Leonard the victory by technical knockout at 2:28 of the round nine.

== Aftermath ==
Leonard was sufficiently disappointed in his performance that he announced his retirement at the post-fight press conference. "As of this moment I am retired," he told the assembled press. "There's no sense in fooling myself or anyone else. It's just not there. I just can't go on and humiliate myself. I fought with apprehension. I had fear for my eyes. I had fear for my whole body. But now I am content. I did try."

== Fight card ==
Confirmed bouts:

Weight Class	Weight		vs.		Method	Round	Notes
Light Middleweight	154 lb	Ray Leonard	def.	Kevin Howard	TKO	9/10
Super Featherweight	130 lb	Kenny Baysmore	def.	Ruben Munoz Jr	KO	3/10
Light Middleweight	154 lb	Kenny Butler	def.	Lloyd Taylor	SD	10/10
Light Heavyweight	190 lb	Charles Price	def.	Tom Broady	PTS	6/6

== Broadcasting ==
Country	Broadcaster
Mexico	Televisa
Philippines	MBS 4
Puerto Rico	Telemundo Puerto Rico
United Kingdom	ITV
United States	HBO

Preceded by vs. Bruce Finch	Sugar Ray Leonard's bouts 11 May 1984	Succeeded by vs. Marvin Hagler
Preceded by vs. Bill Bradley	Kevin Howard's bouts 11 May 1984	Succeeded by vs. Robert Hines
