= Sadie Jabbar =

Iranian boxer (born 1957)

Personal information
- Full name: Sadie Jabbar Mohammed
- Nationality: Iraqi
- Born: 19 August 1957 (age 69)

Sport
- Sport: Boxing

Sadie Jabbar Mohammed (Arabic: سعدي جبار محمد, born 19 August 1957) is an Iraqi boxer. He competed in the men's welterweight event at the 1980 Summer Olympics.
