= Jean-Claude Ruiz =

French boxer

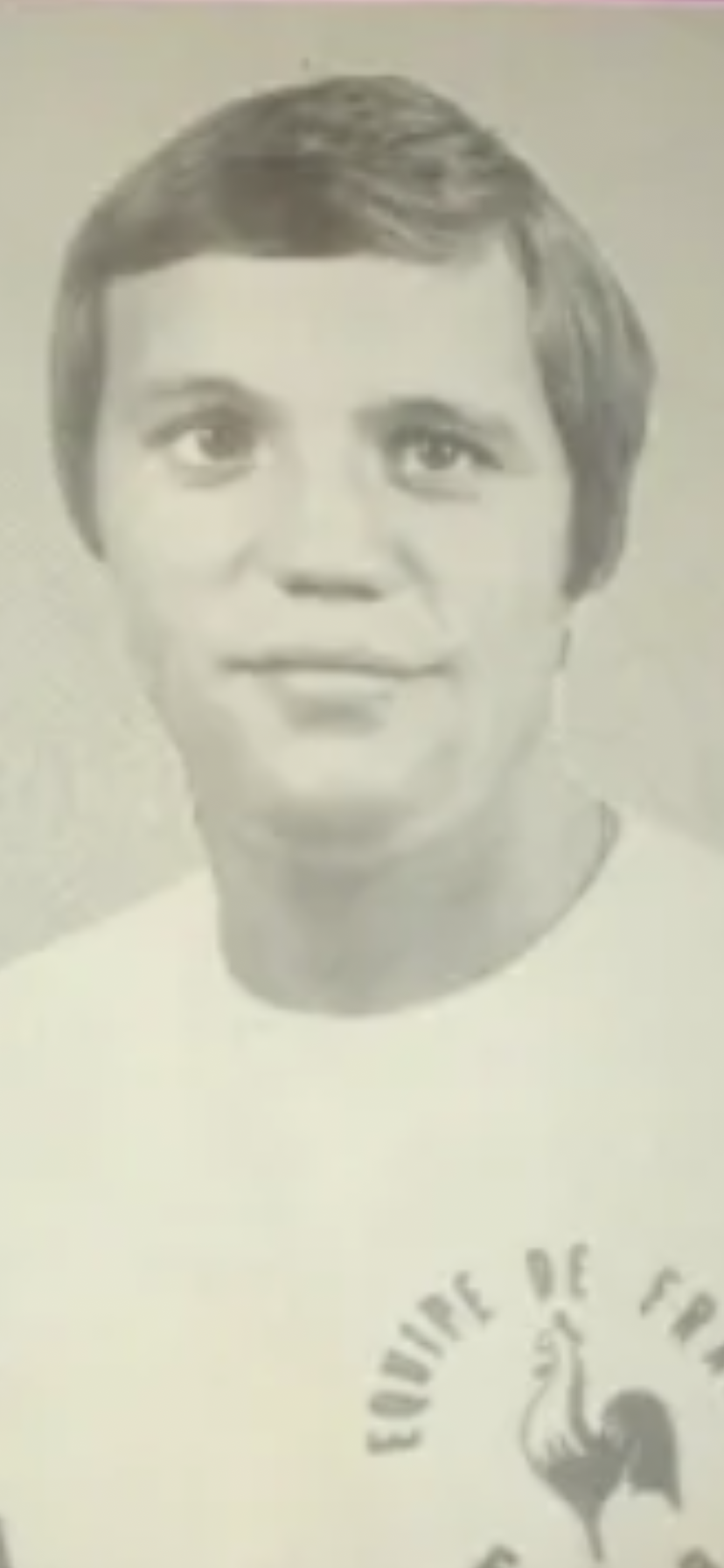
- Jean Claude Ruiz

Personal information
- Nationality: French
- Born: 30 November 1954 Flers, Orne, France
- Died: 21 February 2021 (aged 66) Rouen, France

Sport
- Sport: Boxing

Jean-Claude Ruiz (30 November 1954 – 21 February 2021) was a French boxer. He competed in the men's light welterweight event at the 1976 Summer Olympics. At the 1976 Summer Olympics, he lost to Calistrat Cuțov of Romania.
