= Karl-Heinz Krüger =

East German boxer

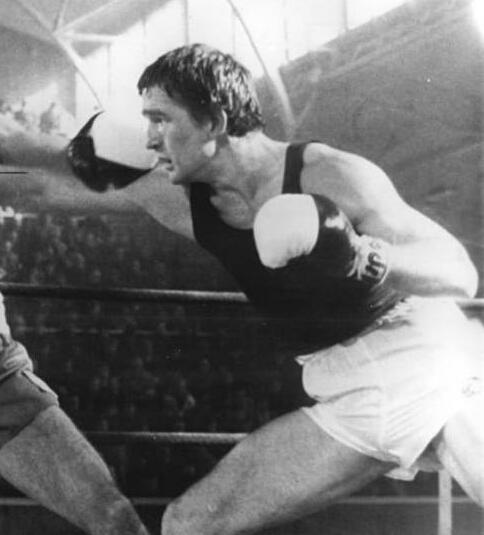
- Krüger in 1981

Personal information
- Full name: Karl-Heinz Krüger
- Nationality: East Germany
- Born: 25 December 1953 (age 72) Templin, East Germany
- Height: 1.74 m (5 ft 9 in)
- Weight: 65 kg (143 lb)

Sport
- Sport: Boxing
- Weight class: Welterweight
- Club: ASK Vorwärts Frankfurt
Medal record
Men's boxing
Representing East Germany
Olympic Games
Bronze medal – third place	1980 Moscow	Welterweight
World Amateur Championships
Bronze medal – third place	1978 Belgrade	Light welterweight
European Amateur Championships
Silver medal – second place	1977 Halle	Welterweight
Bronze medal – third place	1979 Cologne	Light Welterweight
Silver medal – second place	1981 Tampere	Welterweight

Karl-Heinz Krüger (born 25 December 1953) is a retired boxer who represented East Germany at the 1980 Summer Olympics in Moscow, Soviet Union. There he won the bronze medal in the welterweight division (– 67 kg), after being defeated in the semifinals by eventual gold medalist Andrés Aldama of Cuba. Two years earlier he also captured the bronze, at the second World Championships in Belgrade.

== Olympic results ==
- Defeated Mohamed Ali El-Dahan (Syria) 5–0
- Defeated Lucas Msomba (Tanzania) 5–0
- Defeated Joseph Frost (Great Britain) 5–0
- Lost to Andrés Aldama (Cuba) 0–5
