= Sugar Ray Leonard vs. Thomas Hearns =

1981 boxing match

The Showdown
- Date: September 16, 1981
- Venue: Caesars Palace, Paradise, Nevada, U.S.
- Title(s) on the line: WBA, WBC and The Ring undisputed welterweight titles

Tale of the tape
Boxer	Ray Leonard	Thomas Hearns
Nickname	Sugar	The Hitman
Hometown	Palmer Park, Maryland, U.S.	Detroit, Michigan, U.S.
Purse	$8,000,000	$5,000,000
Pre-fight record	30–1 (21 KO)	32–0 (30 KO)
Age	25 years, 3 months	22 years, 10 months
Height	5 ft 10 in (178 cm)	6 ft 1 in (185 cm)
Weight	146 lb (66 kg)	145 lb (66 kg)
Style	Orthodox	Orthodox
Recognition	WBC and The Ring; Welterweight Champion; WBA and The Ring; Super Welterweight champion 2-division world champion	WBA; Welterweight Champion; The Ring; No. 1 Ranked Welterweight

Result
- Leonard wins via 14th-round TKO

Sugar Ray Leonard vs. Thomas Hearns, billed as The Showdown, was a professional boxing match contested on September 16, 1981, for the undisputed welterweight championship.

== Background ==
Sugar Ray Leonard won the WBC welterweight title with a fifteenth-round knockout of Wilfred Benítez in 1979. He lost it to Roberto Durán by a close decision in June 1980 and regained it five months later in the infamous No Más Fight, in which Duran quit in the eighth round. In June 1981, Leonard moved up to the light-middleweight division for one fight, knocking out Ayub Kalule in nine rounds to win the WBA light-middleweight title.

Hearns won the WBA welterweight title in 1980, scoring a second-round knockout of Jose 'Pipino' Cuevas in Detroit, Michigan. He made three successful title defenses, stopping Luis Primera, Randy Shields, and Pablo Baez.

Promoted as "The Showdown" Leonard (30-1 with 21 KO) fought Hearns (32-0 with 30 KO) on September 16, 1981, at Caesar's Palace in Las Vegas, NV to unify the world welterweight championship in a scheduled fifteen-rounder. They fought before a live crowd of 23,618 and a worldwide TV audience of some 300 million. It was one of the first major bouts to be promoted by Main Events.

== The fight ==
The fight began as expected, Leonard boxing from a distance and Hearns stalking. Leonard had difficulty with Hearns' long reach and sharp jab. By the end of round five, Leonard had a growing swelling under his left eye, and Hearns had built a considerable lead on the scorecards. Leonard, becoming more aggressive, hurt Hearns in the sixth with a left hook to the chin. Leonard battered Hearns in rounds six and seven, but Hearns miraculously regrouped. Hearns started to stick and move, and he started to pile up points again. The roles reversed: Leonard became the stalker and Hearns became the boxer.

Hearns won rounds nine through twelve on all three scorecards. Between rounds twelve and thirteen, Leonard's trainer, the legendary Angelo Dundee, said the now legendary words "You're blowing it now, son! You're blowing it!"

Leonard, with a badly swollen left eye, came out roaring for the thirteenth round. After hurting Hearns with a right, Leonard exploded with a combination of punches and sent Hearns through the ropes. Hearns managed to rise, but was dropped again near the end of the round.

In round fourteen, after staggering Hearns with an overhand right, Leonard pinned Hearns against the ropes, where he unleashed another furious combination, prompting referee Davey Pearl to stop the contest and award Sugar Ray Leonard the undisputed world welterweight championship. Hearns was leading by scores of 124–122, 125–122, and 125–121.

== Aftermath ==
After the fight, there was controversy due to the scoring of rounds six and seven. Even though Leonard dominated, hurting Hearns and battering him, all three judges gave both rounds to Leonard by a 10-9 margin. Many felt that the ten-point must scoring system was not properly used and those rounds should have been scored 10–8. While the 10-point must system is now regarded as the international standard for scoring combat sports, at the time the Nevada Athletic Commission had only recently adopted it for all fights it sanctioned. As such, judges used to scoring with older methods—such as the 5-point must system or round scoring—had little guidance as to whether or not a round could be scored 10-8 if it did not contain a knockdown. There was some talk also of the fight being ended sooner and for less reason than was usual for the era.

=== Rematch ===
The rematch, billed as "The War", would happen eight years later June 12, 1989. Although most at the fight including the television announcers scored it as Hearns winning, the judges called it a draw and were loudly booed by the ringside crowd. With one judge scoring the fight 113-112 for Leonard, another judge scoring it 113–112 in favor of Hearns and the third scoring it even at 112–112.

== Undercard ==
Confirmed bouts:

- Marvis Frazier knocks out Guy Casale in Round 4.
- Tony Ayala knocks out Jose Baquedano in only 69 seconds of round 1.
- Edwin Rosario beat James Martinez by a 10-round Unanimous Decision.

== Broadcasting ==
Country	Broadcaster
Mexico	Televisa
Philippines	MBS 4
United Kingdom	ITV
United States	HBO

Preceded by vs. Ayub Kalule	Sugar Ray Leonard's bouts 28 March 1981	Succeeded by vs. Bruce Finch
Preceded by vs. Pablo Baez	Thomas Hearns's bouts 28 March 1981	Succeeded by vs. Ernie Singletary
Awards
Preceded by Matthew Saad Muhammad vs. Yaqui López II	The Ring Fight of the Year; 1981	Succeeded by Rafael Limón vs. Bobby Chacon IV
