= Mohamed Ali El-Dahan =

Syrian boxer

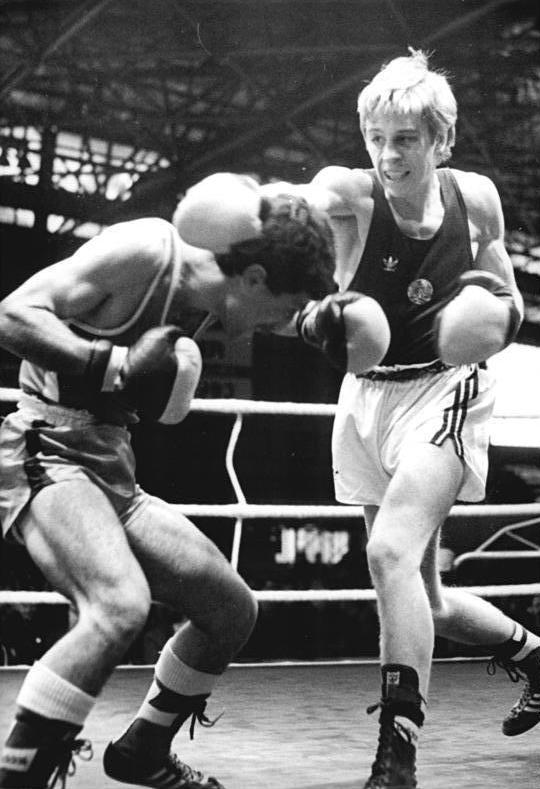
- Mohamed Ali El-Dahan (left) fighting East Germany's Roland Poye

Personal information
- Nationality: Syrian
- Born: 14 July 1960 (age 64); Damascus, UAR
- Height: 1.67 m (5 ft 6 in)
- Weight: 67 kg (148 lb)

Sport
- Sport: Boxing

Mohamed Ali El-Dahan (Arabic: محمد علي الدهان; born 14 July 1960) is a Syrian boxer. He competed at the 1980 Summer Olympics and the 1984 Summer Olympics.

== Olympic results ==
1980 (welterweight)

- Lost to Karl-Heinz Krüger (East Germany) 0-5

1984 (welterweight)

- Lost to Alexander Künzler (West Germany) 0-5
- 17th place
