= Ismael Martínez =

Puerto Rican boxer

Personal information
- Nationality: Puerto Rican
- Born: 27 May 1956 (age 69)

Sport
- Sport: Boxing

Ismael Martínez (born 27 May 1956) is a Puerto Rican boxer. He competed in the men's light welterweight event at the 1976 Summer Olympics. At the 1976 Summer Olympics, he defeated Siergot Sully of Haiti before losing to Clinton McKenzie of Great Britain.
