= Ernst Müller (boxer) =

German boxer

Personal information
- Nationality: German
- Born: 16 May 1954 (age 72) Düren, West Germany

Sport
- Sport: Boxing
Medal record
Men's amateur boxing
Representing West Germany
World Championships
Bronze medal – third place	1978 Belgrade	Welterweight
European Championships
Gold medal – first place	1979 Cologne	Welterweight

Ernst Müller (born 16 May 1954) is a German boxer. He competed for West Germany in the men's light welterweight event at the 1976 Summer Olympics. He was also the most probable West German runner-up for the 1980 Summer Olympics, but the West German government decided to join the U.S.-imposed boycott, so Müller missed the event together with the rest of the FRG Olympic squad.
