= Sugar Ray Leonard vs. Bruce Finch =

Boxing match

Reno's Got It!
- Date: February 15, 1982
- Venue: Centennial Coliseum, Reno, Nevada, U.S.
- Title(s) on the line: WBA, WBC and The Ring welterweight titles

Tale of the tape
Boxer	Ray Leonard	Bruce Finch
Nickname	Sugar	Lightnin'
Hometown	Palmer Park, Maryland, U.S.	Milwaukee, Wisconsin, U.S.
Purse	$1,300,000	$100,000
Pre-fight record	31–1 (22 KO)	28–3–1 (24 KO)
Age	25 years, 8 months	27 years, 11 months
Height	5 ft 10 in (178 cm)	5 ft 8 1/2 in (174 cm)
Weight	146 lb (66 kg)	145 lb (66 kg)
Style	Orthodox	Orthodox
Recognition	WBA, WBC and The Ring Undisputed; Welterweight Champion	WBA; No. 3 Ranked Welterweight; WBC; No. 4 Ranked Welterweight; The Ring; No. 6 Ranked Welterweight; NABF; Welterweight Champion

Result
- Leonard wins via 3rd-round technical knockout

Sugar Ray Leonard vs. Bruce Finch, billed as Reno's Got It!, was a professional boxing match contested on February 15, 1982 for the WBA, WBC and The Ring welterweight titles.

== Background ==
Just one month after arguably his biggest victory over Thomas Hearns in September, it was announced that newly crowned undisputed welterweight champion "Sugar" Ray Leonard would make his first defense of the title against NABF welterweight champion Bruce Finch, who was a top-5 ranked welterweight contender by both the WBA and WBC. Initially, negotiations were made to bring the fight to Finch's native Milwaukee, Wisconsin at the Milwaukee Arena in January 1982, but the bout was ultimately scheduled to take place in Reno, Nevada on February 15, 1982. The bout would be Reno's first title fight since the Jack Johnson–James J. Jeffries heavyweight championship fight in 1910, 72 years prior.

The fight against Leonard would be Finch's first since July. He had originally been scheduled to defend his NABF welterweight title against Milton McCrory on the Leonard–Hearns undercard in September, but McCrory pulled out of the fight at the last minute after injuring his hand.

== Fight Details ==
After a sluggish first round which he lost on all three of the official judge's scorecards, Leonard put forth one of the best performances of his career. Just past the midway point of the second round, Finch had Leonard against the ropes before Leonard stunned him with a right hand that backed Finch off and sent him retreating to the center of the ring. Leonard would follow up with a hook to the body and a hard right hand to the head that sent Finch down on his back. Finch was able to answer referee Mills Lane's 10-count at nine and continued the fight, however, Leonard quickly went on the attack and sent Finch down again only seconds later. This time Finch answered the 10-count at seven and though he was met with several more power punches from Leonard, managed to hold on and survive the round. In the third round, Finch attempted to engage Leonard offensively, but Leonard controlled the round and landed numerous power punches before landing another combination that sent Finch down on his knees. Finch remained on his knees before getting back on his feet at the count nine but was clearly dazed and on wobbly knees causing Lane to stop the fight. Leonard was named the winner by technical knockout at 1:50 of the round.

== Fight card ==
Confirmed bouts:

Weight Class	Weight		vs.		Method	Round	Notes
Welterweight	147 lbs.	Ray Leonard (c)	def.	Bruce Finch	TKO	3/15	^{note 1}
Welterweight	147 lbs.	Victor Abraham	def.	Frankie Davis	UD	10/10
Super Bantamweight	122 lbs.	Franco Torregoza	def.	Derrik Holmes	UD	8/8
Middlweight	160 lbs.	Odell Hadley	def.	Javier Harvey Solomon	PTS	8/8
Heavyweight	200+ lbs.	Mark Lee	def.	Dennis James	TKO	2/6
Lightweight	135 lbs.	Carlton Sparrow	def.	Tony Villa	UD	6/6

^Note 1 For WBA, WBC and The Ring Welterweight Titles

== Broadcasting ==
Country	Broadcaster
United States	HBO

Preceded by vs. Thomas Hearns	Ray Leonard's bouts 15 February 1982	Succeeded by vs. Kevin Howard
Preceded by vs. Sonny Perez	Bruce Finch's bouts 15 February 1982	Succeeded by vs. Donald Curry
