= Ulf Carlsson (boxer) =

Swedish boxer

Personal information
- Nationality: Swedish
- Born: 3 June 1949 (age 75); Idre, Sweden

Sport
- Sport: Boxing

Ulf Carlsson (born 3 June 1949) is a Swedish boxer. He competed in the men's light welterweight event at the 1976 Summer Olympics. At the 1976 Summer Olympics, he lost to Ray Leonard of the United States.
