= Mohamed Al Moukdad =

Lebanese boxer

Personal information
- Nationality: Lebanese

Sport
- Sport: Boxing

Mohamed Al Moukdad is a Lebanese boxer. He competed in the men's welterweight event at the 1980 Summer Olympics.
