= Outsana Dao =

Laotian boxer

Personal information
- Nationality: Laotian
- Born: 1 June 1960 (age 64)

Sport
- Sport: Boxing

Outsana Dao (born 1 June 1960) is a Laotian boxer. He competed in the men's welterweight event at the 1980 Summer Olympics. At the 1980 Summer Olympics, he lost to Joseph Frost of Great Britain.
