= Ayub Kalule vs. Sugar Ray Leonard =

Boxing match

Astrowars: Kalule vs. Leonard
- Date: June 25, 1981
- Venue: Astrodome, Houston, Texas, U.S.
- Title(s) on the line: WBA and The Ring light middleweight titles

Tale of the tape
Boxer	Ayub Kalule	Ray Leonard
Nickname		Sugar
Hometown	Kampala, Uganda	Palmer Park, Maryland, U.S.
Purse	$150,000	$2,500,000
Pre-fight record	36–0 (18 KO)	29–1 (20 KO)
Age	27 years, 5 months	25 years, 1 month
Height	5 ft 9 in (175 cm)	5 ft 10 in (178 cm)
Weight	153 lb (69 kg)	153 lb (69 kg)
Style	Southpaw	Orthodox
Recognition	WBA and The Ring; Light Middleweight Champion	WBC and The Ring; Welterweight Champion

Result
- Leonard wins via 9th-round technical knockout

Ayub Kalule vs. Sugar Ray Leonard, billed as Astrowars, was a professional boxing match contested on June 25, 1981 for the WBA and The Ring light middleweight titles.

== Background ==
In January 1981, it was announced that reigning WBC welterweight champion "Sugar" Ray Leonard would move up in weight in order to pursue his second world title in his second different weight class by challenging WBA light middleweight champion Ayub Kalule. Eventually, WBA welterweight champion Thomas Hearns was added to the card, dubbed Astrowars as it was held in Houston's Astrodome, defending his title against Pablo Baez in the co-main event.

In late March, Leonard and Hearns reached an agreement to face each other later in the year during the fall in a long-awaited unification bout in which both their respective welterweight titles would be on the line. However, Leonard insisted on continuing forward with his fight against Kalule much to the chagrin of promoter Bob Arum, who blasted Leonard's decision to fight Kalule before facing Hearns later in the year as "idiotic" and predicted Kalule would defeat Leonard and thus hurt both the gate and dim the anticipation of the Leonard–Hearns fight, proclaiming to the media that the Kalule–Leonard bout would go down as one of the biggest blunders in boxing history. I'm somewhat sorry this Leonard-Kalule fight is taking place."

As part of the agreement Hearns was added to the card as the co-main event defending his WBA welterweight title against virtual unknown Pablo Baez. Originally, Baez was selected to face Hearns in a 10-round non-title bout in what was supposed to be no more than a tune-up for Hearns before facing Leonard in September. However, not happy with taking a backseat in the promotion of the event while Leonard participated in the main event, Hearns and his manager/trainer Emanuel Steward approached Arum about making his fight with Baez a title fight which would then be upgraded to co-main event status, which Arum accepted. Arum also agreed for Hearns to receive equal billing with Leonard on the fight posters but declined Hearns and Steward's request to have his fight with Baez go on last.

== Card Details ==
=== Hearns vs. Baez ===
The co featured bout saw Hearns make the 3rd defence of his title, stopping the No. 9 ranked Baez in the 4th round.

Preceded by vs. Randy Shields	Thomas Hearns's bouts 25 June 1981	Succeeded by vs. Ray Leonard
Preceded by vs. Rudy Barro	Pablo Baez's bouts 25 June 1981	Succeeded by vs. Clayton Hires

=== Kalule vs. Leonard ===
Leonard had little trouble with Kalule through the first six rounds of the fight, abandoning his usual elusive style and instead fought Kalule aggressively, controlling the fight with his left jab to start and hurting Kalule several times over the early part of the bout with power punches. However, Kalule came on strong in the seventh round and stunned him midway through the round after landing a short right hand flush to Leonard's head. The two fighters fought a close eighth round and continued to trade punches with one another into the ninth, however, Leonard stunned Kalule with a right towards the end of the round. Kalule tried to clinch Leonard, but Leonard landed a three-punch combination that sent Kalule down on his back with seconds left. Though Kalule was able to get back up as the round ended, he told referee Carlos Berrocal that he did not want to continue, giving Leonard the victory by technical knockout.

== Fight card ==
Confirmed bouts:

Weight Class	Weight		vs.		Method	Round	Notes
Light Middleweight	154 lbs.	Ray Leonard	def.	Ayub Kalule (c)	TKO	9/15	^{note 1}
Welterweight	147 lbs.	Thomas Hearns (c)	def.	Pablo Baez	TKO	4/15	^{note 2}
Welterweight	147 lbs.	Pipino Cuevas	def.	Jørgen Hansen	TKO	1/10
Light Middleweight	154 lbs.	Tony Ayala Jr.	def.	Jerry Cheatham	TKO	6/10
Welterweight	147 lbs.	Milton McCrory	def.	Steve Hearon	TKO	8/10
Middleweight	160 lbs.	Tadashi Mihara	def.	Ramon Dionisio	KO	5/10

^Note 1 For WBA and The Ring Light Middleweight Titles
^Note 2 For WBA Welterweight Title

== Broadcasting ==
Country	Broadcaster
United Kingdom	ITV
United States	NBC

Preceded by vs. Pat Hallacy	Ayub Kalule's bouts 25 June 1981	Succeeded by vs. Andoni Amana
Preceded by vs. Larry Bonds	Ray Leonard's bouts 25 June 1981	Succeeded by vs. Thomas Hearns
