= Elio Díaz =

Venezuelan boxer

Personal information
- Nationality: Venezuelan
- Born: 17 December 1962 (age 62)

Sport
- Sport: Boxing

Elio Díaz (born 17 December 1962) is a Venezuelan boxer. He competed in the men's welterweight event at the 1980 Summer Olympics. At the 1980 Summer Olympics, he lost to Lucas Msomba of Tanzania.
