= Patrick Davitt =

Irish boxer

Personal information
- Nationality: Irish
- Born: 19 August 1958 (age 66); Dublin, Ireland

Sport
- Sport: Boxing

Patrick Davitt (born 19 August 1958) is an Irish boxer. He competed in the men's welterweight event at the 1980 Summer Olympics.
