= Clinton McKenzie =

English boxer

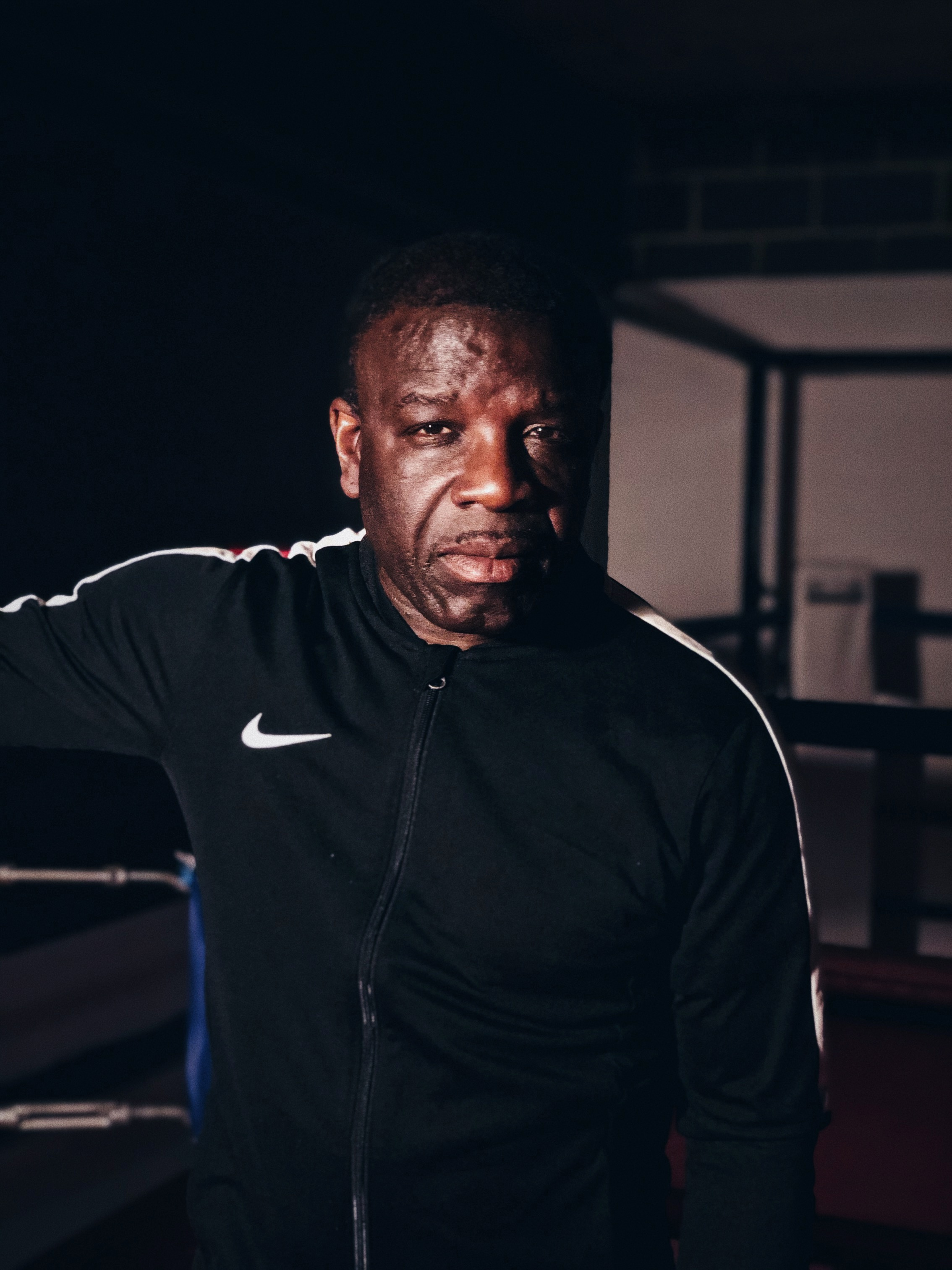
- McKenzie in 2019

Personal information
- Nationality: British
- Born: Clinton McKenzie; 15 September 1955 (age 70) Clarendon, Jamaica
- Weight: light welterweight

Boxing career
- Stance: Southpaw

Boxing record
- Total fights: 50
- Wins: 36
- Win by KO: 12
- Losses: 14
- Draws: 0
- No contests: 0

Clinton McKenzie (born 15 September 1955) is a former British professional boxer. He fought in the light welterweight division and became the British light welterweight title holder and briefly held the European title.

== Background ==
McKenzie was born in Clarendon, Jamaica, the oldest of seven children. The McKenzie family emigrated to the United Kingdom when Clinton was nine years of age.

He is the brother of former three-weight world champion boxer Duke McKenzie and former amateur boxer and politician Winston McKenzie, father of footballer-turn boxer Leon McKenzie he is also the adoptive father to professional boxer and Big Brother UK 2009 housemate, Angel McKenzie.

== Amateur career ==
McKenzie represented England and Great Britain throughout his amateur career which culminated in representing Great Britain at the 1976 Olympics in Montreal, Canada. McKenzie won his first two fights before losing to eventual gold medal winner Sugar Ray Leonard. He won the 1976 Amateur Boxing Association British light-welterweight title, when boxing out of the Sir Philip Game ABC.

=== Olympic results ===
1976 (as a light welterweight)

- Defeated Daniele Zappaterra (ITA), 5:0
- Defeated Ismael Martínez (PUR), 3:2
- Lost to Ray Leonard (USA), 5:0

He is the father of Christopher Clinton James McKenzie born 1994 and also the father of Alexandra Elizabeth McKenzie born 1990, mother of Rebecca Lizanne Cunningham born 1970.

== Professional career ==
Following the publicity of the Olympic Games, McKenzie left amateur boxing to turn professional in October 1976, winning his first fight at the York Hall, Bethnal Green, London, in which McKenzie beat Jimmy King on points over eight rounds.

McKenzie fought for his first title belt, the vacant British light welterweight title, in October 1978 which he won with a ten-round knockout win over Jim Montague in Belfast, Northern Ireland. The following year, McKenzie lost the title at the Wembley Conference Centre to Colin Powers on points but later that year defeated Powers at the same venue to regain the title.
