= Sabahattin Burcu =

Turkish boxer

Personal information
- Nationality: Turkish
- Born: 27 May 1951 (age 74)

Sport
- Sport: Boxing

Sabahattin Burcu (born 27 May 1951) is a Turkish boxer. He competed in the men's light welterweight event at the 1976 Summer Olympics.
