= Kebede Sahilu =

Ethiopian boxer (born 1955)

Personal information
- Nationality: Ethiopian
- Born: 9 December 1955 (age 69)

Sport
- Sport: Boxing

Kebede Sahilu (born 9 December 1955) is an Ethiopian boxer. He competed in the men's welterweight event at the 1980 Summer Olympics.
