= Imre Csjef =

Hungarian boxer

Personal information
- Nationality: Hungarian
- Born: 11 February 1960 (age 66) Budapest, Hungary

Sport
- Sport: Boxing

Imre Csjef (born 11 February 1960) is a Hungarian boxer. He competed in the men's welterweight event at the 1980 Summer Olympics. A film was made about him and his brother, also a boxer.
