= Luis Portillo (boxer) =

Argentine boxer

Personal information
- Nationality: Argentine
- Born: 29 September 1956 (age 68)

Sport
- Sport: Boxing

Luis Portillo (born 29 September 1956) is an Argentine boxer. He competed in the men's light welterweight event at the 1976 Summer Olympics.
