= Ionel Budușan =

Romanian boxer

Personal information
- Nationality: Romanian
- Born: 24 October 1954 (age 70)

Sport
- Sport: Boxing

Ionel Budușan (born 24 October 1954) is a Romanian boxer. He competed in the men's welterweight event at the 1980 Summer Olympics.
