= Jesús Sánchez (boxer) =

Dominican Republic boxer (born 1953)

Personal information
- Nationality: Dominican
- Born: 1 March 1953 (age 72)

Sport
- Sport: Boxing

Jesús Sánchez (born 1 March 1953) is a Dominican Republic boxer. He competed in the men's light welterweight event at the 1976 Summer Olympics.
