= Peter Talanti =

Zambian boxer

Personal information
- Nationality: Zambian

Sport
- Sport: Boxing

Peter Talanti is a Zambian boxer. He competed in the men's welterweight event at the 1980 Summer Olympics.
