= Lasse Friman =

Finnish boxer

Personal information
- Nationality: Finnish
- Born: 3 November 1954 (age 70); Helsinki, Finland

Sport
- Sport: Boxing

Lasse Friman (born 3 November 1954) is a Finnish boxer. He competed in the men's light welterweight event at the 1976 Summer Olympics.
