= Ulrich Beyer =

East German boxer (1947–1988)

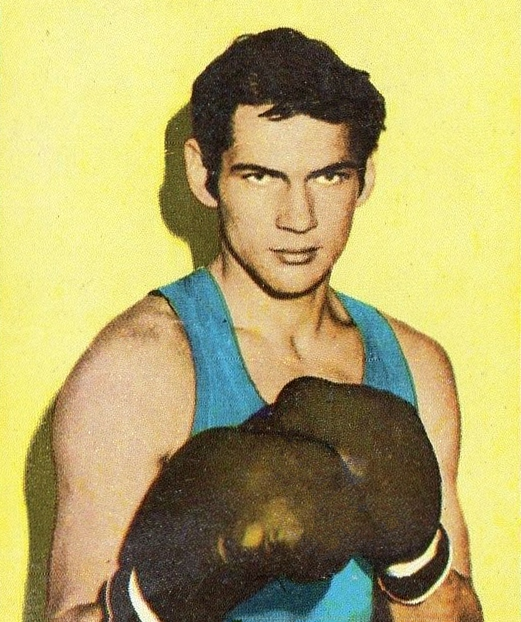
- Ulrich Beyer in 1972

Personal information
- Born: 23 July 1947 Röddelin, Soviet occupation zone in Germany
- Died: 20 October 1988 (aged 41) Frankfurt an der Oder, East Germany
- Height: 172 cm (5 ft 8 in)

Sport
- Sport: Boxing
- Club: ASK Vorwärts Frankfurt
Medal record
Representing East Germany
World Amateur Boxing Championships
Bronze medal – third place	1974 Havana	-63.5 kg
European Amateur Boxing Championships
Gold medal – first place	1971 Madrid	-63.5 kg
Bronze medal – third place	1973 Belgrade	-63.5 kg
Bronze medal – third place	1975 Katowice	-63.5 kg
Silver medal – second place	1977 Halle	-63.5 kg

Ulrich Beyer (23 July 1947 – 20 October 1988) was an amateur light-welterweight boxer from East Germany. Between 1971 and 1977 he won four medals at the European championships, including a gold in 1971; at the 1974 World Championships he placed third. He competed at the 1972 and 1976 Olympics, and was eliminated by Sugar Ray Seales in the first bout in 1972 and by Sugar Ray Leonard in a quarterfinal in 1976.

== 1976 Olympic results ==
Below is the record of Ulrich Beyer, an East German light welterweight boxer who competed at the 1976 Montreal Olympics:

- Round of 64: defeated C.C. Machaiah (India) by decision, 5-0
- Round of 32: defeated Jesus Navas (Venezuela) by decision, 5-0
- Round of 16: defeated Francisco de Jesus (Brazil) by decision, 5-0
- Quarterfinal: lost to Ray Leonard (United States) by decision, 0-5
