= Valery Limasov =

Russian boxer

Personal information
- Nationality: Russian
- Born: 6 December 1955 (age 70) Ufa, Russian SFSR, Soviet Union

Sport
- Sport: Boxing
Medal record
Men's boxing
Representing the Soviet Union
European Amateur Championships
Gold medal – first place	1975 Spodek	Light Welterweight
Gold medal – first place	1977 Halle	Welterweight

Valery Limasov (born 6 December 1955) is a Russian boxer. He competed in the men's light welterweight event at the 1976 Summer Olympics, Master of Sports of the USSR of international class (1974), Honoured Master of Sports of the USSR in boxing (1977).
