= József Nagy (boxer, born 1953) =

Hungarian boxer

Personal information
- Nationality: Hungarian
- Born: 14 July 1953 (age 72) Vámosatya, Hungary

Sport
- Sport: Boxing
Medal record
Men's boxing
Representing Hungary
European championships
Silver medal – second place	1975 Katowice	Light-Welterweight

József Nagy (born 14 July 1953) is a Hungarian boxer. He competed in the men's light welterweight event at the 1976 Summer Olympics.
