= Carlos Palomino =

Mexican boxer (born 1949)

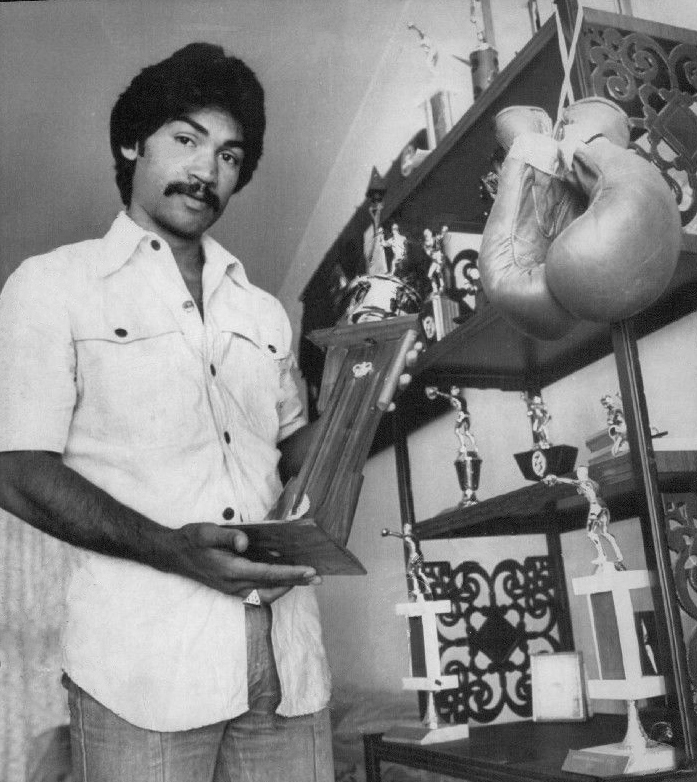
- Palomino in 1976

Personal information
- Nickname: King
- Born: Carlos Palomino; August 10, 1949 (age 77) San Luis Río Colorado, Sonora, Mexico
- Height: 5 ft 9 in (177 cm)
- Weight: Light middleweight Welterweight; Light welterweight

Boxing career
- Reach: 71 in (181 cm)
- Stance: Orthodox

Boxing record
- Total fights: 38
- Wins: 31
- Win by KO: 19
- Losses: 4
- Draws: 3
- No contests: 0

Carlos Palomino (born August 10, 1949) is a Mexican former professional boxer. Palomino is a former World Welterweight Champion and member of the International Boxing Hall of Fame. Palomino is also an actor who has been featured in several television shows and films. He achieved a considerable amount of fame during the 1970s, especially among Mexican and Southern California fans.

== Early life ==
He legally moved to Los Angeles, California from his native Mexico when he was ten years old.

== Amateur boxing career ==
Palomino was an All-U.S. Army champion in 1971 and 1972. As an amateur, Palomino won the 1972 National AAU Light Welterweight Champion at 137 lb., defeating eventual Olympic gold medalist Ray Seales. He was discharged from the Army later that year and enrolled at Orange Coast College and later Long Beach State, where he obtained a degree.

== Professional boxing career ==
In 1972, his name was becoming better known in California. This was likely caused by the number of his fights taking place there. He won five fights (one by knockout) in 1973.

In 1974, Palomino went through an increment in quality of opposition. He won six fights and lost one. He beat David Arellano twice, by a decision in ten and by knockout in nine, as well as Tommy Howard, by decision in ten, but he lost to Andy Price, who was a title contender at the time, by decision in ten in San Diego.

In 1975, he won four fights, and drew in two. He and Zovek Baraja had two bouts that year, the first one resulting in a ten-round draw and the second one being a nine-round knockout win for Palomino. He also drew with Hedgemon Lewis.

=== WBC Welterweight Championship ===
After winning two fights in 1976, Palomino found himself and his trainers travelling to London, where an internationally televised world championship bout awaited him against WBC world Welterweight champion John H. Stracey, a British boxing teacher who had dethroned José Nápoles as world champion. Palomino became a world champion on the night of June 22 of that year at Wembley Arena, after Stracey eventually succumbed to a blistering body attack and was put on the canvas twice from left hooks to the liver. Many Mexicans who viewed Nápoles, a Cuban born resident of Mexico, as another countryman, saw this as a revenge from Stracey.

He waited six months for his next fight, against another very popular boxer of Mexican background: cross-town rival Armando Muñíz. This was a fight that had many fans guessing who'd win it for months before it happened, but it also made history in the boxing books: When Palomino and Muñíz met, on January 21, 1977, it was the first time in boxing history two college graduates met for a world title. Palomino earned a degree in recreation administration from Long Beach State, while Muniz had graduated from Cal State Los Angeles, where he majored in Spanish and minored in math, and was working toward a graduate degree in administration. Palomino and Muniz (now a high school teacher in California) fought what the book The Ring: Boxing in the 20th. Century has described as one of the best fights of 1977. After 14 rounds, all three judges had the fight tied on their scorecards, but Palomino scored two knockdowns in the fifteenth and final round and he retained the world title by a knockout in that final round. A return to London resulted in an 11th-round knockout victory over Dave Boy Green, after which he defended against Everaldo Costa Azevedo and Jose Palacios, Azevedo being defeated by decision in fifteen and Palacios by knockout in thirteen. Azevedo was actually beating Palomino for the first 10 rounds of the fight.

In 1978, he defended his crown with a win over Ryu Sorimachi by a knockout in seven, a knockout in nine over Mimoun Mohatar, and a decision in fifteen in his long-awaited rematch with Muniz.

His championship run ended in 1979, when he traveled to Puerto Rico, where he was defeated on January 13 by hometown boxer Wilfred Benítez via a controversial fifteen-round split decision. Referee Zach Clayton scored the fight 145–142 in Palomino's favor, but judges Jay Edson and Harry Gibbs disagreed. Edson scored the bout 146-142 for Benítez. Gibbs also scored for Benítez, 146–143.

=== Palomino vs. Durán ===
In his next fight, Palomino met legendary Roberto Durán on June 22 of that year at Madison Square Gardens, in another nationally televised bout, as part of the Larry Holmes–Mike Weaver world Heavyweight championship bout's undercard. Palomino lost to Duran by decision in ten rounds, and he announced his retirement from boxing right away.

=== Boxing comeback ===
Palomino began his comeback on January 10, 1997, beating Ismaél Díaz by a knockout in round nine. He won four fights that year, including one over former world champion Rene Arredondo, but when he lost by decision in ten to former Oscar De La Hoya world title challenger Wilfredo Rivera on May 30, 1998, he decided to retire for good, and has stayed in retirement ever since.

== After boxing ==
=== Acting career ===
In 1978 while still the WBC Welterweight Champion, Palomino appeared as 'Carlos Navarone' in the ABC sitcom Taxi. Appearing in the second episode of the opening season ("One-Punch Banta"), he spars with Tony Banta (Tony Danza – himself a former professional boxer with a 9–3 record) and takes a dive. Palomino accidentally hits Danza for real during one scene. Palomino appears as himself in an episode of "The White Shadow" in 1979. In 1980, Miller Lite beer signed Palomino as a spokesman as part of a television commercial campaign that also included Walt Frazier and other noted athletes. As a consequence of the enjoyable experience and the media exposure that followed, he decided to launch a career as an actor. He participated in a number of movies, such as Fists of Steel, and television series, before deciding to launch a boxing comeback at the age of 48, in 1997.

Palomino appeared on Star Trek: Voyager episode "The Fight". This episode was original aired on March 24, 1999.

Palomino was elected as chairman of the California State Athletic Commission, where he performed for a few years. He is now involved in charity work, most notably Tony Baltazar's charity organization, and he travels around the United States to attend charity events and do autograph shows.

=== IBHF ===
Palomino was selected to the International Boxing Hall of Fame on January 8, 2004. He was inducted on June 13.

=== Personal life ===
On March 14, 1980, his younger brother, Paul Palomino – a member of the U.S. boxing team en route to Poland for a competition – was killed in the crash of LOT Polish Airlines Flight 007.

On December 19, 2008, Palomino's girlfriend, Daliene Ingram, was featured in an episode of Are You Smarter Than A Fifth Grader?. Her daughter Alexa, a fifth grader, was the extra classmate at the Mystery Desk for the occasion.

== Professional boxing record ==
38 fights	31 wins	4 losses
By knockout	19	0
By decision	12	4
Draws	3	

No.	Result	Record	Opponent	Type	Round	Date	Location	Notes
38	Loss	31–4–3	Wilfredo Rivera	UD	10	May 30, 1998	Olympic Auditorium, Los Angeles, California, U.S.	
37	Win	31–3–3	Eric Ramon Vazquez	KO	9 (10)	Oct 26, 1997	Bakersfield, California, U.S.	
36	Win	30–3–3	René Arredondo	KO	1 (10)	Jun 08, 1997	Hollywood Palladium, Hollywood, California, U.S.	
35	Win	29–3–3	Wilbur Garst	KO	2 (?)	May 9, 1997	Hollywood Palladium, Hollywood, California, U.S.	
34	Win	28–3–3	Ismael Diaz	RTD	8 (10)	Jan 10, 1997	Hollywood Palladium, Hollywood, California, U.S.	
33	Loss	27–3–3	Roberto Durán	UD	10	Jun 22, 1979	Madison Square Garden, New York City, New York, U.S.	
32	Loss	27–2–3	Wilfred Benítez	SD	15	Jan 14, 1979	Hiram Bithorn Stadium, San Juan, Puerto Rico	Lost WBC and The Ring welterweight titles
31	Win	27–1–3	Armando Muñíz	UD	15	May 27, 1978	Olympic Auditorium, Los Angeles, California, U.S.	Retained WBC and The Ring welterweight titles
30	Win	26–1–3	Mimoun Mohatar	TKO	9 (15)	Mar 18, 1978	The Aladdin, Las Vegas, Nevada, U.S.	Retained WBC and The Ring welterweight titles
29	Win	25–1–3	Ryu Sorimachi	KO	7 (15)	Feb 11, 1978	Hilton Hotel, Las Vegas, Nevada, U.S.	Retained WBC and The Ring welterweight titles
28	Win	24–1–3	Jose Palacios	KO	13 (15)	Dec 10, 1977	Olympic Auditorium, Los Angeles, California, U.S.	Retained WBC and The Ring welterweight titles
27	Win	23–1–3	Everaldo Costa Azevedo	UD	15	Sep 13, 1977	Olympic Auditorium, Los Angeles, California, U.S.	Retained WBC and The Ring welterweight titles
26	Win	22–1–3	Dave Boy Green	KO	11 (15)	Jun 14, 1977	Empire Pool, London, England, U.K.	Retained WBC and The Ring welterweight titles
25	Win	21–1–3	Armando Muñíz	TKO	15 (15)	Jan 21, 1977	Olympic Auditorium, Los Angeles, California, U.S.	Retained WBC and The Ring welterweight titles
24	Win	20–1–3	John H. Stracey	TKO	12 (15)	Jun 22, 1976	Empire Pool, London, England, U.K.	Won WBC and The Ring welterweight titles
23	Win	19–1–3	Toshiharu Nambu	TKO	2 (10)	Apr 29, 1976	Olympic Auditorium, Los Angeles, California, U.S.	
22	Win	18–1–3	Mike Avans	UD	10	Feb 12, 1976	Olympic Auditorium, Los Angeles, California, U.S.	
21	Draw	17–1–3	Hedgemon Lewis	MD	10	Nov 11, 1975	Olympic Auditorium, Los Angeles, California, U.S.	
20	Win	17–1–2	Eddie Alexander	TKO	5 (10)	Oct 25, 1975	Olympic Auditorium, Los Angeles, California, U.S.	
19	Win	16–1–2	Johnny Pinedo	KO	2 (10)	Jul 19, 1975	Olympic Auditorium, Los Angeles, California, U.S.	
18	Win	15–1–2	Roger Buckskin	UD	10	May 22, 1975	Olympic Auditorium, Los Angeles, California, U.S.	
17	Win	14–1–2	Zovek Barajas	TKO	9 (10)	Mar 27, 1975	Olympic Auditorium, Los Angeles, California, U.S.	
16	Draw	13–1–2	Zovek Barajas	MD	10	Feb 13, 1975	Olympic Auditorium, Los Angeles, California, U.S.	
15	Win	13–1–1	Tommy Howard	UD	10	Dec 19, 1974	Olympic Auditorium, Los Angeles, California, U.S.	
14	Win	12–1–1	Jose Miranda	KO	6 (10)	Oct 24, 1974	Olympic Auditorium, Los Angeles, California, U.S.	
13	Win	11–1–1	Nelson Ruiz	TKO	6 (10)	Oct 10, 1974	Olympic Auditorium, Los Angeles, California, U.S.	
12	Loss	10–1–1	Andy Price	SD	10	Aug 02, 1974	Coliseum, San Diego, California, U.S.	
11	Win	10–0–1	David Arellano	KO	9 (10)	Jun 14, 1974	Coliseum, San Diego, California, U.S.	
10	Win	9–0–1	Juan Garza	KO	2 (8)	May 23, 1974	Olympic Auditorium, Los Angeles, California, U.S.	
9	Win	8–0–1	David Arellano	PTS	8	May 3, 1974	Coliseum, San Diego, California, U.S.	
8	Win	7–0–1	Tommy Coulson	PTS	6	Apr 12, 1973	Olympic Auditorium, Los Angeles, California, U.S.	
7	Win	6–0–1	Lalo Barriente	PTS	6	Mar 29, 1973	Olympic Auditorium, Los Angeles, California, U.S.	
6	Win	5–0–1	Rosario Zavala	PTS	6	Mar 01, 1973	Olympic Auditorium, Los Angeles, California, U.S.	
5	Win	4–0–1	Ramon Solitaro	KO	3 (6)	Feb 01, 1973	Olympic Auditorium, Los Angeles, California, U.S.	
4	Win	3–0–1	Tim Walker	PTS	6	Jan 19, 1973	Arena, San Bernardino, California, U.S.	
3	Draw	2–0–1	Ted Liggett	PTS	4	Nov 16, 1972	Olympic Auditorium, Los Angeles, California, U.S.	
2	Win	2–0	Javier Martinez	PTS	4	Oct 05, 1972	Olympic Auditorium, Los Angeles, California, U.S.	
1	Win	1–0	Javier Martinez	PTS	4	Sep 14, 1972	Olympic Auditorium, Los Angeles, California, U.S.	

== See also ==
- List of Mexican boxing world champions
- List of world welterweight boxing champions

Sporting positions
Amateur boxing titles
Previous: Sugar Ray Seales	U.S. light welterweight champion 1972	Next: Randy Shields
World boxing titles
Preceded by John H. Stracey	WBC welterweight champion June 22, 1976 - January 14, 1979	Succeeded by Wilfred Benítez
Preceded by John H. Stracey	The Ring welterweight champion June 22, 1976 - January 14, 1979	Succeeded by Wilfred Benítez
