= Menetrey =

Menetrey is a surname. Notable people with the surname include:

- Louis C. Menetrey (1929–2009), United States general
- Roger Menetrey (born 1945), French professional boxer
