= Billy Backus =

American boxer

Personal information
- Nationality: American
- Born: Harold William Backus; March 5, 1943 (age 83) Canastota, New York
- Weight: Welterweight

Boxing career
- Stance: Southpaw

Boxing record
- Total fights: 73
- Wins: 48
- Win by KO: 22
- Losses: 20
- Draws: 5

Billy Backus (born March 5, 1943) is an American former Undisputed World Welterweight Champion professional boxer. In the summer of 2006 Backus retired from his correctional facility job and moved to South Carolina.

== Early boxing career ==
Backus, who is the nephew of boxing legend and former world champion Carmen Basilio, started his career by winning only 7 of his first 19 bouts. In 1964, things looked promising when he won four bouts in a row, but then he suffered a three fight losing streak. At this point of his career, he had a record of 8 wins, 7 losses and 3 draws and he retired from boxing. To make things worse, he had lost his last fight, against Rudy Richardson, on his twenty-second birthday.

== Rise to prominence ==
Backus resumed his boxing career in 1966, but probably never in his wildest dreams could he have envisioned what happened next: in his comeback bout, he knocked out Tod Purtell in the first round, and that marked his embarcation on a seven-fight winning streak that included avenging an earlier loss to Dick French. That streak was broken by a defeat at the hands of Percy Pugh in New Orleans, but soon he started on another winning streak, eight in a row, including two over Pugh. Then, Pugh broke his winning streak once again, beating him in 15 rounds, once again at New Orleans. After splitting two fights with Jerry Pellegrini and drawing in four rounds with Ricky Ortiz, Backus embarked on another winning streak, including an eight-round knockout over Ortiz in a rematch.

== World Welterweight Title Bout ==
After that last streak, Backus was ranked among the top ten Welterweight challengers of the world at number 10. The year was 1970 and Mexico's José Nápoles had earned the right to make an optional defense of his world title (meaning he could pick any challenger among the top ten to defend against). His management, figuring they'd have an easy fight ahead of them, picked Backus as the challenger for this optional title bout. But Backus landed a punch that opened a cut over Nápoles' eye in round one, causing Nápoles to bleed profusely, and the fight was stopped in round four. Since the cut had been ruled to be caused by a punch, Backus was declared winner by a technical knockout, and he had realized a dream that many fans never thought he would: he had become the world's Welterweight champion. His uncle Basilio, watching from ringside, said: "Billy winning the world title is the best thing ever to happen in my life, even better than me winning the world title."

Billy won two non-title fights, including one over Robert Gallois in Paris, and then had a rematch with Nápoles in Los Angeles. This time Nápoles returned the favor, knocking Backus out in the eighth round and regaining his title.

== Career decline ==
He finished 1971 with a ten-round decision win over Jose Gabino, and went 3–2 in 1972, losing two fifteen-round decisions to world title challenger Hedgemon Lewis. He lost 3 of 4 bouts in 1973, and went on a European tour in 1974, winning 2 and losing 2 in Paris and Berlin. In 1975, he went to Australia and lost by a knockout in five to Rocky Mattioli, and then he came back to the States, where he beat Marc Gervais by a knockout in ten. This marked the start of another 9 fight winning streak, which led the WBA to make him their number one challenger. After drawing in twelve rounds with Everaldo Acosta Acevedo, he had a chance at regaining the world welterweight title when faced against world champion Pipino Cuevas of Mexico, once again in Los Angeles. After losing by quitting on his stool in the first round, Backus then announced his retirement from boxing for good.

Although he isn't a member of the International Boxing Hall of Fame (unlike his uncle Basilio, who is), in 1990, Ed Brophy and some Canastota businessmen came up with the idea to build the hall of fame in Canastota, to honor Canastota's two native world champions: Basilio and Backus.

In 2010, the award nominated "Title Town USA, Boxing in Upstate New York" by noted historian Mark Allen Baker was published by The History Press in 2010 and supports Canastota, New York as the epicenter of Upstate New York's rich boxing heritage. The book includes chapters on both Carmen Basilio and Billy Backus. The introduction was written by Edward P. Brophy, Executive Director of the International Boxing Hall of Fame .

Backus had a final record of 48 wins, 20 losses and 5 draws, with 22 wins by knockout.

== Professional boxing record ==
| 74 fights | 49 wins | 20 losses |
|---|---|---|
| By knockout | 23 | 5 |
| By decision | 26 | 15 |
| Draws | 5 | |

| No. | Result | Record | Opponent | Type | Round | Date | Location | Notes |
|---|---|---|---|---|---|---|---|---|
| 74 | Loss | 49–20–5 | Pipino Cuevas | RTD | 1 (15) | May 20, 1978 | Forum, Inglewood, California, US | For WBA welterweight title |
| 73 | Draw | 49–19–5 | Everaldo Costa Azevedo | SD | 12 | November 19, 1977 | War Memorial Auditorium, Syracuse, New York, US | |
| 72 | Win | 49–19–4 | Joe Grier | UD | 10 | August 25, 1977 | War Memorial Auditorium, Syracuse, New York, US | |
| 71 | Win | 48–19–4 | Rafael Rodriguez | UD | 12 | June 3, 1977 | War Memorial Auditorium, Syracuse, New York, US | |
| 70 | Win | 47–19–4 | Roy Barrientos | UD | 10 | April 8, 1977 | War Memorial Auditorium, Syracuse, New York, US | |
| 69 | Win | 46–19–4 | Justice Ortiz | UD | 10 | January 27, 1977 | War Memorial Auditorium, Syracuse, New York, US | |
| 68 | Win | 45–19–4 | Tony Lopes | TKO | 9 (10) | November 20, 1976 | War Memorial Auditorium, Utica, New York, US | |
| 67 | Win | 44–19–4 | Pablo Rodriguez | UD | 10 | September 11, 1976 | Utica Memorial Auditorium, Utica, New York, US | |
| 66 | Win | 43–19–4 | Jose Papo Melendez | UD | 10 | May 28, 1976 | Colonie Coliseum, Latham, New York, US | |
| 65 | Win | 42–19–4 | Angel Robinson Garcia | UD | 10 | April 3, 1976 | War Memorial Auditorium, Utica, New York, US | |
| 64 | Win | 41–19–4 | Pablo Rodriguez | UD | 10 | January 24, 1976 | War Memorial Auditorium, Syracuse, New York, US | |
| 63 | Win | 40–19–4 | Marc Gervais | KO | 10 (10) | August 23, 1975 | Broome County Arena, Binghamton, New York, US | |
| 62 | Loss | 39–19–4 | Rocky Mattioli | TKO | 5 (10) | April 11, 1975 | Festival Hall, Melbourne, Victoria, Australia | |
| 61 | Loss | 39–18–4 | Eckhard Dagge | TKO | 3 (10) | June 20, 1974 | Germany | |
| 60 | Win | 39–17–4 | Jacques Kechichian | RTD | 5 (10) | April 30, 1974 | Paris, France | |
| 59 | Loss | 38–17–4 | Roger Menetrey | PTS | 12 | March 18, 1974 | Palais des Sports, Paris, France, France | |
| 58 | Win | 38–16–4 | Roger Zami | TKO | 9 (10) | January 21, 1974 | Palais des Sports, Paris, France, France | |
| 57 | Loss | 37–16–4 | Zovek Barajas | TKO | 3 (10) | December 6, 1973 | Olympic Auditorium, Los Angeles, California, US | |
| 56 | Win | 37–15–4 | Al Romano | KO | 3 (10) | August 4, 1973 | Three Rivers Inn, Syracuse, New York, US | |
| 55 | Loss | 36–15–4 | Miguel Barreto | MD | 12 | August 4, 1973 | Felt Forum, New York City, New York, US | |
| 54 | Loss | 36–14–4 | Jack Tillman | UD | 12 | February 13, 1973 | Civic Center, Baltimore, Maryland, US | For WBA North American welterweight title |
| 53 | Loss | 36–13–4 | Hedgemon Lewis | UD | 15 | December 8, 1972 | War Memorial Auditorium, Utica, New York, US | For NYSAC welterweight title |
| 52 | Win | 36–12–4 | Dorman Crawford | TKO | 8 (10) | September 23, 1972 | War Memorial Auditorium, Utica, New York, US | |
| 51 | Loss | 35–12–4 | Hedgemon Lewis | UD | 15 | June 6, 1972 | War Memorial Auditorium, Utica, New York, US | For vacant NYSAC welterweight title |
| 50 | Win | 35–11–4 | Danny McAloon | UD | 12 | April 14, 1972 | War Memorial Auditorium, Utica, New York, US | |
| 49 | Win | 34–11–4 | Irish Pat Murphy | TKO | 7 (10) | February 12, 1972 | War Memorial Auditorium, Utica, New York, US | |
| 48 | Win | 33–11–4 | Jose Gabino | UD | 10 | December 10, 1971 | War Memorial Auditorium, Utica, New York, US | |
| 47 | Loss | 32–11–4 | José Nápoles | TKO | 8 (15) | June 4, 1971 | Forum, Inglewood, California, US | Lost WBA, WBC, and The Ring welterweight titles |
| 46 | Win | 32–10–4 | Robert Gallois | MD | 10 | March 15, 1971 | Palais des Sports, Paris, France, France | |
| 45 | Win | 31–10–4 | Bobby Williams | UD | 12 | January 23, 1971 | War Memorial Auditorium, Syracuse, New York, US | |
| 44 | Win | 30–10–4 | José Nápoles | TKO | 4 (15) | December 3, 1970 | War Memorial Auditorium, Syracuse, New York, US | Won WBA, WBC, and The Ring welterweight titles |
| 43 | Win | 29–10–4 | Denny Stiletto | KO | 8 (10) | October 3, 1970 | War Memorial Auditorium, Syracuse, New York, US | |
| 42 | Win | 28–10–4 | Manuel Gonzalez | UD | 10 | July 22, 1970 | War Memorial Auditorium, Syracuse, New York, US | |
| 41 | Win | 27–10–4 | Frank Steele | UD | 10 | June 15, 1970 | War Memorial Auditorium, Syracuse, New York, US | |
| 40 | Win | 26–10–4 | Manuel Burgo | UD | 10 | March 24, 1970 | War Memorial Auditorium, Syracuse, New York, US | |
| 39 | Win | 25–10–4 | Ricky Ortiz | TKO | 8 (10) | January 30, 1970 | War Memorial Auditorium, Syracuse, New York, US | Won New York State welterweight title |
| 38 | Draw | 24–10–4 | Ricky Ortiz | MD | 10 | October 31, 1969 | War Memorial Auditorium, Syracuse, New York, US | |
| 37 | Win | 24–10–3 | Jerry Pellegrini | UD | 10 | September 19, 1969 | War Memorial Auditorium, Syracuse, New York, US | |
| 36 | Loss | 23–10–3 | Jerry Pellegrini | UD | 10 | July 21, 1969 | Municipal Auditorium, New Orleans, Louisiana, US | |
| 35 | Loss | 23–9–3 | Percy Pugh | UD | 15 | June 16, 1969 | Rivergate Exhibition Hall, New Orleans, Louisiana, US | |
| 34 | Win | 23–8–3 | Percy Pugh | UD | 12 | April 25, 1969 | War Memorial Auditorium, Syracuse, New York, US | |
| 33 | Win | 22–8–3 | CL Lewis | TKO | 7 (10) | March 17, 1969 | War Memorial Auditorium, Syracuse, New York, US | |
| 32 | Win | 21–8–3 | Percy Pugh | SD | 12 | January 24, 1969 | War Memorial Auditorium, Syracuse, New York, US | |
| 31 | Win | 20–8–3 | Freddie Cobb | TKO | 5 (10) | December 14, 1968 | War Memorial Auditorium, Syracuse, New York, US | |
| 30 | Win | 19–8–3 | Vince Shomo | TKO | 8 (10) | November 16, 1968 | War Memorial Auditorium, Syracuse, New York, US | |
| 29 | Win | 18–8–3 | Johnny Brooks | UD | 10 | October 7, 1968 | Municipal Auditorium, New Orleans, Louisiana, US | |
| 28 | Win | 17–8–3 | Curtis Phillips | TKO | 7 (10) | September 14, 1968 | War Memorial Auditorium, Syracuse, New York, US | |
| 27 | Win | 16–8–3 | Jerry Pellegrini | SD | 10 | July 29, 1968 | Municipal Auditorium, New Orleans, Louisiana, US | |
| 26 | Loss | 15–8–3 | Percy Pugh | UD | 10 | June 3, 1968 | Municipal Auditorium, New Orleans, Louisiana, US | |
| 25 | Win | 15–7–3 | Dick French | TKO | 6 (10) | May 19, 1968 | War Memorial Auditorium, Syracuse, New York, US | |
| 24 | Win | 14–7–3 | Danny Andrews | UD | 10 | April 6, 1968 | War Memorial Auditorium, Syracuse, New York, US | |
| 23 | Win | 13–7–3 | Juan Ramos | UD | 10 | February 10, 1968 | War Memorial Auditorium, Syracuse, New York, US | |
| 22 | Win | 12–7–3 | Gene Herrick | TKO | 6 (10) | November 30, 1967 | Portland, Maine, US | |
| 21 | Win | 11–7–3 | Curtis Phillips | TKO | 6 (10) | November 24, 1967 | War Memorial Auditorium, Syracuse, New York, US | |
| 20 | Win | 10–7–3 | Ernie Robbins | KO | 3 (6) | October 23, 1967 | Mechanics Hall, Worcester, Massachusetts, US | |
| 19 | Win | 9–7–3 | Tod Purtell | KO | 1 (?) | October 16, 1967 | Worcester, Massachusetts, US | |
| 18 | Loss | 8–7–3 | Rudy Richardson | UD | 8 | May 5, 1965 | War Memorial Auditorium, Syracuse, New York, US | |
| 17 | Loss | 8–6–3 | Billy Anderson | PTS | 10 | October 30, 1964 | War Memorial Auditorium, Syracuse, New York, US | |
| 16 | Loss | 8–5–3 | Genaro Soto | PTS | 6 | July 17, 1964 | Madison Square Garden, New York City, New York, US | |
| 15 | Win | 8–4–3 | Colin Fraser | UD | 10 | May 19, 1964 | War Memorial Auditorium, Utica, New York, US | |
| 14 | Win | 7–4–3 | Lew Anderson | TKO | 5 (8) | April 18, 1964 | War Memorial Auditorium, Syracuse, New York, US | |
| 13 | Win | 6–4–3 | Dave Hilton Sr. | KO | 7 (8) | February 29, 1964 | War Memorial Auditorium, Syracuse, New York, US | |
| 12 | Win | 5–4–3 | Colin Fraser | RTD | 5 (8) | February 1, 1964 | War Memorial Auditorium, Syracuse, New York, US | |
| 11 | Loss | 4–4–3 | Billy Anderson | UD | 8 | December 19, 1963 | Mechanics Hall, Worcester, Massachusetts, US | |
| 10 | Loss | 4–3–3 | Fernand Chretien | UD | 10 | August 2, 1963 | Saint Anthony's Club, New Castle (Shawtown), Delaware, US | |
| 9 | Loss | 4–2–3 | Dick French | UD | 8 | February 28, 1963 | Mechanics Hall, Worcester, Massachusetts, US | |
| 8 | Draw | 4–1–3 | Marcel Bizien | PTS | 8 | January 23, 1963 | Plaza Ballroom, Paterson, New Jersey, US | |
| 7 | Draw | 4–1–2 | Mike Cortez | PTS | 4 | December 22, 1962 | Madison Square Garden, New York City, New York, US | |
| 6 | Loss | 4–1–1 | Luis Aponte Ortiz | PTS | 4 | November 24, 1962 | Gladiators' Arena, Totowa, New Jersey, US | |
| 5 | Win | 4–0–1 | Barney Barnez | PTS | 4 | June 22, 1962 | Totowa, New Jersey, US | |
| 4 | Win | 3–0–1 | Steve Gessler | PTS | 6 | June 6, 1962 | Saint-Jerome, Quebec, Canada | |
| 3 | Draw | 2–0–1 | Sugar Lawson | PTS | 4 | April 27, 1962 | Gladiators' Arena, Totowa, New Jersey, US | |
| 2 | Win | 2–0 | Randy Sanders | PTS | 4 | March 9, 1962 | Gladiators' Arena, Totowa, New Jersey, US | |
| 1 | Win | 1–0 | Ike Anthony | TKO | 2 (4) | September 16, 1961 | War Memorial Auditorium, Syracuse, New York, US New York, US | |

== Titles in boxing ==
=== Major world titles ===
- WBA welterweight champion (147 lbs)
- WBC welterweight champion (147 lbs)

=== The Ring magazine titles ===
- The Ring welterweight champion (147 lbs)

=== Regional/International titles ===
- New York State welterweight champion (147 lbs)

=== Undisputed titles ===
- Undisputed welterweight champion

== See also ==
- List of world welterweight boxing champions

Sporting positions
Regional boxing titles
| Vacant Title last held by Carmen Basilio | New York State welterweight champion January 30 – December 3, 1970; Won world title | Vacant Title next held by Nelson Ortiz |
World boxing titles
| Preceded by José Nápoles | WBA welterweight champion December 3, 1970 – June 4, 1971 | Succeeded by José Nápoles |
| Preceded by José Nápoles | WBC welterweight champion December 3, 1970 – June 4, 1971 | Succeeded by José Nápoles |
| Preceded by José Nápoles | The Ring welterweight champion December 3, 1970 – June 4, 1971 | Succeeded by José Nápoles |
| Preceded by José Nápoles | Undisputed welterweight champion December 3, 1970 – June 4, 1971 | Succeeded by José Nápoles |
Records
| Preceded by Tony DeMarco | Oldest living welterweight champion October 11, 2021 – present | Incumbent |
