= Armando Muñíz =

Retired Mexican-born American professional boxer

Armando "The Man" Muñíz
Personal information
- Nationality: American
- Born: Armando Muñíz; May 3, 1946 (age 80) Chihuahua, Chihuahua, Mexico
- Height: 5 ft 6 in (172 cm)
- Weight: Light middleweight Welterweight

Boxing career
- Reach: 71 in (180 cm)
- Stance: Orthodox

Boxing record
- Total fights: 59
- Wins: 44
- Win by KO: 30
- Losses: 14
- Draws: 1
Medal record
Men's amateur boxing
Representing United States
North American Championships
Gold medal – first place	1970 Vancouver	Welterweight

Armando Muñíz (born May 3, 1946) is a Mexican-born American former professional boxer and former NABF welterweight Champion. Muñiz was a member of the 1968 U.S. Olympic boxing team.

== 1968 Olympic record ==
Below are the results of Armando Muñiz, an American boxer, who competed at the 1968 Mexico City Olympics:

- Round of 64: bye
- Round of 32: defeated Marian Kasprzyk (Poland) on points, 4-1
- Round of 16: defeated Max Hebeisen (Switzerland) on points, 4-1
- Quarterfinal: lost to Mario Guilotti (Argentina) on points, 1-4

== Professional career ==
In November 1971, Muniz knocked out title contender Clyde Gray (29-1) to capture the NABF Welterweight Championship. The bout was held at the Auditorium in Long Beach, California. Muniz made the last defense of his title in 1972 when he knocked out the favored Adolph Pruitt in eight sizzling rounds. Muniz, one of the most popular fighters in Southern California, fought twenty-three times at the historic Olympic Auditorium in downtown Los Angeles. In 1975, Muniz traveled to Acapulco, Mexico to challenge welterweight kingpin Jose "Mantequilla" Napoles. A 6-1 underdog at the opening bell, Muniz pounded on Napoles for 12 rounds. With the champion bleeding from both eyes, referee Ramon Berumen, raised the arm of Napoles after consulting with the WBC officials at ringside. Most boxing experts have referred to the Napoles "victory" as one of the worst robberies in boxing history. Muniz was cited as the "uncrowned" champion until Napoles defeated him in a rematch. Muniz made two more unsuccessful attempts at the title in 1977, losing to Carlos Palomino. He retired in 1978.

Muniz, a college graduate, taught at Rubidoux High School in Riverside, California, for over twenty years.

Muniz starred in Taxi (TV series) in season 2, episode 15 "The Reluctant Fighter". He portrayed a retired, former champion boxer named Benny Foster trying to make a comeback. He also acted in 1989's film "Fists of Steel".

== Professional boxing record ==
44 Wins (30 knockouts, 14 decisions), 14 Losses (2 knockouts, 12 decisions), 1 Draw
Result	Record	Opponent	Type	Round	Date	Location	Notes
Loss	16-0	(United States) Sugar Ray Leonard	RTD	6	09/12/1978	(United States) Springfield Civic Center, Springfield, Massachusetts, U.S.	
Loss	26-1-3	(Mexico) Carlos Palomino	UD	15	27/05/1978	(United States) Olympic Auditorium, Los Angeles, California, U.S.	WBC Welterweight Title.
Win	36-1-1	(United States) Pete Ranzany	TKO	6	13/12/1977	(United States) Sacramento Memorial Auditorium, Sacramento, California, U.S.	
Loss	7-9-1	(Mexico) José Palacios	SD	10	06/08/1977	(United States) Olympic Auditorium, Los Angeles, California, U.S.	
Win	13-18	(Mexico) Ruben Vazquez Zamora	KO	8	17/06/1977	(United States) El Paso County Coliseum, El Paso, Texas, U.S.	
Win	19-5-1	(Mexico) Zovek Barajas	TKO	4	02/06/1977	(United States) Olympic Auditorium, Los Angeles, California, U.S.	
Win	2-3	(Mexico) Antonio Leyva	KO	1	20/03/1977	(United States) Caesars Palace, Paradise, Nevada, U.S.	Leyva knocked out at 0:30 of the first round.
Loss	20-1-3	(Mexico) Carlos Palomino	TKO	15	21/01/1977	(United States) Olympic Auditorium, Los Angeles, California, U.S.	WBC Welterweight Title. Referee stopped the bout at 2:24 of the 15th round.
Win	46-9-1	(United States) Jimmy Heair	UD	12	17/06/1976	(United States) Dudley Field, El Paso, Texas, U.S.	United States Welterweight Title.
Win	3-2-1	(Mexico) Abel Cordoba	SD	10	08/05/1976	(United States) Inglewood Forum, Inglewood, California, U.S.	
Win	43-28-9	(Argentina) Ruben Arocha	TKO	5	11/04/1976	Chihuahua, Chihuahua, Mexico	
Win	13-15	(Mexico) Ruben Vazquez Zamora	TKO	7	04/10/1975	(United States) Olympic Auditorium, Los Angeles, California, U.S.	
Loss	80-6	(Mexico) José Nápoles	UD	15	12/07/1975	Mexico City, Mexico	WBC Welterweight Title.
Loss	79-6	(Mexico) José Nápoles	TD	12	30/03/1975	Acapulco, Guerrero, Mexico	WBC/WBA Welterweight Titles.
Win	51-5	(United States) Hedgemon Lewis	UD	10	03/12/1974	(United States) Inglewood Forum, Inglewood, California, U.S.	
Win	24-9	(United States) Johnny Rico	SD	10	07/09/1974	(United States) Tucson Convention Center, Tucson, Arizona, U.S.	
Loss	30-6-4	(Puerto Rico) Ángel Espada	PTS	10	29/07/1974	San Juan, Puerto Rico	
Win	16-6-2	(United States) Billy Lloyd	KO	1	29/06/1974	(United States) Olympic Auditorium, Los Angeles, California, U.S.	Lloyd knocked out at 2:24 of the first round.
Win	13-10	(United States) Roy Barrientos	PTS	10	03/06/1974	Toronto, Ontario, Canada	
Loss	30-11	(Mexico) Marcos Geraldo	MD	10	18/04/1974	(United States) Olympic Auditorium, Los Angeles, California, U.S.	
Loss	71-16-2	(United States) Eddie Perkins	UD	12	22/03/1974	(United States) Tucson Convention Center, Tucson, Arizona, U.S.	NABF Welterweight Title.
Win	14-4-1	(United States) Walter Charles	KO	3	08/03/1974	(United States) San Diego, California, U.S.	Charles knocked out at 1:29 of the third round.
Win	45-4-1	(United States) Dave Oropeza	KO	3	26/01/1974	(United States) Tucson Convention Center, Tucson, Arizona, U.S.	
Win	12-9-3	(United States) Jose Miranda	UD	10	08/11/1973	(United States) Olympic Auditorium, Los Angeles, California, U.S.	
Loss	14-2	(Mexico) Zovek Barajas	MD	10	11/10/1973	(United States) Olympic Auditorium, Los Angeles, California, U.S.	
Win	3-1-1	(Mexico) Antonio Roldán	TKO	2	06/09/1973	(United States) Olympic Auditorium, Los Angeles, California, U.S.	Referee stopped the bout at 2:24 of the second round.
Win	48-10-1	(United States) Ernie Lopez	TKO	7	26/07/1973	(United States) Olympic Auditorium, Los Angeles, California, U.S.	
Win	16-6-1	(United States) Thurman Durden	KO	2	07/06/1973	(United States) Olympic Auditorium, Los Angeles, California, U.S.	Durden knocked out at 0:30 of the second round.
Win	59-27-6	(United States) Manuel Gonzalez	MD	10	04/05/1973	(United States) Tucson Convention Center, Tucson, Arizona, U.S.	
Win	27-4-1	(United States) Frank Kolovrat	TKO	4	09/03/1973	(United States) Tucson Convention Center, Tucson, Arizona, U.S.	
Loss	67-16-2	(United States) Eddie Perkins	SD	12	30/01/1973	(United States) Denver Auditorium Arena, Denver, Colorado, U.S.	Lost NABF welterweight title.
Win	44-11-2	(United States) Adolph Pruitt	TKO	8	02/12/1972	(United States) Anaheim Convention Center, Anaheim, California, U.S.	Retained NABF welterweight title. Referee stopped the bout at 2:01 of the eighth round.
Loss	9-4-3	(United States) Jose Martin Flores	UD	10	15/11/1972	(United States) Silver Slipper, Paradise, Nevada, U.S.	
Win	8-13-5	(United States) Eltefat Talebi	MD	10	24/10/1972	(United States) Valley Music Theater, Woodland Hills, California, U.S.	
Win	47-28	(United States) Percy Pugh	KO	2	11/09/1972	(United States) Anaheim Convention Center, Anaheim, California, U.S.	Retained NABF welterweight title.
Win	10-7	(Mexico) Ruben Vazquez Zamora	UD	12	31/07/1972	(United States) Anaheim Convention Center, Anaheim, California, U.S.	Retained NABF welterweight title.
Win	9-4	(United States) Prince Jimmy Hamm	TKO	2	10/07/1972	(United States) Inglewood Forum, Inglewood, California, U.S.	Referee stopped the bout at 2:11 of the second round.
Win	13-13-1	(United States) Cassius Greene	TKO	6	19/06/1972	(United States) Inglewood Forum, Inglewood, California, U.S.	Referee stopped the bout at 2:41 of the sixth round.
Loss	53-23-1	(Mexico) Raul Soriano	MD	10	22/05/1972	(United States) Inglewood Forum, Inglewood, California, U.S.	
Win	3-4	(Mexico) Mario Olmedo	TKO	1	25/03/1972	(United States) Denver, Colorado, U.S.	Referee stopped the bout at 2:12 of the first round.
Win	43-45-4	(Ghana) Peter Cobblah	UD	10	18/03/1972	(United States) Long Beach Convention and Entertainment Center, Long Beach, California, U.S.	
Loss	71-12	(United States Virgin Islands) Emile Griffith	UD	10	31/01/1972	(United States) Anaheim Convention Center, Anaheim, California, U.S.	
Win	29-1-1	(Canada) Clyde Gray	KO	9	19/11/1971	(United States) Long Beach Convention and Entertainment Center, Long Beach, California, U.S.	Won inaugural NABF welterweight title. Gray knocked out at 1:43 of the ninth round.
Win	30-2	(United States) Gil King	TKO	5	14/08/1971	(United States) Anaheim Convention Center, Anaheim, California, U.S.	Referee stopped the bout at 3:00 of the fifth round.
Win	84-18-3	(Mexico) Chucho Garcia	MD	10	17/07/1971	(United States) Santa Monica Civic Auditorium, Santa Monica, California, U.S.	
Win	5-6	(Mexico) Mario Marquez	KO	3	19/06/1971	(United States) Santa Monica Civic Auditorium, Santa Monica, California, U.S.	Marquez knocked out at 1:41 of the third round.
Draw	36-4	(United States) Oscar Albarado	PTS	10	06/05/1971	(United States) Olympic Auditorium, Los Angeles, California, U.S.	
Win	13-12-2	(United States) Cipriano Hernandez	UD	10	18/03/1971	(United States) Olympic Auditorium, Los Angeles, California, U.S.	
Win	26-9-2	(United States) Mike Seyler	TKO	3	12/02/1971	(United States) Los Angeles Memorial Sports Arena, Los Angeles, California, U.S.	Referee stopped the bout at 2:35 of the third round.
Win	11-1	(United States) James Caffey	TKO	7	07/01/1971	(United States) Olympic Auditorium, Los Angeles, California, U.S.	Referee stopped the bout at 2:01 of the seventh round.
Win	--	Jose Carreon	KO	1	10/12/1970	(United States) Olympic Auditorium, Los Angeles, California, U.S.	Carreon knocked out at 2:36 of the first round.
Win	6-4	(United States) Crispen Benitez	KO	2	12/11/1970	(United States) Olympic Auditorium, Los Angeles, California, U.S.	Benitez knocked out at 1:22 of the second round.
Win	3-0	(United States) Victor Manuel Basilio	TKO	4	08/10/1970	(United States) Olympic Auditorium, Los Angeles, California, U.S.	Referee stopped the bout at 1:25 of the fourth round.
Win	10-2-1	(United States) Walter Charles	PTS	6	26/09/1970	(United States) Valley Music Theater, Woodland Hills, California, U.S.	
Win	7-1	(United States) Bobby Watts	PTS	6	03/09/1970	(United States) Olympic Auditorium, Los Angeles, California, U.S.	
Win	2-3	(Mexico) José Valencia	KO	2	20/08/1970	(United States) Olympic Auditorium, Los Angeles, California, U.S.	Valencia knocked out at 2:38 of the second round.
Win	1-7-1	(Japan) Takuji Iwase	KO	2	06/08/1970	(United States) Olympic Auditorium, Los Angeles, California, U.S.	Iwase knocked out at 2:40 of the second round.
Win	1-1	(United States) Eltefat Talebi	TKO	1	23/07/1970	(United States) Olympic Auditorium, Los Angeles, California, U.S.	Referee stopped the bout at 1:46 of the first round.
Win	6-6-1	(United States) Joe Adams	TKO	3	16/07/1970	(United States) Olympic Auditorium, Los Angeles, California, U.S.	
