= Hedgemon Lewis =

American boxer and trainer (1946–2020)

Personal information
- Born: February 25, 1946 Greensboro, Alabama, U.S.
- Died: March 31, 2020 (aged 74) Detroit, Michigan, U.S.
- Weight: Welterweight; Light middleweight

Boxing career
- Stance: Orthodox

Boxing record
- Total fights: 63
- Wins: 53
- Losses: 7
- Draws: 2
- No contests: 1

Hedgemon Lewis (February 25, 1946 – March 31, 2020) was an American professional boxer and trainer. He held the NYSAC welterweight world title in 1972 and challenged for welterweight world championships on three occasions; the unified WBA, and WBC titles twice in 1971 and 1974; and the WBC title in 1976. As an amateur, he won the National Golden Gloves lightweight title in 1964 and the welterweight title in 1966.

== Professional career ==
Lewis was initially taken under the wing of Detroit-based coach Luther Burgess, who presided over his formative boxing years and was later trained by Eddie Futch. Due to Lewis’s exciting style, he soon attracted the attention of Hollywood. His management company consisted of actors and entertainment stars such as Ryan O'Neal, Bill Cosby, and Robert Goulet.

Racing through the early part of his career, Lewis was victorious in his first 22 fights. He fought out of Detroit initially, before basing himself in Los Angeles. Establishing himself as one of boxing’s top prospects, Lewis was poised to take on his biggest fight to date, against Ernie ‘Indian Red’ Lopez. In the first 4 rounds, Lewis outclassed his opponent, before Lopez came from behind to win.

Lewis bounced back to win his next five fights, including defeating highly rated contender Oscar "Shotgun" Albarado over ten rounds. This set the stage for a rematch against former foe Ernie Lopez. In a closely fought and exciting contest, Lewis picked up the decision, flooring his opponent in round 4.

=== Fighting for the world title ===
Embarking on a succession of impressive wins, Lewis improved his record to 40-3. In December 1971, Lewis took on Cuban fighter Jose Napoles for the WBC and WBA World Welterweight titles. The bout was tightly contested, with Lewis pushing the world champion for the full 15 rounds. The decision went to Napoles, but all 3 judges scorecards registered a very close fight. Still at a relatively young age of 25, Lewis returned to winning ways, racking up 11 straight wins on the bounce. This included a doubleheader against former world champion Billy Backus.

Lewis traveled to Syracuse, New York, the home town of Backus, for the first bout in June 1972. In what turned out to be one of the fights of the year, Lewis dropped his rival in round 4 on his way to a decision victory. In the rematch, later on, that year, Lewis would once again claim victory. In defeating Backus, Lewis picked up the New York version of the World Welterweight title. He also gained the admiration of the New York boxing scene. Continuing on with varying degrees of success, Lewis would fight twice more for the world title, including a rematch against Jose Napoles, without success. Hedgemon Lewis retired in 1976 at the age of 30. His final career record read 53-7-2. Lewis was inducted into the California Boxing Hall of Fame in 2006.

== Post professional boxing career ==
Not yet finished with the sport, Lewis became a noted coach and cornerman in the world of boxing. He worked the corners with legendary figures such as Eddie Futch, Thell Torrence and Freddy Roach. He would play a key role as part of Futch’s camp in the epic ‘Thriller in Manila’ fight. Lewis trained fighters until his death. Outside of boxing, he also achieved success in the Los Angeles real estate market. Lewis also appeared as a craps gambler in the Ryan O'Neal 1985 movie, Fever Pitch.

He died on March 31, 2020, at the age of 74, of COVID-19 on top of other health issues.

== Professional boxing record ==
62 fights	53 wins	7 losses
By knockout	26	4
By decision	27	3
Draws	2	

No.	Result	Record	Opponent	Type	Round, time	Date	Location	Notes
63	Loss	53–7–2 (1)	John H. Stracey	TKO	10 (15), 1:25	Mar 20, 1976	Empire Pool, Wembley, London, England, UK	For WBC and The Ring welterweight titles
62	Draw	53–6–2 (1)	Harold Weston	PTS	10	Dec 12, 1975	Madison Square Garden, New York City, New York, US	
61	Draw	53–6–1 (1)	Carlos Palomino	MD	10	Nov 22, 1975	Olympic Auditorium, Los Angeles, California, US	
60	Win	53–6 (1)	Rafael Rodriguez	MD	10	May 7, 1975	Auditorium, Minneapolis, Minnesota, US	
59	Win	52–6 (1)	Rafael Rodriguez	UD	10	Mar 19, 1975	Auditorium, Minneapolis, Minnesota, US	
58	Loss	51–6 (1)	Armando Muñíz	UD	10	Dec 3, 1974	Forum, Inglewood, California, US	
57	Loss	51–5 (1)	José Nápoles	TKO	9 (15), 2:40	Aug 3, 1974	Palacio de los Deportes, Mexico City, Mexico	For WBA, WBC, and The Ring welterweight titles
56	Win	51–4 (1)	Felipe Vaca	KO	4 (10)	Apr 28, 1974	Gimnasio de Mexicali, Mexicali, Mexico	
55	Win	50–4 (1)	Jose Miranda	UD	10	Mar 1, 1974	Coliseum, San Diego, California, US	
54	Win	49–4 (1)	Johnny Gant	UD	10	Dec 10, 1973	Felt Forum, New York City, New York, US	
53	Win	48–4 (1)	Rudy Barro	KO	3 (10), 2:52	Nov 6, 1973	Memorial Auditorium, Sacramento, California, US	
52	Win	47–4 (1)	Chucho Garcia	UD	10	Oct 13, 1973	Forum, Inglewood, California, US	
51	Win	46–4 (1)	Ruben Zamora	TKO	6 (10), 2:12	Mar 31, 1973	Sports Arena, San Diego, California, US	
50	Win	45–4 (1)	Billy Backus	UD	15	Dec 8, 1972	War Memorial Auditorium, Syracuse, New York, US	Retained NYSAC welterweight title
49	Win	44–4 (1)	Jose Baltazar	UD	10	Oct 13, 1972	Coliseum, San Diego, California, US	
48	Win	43–4 (1)	Mario Marquez	KO	2 (10)	Jul 21, 1972	San Diego, California, US	
47	Win	42–4 (1)	Billy Backus	UD	15	Jun 16, 1972	War Memorial Auditorium, Syracuse, New York, US	Won vacant NYSAC welterweight title
46	Win	41–4 (1)	Ruben Zamora	UD	10	May 8, 1972	Forum, Inglewood, California, US	
45	Loss	40–4 (1)	José Nápoles	UD	15	Dec 14, 1971	Forum, Inglewood, California, US	For WBA, WBC, and The Ring welterweight titles
44	Win	40–3 (1)	Jose Gabino	KO	6 (10), 1:12	Sep 24, 1971	Convention Center, Anaheim, California, US	
43	Win	39–3 (1)	Cassius Greene	TKO	6 (10), 2:55	Jul 31, 1971	Civic Auditorium, Santa Monica, California, US	
42	Win	38–3 (1)	Arturo Lomeli	KO	6 (10)	Jun 28, 1971	Auditorio Municipal, Tijuana, Mexico	
41	Win	37–3 (1)	Percy Pugh	TKO	8 (10), 2:10	May 17, 1971	Municipal Auditorium, New Orleans, Louisiana, US	
40	ND	36–3 (1)	Leroy Romero	ND	3 (10)	May 7, 1971	Minidome, Pocatello, Idaho, US	
39	Loss	36–3	Adolph Pruitt	UD	10	Jan 12, 1971	Honolulu International Center, Honolulu, Hawaii, US	
38	Win	36–2	Manuel Avitia	TKO	8 (10), 3:00	Oct 31, 1970	Valley Music Theatre, Woodland Hills, California, US	
37	Win	35–2	Raul Soriano	UD	10	Oct 8, 1970	Olympic Auditorium, Los Angeles, California, US	
36	Win	34–2	Chucho Almazan	KO	8 (10), 1:23	Aug 13, 1970	Olympic Auditorium, Los Angeles, California, US	
35	Win	33–2	Raúl Rodríguez	TD	2 (10)	Jul 7, 1970	Tijuana, Mexico	
34	Win	32–2	Severo Balboa	KO	3 (10), 1:35	Jun 19, 1970	Valley Music Theatre, Woodland Hills, California, US	
33	Win	31–2	Ricky Ortiz	TKO	3 (10), 2:06	May 26, 1970	Valley Music Theatre, Woodland Hills, California, US	
32	Win	30–2	Gustavo Garcia	KO	5 (10)	May 13, 1970	Tijuana, Mexico	
31	Win	29–2	Don Cobbs	UD	10	Dec 18, 1969	Olympia Stadium, Detroit, Michigan, US	
30	Loss	28–2	Ernie Lopez	TKO	10 (10), 2:33	Oct 4, 1969	Sports Arena, Los Angeles, California, US	
29	Win	28–1	Ernie Lopez	UD	10	Jul 10, 1969	Olympic Auditorium, Los Angeles, California, US	
28	Win	27–1	Oscar Albarado	UD	10	Apr 10, 1969	Olympic Auditorium, Los Angeles, California, US	
27	Win	26–1	Miguel Hernandez	KO	1 (10)	Mar 20, 1969	Olympic Auditorium, Los Angeles, California, US	
26	Win	25–1	Celso Olivas	KO	1 (10), 1:18	Oct 31, 1968	Olympic Auditorium, Los Angeles, California, US	
25	Win	24–1	Miguel Aguilar	UD	10	Sep 19, 1968	Olympic Auditorium, Los Angeles, California, US	
24	Win	23–1	Shelly Lyons	PTS	10	Sep 3, 1968	Circle Arts Theater, San Diego, California, US	
23	Loss	22–1	Ernie Lopez	TKO	9 (10), 1:48	Jul 18, 1968	Olympic Auditorium, Los Angeles, California, US	
22	Win	22–0	Doug McLeod	TKO	2 (10), 1:00	Jun 13, 1968	Olympic Auditorium, Los Angeles, California, US	
21	Win	21–0	Bob Murray	UD	10	May 16, 1968	Olympic Auditorium, Los Angeles, California, US	
20	Win	20–0	Jose Valenzuela	RTD	5 (10), 3:00	Apr 25, 1968	Olympic Auditorium, Los Angeles, California, US	
19	Win	19–0	Ruben Rivera	KO	2 (10), 2:08	Apr 4, 1968	Olympic Auditorium, Los Angeles, California, US	
18	Win	18–0	Miguel Aguilar	UD	10	Oct 19, 1967	Olympic Auditorium, Los Angeles, California, US	
17	Win	17–0	Carl Jordan	PTS	9	Aug 24, 1967	Cobo Arena, Detroit, Michigan, US	
16	Win	16–0	Colin Fraser	PTS	8	Jun 26, 1967	Toronto, Ontario, Canada	
15	Win	15–0	Garry Broughton	UD	8	Jun 15, 1967	Cobo Arena, Detroit, Michigan, US	
14	Win	14–0	Primus Williams	UD	8	May 12, 1967	Cobo Arena, Detroit, Michigan, US	
13	Win	13–0	Mel Fields	KO	3 (5)	Apr 13, 1967	Olympic Auditorium, Los Angeles, California, US	
12	Win	12–0	Charley Lewis	PTS	6	Mar 23, 1967	Convention Center, Louisville, Kentucky, US	
11	Win	11–0	Sam Ivory	TKO	5 (10)	Mar 18, 1967	Armory, Newark, New Jersey, US	
10	Win	10–0	Primus Williams	UD	6	Jan 28, 1967	Armory, Newark, New Jersey, US	
9	Win	9–0	Phil Garcia	KO	3 (6)	Dec 1, 1966	Olympic Auditorium, Los Angeles, California, US	
8	Win	8–0	Dawson Smith	UD	4	Nov 21, 1966	Cobo Arena, Detroit, Michigan, US	
7	Win	7–0	Charley Lewis	UD	6	Nov 1, 1966	Civic Auditorium, Grand Rapids, Michigan, US	
6	Win	6–0	Clavis Dejarnette	TKO	2 (4), 2:14	Oct 26, 1966	Armory, Akron, Ohio, US	
5	Win	5–0	Arnold Bushman	TKO	3 (6)	Oct 6, 1966	Cobo Arena, Detroit, Michigan, US	
4	Win	4–0	Mike Belski	TKO	1 (6), 1:29	Aug 29, 1966	Cobo Arena, Detroit, Michigan, US	
3	Win	3–0	Larry Youngblood	TKO	2 (4)	Aug 5, 1966	Cobo Arena, Detroit, Michigan, US	
2	Win	2–0	Larry Youngblood	UD	4	Jul 11, 1966	Cobo Hall, Detroit, Michigan, US	
1	Win	1–0	Arnold Bushman	RTD	2 (4)	May 13, 1966	Music Hall Arena, Cincinnati, Ohio, US	

Titles in pretence
Vacant	World Welterweight Champion; NYSAC Recognition; June 16, 1972 – August 3, 1974	Lost bid for undiputed title
