= Oscar Albarado =

American boxer (1948–2021)

Personal information
- Nickname: Shotgun
- Nationality: American
- Born: Oscar Albarado; September 15, 1948 Pecos, Texas, U.S.
- Died: February 17, 2021 (aged 72) Uvalde, Texas, U.S.
- Height: 5 ft 6 1/2 in (169 cm)
- Weight: Light middleweight

Boxing career
- Reach: 68 in (173 cm)
- Stance: Orthodox

Boxing record
- Total fights: 71
- Wins: 57
- Win by KO: 43
- Losses: 13
- Draws: 1

Oscar Albarado (September 15, 1948 – February 17, 2021) was an American former professional boxer who held the undisputed light middleweight world championship from June 1974 to January 1975.

== Professional career ==
Known as "Shotgun", Albarado turned pro in 1966 and captured the undisputed light middleweight championship when he upset Koichi Wajima by KO in 1974. He defended the crown once before losing it in a rematch to Wajima in 1975 by decision. He retired after the loss.

== Comeback ==
Albarado launched an unsuccessful comeback five years later, retiring in 1982 after several losses.

== Death ==
Albarado died on February 17, 2021, in Uvalde Texas at Amistad Nursing home at the age of 72.

== Professional boxing record ==
71 fights	57 wins	13 losses
By knockout	43	7
By decision	13	6
By disqualification	1	0
Draws	1	

No.	Result	Record	Opponent	Type	Round, time	Date	Location	Notes
71	Loss	57–13–1	Ayub Kalule	TKO	2 (10)	30 Apr 1982	Brøndbyhallen, Copenhagen, Denmark	
70	Loss	57–12–1	John Jackie Collins	TKO	9 (10), 0:42	26 Feb 1982	Bismarck Hotel, Chicago, Illinois, U.S.	
69	Loss	57–11–1	Louis Acaries	TKO	9 (10)	21 Jan 1982	Paris, France	
68	Win	57–10–1	Larry Martin	KO	4 (10)	19 Nov 1981	St. Joseph Civic Arena, Saint Joseph, Missouri, U.S.	
67	Loss	56–10–1	Bernard Mays	KO	9 (10)	14 Oct 1981	Cobo Hall, Detroit, Michigan, U.S.	
66	Win	56–9–1	Ray Phillips	KO	8 (10)	21 Jul 1981	Billy Bob's Texas, Fort Worth, Texas, U.S.	
65	Loss	55–9–1	Bobby Czyz	TKO	3 (10), 2:30	21 May 1981	Ice World, Totowa, New Jersey, U.S.	
64	Win	55–8–1	Norris McKinney	KO	6 (10)	7 May 1981	Laredo, Texas, U.S.	
63	Win	54–8–1	Miguel Balderas	KO	4 (10)	10 Mar 1981	Civic Center Arena, Laredo, Texas, U.S.	
62	Win	53–8–1	Robert Perry	PTS	10	24 Feb 1981	Civic Center, Beaumont, Texas, U.S.	
61	Loss	52–8–1	Paul Stephens	KO	4 (15), 1:06	15 Jan 1981	Will Rogers Coliseum, Fort Worth, Texas, U.S.	
60	Win	52–7–1	German Marquez	KO	2 (10), 0:44	14 Oct 1980	Civic Center Arena, Laredo, Texas, U.S.	
59	Win	51–7–1	Jesse Lara	KO	6 (15)	1 Sep 1980	Laredo, Texas, U.S.	
58	Loss	50–7–1	Koichi Wajima	UD	15	21 Jan 1975	Nihon University Auditorium, Tokyo, Japan	Lost WBA, WBC, and The Ring junior middleweight titles
57	Win	50–6–1	Ryu Sorimachi	TKO	7 (15), 2:17	8 Oct 1974	Nihon University Auditorium, Tokyo, Japan	Retained WBA, WBC, and The Ring junior middleweight titles
56	Win	49–6–1	Koichi Wajima	KO	15 (15), 1:57	4 Jun 1974	Nihon University Auditorium, Tokyo, Japan	Won WBA, WBC, and inaugural The Ring junior middleweight title
55	Win	48–6–1	Eddie Mazon	PTS	10	26 Apr 1974	Coliseum, San Diego, California, U.S.	
54	Win	47–6–1	Eddie Mazon	UD	10	1 Nov 1973	Olympic Auditorium, Los Angeles, California, U.S.	
53	Win	46–6–1	Dino Del Cid	KO	2 (10), 0:52	28 Jun 1973	Olympic Auditorium, Los Angeles, California, U.S.	
52	Loss	45–6–1	Dino Del Cid	TKO	1 (10), 1:33	17 May 1973	Olympic Auditorium, Los Angeles, California, U.S.	
51	Win	45–5–1	Alex Olguin	KO	4 (10), 1:44	19 Mar 1973	Olympic Auditorium, Los Angeles, California, U.S.	
50	Win	44–5–1	Rodolfo Martinez	KO	3 (10), 2:40	15 Feb 1973	Olympic Auditorium, Los Angeles, California, U.S.	
49	Win	43–5–1	Thurman Durden	SD	10	4 Jan 1973	Olympic Auditorium, Los Angeles, California, U.S.	
48	Win	42–5–1	Rey Reyes	KO	1 (10), 2:58	16 Nov 1972	Olympic Auditorium, Los Angeles, California, U.S.	
47	Win	41–5–1	Ruben Arocha	TKO	9 (10), 0:43	3 Aug 1972	Olympic Auditorium, Los Angeles, California, U.S.	
46	Win	40–5–1	Demetrio Salazar	KO	4 (10), 2:06	11 Jul 1972	Municipal Auditorium, San Antonio, Texas, U.S.	
45	Win	39–5–1	James Shelton	TKO	3 (10), 1:58	6 Jun 1972	Municipal Auditorium, San Antonio, Texas, U.S.	
44	Loss	38–5–1	Ernie Lopez	UD	10	28 Oct 1971	Olympic Auditorium, Los Angeles, California, U.S.	
43	Win	38–4–1	Matt Roa	KO	4 (10), 2:48	7 Oct 1971	Olympic Auditorium, Los Angeles, California, U.S.	
42	Win	37–4–1	Bobby Williams	UD	10	26 Aug 1971	Olympic Auditorium, Los Angeles, California, U.S.	
41	Win	36–4–1	Freddie Jones	TKO	1 (10), 2:54	22 Jul 1971	Olympic Auditorium, Los Angeles, California, U.S.	
40	Draw	35–4–1	Armando Muñíz	SD	10	6 May 1971	Olympic Auditorium, Los Angeles, California, U.S.	
39	Win	35–4	Frankie Lewis	MD	10	16 Apr 1971	Municipal Auditorium, San Antonio, Texas, U.S.	
38	Loss	34–4	Manuel Fierro	UD	10	30 Mar 1971	Honolulu International Center, Honolulu, Hawaii, U.S.	
37	Win	34–3	Raul Soriano	SD	10	24 Nov 1970	Municipal Auditorium, San Antonio, Texas, U.S.	
36	Win	33–3	Larry Brazier	TKO	3 (10)	6 Oct 1970	Municipal Auditorium, San Antonio, Texas, U.S.	
35	Win	32–3	Pedro Adigue	UD	10	2 Jun 1970	Honolulu International Center, Honolulu, Hawaii, U.S.	
34	Win	31–3	Roberto Oscar Amaya	TKO	9 (10), 1:41	5 May 1970	Honolulu International Center, Honolulu, Hawaii, U.S.	
33	Win	30–3	Charlie Green	TKO	3 (10), 2:07	14 Apr 1970	Memorial Coliseum, Corpus Christi, Texas, U.S.	
32	Loss	29–3	Percy Pugh	UD	10	30 Mar 1970	Municipal Auditorium, New Orleans, Louisiana, U.S.	
31	Loss	29–2	Adolph Pruitt	UD	10	27 Jan 1970	Honolulu International Center, Honolulu, Hawaii, U.S.	
30	Win	29–1	Bobby Williams	TKO	7 (10), 2:40	9 Dec 1969	Municipal Auditorium, San Antonio, Texas, U.S.	
29	Win	28–1	LC Morgan	TKO	5 (10), 0:45	28 Oct 1969	Municipal Auditorium, San Antonio, Texas, U.S.	
28	Win	27–1	LC Morgan	DQ	5 (10)	7 Oct 1969	Municipal Auditorium, San Antonio, Texas, U.S.	
27	Win	26–1	Thurman Durden	MD	10	14 Aug 1969	Olympic Auditorium, Los Angeles, California, U.S.	
26	Win	25–1	Johnny Brooks	TKO	7 (10), 2:06	3 Jun 1969	Convention Center Arena, San Antonio, Texas, U.S.	
25	Loss	24–1	Hedgemon Lewis	UD	10	10 Apr 1969	Olympic Auditorium, Los Angeles, California, U.S.	
24	Win	24–0	Miguel Aguilar	TKO	3 (10), 0:43	6 Mar 1969	Olympic Auditorium, Los Angeles, California, U.S.	
23	Win	23–0	Jose Valenzuela	TKO	6 (10)	6 Feb 1969	Olympic Auditorium, Los Angeles, California, U.S.	
22	Win	22–0	Miguel Hernandez	UD	10	23 Jan 1969	Olympic Auditorium, Los Angeles, California, U.S.	
21	Win	21–0	Johnny Doyan	KO	2 (8), 1:29	9 Jan 1969	Olympic Auditorium, Los Angeles, California, U.S.	
20	Win	20–0	Jerry Graci	KO	9 (10)	29 Oct 1968	Convention Center Arena, San Antonio, Texas, U.S.	
19	Win	19–0	Lonnie Harris	KO	1 (10), 2:20	30 Sep 1968	Municipal Auditorium, San Antonio, Texas, U.S.	
18	Win	18–0	Cassius Greene	KO	1 (10), 2:42	10 Sep 1968	Municipal Auditorium, San Antonio, Texas, U.S.	
17	Win	17–0	Gilbert Gutierrez	TKO	3 (10), 2:04	17 Jul 1968	Memorial Coliseum, Corpus Christi, Texas, U.S.	
16	Win	16–0	Gilbert de los Santos	TKO	5 (10)	3 May 1968	Freeman Coliseum, San Antonio, Texas, U.S.	
15	Win	15–0	Gilbert Gutierrez	KO	1 (10)	2 Apr 1968	Municipal Auditorium, San Antonio, Texas, U.S.	
14	Win	14–0	Gilbert Gutierrez	UD	8	19 Mar 1968	Municipal Auditorium, San Antonio, Texas, U.S.	
13	Win	13–0	Allen Moten	KO	1 (6)	1 Feb 1968	Piedras Negras, Coahuila, Mexico	
12	Win	12–0	Ruben Rivera	KO	2 (6)	1 Jan 1968	Piedras Negras, Coahuila, Mexico	
11	Win	11–0	Hector Ramirez	KO	2 (8), 2:10	12 Dec 1967	Freeman Coliseum, San Antonio, Texas, U.S.	
10	Win	10–0	Billy Strother	UD	6	14 Nov 1967	Municipal Auditorium, San Antonio, Texas, U.S.	
9	Win	9–0	Chuy Andrade	KO	1 (6)	28 Oct 1967	Rosita South, Texas, U.S.	
8	Win	8–0	Lechero Gonzalez	KO	1 (6)	30 Sep 1967	Rosita South, Texas, U.S.	
7	Win	7–0	Piri Albarado	KO	6 (6)	2 Sep 1967	Rosita South, Texas, U.S.	
6	Win	6–0	Nat Jackson	SD	6	10 Jul 1967	Municipal Auditorium, New Orleans, Louisiana, U.S.	
5	Win	5–0	Gary Pannell	TKO	2 (4)	16 Jun 1967	Teamsters Hall, Baton Rouge, Louisiana, U.S.	
4	Win	4–0	Freddie Burris	TKO	2 (6)	30 May 1967	Memorial Coliseum, Corpus Christi, Texas, U.S.	
3	Win	3–0	Jesus Cuate Lara	KO	3	1 Apr 1967	Rosita South, Texas, U.S.	
2	Win	2–0	Ramiro Hernandez	KO	3	11 Mar 1967	Rosita South, Texas, U.S.	
1	Win	1–0	Genaro Morones	TKO	4 (4), 2:24	12 Apr 1966	Municipal Auditorium, San Antonio, Texas, U.S.	

== Titles in boxing ==
=== Major world titles ===
- WBA light middleweight champion (154 lbs)
- WBC light middleweight champion (154 lbs)

=== The Ring magazine titles ===
- The Ring light middleweight champion (Note: Inaugural champion.) (154 lbs)

=== Undisputed titles ===
- Undisputed light middleweight champion

== See also ==
- List of world light-middleweight boxing champions

== Notes and references ==
=== References ===
Sporting positions
World boxing titles
Preceded by Koichi Wajima	WBA light middleweight champion June 4, 1974 – January 21, 1975	Succeeded by Koichi Wajima
Preceded by Koichi Wajima	WBC light middleweight champion June 4, 1974 – January 21, 1975	Succeeded by Koichi Wajima
Preceded by Koichi Wajima	Undisputed light middleweight champion June 4, 1974 – January 21, 1975	Succeeded by Koichi Wajima
Inaugural Champion	The Ring light middleweight champion June 4, 1974 – January 21, 1975	Succeeded by Koichi Wajima
