= John H. Stracey =

British boxer

Personal information
- Nationality: British
- Born: 22 September 1950 (age 75) Barking, England
- Height: 5 ft 7 1/2 in (171 cm)
- Weight: Welterweight

Boxing career
- Reach: 70 in (178 cm)
- Stance: Orthodox

Boxing record
- Total fights: 51
- Wins: 45
- Win by KO: 37
- Losses: 5
- Draws: 1

John Henry Stracey MBE (born 22 September 1950) is a British former professional boxer who competed from 1969 to 1978. He is a former welterweight world champion, having held the WBC and lineal welterweight titles between 1975 and 1976. At regional level, he held the British and European welterweight titles between 1973 and 1975, and is ranked by BoxRec as the eighth best British welterweight of all time.

== Amateur career ==
Stracey competed for Great Britain as a lightweight at the 1968 Summer Olympics. He was defeated in the Round of 16 by eventual gold medallist Ronnie Harris. Stracey won the 1969 ABA light-welterweight championship.

== Professional career ==
=== Early career ===
Stracey began his professional career on 17 September 1969, knocking out Santos Martins in two rounds. Stracey won his first twelve fights, eleven by knockout, but against obscure opposition. Fight number thirteen was against Teddy Cooper, on 19 January 1971. Cooper was not a big name in boxing either, but this fight ended in controversy when Stracey won by a fifth round disqualification. On 5 October 1971 Stracey drew (tied) in ten rounds against Frankie Lewis.

Stracey produced five more wins before being matched with Marshall Butler, on 25 May 1972, at the Royal Albert Hall, suffering his first defeat after being outpointed by Butler over eight rounds. He then put a string of four more wins together, before facing Bobby Arthur for the British welterweight title, on 31 October, at the Royal Albert Hall. He lost the fight with another controversial ending: This time, Stracey found himself disqualified in round seven. Stracey then won five more bouts in a row. In February 1973, Stracey traveled to the United States, where he fought Danny McAloon on the undercard of the first Ali vs. Bugner fight, at the Las Vegas Convention Center, on 14 February. Stracey won the bout via unanimous decision. He then met Bobby Arthur in a rematch on 5 June, this time winning the British title with a fourth-round knockout.

=== Stracey vs. Menetrey ===
On 27 May 1974, Stracey got his chance at the European welterweight title, fighting Roger Menetrey at the Stade de Roland Garros, in Paris, France. Stracey won via eighth-round knockout. On 29 April 1975, he defended his European title against Max Hebeisen, at the Royal Albert Hall, winning via RTD in the sixth round.

=== Stracey vs. Nápoles ===
During the 1970s, it was a common practice to give world title shots to boxers who held continental titles. For example, the OPBF (Oriental Pacific Boxing Federation) champion would be given priority over other challengers for world title fights. Stracey was no exception, and, after winning five more fights in a row (including a win over Ernie Lopez), he received his first world title shot: challenging WBC welterweight champion José Nápoles, in Nápoles' home-town of Mexico City, Mexico, on 6 December 1975. Stracey was sent down in round one, but he recuperated to close Nápoles' eye and have referee Octavio Meyran stop the fight in the sixth round, Stracey winning the world championship by a technical knockout. The new champion declared, "He [Nápoles] could have knocked me down in every round but I'd have won it anyway". It was Nápoles' last fight.

=== 1976 ===
On 20 March 1976 he retained the title against perennial world title challenger Hedgemon Lewis by a knockout in round ten, but on 22 June, at Wembley, he lost the world title, being knocked out in twelve rounds by California-based Mexican Carlos Palomino. In his next fight, he lost to future world title challenger Dave Boy Green, with a badly damaged eye in round ten. Stracey retired as a winner when he knocked out George Warusfel in nine rounds in Islington on 23 May 1978.

== Outside the ring ==
A business associate of Stracey bought the Three Horseshoes pub in Briston, Norfolk, in 1975 and renamed it the John H Stracey. In 2011 the pub reverted to its original name. He also had, at one point, a boxing school in London.

John also had a hotel in Bournemouth with a public bar called The Ringside.when he was married to Michele, they also had a daughter called Laura. He is now a supporter and patron of the Devon-based Kings Boxing Academy. https://www.kingsboxingacademy.co.uk/patrons/

== Professional boxing record ==
51 fights	45 wins	5 losses
By knockout	37	3
By decision	8	2
Draws	1	

No.	Result	Record	Opponent	Type	Round, time	Date	Location	Notes
51	Win	45–5–1	Georges Warusfel	TKO	9 (10)	23 May 1978	Michael Sobell Sports Centre, London, England	
50	Loss	44–5–1	Dave Boy Green	TKO	10 (10)	29 Mar, 1977	Empire Pool, London, England	
49	Loss	44–4–1	Carlos Palomino	TKO	12 (15), 1:35	22 Jun, 1976	Empire Pool, London, England	Lost WBC and The Ring welterweight titles
48	Win	44–3–1	Hedgemon Lewis	TKO	10 (15), 1:25	20 Mar, 1976	Empire Pool, London, England	Retained WBC and The Ring welterweight titles
47	Win	43–3–1	José Nápoles	TKO	6 (15), 2:30	6 Dec, 1975	Plaza de Toros México, Mexico City, Mexico	Won WBC and The Ring welterweight titles
46	Win	42–3–1	Keith Averette	DQ	8 (10)	30 Sep, 1975	Empire Pool, London, England	
45	Win	41–3–1	Ruben Vazquez Zamora	TKO	8 (10)	30 Jun, 1975	Royal Albert Hall, London, England	
44	Win	40–3–1	Max Hebeisen	RTD	6 (15)	29 Apr, 1975	Royal Albert Hall, London, England	Retained European welterweight title
43	Win	39–3–1	Ernie Lopez	TKO	7 (10)	29 Oct, 1974	Royal Albert Hall, London, England	
42	Win	38–3–1	Tony Garcia	TKO	3 (10)	1 Oct, 1974	Empire Pool, London, England	
41	Win	37–3–1	Roger Menetrey	TKO	8 (15)	27 May 1974	Stade Roland Garros, Paris, France	Won European welterweight title
40	Win	36–3–1	Vernon Mason	KO	4 (10)	23 Apr, 1974	Royal Albert Hall, London, England	
39	Win	35–3–1	Jack Tillman	TKO	4 (10)	26 Mar, 1974	Royal Albert Hall, London, England	
38	Loss	34–3–1	Cuby Jackson	TKO	3 (10)	11 Dec, 1973	Royal Albert Hall, London, England	
37	Win	34–2–1	Marc Gervais	TKO	4 (10)	13 Nov, 1973	Empire Pool, London, England	
36	Win	33–2–1	Urban Baptiste	TKO	4 (10)	30 Oct, 1973	Royal Albert Hall, London, England	
35	Win	32–2–1	Jose Papo Melendez	TKO	3 (10)	10 Sep, 1973	Empire Pool, London, England	
34	Win	31–2–1	Bobby Arthur	KO	4 (15)	5 Jun, 1973	Royal Albert Hall, London, England	Won British welterweight title
33	Win	30–2–1	Pat Murphy	TKO	5 (10)	9 May 1973	York Hall, London, England	
32	Win	29–2–1	Jose Peterson	PTS	8	13 Mar, 1973	Empire Pool, London, England	
31	Win	28–2–1	Danny McAloon	UD	10	14 Feb, 1973	Las Vegas Convention Center, Winchester, Nevada, U.S.	
30	Win	27–2–1	Otha Tyson	KO	3 (10)	15 Jan, 1973	Nottingham Ice Stadium, Nottingham, England	
29	Win	26–2–1	David Melendez	TKO	7 (10)	5 Dec, 1972	Royal Albert Hall, London, England	
28	Loss	25–2–1	Bobby Arthur	DQ	7 (15)	31 Oct, 1972	Royal Albert Hall, London, England	For vacant British welterweight title
27	Win	25–1–1	Les Pearson	TKO	2 (12)	10 Oct, 1972	Royal Albert Hall, London, England	
26	Win	24–1–1	Joe Yekinni	TKO	2 (10)	6 Jun, 1972	Royal Albert Hall, London, England	
25	Win	23–1–1	Antonio Torres	TKO	6 (8)	22 May 1972	Piccadilly Hotel, Manchester, England	
24	Loss	22–1–1	Marshall Butler	PTS	8	25 Apr, 1972	Royal Albert Hall, London, England	
23	Win	22–0–1	Ricky Porter	PTS	8	4 Apr, 1972	York Hall, London, England	
22	Win	21–0–1	Des Rea	TKO	2 (8)	7 Mar, 1972	Royal Albert Hall, London, England	
21	Win	20–0–1	Bernie Terrell	TKO	2 (8)	15 Feb, 1972	Royal Albert Hall, London, England	
20	Win	19–0–1	Yvon Mariolle	KO	4 (8)	25 Jan, 1972	Royal Albert Hall, London, England	
19	Win	18–0–1	Guy Vercoutter	TKO	7 (10)	17 Nov, 1971	Empire Pool, London, England	
18	Win	17–0–1	Dave Wyatt	TKO	3 (8)	27 Oct, 1971	York Hall, London, England	
17	Draw	16–0–1	Frankie Lewis	PTS	8	5 Oct, 1971	Royal Albert Hall, London, England	
16	Win	16–0	Bouzid Ait Elmenceur	PTS	8	4 May 1971	York Hall, London, England	
15	Win	15–0	Dante Pelaez	PTS	8	16 Mar, 1971	Empire Pool, London, England	
14	Win	14–0	Yvon Mariolle	KO	6 (8)	23 Feb, 1971	Shoreditch Town Hall, London, England	
13	Win	13–0	Teddy Cooper	DQ	5 (8)	19 Jan, 1971	Royal Albert Hall, London, England	
12	Win	12–0	Ferdinand Ahumibe	TKO	4 (8)	8 Dec, 1970	Royal Albert Hall, London, England	
11	Win	11–0	Willie Rea	TKO	3 (8)	6 Oct, 1970	Royal Albert Hall, London, England	
10	Win	10–0	Billy Seasman	RTD	5 (8)	29 Sep, 1970	York Hall, London, England	
9	Win	8–0	David Pesenti	PTS	9	12 May 1970	Empire Pool, London, England	
8	Win	8–0	Harri Piitulainen	RTD	6 (8)	27 Apr, 1970	Royal Albert Hall, London, England	
7	Win	7–0	Bernard Martin	RTD	3 (8)	17 Mar, 1970	Shoreditch Town Hall, London, England	
6	Win	6–0	Tei Dovi	TKO	3 (8)	10 Feb, 1970	Royal Albert Hall, London, England	
5	Win	5–0	Tommy Carson	TKO	7 (8)	20 Jan, 1970	Royal Albert Hall, London, England	
4	Win	4–0	Bryn Lewis	TKO	6 (8)	9 Dec, 1969	Royal Albert Hall, London, England	
3	Win	3–0	Ray Opuku	TKO	3 (6)	18 Nov, 1969	York Hall, London, England	
2	Win	2–0	Ronnie Clifford	TKO	2 (8)	2 Oct, 1969	York Hall, London, England	
1	Win	1–0	Santos Martins	KO	2 (6)	17 Sep, 1969	York Hall, London, England	

== See also ==
- List of world welterweight boxing champions
- List of British world boxing champions

Sporting positions
Amateur boxing titles
Previous: Eamonn Cole	ABA light welterweight champion 1969	Next: Dave Davies
Regional boxing titles
Preceded by Bobby Arthur	British welterweight champion 5 June 1973 – 15 December 1975; Vacated	Vacant Title next held by Pat Thomas
Preceded by Roger Menetrey	European welterweight champion 27 May 1974 – 9 April 1976; Vacated	Vacant Title next held by Marco Scano
World boxing titles
Preceded by José Nápoles	WBC welterweight champion 6 December 1975 – 22 June 1976	Succeeded by Carlos Palomino
Preceded by José Nápoles	The Ring welterweight champion 6 December 1975 – 22 June 1976	Succeeded by Carlos Palomino
