= Ralph Charles =

English boxer (born 1943)

Personal information
- Nationality: English
- Born: 5 February 1943 (age 83) England
- Height: 5 ft 7 in (1.70 m)
- Weight: light welter/welter/light middle/middleweight

Boxing career
- Stance: Orthodox

Boxing record
- Total fights: 43
- Wins: 39 (KO 33)
- Losses: 4 (KO 3)

Ralph Charles (born 5 February 1943) is an English amateur welterweight and professional light welter/welter/light middle/middleweight boxer of the 1960s and '70s who as an amateur won the Amateur Boxing Association of England (ABAE) 1959 Junior Class-A title against Kenneth "Ken"/"Kenny" J. Cooper (Warley ABC), boxing out of West Ham Boys & ABC, won the Amateur Boxing Association of England (ABAE) 1960 Junior Class-B title against J. Harwood (National Association of Boys Clubs), boxing out of West Ham Boys & ABC, and was runner-up for the 1963 Amateur Boxing Association of England welterweight title, against Johnny Pritchett (Bingham & District ABC), boxing out of West Ham ABC, and as a professional won the British Boxing Board of Control (BBBofC) Southern Area welterweight title, BBBofC British welterweight title, European Boxing Union (EBU) welterweight title, and Commonwealth welterweight title, and was a challenger for the World Boxing Council (WBC) welterweight title, and World Boxing Association (WBA) World welterweight title against José Nápoles, his professional fighting weight varied from 140 lb (64 kg; 10 st 0 lb), i.e. light welterweight to 157 lb (71 kg; 11 st 3 lb), i.e. middleweight.
