= Ernie Lopez =

American boxer

- Photograph of Ernie Lopez, March 1, 2004, by Jennifer Long, Los Angeles Times.

Personal information
- Nickname: Indian Red
- Born: September 24, 1945 Fort Duchesne, Utah, U.S.
- Died: October 3, 2009 (aged 64) Pleasant Grove, Utah, U.S.
- Height: 5 ft 9 in (175 cm)
- Weight: Welterweight

Boxing career

Boxing record
- Total fights: 62
- Wins: 51
- Win by KO: 24
- Losses: 10
- Draws: 1

Ernie "Indian Red" Lopez (September 24, 1945 – October 3, 2009) was an American professional boxer. He twice fought for the world welterweight boxing title, losing title bouts to José Nápoles in 1970 and 1973. He was a missing person from 1992 to 2004 and was the subject of extensive press coverage in early 2004 when, after being selected for induction into the California Boxing Hall of Fame, he was found at a homeless shelter in Fort Worth, Texas.

== Early years ==
Lopez was born on the Uintah and Ouray Indian Reservation in Fort Duchesne, Utah. His mother was a Ute Indian, and his father claimed to be Juaneño, although there is no federal or state recognition for any Juaneño group.

Lopez began boxing at a very early age, being trained in grade school by Stan Chenoweth of Orem, Utah in his basement gym. He attended Orem High School in Orem, where he chose boxing over football. He married as a teenager and moved to Pasadena, California, where he boxed out of the Pasadena YMCA. He later recalled that he learned to box from his father and added, "But sometimes I learned when I watched my father hit my mother."

== Professional boxing career ==
Lopez became a popular boxer in Los Angeles during the late 1960s and early 1970s, fighting out of the Los Angeles Main Street Gym for much of his career. His brother, Danny "Little Red" Lopez, also went into boxing and became the world featherweight champion. Both of the Lopez brothers were managed by Howie Steindler.

Lopez was given the nickname "Indian Red" because of his flaming red hair and Native American heritage. In 1968, when Lopez became the first Native American boxer to be ranked as the No. 1 contender in any weight class, Pulitzer Prize winning sports writer Jim Murray wrote:

I don't know how he is as a prize fighter, but Ernie (Indian Red) Lopez certainly is disappointing as an Indian. I mean, he doesn't look like something John Wayne would chase down the street shouting something about 'damned redskin.' 'Damned redhead,' maybe. But, Lordy, the skin is even freckled! Now, whoever heard of a red-headed, freckle-skinned Indian? ... 'What was your Indian name?' I asked Indian Red? 'Ernie,' he told me.

Lopez had a career record of 51-10-1, and fought bouts in England, Hawaii, Japan and Mexico. In 1967, Lopez wore an Indian chief's headdress into the ring in a match against Musahi Nakano in Japan. Lopez said, "I bought the thing at Disneyland to take over with me. ... I liked it so much I was going to keep it. But it turned out they have this custom in Japan where the fighters exchange gifts before the fight. Nakano gave me a samurai warrior's jacket and I gave him the headpiece."

Lopez's three bouts against Hedgemon Lewis in the late 1960s drew extensive media coverage. Going into the first fight in July 1968, Hedgemon Lewis was undefeated in 23 bouts, and both fighters were considered top contenders in the welterweight class. Lopez won the first bout in a ninth-round knockout, which the Los Angeles Times described as follows:

Like Gen. Custer at Little Big Horn, Hedgemon Lewis got to wondering where all those Indians were coming from. And like his ancestors, Ernie (Indian Red) Lopez staged a fistic massacre Thursday night when he battered the previously unbeaten Lewis into a state of helplessness before a roaring turnaway mob of 10,400 at the Olympic Auditorium.

Lopez won two out of the three bouts with Lewis. In 2004, Lewis said of Lopez, "He was aggressive and always on the attack. Ernie was a crowd-pleaser because he was a fighter. Period. He fought." Actor Ryan O'Neal, who managed Lewis when Lewis fought Lopez, added, "Lopez was a warrior. He was also a gentleman, a decent man. But as a fighter, Lopez would hit the other guy so much he would become exhausted. Because of that, Lopez would always fill an arena, because he would give the fans their money's worth.... It was his heart that made him win." Another writer said of him, "He was an aggressive fighter who knew only one direction: forward."

== Title bouts against José Nápoles ==
On February 14, 1970, Lopez got a shot at the world welterweight boxing title in a bout against Cuban Jose "Mantequilla" Nápoles in front of a sellout crowd at The Forum in Inglewood, California. Lopez was knocked down in the 1st, 9th, and 15th rounds before the bout was called as a technical knockout in the 15th round. In 1971, boxing writer Dan Hafner said of Lopez:

It is the misfortune of Ernie (Indian Red) Lopez to come along when one of the all-time greats, José Nápoles, rules the welterweight division. The fiery, part-Ute Indian demonstrated beyond doubt on Thursday night that he is the class of the rest of the 147-pounders. In his smartest and possibly best fight of his career, Lopez pounded out a unanimous, one-sided 10-round decision over highly regarded Oscar Albarado and gave a masterful performance.

Sugar Ray Leonard, who watched Nápoles fight Lopez, shared a similar opinion, "If it wasn't for Nápoles, Ernie probably would have been champion."

Lopez got a rematch against Nápoles, and a second shot at the title, three years later on February 28, 1973—again in front of a sellout crowd at The Forum. The second bout proved to be a turning point in Lopez's life. Lopez had reportedly won the first six rounds, and Nápoles had cuts above and below his eye and on the bridge of his nose. At the start of the seventh round, Nápoles hit Lopez squarely in the face, and Lopez fell to the canvas, where he lay unconscious for three minutes. After the knockout, Nápoles cradled Lopez's head and repeated, "Please wake up. Please wake up."

== Wanderer and missing person ==
Reports indicate that Lopez's life went into a tailspin after the 1973 loss to Nápoles. He fought two more bouts and lost both in technical knockouts. He was divorced from his wife and took to a life of wandering. His brother, Danny Lopez, said, "It was the losses to Nápoles and the divorce that sent Ernie into a tailspin. He was a hurt man." Lopez's ex-wife also attributed the decline to the loss to Nápoles: "I think he lost confidence, his goal was destroyed. He was depressed and angry. We started having marital problems."

For twelve years from 1992 through 2004, Lopez was out of touch with his family and was considered a missing person. His ex-wife said, "The last time I saw him, he was kind of a street person. That was in 1992. He gave up all of his possessions and then went out in the world like a person wandering. It was really sad because he just gave up."

== Rediscovery and Hall of Fame ==
In early 2004, Lopez was selected for induction into the California Boxing Hall of Fame. With the impetus of the Hall of Fame induction ceremony, a police officer with the Los Angeles Police Department agreed to assist Lopez's family in trying to locate him. In February 2004, Lopez was discovered living in a homeless shelter in Fort Worth, Texas. When contacted by his ex-wife in 2004, Lopez stated, "I'm not lost. I'm right here." On learning of his selection for the Hall of Fame, Lopez told the Los Angeles Times, "Why are they doing this for me? I wasn't good enough for the Hall of Fame." Shortly thereafter, Lopez was re-united with his four children and 23 grandchildren.

Lopez's story became the subject of multiple newspaper and television stories, with reporters and television camera crews coming to the homeless shelter to interview him. He told the Los Angeles Times at the time that he did not recall why he moved to Fort Worth, but he recalled "living with a church family in Missouri, shoveling snow for a hotel owner in Portland, Maine, sleeping in New York's Central Park, working construction in Florida and cleaning hotel rooms in Phoenix." He told another reporter, "I've been all over the United States. Might have missed a few states, but it's sure a nice place. But I never stayed too long anywhere."

== Death ==
On October 3, 2009, Lopez died in Pleasant Grove, Utah from complications of dementia at age 64.

== Professional boxing record ==
48 Wins (24 knockouts, 24 decisions), 13 Losses (6 knockouts, 7 decisions), 1 Draw Archived 2015-04-29 at the Wayback Machine
| Result | Record | Opponent | Type | Round | Date | Location | Notes |
| Loss | 7-2 | (United States) Kenny Louis | KO | 1 | 07/07/1987 | (United States) Omni New Daisy Theater, Memphis, Tennessee, U.S. | |
| Loss | 38-3-1 | (United Kingdom) John Stracey | TKO | 7 | 29/10/1974 | (United Kingdom) Royal Albert Hall, London, England | Referee stopped the bout at 2:25 of the seventh round. |
| Loss | 27-4-1 | (United States) Armando Muniz | TKO | 7 | 26/07/1973 | (United States) Olympic Auditorium, Los Angeles, California, U.S. | |
| Loss | 74-5 | (Cuba) Jose Napoles | KO | 7 | 28/02/1973 | (United States) Inglewood Forum, Inglewood, California, U.S. | WBC/WBA Welterweight Titles. Lopez knocked out at 1:36 of the seventh round. |
| Win | 15-16 | (Mexico) Jose Luis Baltazar | KO | 5 | 10/11/1972 | (United States) Los Angeles Sports Arena, Los Angeles, California, U.S. | |
| Win | 59-25-6 | (United States) Manuel Gonzalez | RTD | 5 | 12/10/1972 | (United States) Sahara Tahoe, Stateline, Nevada, U.S. | |
| Loss | 73-12 | (United States Virgin Islands) Emile Griffith | UD | 10 | 30/03/1972 | (United States) Olympic Auditorium, Los Angeles, California, U.S. | |
| Win | 28-4-1 | (Mexico) Sal Martinez | TKO | 3 | 20/01/1972 | (United States) Olympic Auditorium, Los Angeles, California, U.S. | Referee stopped the bout at 1:28 of the third round. |
| Win | 39-4-1 | (United States) Oscar Albarado | UD | 10 | 28/10/1971 | (United States) Olympic Auditorium, Los Angeles, California, U.S. | |
| Win | 16-2 | (United States) Manuel Fierro | UD | 10 | 16/09/1971 | (United States) Olympic Auditorium, Los Angeles, California, U.S. | |
| Win | 22-21-2 | (United States) "Dangerous" Danny Perez | TKO | 2 | 08/07/1971 | (United States) Olympic Auditorium, Los Angeles, California, U.S. | |
| Loss | 68-11 | (United States Virgin Islands) Emile Griffith | MD | 10 | 03/05/1971 | (United States) Nevada Sports Palace, Las Vegas, Nevada, U.S. | |
| Win | 40-42-3 | (Ghana) Peter Cobblah | MD | 10 | 20/01/1971 | (United States) Silver Slipper, Las Vegas, Nevada, U.S. | |
| Win | 13-9-2 | (United States) Cipriano Hernandez | UD | 10 | 10/10/1970 | (United States) Valley Music Theater, Woodland Hills, California, U.S. | |
| Win | 20-15-1 | (Mexico) Ruben "Sandwich" Rivera | KO | 6 | 03/08/1970 | (United States) Sacramento, California, U.S. | |
| Win | 25-17-3 | (Mexico) Manuel Avitia | KO | 8 | 08/07/1970 | (United States) Las Vegas, Nevada, U.S. | |
| Loss | 62-4 | (Cuba) Jose Napoles | TKO | 15 | 14/02/1970 | (United States) Inglewood Forum, Inglewood, California, U.S. | WBC/WBA Welterweight Titles. Referee stopped the bout at 2:38 of the 15th round. |
| Win | 28-1 | (United States) Hedgemon Lewis | TKO | 10 | 04/10/1969 | (United States) Los Angeles Sports Arena, Los Angeles, California, U.S. | Referee stopped the bout at 2:33 of the tenth round. |
| Loss | 27-1 | (United States) Hedgemon Lewis | UD | 10 | 10/07/1969 | (United States) Olympic Auditorium, Los Angeles, California, U.S. | |
| Win | 72-11-2 | (Mexico) Chucho Garcia | UD | 10 | 13/03/1969 | (United States) Olympic Auditorium, Los Angeles, California, U.S. | |
| Win | 26-20 | (United States) Brad Silas | KO | 1 | 18/02/1969 | (United States) Los Angeles Memorial Coliseum, Los Angeles, California, U.S. | Silas knocked out at 2:35 of the first round. |
| Win | 40-12-1 | (Mexico) Raul Soriano | TKO | 9 | 30/01/1969 | (United States) Olympic Auditorium, Los Angeles, California, U.S. | Referee stopped the bout at 2:25 of the ninth round. |
| Win | 7-27-3 | (Mexico) Polo Corona | PTS | 10 | 31/07/1968 | (United States) Silver Slipper, Las Vegas, Nevada, U.S. | |
| Win | 22-0 | (United States) Hedgemon Lewis | TKO | 9 | 18/07/1968 | (United States) Olympic Auditorium, Los Angeles, California, U.S. | Referee stopped the bout at 1:48 of the ninth round. |
| Win | 32-10 | (United States) Gabe Terronez | UD | 12 | 30/04/1968 | (United States) Selland Arena, Fresno, California, U.S. | |
| Loss | 33-12-1 | (Mexico) Raul Soriano | UD | 10 | 03/03/1968 | Mexicali, Baja California, Mexico | |
| Win | 14-1 | (United States) Bob "Robert" Murray | UD | 10 | 08/02/1968 | (United States) Olympic Auditorium, Los Angeles, California, U.S. | |
| Win | 21-19-1 | (United States) Doug McLeod | KO | 4 | 20/11/1967 | (United States) Las Vegas, Nevada, U.S. | |
| Win | 23-16-2 | (Mexico) José Valenzuela | TKO | 10 | 12/10/1967 | (United States) Olympic Auditorium, Los Angeles, California, U.S. | Referee stopped the bout at 2:35 of the tenth round. |
| Win | 29-3-3 | (Japan) Musashi Nakano | KO | 3 | 08/08/1967 | Nagoya, Japan | Nakano knocked out at 0:47 of the third round. |
| Win | 5-2 | (Mexico) Andy Gonzalez | KO | 7 | 06/07/1967 | (United States) Olympic Auditorium, Los Angeles, California, U.S. | California Welterweight Title. Gonzalez knocked out at 2:58 of the seventh round. |
| Win | 2-2-1 | (Guam) Phil Robinson | PTS | 10 | 13/06/1967 | (United States) Honolulu, Hawaii, U.S. | |
| Win | 8-16 | (United States) Ed McGruder | PTS | 10 | 22/05/1967 | (United States) Las Vegas, Nevada, U.S. | |
| Win | 17-17-4 | (United States) Frank Jennings | TKO | 8 | 20/04/1967 | (United States) Olympic Auditorium, Los Angeles, California, U.S. | Referee stopped the bout at 2:15 of the eighth round. |
| Win | 37-14-5 | (United States) Johnny Brooks | PTS | 10 | 27/03/1967 | (United States) Las Vegas, Nevada, U.S. | |
| Win | 30-24-4 | (United States) Benito Juarez | PTS | 10 | 06/03/1967 | (United States) Las Vegas, Nevada, U.S. | |
| Loss | 16-5-2 | (United States) Adolph Pruitt | UD | 10 | 12/12/1966 | (United States) Silver Slipper, Las Vegas, Nevada, U.S. | |
| Loss | 31-12-5 | (United States) Johnny Brooks | SD | 10 | 19/09/1966 | (United States) Silver Slipper, Las Vegas, Nevada, U.S. | |
| Win | 31-11-5 | (United States) Johnny Brooks | PTS | 10 | 22/08/1966 | (United States) Silver Slipper, Las Vegas, Nevada, U.S. | |
| Win | 34-11-5 | (Panama) Tito Marshall | UD | 10 | 21/06/1966 | (United States) Las Vegas Convention Center, Las Vegas, Nevada, U.S. | |
| Win | 27-6-2 | (Cuba) Jose Stable | UD | 10 | 09/05/1966 | (United States) Hacienda Hotel, Las Vegas, Nevada, U.S. | |
| Win | 27-10-4 | (United States) Johnny Brooks | UD | 12 | 04/04/1966 | (United States) Hacienda Hotel, Las Vegas, Nevada, U.S. | |
| Win | 19-7-3 | (United States) Al Grant | PTS | 10 | 28/02/1966 | (United States) Las Vegas, Nevada, U.S. | |
| Win | 2-2-2 | (United States) Mel Fields | TKO | 3 | 14/02/1966 | (United States) Hacienda Hotel, Las Vegas, Nevada, U.S. | |
| Win | 12-16-1 | (Mexico) Memo Lopez | KO | 6 | 31/01/1966 | (United States) Las Vegas Convention Center, Las Vegas, Nevada, U.S. | Lopez knocked out at 2:14 of the sixth round. |
| Win | 26-33-5 | (United States) Al Andrews | PTS | 10 | 17/01/1966 | (United States) Las Vegas, Nevada, U.S. | |
| Win | 25-15-2 | (Mexico) Pulga Serrano | TKO | 4 | 20/12/1965 | (United States) Hacienda Hotel, Las Vegas, Nevada, U.S. | Referee stopped the bout at 1:32 of the fourth round. |
| Win | 8-2-1 | (United States) Armand Laurenco Laurinco | KO | 1 | 06/12/1965 | (United States) Hacienda Hotel, Las Vegas, Nevada, U.S. | Laurinco knocked out at 2:47 of the first round. |
| Draw | 8-2 | (United States) Armand Laurenco Laurinco | PTS | 6 | 09/11/1965 | (United States) Las Vegas, Nevada, U.S. | |
| Win | 13-12-3 | (United States) Billy Marsh | PTS | 6 | 01/11/1965 | (United States) Hacienda Hotel, Las Vegas, Nevada, U.S. | |
| Loss | 12-1 | (United States) Don Minor | UD | 12 | 22/12/1964 | (United States) Hacienda Hotel, Las Vegas, Nevada, U.S. | North American Welterweight Title. |
| Win | 6-2-1 | (United States) Chappell Funnye | KO | 8 | 19/10/1964 | (United States) Santa Monica Civic Auditorium, Santa Monica, California, U.S. | |
| Win | 5-0 | (United States) Bernie Magallanes | PTS | 6 | 29/09/1964 | (United States) Castaways Hotel, Las Vegas, Nevada, U.S. | |
| Loss | 11-3-1 | (Mexico) Jesse Armenta | KO | 9 | 04/07/1964 | Hermosillo, Sonora, Mexico | |
| Win | 3-1 | (United States) Joe Clark | PTS | 6 | 12/06/1964 | (United States) Las Vegas Convention Center, Las Vegas, Nevada, U.S. | |
| Win | 22-8-6 | (Mexico) Andrés Herrera | PTS | 6 | 30/03/1964 | (United States) Santa Monica Civic Auditorium, Santa Monica, California, U.S. | |
| Win | 0-2 | (United States) George Green | KO | 5 | 10/03/1964 | (United States) Castaways Hotel, Las Vegas, Nevada, U.S. | |
| Win | -- | Trini Lopez | PTS | 4 | 03/03/1964 | (United States) Valley Garden Arena, North Hollywood, California, U.S. | |
| Win | 9-4-1 | (United States) Mickey Davitt | KO | 1 | 13/02/1964 | (United States) Olympic Auditorium, Los Angeles, California, U.S. | |
| Win | 3-3-3 | (United States) Carl Moore | KO | 3 | 04/02/1964 | (United States) Castaways Hotel, Las Vegas, Nevada, U.S. | |
| Win | -- | (United States) Armand Laurenco Laurinco | PTS | 6 | 21/01/1964 | (United States) Castaways Hotel, Las Vegas, Nevada, U.S. | |
| Win | -- | (United States) John Coopride | KO | 2 | 24/06/1963 | (United States) Fairgrounds Coliseum, Salt Lake City, Utah, U.S. | Coopride knocked out at 1:04 of the second round. |
