= Fists of Steel =

1988 American action film

Fists of Steel is a 1989 American straight-to-video film. It stars Carlos Palomino, Henry Silva, Marianne Marks, Kenny Kerr, Sam Melville, Robert Tessier, Alexis Arguello and Rockne Tarkington. The film was written, produced and directed by Jerry Schafer. Apart from Palomino and Arguello, other former professional boxers appear in supporting roles, namely Ruben Castillo, Danny Lopez and Armando Muniz. The film was released in the United States on February 17, 1989.

== Synopsis ==
A terrorist organization based in Hawaii, headed by "Shogui", has murdered several of their rivals, including the father of former world boxing champion and Vietnam War veteran "Carlos Diaz". The Central Intelligence Agency gets involved, recruiting Diaz, who in turn recruits "Alex" and a group of other former boxers to help fight the terrorists. Diaz then travels to Hawaii to confront the terrorists.

== Production ==
The film is former world welterweight champion Palomino’s acting debut. It was filmed on Oʻahu island in Hawaii for 10 weeks from May 23, 1988.

== Reception ==
Commenting on Palomino's choice to play in the film, the Los Angeles Times wrote, ”Not a potential masterpiece, but Lee Majors made a living playing a bionic guy, so why not?’
