= José Nápoles =

Cuban-born Mexican boxer (1940–2019)

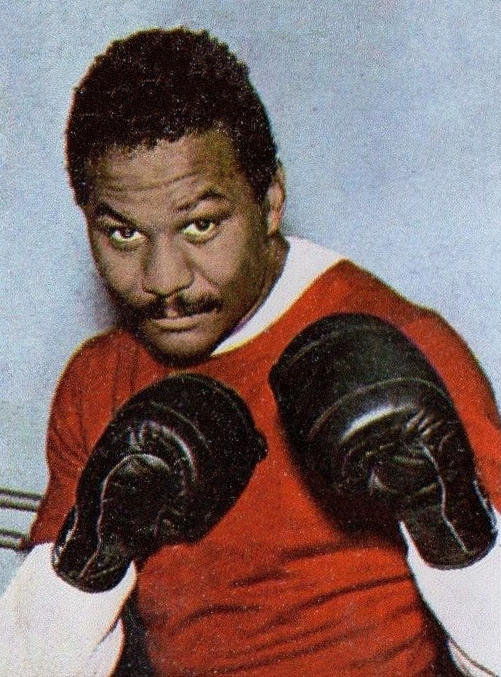
- Nápoles c. 1973

Personal information
- Nickname: Mantequilla ("Butter")
- Nationality: Mexican
- Born: José Ángel Nápoles; April 13, 1940 Santiago de Cuba, Cuba
- Died: August 16, 2019 (aged 79) Mexico City, Mexico
- Height: 5 ft 7 1/2 in (171 cm)
- Weight: Featherweight; Lightweight; Welterweight; Middleweight

Boxing career
- Reach: 72 in (183 cm)
- Stance: Orthodox

Boxing record
- Total fights: 88
- Wins: 81
- Win by KO: 54
- Losses: 7

José Ángel Nápoles (April 13, 1940 – August 16, 2019) was a Cuban-born Mexican professional boxer. He was a two-time undisputed welterweight champion, having held the WBA, WBC, and The Ring welterweight titles between 1969 and 1975. He is frequently ranked as one of the greatest fighters of all time in that division and is a member of the International Boxing Hall of Fame. His record of the most wins in unified championship bouts in boxing history, shared with Muhammad Ali, was unbeaten for 40 years. After debuting professionally in Cuba, he fought out of Mexico and became a Mexican citizen.

== Mexico ==
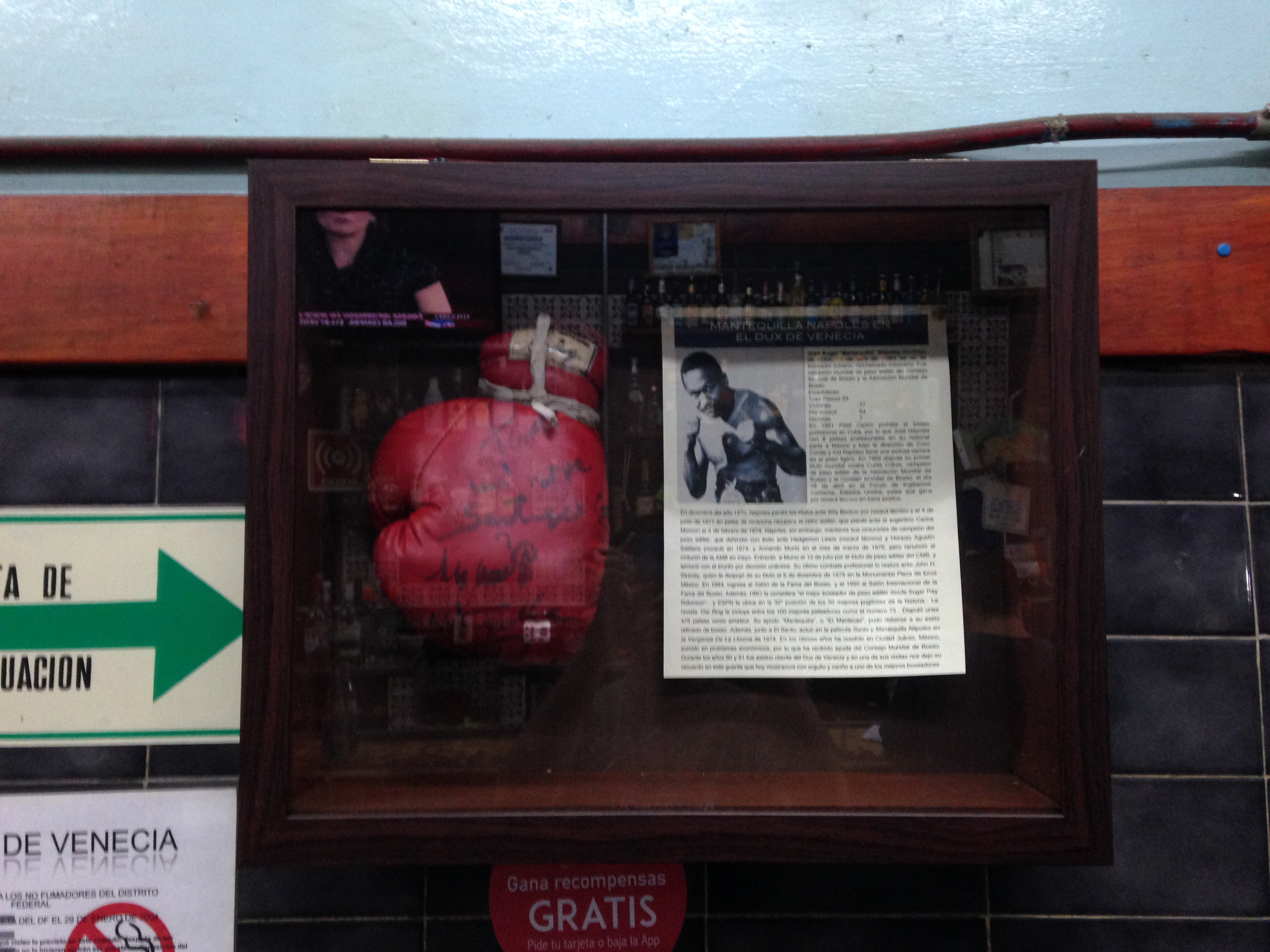
Boxing glove of Mantequilla Nápoles at El Dux de Venecia bar in Mexico City.

Nápoles debuted as a professional boxer on August 2, 1958, in Cuba, knocking out Julio Rojas in the first round. Nápoles' first 21 bouts were in Cuba, against mostly unknown competition. He did beat Ángel García and Leslie Grant, but lost to Hilton Smith (in his first defeat).

After beating Enrique Carabeo in March 1961, Nápoles found himself a new challenge, outside of the ring; Cuban president Fidel Castro banned professional boxing in Cuba, and Nápoles soon found his career in jeopardy.

He found asylum in Mexico, where he soon found himself back inside the ring, beating Enrique Camarena by a knockout in two rounds on July 21, 1962. He won all four of his fights that year.

In 1963, he won seven bouts and lost two. He was defeated by Tony Perez and Alfredo Urbina, both by decision, but he beat JC Morgan, by knockout in seven rounds, in Venezuela.

1964 was a successful year for Nápoles. He travelled to Japan, where he beat Taketeru Yoshimoto by knockout in round one, and he beat future world champion Carlos Morocho Hernández by knockout in round seven, this time back in Venezuela. In addition to those wins, he avenged his loss to Urbina by knocking him out twice, the first time in the first round and the second time in the third.

He won three more fights in 1965, including another win against Morgan, before seeing a raise in opposition quality when he faced the former world Junior Welterweight champion Eddie Perkins, beating him by decision in ten rounds. For his next fight, he met his own future world title challenger, Adolph Pruitt, beating him by knockout in round three.

In 1966, he won five fights, all by knockout, and lost one, to arch-rival Morgan, who knocked him out in round four. This would be his last loss in four years.

== Welterweight champion ==
Nápoles began a streak of 20 wins in a row, 13 of them before challenging for the world's welterweight title. These included avenging the loss to Morgan with a two-round knockout. During this period, Nápoles also became a fan favorite in southern California, and, after beating Fate Davis, on February 15, 1969, in Mexico, he was given an opportunity to win the world championship when he faced the then-current champion Curtis Cokes in Inglewood, on April 18. Nápoles beat Cokes by a knockout in round 13 to become world welterweight champion, and, as was becoming common place for him, he wore a sombrero after the fight. On June 29, he retained the title in a rematch with Cokes by a knockout in round 10 in his hometown of Mexico City, and on October 12, he outpointed former world champion Emile Griffith in 15, also retaining the title.

== Loss of title ==
Nápoles began the 1970s, by defeating Ernie "Indian Red" Lopez by a knockout in round 15 in front of an audience that included former world champion Sugar Ray Robinson on February 14, 1970. But after winning two non-title bouts, he suffered an upset when he was stopped due to being cut in four rounds by Carmen Basilio's nephew Billy Backus, who took the world's Welterweight title from Nápoles on December 3 at Syracuse.

== Regaining the title ==
After winning one more fight, he and Backus fought again, for the world welterweight title now in Backus' hands. This time, it was held in Los Angeles, and Nápoles recovered the world championship via an 8th round stoppage. After three non-title wins, including one over Jean Josselin, he faced Hedgemon Lewis on December 14, retaining the world title with a decision in 15 rounds, but Nápoles' training habits were suffering; he was alleged to be coming into the gym stinking of alcohol with an attitude towards his seconds.

In 1972, he retained the title knocking out Ralph Charles in seven in England, and then, Pruitt resurfaced again, this time with the world Welterweight title on the line. Nápoles retained his crown by knockout in round two.

World traveller Nápoles began 1973 by retaining the title against Lopez again, by knockout in seven, then he visited Grenoble, France, where he retained the crown with a 15-round decision over Roger Menetrey, and Toronto, Ontario, Canada where he beat Clyde Gray, once again retaining the world title with a 15-round decision.

== Middleweight ==
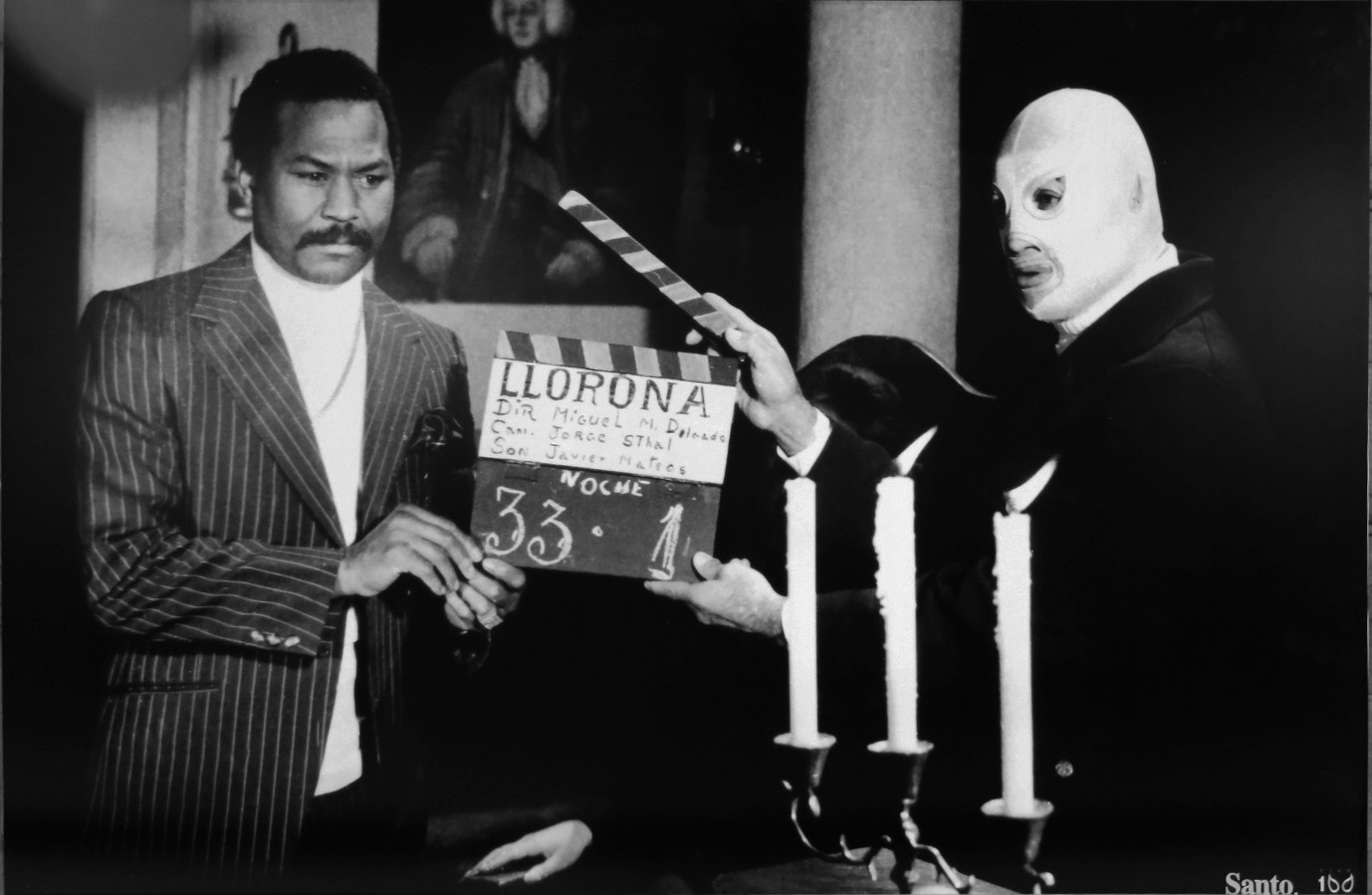
Nápoles with El Santo during the filming of Santo y Mantequilla Nápoles en la venganza de la Llorona (1974)

After this, many boxing fans were asking for a fight between Nápoles and world middleweight champion Carlos Monzón. The fight was made possible when Nápoles moved in weight to challenge Monzon for Monzon's title, so the two dueled on February 9, 1974, at a ring set up inside a circus tent that had been erected in the Paris suburb of Puteaux. This would be Nápoles' only bout at the middleweight division, as he was defeated by quitting the match, officially losing by a seventh-round technical knockout. He then went back to the welterweight division, and retained the title twice before the year ended, with a knockout in nine over Lewis, and with a knockout in three over Horacio Saldaño.

In 1975, Nápoles had two wins over Armando Muniz, both times to retain his world title. The first time, a technical decision win in 12 rounds at Acapulco was a controversial win, so a return match was fought in Los Angeles, where Nápoles prevailed by decision.

== Retirement ==
On December 6 of that year, however, Nápoles lost his title to British boxer John H. Stracey, who won over Nápoles by a technical knockout in round six at Mexico City despite being floored by Nápoles in round one. After this fight, Nápoles announced his retirement. He was able to stay away from the temptation of a comeback.

Nápoles had a final record of 81 wins and 7 losses, with 54 wins by knockout, which makes him a member of the exclusive group of boxers that won 50 or more fights by knockout in their careers.

== Personal life ==
Napoles was the son of Pedro Napoles, a schoolteacher, and his wife Rosa. He had a brother, Pedro Napoles Jr. and nine children. He resided in Ciudad Juárez, Chihuahua, Mexico, with his wife Bertha.

Napoles co-starred with superstar Santo in a 1974 Mexican wrestler/horror film called Santo en la venganza de la llorona, aka Santo and Mantequilla Napoles in the Revenge of the Crying Woman.

Nápoles died on August 16, 2019, in Mexico City, after a long-illness at the age of 79.

== Honours ==
In 1985, Nápoles was inducted into The Ring boxing hall of fame, and in 1990 into the International Boxing Hall of Fame.

== Professional boxing record ==
88 fights	81 wins	7 losses
By knockout	54	4
By decision	26	3
By disqualification	1	0

No.	Result	Record	Opponent	Type	Round	Date	Location	Notes
88	Loss	81–7	John H. Stracey	TKO	6 (15)	Dec 6, 1975	Monumental Plaza de Toros, México, Mexico City, Distrito Federal, Mexico	Lost WBC and The Ring welterweight titles
87	Win	81–6	Armando Muñíz	UD	15	Jul 12, 1975	Palacio de los Deportes, Mexico City, Distrito Federal, Mexico	Retained WBC and The Ring welterweight titles
86	Win	80–6	Armando Muñíz	TD	12 (15)	Mar 29, 1975	Centro Internacional Acapulco, Acapulco, Guerrero, Mexico	Retained WBA, WBC, and The Ring welterweight titles
85	Win	79–6	Horacio Agustin Saldano	KO	3 (15)	Dec 14, 1974	Palacio de los Deportes, Mexico City, Distrito Federal, Mexico	Retained WBA, WBC, and The Ring welterweight titles
84	Win	78–6	Hedgemon Lewis	TKO	9 (15)	Aug 3, 1974	Palacio de los Deportes, Mexico City, Distrito Federal, Mexico	Retained WBA, WBC, and The Ring welterweight titles
83	Loss	77–6	Carlos Monzon	RTD	6 (15)	Feb 9, 1974	Puteaux, Hauts-de-Seine, France	For WBA, WBC, and The Ring middleweight titles
82	Win	77–5	Clyde Gray	UD	15	Sep 22, 1973	Maple Leaf Gardens, Toronto, Ontario, Canada	Retained WBA, WBC, and The Ring welterweight titles
81	Win	76–5	Roger Menetrey	UD	15	Jun 23, 1973	Palais des Sports, Grenoble, Isère, France	Retained WBA, WBC, and The Ring welterweight titles
80	Win	75–5	Ernie Lopez	KO	7 (15)	Feb 28, 1973	Forum, Inglewood, California, U.S.	Retained WBA, WBC, and The Ring welterweight titles
79	Win	74–5	Edmundo Leite	TKO	2 (10)	Aug 5, 1972	Palacio de los Deportes, Mexico City, Distrito Federal, Mexico	
78	Win	73–5	Adolph Pruitt	TKO	2 (15)	Jun 10, 1972	Plaza de Toros, Monumental, Monterrey, Nuevo León, Mexico	Retained WBA, WBC, and The Ring welterweight titles
77	Win	72–5	Ralph Charles	KO	7 (15)	Mar 28, 1972	Empire Pool, Wembley, London, England	Retained WBA, WBC, and The Ring welterweight titles
76	Win	71–5	Hedgemon Lewis	UD	15	Dec 14, 1971	Forum, Inglewood, California, U.S.	Retained WBA, WBC, and The Ring welterweight titles
75	Win	70–5	Esteban Alfredo Osuna	UD	10	Oct 16, 1971	Arena Mexico, Mexico City, Distrito Federal, Mexico	
74	Win	69–5	Jean Josselin	KO	5 (10)	Aug 23, 1971	Forum, Inglewood, California, U.S.	
73	Win	68–5	David Melendez	TKO	5 (10)	Jul 31, 1971	Arena Coliseo, Monterrey, Nuevo León, Mexico	
72	Win	67–5	Billy Backus	TKO	8 (15)	Jun 4, 1971	Forum, Inglewood, California, U.S.	Won WBA, WBC, NYSAC, and The Ring welterweight titles
71	Win	66–5	Manuel Gonzalez	KO	6 (10)	Mar 27, 1971	Arena Mexico, Mexico City, Distrito Federal, Mexico	
70	Loss	65–5	Billy Backus	TKO	4 (15)	Dec 3, 1970	War Memorial Auditorium, Syracuse, New York, U.S.	Lost WBA, WBC, NYSAC, and The Ring welterweight titles
69	Win	65–4	Pete Toro	TKO	9 (10)	Oct 5, 1970	Madison Square Garden, New York City, New York, U.S.	
68	Win	64–4	Fighting Mack	KO	3 (10)	Aug 14, 1970	Forum, Inglewood, California, U.S.	
67	Win	63–4	Ernie Lopez	TKO	15 (15)	Feb 14, 1970	Forum, Inglewood, California, U.S.	Retained WBA, WBC, NYSAC, and The Ring welterweight titles
66	Win	62–4	Emile Griffith	UD	15	Oct 17, 1969	Forum, Inglewood, California, U.S.	Retained WBA, WBC, NYSAC, and The Ring welterweight titles
65	Win	61–4	Curtis Cokes	RTD	10 (15)	Jun 29, 1969	Monumental Plaza de Toros, México, Mexico City, Distrito Federal, Mexico	Retained WBA, WBC, NYSAC, and The Ring welterweight titles
64	Win	60–4	Curtis Cokes	RTD	13 (15)	Apr 18, 1969	Forum, Inglewood, California, U.S.	Won WBA, WBC, NYSAC, and The Ring welterweight titles
63	Win	59–4	Fate Davis	TKO	6 (10)	Feb 15, 1969	Arena Mexico, Mexico City, Distrito Federal, Mexico	
62	Win	58–4	Lennox Beckles	KO	1 (10)	Dec 22, 1968	Monumental Plaza de Toros, México, Mexico City, Distrito Federal, Mexico	
61	Win	57–4	Des Rea	TKO	5 (10)	Nov 4, 1968	Forum, Inglewood, California, U.S.	
60	Win	56–4	Eddie Pace	UD	10	Jul 15, 1968	Plaza de Toros, Tijuana, Baja California, Mexico	
59	Win	55–4	Leroy Roberts	TKO	1 (10)	Jun 14, 1968	Forum, Inglewood, California, U.S.	
58	Win	54–4	Peter Cobblah	PTS	10	Jun 2, 1968	Monumental Plaza de Toros, México, Mexico City, Distrito Federal, Mexico	
57	Win	53–4	Herbie Lee	TKO	6 (10)	Apr 29, 1968	Plaza de Toros, Tijuana, Baja California, Mexico	
56	Win	52–4	Mike Cruz	TKO	4 (10)	Feb 18, 1968	Tampico, Tamaulipas, Mexico	
55	Win	51–4	Charlie Watson	KO	6 (10)	Dec 3, 1967	Merida, Yucatán, Mexico	
54	Win	50–4	Johnny DePeiza	TKO	1 (10)	Sep 11, 1967	Plaza de Toros, Ciudad Juarez, Chihuahua, Mexico	
53	Win	49–4	LC Morgan	TKO	2 (10)	Jul 10, 1967	Plaza de Toros, Tijuana, Baja California, Mexico	
52	Win	48–4	Johnny Brooks	KO	7 (10)	Jun 4, 1967	Merida, Yucatán, Mexico	
51	Win	47–4	Eugenio Espinoza	TKO	6 (10)	Dec 17, 1966	El Toreo de Cuatro Caminos, Mexico City, Distrito Federal, Mexico	
50	Win	46–4	Jimmy Fields	TKO	10 (10)	Oct 30, 1966	Plaza de Toros Fermin Rivera, San Luis Potosi, San Luis Potosí, Mexico	
49	Loss	45–4	LC Morgan	TKO	4 (10)	Aug 22, 1966	Estadio Adolfo López Mateos, Reynosa, Tamaulipas, Mexico	
48	Win	45–3	Humberto Trottman	KO	2 (10)	Jul 27, 1966	Plaza de Toros, Ciudad Juarez, Chihuahua, Mexico	
47	Win	44–3	Al Grant	TKO	4 (10)	Apr 17, 1966	Reynosa, Tamaulipas, Mexico	
46	Win	43–3	Johnny Santos	KO	3 (10)	Feb 12, 1966	Monumental Plaza de Toros, México, Mexico City, Distrito Federal, Mexico	
45	Win	42–3	Aldolph Pruitt	TKO	3 (10)	Dec 11, 1965	El Toreo de Cuatro Caminos, Mexico City, Distrito Federal, Mexico	
44	Win	41–3	Eddie Perkins	UD	10	Aug 3, 1965	Plaza de Toros, Ciudad Juarez, Chihuahua, Mexico	
43	Win	40–3	Giordano Campari	TKO	2 (10)	Mar 25, 1965	Nuevo Circo, Caracas, Venezuela	
42	Win	39–3	LC Morgan	KO	3 (10)	Feb 28, 1965	Plaza de Toros Monumental, Monterrey, Nuevo León, Mexico	
41	Win	38–3	Carlos Rios	KO	5 (10)	Jan 1, 1965	Plaza de Toros, Torreon, Coahuila de Zaragoza, Mexico	
40	Win	37–3	Alfredo Urbina	KO	3 (10)	Nov 14, 1964	El Toreo de Cuatro Caminos, Mexico City, Distrito Federal, Mexico	
39	Win	36–3	Eduardo Moreno	TKO	5 (12)	Aug 15, 1964	Culiacan, Sinaloa, Mexico	
38	Win	35–3	Carlos Morocho Hernández	TKO	7 (10)	Jun 22, 1964	Nuevo Circo, Caracas, Venezuela	
37	Win	34–3	Alfredo Urbina	TKO	1 (10)	Apr 25, 1964	Mexico City, Distrito Federal, Mexico	
36	Win	33–3	Taketeru Yoshimoto	KO	1 (8)	Mar 1, 1964	Kokugikan, Tokyo, Japan	
35	Win	32–3	LC Morgan	KO	7 (10)	Nov 30, 1963	Caracas, Venezuela	
34	Win	31–3	Tony Perez	TKO	3 (10)	Nov 16, 1963	Mexico City, Distrito Federal, Mexico	
33	Win	30–3	Francisco Cancio	KO	1 (10)	Oct 23, 1963	Mexico City, Distrito Federal, Mexico	
32	Win	29–3	Pulga Serrano	TKO	10 (10)	Aug 19, 1963	Tijuana, Baja California, Mexico	
31	Win	28–3	Baby Vasquez	PTS	10	Jul 13, 1963	Arena Mexico, Mexico City, Distrito Federal, Mexico	
30	Win	27–3	Raul Soriano	KO	4 (10)	May 27, 1963	Tijuana, Baja California, Mexico	
29	Loss	26–3	Alfredo Urbina	PTS	10	Apr 27, 1963	Mexico City, Distrito Federal, Mexico	
28	Win	26–2	Baby Vasquez	UD	10	Mar 30, 1963	Arena Mexico, Mexico City, Distrito Federal, Mexico	
27	Win	25–2	Baby Gutierrez	TKO	7 (10)	Feb 9, 1963	Mexico City, Distrito Federal, Mexico	
26	Loss	24–2	Tony Perez	SD	10	Jan 5, 1963	Plaza de Toros, HermosilloPlaza de Toros, Los Mochis, Sinaloa, Mexico	
25	Win	24–1	Tony Perez	PTS	10	Nov 10, 1962	Plaza de Toros, Los Mochis, Plaza de Toros, Los Mochis, Sinaloa, Mexico	
24	Win	23–1	Bobby Cervantes	TKO	1 (10)	Sep 29, 1962	Mexico City, Distrito Federal, Mexico	
23	Win	22–1	Kid Anahuac	KO	9 (10)	Aug 25, 1962	Mexico City, Distrito Federal, Mexico	
22	Win	21–1	Enrique Camarena	KO	2 (10)	Jul 21, 1962	Mexico City, Distrito Federal, Mexico	
21	Win	20–1	Angel Robinson Garcia	PTS	10	Jun 3, 1961	Havana, Cuba	
20	Win	19–1	Rolando Chico Morales	UD	10	Mar 18, 1961	Havana, Cuba	
19	Win	18–1	Guillermo Valdez	UD	10	Jan 28, 1961	Havana, Cuba	
18	Win	17–1	Tony Padron	DQ	5 (10)	Dec 17, 1960	Palacio de Deportes, Havana, Cuba	
17	Win	16–1	Rolando Chico Morales	PTS	10	Nov 26, 1960	Havana, Cuba	
16	Win	15–1	Tony Padron	UD	10	Oct 15, 1960	Coliseo Nacional, Havana, Cuba	
15	Win	14–1	Bunny Grant	PTS	10	Jul 2, 1960	Havana, Cuba	
14	Win	13–1	Angel Robinson Garcia	PTS	10	May 21, 1960	Havana, Cuba	
13	Win	12–1	Diwaldo Ventosa	UD	10	Feb 20, 1960	Coliseo de la Ciudad, Havana, Cuba	
12	Win	11–1	Isaac Espinosa	UD	10	Jan 2, 1960	Coliseo de la Ciudad, Havana, Cuba	
11	Win	10–1	Bobby Cervantes	TKO	1 (10)	Nov 28, 1959	Arena Trejo, Havana, Cuba	
10	Win	9–1	Augusto Narvalle	UD	8	Nov 14, 1959	Coliseo de la Ciudad, Havana, Cuba	
9	Win	8–1	Cristobal Gonzalez	UD	8	Oct 3, 1959	Coliseo de la Ciudad, Havana, Cuba	
8	Loss	7–1	Hilton Smith	UD	8	Aug 22, 1959	Coliseo Nacional, Havana, Cuba	
7	Win	7–0	Clodoaldo Hernandez	UD	8	Jul 25, 1959	Coliseo Nacional, Havana, Cuba	
6	Win	6–0	Clodoaldo Hernandez	TKO	3 (6)	Jul 11, 1959	Coliseo Nacional, Havana, Cuba	
5	Win	5–0	Juan Bacallo	TKO	4 (6)	May 16, 1959	Coliseo Nacional, Havana, Cuba	
4	Win	4–0	Armando Castillo	PTS	4	Feb 21, 1959	Coliseo de la Ciudad, Havana, Cuba	
3	Win	3–0	Felix Pomares	TKO	2 (4)	Nov 29, 1958	Havana, Cuba	
2	Win	2–0	Euripides Guerra	TKO	4 (4)	Oct 11, 1958	Coliseo Nacional, Havana, Cuba	
1	Win	1–0	Julio Rojas	TKO	1 (4)	Aug 2, 1958	Coliseo Nacional, Havana, Cuba	

== Titles in boxing ==
=== Major world titles ===
- NYSAC welterweight champion (147 lbs) (2×)
- WBA welterweight champion (147 lbs) (2×)
- WBC welterweight champion (147 lbs) (2×)

=== The Ring magazine titles ===
- The Ring welterweight champion (147 lbs) (2×)

=== Undisputed titles ===
- Undisputed welterweight champion (2×)

== See also ==
- List of world welterweight boxing champions
- List of Mexican boxing world champions

Sporting positions
World boxing titles
Preceded by Curtis Cokes	WBA welterweight champion April 18, 1969 – December 3, 1970	Succeeded by Billy Backus
Preceded by Curtis Cokes	WBC welterweight champion April 18, 1969 – December 3, 1970	Succeeded by Billy Backus
Preceded by Curtis Cokes	The Ring welterweight champion April 18, 1969 – December 3, 1970	Succeeded by Billy Backus
Preceded by Curtis Cokes	Undisputed welterweight champion April 18, 1969 – December 3, 1970	Succeeded by Billy Backus
Preceded by Billy Backus	WBA welterweight champion June 4, 1971 – May 16, 1975; Stripped	Vacant Title next held by Ángel Espada
Preceded by Billy Backus	WBC welterweight champion June 4, 1971 – December 6, 1975	Succeeded by John H. Stracey
Preceded by Billy Backus	The Ring welterweight champion June 4, 1971 – December 6, 1975	Succeeded by John H. Stracey
Preceded by Billy Backus	Undisputed welterweight champion June 4, 1971 – May 16, 1975; Titles fragmented	Vacant Title next held by Sugar Ray Leonard
