= Roger Menetrey =

French boxer

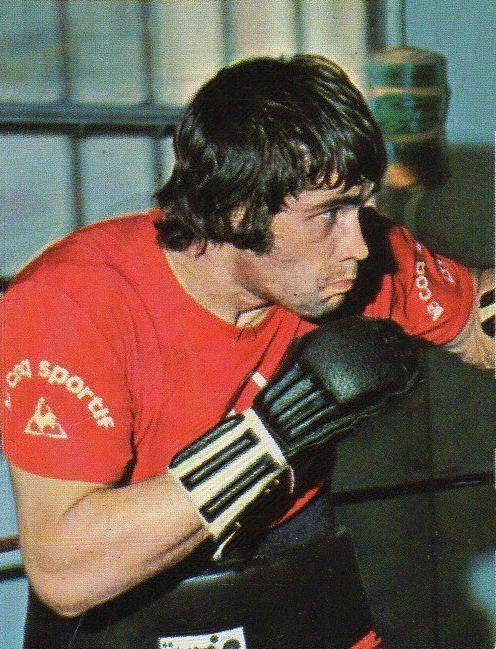
- Roger Menetrey c. 1972

Personal information
- Born: 16 June 1945 (age 81) Annemasse, France
- Weight: Welterweight

Boxing career

Boxing record
- Total fights: 59
- Wins: 52
- Win by KO: 42
- Losses: 6
- Draws: 1

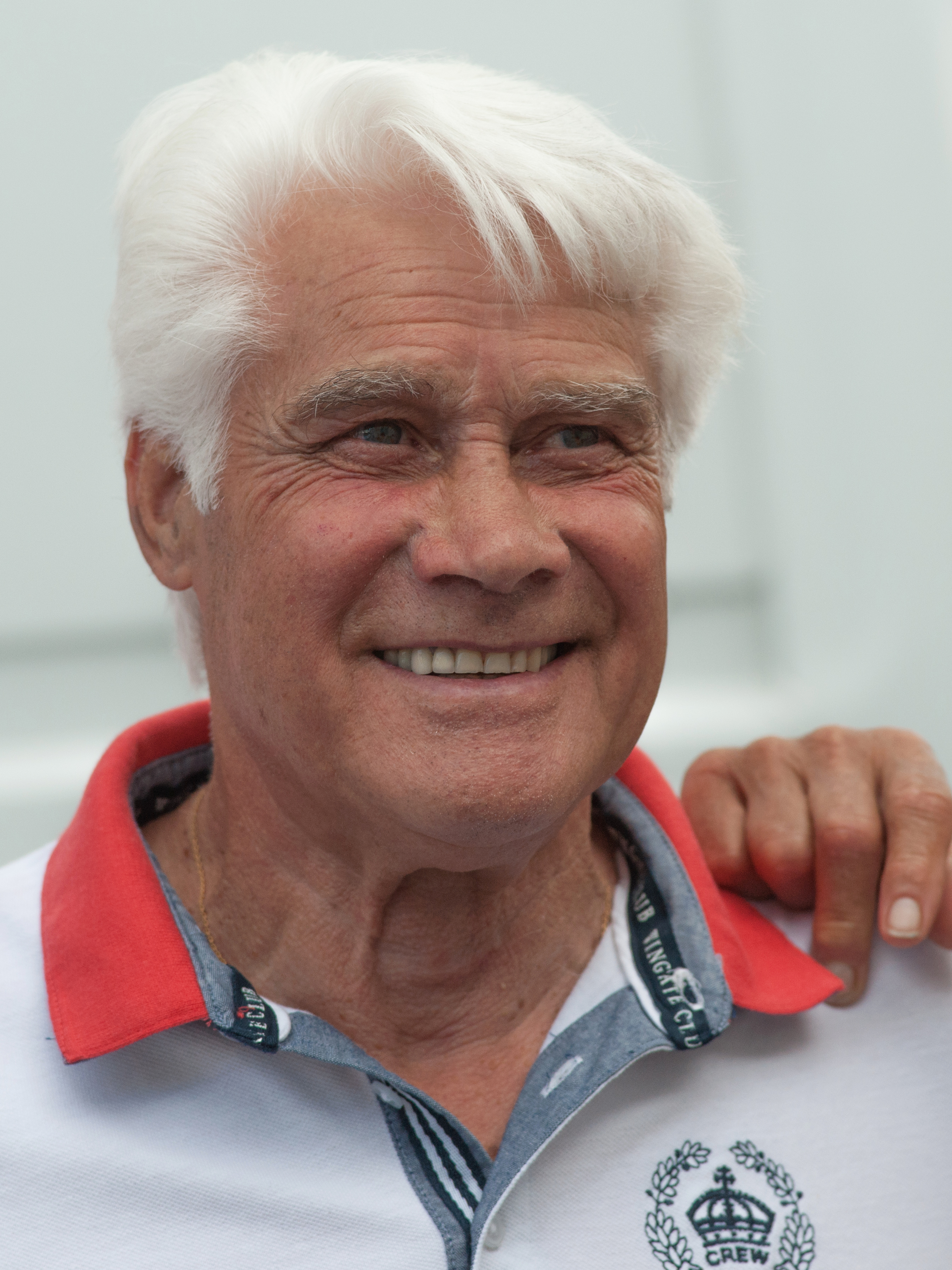
Roger Menetrey in 2014

Roger Menetrey (born 16 June 1945) is a retired French professional welterweight boxer. On 4 June 1971 he won the European Boxing Union (EBU) title and defended it five times. On 23 June 1973 he unsuccessfully contested the WBC title against José Nápoles. Menetrey retired after losing his EBU title to John H. Stracey on 27 May 1974. During his career he won 52 out of 59 bouts, 42 of them by knockout.
