= Boxing at the 1968 Summer Olympics =

Boxing at the Games of the XIX Olympiad
- Venue: Arena México
- Dates: October 13–26, 1968
- Competitors: 307 from 65 nations

The boxing programme of the 1968 Summer Olympics in Mexico City, Mexico was held at the Arena México. Medals were awarded in eleven events, with each event corresponding to a recognized weight division of male boxers.

== Medal summary ==
Event	Gold	Silver	Bronze
Light flyweight	Francisco Rodríguez; Venezuela	Jee Yong-ju; South Korea	Hubert Skrzypczak; Poland
Light flyweight	Francisco Rodríguez; Venezuela	Jee Yong-ju; South Korea	Harlan Marbley; United States
Flyweight	Ricardo Delgado; Mexico	Artur Olech; Poland	Servílio de Oliveira; Brazil
Flyweight	Ricardo Delgado; Mexico	Artur Olech; Poland	Leo Rwabwogo; Uganda
Bantamweight	Valerian Sokolov; Soviet Union	Eridadi Mukwanga; Uganda	Eiji Morioka; Japan
Bantamweight	Valerian Sokolov; Soviet Union	Eridadi Mukwanga; Uganda	Chang Kyou-chul; South Korea
Featherweight	Antonio Roldán; Mexico	Al Robinson; United States	Philip Waruinge; Kenya
Featherweight	Antonio Roldán; Mexico	Al Robinson; United States	Ivan Mihailov; Bulgaria
Lightweight	Ronnie Harris; United States	Józef Grudzień; Poland	Zvonimir Vujin; Yugoslavia
Lightweight	Ronnie Harris; United States	Józef Grudzień; Poland	Calistrat Cuțov; Romania
Light welterweight	Jerzy Kulej; Poland	Enrique Regüeiferos; Cuba	Arto Nilsson; Finland
Light welterweight	Jerzy Kulej; Poland	Enrique Regüeiferos; Cuba	Jim Wallington; United States
Welterweight	Manfred Wolke; East Germany	Joseph Bessala; Cameroon	Mario Guilloti; Argentina
Welterweight	Manfred Wolke; East Germany	Joseph Bessala; Cameroon	Vladimir Musalimov; Soviet Union
Light middleweight	Boris Lagutin; Soviet Union	Rolando Garbey; Cuba	John Baldwin; United States
Light middleweight	Boris Lagutin; Soviet Union	Rolando Garbey; Cuba	Günther Meier; West Germany
Middleweight	Chris Finnegan; Great Britain	Aleksei Kiselyov; Soviet Union	Agustín Zaragoza; Mexico
Middleweight	Chris Finnegan; Great Britain	Aleksei Kiselyov; Soviet Union	Alfred Jones; United States
Light heavyweight	Danas Pozniakas; Soviet Union	Ion Monea; Romania	Georgi Stankov; Bulgaria
Light heavyweight	Danas Pozniakas; Soviet Union	Ion Monea; Romania	Stanisław Dragan; Poland
Heavyweight	George Foreman; United States	Jonas Čepulis; Soviet Union	Giorgio Bambini; Italy
Heavyweight	George Foreman; United States	Jonas Čepulis; Soviet Union	Joaquín Rocha; Mexico

== Medal table ==
Rank	Nation	Gold	Silver	Bronze	Total
1	Soviet Union	3	2	1	6
2	United States	2	1	4	7
3	Mexico	2	0	2	4
4	Poland	1	2	2	5
5	East Germany	1	0	0	1
5	Great Britain	1	0	0	1
5	Venezuela	1	0	0	1
8	Cuba	0	2	0	2
9	Romania	0	1	1	2
9	South Korea	0	1	1	2
9	Uganda	0	1	1	2
12	Cameroon	0	1	0	1
13	Bulgaria	0	0	2	2
14	Argentina	0	0	1	1
14	Brazil	0	0	1	1
14	Finland	0	0	1	1
14	Italy	0	0	1	1
14	Japan	0	0	1	1
14	Kenya	0	0	1	1
14	West Germany	0	0	1	1
14	Yugoslavia	0	0	1	1
Totals (21 entries)		11	11	22	44

== Participating nations ==
Nation	-48kg	-51kg	-54kg	-57kg	-60kg	-63.5kg	-67kg	-71kg	-75kg	-81kg	+81kg	Total
Algeria				X			X					2
Argentina	X	X	X	X	X		X	X				7
Australia	X	X	X			X						4
Austria								X		X		2
Brazil		X					X					2
Bulgaria	X		X	X	X	X	X		X	X	X	8
Burma	X				X							2
Cameroon					X	X	X		X			4
Canada		X			X	X	X					4
Ceylon	X											1
Chile			X		X	X	X	X	X			6
Chinese Taipei		X	X		X							3
Costa Rica						X		X				2
Cuba	X	X	X	X	X		X	X	X	X	X	10
Czechoslovakia						X	X	X	X	X		5
Denmark							X	X				2
Dominican Republic					X	X						2
Ecuador			X			X						2
East Germany	X		X		X	X	X	X		X	X	8
Egypt	X			X				X		X	X	5
Ethiopia				X	X		X	X				4
Finland			X	X	X	X	X					5
France			X	X	X		X	X		X		6
Ghana	X	X	X		X	X	X				X	7
Great Britain		X	X	X	X	X	X	X	X		X	9
Greece			X				X			X		3
Guatemala			X					X				2
Guyana			X						X			2
Hungary	X	X	X		X	X	X					6
Ireland		X	X	X	X	X		X				6
Italy	X	X	X	X	X	X	X	X	X	X	X	11
Jamaica				X					X			2
Japan	X	X	X	X								4
Kenya			X	X		X		X				4
Mali										X		1
Mexico	X	X	X	X	X	X	X	X	X	X	X	11
Morocco	X	X		X			X		X			5
Netherlands									X		X	2
Nicaragua			X	X	X							3
Niger			X				X					2
Nigeria	X		X		X	X				X		5
Norway				X								1
Peru					X				X			2
Philippines	X	X	X	X	X							5
Poland	X	X	X	X	X	X	X	X	X	X	X	11
Puerto Rico			X	X	X	X			X	X		6
Romania		X	X	X	X	X	X	X		X	X	9
Sierra Leone											X	1
South Korea	X	X	X	X	X	X	X					7
Soviet Union	X	X	X	X	X	X	X	X	X	X	X	11
Spain			X	X	X	X	X	X				6
Sudan				X	X			X				3
Sweden			X	X			X					3
Tanzania									X			1
Thailand		X	X			X						3
Tunisia			X	X	X	X						4
Turkey	X	X		X	X	X	X					6
Uganda	X	X	X		X	X	X	X	X			8
United States	X	X	X	X	X	X	X	X	X	X	X	11
Uruguay					X	X		X	X			4
Venezuela	X	X			X	X						4
West Germany			X	X		X	X	X	X	X	X	8
Yugoslavia				X	X	X			X		X	5
Zambia	X	X	X				X					4
Total: 64 NOCs	24	25	39	32	37	35	33	27	22	18	16	308
