= Boxing at the 1967 Mediterranean Games =

Boxing competition

- Location: Tunis, Tunisia
- Dates: 8–14 September 1967

The boxing events of the 1967 Mediterranean Games were held in Tunis, Tunisia.

== Medalists ==
Event	Gold	Silver	Bronze
Flyweight (–51 kg)	Boujemaa Hilmann (MAR)	Jose Escudero (ESP)	Gaspare Milazzo (ITA) Engin Yadigar (TUR)
Bantamweight (–54 kg)	Giuseppe Mura (ITA)	Hikmet Demirbaryak (TUR)	Mahmoud Ladjili (TUN) Ramiro Suarez (ESP)
Featherweight (–57 kg)	Elio Cotena (ITA)	Seyfi Tatar (TUR)	Aquilino Guarido (ESP) Angelos Theotokatos (GRE)
Lightweight (–60 kg)	Zvonimir Vujin (YUG)	Yeter Sevimli (TUR)	Enzo Petriglia (ITA) Abderrahman Hattab (LBY)
Light Welterweight (–63.5 kg)	Luigi Piras (ITA)	Ljubinko Veselinović (YUG)	Mariano Perez (ESP) Fatah Ben Farj (MAR)
Welterweight (–67 kg)	Amar Boukhres (TUN)	Celal Sandal (TUR)	Abderrahman el-Ouabaoui (LBY) Jose Duran (ESP)
Light Middleweight (–71 kg)	Evangelos Oikonomakos (GRE)	Nicola Menchi (ITA)	Victor Varon (ESP) H. Chaabane (TUN)
Middleweight (–75 kg)	Mario Casati (ITA)	Lahcen Ahidous (MAR)	Khemais Aounallah (TUN) Nazif Kuran (TUR)
Light Heavyweight (–81 kg)	Armando Zanini (ITA)	Kilani Jaouadi (TUN)	Mahjoub Kanafi (MAR) Fernando Hernandez (ESP)
Heavyweight (+81 kg)	Giorgio Bambini (ITA)	Efstathios Alexopoulos (GRE)	Ramadi Lahbib (TUN) Omar Kaddour (ALG)

== Medal table ==
Rank	Nation	Gold	Silver	Bronze	Total
1	Italy (ITA)	6	1	2	9
2	Tunisia (TUN)	1	1	4	6
3	Morocco (MAR)	1	1	2	4
4	Greece (GRE)	1	1	1	3
5	Yugoslavia (YUG)	1	1	0	2
6	Turkey (TUR)	0	4	2	6
7	Spain (ESP)	0	1	6	7
8	Libya (LBY)	0	0	2	2
9	Algeria (ALG)	0	0	1	1
Totals (9 entries)		10	10	20	40
