= Boxing at the 1968 Summer Olympics – Bantamweight =

Boxing competitions

The Bantamweight class in the boxing competition was the third-lowest weight class. Bantamweights were limited to those boxers weighing a maximum of 54 kilograms (119.1 lbs). 39 boxers qualified for this category. Like all Olympic boxing events, the competition was a straight single-elimination tournament. Both semifinal losers were awarded bronze medals, so no boxers competed again after their first loss. Bouts consisted of six rounds each. Five judges scored each bout.

== Medalists ==
Gold	Valerian Sokolov; Soviet Union
Silver	Eridadi Mukwanga; Uganda
Bronze	Eiji Morioka; Japan
Bronze	Chang Kyou-chul; South Korea

== Schedule ==
Date	Round
Sunday, October 13, 1968	First round
Wednesday, October 16, 1968	Second round
Monday, October 21, 1968	Third round
Wednesday, October 23, 1968	Quarterfinals
Thursday, October 24, 1968	Semifinals
Saturday, October 26, 1968	Final Bout

== Draw ==
=== Finals ===
Semifinals		Final
Valerian Sokolov (URS)	5
Eiji Morioka (JPN)	0	Valerian Sokolov (URS)	RSC
Eridadi Mukwanga (UGA)	4	Eridadi Mukwanga (UGA)
Chang Kyou-chul (KOR)	1

=== Top half ===
First round

Second round
Valerian Sokolov (URS)	3
Rafael Archundia (ECU)	2
Michael Carter (GBR)	5
Jouko Lindbergh (FIN)	0
Samuel Mbugua (KEN)	5
Dhanraj Singh (GUY)	0
Giuseppe Mura (ITA)	5
Andrés Torres (PUR)	0
John Rakowski (AUS)	3
Angelos Theotokatos (GRE)	2
Mick Dowling (IRL)	RSC
Bernd Juterzenka (GDR)
Eiji Morioka (JPN)	4
Dominador Calumarde (PHI)	1
Aldo Cosentino (FRA)	5
Kjell Fredriksson (SWE)	0

Third round
Valerian Sokolov (URS)	RSC
Michael Carter (GBR)
Samuel Mbugua (KEN)	3
Giuseppe Mura (ITA)	2
John Rakowski (AUS)	DSQ
Mick Dowling (IRL)
Eiji Morioka (JPN)	4
Aldo Cosentino (FRA)	1

Quarterfinals
Valerian Sokolov (URS)	5
Samuel Mbugua (KEN)	0
Mick Dowling (IRL)	1
Eiji Morioka (JPN)	4

Semifinals
Valerian Sokolov (URS)	5
Eiji Morioka (JPN)	0

=== Bottom half ===
First round
Chang Kyou-chul (KOR)	5
Mario Mendoza (GUA)	0
Fermín Espinosa (CUB)	4
Cherdchai Udompaichitkul (THA)	1
Nikola Savov (BUL)	RSC
Godfrey Mwamba (ZAM)
Sulley Shittu (GHA)	4
Dary Dasuda (NIG)	1
Gyula Szabó (HUN)	3
Guillermo Velásquez (CHI)	2
Horst Rascher (FRG)	RSC
John Dadigi (NGR)
Kenneth Campbell (JAM)	5
Hermes Silva (NCA)	0

Second round
Nicolae Gîju (ROU)	5
Samuel Goss (USA)	0
Eridadi Mukwanga (UGA)	KO-2
Ramiro Suárez (ESP)
Roberto Cervantes (MEX)	5
Jan Gałązka (POL)	0
Domingo Casco (ARG)	3
Mahmoud Ladjili (TUN)	2
Wang Chee-Yen (TPE)	2
Chang Kyou-chul (KOR)	3
Fermín Espinosa (CUB)
Nikola Savov (BUL)	RSC
Sulley Shittu (GHA)	5
Gyula Szabó (HUN)	0
Horst Rascher (FRG)	4
Kenneth Campbell (JAM)	1

Third round
Nicolae Giju (ROU)
Eridadi Mukwanga (UGA)	RSC
Roberto Cervantes (MEX)
Domingo Casco (ARG)	DSQ
Chang Kyou-chul (KOR)	RSC
Nikola Savov (BUL)
Sulley Shittu (GHA)	2
Horst Rascher (FRG)	3

Quarterfinals
Eridadi Mukwanga (UGA)	4
Roberto Cervantes (MEX)	1
Chang Kyou-chul (KOR)	5
Horst Rascher (FRG)	0

Semifinals
Eridadi Mukwanga (UGA)	4
Chang Kyou-chul (KOR)	1
