= 1967 European Amateur Boxing Championships =

Boxing competitions

- Host city: Rome
- Country: Italy
- Nations: 26
- Athletes: 171
- Dates: 30 May–8 June

The 1967 European Amateur Boxing Championships were held in Rome, Italy from 25 May to 2 June. The 17th edition of the bi-annual competition was organised by the European governing body for amateur boxing, EABA. There were 171 fighters from 26 countries participating.

== Medal winners ==
Event	Gold	Silver	Bronze
Flyweight (– 51 kilograms)	Hubert Skrzypczak; Poland	Constantin Ciucă; Romania	Pyotr Gorbatov; Soviet Union Engin Yadigar; Turkey
Bantamweight (– 54 kilograms)	Nicolae Giju; Romania	Horst Rascher; West Germany	Bruno Pieracci; Italy Nikola Savov; Bulgaria
Featherweight (– 57 kilograms)	Ryszard Petek; Poland	Seyfi Tatar; Turkey	Jean-Louis de Souza; France Ivan Mihailov; Bulgaria
Lightweight (– 60 kilograms)	Józef Grudzień; Poland	(Socialist Federal Republic of Yugoslavia) Zvonimir Vujin; Yugoslavia	Dieter Dunkel; East Germany László Gula; Hungary
Light Welterweight (– 63.5 kilograms)	Valeriy Frolov; Soviet Union	Jerzy Kulej; Poland	János Kajdi; Hungary Peter Tiepold; East Germany
Welterweight (– 67 kilograms)	Bohumil Němeček; Czechoslovakia	Manfred Wolke; East Germany	István Gali; Hungary Ion Hodosan; Romania
Light Middleweight (– 71 kilograms)	Viktor Ageyev; Soviet Union	Witold Stachurski; Poland	Ion Covaci; Romania Vojtech Stantien; Czechoslovakia
Middleweight (– 75 kilograms)	Mario Casati; Italy	Aleksey Kiselyov; Soviet Union	Gheorghe Chivar; Romania Jan Hejduk; Czechoslovakia
Light Heavyweight (– 81 kilograms)	Danas Pozniakas; Soviet Union	Peter Gerber; West Germany	Ion Monea; Romania Cosimo Pinto; Italy
Heavyweight (+ 81 kilograms)	Mario Baruzzi; Italy	Peter Boddington; England	Kiril Pandov; Bulgaria Jürgen Schlegel; East Germany

== Medal table ==
* Host nation (Italy)

Rank	Nation	Gold	Silver	Bronze	Total
1	Poland (POL)	3	2	0	5
2	Soviet Union (URS)	3	1	1	5
3	Italy (ITA)*	2	0	2	4
4	Romania (ROU)	1	1	4	6
5	Czechoslovakia (TCH)	1	0	2	3
6	West Germany (FRG)	0	2	0	2
7	East Germany (GDR)	0	1	3	4
8	Turkey (TUR)	0	1	1	2
9	England (ENG)	0	1	0	1
9	Yugoslavia (YUG)	0	1	0	1
11	Bulgaria (BUL)	0	0	3	3
11	Hungary (HUN)	0	0	3	3
13	France (FRA)	0	0	1	1
Totals (13 entries)		10	10	20	40
