= Bernd Anders =

German boxer (born 1942)

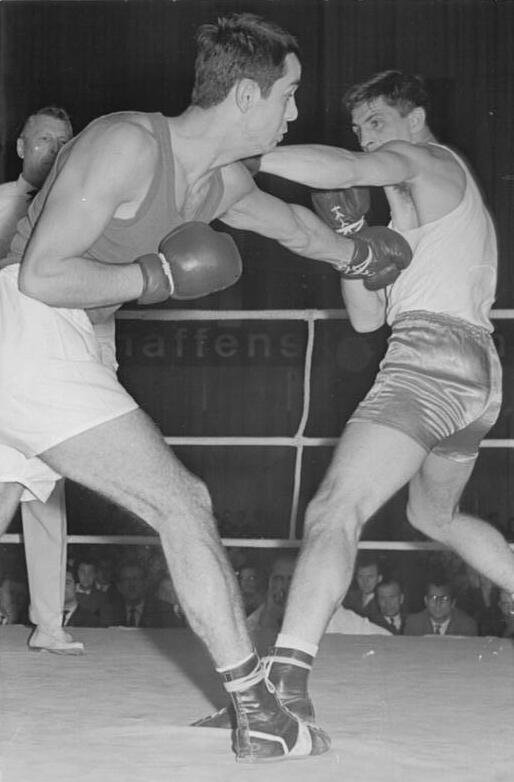
- Anders (left) in a match against Tadeusz Walasek in 1963

Personal information
- Nationality: German
- Born: 30 September 1942 (age 84) Berlin, Germany

Sport
- Sport: Boxing

Bernd Anders (born 30 September 1942) is a German boxer. He competed in the men's heavyweight event at the 1968 Summer Olympics.

== Boxing career ==
At the 1963 European Amateur Boxing Championships in Moscow, he was eliminated in the middleweight (–75 kg) quarterfinals after losing to Emil Schulz of West Germany. At the 1965 European Amateur Boxing Championships in Berlin, he won the bronze medal in the light heavyweight division (–81 kg) after two victories, losing in the semifinals to Peter Gerber of West Germany.

At the 1968 Summer Olympics in Mexico City, he competed in the heavyweight category (+81 kg). He defeated Nancio Carrillo of Cuba in the opening bout, but lost in the quarterfinals to Jonas Čepulis of the Soviet Union, who went on to win the silver medal.

In 1970, he won the heavyweight class at the Giraldo Córdoba Cardín Tournament in Havana, defeating Teófilo Stevenson in the final.

He was East German national champion in the middleweight division in 1963 and 1964, and in the heavyweight division in 1967 and 1968. He also won silver medals in the middleweight division in 1962 and in the heavyweight division in 1969 and 1970, and a bronze medal in the heavyweight division in 1972.
