= Boxing at the 1968 Summer Olympics – Light flyweight =

Boxing competitions

The Light Flyweight class in the boxing competition was the lightest class. Light flyweights were limited to those boxers weighing less than 48 kilograms (105.8 lbs). 24 boxers qualified for this category. It was the first appearance of this category in Olympic Boxing competitions.

Like all Olympic boxing events, the competition was a straight single-elimination tournament. Both semifinal losers were awarded bronze medals, so no boxers competed again after their first loss. Bouts consisted of three three-minute rounds each. Five judges scored each bout.

== Medalists ==
Gold	Francisco Rodríguez; Venezuela
Silver	Jee Yong-ju; South Korea
Bronze	Hubert Skrzypczak; Poland
Bronze	Harlan Marbley; United States

== Schedule ==
Date	Round
Sunday, 13 October 1968	First round
Friday, 18 October 1968	Second round
Sunday, 20 October 1968	Quarterfinals
Thursday, 24 October 1968	Semifinals
Saturday, 26 October 1968	Final Bout

== Draw ==
Round of 32
Tahar Aziz (MAR)	4
David Nata (ZAM)	1
Hubert Skrzypczak (POL)	5
Mohamed Selim Soheim (EGY)	0
Joseph Donovan (AUS)	RSC
György Gedó (HUN)
Roberto Urretavizcaya (ARG)	w/o
Ignacio Espinal (DOM)
Bernd Englmeier (GDR)	5
Manolo Vicera (PHI)	0
Alberto Morales (MEX)	3
Franco Udella (ITA)	2
Viktor Zaporozhets (URS)	5
Junji Watanabe (JPN)	0
Jee Yong-ju (KOR)	TKO-2
Douglas Ogada (UGA)

Round of 16
Gabriel Ogun (NGR)	4
Stefan Aleksandrov (BUL)	1
Harlan Marbley (USA)	5
Fuat Temel (TUR)	0
Hatha Karunaratne (CEY)	5
Thet U Lai (BIR)	0
Francisco Rodríguez (VEN)	5
Rafael Carbonell (CUB)	0
Tahar Aziz (MAR)	1
Hubert Skrzypczak (POL)	4
Joseph Donovan (AUS)	5
Robert Urretavizcaya (ARG)	0
Bernd Englmeier (GDR)
Alberto Morales (MEX)	RSC
Viktor Zaporozhets (URS)	2
Jee Yong-ju (KOR)	3

Quarterfinals
Gabriel Ogun (NGR)	0
Harlan Marbley (USA)	5
Hatha Karunaratne (CEY)
Francisco Rodríguez (VEN)	RSC
Joseph Donovan (AUS)	2
Hubert Skrzypczak (POL)	3
Alberto Morales (MEX)	2
Jee Yong-ju (KOR)	3

Semifinals
Harlan Marbley (USA)	1
Francisco Rodríguez (VEN)	4
Hubert Skrzypczak (POL)	1
Jee Yong-ju (KOR)	4

Final
Francisco Rodríguez (VEN)	3
Jee Yong-ju (KOR)	2
