= Francisco Rodríguez (boxer, born 1945) =

Venezuelan boxer (1945–2024)

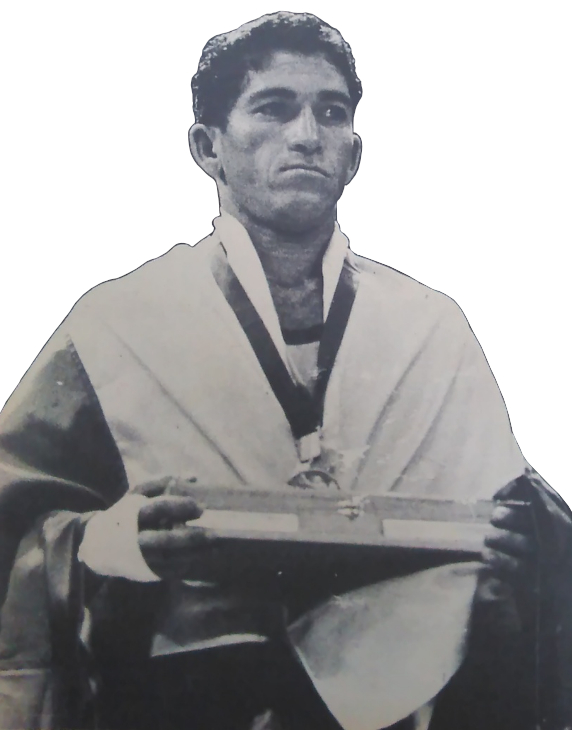
- Rodríguez in 1968

Personal information
- Full name: Francisco Antonio Rodríguez Brito
- Nickname: Morochito
- Born: 20 September 1945 Cumaná, Sucre, Venezuela
- Died: 23 April 2024 (aged 78)
- Height: 1.74 m (5 ft 9 in)
- Weight: 132 lb (60 kg)

Sport
- Sport: Boxing
- Weight class: Light flyweight, Flyweight
Medal record
Men's boxing
Representing Venezuela
Olympic Games
Gold medal – first place	1968 Mexico City	Light flyweight -48 kg
Pan American Games
Gold medal – first place	1967 Winnipeg	Flyweight -51 kg
Gold medal – first place	1971 Cali	Flyweight -51 kg
Central American and Caribbean Games
Gold medal – first place	1970 Panama	Light flyweight -48 kg
Bolivarian Games
Gold medal – first place	1970 Maracaibo	Light flyweight -48 kg

Francisco Antonio Rodríguez Brito (20 September 1945 – 23 April 2024) was a Venezuelan boxer. At the 1968 Summer Olympics in Mexico City he won the gold medal in the inaugural men's light flyweight (– 48 kg) division, in addition to claiming the gold at the 1967 and 1971 Pan American Games. He carried the flag for his native country at the opening ceremony at the 1972 Summer Olympics in Munich, West Germany. Rodríguez died on 23 April 2024, at the age of 78.

== Amateur career ==
Rodriguez, nicknamed "Morochito", was Venezuela's first Olympic gold medalist, winning gold in the light flyweight division in its inaugural year of competition, 1968. His amateur record stood at 266 wins, 4 losses.

After the Olympics, Rodríguez signed a professional contract. Before fighting he took his mother to a pro bout. At one point, one of the boxers' bloody mouthpieces landed in Rodriguez's mother's lap. She begged Rodriguez to give up fighting and he cancelled his contract.

== Olympic results ==
Mexico City – 1968

- Round of 32: bye
- Round of 16: Defeated Rafael Carbonell (Cuba) on points, 5–0
- Quarterfinal: Defeated Hatha Karunaratne (Ceylon) by a second-round TKO
- Semifinal: Defeated Harlan Marbley (United States) on points, 4–1
- Final: Defeated Jee Yong-Ju (South Korea) on points, 3-2 (won gold medal)

Munich – 1972

- Lost to Dennis Talbot (Australia) KO 2

== Honors ==
Rodríguez was inducted into the Venezuelan Sports Hall of Fame in 1988.
