= John Dadigi =

Nigerian boxer

Personal information
- Nationality: Nigerian
- Born: 9 September 1950 (age 74); Lagos, Nigeria

Sport
- Sport: Boxing

John Dadigi (born 9 September 1950) is a Nigerian boxer. He competed in the men's bantamweight event at the 1968 Summer Olympics. At the 1968 Summer Olympics, he lost to Horst Rascher of West Germany.
