= Bagayoyo =

Disambiguation

Bagayoyo is a surname. Notable people with this surname includes:

- Issa Bagayogo (1961–2016), Malian musician
- Mohammed Bagayogo (1523–1593), eminent scholar
- Soungalo Bagayogo (1941–2012), Malian boxer
- Siriman Bagayogo (born 1997), Canadian professional football defensive back
