= Jorge Clemente =

Jorge Clemente may refer to:

- Jorge Clemente (actor) (born 1993), Spanish actor
- Jorge Clemente (boxer) (born 1946), Puerto Rican boxer
