= South Korea at the 1968 Summer Olympics =

- IOC code: KOR (COR used at these Games)
- NOC: Korean Olympic Committee

in Mexico City
- Competitors: 54 (41 men, 13 women) in 11 sports
- Medals Ranked 36th: Gold 0 Silver 1 Bronze 1 Total 2

Summer Olympics appearances (overview)
- 1948; 1952; 1956; 1960; 1964; 1968; 1972; 1976; 1980; 1984; 1988; 1992; 1996; 2000; 2004; 2008; 2012; 2016; 2020; 2024; 2028

South Korea, as Korea, competed at the 1968 Summer Olympics in Mexico City, Mexico. It was the nation's sixth appearance at the Olympics, after debuting in 1948. 54 competitors, 41 men and 13 women, took part in 43 events in 11 sports.

== Medalists ==
Medal	Name	Sport	Event	Date
Silver	Jee Yong-ju	Boxing	Men's Light flyweight	26 October
Bronze	Chang Kyou-chul	Boxing	Men's Bantamweight	26 October

== Cycling ==
Two cyclists represented South Korea in 1968.

Individual road race

- Gwon Jung-hyeon

Sprint

- Kim Gwang-seon
- Gwon Jung-hyeon

1000m time trial

- Kim Gwang-seon

Individual pursuit

- Gwon Jung-hyeon

== Diving ==
Men

Athlete	Event	Preliminary		Final			
Athlete	Event	Points	Rank	Points	Rank	Total	Rank
Song Jae-ung	3 m springboard	79.66	22	Did not advance			
Song Jae-ung	10 m platform	77.30	31	Did not advance			

Women

Athlete	Event	Preliminary		Final			
Athlete	Event	Points	Rank	Points	Rank	Total	Rank
Park Jeong-ja	3 m springboard	73.53	21	Did not advance			
Park Jeong-ja	10 m platform	39.03	24	Did not advance			

== Shooting ==
Two shooters, both men, represented South Korea in 1968.

Open

Athlete	Event	Final	
Athlete	Event	Points	Rank
An Jae-song	50 m pistol	541	34
Kim Yong-bae	50 m pistol	532	45

== Swimming ==
Women

Athlete	Event	Heat		Semifinal		Final	
Athlete	Event	Time	Rank	Time	Rank	Time	Rank
Nam Sang-nam	100 m butterfly	1:16.9	27	Did not advance			
Nam Sang-nam	200 m butterfly	2:58.6	21	—N/a		Did not advance	

== Volleyball ==
=== Women's team competition ===
- Round Robin

- Lost to Poland (2-3)
- Lost to Peru (0-3)
- Lost to Soviet Union (0-3)
- Defeated United States (3-1)
- Defeated Mexico (3-0)
- Lost to Japan (0-3)
- Defeated Czechoslovakia (3-1) → Fifth place

- Team Roster
