= Jan Gałązka =

Polish boxer (1945–1982)

Personal information
- Nationality: Polish
- Born: 4 February 1945 Białystok, Poland
- Died: 7 January 1982 (aged 36) Białystok, Poland

Sport
- Sport: Boxing
Medal record
Men's amateur boxing
Representing Poland
European Amateur Championships
| Silver medal – second place | 1965 East Berlin | Bantamweight |

Jan Gałązka (4 January 1945 – 7 January 1982) was a Polish boxer. He competed in the men's bantamweight event at the 1968 Summer Olympics. At the 1968 Summer Olympics, he lost to Roberto Cervantes of Mexico.
