= Harlan Marbley =

American boxer (1943–2008)

Personal information
- Full name: Harlan Joseph Marbley
- Nickname: Peewee
- Born: October 11, 1943 White Oak, Maryland, U.S.
- Died: May 13, 2008 (aged 64) Clinton, Maryland, U.S.
- Height: 5 ft 4 in (1.62 m)
- Weight: 106 lb (48 kg)

Sport
- Sport: Boxing
- Weight class: Light flyweight, Flyweight
Medal record
Men's boxing
Representing the United States
Olympic Games
| Bronze medal – third place | 1968 Mexico City | Light flyweight -48 kg |
Pan American Games
| Bronze medal – third place | 1967 Winnipeg | Flyweight -51 kg |

Harlan Joseph Marbley (October 11, 1943 – May 13, 2008) was a flyweight boxer from the United States who represented his native country at the 1968 Summer Olympics in Mexico City, Mexico. There he won the bronze medal, after a loss in the semifinals of the men's light flyweight division against eventual gold medalist Francisco Rodríguez from Venezuela.

== Amateur career ==
Marbley won the 1968 National AAU Light flyweight championship.

== 1968 Olympic results ==
Below is the record of Harlan Marbley, an American light flyweight boxer who competed at the 1968 Mexico City Olympics:

- Round of 32: bye
- Round of 16 Defeated Fuat Temel (Turkey) on points, 5-0
- Quarterfinal: Defeated Gabriel Ogun (Nigeria) on points, 5-0
- Semifinal: Lost to Francisco Rodríguez (Venezuela) on points, 1-4 (was awarded bronze medal)
