= Dunkel (surname) =

Dunkel is a German surname, literally meaning "dark" or "confusing" in Middle High German; the word was used as a nickname for a person of darh hair or complexion, or someone who was difficult to understand. In some case the surname came from person's nicknae related to ho dwelling place in a dark area, such as in thick woods. Notable people with the surname include:

- Arthur Dunkel, (1932–2005), Swiss politician, Director-General of the World Trade Organization (1980–1993)
- Dieter Dunkel, German boxer
- Fred Dunkel (1891–1948), German journalist, businessman, and filmmaker
- Harry F. Dunkel (1898–1990), American lawyer and politician
- John Dunkel (1915–2001), American screenwriter
- Nancy Dunkel (born 1955), American politician
- Paul Lustig Dunkel (1943–2018), American flutist and conductor
- William Dunkel (1893–1980), American-born Swiss architect and painter

== See also ==
- Tunkel
- Dünkel
