= Dünkel =

Dunkel is a German surname, coming from a hickname literally meaning "snobbish", "self-righteous" in Middle Low German. Notable people with the surname include:

- Frieder Dünkel (born 1950), German criminal lawyer and criminologist
- Norbert Dünkel (born 1961), German politician (CSU)
- Uwe Dünkel (born 1960), German Olympic racewalker

== See also ==
- Tunkel
- Dunkel
