= Walter Facchinetti =

Italian boxer (born 1947)

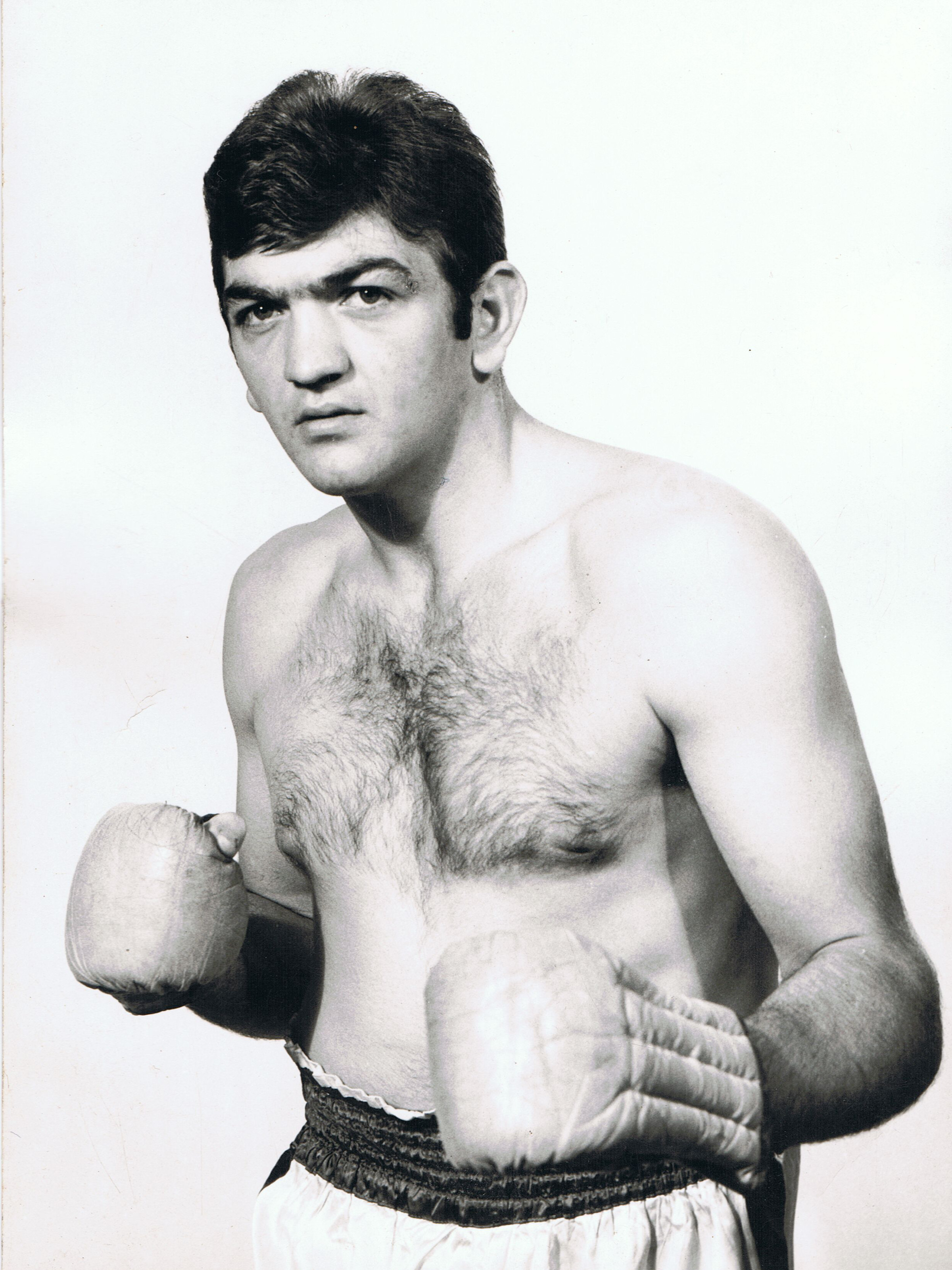
- Walter Facchinetti in 1968

Personal information
- Nationality: Italian
- Born: 29 March 1947 (age 78); Arcisate, Italy

Sport
- Sport: Boxing

Walter Facchinetti (born 29 March 1947) is an Italian boxer.

== Career ==
He competed in the men's light heavyweight event at the 1968 Summer Olympics. At the 1968 Summer Olympics, he defeated Josef Kapín of Czechoslovakia, before losing to Kurt Baumgartner of Austria.
