= Arthur Redden =

American boxer (born 1936)

Art Redden
Personal information
- Full name: Arthur Gray Redden
- Born: June 19, 1936 (age 90) Wilmington, Delaware, U.S.
- Height: 5 ft 10 in (178 cm)
- Weight: 179 lb (81 kg)

Sport
- Sport: Boxing
- Weight class: Light heavyweight (-81 kg)
Medal record
Men's boxing
Representing the United States
Pan American Games
Gold medal – first place	1967 Winnipeg	Light heavyweight

Arthur Gray Redden (born June 19, 1936) is an American boxer. A U.S. Marine, he competed in the men's light heavyweight event at the 1968 Summer Olympics. At the 1968 Summer Olympics, he lost to Georgi Stankov of Bulgaria. Previously he played football and was a track and field athlete at Arkansas AM & N.

He was a contestant on a 1971 episode of the syndicated version of Hollywood Squares.

In 1994, he was inducted into the Delaware Sports Hall of Fame.
