= Thet U Lai =

Burmese boxer

Personal information
- Nationality: Burmese
- Born: 10 May 1947 (age 77); Bassein, British Burma

Sport
- Sport: Boxing

Thet U Lai (born 10 May 1947) is a Burmese boxer. He competed in the men's light flyweight event at the 1968 Summer Olympics. At the 1968 Summer Olympics, he lost to Hatha Karunaratne of Sri Lanka.
