= Raymar =

Raymar is a given name. Notable people with the name include:

- Raymar Jose (born 1992), Filipino basketball player
- Raymar Morgan (born 1988), American basketball player
- Raymar Reimers (born 1940), German boxer
