= Boxing at the 1968 Summer Olympics – Heavyweight =

Boxing competitions

The Heavyweight class in the boxing competition was the highest weight class. Heavyweights were limited to those boxers weighing a minimum of 81 kilograms (178.6 lbs). 16 boxers qualified for this category. Like all Olympic boxing events, the competition was a straight single-elimination tournament. Both semifinal losers were awarded bronze medals, so no boxers competed again after their first loss. Bouts consisted of six rounds each. Five judges scored each bout.

== Medalists ==
Gold	George Foreman; United States
Silver	Jonas Čepulis; Soviet Union
Bronze	Giorgio Bambini; Italy
Bronze	Joaquín Rocha; Mexico

== Schedule ==
Date	Round
Wednesday, October 16, 1968	First round
Tuesday, October 22, 1968	Quarterfinals
Thursday, October 24, 1968	Semifinals
Saturday, October 26, 1968	Final Bout

== Draw ==
First round
George Foreman (USA)	4
Lucjan Trela (POL)	1
Ion Alexe (ROU)	5
John Coker (SLE)	0
Kiril Pandov (BUL)	3
Petar Miloš (YUG)	2
Giorgio Bambini (ITA)	5
Dieter Renz (FRG)	0
Rudie Lubbers (NED)	5
Talaat Dahshan (EGY)	0
Joaquín Rocha (MEX)	4
Adonis Ray (GHA)	1
Bernd Anders (GDR)	RSC
Nancio Carrillo (CUB)
Jonas Čepulis (URS)	RSC
William Wells (GBR)

Quarterfinals
George Foreman (USA)	RSC
Ion Alexe (ROU)
Kiril Pandov (BUL)	0
Giorgio Bambini (ITA)	5
Rudie Lubbers (NED)	2
Joaquín Rocha (MEX)	3
Bernd Anders (GDR)
Jonas Čepulis (URS)	RSC

Semifinals
George Foreman (USA)	KO-2
Giorgio Bambini (ITA)
Joaquín Rocha (MEX)
Jonas Čepulis (URS)	RSC

Final
George Foreman (USA)	RSC
Jonas Čepulis (URS)
