= Junji Watanabe =

Japanese boxer

Personal information
- Nationality: Japanese
- Born: 12 April 1944 (age 80); Akita, Japan

Sport
- Sport: Boxing

Junji Watanabe (渡部 惇二, Watanabe Junji, born 12 April 1944) is a Japanese boxer. He competed in the men's light flyweight event at the 1968 Summer Olympics. At the 1968 Summer Olympics, he lost to Viktor Zaporozhets of the Soviet Union.
