= Joseph Donovan =

Joseph Donovan may refer to:

- Joseph Donovan (producer), music producer, engineer, and musician
- Joseph Donovan (boxer) (1949–2001), indigenous Australian boxer
- Joseph L. Donovan (1893–1985), Minnesota politician
- Joseph R. Donovan Jr., American diplomat
- Joseph S. Donovan (1800–1861), American slave trader
