= Stefan Aleksandrov =

Bulgarian boxer

Personal information
- Nationality: Bulgarian
- Born: 4 November 1946 (age 78); Plovdiv, Bulgaria

Sport
- Sport: Boxing

Stefan Aleksandrov (born 4 November 1946) is a Bulgarian boxer. He competed in the men's light flyweight event at the 1968 Summer Olympics. At the 1968 Summer Olympics, he lost to Gabriel Ogun of Nigeria.
