= Kurt Baumgartner =

Austrian boxer

Personal information
- Nationality: Austrian
- Born: 29 March 1943 (age 81); Klein Göpfritz, Nazi Germany

Sport
- Sport: Boxing

Kurt Baumgartner (born 29 March 1943) is an Austrian boxer. He competed in the men's light heavyweight event at the 1968 Summer Olympics. At the 1968 Summer Olympics, he defeated Soungalo Bagayogo of Mali, before losing to Walter Facchinetti of Italy.
