= Petar Miloš =

Croatian boxer

Personal information
- Nationality: Croatian
- Born: 11 April 1941 (age 83); Drniš, Yugoslavia

Sport
- Sport: Boxing

Petar Miloš (born 11 April 1941) is a Croatian boxer. He competed in the men's heavyweight event at the 1968 Summer Olympics. At the 1968 Summer Olympics, he lost to Kiril Pandov of Bulgaria.
