= Rafael Anchundia =

Ecuadorian boxer (born 1946)

Personal information
- Born: 12 May 1946 (age 79); Guayaquil, Ecuador

Sport
- Sport: Boxing

Rafael Anchundia (born 12 May 1946) is an Ecuadorian boxer. He competed in the men's bantamweight event at the 1968 Summer Olympics. At the 1968 Summer Olympics in Mexico City, he received a bye in the Round of 64 but Anchundia then lost to Valerian Sokolov of the Soviet Union by decision in the Round of 32.
