= Andrés Torres =

Andrés Torres may refer to:

- Andrés Torres (baseball) (born 1978, American baseball center fielder
- Andrés Torres (cyclist) (born 1966), Guatemalan cyclist
- Andrés Torres (boxer) (born 1948), Puerto Rican boxer
- Andrés Torres (producer) (born 1987), Colombian record producer and drummer
- Andrés Torres Queiruga (born 1940), Galician theologian, writer and translator
- Andrés Felipe Torres (born 1975), Colombian sports shooter
