= Tahar Aziz =

Moroccan boxer

Personal information
- Nationality: Moroccan
- Born: 19 November 1950 (age 74); Casablanca, Morocco

Sport
- Sport: Boxing

Tahar Aziz (born 19 November 1950) is a Moroccan boxer. He competed in the men's light flyweight event at the 1968 Summer Olympics. At the 1968 Summer Olympics, he defeated David Nata of Zambia, before losing to Hubert Skrzypczak of Poland.
