= Boxing at the 1968 Summer Olympics – Light heavyweight =

Boxing competitions

The Light heavyweight class in the boxing competition was the second-highest weight class. Light heavyweights were limited to those boxers weighing a maximum of 81 kilograms (178.6 lbs). 18 boxers qualified for this category. Like all Olympic boxing events, the competition was a straight single-elimination tournament. Both semifinal losers were awarded bronze medals, so no boxers competed again after their first loss. Bouts consisted of six rounds each. Five judges scored each bout.

== Medalists ==
Gold	Danas Pozniakas; Soviet Union
Silver	Ion Monea; Romania
Bronze	Georgi Stankov; Bulgaria
Bronze	Stanisław Dragan; Poland

== Schedule ==
Date	Round
Sunday, October 13, 1968	First round
Friday, October 18, 1968	Second round
Tuesday, October 22, 1968	Quarterfinals
Thursday, October 24, 1968	Semifinals
Saturday, October 26, 1968	Final Bout

== Draw ==
First round
Kurt Baumgartner (AUT)	3
Soungalo Bagayogo (MLI)	2
Walter Facchinetti (ITA)	5
Josef Kapín (TCH)	0

Second round
Georgi Stankov (BUL)	4
Arthur Redden (USA)	1
Bernard Malherbe (FRA)	4
Efstathios Alexopoulos (GRE)	1
Danas Pozniakas (URS)	KO-2
Gregorio Aldama (CUB)
Jürgen Schlegel (GDR)	4
Hassan Nour-el-Din Aman (EGY)	1
Ion Monea (ROU)	5
Raymar Reimers (FRG)	0
Fatai Ayinla (NGR)	RSC
Enrique Villarreal (MEX)
Stanisław Dragan (POL)	DSQ
Jorge Clemente (PUR)
Kurt Baumgartner (AUT)	DSQ
Walter Facchinetti (ITA)

Quarterfinals
Georgi Stankov (BUL)	5
Bernard Malherbe (FRA)	0
Danas Pozniakas (URS)	5
Jürgen Schlegel (GDR)	0
Ion Monea (ROU)	3
Fatai Ayinla (NGR)	2
Stanisław Dragan (POL)	4
Walter Facchinetti (ITA)	1

Semifinals
Georgi Stankov (BUL)	0
Danas Pozniakas (URS)	5
Ion Monea (ROU)	4
Stanisław Dragan (POL)	1

Final
Danas Pozniakas (URS)	w/o
Ion Monea (ROU)
