= Douglas Ogada =

Ugandan boxer

Personal information
- Nationality: Ugandan
- Born: 11 November 1948 (age 76); Busia, Uganda

Sport
- Sport: Boxing

Douglas Ogada (born 11 November 1948) is a Ugandan boxer. He competed in the men's light flyweight event at the 1968 Summer Olympics. At the 1968 Summer Olympics, he lost to Jee Yong-ju of South Korea.
