= Henry Mugwanya =

Ugandan boxer

Personal information
- Nationality: Ugandan
- Born: 10 August 1943 (age 81)

Sport
- Sport: Boxing

Henry Mugwanya (born 10 August 1943) is a Ugandan boxer. He competed in the men's light heavyweight event at the 1964 Summer Olympics. At the 1964 Summer Olympics, he lost to Jürgen Schlegel of the United Team of Germany.
