= Igor Vysotsky =

Soviet boxer (1953–2023)

Personal information
- Native name: Игорь Яковлевич Высоцкий
- Nationality: Russian
- Born: Igor Yakovlevich Vysotsky; 10 September 1953 Yagodnoye, Khabarovsk Krai, Russian SFSR, Soviet Union
- Died: 2 April 2023 (aged 69)
- Height: 5 ft 11 in (180 cm)
- Weight: 202 lb (92 kg)

Sport
- Sport: Boxing
- Weight class: Heavyweight
- Club: Trud Sports Club
Medal record
Men's Boxing
Soviet Boxing Championships
Representing the Trud Sports Club
Bronze medal – third place	1974 Izhevsk	Heavyweight
Bronze medal – third place	1977 Frunze	Heavyweight
Gold medal – first place	1978 Tbilisi	Heavyweight
Bronze medal – third place	1979 Moscow	Heavyweight
Representing the Soviet Union
Córdova Cardín
Gold medal – first place	1973 Santiago	Heavyweight

Igor Yakovlevich Vysotsky (10 September 1953 – 2 April 2023) was a Soviet amateur boxer who competed from 1973 to 1979, best known for twice defeating the triple Olympic Champion Teófilo Stevenson, being the only boxer out of more than two hundred of Stevenson's opponents to ever knock him out, though he himself never participated in the Olympics. Vysotsky was the Soviet Heavyweight Champion in 1978, ranked the #1 Soviet heavyweight of the late 1970s from the American standpoint, and had an amateur record of 161–24. Representing the Trud Sports Club, Vysotsky was known and widely recognized for his aggressive style, punching power, stamina, and durable chin, having 24 losses in his record he had never experienced any other than standing defeat (with the exception of being dropped by Woody Clark of the USA in a US vs USSR Duals match, Vysotsky was not knocked down in his entire career). While apart from 1978 he never stepped up to semi-finals at the national championships, being constantly outpointed by technically skilled opponents, his unorthodox style and mentioned strengths counted, for he always was chosen to compete versus U.S. heavyweights in the USA–USSR match-ups, presenting a considerable level of opposition when it came to trading punches.

== Early years ==
Igor Vysotsky was born to a family of exile settlers. His father Yakov Antonovich Vysotsky, a Soviet Jew, also an amateur boxer, was a Soviet Naval Infantryman, serving with the Red Navy, fought the Germans during the World War II, after being severely wounded he was taken a prisoner of war. It was rumored that while being stationed at a POW camp, he was used as a human-dummy sparring partner for the German Heavyweight Champion Max Schmeling. He tried to escape several times, his ninth escape attempt was successful, however, Yakov Vysotsky was moved to a Soviet filtration camp, and then to the Far Eastern part of the USSR, to a GULAG camp at Kolyma, where he met Meeta Joganovna Suve, an exiled Estonian woman, whom he married, and she became mother of Igor Vysotsky. From the age of six, Igor had been trained daily by Yakov Antonovich, who became a mentor for his son. Igor Vysotsky went to a gym at 12 years old, weighing 163 lbs. He lost at his debut at the 1966 Magadan city championship.

Vysotsky graduated from the Magadan Teachers Training Institute, where he studied to become a PE teacher.

== Boxing career ==
"He have [sic] short arms, and he hits real hard."

— Muhammad Ali on Vysotsky.

The first nation-wide boxing event for Igor Vysotsky was a matchup in Alma-Ata in 1971. In 1972 he won silver at the Soviet Youth Boxing Tournament in Moscow. In 1973 he entered his first international boxing event.

Vysotsky's first bout with Stevenson was in July 1973, he defeated the Cuban boxer in a 3–2 decision. Their second and final meeting was in April 1976. Vysotsky stopped Stevenson in the third round.

Shortly before the 1976 Montreal Olympics, Vysotsky was badly cut in a sparring session, which prevented his participation in the Olympics (bloody cuts were a chief problem for Vysotsky throughout his career due to the anatomic features of his massive brow ridges, resulting in a number of referee-stopped contests). The Cubans didn't know about the injury and sent two heavyweights to Montreal, Stevenson and Ángel Milián Rivero. Had Vysotskiy participated, Stevenson would have been sitting on the alternate's bench.

In 1976, he stopped future WBA Heavyweight Champion Tony Tubbs in two rounds. The following year, he fought another future WBA Heavyweight Champion, Greg Page, losing by a split decision. Both bouts were in Las Vegas, Nevada and were part of a series of matches between the American and Soviet teams.

His prime years were in the mid-1970s, by November 1975 Vysotsky has won 98 amateur fights against just 13 losses. All of his losses by that time have been against other Soviet fighters, he said. Curiosity of the situation in 1975, when he became the top-ranked heavyweight amateur boxer in the world acclaimed by AIBA, highly touted by the Western press, the signs in front of the Madison Square Garden all hailed his coming to the United States, but oddly enough, the Soviet boxing authorities named the #1 heavyweight boxer in the USSR Yevgeniy Gorstkov, who has met Vysotsky once and stopped him on cuts. Gorstkov modestly said his victory over Vysotsky was luck. "Anybody can win any given fight. This time, I just had the luck." And as Vysotsky never has been knocked down, but the Russians admit he has a tendency to cut. Both his eyes are surrounded by scar tissue, which some have suggested should be removed by surgery. But Gorstkov, a 25-year-old veteran with a 120–17 record in an eight-year career, is relatively unmarked. "Everybody has a different opinion about how to fight Vysotsky. But you have to see him to really know how to fight him," Gorstkov said.

In June 1978, Muhammad Ali went on a ten-day to the Soviet Union. While there, he exhibited several rounds vis-à-vis Vysotsky. While watching the bout in retrospect Ali told Howard Cosell: "He hits real hard."

Vysotsky's last fight was at the 1980 National Championships. He lost to Yevgeniy Gorstkov again due to a cut. After retirement Vysotsky worked as a coach and sport functionary, particularly as vice-president of the Boxing Federation of Moscow Oblast.

After his retirement from competition, he established Yakov Vysotskiy Memorial annual open boxing memorial (to commemorate his father) at his hometown of Yagodnoye.

== Highlights ==
Notable bouts include:

Usov Memorial Tournament (+81 kg), Minsk, Belarus SSR, October 1971:

- 1/4: Lost to Anghel Iancu (Romania) by decision

(gold) VI Giraldo Córdova Cardín Tournament (+81 kg), Santiago de Cuba, Cuba, July 1973:

- 1/2: Defeated José Luis Cabrera (Cuba) by decision
- Finals: Defeated Teófilo Stevenson (Cuba) by split decision, 3–2

(silver) Black Diamonds Tournament (+81 kg), Katowice, Poland, June 1974:

- Finals: Lost to Andrzej Biegalski (Poland) RSCI 2 (Vysotsky badly cut in the 1st)

(gold) Dutch Open (+81 kg), Amsterdam, Netherlands, October 1974:

- 1/4: Defeated Georgi Stoimenov (Bulgaria) KO 2
- 1/2: Defeated Lolle Van Houten (Netherlands) RET 1
- Finals: Defeated Felipe Rodríguez Piñeiro (Spain) by walkover

(gold) Usov Memorial Tournament (+81 kg), Minsk, Belarus SSR, April 1976:

- Finals: Defeated Teófilo Stevenson (Cuba) KO 3

(silver) Golden Belt Tournament (+81 kg), Bucharest, Romania, April 1977:

- 1/4: Defeated Nicolae Grigore (Romania) RET 3
- 1/2 : Defeated Ángel Milián Rivero (Cuba) by decision
- Finals: Lost to Mircea Șimon (Romania) by walkover

X Giraldo Córdova Cardín Tournament (+81 kg), Matanzas, Cuba, July 1977:

- Lost to Ángel Milián Rivero (Cuba) by decision

(gold) Vaclav Prochazka Tournament (+81 kg), Ostrava, Czechoslovakia, September 1977:

- Finals: Defeated Dietmar Mayer (East Germany) by split decision, 3–2

World Championships (+81 kg), Belgrade, Yugoslavia, May 1978:

- 1/8: Lost to Dominique Nato (France) by split decision, 2–3

(silver) International Tournament (+91 kg), Alma-Ata, Kazakh SSR, March 1979:

- Finals: Lost to Ángel Milián Rivero (Cuba) by decision

XII Giraldo Córdova Cardín Tournament (+81 kg), Havana, Cuba, May 1979:

- Lost to Ángel Milián Rivero (Cuba) by decision

=== USA–USSR Duels ===
External videos
- Vysotsky vs. Teófilo Stevenson (1973)
- Vysotsky vs. Helton Willis (1975)
- Vysotsky vs. Muhammad Ali (1978)

- 17 May 1974, Kislovodsk, RSFSR: Defeated Clifford Stevens KO 1
- 22 January 1975, Caesars Tahoe, Lake Tahoe, Nevada: Defeated Emory Chapman RSC 3
- 28 January 1975, Felt Forum, New York City: Defeated Helton Willis KO 1 (0:25)
- 15 November 1975, Madison Square Garden, New York City: Lost to Jimmy Clark (41–5, 16 KOs) RSC 3 (Clark was knocked down in the 1st rd; by the 3rd, Vysotsky was badly cut, leading referee Vladimir Yengibaryan to stop the bout)
- 27 November 1976, Sahara Hotel Space Center, Las Vegas, Nevada: Defeated Tony Tubbs RSC 2
- 3 December 1976, Madison Square Garden, New York City: Defeated Jimmy Clark (60–5) RSC 3
- 29 January 1977, Las Vegas, Nevada: Defeated Jimmy Clark PTS
- 5 February 1977, Milwaukee, Wisconsin: Defeated Woody Clark KO 2
- 10 December 1977, Hilton Pavilion, Las Vegas, Nevada: Lost to Greg Page by split decision, 1–2 (Soviet Judge Boris Granatkin voted for Vysotsky 59–68. American judges Loring Baker and Jerry Dusenberry both had Page ahead)
- December 1977, Superdome, New Orleans, Louisiana: Defeated Charles Garrett PTS
- 31 March 1978, Alma-Ata, Kazakh SSR: Defeated Mitch Green (40–1) PTS

Vysotsky won eight out of his first ten bouts with American boxers, six of them by knockout.

Vysotsky said his most difficult opponents were Ángel Milián Rivero, whom he fought several times winning once, and Yevgeniy Gorstkov. After Cubans found out that Rivero posed a real challenge for Vysotsky, they brought him up to every event where Soviets sent or could have sent Vysotsky. Interestingly, Rivero himself met Stevenson ten times at various national match-ups, winning just one of them by walkover, scoring four draws, and losing five times, twice by knockout.

=== Rivalry with Stevenson ===
Teófilo Stevenson was known for two fights with Vysotsky, who defeated Stevenson twice. Vysotsky later revealed in his interview to East Side Boxing:

I fought Teofilo twice. We first met at the "Córdova Cardín" tournament in 1973 in Cuba. I took the first two opponents, both being Cuban, out early. In the third, I beat Stevenson on points. Although the score was 3:2, the pace of the fight forced Teofilo to take two necessary breaks to retie his gloves. We had a saying in the USSR, "It’s easier to win the World championships than it is to win 'Córdova Cardín'.” The second time was at a class A International tournament in Minsk, in March 1976. In each stanza, Stevenson took a count, while in the final three minutes, I knocked him out.

— Igor Vysotsky, Interview with East Side Boxing, 2006

Vysotsky employed evasive infighting tactics during his standoffs versus Stevenson, by cutting distance and constantly ducking under Stevenson's left hand, thus escaping from his devastating jabs and straight punches, and then driving upwards, getting him with short, effective hooks. Jimmy Clark, an American heavyweight from West Chester, Pa., who once defeated Vysotsky, challenged Stevenson three times in 1978 in 1980, said: "If Vysotsky can do it, so can I," but did not succeed.

== Exhibition boxing record ==
1 fight	0 wins	0 losses
Non-scored	1	

No.	Result	Record	Opponent	Type	Round, time	Date	Location	Notes
1	—N/a	0–0 (1)	(United States) Muhammad Ali	—N/a	2	20 June 1978	(Soviet Union) Moscow, RSFSR, U.S.S.R.	Non-scored bout

== Links ==
- Amateur career of Igor Vysotsky (in Spanish) compiled by Pedro Cabrera Isidron of the Cuban Olympics Committee. Last updated: 13 August 2006
- Amateur Boxing Results

Sporting positions
Preceded by Yevgeniy Gorstkov	Soviet Heavyweight Champion; 1978	Succeeded by Khoren Indjian
