= Dhanraj Singh (boxer) =

Guyanese boxer

Dhanraj Singh (born August 26, 1947, in Georgetown, British Guiana), is a retired Guyanese bantamweight boxer, who represented his country at the 1968 Summer Olympics. There he was eliminated in his opening bout of the men's bantamweight division by Samuel Mbugua of Kenya by a 0-5 decision.
