= Godfrey Mwamba =

Zambian boxer (born 1950)

Personal information
- Nationality: Zambian
- Born: 26 March 1950 (age 75); Kitwe, Zambia

Sport
- Sport: Boxing

Godfrey Mwamba (born 26 March 1950) is a Zambian boxer. He competed in the men's bantamweight event at the 1968 Summer Olympics.
