= Jorge Clemente (boxer) =

Puerto Rican boxer

Personal information
- Nationality: Puerto Rican
- Born: 24 March 1946 (age 79); Carolina, Puerto Rico

Sport
- Sport: Boxing

Jorge Clemente (born 24 March 1946) is a Puerto Rican boxer. He competed in the men's light heavyweight event at the 1968 Summer Olympics. At the 1968 Summer Olympics, he lost to Stanisław Dragan of Poland.
