= Enrique Villarreal =

Mexican boxer (born 1947)

Personal information
- Born: 17 April 1947 (age 77); Coahuila, Mexico

Sport
- Sport: Boxing

Enrique Villarreal (born 17 April 1947) is a Mexican boxer. He competed in the men's light heavyweight event at the 1968 Summer Olympics.

== 1968 Olympic results ==
Below are the results of Enrique Villareal, a Mexican light heavyweight boxer who competed at the 1968 Mexico City Olympics:

- Round of 32: bye
- Round of 16: lost to Fatai Ayinla (Nigeria) referee stopped contest
