= Fuat Temel =

Turkish boxer

Personal information
- Nationality: Turkish
- Born: 1 March 1951 (age 74); Mersin, Turkey

Sport
- Sport: Boxing

Fuat Temel (born 1 March 1951) is a Turkish boxer. He competed in the men's light flyweight event at the 1968 Summer Olympics. At the 1968 Summer Olympics, he lost to Harlan Marbley of the United States.
