= Guillermo Velásquez =

Chilean boxer (born 1944)

Personal information
- Born: 10 December 1944 (age 80); Osorno, Chile

Sport
- Sport: Boxing

Guillermo Velásquez (born 10 December 1944) is a Chilean boxer. He competed in the men's bantamweight event at the 1968 Summer Olympics.
