= Mario Casati =

Italian boxer (born 1944)

Personal information
- Nationality: Italian
- Born: 3 September 1944 (age 81) Carate Brianza, Italy

Sport
- Sport: Boxing
Medal record
Men's boxing
Representing Italy
European Amateur Championships
Bronze medal – third place	1965 East Berlin	Light Middleweight
Gold medal – first place	1967 Rome	Middleweight
Mediterranean Games
Gold medal – first place	1967 Tunis	Middleweight

Mario Casati (born 3 September 1944) is an Italian boxer. He competed in the men's middleweight event at the 1968 Summer Olympics.
