= Talaat Dahshan =

Egyptian boxer

Personal information
- Nationality: Egyptian
- Born: 7 June 1943; Cairo, Egypt
- Died: 23 December 2024 (aged 81)

Sport
- Sport: Boxing

Talaat Dahshan (7 June 1943 – 23 December 2024) was an Egyptian boxer. He competed in the men's heavyweight event at the 1968 Summer Olympics.
