= Bernd Juterzenka =

German boxer

Personal information
- Nationality: German
- Born: 5 February 1945 (age 80); Neuruppin, Germany

Sport
- Sport: Boxing

Bernd Juterzenka (born 5 February 1945) is a German boxer. He competed in the men's bantamweight event at the 1968 Summer Olympics.
