= Gregorio Aldama =

Cuban boxer (born 1938)

Personal information
- Born: 12 March 1938 (age 88) Matanzas, Cuba

Sport
- Sport: Boxing

Gregorio Aldama (born 12 March 1938) is a Cuban boxer. He competed in the men's light heavyweight event at the 1968 Summer Olympics.
