= Mario Mendoza (boxer) =

Guatemalan boxer

Personal information
- Full name: Mario Roberto Mendoza Zarceno
- Born: 7 July 1938 (age 88) Guatemala City, Guatemala

Sport
- Sport: Boxing

Mario Roberto Mendoza Zarceno (Note: In this Hispanic American name, the first or paternal surname is Mendoza and the second or maternal family name is Zarceno.) (born 7 July 1938) is a Guatemalan boxer. He competed in the men's bantamweight event at the 1968 Summer Olympics. At the 1968 Summer Olympics, he lost to Chang Kyou-chul of South Korea.
