= Gyula Szabó (boxer) =

Hungarian boxer (1943–2023)

Personal information
- Nationality: Hungarian
- Born: 29 December 1943; Budapest, Hungary
- Died: 16 December 2023 (aged 79)

Sport
- Sport: Boxing

Gyula Szabó (29 December 1943 – 16 December 2023) was a Hungarian boxer. He competed in the men's bantamweight event at the 1968 Summer Olympics. He died on 16 December 2023, at the age of 79.
