= Raymar Reimers =

German boxer

Personal information
- Nationality: German
- Born: 10 December 1940 (age 85) Reinbek, Germany

Sport
- Sport: Boxing

Raymar Reimers (born 10 December 1940) is a German boxer. He competed in the men's light heavyweight event at the 1968 Summer Olympics. At the 1968 Summer Olympics, he lost to Ion Monea of Romania.
