= Roberto Urretavizcaya =

Argentine boxer

Personal information
- Born: 22 August 1948 (age 76); Ciudadela, Argentina

Sport
- Sport: Boxing

Roberto Urretavizcaya (born 22 August 1948) is an Argentine boxer. He competed in the men's light flyweight event at the 1968 Summer Olympics.
