= Dieter Renz =

German boxer

Personal information
- Nationality: German
- Born: 3 March 1943; Bottrop, Germany
- Died: 10 August 1969 (aged 26); Sankt Moritz, Switzerland

Sport
- Sport: Boxing

Dieter Renz (3 March 1943 – 10 August 1969) was a German boxer. He competed in the men's heavyweight event at the 1968 Summer Olympics.
