= Petr Sommer (boxer) =

Czech boxer and boxing coach (1947–2025)

Personal information
- Nationality: Czechoslovakia; Czech Republic
- Born: 3 March 1947 Czechoslovakia
- Died: 20 August 2025 (aged 78)

Boxing career

Petr Sommer (3 March 1947 – 20 August 2025) was a Czech boxer and boxing coach. He competed at the 1971, 1973 and 1975 European Amateur Boxing Championships.

Sommer died on 20 August 2025, at the age of 78.
