= Hermes Silva =

Nicaraguan boxer

Personal information
- Born: 14 October 1950 (age 74); Siuna, Nicaragua

Sport
- Sport: Boxing

Hermes Silva (born 14 October 1950) is a Nicaraguan boxer. He competed in the men's bantamweight event at the 1968 Summer Olympics. At the 1968 Summer Olympics, he lost to Kenneth Campbell of Jamaica.
