= Andrés Torres (boxer) =

Puerto Rican boxer

Personal information
- Nationality: Puerto Rican
- Born: 3 May 1948 (age 76); Corozal, Puerto Rico

Sport
- Sport: Boxing

Andrés Torres (born 3 May 1948) is a Puerto Rican boxer. He competed in the men's bantamweight event at the 1968 Summer Olympics. At the 1968 Summer Olympics, he lost to Giuseppe Mura of Italy.
