= Efstathios Alexopoulos =

Greek boxer (born 1946)

Personal information
- Nationality: Greek
- Born: 1946 (age 78–79); Athens, Greece

Sport
- Sport: Boxing

Efstathios Alexopoulos (born 1946) is a Greek boxer. He competed in the men's light heavyweight event at the 1968 Summer Olympics. At the 1968 Summer Olympics, he lost to Bernard Malherbe of France.
