= Kjell Fredriksson =

Swedish boxer

Personal information
- Nationality: Swedish
- Born: 20 October 1944 (age 81) Boden, Sweden

Sport
- Sport: Boxing

Kjell Fredriksson (born 20 October 1944) is a Swedish boxer. He competed in the men's bantamweight event at the 1968 Summer Olympics.
