= Bernd Englmeier =

German boxer

Personal information
- Nationality: German
- Born: 4 February 1945 (age 80); Zwickau, Germany

Sport
- Sport: Boxing

Bernd Englmeier (born 4 February 1945) is a German boxer. He competed in the men's light flyweight event at the 1968 Summer Olympics.
