= Mike Tyson vs. Mitch Green =

Boxing match

New York Is Busting Out
- Date: May 20, 1986
- Venue: Madison Square Garden, New York, New York, U.S.

Tale of the tape
Boxer	Mike Tyson	Mitch Green
Nickname	Kid Dynamite	Blood
Hometown	Catskill, New York, U.S.	Queens, New York, U.S.
Purse	$250,000	$30,000
Pre-fight record	20–0 (19 KO)	16–1–1 (10 KO)
Age	19 years, 10 months	29 years, 4 months
Height	5 ft 10 in (178 cm)	6 ft 5 in (196 cm)
Weight	215 lb (98 kg)	233 lb (106 kg)
Style	Orthodox	Orthodox
Recognition	WBC; No. 8 Ranked Heavyweight; IBF; No. 9 Ranked Heavyweight	WBC; No. 7 Ranked Heavyweight

Result
- Tyson wins via 10-round unanimous decision

Mike Tyson vs. Mitch Green, billed as New York Is Busting Out, was a professional boxing match contested on May 20, 1986.

== Background ==
Mike Tyson was 19 years old and undefeated when he met former heavyweight contender James "Quick" Tillis in his 20th professional bout. Tyson had won all his 19 previous fights by way of knockout, while Tillis had lost four of his previous five fights and came into the fight as a huge underdog. Tillis, however, put on a good effort and was able to take Tyson the full 10 rounds, the first time in Tyson's professional career; Tyson won by unanimous decision. Only four days later, it was announced that Tyson would next face Mitch "Blood" Green, who was ranked one spot ahead of Tyson on the WBC heavyweight standings, on May 20 in Madison Square Garden. Despite Green being higher than Tyson in the rankings, there was a huge disparity in the fighter's purse, Tyson was guaranteed $250,000 while Green was due to make only $30,000. Because of this, Green threatened to pull out of the fight only one day before it was to take place unless his purse was increased. However, after HBO executive Ross Greenberg informed Green that a shot at the WBC heavyweight title was on the line, Green chose to continue on with the fight.

The bout was under jeopardy because of the Rangers' performance at the Stanley Cup playoffs, to whom it was a home arena. Plaza Convention Center in Albany, New York, was considered as a possible replacement, however no new site was announced.

== The fight ==
"I was impressed. He's determined, aggressive, he punches hard. Mitch Green takes a punch. I know because I fought him."

— Trevor Berbick, WBC champion, on Tyson's performance

Though Tyson was in control for most of the fight, he was unable to score a knockdown over Green. In a precursor to future Tyson fights, most notably his championship fights the following year against James "Bonecrusher" Smith and Tony Tucker, Green clinched Tyson on a regular basis in an effort to reduce the effectiveness of Tyson's power punches. Green, however, offered very little offensively, and Tyson was able to win a unanimous decision by two scores of 9–1, and one score of 8–2.

== Aftermath ==
=== 1988 street fight ===
Though the two fighters never again faced each other in a boxing ring, Tyson and Green were involved in a high-profile street fight two years later, by which time Tyson was the Undisputed Heavyweight Champion. On August 23, 1988, Green confronted Tyson at Dapper Dan's in Harlem, claiming that Tyson's promoter Don King owed him money. The argument then escalated into a physical confrontation during which Tyson landed a straight right hand across Green's face, completely shutting Green's left eye and opening a cut across his nose that required five stitches. Tyson, however, did not walk away unscathed, as his right hand was fractured during the melee, causing his scheduled October fight against Frank Bruno to be pushed back. Tyson later recounted the incident in his book and in 2013 on his one-man Broadway show, The Undisputed Truth.

== Undercard ==
Confirmed bouts:

- (United States) Buddy McGirt TKOs (United States) Ricky Young in the tenth round
- (United States Virgin Islands) Julian Jackson TKOs (United States) Derrick Drane in the second round
- (Syria) Mustafa Hamsho KOs (United States) Ernie White in the fourth round.
- (Canada) Matthew Hilton KOs (United States) Bobby McCorvey in the first round.

== Broadcasting ==
Country	Broadcaster
United Kingdom	ITV
United States	HBO

Preceded by vs. James Tillis	Mike Tyson's bouts 20 May 1986	Succeeded by vs. Reggie Gross
Preceded by vs. Percell Davis	Mitch Green's bouts 20 May 1986	Succeeded by vs. Bruce Johnson
