= Domingo Casco =

Argentine boxer

Personal information
- Born: 14 August 1948 Presidente de la Plaza, Argentina
- Died: 8 April 2024 (aged 75)

Sport
- Sport: Boxing

Domingo Casco (14 August 1948 – 8 April 2024) was an Argentine boxer. He competed in the men's bantamweight event at the 1968 Summer Olympics.
