= David Nata =

Zambian boxer (1951–1982)

Personal information
- Nationality: Zambian
- Born: 18 March 1951; Kitwe, Zambia
- Died: 22 December 1982 (aged 31); Kitwe, Zambia

Sport
- Sport: Boxing

David Nata (18 March 1951 – 22 December 1982) was a Zambian boxer. He competed in the men's light flyweight event at the 1968 Summer Olympics. At the 1968 Summer Olympics, he lost to Tahar Aziz of Morocco.
