= Manolo Vicera =

Filipino boxer

Personal information
- Nationality: Filipino
- Born: February 18, 1950 (age 76) Manila, Philippines
- Height: 5 ft 0 in (153 cm)
- Weight: 106 lb (48 kg)

Sport
- Sport: Boxing
- Weight class: Light flyweight

Manolo S. Vicera (born February 15, 1950) is a Filipino former amateur boxer. He competed in the men's light flyweight event at the 1968 Summer Olympics.
