= Mitch Green =

American boxer (born 1957)

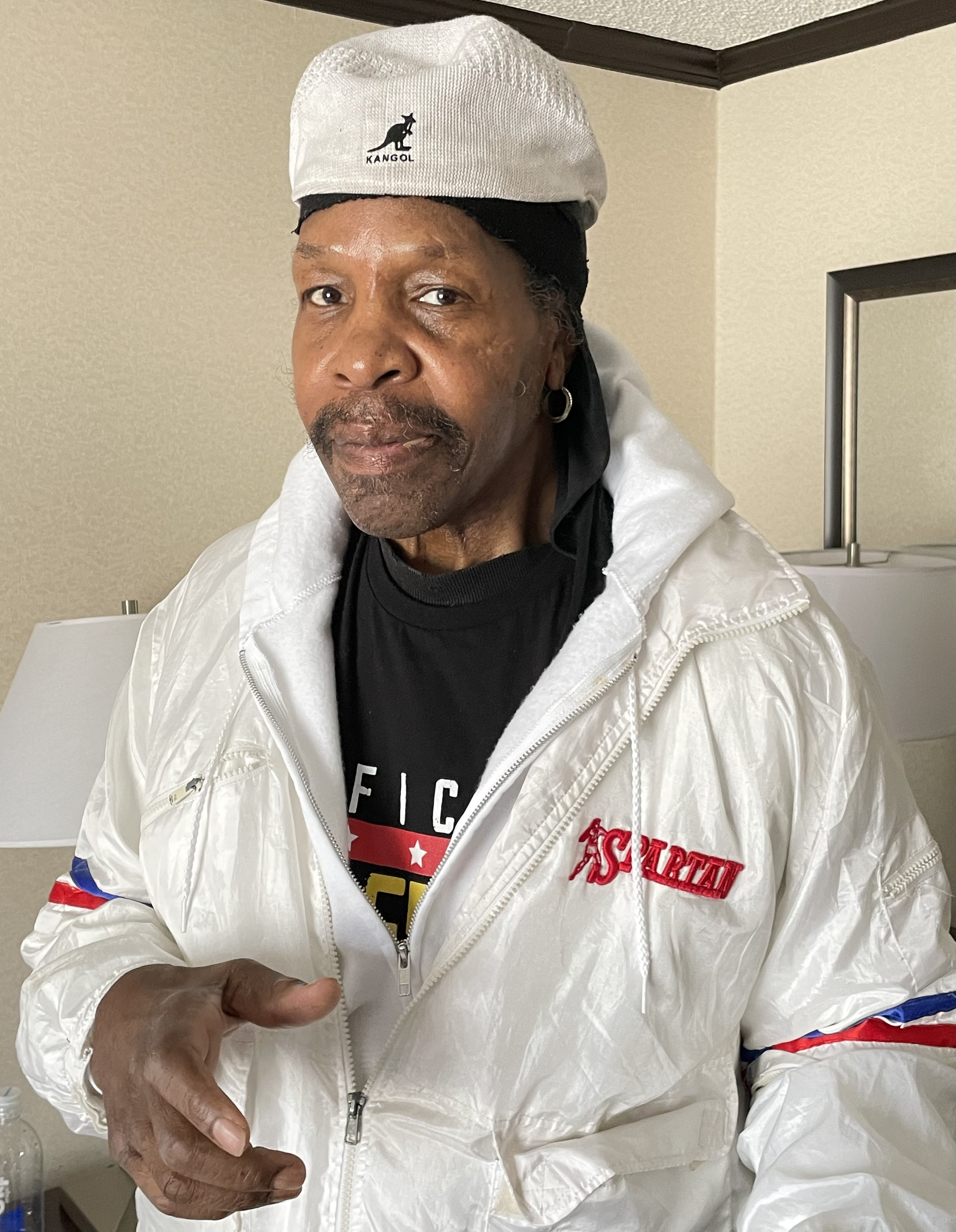
- Green in 2024

Personal information
- Nickname: Blood
- Born: Mitchell Green; January 13, 1957 (age 69) Augusta, Georgia, U.S.
- Height: 6 ft 5 in (196 cm)
- Weight: Heavyweight

Boxing career
- Reach: 82 in (208 cm)
- Stance: Orthodox

Boxing record
- Total fights: 27
- Wins: 19
- Win by KO: 12
- Losses: 6
- Draws: 1
- No contests: 1

Mitch Green (born January 13, 1957) is an American former professional boxer who competed from 1980 to 2005. He is best known for being the second man to have gone the distance with Mike Tyson in 1986, who was undefeated at the time. Two years later, in 1988, Green ended up fighting Tyson again in a notorious street brawl. A toothpick dangling between his lips became his trademark at any public appearance.

== Early years ==
Green grew up in Mt. Hope, Bronx, a smaller neighborhood in Tremont, Bronx on 175th St. between Anthony and Clay Aves. "I was shot twice when I was 17. But it had to have been the will of God that I wasn't hurt" said Green. The first time Green was shot, it was with a .22 magnum. The bullet passed through his right wrist, but the slug missed arteries, bones and nerves and Green was fighting again a few weeks later. The second time he sustained a graze wound, when a slug slashed the right side of his head, leaving a short, puffy scar. Ironically, it was the gunfights that led Green to less lethal boxing. Later he moved to Jamaica, Queens, where he reportedly quarreled with another Jamaica resident and talented amateur boxer Carl Williams.

Green attended DeWitt Clinton High School while employed as a security guard.

== Amateur career ==
As an amateur he won the New York Golden Gloves four times (1976, 1977, 1979, and 1980) and compiled a record of 64 wins and 7 losses, with 51 wins by knockout. Green won the 1976 Sub-Novice Heavyweight Championship and the 1977, 1979 and 1980 Heavyweight Open Championships. Green defeated Anthony Zampelli to win the 1976 title. In 1977 Green defeated Guy Casale for the title. In 1979 Green defeated Ralph Fucci for the Championship and in 1980 Green defeated Merlin Castellanos for the title. He suffered a decisive cut loss in the 1978 tournament, preventing him from winning a fifth Golden Gloves title.

He was also a two-time Intercity Golden Gloves champion. In 1977 he won the title by KO in round one over Calvin Cross and again in 1979 by a decision over William Hosea.

"I hit him with double rights twice, and he had to go down. But he didn't. He refused. I couldn't believe it. And I put a couple of left hooks right on the money. IT WAS A WAR."

— Marvis Frazier on fighting Green.

Mitch lost against Russian boxing great Igor Vysotsky in a 1978 matchup, and was considered a prospect for the 1980 Olympic Games (held in Moscow), but the U.S. boycotted the event, and Green also lost to Marvis Frazier in the quarterfinals of the Olympic Trials that year. He did, however, in the finals of the Eastern Regionals, manage to beat perennial contender Woody Clark.

In amateur competition Green also lost bouts to future world champions Greg Page and Tony Tubbs, though he did manage to beat Tubbs in the 1978 Sports Festival. Surprisingly, he also lost to future cruiserweight champion Alfonzo Ratliff in a 1980 New York−Chicago intercity matchup.

Green trained at the United Block Association Gym in New York City. At that time he was employed as a security guard.

=== Highlights ===
- (gold) 50th New York Golden Gloves, Madison Square Garden, New York City, March 19, 1976, Finals: Defeated Anthony Zampelli (Solar Sporting Club, NYC) by decision
- (gold) 51st New York Golden Gloves, Madison Square Garden, New York City, March 11, 1977, Finals: Defeated Guy Casale (Empire Sporting Club, NYC) RSC 1 (2:15)
- (gold) 35th Intercity Golden Gloves, Madison Square Garden, New York City, April 18, 1977: Defeated Calvin Cross (Woodlawn Boys Club, Chicago) KO 1 (2:07)
- (bronze) U.S. National Championships, Winston-Salem, North Carolina, May 6, 1977, Semi-Finals: Lost to Greg Page by decision
- USA–USSR Heavy Duals, Hilton Pavilion, Las Vegas, Nevada, December 10, 1977: Defeated ? (Soviet Union)
- USSR−USA Duals, Alma-Ata, Kazakh SSR, March 31, 1978: Lost to Igor Vysotsky (Soviet Union) by decision
- (gold) National Sports Festival, Fort Carson, Colorado, July 27–29, 1978:
  - Semi-Finals: Defeated Jerry Williams by decision
  - Finals: Defeated Tony Tubbs (Santa Monica) by decision
- (gold) AAU Intercity Semi-Finals, Felt Forum, New York City, November 10, 1978: Defeated James Smith (Philadelphia)
- (gold) 53rd New York Golden Gloves, Madison Square Garden, New York City, February 23 – March 16, 1979:
  - Preliminaries: Defeated Christopher Pinkston (unattached) by decision
  - Finals: Defeated Ralph Fucci (Recreation's Lost Battalion Hall, NYC) KO 1 (1:50)
- (gold) 37th Intercity Golden Gloves, Madison Square Garden, New York City, April 23, 1979: Defeated William Hosea (Chicago) by decision
- (gold) AAU Intercity Boxing championships, Madison Square Garden, New York City, October 24, 1979: Defeated Terry Henderson (Atlanta) RSC 2 (3:36)
- (gold) AAU Intercity Finals, Madison Square Garden, New York City, January 5, 1980: Defeated Mike Ganz (San Francisco) KO 1 (1:05)
- (gold) 54th New York Golden Gloves, Madison Square Garden, New York City, March 14, 1980, Finals: Defeated Merling Castellano (Bronx)
- 38th Intercity Golden Gloves, Chicago, Illinois, April 11, 1980: Lost to Alfonzo Ratliff (Chicago) by decision
- Olympic Trials, Atlanta, Georgia, June 16, 1980, Quarter-Finals: Lost to Marvis Frazier by unanimous decision, 0–5

In February 1979, Green was ranked #5 U.S. amateur heavyweight by the U.S. Amateur Boxers and Coaches Association. He has quit his job to spend full time preparing for the 1980 Olympics. "I'm really getting it together. I'm taking time out so I can just think about boxing," he said. In the beginning of 1980 he went to Tennessee, where he sparred with WBA world heavyweight champion John Tate, and Washington D.C., where he trained with Dave Jacobs, Sugar Ray Leonard's trainer. "I want to go pro right after the Gloves. I had wanted very much to go to the Olympics, you know, give those Russians a bit of New York. But now I'll just see if I can make a living at it," said Green.

== Professional career ==
Green turned pro in 1980, signing a contract with the rock promoter Shelly Finkel, whom he met at the 1979 New York Golden Gloves. As a professional, Green was one of NBC's "Tomorrow's Champions" (a group of Finkel's young pros, which also included Alex Ramos, Tony Ayala Jr., Donald Curry and Johnny Bumphus) and was ranked as high as #7 by the World Boxing Council, and also in the top ten by the World Boxing Association. Green left Finkel after a year as a pro after a disagreement over payoffs. He was managed by Carl King, son of Don King, who was Green's promoter.

Mitch was undefeated in his first sixteen bouts, which included a 1983 points win over the rugged Floyd "Jumbo" Cummings, and a draw with trial horse Robert Evans. His first loss was a twelve-round decision to future WBC champ Trevor Berbick in a bid for the United States Boxing Association title on August 10, 1985.

In March 1985, Green violently interrupted a pre-fight press conference of the Larry Holmes vs David Bey championship fight, claiming that he was a better contender than Bey, and seeking for a clash with Don King's people.

Green was scheduled to fight James Broad for the NABF title in 1985, but dropped out of the fight for money reasons.

=== Green vs. Tyson ===
"He's got great hand speed. He punches well and boxes well. Also, he's very mobile. It's the combination of those assets - not any one quality - that makes him an interesting opponent."

— Jim Jacobs, Tyson's manager, on Green

After a comeback win over Percell Davis he lost a ten-round decision to Mike Tyson in 1986 on HBO, in his most famous fight. In the buildup to the fight Green had complained bitterly of the disparity in purses between him and Tyson when a day before the fight, at weigh-ins, Green learned he was being paid $30,000 in comparison to Tyson's $200,000 for the fight alone, in addition to a $1 million deal with HBO for the live broadcast of three fights. He threatened to pull out of the contest, finally settling for being released from his managerial contract with King's stepson Carl in return for his short purse. Green put up a stubborn showing during the fight, despite losing his mouthpiece during the third round, along with "a bridge with a couple of teeth in", as mentioned by HBO sports commentator Barry Tompkins, at the very beginning of the fourth round.

A week later Green was released from his contract by manager Carl King, who was criticized the previous week by Green for mishandling his career.

=== Later years ===
Green was later signed to face James “Bonecrusher” Smith on December 12, 1986 as part of a Don King-produced event for HBO from Madison Square Garden. The match between Green and Smith was to serve as part of the event’s undercard, with Tim Witherspoon set to defend his WBA championship in a rematch against former champion Tony Tubbs, from whom Witherspoon had wrested the championship eleven months earlier. After Tubbs pulled out of the contest with a reported injury, Witherspoon instead gave Smith, whom he had beaten in a twelve-round decision in 1985 to earn the shot at Tubbs, a rematch with the title on the line; Green was left off of the event, as a result, since a replacement opponent was not found. Green later appeared at the Witherspoon–Smith pre-fight negotiations, again threatening Don King.

Green refused to box for many years and was in frequent trouble with the law. He finally returned to the ring in February 1993, then aged 36, against journeyman Bruce Johnson. Again complaining about his purse and his new manager, Green refused to throw any punches and argued constantly with the referee, until the exasperated ref stopped the bizarre contest in the third.

Throughout the 1990s, Green sporadically came out of retirement, most notably in bids for the New York State heavyweight title, against fringe contenders Melvin Foster in 1994 and Brian Nix in 1998. A 1998 win over Mike Dixon was ruled a 'no contest' when Green tested positive for marijuana. A December 1995 contest with Shannon Briggs fell apart when Green was arrested for smashing up his manager's office during a dispute.

Mitch was considered as a participant for the first Ultimate Fighting Championship (UFC) tournament.

In the early 2000s, an aged Green held two spurious championships. He won the World Boxing Empire (originally the World Boxing Syndicate) super heavyweight title with a twelve-round decision over Danny Wofford on March 9, 2002. On June 24, 2005 he was proclaimed the Universal Boxing Organization heavyweight champion. He never defended either title. His last fight was a fourth-round knockout of Billy Mitchem on August 2, 2005

== Feud with Mike Tyson ==
Green was also known for an incident that began in the early hours of August 23, 1988, in Harlem. Tyson and some friends were shopping at Dapper Dan's, a Harlem clothing store. Green had heard that Tyson was in the area and found him, demanding a rematch. A scuffle ensued. Green allegedly threw a punch and Tyson responded with a punch of his own, closing Green's eye and requiring stitches to his nose. Tyson broke his hand in the incident and had to postpone his first fight with Frank Bruno. Later, although a New York jury awarded Green $45,000 in damages in a civil lawsuit against Tyson, the sum did not cover the legal fees. Tyson later recounted his version of the fight in his book and Broadway show Undisputed Truth, as well as on his Hotboxin' with Mike Tyson podcast.

== Personal life ==
Green currently resides in Jamaica, Queens, NY.

In the late 2010s, an inaccurate rumor began to circulate online that Mitch had become involved in ministry due to a YouTube video featuring a pastor named Mitch Green.

Green was involved in street gangs during his youth, and became a gang leader with the New York City-based Black Spades.

Mitch was inducted into the New York State Boxing Hall of Fame on March 23, 2025.

== Professional boxing record ==
27 fights	19 wins	6 losses
By knockout	12	1
By decision	7	5
Draws	1	
No contests	1	

No.	Result	Record	Opponent	Type	Round, time	Date	Location	Notes
27	Win	19–6–1 (1)	(United States) Billy Mitchem	KO	4 (8), 2:14	Aug 02, 2005	(United States) The New Daisy Theatre, Memphis, Tennessee, U.S.	
26	Win	18–6–1 (1)	(United States) Danny Wofford	UD	12	Mar 09, 2002	(United States) Annandale, Virginia, U.S.	
25	Loss	17–6–1 (1)	(United States) Brian Nix	UD	10	Oct 02, 1998	(United States) Sportsfest Staten Island, New York City, New York, U.S.	For New York State heavyweight title
24	Loss	17–5–1 (1)	(Puerto Rico) Miguel Otero	UD	8	Sep 12, 1998	(United States) Sons of Italy, Lake Worth, Florida, U.S.	
23	NC	17–4–1 (1)	(United States) Mike Dixon	SD	8	Jul 25, 1998	(United States) Sons of Italy, Lake Worth, Florida, U.S.	Originally a Split Decision win for Green, later ruled a No Contest after he failed a drug test
22	Win	17–4–1	(United States) Lou Turchiarelli	TKO	6 (10)	Aug 18, 1995	(United States) Middletown, New York, U.S.	
21	Loss	16–4–1	(United States) Melvin Foster	UD	10	Jun 02, 1994	(United States) Melville Hilton, Huntington, New York, U.S.	For vacant New York State heavyweight title
20	Loss	16–3–1	(United States) Bruce Johnson	TKO	3	Feb 26, 1993	(United States) Total Sports Pavilion, Woodbridge, Virginia, U.S.	Fight stopped due to Green refusing to throw punches
19	Loss	16–2–1	(United States) Mike Tyson	UD	10	May 20, 1986	(United States) Madison Square Garden, New York City, New York, U.S.	
18	Win	16–1–1	(United States) Percell Davis	UD	10	Jan 17, 1986	(United States) Omni Coliseum, Atlanta, Georgia, U.S.	
17	Loss	15–1–1	(Jamaica) Trevor Berbick	MD	12	Aug 10, 1985	(United States) Riviera, Winchester, Nevada, U.S.	For USBA heavyweight title
16	Win	15–0–1	(United States) Sammy Scaff	TKO	6, 1:41	Aug 31, 1984	(United States) Riviera, Winchester, Nevada, U.S.	
15	Win	14–0–1	(United States) Young Louis	TKO	6 (10), 0:49	Jul 15, 1984	(United States) Municipal Auditorium, Kingston, New York, U.S.	
14	Win	13–0–1	(United States) Lynwood Jones	TKO	1 (10), 0:48	Mar 21, 1984	(United States) Showboat Hotel and Casino, Las Vegas, Nevada, U.S.	
13	Win	12–0–1	(United States) James Dixon	PTS	10	Jul 17, 1983	(United States) Dunes, Paradise, Nevada, U.S.	
12	Win	11–0–1	(United States) Floyd Cummings	UD	10	Feb 16, 1983	(United States) Brendan Byrne Arena, East Rutherford, New Jersey, U.S.	
11	Win	10–0–1	(United States) Lon Dale Friesen	KO	2 (8)	Oct 02, 1982	(United States) Sands, Atlantic City, New Jersey, U.S.	
10	Win	9–0–1	(United States) Grady Daniels	UD	8	Aug 14, 1982	(United States) Stouffer's Inn on the Square, Cleveland, Ohio, U.S.	
9	Win	8–0–1	(United States) Walter Santemore	UD	6	Jun 11, 1982	(United States) Caesars Palace, Paradise, Nevada, U.S.	
8	Win	7–0–1	(United States) Walter Ware	TKO	1 (6), 2:48	May 2, 1982	(United States) Playboy Hotel and Casino, Atlantic City, New Jersey, U.S.	
7	Win	6–0–1	(United States) Willard Dumas	KO	1 (6)	Apr 09, 1982	(United States) Stouffer's Inn on the Square, Cleveland, Ohio, U.S.	
6	Win	5–0–1	(United States) Melvin Epps	UD	6	Jun 21, 1981	(United States) Playboy Hotel and Casino, Atlantic City, New Jersey, U.S.	
5	Draw	4–0–1	(United States) Robert Evans	PTS	6	Feb 08, 1981	(United States) The Great Gorge Playboy Club Hotel, McAfee, New Jersey, U.S.	
4	Win	4–0	(United States) Lindsay Page	TKO	2 (6)	Jan 22, 1981	(United States) Ice World, Totowa, New Jersey, U.S.	
3	Win	3–0	(United States) Harold Rice	TKO	5 (6), 0:16	Dec 20, 1980	(United States) Kingsbridge Armory, New York City, New York, U.S.	
2	Win	2–0	(United States) Johnny Pitts	TKO	3 (6)	Nov 25, 1980	(United States) Civic Center, Hartford, Connecticut, U.S.	
1	Win	1–0	(United States) Jerry Foley	TKO	1 (6), 1:44	Nov 08, 1980	(United States) Stateline, Nevada, U.S.	

== Exhibition boxing record ==
1 fight	0 wins	0 losses
Non-scored	1	

No.	Result	Record	Opponent	Type	Round, time	Date	Location	Notes
1	—N/a	0–0 (1)	(United States) Larry Holmes	—N/a	2	Mar 27, 1982	Playboy Hotel & Casino, Atlantic City, New Jersey, USA	Non-scored bout
