= Constantin Nour =

Romanian bocer

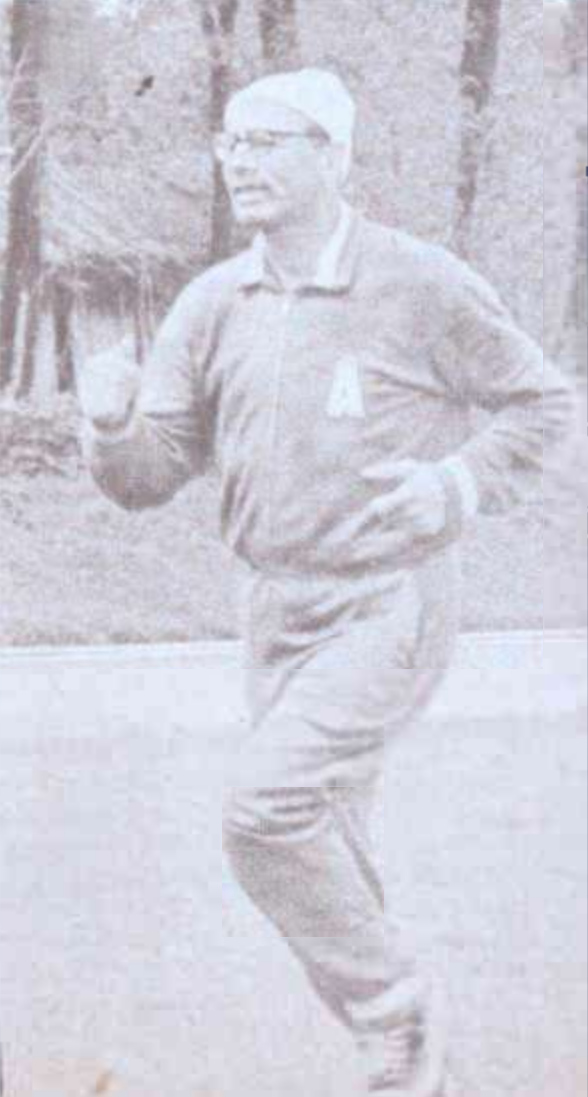

Personal information
- Nationality: (Romania) Romanian
- Born: June 15, 1907 Tiraspol, Russian Empire
- Died: November 17, 1986 (aged 79) Baba Ana, Socialist Republic of Romania
- Height: 5 ft 10 in (1.78 m)
- Weight: Middleweight

Boxing career

Boxing record
- Total fights: 30
- Wins: 10
- Win by KO: 6
- Losses: 16
- Draws: 4

Constantin Nour (June 13, 1906 or June 15, 1907, Tiraspol — November 17, 1986) was a Romanian champion middleweight boxer and national team trainer.

In 1926, he won the Romanian national championship in the middleweight category.

Nour, who was a so-called Honored Trainer ("Antrenor emerit"), trained both the Romanian national junior and the senior teams.

== Disciples ==
- Olympic champions Nicolae Linca and Ion Monea
- Olympic silver medal winners Mircea Şimon and Mircea Dobrescu
- European triple champion (flyweight, super flyweight and bantamweight) Lucian Popescu

== Legacy ==
His old club, Dinamo Bucharest, has a boxing gym named in his honor.

== Professional boxing record ==
10 Wins (6 knockouts, 3 decisions, 1 disqualification), 16 Losses (3 knockouts, 11 decisions 2 disqualifications), 4 Draws
Result	Record	Opponent	Type	Round	Date	Location	Notes
Loss	6-8-5	(Romania) Dumitru Călinescu	DQ	2 (10)	1934-10-31	Timișoara, Romania	
Loss	1-5	(Romania) Dumitru Pavelescu	PTS	10 (10)	1932-02-27	Sidoli Circus, Bucharest, Romania	
Loss	10-8-9	(Romania) Mihai Fulea	KO	3 (10)	1931-05-09	Bucharest, Romania	
Draw	71-37-21	(France) Auguste Lengagne	PTS	10 (10)	1930-05-15	Boulogne-sur-Mer, France	
Loss	30-37-3	(France) Maurice Kunter	DQ	1 (10)	1930-05-10	Central Sporting Club, Paris, France	
Loss	9-8-5	(France) Emile Caulier	TKO	10 (10)	1930-03-22	Central Sporting Club, Paris, France	
Loss	6-4-8	(Romania) Mihai Fulea	PTS	10 (10)	1929-12-14	Bucharest, Romania	
Draw	6-4-7	(Romania) Mihai Fulea	PTS	10 (10)	1929-11-16	Bucharest, Romania	
Win	27-6-2	(France) Martin Franchi	PTS	10 (10)	1929-06-09	Bucharest, Romania	
Win	5-7-1	(Egypt) Ali Sadek	PTS	10 (10)	1929-05-25	Bucharest, Romania	
Loss	27-10-15	(Romania) Motzi Spakow	PTS	10 (10)	1929-04-20	Bucharest, Romania	For Romanian middleweight title.
Loss	44-9-4	(France) Michel Riond	PTS	10 (10)	1929-03-16	Bucharest, Romania	
Loss	6-9-2	(France) Louis Legras	PTS	8 (8)	1929-02-16	Central Sporting Club, Paris, France	
Win	6-8-2	(France) Louis Legras	DQ	3 (10)	1929-02-02	Central Sporting Club, Paris, France	
Win	9-11-5	(France) Henri Barras	PTS	10 (10)	1929-01-19	Central Sporting Club, Paris, France	
Draw	23-9-13	(Romania) Motzi Spakow	PTS	10 (10)	1928-12-08	Bucharest, Romania	
Loss	10-3-4	(Italy) Umberto Lancia	PTS	10 (10)	1928-09-13	Bucharest, Romania	
Loss	4-4-2	(Romania) Dumitru Teica	PTS	10 (10)	1928-01-14	Bucharest, Romania	
Draw	14-5-10	(Romania) Motzi Spakow	PTS	10 (10)	1927-11-23	Bucharest, Romania	
Win	38-15-14	(France) Emile Romerio	TKO	2 (10)	1927-05-14	Bucharest, Romania	
Loss	16-3-4	(Austria) Poldi Steinbach	PTS	10 (10)	1927-04-10	Bucharest, Romania	
Win	4-1	(Romania) Dumitru Teica	KO	3 (10)	1927-02-27	Bucharest, Romania	
Win	4-0	(Romania) Dumitru Teica	KO	2 (10)	1927-02-26	Bucharest, Romania	
Loss	0-1	(Bulgaria) Boris Alexeev	KO	1 (10)	1927-02-12	Bucharest, Romania	
Loss	2-0	(Romania) Dumitru Teica	PTS	10 (10)	1927-01-19	Bucharest, Romania	For Romanian heavyweight title.
Loss	15-2-4	(Austria) Poldi Steinbach	TKO	5 (10)	1926-06-05	Bucharest, Romania	
Loss	1-0	(Romania) Dumitru Teica	PTS	10 (10)	1926-04-01	Bucharest, Romania	
Win	0-0	(Italy) Al Puggi	KO	2 (10)	1926-03-06	Bucharest, Romania	
Win	0-0	(Italy) Umberto Lancia	PTS	6 (6)	1926-02-01	Bucharest, Romania	
Win	0-0	(Italy) Gaspard Luiggi	RTD	1 (10)	1923-09-30	Galați, Romania	

== Awards ==
- Honored Trainer ("Antrenor emerit")
- In 1976, he was awarded the title Meritul Sportiv Cl. II ("The Sport Merit, Second Class").
