= Mahmoud Ladjili =

Tunisian boxer (born 1946)

Personal information
- Nationality: Tunisian
- Born: 18 February 1946 (age 79); Tunis, Tunisia

Sport
- Sport: Boxing

Mahmoud Ladjili (born 18 February 1946) is a Tunisian boxer. He competed in the men's bantamweight event at the 1968 Summer Olympics.
