= Joaquín Rocha =

Mexican boxer (born 1944)

Olympic medal record

Men's Boxing
Bronze medal – third place	1968 Mexico City	Heavyweight

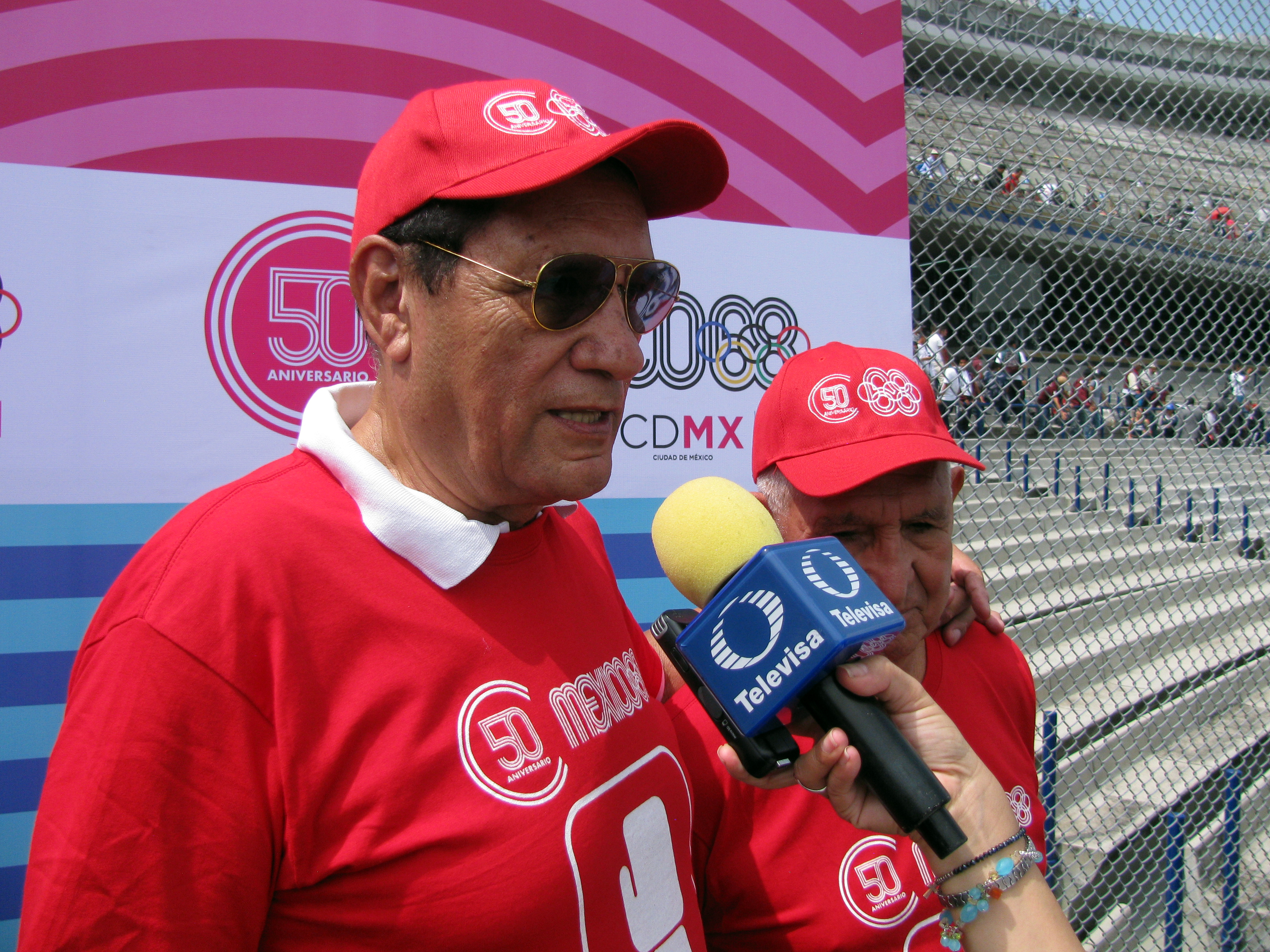
Joaquín Rocha (2018)

Joaquín Rocha Herrera (born August 16, 1944, in Mexico City) is a Mexican former Olympic heavyweight boxer.

== Amateur career ==
Rocha was a 1968 Olympic boxing bronze medalist in the heavyweight division at Mexico City in 1968.

== 1968 Olympic results ==
Below is the record of Joaquin Rocha, a Mexican heavyweight boxer who competed at the 1968 Mexico City Olympics:

- Round of 16: defeated Adonis Ray (Ghana) by decision, 4-1
- Quarterfinal: defeated Rudi Lubbers (Netherlands) by decision, 3-2
- Semifinal: lost to Jonas Chpulis (Soviet Union) referee stopped contest (was awarded bronze medal)

=== References ===
- databaseOlympics
- Olympic Results
