= Giorgio Bambini =

Italian boxer (1945–2015)

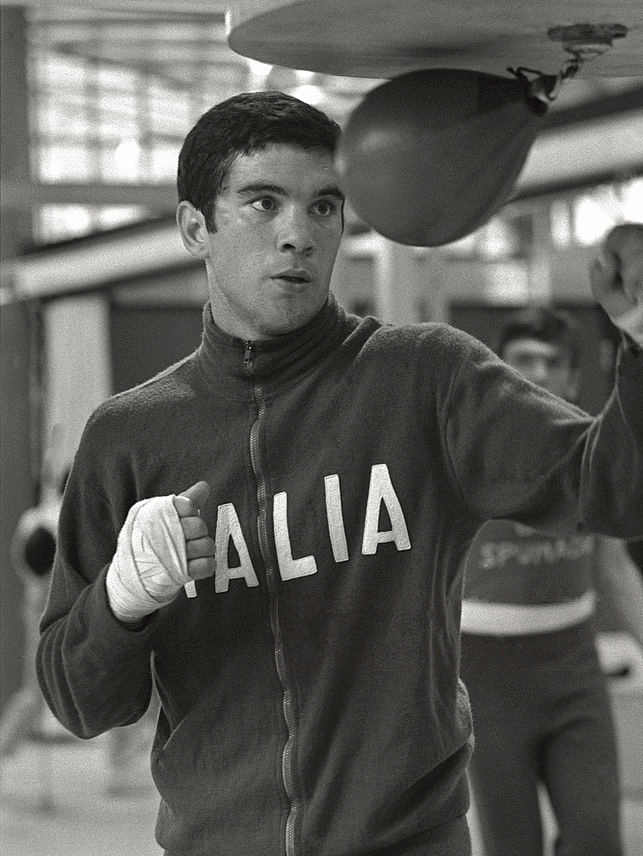
- Giorgio Bambini at the 1968 Olympics

Personal information
- Nationality: Italian
- Born: 24 February 1945 La Spezia, Italy
- Died: 13 November 2015 (aged 70) La Spezia, Italy
- Height: 1.92 m (6 ft 4 in)
- Weight: Heavyweight

Boxing career

Boxing record
- Total fights: 15
- Wins: 15
- Win by KO: 5
- Losses: 0
- Draws: 0
Medal record
Representing Italy
Summer Olympics
Bronze medal – third place	1968 Mexico City	Heavyweight
Mediterranean Games
Gold medal – first place	1967 Tunis	+81 kg

Giorgio Bambini (24 February 1945 – 13 November 2015) was an Italian heavyweight boxer who won a bronze medal at the 1968 Summer Olympics. After that he turned professional, and won all his 15 bouts in Italy before retiring in 1971.
