= Nikola Savov =

Bulgarian boxer

Personal information
- Nationality: Bulgarian
- Born: 8 July 1942 (age 83) Sliven, Bulgaria

Sport
- Sport: Boxing
Medal record
Men's boxing
Representing Bulgaria
European Amateur Boxing Championships
Bronze medal – third place	1967 Rome	Bantamweight

Nikola Savov (born 8 July 1942) is a Bulgarian boxer. He competed in the men's bantamweight event at the 1968 Summer Olympics.
