= Viktor Zaporozhets =

Ukrainian boxer (1947–2026)

Personal information
- Native name: Віктор Констянтинович Запорожець
- Full name: Viktor Konsiantynovych Zaporozhets
- Nationality: Ukrainian
- Born: 23 May 1947 Volchansk, Sverdlovsk Oblast, Russian SFSR, Soviet Union
- Died: 11 February 2026 (aged 78)

Sport
- Sport: Boxing

Viktor Konstiantynovych Zaporozhets (Ukrainian: Віктор Костянтинович Запорожець; 23 May 1947 – 11 February 2026) was a Soviet boxer. He competed in the men's light flyweight event at the 1968 Summer Olympics for the Soviet Union and finished in ninth place.

Zaporozhets died on 11 February 2026, at the age of 78.
