= Nicolae Gîju =

Romanian boxer (born 1943)

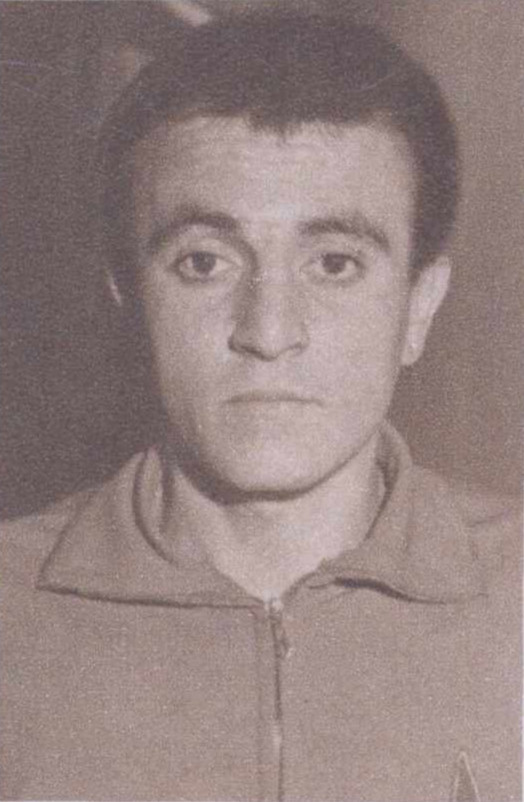
- Nicolae Gîju, c.1966

Personal information
- Nationality: Romanian
- Born: 4 October 1943 (age 82) Craiova, Romania

Sport
- Sport: Boxing
Medal record
Representing Romania
Romania National Amateur Boxing Championships
Silver medal – second place	1964 Bucharest	-51 kg
Gold medal – first place	1965 Bucharest	-54 kg
Gold medal – first place	1966 Bucharest	-54 kg
Gold medal – first place	1967 Bucharest	-54 kg
Gold medal – first place	1968 Bucharest	-54 kg
Silver medal – second place	1970 Bucharest	-57 kg
European Amateur Championships
Gold medal – first place	1967 Rome	-54 kg
Bronze medal – third place	1965 East Berlin	-54 kg

Nicolae Gîju (born 4 October 1943) is a Romanian boxer. He competed in the men's bantamweight event at the 1968 Summer Olympics.
