= Danas Pozniakas =

Lithuanian boxer (1939–2005)

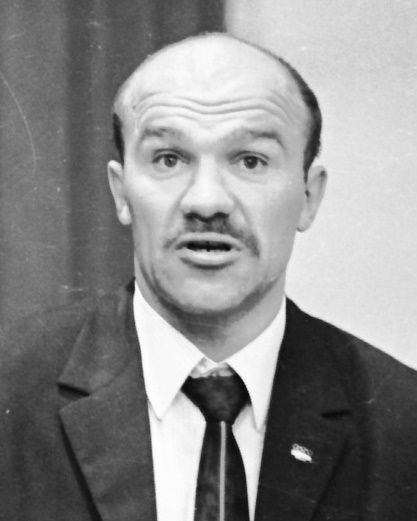

Personal information
- Born: 19 October 1939 Tolchak, Białystok, Soviet Union
- Died: 4 February 2005 (aged 65) Vilnius, Lithuania
- Height: 182 cm (6 ft 0 in)
- Weight: 81 kg (179 lb)

Sport
- Sport: Boxing
- Club: Armed Forces sports society (1959–1966); Trudovye Rezervy Vilnius (1968–1969)
Medal record
Representing the Soviet Union
Olympic Games
Gold medal – first place	1968 Mexico City	-81 kg
European Amateur Championships
Silver medal – second place	1963 Moscow	-81 kg
Gold medal – first place	1965 Berlin	-81 kg
Gold medal – first place	1967 Rome	-81 kg
Gold medal – first place	1969 Bucharest	-81 kg

Danas Pozniakas (19 October 1939 – 4 February 2005) was a Lithuanian amateur light-heavyweight boxer who won the European title in 1965, 1967 and 1969 and an Olympic gold medal in 1968.

Pozniakas was born in Poland as Dan Pozniak, and in the 1950s moved to Vilnius, Lithuania, where he took up boxing at age 13. He won the Soviet title in 1962 and a European silver medal in 1963, but at the 1964 Olympic trials lost to Aleksei Kiselyov and was not selected. By the next Olympics, he was a double European champion and a clear favorite. He decisively won his first three bouts and received the Olympic gold by default, as his opponent Ion Monea had a broken nose from his previous fight and withdrew from the final. Monea lost to Pozniakas in the 1967 and 1969 European championships.

Pozniakas became the Honoured Master of Sports of the USSR in 1965 and was selected as the Lithuanian Sportsperson of the Year in 1968; in 1969 he was awarded the Order of the Red Banner of Labour. He retired around 1969 with a record of 203 wins out of 217 bouts. In 1974, he became an AIBA international referee and later coached the national team of Seychelles in 1983–88. Between 1991 and 1994 he served as president of Lithuanian Boxing Federation. He died of a heart attack in 2005, aged 65. Since his death in 2005, an annual boxing tournament is held in Vilnius, in his honor.
