= Eridadi Mukwanga =

Ugandan boxer

Personal information
- Born: 12 July 1943
- Died: 1998 (aged 54–55)
Medal record
Men's Boxing
Representing Uganda
Olympic Games
| Silver medal – second place | 1968 Mexico City | Bantamweight |

Eridadi Mukwanga (12 July 1943 – January 1998) was a Ugandan boxer, silver medalist at the 1968 Summer Olympics in Mexico City.

He was the first athlete representing Uganda to win an Olympic medal in any sport.

== Amateur highlights ==
Bantamweight silver medalist at the 1968 Olympics in Mexico City. Results were:

- Defeated Roberto Cervantes (Mexico) points
- Defeated Chang Kyou-Chul (Korea) points
- Lost to Valerian Sokolov (Soviet Union) TKO-2
