= Tunkel =

Tunkel is a German and Yiddish (Yiddish: טונקל, romanized: Tunkl) surname, a cognate of Dunkel, literally meaning "dark" or "confusing" in Middle High German; the word was used as a nickname for a person of darh hair or complexion, or someone who was difficult to understand. In some case the surname came from person's dwelling place in a dark area, such as in thick woods. Notable people with the surname include:

- Nándor Tunkel
- Yaakov Tunkel
- Yosef Tunkel

== See also ==
- Tunkl of Brníčko family
