= Eiji Morioka =

Japanese boxer (1946–2004)

Olympic medal record

Men's Boxing
Bronze medal – third place	1968 Mexico	Bantamweight

Eiji Morioka (森岡 栄治, Morioka Eiji, June 8, 1946 – November 9, 2004) was an Olympic boxing bronze medalist from Osaka, Japan.

== Biography ==
Morioka won the inter-high school boxing tournament in his senior year, and entered Kinki University. He won the Japanese amateur boxing tournament four years in a row from 1965 to 1968. He was chosen as a member of the Japanese Olympic team for the 1968 Summer Olympics, and won a bronze medal in the bantamweight division.

He made his professional debut after graduating, but retired after it was discovered that he had suffered a detached retina. His professional record was 6-4-0 (3KOs).

After retiring, he served as the commissioner of the Western Japan Boxing Commission from 1998 to 2000. He also founded a boxing gym in Kawanishi, Hyogo. He died from cancer in 2004, at 58 years of age.

His nephew, Toshiyuki Morioka, has created a movie based on his life, which was released in Japan in January 2008.

== Olympic results ==
- 1968 won a bantamweight boxing bronze medal at the Mexico City Olympics. Results were:
  - Round of 32: Defeated Dominardo Calumarde (Philippines) on points (4-1)
  - Round of 16: Defeated Aldo Cosentino (France) on points (4-1)
  - Quarterfinal: Defeated Michael Dowling (Ireland) on points (4-1)
  - Semifinal: Lost to Valeri Sokolov (Soviet Union) on points (0-5) (was awarded bronze medal)
