= Josef Kapín =

Czechoslovak boxer

Personal information
- Nationality: Czechoslovak
- Born: 19 May 1945; Prague, Czechoslovakia
- Died: 14 August 2014 (aged 69)

Sport
- Sport: Boxing

Josef Kapín (19 May 1945 – 14 August 2014) was a Czechoslovak boxer. He competed in the men's light heavyweight event at the 1968 Summer Olympics.
