= Chang Kyou-chul =

South Korean boxer

Personal information
- Born: June 19, 1946 Seoul, South Korea
- Died: April 19, 2000 (aged 53)

Sport
- Sport: Boxing
Medal record
Men's boxing
Representing South Korea
Olympic Games
Bronze medal – third place	1968 Mexico	Bantamweight
Asian Amateur Championships
Gold medal – first place	Seoul 1965	Flyweight
Gold medal – first place	Colombo 1967	Bantamweight

Korean name
- Hangul: 장순길
- Hanja: 張淳吉
- RR: Jang Sungil
- MR: Chang Sun'gil

Former name
- Hangul: 장규철
- Hanja: 張奎喆
- RR: Jang Gyucheol
- MR: Chang Kyuch'ŏl

Chang Kyou-chul (a.k.a. Chang Sun-gil; June 19, 1946 – April 19, 2000) was an Olympic boxing bronze medalist in South Korea. He renamed his name Kyou-chul to Sun-gil.

== Amateur career ==
Chang won Asian Championship gold medals in flyweight in 1965 and in bantamweight in 1967.

He won the bronze medal in the bantamweight category at the 1968 Summer Olympics in Mexico City. Chang defeated 1967 European Championship bronze medalist Nikola Savov in the round of 16 and 1959 European Champion Horst Rascher in the quarterfinals. In the semifinals, Chang faced Eridadi Mukwanga of Uganda and knocked him down in the second round but lost by a split decision.

=== Results ===
1968 Olympic Games
Event	Round	Result	Opponent	Score
Bantamweight	First	Win	(Guatemala) Mario Mendoza	5-0
Bantamweight	Second	Win	(Taiwan) Wang Chee-Yen	3-2
Bantamweight	Third	Win	(Bulgaria) Nikola Savov	RSC 3
Bantamweight	Quarterfinal	Win	(West Germany) Horst Rascher	5-0
Bantamweight	Semifinal	Loss	(Uganda) Eridadi Mukwanga	1-4

== Pro career ==
Chang turned pro in 1970 but had limited success.

In his third pro bout, Chang received his first loss after facing future two-time World Champion Hong Soo-hwan. In 1971 however, he captured the OPBF Super Bantamweight title with a win over Koichi Okada. In 1973, Chang faced off against WBA Bantamweight World Champion Romeo Anaya in a non-title bout in Tijuana, Mexico but was knocked out in the 8th round. He lost the OPBF champion belt in 1974 to future WBC Super Bantamweight Champion Yum Dong-kyun and retired later that year.
