= Nancio Carrillo =

Cuban boxer (1950–2018)

Personal information
- Born: 16 August 1950; Matanzas, Cuba
- Died: 7 December 2018 (aged 68)

Sport
- Sport: Boxing

Nancio Carrillo (16 August 1950 – 7 December 2018) was a Cuban boxer. He competed in the men's heavyweight event at the 1968 Summer Olympics.
