= Lahcen Ahidous =

Moroccan boxer (born 1945)

Personal information
- Nationality: Moroccan
- Born: 13 April 1945 (age 79); Casablanca, Morocco

Sport
- Sport: Boxing

Lahcen Ahidous (born 13 April 1945) is a Moroccan boxer. He competed at the 1964 Summer Olympics and the 1968 Summer Olympics.
