= Bernard Malherbe =

French boxer

Personal information
- Nationality: French
- Born: 17 January 1945 (age 80); Herblay, France

Sport
- Sport: Boxing

Bernard Malherbe (born 17 January 1945) is a French boxer. He competed in the men's light heavyweight event at the 1968 Summer Olympics.
