= Hatha Karunaratne =

Sri Lankan boxer

Personal information
- Full name: Hatha Kapuralalage Karunaratne
- Nationality: Sri Lankan
- Born: 21 October 1941; Karawanella, Ceylon
- Died: August 1983; Palali, Sri Lanka

Sport
- Sport: Boxing

Hatha Kapuralalage Karunaratne (21 October 1941 – August 1983) was a Sri Lankan boxer. He competed in the men's light flyweight event at the 1968 Summer Olympics.
