= Ramiro Suárez =

Spanish boxer (born 1947)

Personal information
- Nationality: Spanish
- Born: 7 June 1947 (age 77); Las Palmas, Spain

Sport
- Sport: Boxing

Ramiro Suárez (born 7 June 1947) is a Spanish boxer. He competed in the men's bantamweight event at the 1968 Summer Olympics.
