= Ion Monea =

Romanian boxer (1940–2011)

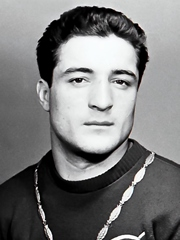
- Monea in 1960

Personal information
- Born: 30 November 1940 Tohanu Vechi, National Legionary State
- Died: 1 March 2011 (aged 70) Bucharest, Romania
- Height: 178 cm (5 ft 10 in)
- Weight: 75 kg (165 lb)

Sport
- Sport: Boxing
- Club: Tanarul Dinamovist; Dinamo Bucharest
- Coached by: Traian Ogrinjeanu; Constantin Nour
Medal record
Representing Romania
Romania National Amateur Boxing Championships
| Gold medal – first place | 1960 Bucharest | -75 kg |
| Gold medal – first place | 1961 Bucharest | -75 kg |
| Gold medal – first place | 1962 Bucharest | -75 kg |
| Gold medal – first place | 1963 Bucharest | -75 kg |
| Gold medal – first place | 1964 Bucharest | -75 kg |
| Gold medal – first place | 1965 Bucharest | -81 kg |
| Gold medal – first place | 1966 Bucharest | -81 kg |
| Gold medal – first place | 1967 Bucharest | -81 kg |
| Gold medal – first place | 1968 Bucharest | -81 kg |
| Gold medal – first place | 1969 Bucharest | -81 kg |
| Gold medal – first place | 1971 Bucharest | -81 kg |
Olympic Games
| Bronze medal – third place | 1960 Rome | -75 kg |
| Silver medal – second place | 1968 Mexico City | -81 kg |
European Championships
| Silver medal – second place | 1963 Moscow | -75 kg |
| Bronze medal – third place | 1967 Rome | -81 kg |
| Silver medal – second place | 1969 Bucharest | -81 kg |

Ion Monea (30 November 1940 – 1 March 2011) was a Romanian amateur boxer. He competed as a middleweight in 1960–64 and won a bronze medal at the 1960 Olympics and a silver medal at the 1963 European Championships, placing fifth at the 1964 Olympics. He then moved up to the light-heavyweight division and won three more medals, at the 1967 and 1969 European championships and 1968 Olympics, losing on all three occasions to Danas Pozniakas. He did not fight Pozniakas in 1968 though, as he had a broken nose from his previous bout and withdrew from the Olympic final.

Monea was trained by Constantin Nour, whom he called the "most competent and gifted trainer". After retiring from competitions he also worked as a boxing coach at Dinamo Bucharest. His trainees included Daniel Dumitrescu and Rudel Obreja.

== 1964 Olympic results ==
Below is the record of Ion Monea, a Romanian middleweight boxer who competed at the 1964 Tokyo Olympics:

- Round of 32: bye
- Round of 16: defeated Kim Deok-pal (South Korea) by decision, 5-0
- Quarterfinal: lost to Emil Schulz (Unified Team of Germany) by decision, 0-5
