= Jonas Čepulis =

Lithuanian boxer (1939–2015)

Personal information
- Born: 11 August 1939 Joniškėlis, Lithuania
- Died: 28 May 2015 (aged 75) Kaunas, Lithuania
- Height: 185 cm (6 ft 1 in)
- Weight: 92 kg (203 lb)

Sport
- Sport: Boxing
- Club: Žalgiris Kaunas
Medal record
Representing the Soviet Union
Olympic Games
Silver medal – second place	1968 Mexico City	Heavyweight

Jonas Čepulis (11 August 1939 – 28 May 2015) was a Soviet and Lithuanian amateur heavyweight boxer who won a silver medal at the 1968 Olympics. He won his first three bouts by technical knockout (TKO), and lost in the finals by TKO to George Foreman.

Čepulis never won a Soviet title, placing second-third in 1965–66 and 1968 and therefore was not selected for the world and European championships. He won Lithuanian titles in 1963–1964, 1966–1967 and 1969–1970 and retired in 1970 with a record of 203 wins out of 230 bouts. He later worked at a Pergalės factory in Kaunas.

In episode 3 of season two of Better Late Than Never the family of Čepulis has a reunion with George Foreman.

== Media portrayals ==
Čepulis was played by Philip Craddock in the film Big George Foreman (2023).
