= Georgi Stankov =

Bulgarian boxer

Medal record

Men's Boxing

Representing Bulgaria

Olympic Games
Bronze medal – third place	1968 Mexico City	Light-heavyweight

Georgi Stankov (born 10 August 1943 in Kosharevo, Bulgaria) is a boxer from Bulgaria. He competed for Bulgaria in the 1968 Summer Olympics held in Mexico City, Mexico in the light-heavyweight event where he finished in third place. He returned to the Olympics four years later in Munich but lost in the first round.
