= Stanisław Dragan =

Polish boxer

Medal record

Men's Boxing

Representing Poland

Olympic Games
Bronze medal – third place	1968 Mexico City	Light-heavyweight

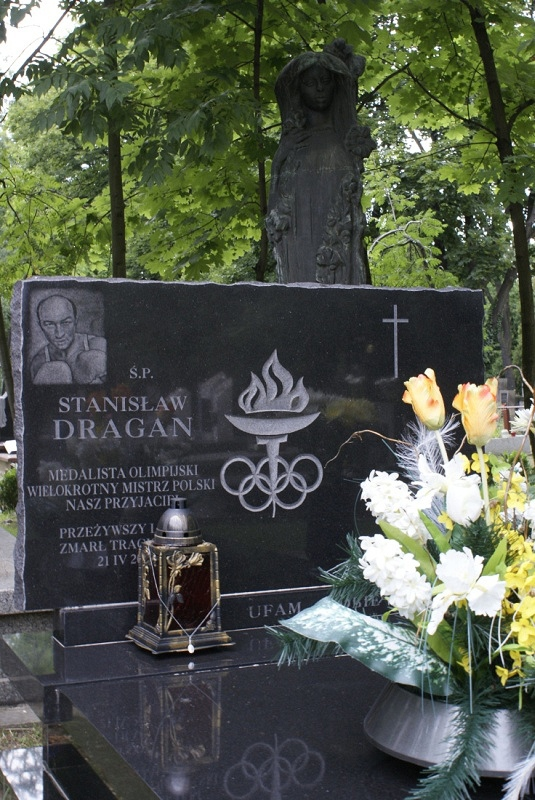

Stanisław Dragan (21 November 1941 in Sadkowa Góra, Poland – 21 April 2007 in Kasinka Mała, Poland) was a Polish boxer.

He competed for Poland in the 1968 Summer Olympics held in Mexico City, Mexico in the light-heavyweight event where he finished in third place.
