= Joseph Donovan (boxer) =

Australian boxer (1949-2001)

Personal information
- Nickname: Prince of Stuarts Point / Smithtown Whirlwind
- Nationality: Australian
- Born: 2 November 1949 (age 76) Kempsey, New South Wales, Australia
- Weight: 48 kg (106 lb) light-flyweight

Boxing career
- Stance: orthodox boxer

Joseph James Donovan (2 November 1949 – 27 November 2001) was an Indigenous Australian amateur boxer who competed at the 1968 Mexico Olympics in the light-flyweight division. Joey's first round opponent, who he defeated when the referee stopped the contest, was Hungarian György Gedó. Gedó went on to win the gold medal in the same division in Munich 1972. The sporting complex in his home town of Stuarts Point, NSW, is named in his honour. Donovan is the great-uncle of rugby league players Greg Inglis and Albert Kelly.
