= Jürgen Schlegel =

German boxer

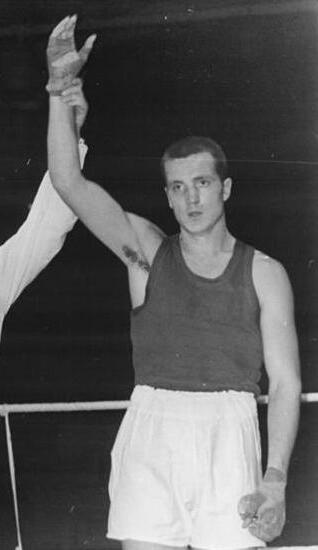
- Schlegel in 1964

Personal information
- Born: 3 October 1940 (age 84); Danzig, Germany

Sport
- Sport: Boxing

Jürgen Schlegel (born 3 October 1940) is a German boxer. He competed at the 1964 Summer Olympics and the 1968 Summer Olympics. At the 1964 Summer Olympics, he defeated Henry Mugwanya of Uganda before losing to Cosimo Pinto of Italy.
