= Giuseppe Mura =

Italian boxer (born 1943)

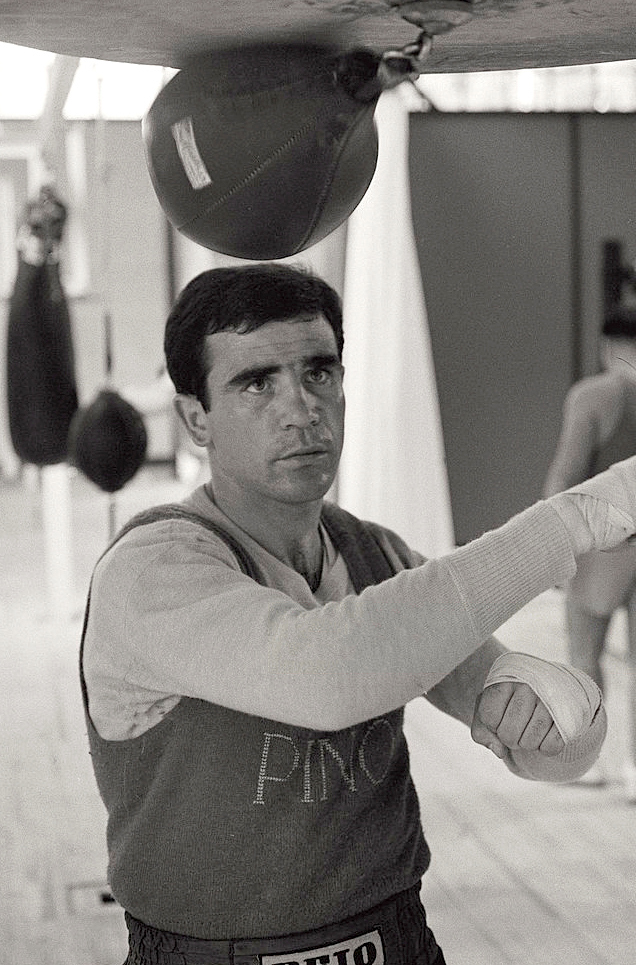
- Giuseppe Mura at the 1968 Olympics

Personal information
- Nationality: Italy
- Born: 6 November 1943 (age 82) Porto Torres, Sassari, Italy
- Height: 1.63 m (5 ft 4 in)
- Weight: Bantamweight

Boxing career

Boxing record
- Total fights: 25
- Wins: 22
- Win by KO: 10
- Losses: 2
- Draws: 1
Medal record
Representing Italy
Mediterranean Games
Gold medal – first place	1967 Tunis	-54 kg

Giuseppe Mura (born 6 November 1943) is a retired Italian boxer who won a gold medal at the 1967 Mediterranean Games in the bantamweight category. Next year he competed at the Mexico Olympics, but was eliminated in the third round by the eventual bronze medalist Samuel Mbugua. After the Olympics he turned professional, and won a national super featherweight title in August 1975. He lost it in December 1975 and retired from boxing.
