= Gabriel Ogun =

Nigerian boxer

Personal information
- Nationality: Nigerian
- Born: 10 June 1946 (age 78); Lagos, Nigeria

Sport
- Sport: Boxing

Gabriel Ogun (born 10 June 1946) is a Nigerian boxer. He competed in the men's light flyweight event at the 1968 Summer Olympics.
