= Soungalo Bagayogo =

Malian boxer (1941–2012)

Personal information
- Nationality: Malian
- Born: 15 June 1941; Mali
- Died: 10 May 2012 (aged 70); Bamako, Mali

Sport
- Sport: Boxing

Soungalo Bagayogo (15 June 1941 – 10 May 2012) was a Malian boxer. He competed in the men's light heavyweight event at the 1968 Summer Olympics. In December 2011, he was designated by Mali's National Olympic Committee as a stakeholder in the development of sport in his home country.
