= Hubert Skrzypczak =

Polish boxer (1943–2025)

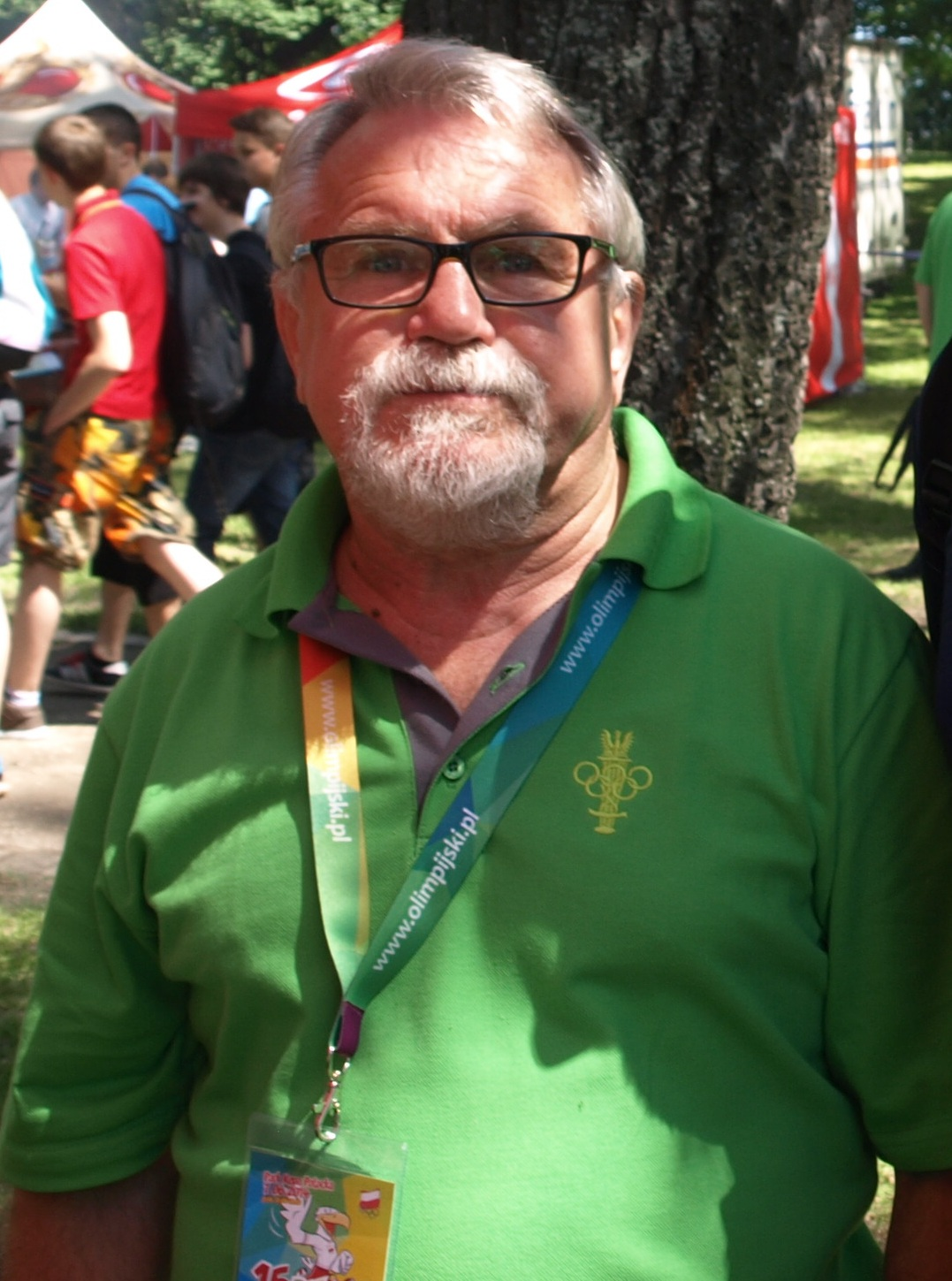

Boxing career
Medal record
Men's Boxing
Representing Poland
Olympic Games
Bronze medal – third place	1968 Mexico City	Light flyweight
European Amateur Championships
Silver medal – second place	1965 East Berlin	Flyweight
Gold medal – first place	1967 Rome	Flyweight

Hubert Zenon Skrzypczak (29 September 1943 – 10 November 2025) was a Polish boxer. He competed for Poland in the 1968 Summer Olympics held in Mexico City, Mexico in the light flyweight event where he finished in third place. Skrzypczak was born in Wejherowo on 29 September 1943, and died on 10 November 2025, at the age of 82.
