= Valerian Sokolov =

Russian boxer

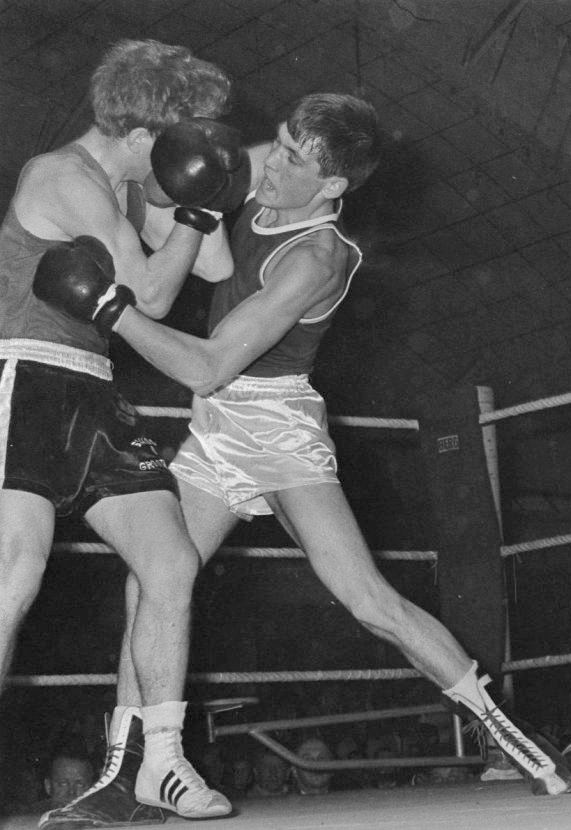
- Valerian Sokolov (right) against Jan Huppen in 1968

Personal information
- Born: 23 November 1947 (age 78) Shikhobylovo, Urmarsky District, Chuvash ASSR, Soviet Union
- Height: 1.70 m (5 ft 7 in)
- Weight: 54 kg (119 lb)

Sport
- Sport: Boxing
- Club: Dynamo Cheboksary
Medal record
Olympic Games
Gold medal – first place	1968 Mexico City	Bantamweight

Valerian Sergeevich Sokolov (Russian: Валериан Серге́евич Соколов; born 30 August 1946) is a former Soviet bantamweight Olympic-class boxer who won the gold medal at the 1968 Summer Games. He trained at Dynamo in Cheboksary. Sokolov became the Honoured Master of Sports of the USSR in 1968 and was awarded the Order of the Badge of Honor in 1969. During his career he won 196 fights out of 216.

Sokolov started boxing in a club in 1963 and was unknown before 1968, when he suddenly won the national and Olympic titles. He proceeded to win Soviet championships in 1969, 1971 and 1973, finishing second in 1972, 1974 and 1975, but had no success internationally. He retired in 1975, and three years later graduated from the Leningrad Military Institute of Physical Culture with a degree in pedagogy. Between 1981 and 1986 he coached the Soviet national team; in 1998 he became chairman of the Coaches Committee of the Russian Boxing Federation, and later was responsible for martial arts at the Federal Agency for Sport in Russia.

== 1968 Olympic results ==
- Round of 64: bye
- Round of 32: Defeated Rafael Archundia (Ecuador) by decision, 3-2
- Round of 16: Defeated Michael Carter (Great Britain) referee stopped contest
- Quarterfinal: Defeated Samuel Mbugua (Kenya) by decision, 5–0
- Semifinal: Defeated Eiji Marioka (Japan) by decision, 5–0
- Final: Defeated Eridadi Mukwanga (Uganda) TKO (was awarded gold medal)
