= Mariano Pérez (boxer) =

Spanish boxer (1948–2016)

Personal information
- Nationality: Spanish
- Born: 8 October 1948; Melilla, Spain
- Died: 24 December 2016 (aged 68)

Sport
- Sport: Boxing

Mariano Pérez (8 October 1948 – 24 December 2016) was a Spanish boxer. He competed in the men's light welterweight event at the 1968 Summer Olympics.
