= Roberto Cervantes =

Mexican boxer (born 1948)

Personal information
- Born: 27 February 1948 (age 77); Mexico City, Mexico

Sport
- Sport: Boxing

Roberto Cervantes (born 27 February 1948) is a Mexican boxer. He competed in the men's bantamweight event at the 1968 Summer Olympics.
