= Kiril Pandov (boxer) =

Bulgarian boxer

- Pandov in 1969

Personal information
- Nationality: Bulgarian
- Born: May 3, 1943 Ksanti, Bulgaria
- Died: June 3, 2013 Plovdiv, Bulgaria

Sport
- Sport: Boxing

Kiril Pandov (born 3 May 1943) is a Bulgarian boxer. He competed at the 1964 Summer Olympics and the 1968 Summer Olympics. At the 1964 Summer Olympics, he lost to Vasile Mariuţan of Romania in the Round of 16.
