= Horst Rascher =

German boxer

Personal information
- Nationality: German
- Born: 11 March 1940 (age 85); Vienna, Reichsgaue of the Ostmark, Nazi Germany (present-day Austria)

Sport
- Sport: Boxing

Horst Rascher (born 11 March 1940) is a German boxer. He competed at the 1960 Summer Olympics and the 1968 Summer Olympics.
