= Jee Yong-ju =

Korean male boxer

Medal record

Men's boxing

Representing South Korea

Olympic Games
Silver medal – second place	1968 Mexico City	Light flyweight

Asian Games
Gold medal – first place	1970 Bangkok	Flyweight

Jee Yong-Ju (Korean: 지용주; Hanja: 地龍珠; December 19, 1948 – August 25, 1985) was an amateur boxer from South Korea. He was born in Wonju, Gangwon-do, South Korea.

He competed for South Korea in the 1968 Summer Olympics held in Mexico City, Mexico in the light flyweight event where he finished in second place.

On August 20, 1985, Jee was stabbed in the stomach by his neighbor after an altercation in his home town, Wonju, and died due to excessive bleeding five days later.

== 1968 Olympic results ==
Below are the results of Jee Yong-ju of South Korea who competed in the light flyweight division of the 1968 Olympic boxing tournament in Mexico City:

- Round of 32: defeated Douglas Ogada (Uganda) by TKO - Rd. 2
- Round of 16: defeated Viktor Zaporozhets (Soviet Union) by decision, 3-2
- Quarterfinal: defeated Alberto Morales (Mexico) by decision, 3-2
- Semifinal: defeated Hubert Skrzypczak (Poland) by decision, 4-1
- Final: lost to Francisco Rodriguez (Venezuela) by decision, 2-3 (was awarded silver medal)
