= Bulgaria at the 1968 Summer Olympics =

- IOC code: BUL
- NOC: Bulgarian Olympic Committee

in Mexico City
- Competitors: 112 (102 men and 10 women) in 13 sports
- Flag bearer: Prodan Gardzhev
- Medals Ranked 18th: Gold 2 Silver 4 Bronze 3 Total 9

Summer Olympics appearances (overview)
- 1896; 1900–1920; 1924; 1928; 1932; 1936; 1948; 1952; 1956; 1960; 1964; 1968; 1972; 1976; 1980; 1984; 1988; 1992; 1996; 2000; 2004; 2008; 2012; 2016; 2020; 2024; 2028

Bulgaria competed at the 1968 Summer Olympics in Mexico City, Mexico. 112 competitors, 102 men and 10 women, took part in 69 events in 13 sports.

== Medalists ==
Medal	Name	Sport	Event	Date
Gold	Petar Kirov	Wrestling	Men's Greco-Roman flyweight	26 October
Gold	Boyan Radev	Wrestling	Men's Greco-Roman light heavyweight	26 October
Silver	Enyu Todorov	Wrestling	Men's freestyle featherweight	20 October
Silver	Enyu Valchev	Wrestling	Men's freestyle lightweight	20 October
Silver	Osman Duraliev	Wrestling	Men's freestyle heavyweight	20 October
Silver	Tsvetan Dimitrov, Yancho Dimitrov, Asparukh Donev, Milko Gaydarski, Ivailo Georgiyev, Atanas Gerov, Mikhail Gionin, Georgi Ivanov, Kiril Ivkov, Atanas Khristov, Georgi Khristakiev, Kiril Khristov, Todor Nikolov, Georgi Vasiliev, Yevgeny Yanchovsky, Stoyan Yordanov, Ivan Zafirov, and Petar Zhekov	Football (soccer)	Men's Team Competition	26 October
Bronze	Prodan Gardzhev	Wrestling	Men's freestyle middleweight	20 October
Bronze	Ivan Mihailov	Boxing	Men's featherweight	24 October
Bronze	Georgi Stankov	Boxing	Men's light heavyweight	24 October

== Athletics ==
Men
Track & road events

Athlete	Event	Heat		Quarterfinal		Semifinal		Final	
Athlete	Event	Result	Rank	Result	Rank	Result	Rank	Result	Rank
Ivailo Sharankov	Marathon	—N/a						2:39:49	30
Nikola Simeonov	Marathon	—N/a						2:48:30	42
Mikhail Zhelev	3000 m steeplechase	9:01.96	2 Q	—N/a				8:58.41	6

Field events

Athlete	Event	Qualification		Final	
Athlete	Event	Distance	Position	Distance	Position
Georgi Stoykovski	Triple jump	16.24	6 Q	16.46	9

Combined events – Decathlon

Athlete	Event	100 m	LJ	SP	HJ	400 m	100H	DT	PV	JT	1500 m	Final	Rank
Spas Dzhurov	Result	10.95	7.40	13.99	1.89	50.28	15.17	40.90	3.60	47.04	5:15.58	7173	15
Spas Dzhurov	Points	872	910	728	705	802	829	683	509	545	328	7173	15

Women
Track & road events

Athlete	Event	Heat		Quarterfinal		Semifinal		Final	
Athlete	Event	Result	Rank	Result	Rank	Result	Rank	Result	Rank
Snezhana Yurukova	80 m hurdles	11.0	6	Did not advance					

Field events

Athlete	Event	Qualification		Final	
Athlete	Event	Distance	Position	Distance	Position
Yordanka Blagoeva	High jump	1.68	17 Q	Did not advance	
Ivanka Khristova	Shot Put	—N/a		17.25	6
Katya Lazova	High jump	1.68	18 Q	Did not advance	

Combined events – Pentathlon

Athlete	Event	80H	SP	HJ	LJ	200 m	Final	Rank
Snezhana Yurukova	Result	11.0	11.83	1.59	5.98	25.1	4728	14
Snezhana Yurukova	Points	1044	843	934	984	923	4728	14

== Basketball ==
=== Group B ===
Qualified for the semifinals

Team	W	L	PF	PA	PD	Pts
Soviet Union	7	0	642	408	+234	14
Brazil	6	1	561	418	+143	13
Mexico	5	2	493	443	+50	12
Poland	4	3	473	504	−31	11
Bulgaria	3	4	456	478	−22	10
Cuba	2	5	514	532	−18	9
South Korea	1	6	453	530	−77	8
Morocco	0	7	355	634	−279	7

October 13

Cuba	61–70	Bulgaria

Palacio de los Deportes, Mexico City

October 14

Brazil	75–59	Bulgaria

Palacio de los Deportes, Mexico City

October 15

Morocco	59–77	Bulgaria

Palacio de los Deportes, Mexico City

October 16

Soviet Union	81–56	Bulgaria

Palacio de los Deportes, Mexico City

October 18

Mexico	73–63	Bulgaria

Palacio de los Deportes, Mexico City

October 19

Bulgaria	67–69	Poland

Palacio de los Deportes, Mexico City

October 20

Bulgaria	64–60	South Korea

Palacio de los Deportes, Mexico City

=== 9th–12th Place ===
October 23

Bulgaria	83–79	Panama

Palacio de los Deportes, Mexico City

=== 9th–10th Place ===
October 24

Bulgaria	57–67	Puerto Rico

Palacio de los Deportes, Mexico City

== Boxing ==
Men

Athlete	Event	1 Round	2 Round	3 Round	Quarterfinals	Semifinals	Final	
Athlete	Event	Opposition Result	Opposition Result	Opposition Result	Opposition Result	Opposition Result	Opposition Result	Rank
Stefan Aleksandrov	Light Flyweight	BYE	Gabriel Ogun (NIG); L 1–4	Did not advance				
Nikola Savov	Bantamweight	Godfrey Mwamba (ZAM); W RSC	Fermín Espinosa (CUB); W RSC	Chang Kyou-chul (KOR); L RSC	Did not advance			
Ivan Mihailov	Featherweight	Jan Wadas (POL); W 4–1	Nils-Dag Stromme (NOR); W 5–0	—N/a	Seyfi Tatar (TUR); W 3–2	Al Robinson (USA); L 0–5	Did not advance	Bronze medal
Stoiane Pilitchev	Lightweight	BYE	Bayu Ayele (ETH); W 5–0	Antonio Durán (MEX); W 4–1	Calistrat Cuțov (ROU); L 1–4	Did not advance		
Petar Stoitchev	Light Welterweight	BYE	Ali Kilicoglu (TUR); W 5–0	Vaselinovic Ljubinko (YUG); W 4–1	Arto Nilsson (FIN); L RSC	Did not advance		
Ivan Kiriakov	Welterweight	BYE	Bohumil Němeček (TCH); W DSQ-3	Celal Sandal (TUR); L RSC	Did not advance			
Simon Georgiev	Middleweight	Mario Casati (ITA); W 4–1	BYE	—N/a	Alfred Jones (USA); L 1–4	Did not advance		
Georgi Stankov	Light heavyweight	BYE	Arthur Redden (ITA); W 4–1	—N/a	Bernard Malherbe (FRA); W 5–0	Danas Pozniakas (URS); L 0–5	Did not advance	Bronze medal
Kiril Pandov	Heavyweight	Milos Petar (YUG); W 3–2	—N/a		Giorgio Bambini (ITA); L 0–5	Did not advance		

== Canoeing ==
=== Sprint ===
Men

Athlete	Event	Heats		Repechages		Semifinals		Final	
Athlete	Event	Time	Rank	Time	Rank	Time	Rank	Time	Rank
Boris Lyubenov	C-1 1000 m	4:36.2	5 Q	—N/a		4:35.82	2 Q	4:43.43	5
Ivan Valov; Aleksandar Damyanov	C-2 1000 m	4:26.1	4 Q	BYE		4:22.17	3 Q	4:22.89	8

== Football ==
=== Group D ===
Team	Pld	W	D	L	GF	GA	GD	Pts
Bulgaria	3	2	1	0	11	3	+8	5
Guatemala	3	2	0	1	6	3	+3	4
Czechoslovakia	3	1	1	1	10	3	+7	3
Thailand	3	0	0	3	1	19	−18	0

1968-10-14
12:00

Bulgaria	7 – 0	Thailand
Gyonin 25'; Zhekov 55'; Mihaylov 56' 61'; Zafirov 73'; Nikodimov 85'; Ivkov 88'	Report

Estadio Nou Camp, León
Referee: Guillermo Velasquez (Colombia)

1968-10-16
12:00

Bulgaria	2 – 2	Czechoslovakia
Georgiev 44'; Zhekov 77'	Report	Jarabinský 25'; Petráš 42'

Estadio Jalisco, Guadalajara
Referee: Abel Aguilar Elizalde (Mexico)

1968-10-18
12:00

Bulgaria	2 – 1	Guatemala
Nikodimov 50'; Zhekov 84'	Report	López Oliva 88'

Estadio Nou Camp, León
Referee: Raúl Osorio (Mexico)

=== Quarter-finals ===
1968-10-20
12:00

Bulgaria	1 – 1	Israel
Hristakiev 5'	Report	Feigenbaum 89'

Estadio Nou Camp, León
Referee: Michel Kitabdjian (France)

Bulgaria progressed after a drawing of lots.

=== Semi-finals ===
22 October 1968
12:00

Mexico	2–3	Bulgaria
Morales 39'; Pulido Rodríguez 48'	Report	Zhekov 8'; Mihaylov 9'; Veselinov 58'

Estadio Jalisco, Guadalajara
Referee: Seyoum Tarekegn (Ethiopia)

=== Gold Medal match ===
1968-10-26
12:00

Hungary	4 – 1	Bulgaria
Menczel 40'; A. Dunai 41' 49'; Juhász 62'	Report	Veselinov 22'

Azteca Stadium, Mexico City
Attendance: 75,000
Referee: Diego De Leo (Mexico)

== Modern pentathlon ==
Three male pentathletes represented Bulgaria in 1968.

Men's Individual Competition:

- Antoni Panyovski – 4247 points (→ 33rd place)
- Konstantin Sardzhev – 4191 points (→ 36th place)
- Ivan Apostolov – 3462 points (→ 45th place)

Men's Team Competition:

- Paniowsky, Sardjev, and Apostolov – 11976 points (→ 11th place)

== Rowing ==
Men

Athlete	Event	Heats		Repechage		Semifinals		Final	
Athlete	Event	Time	Rank	Time	Rank	Time	Rank	Time	Rank
Atanas Zelev; Yordan Valtchev	Double sculls	6:54.16	1 Q	BYE		7:12.08	2 Q	6:58.48	4
Georgi Atanasov; Georgi Nikolov; Veselin Staievski	Coxed pair	8:11.13	1 Q	BYE		8:06.41	5 FB	7:58.10	8

== Shooting ==
Six shooters, all men, represented Bulgaria in 1968.

Open

Athlete	Event	Final	
Athlete	Event	Score	Rank
Dencho Denev	50 m pistol	545	24
Dencho Denev	25 m rapid fire pistol	579	28
Martsel Koen	50 m rifle three positions	1142	21
Martsel Koen	50 m rifle prone	592	24
Anton Manolov	Skeet	180	40
Atanas Tasev	Skeet	185	34
Velichko Velichkov	50 m rifle prone	584	64
Emiliyan Vergov	50 m rifle three positions	1119	45

== Swimming ==
Men

Athlete	Event	Heat		Semifinal		Final	
Athlete	Event	Time	Rank	Time	Rank	Time	Rank
Angel Chakarov	200 m individual medley	2:24.0	26	—N/a		Did not advance	
Angel Chakarov	400 m individual medley	5:10.9	17	—N/a		Did not advance	
Yulyan Rusev	200 m individual medley	2:22.7	21	—N/a		Did not advance	
Yulyan Rusev	400 m individual medley	5:07.0	12	—N/a		Did not advance	

Women

Athlete	Event	Heat		Semifinal		Final	
Athlete	Event	Time	Rank	Time	Rank	Time	Rank
Mariya Nikolova	100 metre freestyle	1:05.1	=32	Did not advance			
Mariya Nikolova	200 m individual medley	2:40.8	18	—N/a		Did not advance	
Mariya Nikolova	400 m individual medley	5:45.2	15	—N/a		Did not advance	

== Volleyball ==
=== Round robin ===
Pos	Team	Pld	W	L	Pts	SW	SL	SR	SPW	SPL	SPR
1	Soviet Union	9	8	1	17	26	8	3.250	464	326	1.423
2	Japan	9	7	2	16	24	6	4.000	430	258	1.667
3	Czechoslovakia	9	7	2	16	22	15	1.467	454	417	1.089
4	East Germany	9	6	3	15	22	12	1.833	449	374	1.201
5	Poland	9	6	3	15	18	11	1.636	371	281	1.320
6	Bulgaria	9	4	5	13	16	17	0.941	379	385	0.984
7	United States	9	4	5	13	15	18	0.833	383	414	0.925
8	Belgium	9	2	7	11	6	24	0.250	239	417	0.573
9	Brazil	9	1	8	10	8	25	0.320	357	469	0.761
10	Mexico	9	0	9	9	6	27	0.222	289	474	0.610

Date		Score		Set 1	Set 2	Set 3	Set 4	Set 5	Total
13 Oct	Bulgaria	3–0	Mexico	15–9	15–4	15–6			45–19
16 Oct	Bulgaria	3–0	Belgium	15–10	15–1	15–5			45–16
17 Oct	Soviet Union	3–0	Bulgaria	15–10	15–9	15–10			45–29
19 Oct	Bulgaria	3–2	United States	10–15	17–15	7–15	15–7	16–14	65–66
20 Oct	Bulgaria	3–0	Brazil	15–8	18–16	15–3			48–27
21 Oct	Czechoslovakia	3–2	Bulgaria	15–7	10–15	15–9	4–15	15–7	59–53
23 Oct	Poland	3–0	Bulgaria	15–3	15–5	15–10			45–18
24 Oct	East Germany	3–2	Bulgaria	15–11	8–15	15–10	10–15	15–7	63–58
25 Oct	Japan	3–0	Bulgaria	15–7	15–6	15–5			45–18

== Weightlifting ==
Men

Athlete	Event	Military press		Snatch		Clean & Jerk		Total	Rank
Athlete	Event	Result	Rank	Result	Rank	Result	Rank	Total	Rank
Atanas Kiroy	56 kg	105	8	100	7	130	7	335	7
Mladen Kuchev	60 kg	115	8	107.5	7	135	10	357.5	9
Petar Yanev	60 kg	NVL	AC	DNS		DNS		DNF	
Kostadin Tilev	67,5 kg	132.5	4	115	12	150	10	397.5	8
Rilko Florov	67,5 kg	117.5	13	120	8	147.5	12	385	12
