= Boxing at the 1968 Summer Olympics – Light welterweight =

Boxing competitions

The light welterweight class in the boxing competition was the sixth-lowest weight class. Light welterweights were limited to those boxers weighing a maximum of 63.5 kilograms (139.9 lbs). 35 boxers qualified for this category. Like all Olympic boxing events, the competition was a straight single-elimination tournament. Both semifinal losers were awarded bronze medals, so no boxers competed again after their first loss. Bouts consisted of six rounds each. Five judges scored each bout.

== Medalists ==
Gold	Jerzy Kulej; Poland
Silver	Enrique Regüeiferos; Cuba
Bronze	Arto Nilsson; Finland
Bronze	Jim Wallington; United States

== Schedule ==
Date	Round
Sunday, October 13, 1968	First round
Friday, October 18, 1968	Second round
Monday, October 21, 1968	Third round
Wednesday, October 23, 1968	Quarterfinals
Thursday, October 24, 1968	Semifinals
Saturday, October 26, 1968	Final Bout

== Draw ==
=== Finals ===
Semifinals		Final
Jerzy Kulej (POL)	5
Arto Nilsson (FIN)	0	Jerzy Kulej (POL)	3
Jim Wallington (USA)	1	Enrique Regüeiferos (CUB)	2
Enrique Regüeiferos (CUB)	4

=== Top half ===
First round
Giambattista Capretti (ITA)	RSC
Richard Findlay (CAN)

Second round
Jerzy Kulej (POL)	3
Janos Kadji (HUN)	2
Giambattista Capretti (ITA)	5
Carlos Casal (URU)	0
Jaime Lozano (MEX)	5
Emmanuel Lawson (GHA)	0
Peter Tiepold (GDR)	5
Vladimir Kucera (TCH)	0
Ljubinko Veselinović (YUG)	3
Samuel Valencia (ECU)	2
Petar Stoychev (BUL)	5
Ali Kılıçoğlu (TUR)	0
Gert Puzicha (FRG)	5
Jim McCourt (IRL)	0
Arto Nilsson (FIN)	5
John Olulu (KEN)	0

Third round
Jerzy Kulej (POL)	4
Gianbattista Capretti (ITA)	1
Jaime Lozano (MEX)	0
Peter Tiepold (GDR)	5
Vaselinovic Ljubinko (YUG)	1
Petar Stoitchev (BUL)	4
Gert Puzicha (FRG)	2
Arto Nilsson (FIN)	3

Quarterfinals
Jerzy Kulej (POL)	3
Peter Tiepold (GDR)	2
Petar Stoitchev (BUL)
Arto Nilsson (FIN)	RSC

Semifinals
Jerzy Kulej (POL)	5
Arto Nilsson (FIN)	0

=== Bottom half ===
First round
Enrique Regüefeiros (CUB)	RSC
Terence Waller (GBR)
Antoniu Vasile (ROU)	KO-1
Ernest Dong (CMR)
Habib Galhia (TUN)	5
Adalberto Siebens (PUR)	0

Second round
Nelson Ruiz (VEN)	3
Niyom Prasertsom (THA)	2
Kim Sa-yong (KOR)	3
Enrique González (CHI)	2
Jim Wallington (USA)	RSC
Donato Cartagena (DOM)
Alex Odhiambo (UGA)	RSC
Mariano Pérez (ESP)
Issaka Dabore (NIG)	5
Isaac Marin (CRC)	0
Yevgeny Frolov (URS)	5
Raymond Maguire (AUS)	0
Enrique Regüeiferos (CUB)	Bye
Antoniu Vasile (ROU)	w/o
Habib Galhia (TUN)

Third round
Nelson Ruiz (VEN)	1
Kim Sa-young (KOR)	4
Jim Wallington (USA)	5
Alex Odhiambo (UGA)	0
Issaka Dabore (NIG)	1
Yevgeny Frolov (URS)	4
Enrique Regüeiferos (CUB)	RSC
Antoniu Vasile (ROU)

Quarterfinals
Kim Sa-yong (KOR)	0
Jim Wallington (USA)	5
Yevgeny Frolov (URS)	2
Enrique Regüeiferos (CUB)	3

Semifinals
Jim Wallington (USA)	1
Enrique Regüeiferos (CUB)	4
