= Jerzy Kulej =

Polish boxer & politician (1940–2012)

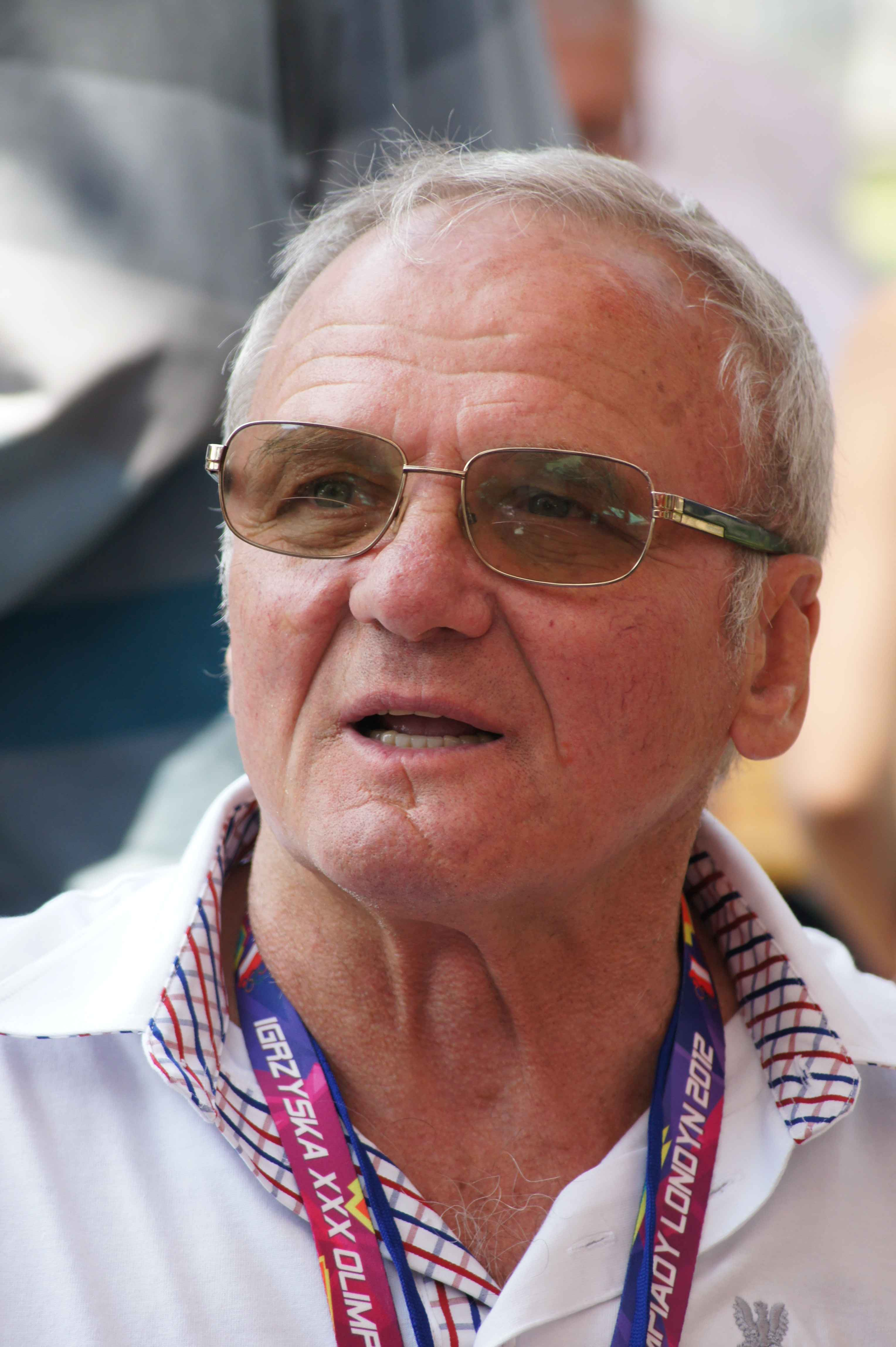
- Jerzy Kulej in 2011

Personal information
- Born: 19 October 1940 Częstochowa, Poland
- Died: 13 July 2012 (aged 71) Warsaw, Poland
- Height: 1.67 m (5 ft 6 in)
- Weight: 66 kg (146 lb)

Sport
- Sport: Boxing
- Weight class: Light welterweight
- Club: Start Częstochowa; Gwardia Warsaw
Medal record
Men's boxing
Representing Poland
Olympic Games
Gold medal – first place	1964 Tokyo	Light welterweight
Gold medal – first place	1968 Mexico City	Light welterweight
European Amateur Championships
Gold medal – first place	1963 Moscow	Light welterweight
Gold medal – first place	1965 East Berlin	Light welterweight
Silver medal – second place	1967 Rome	Light welterweight

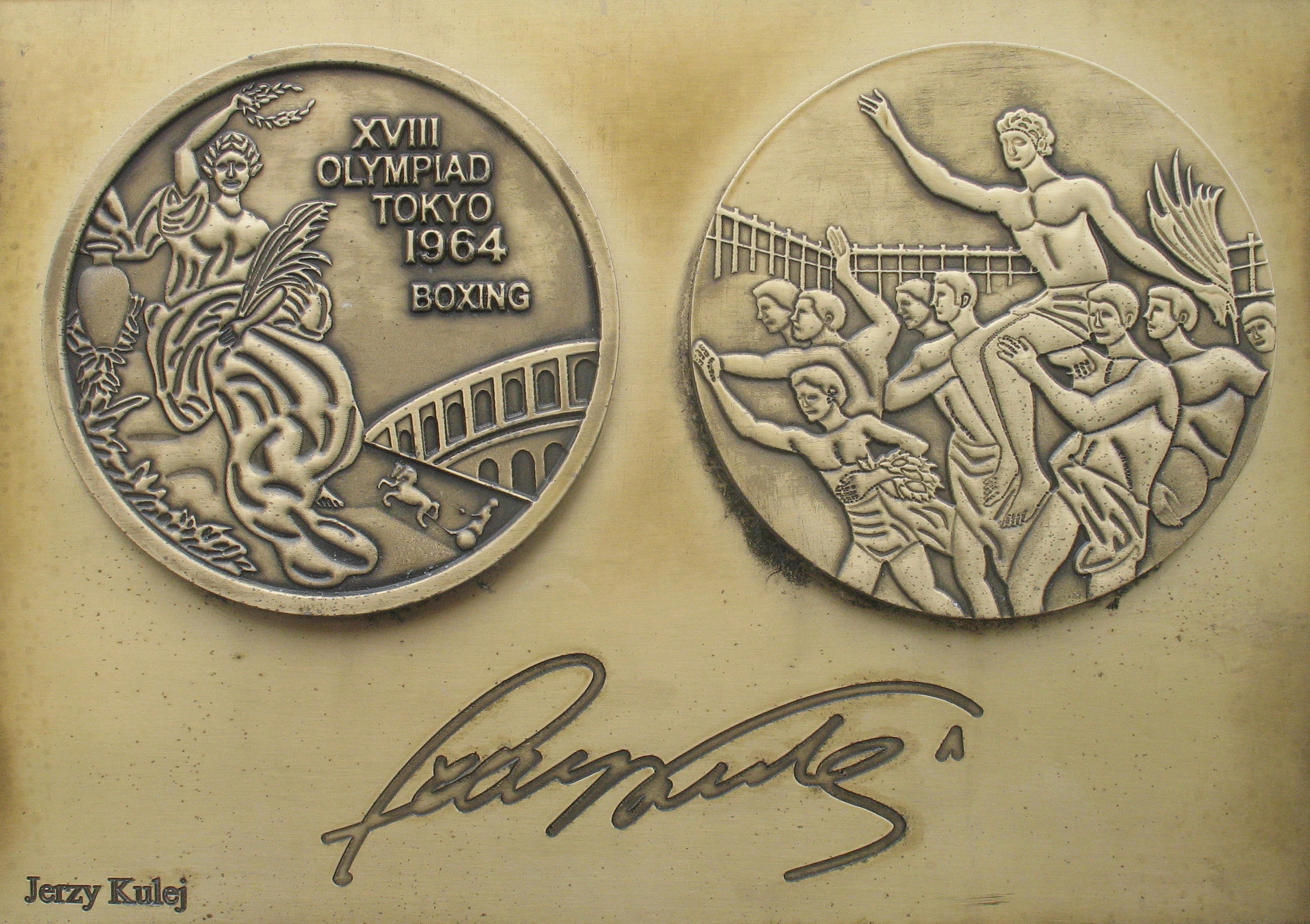
Copy of J. Kulej medal and autograph in Sports Star Avenue in Dziwnów

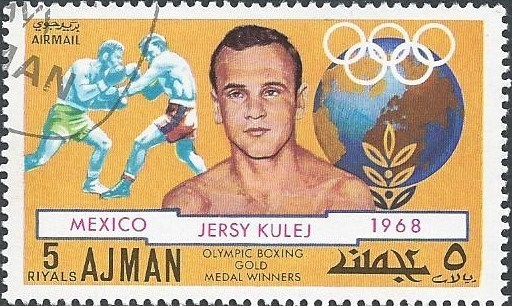
Jerzy Kulej featured on a 1971 stamp

Jerzy Zdzisław Kulej (19 October 1940 – 13 July 2012) was a Polish boxer, politician and sports commentator. He was a two-time Olympic and two-time European Champion.

== Life and career ==
He was born in 1940 in Częstochowa, Poland. He started his boxing career in 1955 in the Start Częstochowa club. In 1958, he joined Poland's national team coached by Feliks Stamm. At the 1964 Summer Olympics, he won a gold medal in the light welterweight division (<63.5 kg) defeating Yevgeny Frolov. In 1968, he defended his title in a close match against a Cuban boxer Enrique Regüeiferos becoming the only Polish boxer to ever win two Olympic gold medals. He also twice won a gold medal at the European Amateur Championships in 1963 and 1965, and won a silver medal in 1967. He had a record of 317 wins, 6 draws and 25 losses.

In 1976, he made an appearance in a movie Przepraszam, czy tu biją? directed by Marek Piwowski. In 1995, he received the Aleksander Reksza Boxing Award.

In 1998, he was awarded the Commander's Cross of the Order of Polonia Restituta by President Aleksander Kwaśniewski for his "outstanding contributions to the Olympic movement, the development and popularization of physical culture as well as sporting achievements".

In his later years, he became a politician representing various parties over the time. In 2001, as a member of Democratic Left Alliance for electoral district of Warsaw he became a member of the Polish parliament (the Sejm) and served to 2005. He was a boxing commentator for Polish TV station Polsat Sport.

== Death ==
In December 2011, he suffered a massive heart attack. While in recovery, he learned that he suffered from an eye melanoma that was, in the end, the direct cause of his death in Warsaw on 13 July 2012 at the age of 71. He was buried on 20 July at the Powązki Military Cemetery in Warsaw.

== Remembrance ==
In 2024, a biopic devoted to the life and career of Kulej entitled Kulej. Dwie strony medalu (Kulej: Two Sides of the Medal) premiered in Paris and was subsequently selected to be shown at the Gdynia Film Festival. It was directed by Xawery Żuławski with Tomasz Włosok playing the role of the main protagonist.

== Olympic results ==
1964 - Tokyo

- Round of 64 – bye
- Round of 32 – Defeated Roberto Amaya (Argentina) by decision, 5–0
- Round of 16 – Defeated Richard McTaggart (Great Britain) by decision, 4–1
- Quarterfinal – Defeated Iosif Mihalic (Romania) by decision, 4–1
- Semifinal – Defeated Eddie Blay (Ghana) by decision, 5–0
- Final – Defeated Yevgeny Frolov (Soviet Union) by decision, 5–0

1968 - Mexico City

- Round of 64 – bye
- Round of 32 – Defeated János Kajdi (Hungary) by decision, 3–2
- Round of 16 – Defeated Giambattista Capretti (Italy) by decision, 4–1
- Quarterfinals – Defeated Peter Tiepold (East Germany) by decision, 3–2
- Semifinals – Defeated Arto Nilsson (Finland) by decision, 5–0
- Final – Defeated Enrique Requeiferos (Cuba) by decision, 3–2

== See also ==
- List of Poles
- Sport in Poland
- Poland at the Olympics
