= 1965 European Amateur Boxing Championships =

Boxing competitions

- Host city: East Berlin
- Country: Germany
- Nations: 24
- Athletes: 172
- Dates: 22–29 May

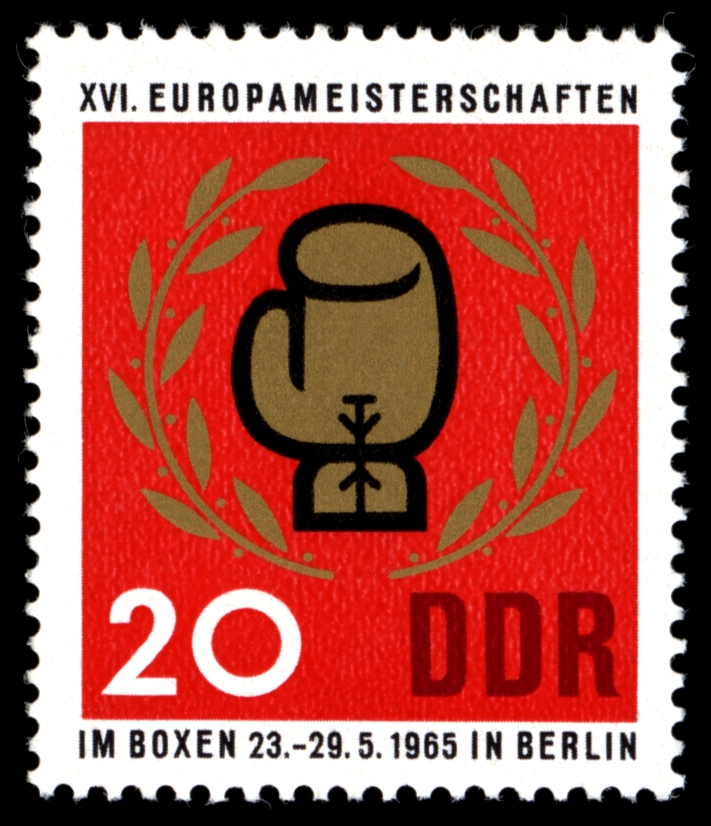
An East German stamp dedicated to the 1965 European Amateur Boxing Championships

The 1965 European Amateur Boxing Championships were held in East Berlin, East Germany from 22 to 29 May. The 16th edition of the bi-annual competition was organised by the European governing body for amateur boxing, EABA. There were 172 fighters from 24 countries participating.

== Medal winners ==
Event	Gold	Silver	Bronze
Flyweight (– 51 kilograms)	Hans Freistadt; West Germany	Hubert Skrzypczak; Poland	Constantin Ciucă; Romania John McCluskey; Scotland
Bantamweight (– 54 kilograms)	Oleg Grigoryev; Soviet Union	Jan Gałązka; Poland	Nicolae Giju; Romania Horst Rascher; West Germany
Featherweight (– 57 kilograms)	Stanislav Stepashkin; Soviet Union	Brunon Bendig; Poland	Ken Buchanan; Scotland Wolfgang Hübner; East Germany
Lightweight (– 60 kilograms)	Velikton Barannikov; Soviet Union	Józef Grudzień; Poland	(Republic of Ireland) Jim McCourt; Ireland Antoniu Vasile; Romania
Light Welterweight (– 63.5 kilograms)	Jerzy Kulej; Poland	Preben Rasmussen; Denmark	Ermanno Fasoli; Italy Rupert König; Austria
Welterweight (– 67 kilograms)	Ričardas Tamulis; Soviet Union	Luigi Patruno; Italy	Detlef Dahn; East Germany Vladimír Kučera; Czechoslovakia
Light Middleweight (– 71 kilograms)	Viktor Ageyev; Soviet Union	Angel Doitchev; Bulgaria	Mario Casati; Italy Anton Schnedl; Austria
Middleweight (– 75 kilograms)	Valeriy Popenchenko; Soviet Union	William Robinson; England	Lucjan Słowakiewicz; Poland Wolfgang Trödler; East Germany
Light Heavyweight (– 81 kilograms)	Danas Pozniakas; Soviet Union	Peter Gerber; West Germany	Bernd Anders; East Germany Béla Horváth; Switzerland
Heavyweight (+ 81 kilograms)	Aleksandr Izosimov; Soviet Union	Kiril Pandov; Bulgaria	Dušan Rybanský; Czechoslovakia Ernő Szénási; Hungary

== Medal table ==
* Host nation (East Germany)

Rank	Nation	Gold	Silver	Bronze	Total
1	Soviet Union (URS)	8	0	0	8
2	Poland (POL)	1	4	1	6
3	West Germany (FRG)	1	1	1	3
4	Bulgaria (BUL)	0	2	0	2
5	Italy (ITA)	0	1	2	3
6	Denmark (DEN)	0	1	0	1
6	England (ENG)	0	1	0	1
8	East Germany (GDR)*	0	0	4	4
9	Romania (ROU)	0	0	3	3
10	Austria (AUT)	0	0	2	2
10	Czechoslovakia (TCH)	0	0	2	2
10	Scotland (SCO)	0	0	2	2
13	Hungary (HUN)	0	0	1	1
13	Ireland (IRL)	0	0	1	1
13	Switzerland (SUI)	0	0	1	1
Totals (15 entries)		10	10	20	40
