= Miguel Velázquez (boxer) =

Spanish boxer

Personal information
- Nationality: Spanish
- Born: Tomás Miguel Velázquez Torres; 27 September 1944 (age 81) Santa Cruz de Tenerife, Canary Islands, Spain
- Height: 5 ft 7 in (170 cm)
- Weight: Lightweight; Light welterweight

Boxing career
- Stance: Orthodox

Boxing record
- Total fights: 73
- Wins: 66
- Win by KO: 33
- Losses: 4
- Draws: 3

Tomás Miguel Velázquez Torres (born 27 September 1944) is a former Spanish boxer at Light Welterweight. He competed in the men's light welterweight event at the 1964 Summer Olympics.

== Olympic games results ==
1964 (as a Light welterweight)

- Lost to Hoji Yonekura (Japan) 2-3

== Professional career ==
Velázquez turned pro in 1966 and captured the WBC light welterweight title in 1976 with a disqualification win over Saensak Muangsurin in his 72nd pro fight. He lost the title later that year in his first defense in a rematch to Muangsurin, via 2nd-round TKO. Velasquez retired after the loss, but had a brief comeback in 1979.

== Professional boxing record ==
73 fights	66 wins	4 losses
By knockout	33	2
By decision	30	2
By disqualification	3	0
Draws	3	

No.	Result	Record	Opponent	Type	Round, time	Date	Location	Notes
73	Loss	66–4–3	Saensak Muangsurin	TKO	2 (15)	1976-10-29	Pabellón del Colegio de Hermanos Maristas, Segovia, Spain	Lost WBC super lightweight title
72	Win	66–3–3	Lothar Abend	KO	3 (10)	1976-08-07	Club Raúl, Lepe, Spain	
71	Win	65–3–3	Saensak Muangsurin	DQ	4 (15)	1976-06-30	Palacio de los Deportes, Madrid, Spain	Won WBC super lightweight title
70	Win	64–3–3	Gualberto Fernandez	PTS	8 (8)	1976-05-01	Palencia, Spain	
69	Win	63–3–3	Gualberto Fernandez	PTS	8 (8)	1976-02-07	Pabellón Deportivo Fernando Portillo, Cadiz, Spain	
68	Win	62–3–3	Abu Arrow	RTD	5 (8)	1976-01-18	Recinto de La Pérgola, Castellón de la Plana, Spain	
67	Win	61–3–3	Gualberto Fernandez	PTS	8 (8)	1975-11-08	Pabellón Municipal, Alicante, Spain	
66	Win	60–3–3	Fernando Bermejo	DQ	6 (8)	1975-11-01	Lyon, France	
65	Win	59–3–3	Fernando Perez	PTS	8 (8)	1975-10-11	Oviedo, Spain	
64	Loss	58–3–3	Jose Ramon Gomez Fouz	PTS	8 (8)	1975-07-23	Campo del Gas, Madrid, Spain	
63	Win	58–2–3	Esperno Postl	PTS	6 (6)	1975-06-24	Deutschlandhalle, Berlin, West Germany	
62	Win	57–2–3	Jeronimo Lucas	DQ	8 (12)	1975-04-26	Plaza de Toros, Santa Cruz de Tenerife, Spain	Won Spanish lightweight title
61	Win	56–2–3	Luciano Laffranchi	PTS	8 (8)	1975-03-22	Plaza de Toros, Santa Cruz de Tenerife, Spain	
60	Win	55–2–3	Giuseppe Minotti	PTS	8 (8)	1975-02-21	Palacio de los Deportes, Madrid, Spain	
59	Win	54–2–3	Luciano Laffranchi	TKO	7 (8)	1975-01-06	Pabellón de La Casilla, Bilbao, Spain	
58	Win	53–2–3	Santino Reali	PTS	8 (8)	1974-12-05	Pabellón de La Casilla, Bilbao, Spain	
57	Win	52–2–3	Toni Navarro	RTD	7 (8)	1974-08-16	Madrid, Spain	
56	Win	51–2–3	Carlos Almeida	TKO	4 (10)	1974-06-22	Plaza de Toros, Valencia, Spain	
55	Win	50–2–3	Ali Issaoui	TKO	6 (8)	1974-06-07	Palacio de los Deportes, Madrid, Spain	
54	Win	49–2–3	Antonio Villasantes	TKO	4 (8)	1972-10-20	Gran Price, Barcelona, Spain	
53	Win	48–2–3	Gualberto Fernandez	TKO	4 (8)	1972-08-01	La Monumental, Barcelona, Spain	
52	Win	47–2–3	Jake Gulino	PTS	10 (10)	1972-06-28	Palacio de los Deportes, Madrid, Spain	
51	Loss	46–2–3	Antonio Puddu	TKO	4 (15)	1971-07-31	Cagliari, Italy	Lost EBU lightweight title
50	Draw	46–1–3	Angel Robinson Garcia	PTS	10 (10)	1971-05-21	Gran Price, Barcelona, Spain	
49	Win	46–1–2	Olli Mäki	PTS	10 (10)	1971-04-29	Palacio de los Deportes, Madrid, Spain	
48	Draw	45–1–2	Antonio Puddu	PTS	15 (15)	1971-01-29	Palacio de los Deportes, Barcelona, Spain	Retained EBU lightweight title
47	Win	45–1–1	Tore Magnussen	TKO	3 (10)	1970-08-22	Valencia, Spain	
46	Win	44–1–1	Eber Jimenez	KO	2 (8)	1970-08-14	Pazo dos Deportes de Riazor, La Coruna, Spain	
45	Win	43–1–1	Angel Neches	PTS	8 (8)	1970-08-01	Plaza de Toros del Chofre, San Sebastian, Spain	
44	Win	42–1–1	Carmelo Coscia	TKO	11 (15)	1970-06-26	Palacio de los Deportes, Madrid, Spain	Retained EBU lightweight title
43	Win	41–1–1	Josue Marquez	PTS	10 (10)	1970-05-22	Palacio de los Deportes, Madrid, Spain	
42	Win	40–1–1	Carlos Almeida	KO	1 (10)	1970-04-11	Plaza de Toros, Santa Cruz de Tenerife, Spain	
41	Win	39–1–1	Ken Buchanan	PTS	15 (15)	1970-01-29	Palacio de los Deportes, Madrid, Spain	Won vacant EBU lightweight title
40	Draw	38–1–1	Chris Fernandez	PTS	10 (10)	1969-12-11	Palacio de los Deportes, Barcelona, Spain	
39	Win	38–1	Luigi Farina	TKO	5 (10)	1969-11-21	Palacio de los Deportes, Madrid, Spain	
38	Win	37–1	Giuseppe Amante	PTS	10 (10)	1969-11-13	Gran Price, Barcelona, Spain	
37	Win	36–1	Larry Flaviano	KO	5 (10)	1969-10-24	Palacio de los Deportes, Madrid, Spain	
36	Win	35–1	Massimo Consolati	PTS	10 (10)	1969-10-16	Gran Price, Barcelona, Spain	
35	Win	34–1	Kouider Meftah	PTS	10 (10)	1969-08-20	Plaza de toros de las Arenas, Barcelona, Spain	
34	Loss	33–1	Pedro Carrasco	PTS	15 (15)	1969-06-13	Palacio de los Deportes, Madrid, Spain	For EBU lightweight title
33	Win	33–0	Tahar Ben Hassen	TKO	7 (10)	1969-04-12	Palacio de los Deportes, Madrid, Spain	
32	Win	32–0	Tomas Castuera	TKO	3 (8)	1969-03-28	Teatro Circo Price, Madrid, Spain	
31	Win	31–0	Angel Neches	PTS	8 (8)	1969-03-18	Plaza de Toros, Valencia, Spain	
30	Win	30–0	Bruno Melissano	PTS	10 (10)	1969-02-01	Plaza de Toros, Santa Cruz de Tenerife, Spain	
29	Win	29–0	Ould Makloufi	PTS	10 (10)	1969-01-25	Santa Cruz de Tenerife, Spain	
28	Win	28–0	Angel Neches	PTS	10 (10)	1968-12-25	Pabellón de La Casilla, Bilbao, Spain	
27	Win	27–0	Miguel A Piriz	TKO	5 (8)	1968-11-30	Santa Cruz de Tenerife, Spain	
26	Win	26–0	Kid Tano	PTS	12 (12)	1968-11-09	Plaza de Toros, Santa Cruz de Tenerife, Spain	Retained Spanish lightweight title
25	Win	25–0	Kid Rainbow	PTS	8 (8)	1968-10-18	Madrid, Spain	
24	Win	24–0	Pierre Tirlo	TKO	2 (8)	1968-10-05	Santa Cruz de Tenerife, Spain	
23	Win	23–0	Fernando Tavares	TKO	3 (10)	1968-09-04	Melilla, Spain	
22	Win	22–0	Manuel Carvajal	TKO	5 (12)	1968-08-16	Plaza de Toros de La Maestranza, Sevilla, Spain	Retained Spanish lightweight title
21	Win	21–0	Karl Furcht	TKO	3 (10)	1968-06-24	Santa Cruz de Tenerife, Spain	
20	Win	20–0	Billy Yussuf	KO	2 (8)	1968-06-15	Santa Cruz de Tenerife, Spain	
19	Win	19–0	Manuel Artiles Medina	TKO	8 (12)	1968-04-27	Salamanca, Spain	Retained Spanish lightweight title
18	Win	18–0	Tomas Castuera	KO	10 (12)	1968-04-04	Frontón Balear, Palma de Mallorca, Spain	Retained Spanish lightweight title
17	Win	17–0	Jose Luis Torcida	PTS	10 (10)	1968-03-14	Gran Price, Barcelona, Spain	
16	Win	16–0	Mohamed ben Amar	PTS	8 (8)	1968-02-22	Frontón Balear, Palma de Mallorca, Spain	
15	Win	15–0	Mariano Serrano	PTS	12 (12)	1968-02-11	Pabellón Municipal de Deportes, Salamanca, Spain	Retained Spanish lightweight title
14	Win	14–0	Salvatore Gennatiempo	PTS	10 (10)	1968-01-20	Santa Cruz de Tenerife, Spain	
13	Win	13–0	Benito Gallardo	TKO	6 (12)	1967-12-23	Santa Cruz de Tenerife, Spain	Won Spanish lightweight title
12	Win	12–0	Kid Rainbow	KO	3 (8)	1967-12-09	Plaza de Toros, Santa Cruz de Tenerife, Spain	
11	Win	11–0	Manuel Artiles Medina	RTD	6 (8)	1967-08-26	Madrid, Spain	
10	Win	10–0	Francisco Trujillo	PTS	8 (8)	1967-07-08	Plaza de Toros, Santa Cruz de Tenerife, Spain	
9	Win	9–0	Jose Luis Martinez Madrid	RTD	5 (8)	1967-06-24	Plaza de Toros, Santa Cruz de Tenerife, Spain	
8	Win	8–0	Juan Pena	RTD	4 (8)	1967-06-08	Prado, Spain	
7	Win	7–0	Francesco Dessi	TKO	3 (8)	1967-06-02	Palacio de los Deportes, Madrid, Spain	
6	Win	6–0	Rene Rourre	PTS	8 (8)	1967-05-05	Palacio de los Deportes, Madrid, Spain	
5	Win	5–0	Francisco Antin	TKO	4 (8)	1967-04-13	Palacio de los Deportes, Madrid, Spain	
4	Win	4–0	Bernard Gimond	PTS	8 (8)	1967-03-31	Palacio de los Deportes, Madrid, Spain	
3	Win	3–0	Joaquin Martin	TKO	5 (6)	1966-12-23	Palacio de los Deportes, Madrid, Spain	
2	Win	2–0	Luis Segura	PTS	8 (8)	1966-12-17	Teatro Circo Moderno, Madrid, Spain	
1	Win	1–0	Manuel Garcia Perez	TKO	2 (6)	1966-12-02	Palacio de los Deportes, Madrid, Spain	

== See also ==
- List of world light-welterweight boxing champions

Sporting positions
Regional boxing titles
Vacant Title last held by Pedro Carrasco	EBU lightweight champion 29 January 1970 – 31 July 1971	Succeeded by Antonio Puddu
World boxing titles
Preceded by Saensak Muangsurin	WBC super lightweight champion 30 June 1976 – 29 October 1976	Succeeded by Saensak Muangsurin
