= Charley Ellis =

American boxer (1944–2018)

Personal information
- Born: January 12, 1944 Louisville, Kentucky, United States
- Died: August 29, 2018 (aged 74)

Sport
- Sport: Boxing

Charley Ellis (January 12, 1944 – August 29, 2018) was an American boxer. He competed in the men's light welterweight event at the 1964 Summer Olympics. At the 1964 Summer Olympics, he defeated Heiko Winter of the United Team of Germany, before losing to Yevgeny Frolov of the Soviet Union.
