= João da Silva (boxer) =

Brazilian boxer (1946–1982)

Personal information
- Full name: João Henrique da Silva
- Born: 1 January 1946 Juazeiro, Brazil
- Died: 12 March 1982 (aged 36) Arujá, Brazil
- Height: 172 cm (5 ft 8 in)

Sport
- Sport: Boxing
- Weight class: Lightweight (-60 kg); Light welterweight (-63.5 kg)
Medal record
Men's boxing
Representing Brazil
Pan American Games
Silver medal – second place	1963 São Paulo	Lightweight -60 kg

João Henrique da Silva (1 January 1946 – 12 March 1982) was a Brazilian boxer. He competed in the men's light welterweight event at the 1964 Summer Olympics. At the 1964 Summer Olympics, he defeated Chang Pin-cheng and Nadimi Ghasre Dashti, before losing to Eddie Blay.
