= Tunisia at the 1964 Summer Olympics =

- IOC code: TUN
- NOC: Tunisian Olympic Committee

in Tokyo
- Competitors: 9 in 3 sports
- Flag bearer: Slaheddine Baly
- Medals Ranked 29th: Gold 0 Silver 1 Bronze 1 Total 2

Summer Olympics appearances (overview)
- 1960; 1964; 1968; 1972; 1976; 1980; 1984; 1988; 1992; 1996; 2000; 2004; 2008; 2012; 2016; 2020; 2024

Tunisia competed at the 1964 Summer Olympics in Tokyo, Japan. This was the nation's second appearance at the Summer Olympics.

== Medalists ==
=== Silver ===
- Mohammed Gammoudi — Athletics, Men's 10.000 metres

=== Bronze ===
- Habib Galhia — Boxing, Men's Light Welterweight

== Athletics ==
Men
Track & road events

Athlete	Event	Heat		Quarterfinal		Semifinal		Final	
Athlete	Event	Result	Rank	Result	Rank	Result	Rank	Result	Rank
Hedhili Ben Boubaker	Marathon	—N/a						DNF	
Naceur Ben Messaoud	20 km walk	—N/a						DNF	
Naceur Ben Messaoud	50 km walk	—N/a						DSQ	
Chedli El Marghni	20 km walk	—N/a						1:41:11	24
Chedli El Marghni	50 km walk	—N/a						4:59:13.0	30
Mohammed Gammoudi	5000 m	14:10.2	1 Q	—N/a				DNS	
Mohammed Gammoudi	10,000 m	—N/a						28:24.8	Silver medal
Mohammed Gammoudi	Marathon	—N/a						DNS	
Mohamed Hannachi Mheddeb	10,000 m	—N/a						DNF	
Mohamed Hannachi Mheddeb	Marathon	—N/a						DNF	
Ayachi Labidi Taouadi	3000 m steeplechase	9:02.0	9	did not advance					

== Boxing ==
Men

Athlete	Event	1 Round	2 Round	3 Round	Quarterfinals	Semifinals	Final	
Athlete	Event	Opposition Result	Opposition Result	Opposition Result	Opposition Result	Opposition Result	Rank	
Tahar Ben Hassan	Featherweight	BYE	Peter Weiss (AUT); W 3-2	Anthony Villanueva (PHI); L 1-4	did not advance			
Habib Galhia	Welterweight	BYE	Willem Gerlach (NED); W 3-2	Pun Omparsad (NEP); W TKO	Felix Betancourt (CUB); W TKO	Yevgeny Frolov (URS); L 0-5	did not advance	Bronze medal

== Judo ==
Men

Athlete	Event	Round 1	Round 2	Round 3	Repechage 1	Repechage 2	Quarterfinal	Semifinal	Final / BM
Athlete	Event	Opposition Result	Opposition Result	Opposition Result	Opposition Result	Opposition Result	Opposition Result	Opposition Result	Rank
Ali Hachicha	Open	BYE	Theodore Boronovskis (AUS); L 0000-1000	John Ryan (IRL); L 0000-1000	did not advance				
