= Tunisia at the Olympics =

- IOC code: TUN
- NOC: Tunisian Olympic Committee
- Website: www.cnot.org.tn (in French)
- Medals Ranked 70th: Gold 6 Silver 4 Bronze 8 Total 18

Summer appearances
- 1960; 1964; 1968; 1972; 1976; 1980; 1984; 1988; 1992; 1996; 2000; 2004; 2008; 2012; 2016; 2020; 2024

Tunisia first participated at the Olympic Games in 1960, and has sent athletes to compete in every Summer Olympic Games since then, except when they participated in the American-led boycott of the 1980 Summer Olympics. The nation has never participated in any Winter Olympic Games.

Tunisian athletes have won a total of 18 medals, including four by the great long-distance runner Mohammed Gammoudi in men's athletics, four in men's swimming: three by long-distance swimmer Oussama Mellouli and one by Ahmed Ayoub Hafnaoui, two in men's boxing, one in women's athletics, one in women's fencing, three in men's taekwondo and most recently one in men's fencing in the 2024 Paris Olympics by Fares Ferjani.

The National Olympic Committee for Tunisia was created in 1957.

== History ==
=== Rome 1960 to Moscow 1980 ===
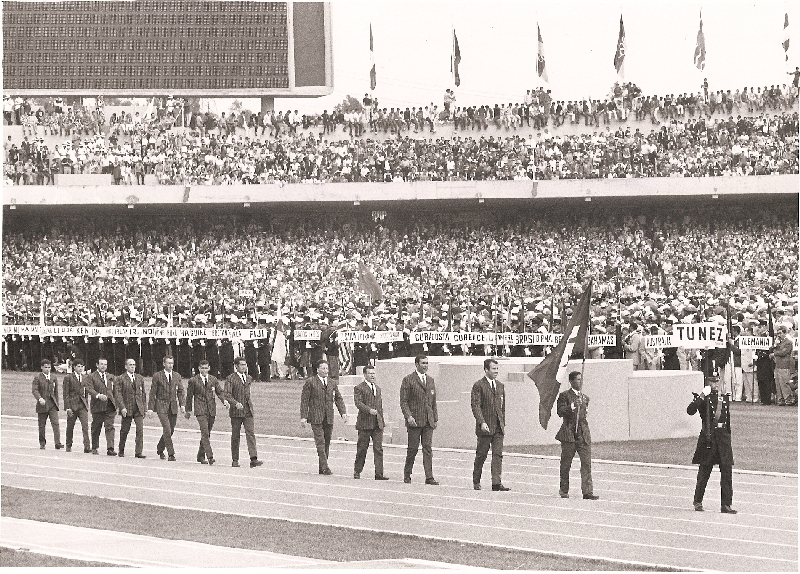
Team Tunisia at the 1968 Summer Olympics open ceremony in Mexico City.

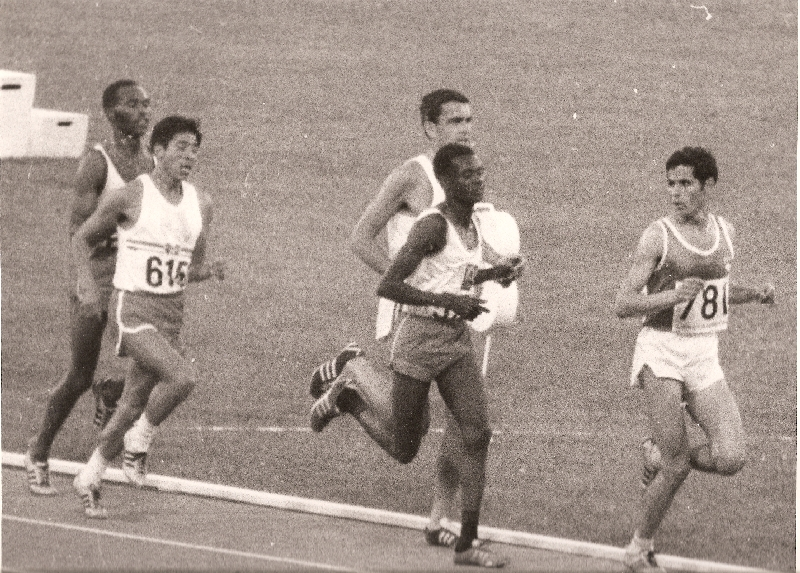
Mohammed Gammoudi (top right) when he won Tunisia's first Olympic gold medal at the 1968 Summer Olympics in Mexico City.

Tunisia first took part in the 1960 Summer Olympics in Rome. The 45 men competed in athletics, Boxing, Fencing, Cycling, Modern pentathlon, Shooting and Football. The first Olympians came from the boxing relay. On 25 August 1960, the bantamweight Tahar Ben Hassan, the lightweight Noureddine Dziri, the light welterweight Azouz Bechir and the welterweight Omrane Sadok came to their first-round bouts.

The first medals were won in 1964 Summer Olympics in Tokyo. Tunisia's first medalist was Mohammed Gammoudi on 14 October 1964, who won silver in the 10,000 meter. Boxer Habib Galhia won the light welterweight bronze a week later. A Tunisian judoka took part in Tokyo for the first time. At 1968 Summer Olympics in Mexico City Gammoudi was able to triple his medal haul. In addition to winning a bronze medal in the 10,000 meters, he became Tunisia's first Olympic champion in the 5,000 meters on 15 October 1968. At 1972 Summer Olympics in Munich, handball players, volleyball players and a wrestler competed for the first time. Mohammed Gammoudi won his fourth Olympic medal with silver in the 5000 meters. So far (2020) he is the Tunisian with the most medals at the Olympic Games.

Tunisia was one of the few African countries to take part in the 1976 Summer Olympics in Montreal. The athletes were not used, but swimmers took part for the first time. In addition, a Tunisian woman started in Montreal for the first time. Myriam Mizouni became the country's first Olympian on 18 July 1976 in the 100-meter freestyle heats. The country immediately joined the US-led boycott of the 1980 Summer Olympics in Moscow.

=== Los Angeles 1984 to Athens 2004 ===
At 1984 Summer Olympics in Los Angeles, Tunisian weightlifters took part for the first time. In Boxing, Lotfi Belkhir reached the quarterfinals at light welterweight. In Seoul 1988, Tunisian table tennis players made their Olympic debut. The football selection met in the preliminary round the team from West Germany, which later won bronze, and lost 1–4. At 1992 Summer Olympics in Barcelona, in which a sports sailor competed for the first time, were unsuccessful for the Tunisian team.

It was not until 1996 Summer Olympics in Atlanta that a medal could be celebrated again. Boxer Fethi Missaoui won bronze at light welterweight. In athletics, Ali Hakimi reached the 1500m final and finished eighth. In Atlanta, a Tunisian tennis player took part for the first time. Tunisian rowers made their Olympic debut in Sydney in 2000. The team was also unsuccessful in 2000 Sydney.

At 2004 Summer Olympics in Athens, Tunisian Taekwondoin and a gymnast competed for the first time. Swimmer Oussama Mellouli reached the final in the 400m individual medley and finished 5th. In women's weightlifting, Hayet Sassi finished 4th in the middleweight division. The taekwondoin Hichem Hamdouni was able to reach the quarterfinals in the welterweight division. Saber fencer Azza Besbes also reached the quarterfinals.

=== Beijing 2008 to present ===
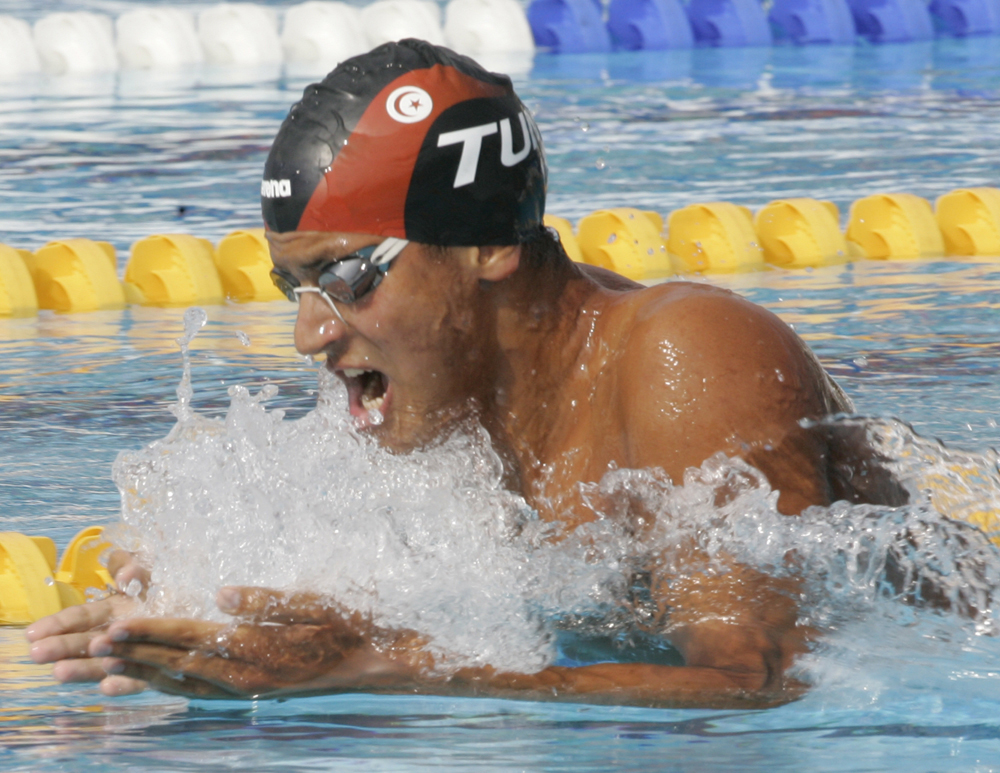
Oussama Mellouli double olympic champion in swimming.

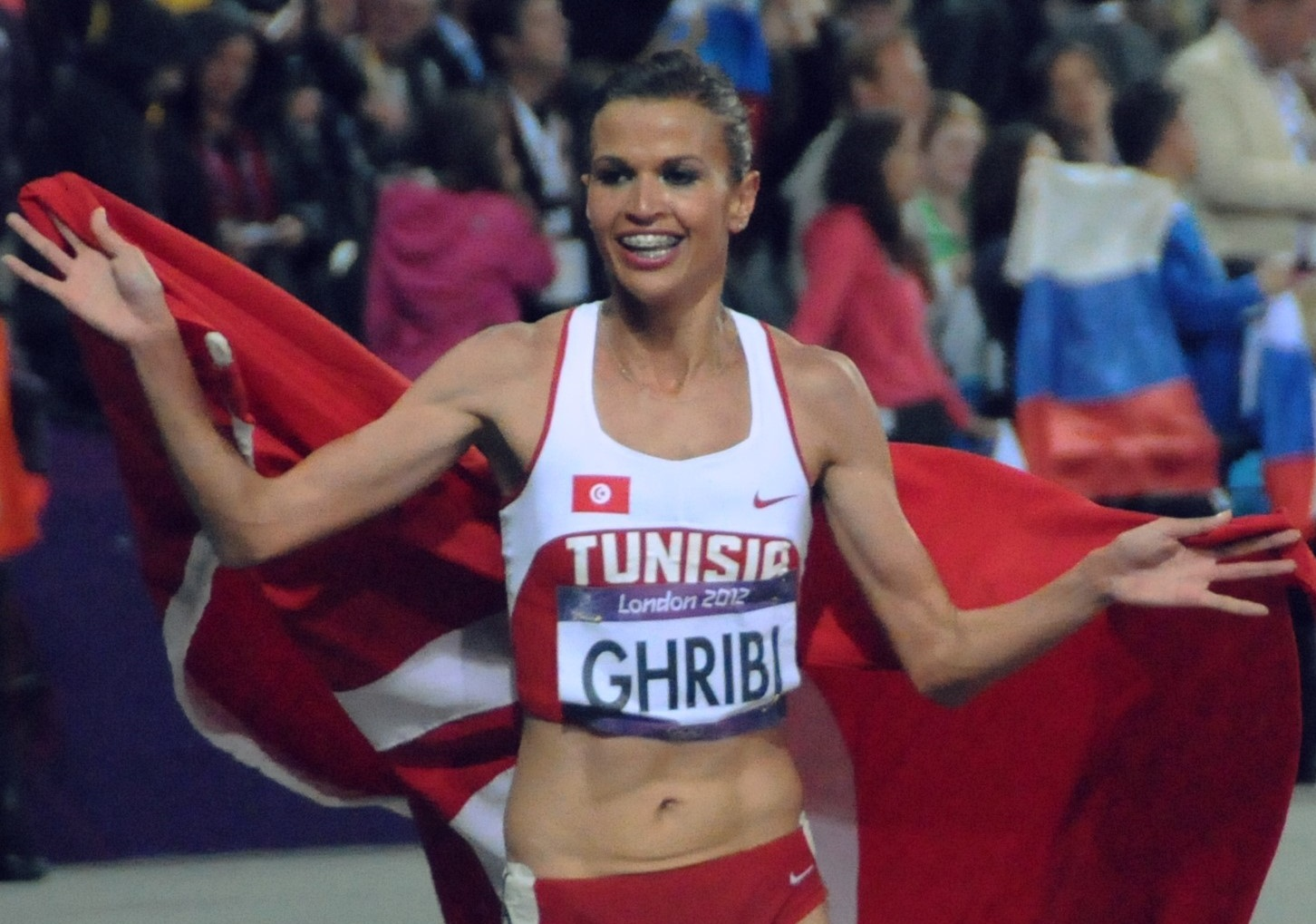
Habiba Ghribi 3,000 meter steeplechase olympic champion.

After 40 years, a Tunisian Olympic victory was celebrated again at 2008 Summer Olympics in Beijing. Oussama Mellouli won the 1500m freestyle final after finishing fifth in the 400m freestyle. Boxer Walid Cherif reached the flyweight quarterfinals. In London 2012, basketball players and canoeists competed for the first time. Oussama Mellouli won bronze in the 1500 meter freestyle and became Olympic champion in the 10 km open water swim. This makes Mellouli Tunisia's first double Olympic champion. He is also the first swimmer to win both indoor (1500m freestyle in Beijing 2008) and outdoor (10 km open water 2012 in London) olympic gold medals.

Track and field athlete Habiba Ghribi took second place in the 3,000 meter steeplechase race. The winner, the Russian Yuliya Zaripova, was found guilty of doping in 2015 and disqualified. Ghribi moved up accordingly and was subsequently declared Olympic champion on 4 June 2016. Boxer Maroua Rahali reached the quarterfinals in the flyweight division. The Tunisian fencer also achieved top placements. Inès Boubakri was sixth in the foil, epee fencer Sarra Besbes eighth, her sister Azza Bebes ninth with the sabre.

At 2016 Summer Olympics in Rio de Janeiro, the Tunisian team won three bronze medals. Inès Boubakri won her medal in foil fencing, Marwa Amri in freestyle wrestling in the 58 kg class and Oussama Oueslati in welterweight taekwondo. Beach volleyball players from Tunisia competed in Rio de Janeiro for the first time. At 2020 Summer Olympics in Tokyo, the team won two medals, the gold for the swimmer Ahmed Ayoub Hafnaoui, who win at the men's 400-metre freestyle and the silver for the taekwondo practitioner Mohamed Khalil Jendoubi at the men's 58 kg.

At 2024 Summer Olympics in Paris, Tunisia has three medals at the Games, with Farès Ferjani winning silver in the individual men's sabre event and Mohamed Khalil Jendoubi capturing the bronze in the men's 58 kg event, the latter becoming the first Tunisian to score back-to-back medals in taekwondo during the Olympics. Firas Katoussi would follow suit with the country's first gold medal in the Taekwondo men's 80 kg event.

== Medal tables ==
=== Medals by Summer Games ===
Games	Athletes	Gold	Silver	Bronze	Total	Rank
1960 Rome	42	0	0	0	0	–
1964 Tokyo	9	0	1	1	2	29
1968 Mexico City	7	1	0	1	2	28
1972 Munich	35	0	1	0	1	33
1976 Montreal	15	0	0	0	0	–
1980 Moscow	boycotted					
1984 Los Angeles	23	0	0	0	0	–
1988 Seoul	41	0	0	0	0	–
1992 Barcelona	13	0	0	0	0	–
1996 Atlanta	51	0	0	1	1	71
2000 Sydney	47	0	0	0	0	–
2004 Athens	54	0	0	0	0	–
2008 Beijing	28	1	0	0	1	52
2012 London	83	2	0	1	3	35
2016 Rio de Janeiro	61	0	0	3	3	75
2020 Tokyo	63	1	1	0	2	58
2024 Paris	26	1	1	1	3	52
2028 Los Angeles	future event					
2032 Brisbane	future event					
Total		6	4	8	18	70

=== Medals by sport ===
Sport	Gold	Silver	Bronze	Total
Athletics	2	2	1	5
Swimming	2	0	1	3
Taekwondo	1	1	2	4
Marathon swimming	1	0	0	1
Fencing	0	1	1	2
Boxing	0	0	2	2
Wrestling	0	0	1	1
Totals (7 entries)	6	4	8	18

== List of medalists ==
Medal	Name	Games	Sport	Event
Silver	Mohammed Gammoudi	(Japan) 1964 Tokyo	Athletics	Men's 10,000 m
Bronze	Habib Galhia	(Japan) 1964 Tokyo	Boxing	Men's light welterweight
Gold	Mohammed Gammoudi	1968 Mexico City	Athletics	Men's 5000 m
Bronze	Mohammed Gammoudi	1968 Mexico City	Athletics	Men's 10,000 m
Silver	Mohammed Gammoudi	(West Germany) 1972 Munich	Athletics	Men's 5000 m
Bronze	Fethi Missaoui	(United States) 1996 Atlanta	Boxing	Men's light welterweight
Gold	Oussama Mellouli	(China) 2008 Beijing	Swimming	Men's 1500 m freestyle
Gold	Oussama Mellouli	(United Kingdom) 2012 London	Marathon swimming	Men's 10km marathon
Gold	Habiba Ghribi	(United Kingdom) 2012 London	Athletics	Women's 3000 m steeplechase
Bronze	Oussama Mellouli	(United Kingdom) 2012 London	Swimming	Men's 1500 m freestyle
Bronze	Inès Boubakri	(Brazil) 2016 Rio de Janeiro	Fencing	Women's Foil
Bronze	Oussama Oueslati	(Brazil) 2016 Rio de Janeiro	Taekwondo	Men's 80 kg
Bronze	Marwa Amri	(Brazil) 2016 Rio de Janeiro	Wrestling	Women's freestyle 58 kg
Gold	Ahmed Hafnaoui	(Japan) 2020 Tokyo	Swimming	Men's 400 m freestyle
Silver	Mohamed Khalil Jendoubi	(Japan) 2020 Tokyo	Taekwondo	Men's 58 kg
Gold	Firas Katoussi	(France) 2024 Paris	Taekwondo	Men's 80 kg
Silver	Farès Ferjani	(France) 2024 Paris	Fencing	Men's sabre
Bronze	Mohamed Khalil Jendoubi	(France) 2024 Paris	Taekwondo	Men's 58 kg

== See also ==
- List of flag bearers for Tunisia at the Olympics
- Category:Olympic competitors for Tunisia
- Tunisia at the Paralympics
