= Yevgeny Frolov =

Yevgeny Frolov may refer to:

- Yevgeny Frolov (boxer) (born 1941), Soviet boxer
- Yevgeny Frolov (fencer), Kazakhstani fencer who participated in the 2006 Asian Games
- Yevgeny Frolov (footballer, born 1986), Russian footballer
- Yevgeny Frolov (footballer, born 1988), Russian footballer
- Yevgeny Frolov (footballer, born 1997), Russian footballer
- Yevgeny Frolov (pilot) (born 1951), Russian test pilot, the namesake of "Frolov's chakra" maneuver
