= Brian Anderson (Irish boxer) =

Irish boxer

Personal information
- Nationality: Irish
- Born: 22 May 1939 (age 85)

Sport
- Sport: Boxing

Brian Anderson (born 22 May 1939) is an Irish boxer. He competed in the men's light welterweight event at the 1964 Summer Olympics.

== Biography ==
Anderson was born in Carrickmagrath, Ballybofey, County Donegal, Ireland.

In 1958 Anderson went to London where he joined Middle Row Boxing Club. Boxing as a novice, Anderson won the North London Divisional Championships as bantamweight. He later moved up to featherweight, and at this level won the All-London Championships. He left the sport in 1961, but returned to win the lightweight division in 1962.

In May 1964 British Amateur Boxing Association Championships Anderson, now at light-welterweight, defeated the Scottish boxer and Olympic medallist Dick McTaggart in the semi-final, but was controversially beaten by Robert Taylor in the final.

Anderson was selected for the English boxing team for an international match in Hungary in August 1964, and won both his bouts, including one against the Olympian Istvan Toth.

Anderson had been in contention to be picked for the British Olympic team for the 1964 Tokyo Olympics, but McTaggart was actually selected. However, just a month before the Games, Anderson was chosen for the Irish Olympic Team to replace the injured light-welterweight Jim Neill. He was narrowly defeated in a 3-2 decision by the Cambodian Touch Nol in his first match. His close friend Jim McCourt won a bronze medal, with Anderson and team coach Harry Enright in his corner.

In 1965 Anderson won the Irish senior title, claiming the light-welterweight crown.

Anderson returned to his hometown of Carrickmagrath. In 1979, he founded the Twin Towns Boxing Club with his brother, Peter.

Ciara Anderson, his granddaughter, is a multiple Irish boxing champion.
