= Weightlifting at the 1968 Summer Olympics – Men's 67.5 kg =

Weightlifting at the Olympics

Men's 67.5 kg at the Games of the XIX Olympiad
- Venue: Teatro de los Insurgentes
- Date: 15 October 1968
- Competitors: 20 from 17 nations
- Winning total: 437.5 kg OR

Medalists
1st place, gold medalist(s)		Waldemar Baszanowski	Poland
2nd place, silver medalist(s)		Parviz Jalayer	Iran
3rd place, bronze medalist(s)		Marian Zieliński	Poland

The men's 67.5 kg weightlifting competitions at the 1968 Summer Olympics in Mexico City took place on 15 October at the Teatro de los Insurgentes. It was the eleventh appearance of the lightweight class.

== Results ==
Rank	Name	Country	kg
1	Waldemar Baszanowski	Poland	437.5
2	Parviz Jalayer	Iran	422.5
3	Marian Zieliński	Poland	420.0
4	Nobuyuki Hatta	Japan	417.5
5	Won Shin-hee	South Korea	415.0
6	János Bagócs	Hungary	412.5
7	Takeo Kimura	Japan	405.0
8	Kostadin Tilev	Bulgaria	397.5
9	Ondrej Hekel	Czechoslovakia	390.0
10	Uwe Kliche	West Germany	390.0
11	Zuhair Elia Mansour	Iraq	387.5
12	Rilko Florov	Bulgaria	385.0
13	Anselmo Silvino	Italy	385.0
14	Mohamed Tarabulsi	Lebanon	377.5
15	Mauro Alanís	Mexico	360.0
16	Hugo Gittens	Trinidad and Tobago	360.0
17	Chen Chia-nan	Taiwan	355.0
18	Eun Tin Loy	Malaysia	347.5
19	Mario Mendoza	British Honduras	280.0
AC	Valerio Fontanals	El Salvador	185.0
