= List of flag bearers for Tunisia at the Olympics =

Tunisia at the Olympics
- IOC code: TUN
- NOC: Tunisian Olympic Committee
- Website: www.cnot.org.tn (in French)
- Medals: Gold 6 Silver 4 Bronze 8 Total 18

Summer appearances
- 1960; 1964; 1968; 1972; 1976; 1980; 1984; 1988; 1992; 1996; 2000; 2004; 2008; 2012; 2016; 2020; 2024

This is a list of flag bearers who have represented Tunisia at the Olympics.

Flag bearers carry the national flag of their country at the opening ceremony of the Olympic Games.

#	Event year	Season	Flag bearer	Sport
1	1960	Summer	Houcine Cherif Hammouda	Official
2	1964	Summer	Slaheddine Baly	Official
3	1968	Summer	Habib Galhia	Boxing
4	1972	Summer	Salem Boughattas	Athletics (did not compete)
5	1976	Summer	Mohammed Gammoudi	Athletics
6	1984	Summer	Féthi Baccouche	Athletics
7	1988	Summer	Sofiane Ben Letaief	Table tennis
8	1992	Summer	Fadhel Khayati	Athletics
9	1996	Summer	Iskander Hachicha	Judo
10	2000	Summer	Omrane Ayari	Wrestling
11	2004	Summer	Noureddine Hfaiedh	Volleyball
12	2008	Summer	Anis Chedli	Judo
13	2012	Summer	Heykel Megannem	Handball
14	2016	Summer	Oussama Mellouli	Swimming
15	2020	Summer	Mehdi Ben Cheikh	Volleyball
15	2020	Summer	Inès Boubakri	Fencing
16	2024	Summer	Samil Jemai	Canoeing
16	2024	Summer	Khadija Krimi	Rowing

== See also ==
- Tunisia at the Olympics
