= Keramat Nadimi =

Iranian boxer

Personal information
- Full name: Keramat Nadimi Ghasredashti
- Nationality: Iranian
- Born: 31 May 1940 (age 84); Abadan, Iran

Sport
- Sport: Boxing

Keramat Nadimi Ghasredashti (Persian: کرامت ندیمی قصردشتی, born 31 May 1940) is an Iranian boxer. He competed in the men's light welterweight event at the 1964 Summer Olympics. At the 1964 Summer Olympics, he defeated Gopalan Ramakrishnan of Malaysia, before losing to João da Silva of Brazil.
