= Brian Maunsell =

Brian Maunsell may refer to the following people:

- Brian Maunsell (boxer) (1937–2021), New Zealand boxer
- Brian Maunsell (field hockey) (1935–1987), New Zealand field hockey player
