= Fasoli =

Fasoli is a surname of Italian origin. Notable people with this surname include:

- Claudio Fasoli (born 1939), Italian jazz-saxophonist and composer of modern jazz
- Ermanno Fasoli (1943–2025), Italian boxer
- Michele Pio Fasoli (1676–1716), Italian friar and missionary, companion of the Blessed Johannes Laurentius Weiss

== See also ==
- Fasolis
