= James Wallington =

James Wallington may refer to:

- Jimmy Wallington (1907–1972), American radio and TV announcer and personality, a/k/a James Wallington
- Jim Wallington (1944–1988), American welterweight boxer, a/k/a James Wallington
