= Carlos Casal =

Uruguayan boxer

Personal information
- Born: 2 August 1946 (age 78); Montevideo, Uruguay

Sport
- Sport: Boxing

Carlos Casal (born 2 August 1946) is a Uruguayan boxer. He competed in the men's light welterweight event at the 1968 Summer Olympics. At the 1968 Summer Olympics, he lost to Giambattista Capretti of Italy.
