= Boxing at the 1964 Summer Olympics – Light welterweight =

Boxing competitions

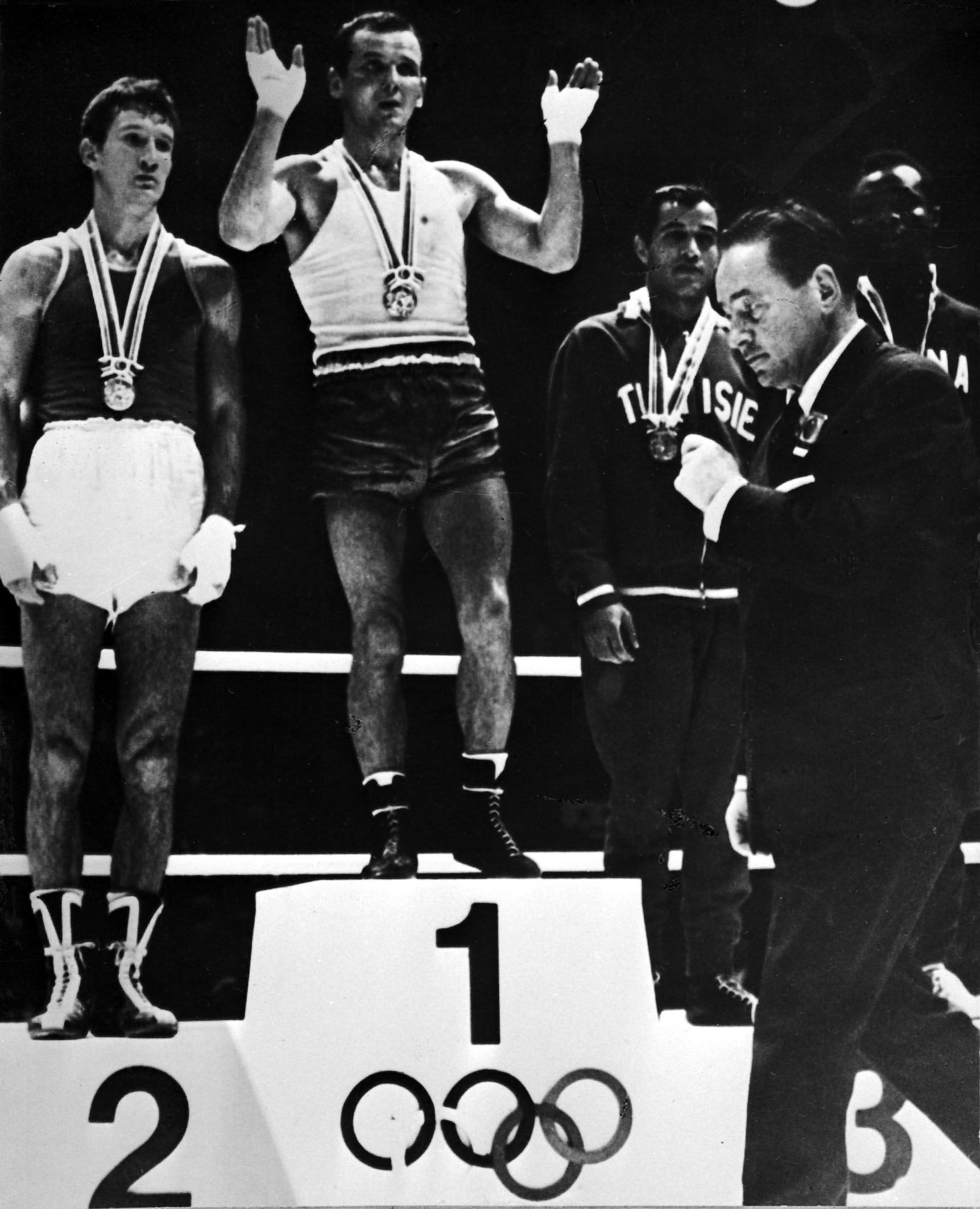
Boxing light-welterweight at 1964 Olympics. Left to right: Yevgeny Frolov, Jerzy Kulej, Habib Galhia, unknown and Eddie Blay

The light welterweight class in the boxing at the 1964 Summer Olympics competition was the fifth-lightest class. Light welterweights were limited to those boxers weighing less than 63.5 kilograms. 35 boxers from 35 nations competed.

== Medalists ==
Gold	Jerzy Kulej; Poland
Silver	Yevgeny Frolov; Soviet Union
Bronze	Eddie Blay; Ghana
Bronze	Habib Galhia; Tunisia

== Results ==
First round 11 October
Tóth (HUN)	4
Prasertsom (THA)	1
Olulu (KEN)	5
Zazueta (MEX)	0
Daraktchiev (BUL)	RSC
Kučera (TCH)	W

Round of 32; 15 October
Da Silva (BRA)	W
Chang (ROC)	RSC
Nadimi (IRI)	W
Gopalan (MAS)	RSC
Blay (GHA)	5
Rasmussen (DEN)	0
Touch (CAM)	3
Anderson (IRL)	2
McTaggart (GBR)	5
Rossi (AUS)	0
Amaya (ARG)	0
Kulej (POL)	5
Mihalic (ROU)	W
König (AUT)	RSC
Park (KOR)	0
Fasoli (ITA)	5
Fatah (MAR)	L
Betancourt (CUB)	KO
Yonekura (JPN)	3
Velázquez (ESP)	2
Omparsad (NEP)	W
Guebre Giorgis (ETH)	DQ
Galhia (TUN)	3
Gerlach (NED)	2
Frolov (URS)	W
Maunsell (NZL)	RSC
Winter (EUA)	0
Ellis (USA)	5
Reti (CAN)	2
Tóth (HUN)	3
Olulu (KEN)	0
Kučera (TCH)	5

Round of 16; 18 October
Da Silva (BRA)	3
Nadimi (IRI)	2
Blay (GHA)	KO
Touch (CAM)	L
McTaggart (GBR)	1
Kulej (POL)	4
Mihalic (ROU)	4
Fasoli (ITA)	1
Betancourt (CUB)	3
Yonekura (JPN)	2
Omparsad (NEP)	L
Galhia (TUN)	KO
Frolov (URS)	3
Ellis (USA)	2
Tóth (HUN)	0
Kučera (TCH)	5

Quarterfinals; 20 October
Da Silva (BRA)	0
Blay (GHA)	5
Kulej (POL)	4
Mihalic (ROU)	1
Betancourt (CUB)	L
Galhia (TUN)	KO
Frolov (URS)	W
Kučera (TCH)	DNS

Semifinals; 21 October
Blay (GHA) (bronze)	0
Kulej (POL)	5
Galhia (TUN) (bronze)	0
Frolov (URS)	5

Final; 23 October
Kulej (POL) (gold)	5
Frolov (URS) (silver)	0

== Sources ==
Tokyo Organizing Committee (1964). The Games of the XVIII Olympiad: Tokyo 1964, vol. 2.
