= Petar Daraktchiev =

Bulgarian boxer

Personal information
- Nationality: Bulgarian
- Born: 11 March 1943 (age 82)

Sport
- Sport: Boxing

Petar Daraktchiev (born 11 March 1943) is a Bulgarian boxer. He competed in the men's light welterweight event at the 1964 Summer Olympics. At the 1964 Summer Olympics, he lost to Vladimír Kučera of Czechoslovakia.
