= Odartey =

Odartey is a given name and surname. Notable people with the name include:

== Given name ==
- Emmanuel Odartey Lawson (born 1941), Ghanaian boxer
- Nii Odartey Lamptey (born 1974), Ghanaian footballer
- Odartey Lamptey (died 1948), Ghanaian ex-serviceman shot dead in the 1948 Accra riots

== Surname ==
- Neville Alexander Odartey-Wellington (1934–1979), Ghanaian army officer
