= Ernest Dong =

Cameroonian boxer (born 1942)

Personal information
- Nationality: Cameroonian
- Born: 22 February 1942 (age 83); Bafia, Cameroon

Sport
- Sport: Boxing

Ernest Dong (born 22 February 1942) is a Cameroonian boxer. He competed in the men's light welterweight event at the 1968 Summer Olympics. At the 1968 Summer Olympics, he lost to Antoniu Vasile of Romania.
