= Adalberto Siebens =

Puerto Rican boxer

Personal information
- Nationality: Puerto Rican
- Born: 20 October 1946 (age 78); Guayanilla, Puerto Rico

Sport
- Sport: Boxing

Adalberto Siebens (born 20 October 1946) is a Puerto Rican boxer. He competed in the men's light welterweight event at the 1968 Summer Olympics. At the 1968 Summer Olympics, he lost to Habib Galhia of Tunisia.
