= Touch Nol =

Cambodian boxer

Personal information
- Nationality: Cambodian
- Born: 3 January 1941 (age 84)

Sport
- Sport: Boxing

Touch Nol (born 3 January 1941) is a Cambodian boxer. He competed in the men's light welterweight event at the 1964 Summer Olympics. At the 1964 Summer Olympics, he defeated Brian Anderson of Ireland, before losing to Eddie Blay of Ghana.
