= Gert Puzicha =

German boxer

Personal information
- Nationality: German
- Born: 25 January 1944 Coesfeld, Germany
- Died: 19 January 2012 (aged 67) Essen, Germany

Sport
- Sport: Boxing

Gert Puzicha (25 January 1944 – 19 January 2012) was a German boxer. He competed in the men's light welterweight event at the 1968 Summer Olympics. Puzicha committed suicide in 2012 by drowning himself in the Ruhr.
