= Jim Wallington =

American boxer (1944–1988)

Personal information
- Full name: James Robert Wallington Jr.
- Born: July 28, 1944 Philadelphia, Pennsylvania, U.S.
- Died: April 20, 1988 (aged 43) Lawrence, Indiana, U.S.
- Height: 5 ft 11 in (1.80 m)
- Weight: 139 lb (63 kg)

Sport
- Sport: Boxing
- Weight class: Light welterweight
Medal record
Men's boxing
Representing the United States
Olympic Games
Bronze medal – third place	1968 Mexico City	Light welterweight -63.5 kg
Pan American Games
Gold medal – first place	1967 Winnipeg	Light welterweight -63.5 kg

James Robert Wallington Jr. (July 28, 1944 – April 20, 1988) was an American welterweight boxer from Philadelphia, Pennsylvania, who represented the United States at the 1968 Summer Olympics in Mexico City, Mexico.

Wallington won the bronze medal in the men's light welterweight division (– 63.5 kg) after a loss in the semifinals against eventual silver medalist Enrique Regueiferos from Cuba. He won the gold medal at the Pan American Games a year earlier. Wallington was also the US National Amateur Light Welterweight Champion in 1966 and 1967.

Wallington also served in the US Army. He died aged 43.

== 1968 Olympic results ==
Below are the results of James Wallington, an American boxer who competed in the light welterweight classification at the 1968 Olympics in Mexico City:

- Round of 64: bye
- Round of 32: defeated Donato Cartagena (Dominican Republic) referee stopped contest
- Round of 16: defeated Alex Odhiambo (Uganda) by decision, 5-0
- Quarterfinal: defeated Kim Sa-yong (South Korea) by decision, 5-0
- Semifinal: lost to Enrique Regueiferos (Cuba) by decision, 1-4 (was awarded bronze medal)
