= Kim Sa-yong =

South Korean boxer

Kim Sa-yeong
Personal information
- Full name: Kim sa-yeong
- Nationality: South Korean
- Born: 23 August 1944; Seonsan, Japanese Occupation Joseon (nowadays Seonsan-eup, Gumi, Gyeongsangbuk-do, South Korea)
- Died: 2004 (aged 59–60)

Sport
- Sport: Boxing

Kim Sa-yong (23 August 1944 – 2004) was a South Korean boxer. He competed in the men's light welterweight event at the 1968 Summer Olympics.
