= Nelson Ruiz =

Venezuelan boxer

Personal information
- Nationality: Venezuela
- Born: 25 May 1949 (age 77) Maracaibo, Venezuela
- Weight: Light welterweight

Boxing career

Boxing record
- Total fights: 11
- Wins: 8
- Win by KO: 6
- Losses: 2
- Draws: 1
- No contests: 0

Nelson Ruiz (born 25 May 1949) is a Venezuelan boxer. He competed in the men's light welterweight event at the 1968 Summer Olympics.
