= Samuel Valencia =

Ecuadorian boxer

Personal information
- Nationality: Ecuadorian
- Born: 19 October 1947 (age 77)

Sport
- Sport: Boxing

Samuel Valencia (born 19 October 1947) is an Ecuadorian boxer. He competed in the men's light welterweight event at the 1968 Summer Olympics.
