= Chen Chia-nan =

Taiwanese weightlifter

Personal information
- Nationality: Taiwanese
- Born: 24 July 1942 (age 82)

Sport
- Sport: Weightlifting

Chen Chia-nan (born 24 July 1942) is a Taiwanese weightlifter. He competed in the men's lightweight event at the 1968 Summer Olympics.
