= Wolfgang Trödler =

German boxer

Medal record

Representing East Germany

Men's Boxing

European Championships
Bronze medal – third place	1965 Berlin	Middleweight

Wolfgang Trödler is a German middleweight boxer who won the bronze medals at the 1965 European Amateur Boxing Championships. He contended for the SC Dynamo Berlin / Sportvereinigung (SV) Dynamo.
