= Detlef Dahn =

East German boxer

Personal information
- Nationality: German
- Born: 18 January 1943 (age 82); Berlin, Germany

Sport
- Sport: Boxing

Detlef Dahn (born 18 January 1943) is a German boxer who had trained as a toolmaker.

Dahn was born in Berlin and boxed for East Germany. He began boxing as a featherweight for SC Rotation Berlin in 1958. He was coached by Günter Debert. He boxed for ASK Vorwärts Berlin from 1964.

Dahn was national champion in 1965. That same year, he also won a bronze medal at the 1965 European Amateur Boxing Championships in the up to 67kg category. He was defeated on points by Italian Luigi Patruno in their semi-final match. When the East German amateur boxing team traveled to Glasgow to face Scotland in October 1965, Dahn was described by the Evening Times as "perhaps the best known member of the [East German] team."

As of April 1966, he was being trained by Wolter Kemberger and had undertaken 90 fights, 10 of which were international, and 72 of which were victories.

His quest to medal again at the 1967 European Amateur Boxing Championships was ended by his defeat by his fellow East German Manfred Wolke, the eventual silver medal finisher.

He also competed in the men's light middleweight event at the 1968 Summer Olympics.

Following his career in the ring, Dahn continued to be associated with boxing as a coach.

Dahn's son Robert is a singer in the band Equilibrium.
