= Eduardo Zazueta =

Mexican boxer (born 1944)

Personal information
- Born: 18 May 1944 (age 80); San Luis Rio Colorado, Mexico

Sport
- Sport: Boxing

Eduardo Zazueta (born 18 May 1944) is a Mexican boxer. He competed in the men's light welterweight event at the 1964 Summer Olympics. At the 1964 Summer Olympics, he lost to John Olulu of Kenya.

A native of San Luis Río Colorado, he was the amateur national champion in 1962 and competed at the 1963 Pan American Games.
