= Viktor Ageyev (boxer) =

Soviet-Russian boxer (1941–2025)

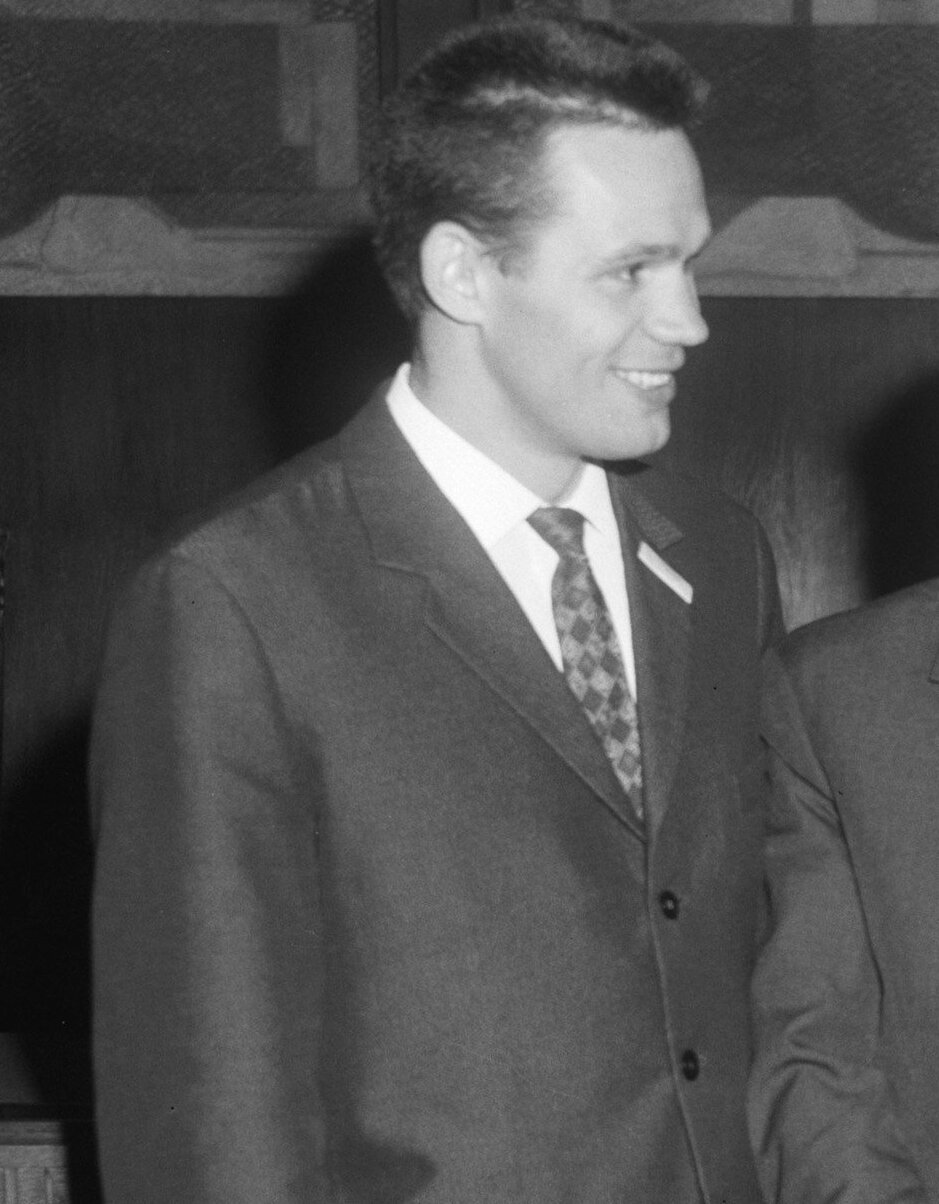
- Ageyev in 1966

Personal information
- Nationality: Soviet Union; Russia
- Born: 7 July 1941 Moscow, Russian SFSR, USSR
- Died: 17 September 2025 (aged 84) Moscow, Russia

Boxing career
Medal record
Men's amateur boxing
Representing Soviet Union
European Championships
Gold medal – first place	1965 East Berlin	Light middleweight
Gold medal – first place	1967 Rome	Light middleweight

Viktor Petrovich Ageyev (Russian: Виктор Петрович Агеев; 7 July 1941 – 17 September 2025), also known as Viktor Ageev, was a Soviet and Russian boxer.

== Biography ==
Ageyev was born in Moscow on 7 July 1941.

Ageyev competed at the 1965 European Amateur Boxing Championships, winning the gold medal in the light middleweight event. He also competed at the 1967 European Amateur Boxing Championships, winning the gold medal in the same event.

Ageyev died on 17 September 2025, at the age of 84.
