= Enrique González (boxer) =

Chilean boxer

Personal information
- Born: 7 September 1945 (age 79); Antofagasta, Chile

Sport
- Sport: Boxing

Enrique González (born 7 September 1945) is a Chilean boxer. He competed in the men's light welterweight event at the 1968 Summer Olympics.
