= Fasolis =

Fasolis is a surname. Notable people with the surname include:

- Clotilde Fasolis (born 1951), Italian former alpine skier
- Diego Fasolis (born 1958), Swiss classical organist and conductor

== See also ==
- Fasoli
