= Donato Cartagena =

Dominican boxer (born 1951)

Personal information
- Nationality: Dominican
- Born: 26 February 1951 (age 74); Tamboril, Dominican Republic

Sport
- Sport: Boxing

Donato Cartagena (born 26 February 1951) is a Dominican Republic boxer. He competed in the men's light welterweight event at the 1968 Summer Olympics.
