= Antonio Puddu =

Italian boxer (1944–2026)

Antonio Puddu (8 May 1944 – 6 March 2026), also known as Tonino Puddu, was an Italian boxer.

== Biography ==
=== Early life ===
Puddu was born in Cagliari, Sardinia on 8 May 1944.

=== Amateur career ===
As an amateur, Puddu won the bronze medal at the 1963 Italian Championships in Pesaro, in the super-lightweight, yielding by abandonment in the second round in front of Bruno Arcari. He then went down to featherweight and, at the 1965 Military World Championships, in Munich, won the gold medal. He turned professional in 1966.

=== Professional career ===
At the beginning of his career, Puddu racked up a series of 18 consecutive victories in the lightweight category. On 31 July 1968, in San Benedetto del Tronto, he was defeated for the first time by Carmelo Coscia; the match was interrupted due to an eyebrow injury. After another 19 matches, all won, in Italy but also with foreign opponents, he was designated to fight for the Italian title, then vacant. On 5 September 1970, in Cagliari, he became Italian lightweight champion, beating Enrico Barlatti by technical knock-out in the seventh round.

On 27 January 1971, in Barcelona, he challenged Miguel Velázquez for the European lightweight title but did not go beyond a draw. In the rematch, set up in Cagliari, on 31 July 2014, he beat Velazquez by knockout and won the European Champion belt.

Puddu defended the title victoriously on points with the Frenchmen Pierre-Claude Thomias and Jean-Pierre La Jouen, respectively on 27 October 1971, in Sanremo and on 28 January 1972, in Milan. On 14 March, in Cagliari, he took revenge on Carmelo Coscia, the only one until then to have defeated him, forcing him to surrender by knockout in not even two rounds. On 13 September, in Quartu Sant'Elena, he repelled the assault on the European title of the Lazio Enzo Petriglia, by knockout in the eleventh round and on 4 April 1973, in Cagliari, that of the other Frenchman Dominique Azzaro, by knockout in the first round.

On 27 October 1973, Puddu fought for the first time abroad, in Los Angeles, for the WBC lightweight world title. He was defeated by the Mexican Rodolfo González known as El Gato, by knockout in the tenth round. On 1 March 1974, in Cagliari, he lost the European title, by knockout in the sixth round, to the Scotsman Ken Buchanan, already world champion.

Puddu then dropped down a category, and on 19 June 1975, tried to climb to the European super featherweight title but was defeated on points by the Norwegian Sven Erik Paulsen with an indisputable verdict. He also lost on points to Vincenzo Burgio, in Milan, his new attempt to win the Italian lightweight title. He fought seven more times, with four wins and three losses, before retiring at the end of 1979.

=== Death ===
Puddu died on 6 March 2026, at the age of 81.
