= Félix Betancourt =

Cuban boxer (1945–2014)

Personal information
- Born: 12 October 1945; Santiago de Cuba, Cuba
- Died: 22 July 2014 (aged 68); Havana, Cuba

Sport
- Sport: Boxing

Félix Betancourt (12 October 1945 – 22 July 2014) was a Cuban boxer. He competed in the men's light welterweight event at the 1964 Summer Olympics.
