= Ivan Apostolov (pentathlete) =

Bulgarian modern pentathlete (born 1941)

Personal information
- Born: 20 December 1941 (age 84) Sofia, Bulgaria

Sport
- Sport: Modern pentathlon

Ivan Apostolov (Bulgarian: Иван Апостолов, born 20 December 1941) is a Bulgarian former modern pentathlete. He competed at the 1968 Summer Olympics.
