= Yevgeny Frolov (footballer, born 1997) =

Russian footballer

Personal information
- Full name: Yevgeny Maksimovich Frolov
- Date of birth: 2 January 1997 (age 29)
- Place of birth: Kaliningrad, Russia
- Height: 1.79 m (5 ft 10 1/2 in)
- Position: Midfielder

Senior career*
Years	Team	Apps	(Gls)
2015–2016	Baltika Kaliningrad	2	(0)
- * Club domestic league appearances and goals

Yevgeny Maksimovich Frolov (Russian: Евгений Максимович Фролов; born 2 January 1997) is a Russian former football player.

He made his debut in the Russian Football National League for FC Baltika Kaliningrad on 25 November 2015 in a game against FC Luch-Energiya Vladivostok.
