= Rilko Florov =

Bulgarian weightlifter

Personal information
- Nationality: Bulgarian
- Born: 20 August 1948 (age 76)

Sport
- Sport: Weightlifting

Rilko Florov (Bulgarian: Рилко Флоров, born 20 August 1948) is a Bulgarian weightlifter. He competed in the men's lightweight event at the 1968 Summer Olympics.
