= Ljubinko Veselinović =

Serbian boxer (born 1948)

Personal information
- Nationality: Serbian
- Born: 17 September 1948 (age 76); Kaluđerica, Yugoslavia

Sport
- Sport: Boxing

Ljubinko Veselinović (born 17 September 1948) is a Serbian boxer. He competed in the men's light welterweight event at the 1968 Summer Olympics.
