= Hoji Yonekura =

Japanese boxer

Personal information
- Nationality: Japanese
- Born: 3 October 1944 (age 80); Japan

Sport
- Sport: Boxing

Hoji Yonekura (米倉 宝二, Yonekura Hōji, born 3 October 1944) is a Japanese boxer. He competed in the men's light welterweight event at the 1964 Summer Olympics.
