= Santa Cruz Bullring =

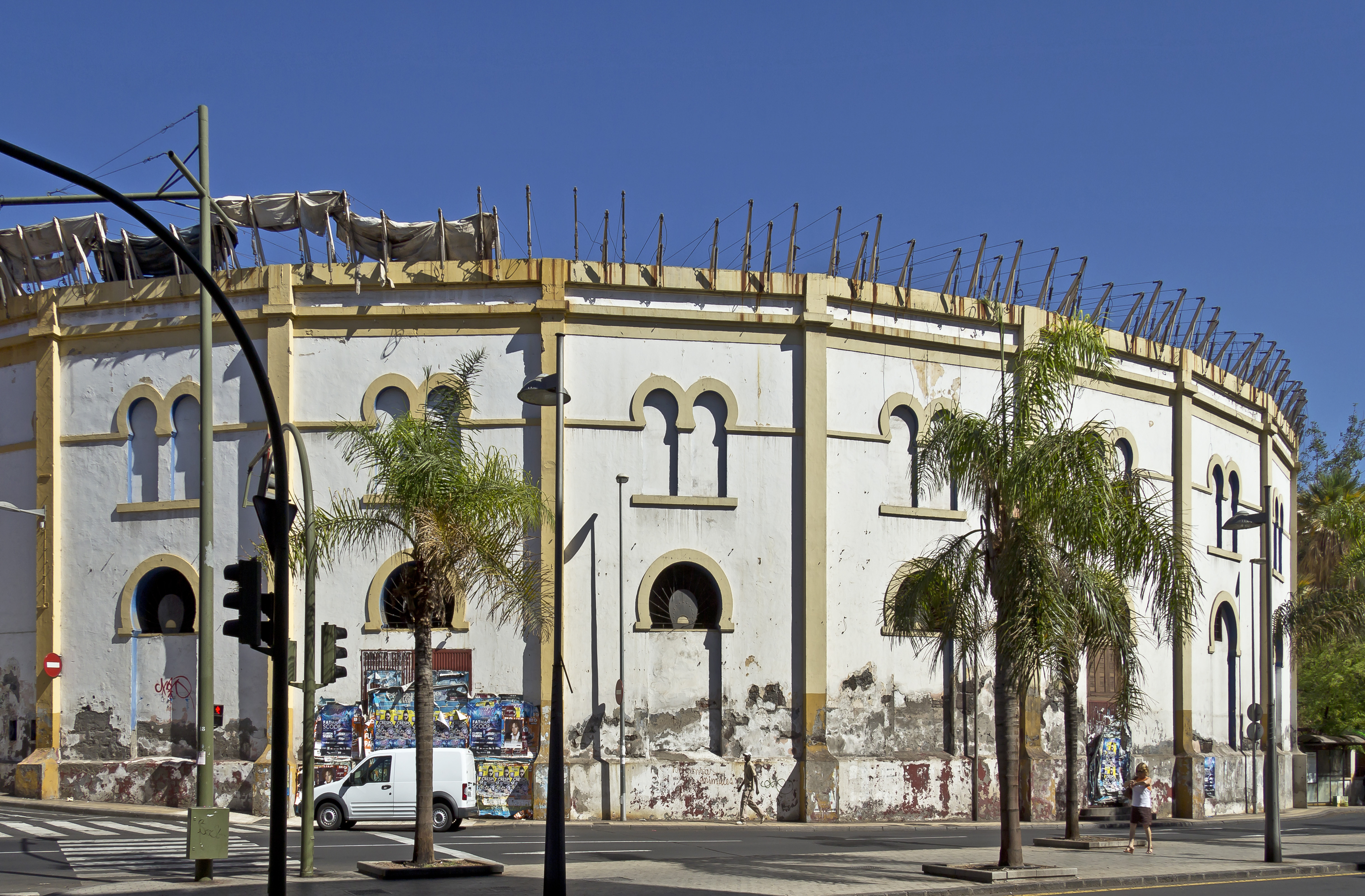
- The bullring in 2012
- Interactive map of the Santa Cruz Bullring area

General information
- Type: bullring
- Location: Santa Cruz de Tenerife, Spain
- Coordinates: 28°28′N 16°16′W
- Opened: 30 April 1893
- Closed: 2003

Design and construction
- Architect: Antonio Pintor Ocete
- Designations: Bien de Interés Cultural (2014)

Santa Cruz Bullring (Spanish: Plaza de toros de Santa Cruz de Tenerife) is a bullring in Santa Cruz de Tenerife, Spain. Opened in 1893, it hosted its last bullfight in 1983. After being used for a variety of other events it closed in 2003, and is now vacant, with potential plans to redevelop it. It was listed as a Bien de Interés Cultural in 2014.

== Construction and operation ==
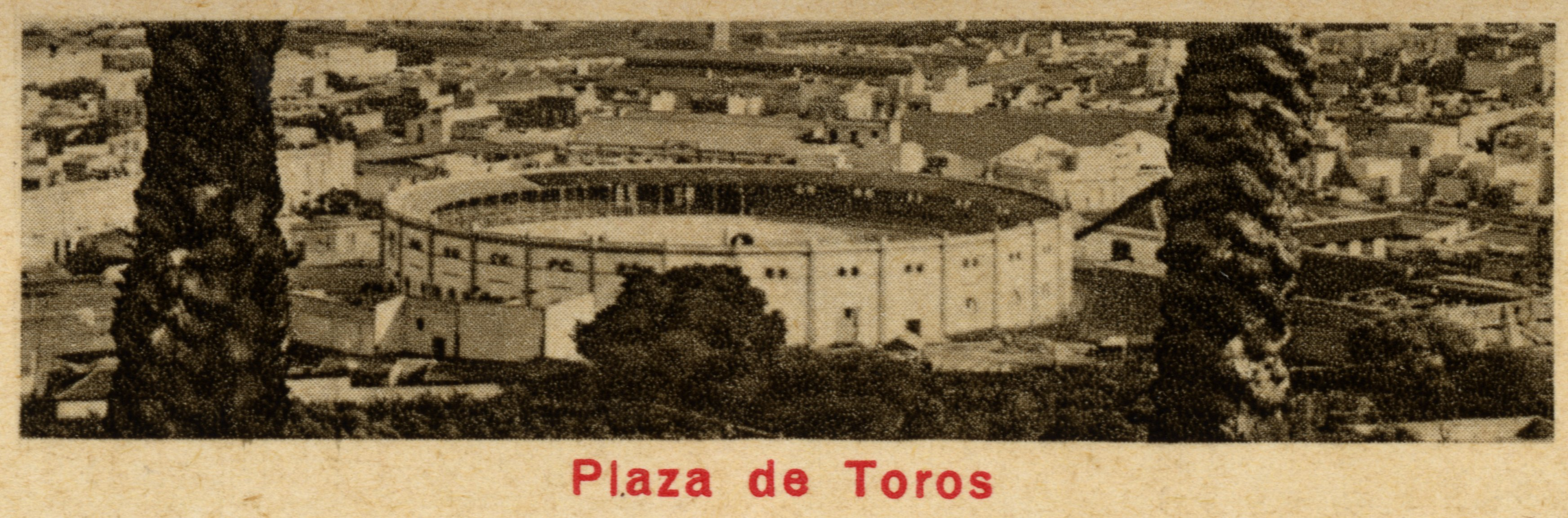
The bullring c. 1934

The bullring is located at the junction of Rambla de General Franco and Calle Horacio Nelson, near to La Paz, in Santa Cruz de Tenerife.

It was designed by Antonio Pintor Ocete, and constructed in 1892-93 with a capacity of 6,800 people. Its inauguration was on 30 April 1893. The Mudéjar-style facade is in the shape of a polygon, with 32 sides, and the building has a diameter of 80 metres (260 ft), of which 48 metres (157 ft) is the bullring. The ring has a central tower. The structure uses iron rather than wood for the framework, due to a municipal regulation at the time, with the facade, ring and sties constructed of masonry, with stone (from the site itself) used for the stairs and seating.

Its construction was controversial, particularly as another bullring had already been constructed in nearby La Laguna in 1891. In 1924 it had a major fire, and reopened 3 years later. At its peak it drew crowds of 8,000, and it hosted matadors such as Luis Mazzantini, and Eguía and Antonio Moreno Fernández ‘Lagartijillo’. There was a proposal to demolish in it 1947, which did not happen.

The last bull fight was on 18 December 1983, and bullfighting was banned in the Canary Islands in 1991. It was subsequently used for carnival events, boxing, wrestling, and as a concert venue, including concerts by Celia Cruz, Rubén Blades, and Mecano o Jerry Luis Lewis. A blue and white awning was erected over the bullring in 1986, which collapsed a few years later with no casualties.

== Closure ==
The bullring fully closed around 2003 due to the introduction of new security rules for public event venues.

In 1986, plans existed to turn it into a 10,000 seater modern stadium, however this did not take place. A competition of 35 architects took place in July 2008 to redevelop the bullring, The winning design by Antonio del Pozo Mozo, his son Cesar, and Carlos Bernal Limiñana would have preserved the facade, with modern shops and offices inside the structure, along with green space.

In 2014 it received Bien de Interés Cultural status as part of an expansion of the protection of the Barrio de los Hoteles region.

Ownership is divided into shares, over half of which are owned by the Hafez family. In 2018 they put forward two sets of plans to rebuild the site, including constructing an underground car park, leisure facilities, and homes, and pedestrianizing the street outside of the bullring.
