= Preben Rasmussen =

Danish boxer

Personal information
- Nationality: Danish
- Born: 14 November 1941 (age 83); Copenhagen, Denmark

Sport
- Sport: Boxing

Preben Rasmussen (born 14 November 1941) is a Danish boxer. He competed in the men's light welterweight event at the 1964 Summer Olympics.
