= Brian Maunsell (boxer) =

New Zealand boxer (1937–2021)

Personal information
- Full name: Brian Martin Maunsell
- Born: 5 October 1937; Christchurch, New Zealand
- Died: 3 August 2021 (aged 83); Christchurch, New Zealand
- Height: 1.66 m (5 ft 5 in)
- Weight: 63 kg (139 lb)

Sport
- Country: New Zealand
- Sport: Boxing

Achievements and titles
- National finals: Amateur light welterweight champion (1957, 1959, 1960, 1963); Professional lightweight champion (1965)

Brian Martin Maunsell (5 October 1937 – 3 August 2021) was a New Zealand boxer. He competed in the men's light welterweight division at the 1964 Summer Olympics in Tokyo.

Maunsell won the light welterweight division at the New Zealand national boxing championships four times, in 1957, 1959, 1960 and 1963, and was awarded the Jameson Belt for the most scientific boxer at the 1960 national championships. After the Tokyo Olympics, Maunsell turned professional and dropped to the lightweight division. In his professional career, from July 1965 to May 1966, he achieved six wins from seven bouts. He defeated Manny Santos on points in November 1965 to claim the New Zealand professional lightweight title, but lost the rematch six months later by a technical knockout.

Maunsell died in Christchurch on 3 August 2021, at the age of 83.
