= Georgi Hristakiev =

Bulgarian footballer

Personal information
- Full name: Georgi Georgiev Hristakiev
- Date of birth: 28 June 1944
- Place of birth: Stara Zagora, Bulgaria
- Date of death: 4 April 2016 (aged 71)
- Height: 1.80 m (5 ft 11 in)
- Position: Defender

Senior career*
Years	Team	Apps	(Gls)
1962–1963	Beroe Stara Zagora		
1963–1964	Chepinets Velingrad		
1964–1965	Spartak Plovdiv		
1965–1968	Lokomotiv Sofia	97	(0)
1969–1970	Slavia Sofia	12	(0)
1970–1971	Lokomotiv Plovdiv	24	(0)
1971–1975	Lokomotiv Sofia	85	(0)

International career
1967–1974	Bulgaria	14	(1)
Medal record
Representing Bulgaria
Men's football
Silver medal – second place	1968 Mexico	Team
- * Club domestic league appearances and goals

Georgi Hristakiev (Bulgarian: Георги Христакиев; 28 June 1944 – 4 April 2016) was a Bulgarian footballer who played as a defender. He competed at the 1968 Summer Olympics in Mexico City, where he won a silver medal with the Bulgarian team. At club level Hristakiev achieved prominence during his successful stint with Lokomotiv Sofia.
