= Om Prasad Pun =

Nepalese boxer

Om Prasad Pun magar
Personal information
- Nationality: Nepalese
- Born: 1942 (age 83–84)

Sport
- Sport: Boxing

Om Prasad Pun magar (born 1942) is a Nepalese boxer. He competed in the men's light welterweight event at the 1964 Summer Olympics.
