= Chang Pin-cheng =

Taiwanese boxer

Personal information
- Full name: 姜 平章, Pinyin: Jiāng Píng-zhāng
- Nationality: Taiwanese
- Born: 3 March 1937 (age 88)

Sport
- Sport: Boxing

Chang Pin-cheng (born 3 March 1937) is a Taiwanese boxer. He competed in the men's light welterweight event at the 1964 Summer Olympics.
