= Jaime Lozano (boxer) =

Mexican boxer (born 1950)

Personal information
- Full name: Jaime Lozano Aguilar
- Born: 7 May 1950 (age 75) Mexico City, Mexico

Sport
- Sport: Boxing

Jaime Lozano Aguilar (born 7 May 1950) is a Mexican boxer. He competed in the men's light welterweight event at the 1968 Summer Olympics.
