= Kostadin Tilev =

Bulgarian weightlifter

Personal information
- Nationality: Bulgarian
- Born: 16 July 1942 (age 82); Plovdiv, Bulgaria

Sport
- Sport: Weightlifting

Kostadin Tilev (Bulgarian: Костадин Тилев; born 16 July 1942) is a Bulgarian weightlifter. He competed in the men's lightweight event at the 1968 Summer Olympics.
