= Antoni Panyovski =

Bulgarian modern pentathlete

Personal information
- Born: 27 February 1942 (age 84) Sofia, Bulgaria

Sport
- Sport: Modern pentathlon

Antoni Panyovski (born 27 February 1942) is a Bulgarian modern pentathlete. He competed at the 1968 Summer Olympics.
