= Heiko Winter =

German boxer

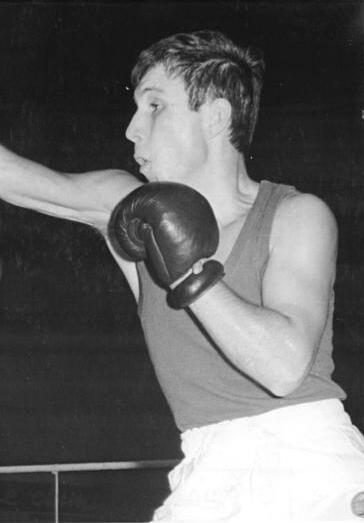
- Winter in 1964

Personal information
- Born: 27 February 1943 (age 82); Magdeburg, Germany

Sport
- Sport: Boxing

Heiko Winter (born 27 February 1943) is a German boxer. He competed in the men's light welterweight event at the 1964 Summer Olympics.
