= Roberto Amaya =

Argentine boxer

Personal information
- Born: 12 September 1944 (age 80); Buenos Aires, Argentina

Sport
- Sport: Boxing

Roberto Amaya (born 12 September 1944) is an Argentine boxer. He competed in the men's light welterweight event at the 1964 Summer Olympics.
