= Konstantin Sardzhev =

Bulgarian modern pentathlete

Personal information
- Born: 17 April 1943 (age 83) Sofia, Bulgaria

Sport
- Sport: Modern pentathlon

Konstantin Sardzhev (Bulgarian: Константин Сърджев; born 17 April 1943) is a Bulgarian modern pentathlete. He competed at the 1968 Summer Olympics.
