= Gopalan Ramakrishnan =

Malaysian boxer

Personal information
- Nationality: Malaysian
- Born: 17 November 1940 (age 84)

Sport
- Sport: Boxing

Gopalan Ramakrishnan (born 17 November 1940) is a Malaysian boxer. He competed in the men's light welterweight event at the 1964 Summer Olympics.
