= Petar Stoychev (boxer) =

Bulgarian boxer (born 1946)

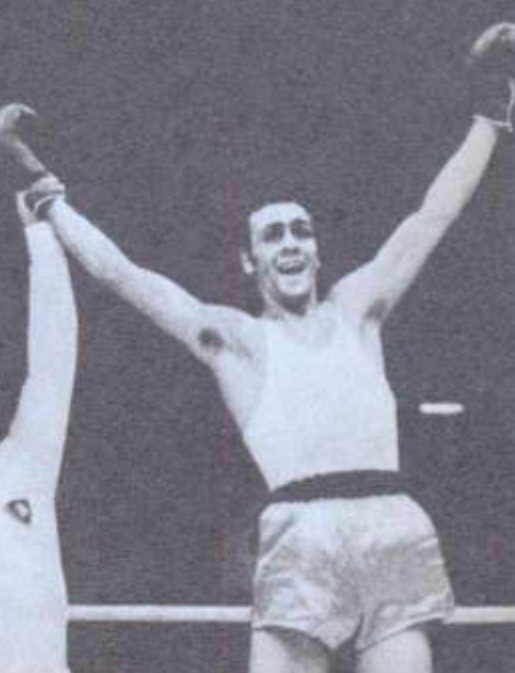
- Petar Stoicev during the 1969 European Boxing Championships.

Personal information
- Nationality: Bulgarian
- Born: 15 February 1946 (age 80) Plovdiv, Bulgaria

Sport
- Sport: Boxing

Petar Stoychev (born 15 February 1946) is a Bulgarian boxer. He competed in the men's light welterweight event at the 1968 Summer Olympics.
