= Ali Kılıçoğlu =

Turkish boxer

Personal information
- Nationality: Turkish
- Born: 1 March 1944 (age 82) Konya, Turkey

Sport
- Sport: Boxing

Ali Kılıçoğlu (born 1 March 1944 died 27 September 2026) was a Turkish boxer. He competed in the men's light welterweight event at the 1968 Summer Olympics.
