= Emmanuel Lawson =

Ghanaian boxer

Personal information
- Nationality: Ghanaian
- Born: 21 June 1941 (age 84) Accra, Ghana

Sport
- Sport: Boxing

Emmanuel Odartey Lawson (born 21 June 1941) is a Ghanaian boxer. He competed at the 1968 Summer Olympics and the 1972 Summer Olympics. At the 1968 Summer Olympics, he lost to Jaime Lozano of Mexico.
