= Enrique Regüeiferos =

Cuban boxer (1948–2002)

Personal information
- Full name: Enrique Regüeiferos Blanco
- Born: 15 July 1948 Havana, Cuba
- Died: 20 June 2002 (aged 53) Santiago de Cuba, Cuba
- Height: 168 cm (5 ft 6 in)
- Weight: 60 kg (132 lb)

Sport
- Sport: Boxing
- Weight class: Lightweight, Light welterweight
Medal record
Men's boxing
Representing Cuba
Olympic Games
Silver medal – second place	1968 Mexico City	Light welterweight -63.5 kg
Pan American Games
Gold medal – first place	1967 Winnipeg	Lightweight -60 kg
Gold medal – first place	1971 Cali	Light welterweight -63.5 kg
Central American and Caribbean Games
Bronze medal – third place	1966 San Juan	Lightweight -60 kg
Gold medal – first place	1970 Panamá	Light welterweight -63.5 kg

Enrique Regüeiferos Blanco (Note: In this Spanish name, the first or paternal surname is Regüeiferos and the second or maternal family name is Blanco.) (15 July 1948 – 20 June 2002) was a boxer from Cuba. He was born in Havana, Cuba. He competed for Cuba in the 1968 Summer Olympics held in Mexico City, Mexico in the light welterweight event where he finished in second place.
