= Arto Nilsson =

Finnish boxer (1948–2019)

Medal record

Men's Boxing

Representing Finland

Olympic Games
Bronze medal – third place	1968 Mexico City	Light welterweight

Arto Harald Nilsson (19 March 1948, Helsinki – 11 July 2019) was a boxer from Finland.

He competed for Finland in the 1968 Summer Olympics held in Mexico City, Mexico in the light welterweight event where he finished in third place.

== 1968 Olympic results ==
Below is the record of Arto Nilsson, a Finnish light welterweight boxer who competed at the 1968 Mexico City Olympics:

- Round of 64: bye
- Round of 32: defeated John Olulu (Kenya) by decision, 5-0
- Round of 16: defeated Gert Puzicha (West Germany) by decision, 3-2
- Quarterfinal: defeated Petar Stoitchev (Bulgaria) referee stopped contest
- Semifinal: lost to Jerzy Kulej (Poland) by decision, 0-5 (was awarded bronze medal)
