= Antoniu Vasile =

Romanian boxer (born 1942)

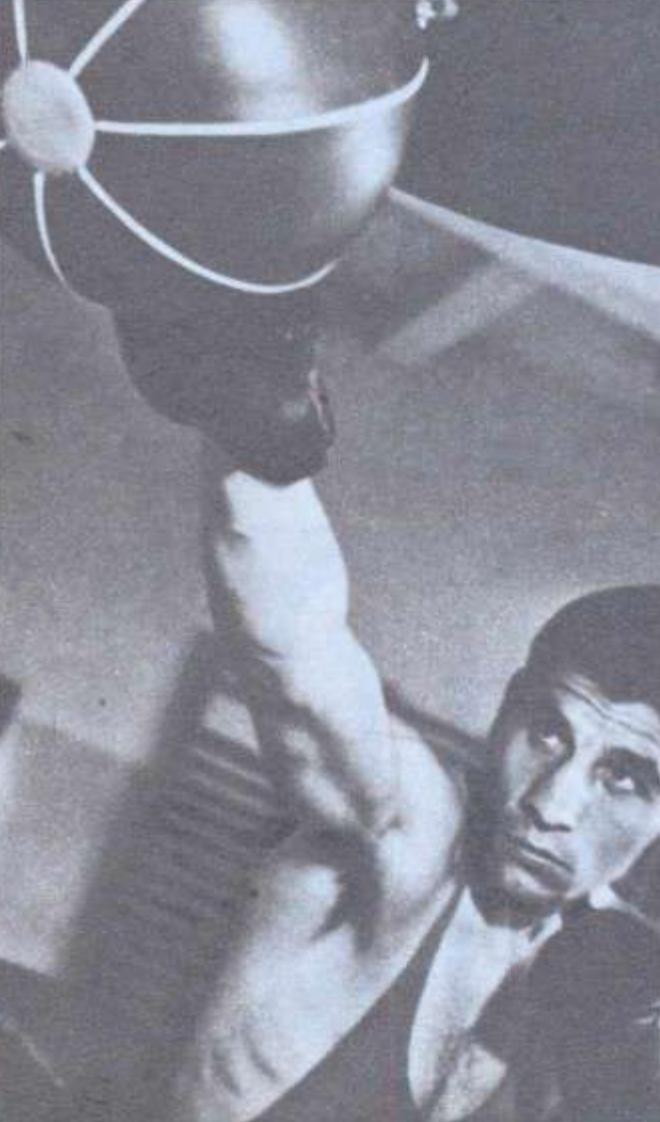

Personal information
- Nationality: Romanian
- Born: 27 August 1942 (age 83) Brăila, Romania

Sport
- Sport: Boxing
Medal record
Representing Romania
Romania National Amateur Boxing Championships
Gold medal – first place	1965 Bucharest	-60 kg
Gold medal – first place	1966 Bucharest	-60 kg
Gold medal – first place	1968 Bucharest	-63.5 kg
Gold medal – first place	1969 Bucharest	-63.5 kg
Gold medal – first place	1971 Bucharest	-60 kg
Gold medal – first place	1972 Bucharest	-60 kg
Silver medal – second place	1973 Bucharest	-67 kg
Silver medal – second place	1971 Bucharest	-71 kg
European Amateur Championships
Bronze medal – third place	1965 East Berlin	-60 kg
Silver medal – second place	1971 Bucharest	-60 kg

Antoniu Vasile (born 27 August 1942) is a Romanian boxer. He competed at the 1968 Summer Olympics and the 1972 Summer Olympics.
