= István Tóth (boxer) =

Hungarian boxer

Personal information
- Nationality: Hungarian
- Born: 25 April 1938; Miskolc, Hungary
- Died: 23 April 1999 (aged 60); Miskolc, Hungary

Sport
- Sport: Boxing

István Tóth (25 April 1938 – 23 April 1999) was a Hungarian boxer. He competed in the men's light welterweight event at the 1964 Summer Olympics.
