= Ermanno Fasoli =

Italian boxer (1943–2025)

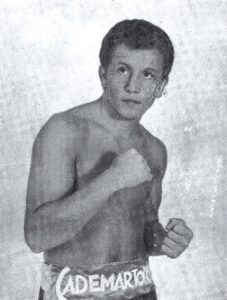
- Fasoli c. 1970

Personal information
- Born: 9 November 1943 Lecco, Italy
- Died: 9 November 2025 (aged 82)

Sport
- Sport: Boxing

Ermanno Fasoli (9 November 1943 – 9 November 2025) was an Italian boxer. He competed in the men's light welterweight event at the 1964 Summer Olympics.

Fasoli became the Italian Welterweight champion in 1964. He then defended his title four times, always winning on points with Piero Cerù, Italo Duranti, his third bout with Fanali, and former Italian lightweight champion Bruno Melissano. On March 6, 1971, he conceded a rematch to Piero Cerù, who snatched the national title from him in Rome by TKO in the seventh round.

Fasoli died on 9 November 2025, on his 82nd birthday.
