= Eddie Blay =

Ghanaian boxer (1937–2006)

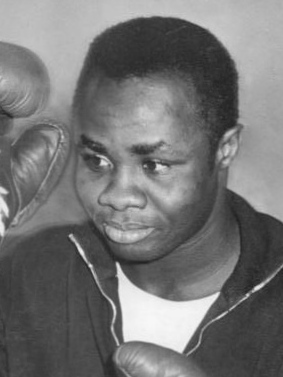
- Blay in 1965

Personal information
- Born: 9 November 1937 Accra, Gold Coast (now Ghana)
- Died: 15 October 2006 (aged 68) Accra, Ghana
- Height: 1.72 m (5 ft 8 in)
- Weight: 57 kg (126 lb)

Sport
- Sport: Boxing
Medal record
Representing Ghana
Olympic Games
Bronze medal – third place	1964 Tokyo	Light Welterweight
Commonwealth Games
Gold medal – first place	1962 Perth	Lightweight
Gold medal – first place	1966 Kingston	Welterweight

Edward Blay (9 November 1937 – 15 October 2006) was a Ghanaian boxer. He competed at the 1960 and 1964 Olympics and won a bronze medal in the light welterweight (63.5 kg) category in 1964. Blay was a two-time Commonwealth Games champion, in 1962 and 1966, and amateur boxer from the late 50s to 1968, and later briefly fought as a professional boxer. He lived in Italy for some time, and after returning to Ghana established the Sole Mio restaurant at Osu, Accra.

== 1960 Summer Olympic Games results ==
Below is the record of Eddie Blay, a Ghanaian lightweight boxer who competed at the 1960 Summer Olympic Games in Rome, Italy:

- Round of 32: defeated Gualberto Gutierrez (Uruguay) by decision, 4-1
- Round of 16: lost to Richard McTaggart (Great Britain) by decision, 0-5
