= Vladimír Kučera =

Czechoslovak boxer (1942–2007)

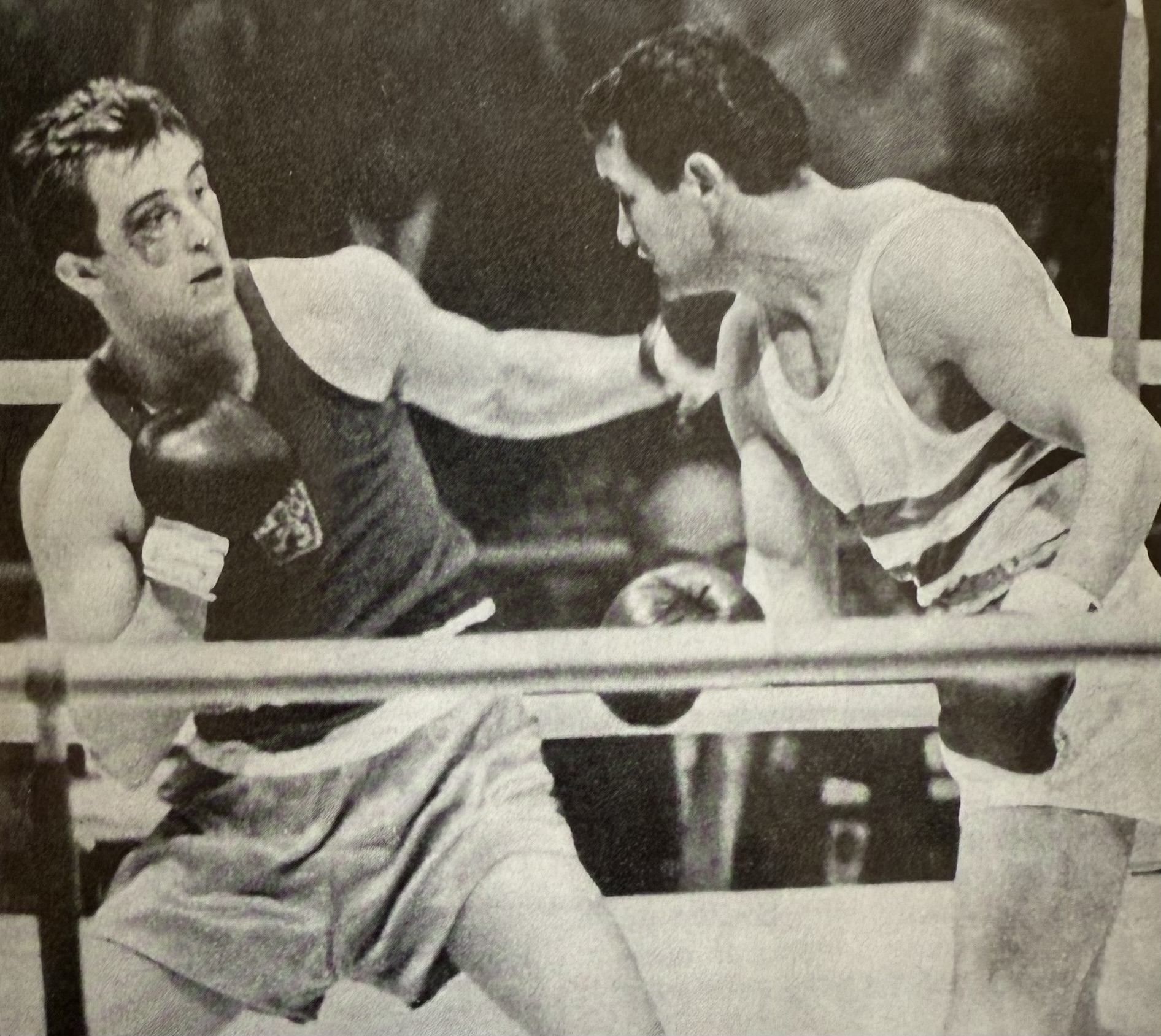
- Kucera (on the left) winning a boxing bout against Istvan Toth at the 1964 Tokyo Olympic Games

Personal information
- Nationality: Czechoslovak (Czech)
- Born: 29 September 1942 Přerov nad Labem, Protectorate of Bohemia and Moravia
- Died: 25 May 2007 (aged 64) Prague, the Czech Republic

Sport
- Sport: Boxing

Vladimír Kučera (29 September 1942 – 25 May 2007) was a Czechoslovak boxer and a seven-time national champion in the light-welterweight and welterweight divisions. During his international boxing career, he competed among others at the 1964 Summer Olympics in Tokyo, Japan and the 1968 Summer Olympics in Mexico City, Mexico.

At the 1964 Olympics, Kučera advanced to the quarterfinals and won his bout, but was forced to withdraw from the competition due to an eye injury, denying him at least a bronze medal.

In 1965, Kučera went on to win a bronze medal at the European Boxing Championships in Berlin. He was renowned for his high boxing intelligence and refined technical style, complemented by exceptional durability and hard chin. Over an illustrious career spanning 392 fights, he was knocked out only once, drew seven bouts, and recorded 360 victories.
