= Giambattista Capretti =

Italian boxer (1946–2016)

Personal information
- Nationality: Italian
- Born: 25 September 1946; Rovato, Italy
- Died: 26 September 2016 (aged 70)

Sport
- Sport: Boxing

Giambattista Capretti (25 September 1946 – 26 September 2016) was an Italian boxer. He competed at the 1968 Summer Olympics and the 1972 Summer Olympics.
