= Habib Galhia =

Tunisian boxer (1941–2011)

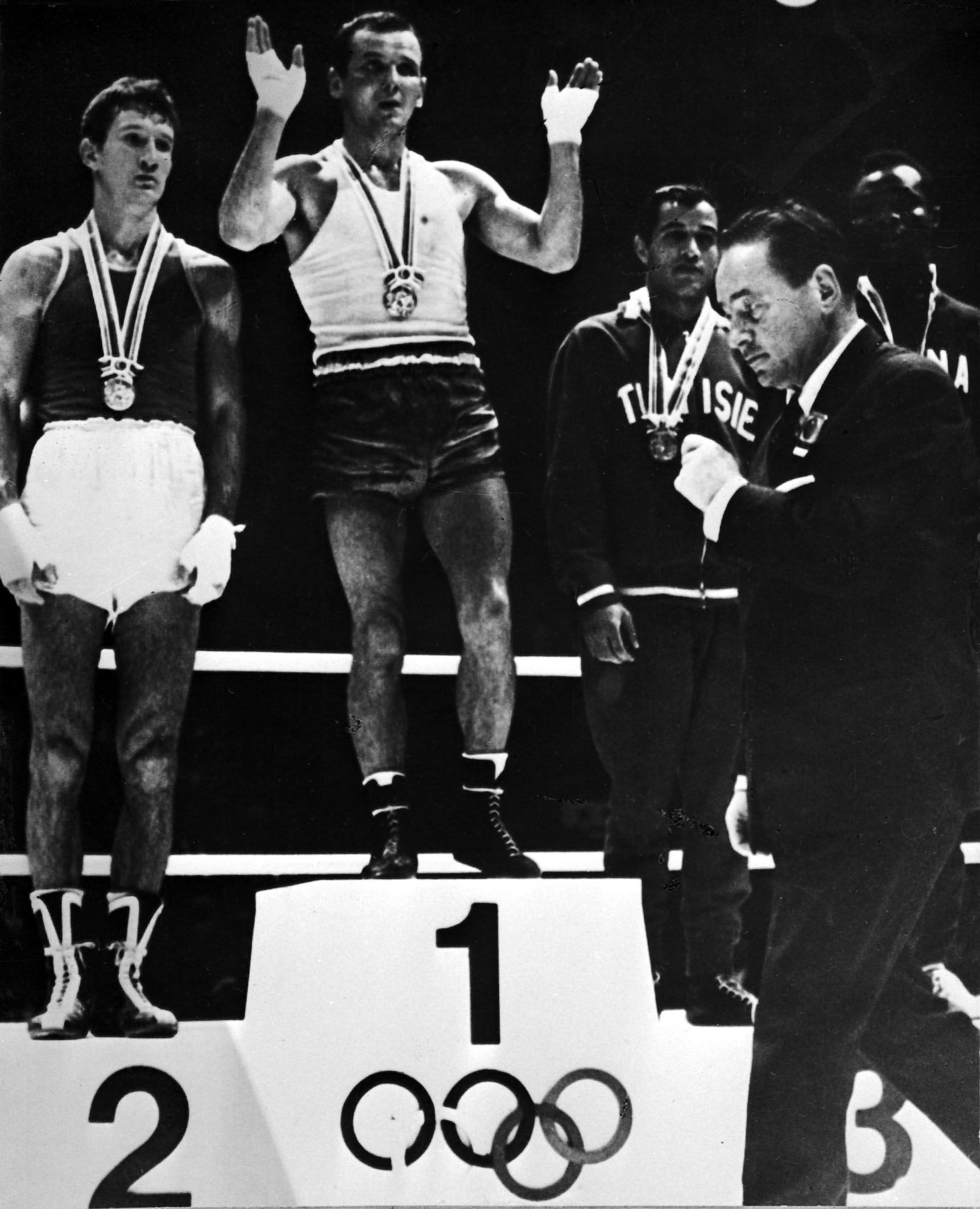
- Galhia (3rd from left) at the 1964 Olympics

Personal information
- Native name: حبيب قلحية
- Born: 14 May 1941 Kairouan, Tunisia
- Died: 25 December 2011 (aged 70) Sousse, Tunisia
- Height: 167 cm (5 ft 6 in)
- Weight: 63 kg (139 lb)

Sport
- Country: Tunisia
- Sport: Boxing

Olympic medal record

Men's Boxing
Bronze medal – third place	1964 Tokyo	Light Welterweight

Habib Galhia (Arabic: حبيب قلحية, May 14, 1941 – December 25, 2011) was a Tunisian boxer, who won the bronze medal in the men's Light Welterweight (67 kg) category at the 1964 Summer Olympics in Tokyo, Japan. He was the first Tunisian to win an Olympic medal.

Habib was the flag bearer for Tunisia in the opening ceremony and also competed at the 1968 Summer Olympics in Mexico City where he finished with the rank of 17T.

== 1964 Olympic results ==
Below is the record of Habib Galhia, a Tunisian light welterweight boxer who competed at the 1964 Tokyo Olympics:

- Round of 32: defeated Willem Gerlach (Netherlands) by decision, 3-2
- Round of16: defeated Om Presand Pun (Nepal) by knockout
- Quarterfinal: defeated Felix Betancourt (Cuba) by knockout
- Semifinal: lost to Yevgeny Frovlov (Soviet Union) by decision, 0-5 (was awarded bronze medal)
