= Yevgeny Frolov (boxer) =

Russian boxer (born 1941)

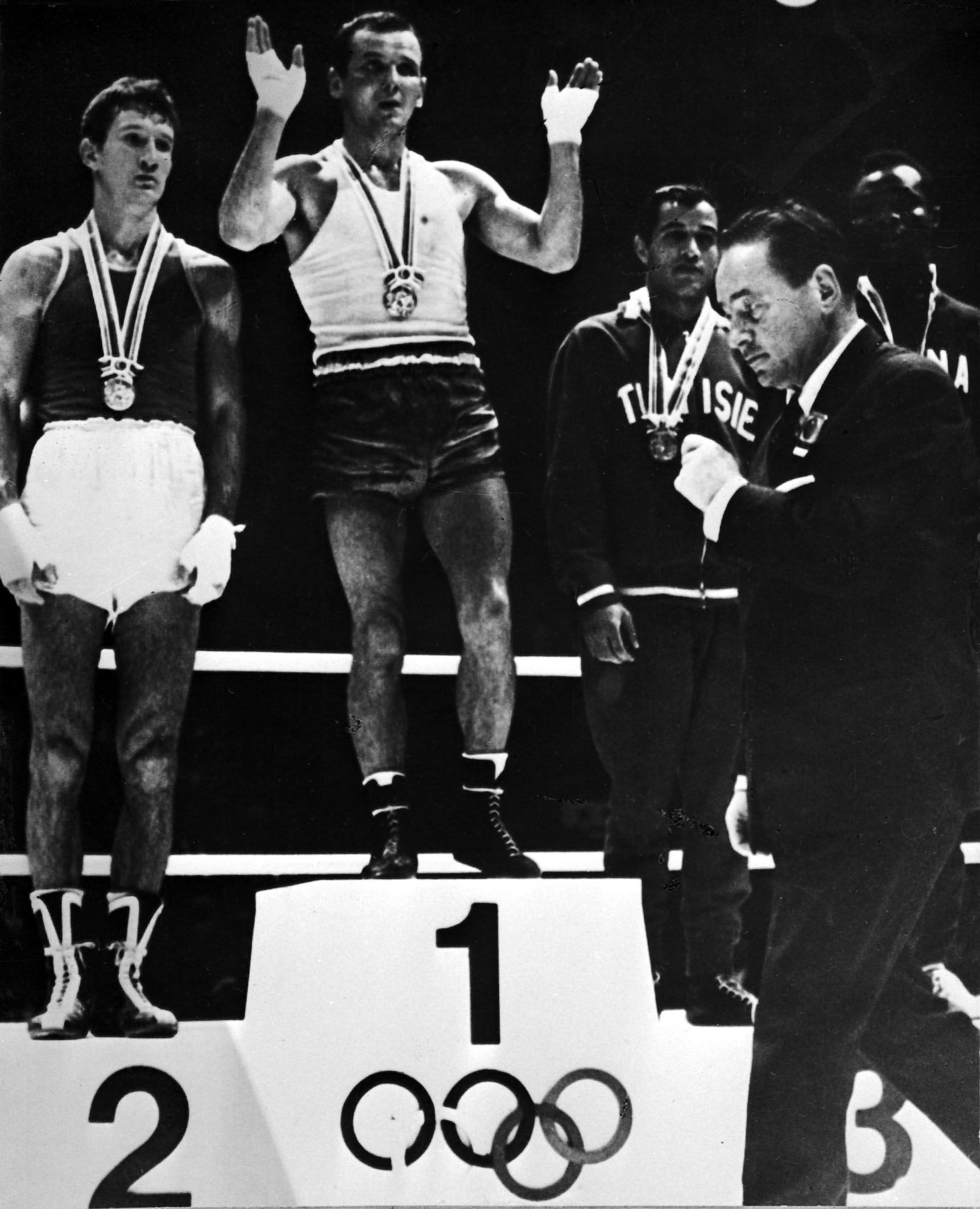
- Frolov (left) at the 1964 Olympics

Personal information
- Born: 14 June 1941 (age 85) Moscow, Russian SFSR, Soviet Union
- Height: 1.76 m (5 ft 9 in)
- Weight: 63 kg (139 lb)

Sport
- Sport: Boxing
- Club: Spartak Moscow
Medal record
Men's amateur boxing
Representing the Soviet Union
Olympic Games
Silver medal – second place	1964 Tokyo	Light welterweight

Yevgeny Vasilyevich Frolov (Russian: Евгений Васильевич Фролов; born 14 June 1941) is a retired Russian boxer. He competed at the 1964 and 1968 Olympics in the light welterweight division and finished in second and fifth place, respectively. Frolov was left-handed and his favorite strike was left jab. He retired with a record of 197 wins out of 212. He graduated from the Moscow State Forest University and then the All-Russian Academy of Foreign Trade and later worked at the Ministry of Foreign Trade.

== 1964 Olympic results ==
Below is the record of Yevgeny Frolov, a light welterweight boxer from the Soviet Union who competed at the 1964 Tokyo Olympics:

- Round of 64: bye
- Round of 32: defeated Brian Maunsell (New Zealand) referee stopped contest
- Round of 16: defeated Charley Ellis (United States) by decision, 3-2
- Quarterfinal: defeated Vladimir Kucera (Czechoslovakia) by walkover
- Semifinal: defeated Habib Galhia (Tunisia) by decision, 5-0
- Final: lost to Jerzy Kulej (Poland) by decision, 0-5 (was awarded silver medal)
