= United States at the 1968 Summer Olympics =

- Flag of the United States
- IOC code: USA (EUA used at these Games)
- NOC: United States Olympic Committee

in Mexico City
- Competitors: 357 (274 men and 83 women) in 18 sports
- Flag bearer: Janice-Lee Romary
- Medals Ranked 1st: Gold 45 Silver 28 Bronze 34 Total 107

Summer Olympics appearances (overview)
- 1896; 1900; 1904; 1908; 1912; 1920; 1924; 1928; 1932; 1936; 1948; 1952; 1956; 1960; 1964; 1968; 1972; 1976; 1980; 1984; 1988; 1992; 1996; 2000; 2004; 2008; 2012; 2016; 2020; 2024

Other related appearances
- 1906 Intercalated Games

The United States competed at the 1968 Summer Olympics in Mexico City. 357 competitors, 274 men and 83 women, took part in 167 events in 18 sports.

== Medalists ==
The United States finished first in the final medal rankings, with 45 gold and 107 total medals.

The following U.S. competitors won medals at the games. In the discipline sections below, the medalists' names are bolded.

Medal	Name	Sport	Event	Date
Gold	Jim Hines	Athletics	Men's 100 m	October 14
Gold	Randy Matson	Athletics	Men's shot put	October 14
Gold	Al Oerter	Athletics	Men's discs throw	October 15
Gold	Wyomia Tyus	Athletics	Women's 100 m	October 15
Gold	Tommie Smith	Athletics	Men's 200 m	October 16
Gold	Bob Seagren	Athletics	Men's pole vault	October 16
Gold	Willie Davenport	Athletics	Men's 110 m hurdles	October 17
Gold	David Johnson^{[a]} William Johnson^{[a]} Stephen Rerych; Don Schollander^{[a]} Mark Spitz; Michael Wall^{[a]} Ken Walsh; Zac Zorn	Swimming	Men's 4 × 100 m freestyle relay	October 17
Gold	Catie Ball; Ellie Daniel; Kaye Hall; Jan Henne^{[a]} Suzy Jones^{[a]} Susan Pedersen; Susan Shields^{[a]} Jane Swagerty^{[a]}	Swimming	Women's 4 × 100 m medley relay	October 17
Gold	Lee Evans	Athletics	Men's 400 m	October 18
Gold	Bob Beamon	Athletics	Men's long jump	October 18
Gold	Sue Gossick	Diving	Women's 3 m springboard	October 18
Gold	Bill Toomey	Athletics	Men's decathlon	October 19
Gold	Madeline Manning	Athletics	Women's 800 m	October 19
Gold	Don McKenzie	Swimming	Men's 100 m breaststroke	October 19
Gold	Jan Henne	Swimming	Women's 100 m freestyle	October 19
Gold	Charles Greene; Jim Hines; Mel Pender; Ronnie Smith	Athletics	Men's 4 × 100 m relay	October 20
Gold	Lee Evans; Ron Freeman; Larry James; Vincent Matthews	Athletics	Men's 4 × 400 m relay	October 20
Gold	Dick Fosbury	Athletics	Men's high jump	October 20
Gold	Margaret Bailes; Barbara Ferrell; Mildrette Netter; Wyomia Tyus	Athletics	Women's 4 × 100 m relay	October 20
Gold	Bernard Wrightson	Diving	Men's 3 m springboard	October 20
Gold	Charlie Hickcox	Swimming	Men's 200 m individual medley	October 20
Gold	Debbie Meyer	Swimming	Women's 400 m freestyle	October 20
Gold	Claudia Kolb	Swimming	Women's 200 m individual medley	October 20
Gold	Peter Barrett; Lowell North	Sailing	Star	October 21
Gold	George Friedrichs; Barton Jahncke; Gerald Schreck	Sailing	Dragon	October 21
Gold	Doug Russell	Swimming	Men's 100 m butterfly	October 21
Gold	David Johnson^{[a]} William Johnson^{[a]} John Nelson; Stephen Rerych; Don Schollander; Mark Spitz; Andrew Strenk^{[a]} Michael Wall^{[a]}	Swimming	Men's 4 × 200 m freestyle relay	October 21
Gold	Debbie Meyer	Swimming	Women's 200 m freestyle	October 22
Gold	William Steinkraus	Equestrian	Individual jumping	October 23
Gold	Gary Anderson	Shooting	300 m rifle three position	October 23
Gold	Mike Burton	Swimming	Men's 400 m freestyle	October 23
Gold	Charlie Hickcox	Swimming	Men's 400 m individual medley	October 23
Gold	Kaye Hall	Swimming	Women's 100 m backstroke	October 23
Gold	Sharon Wichman	Swimming	Women's 200 m breaststroke	October 23
Gold	Carl Robie	Swimming	Men's 200 m butterfly	October 24
Gold	Debbie Meyer	Swimming	Women's 800 m freestyle	October 24
Gold	United States men's national basketball team: Mike Barrett; John Clawson; Don Dee; Calvin Fowler; Spencer Haywood; Bill Hosket; Jim King; Glynn Saulters; Charlie Scott; Mike Silliman; Ken Spain; Jo Jo White	Basketball	Men's tournament	October 25
Gold	Lillian Watson	Swimming	Women's 200 m backstroke	October 25
Gold	Claudia Kolb	Swimming	Women's 400 m individual medley	October 25
Gold	Ronnie Harris	Boxing	Lightweight	October 26
Gold	George Foreman	Boxing	Heavyweight	October 26
Gold	Mike Burton	Swimming	Men's 1500 m freestyle	October 26
Gold	Charlie Hickcox; Chet Jastremski^{[a]} Don McKenzie; Ronnie Mills^{[a]} Carl Robie^{[a]} Doug Russell; Don Schollander^{[a]} Ken Walsh	Swimming	Men's 4 × 100 m medley relay	October 26
Gold	Jane Barkman; Linda Gustavson; Jan Henne; Susan Pedersen	Swimming	Women's 4 × 100 m freestyle relay	October 26
Silver	George Woods	Athletics	Men's shot put	October 14
Silver	Barbara Ferrell	Athletics	Women's 100 m	October 15
Silver	Ervin Hall	Athletics	Men's 110 m hurdles	October 17
Silver	Larry James	Athletics	Men's 400 m	October 18
Silver	Larry Hough; Tony Johnson	Rowing	Coxless pair	October 18
Silver	Thomas Garrigus	Shooting	Trap	October 19
Silver	Ken Walsh	Swimming	Men's 100 m freestyle	October 19
Silver	Susan Pedersen	Swimming	Women's 100 m freestyle	October 19
Silver	Jim Ryun	Athletics	Men's 1500 m	October 20
Silver	Ed Caruthers	Athletics	Men's high jump	October 20
Silver	Greg Buckingham	Swimming	Men's 200 m individual medley	October 20
Silver	Linda Gustavson	Swimming	Women's 400 m freestyle	October 20
Silver	Susan Pedersen	Swimming	Women's 200 m individual medley	October 20
Silver	Rick Sanders	Wrestling	Freestyle 52 kg	October 20
Silver	Donald Behm	Wrestling	Freestyle 57 kg	October 20
Silver	Kevin Freeman; Michael Page; Michael Plumb; James C. Wofford	Equestrian	Team eventing	October 21
Silver	John Writer	Shooting	50 m rifle three position	October 21
Silver	Mark Spitz	Swimming	Men's 100 m butterfly	October 21
Silver	Ellie Daniel	Swimming	Women's 100 m butterfly	October 21
Silver	Charlie Hickcox	Swimming	Men's 100 m backstroke	October 22
Silver	Jan Henne	Swimming	Women's 200 m freestyle	October 22
Silver	Gary Hall Sr.	Swimming	Men's 400 m individual medley	October 23
Silver	Don Schollander	Swimming	Men's 200 m freestyle	October 24
Silver	Pam Kruse	Swimming	Women's 800 m freestyle	October 24
Silver	Mitch Ivey	Swimming	Men's 200 m backstroke	October 25
Silver	Lynn Vidali	Swimming	Women's 400 m individual medley	October 25
Silver	Al Robinson	Boxing	Featherweight	October 26
Silver	John Kinsella	Swimming	Men's 1500 m freestyle	October 26
Bronze	Charles Greene	Athletics	Men's 100 m	October 14
Bronze	Tom Farrell	Athletics	Men's 800 m	October 15
Bronze	John Carlos	Athletics	Men's 200 m	October 16
Bronze	George Young	Athletics	Men's 3000 m steeplechase	October 16
Bronze	Larry Young	Athletics	Men's 50 km walk	October 17
Bronze	Ron Freeman	Athletics	Men's 400 m	October 18
Bronze	Ralph Boston	Athletics	Men's long jump	October 18
Bronze	Keala O'Sullivan	Diving	Women's 3 m springboard	October 18
Bronze	Bill Maher; John Nunn	Rowing	Double sculls	October 19
Bronze	Mark Spitz	Swimming	Men's 100 m freestyle	October 19
Bronze	Linda Gustavson	Swimming	Women's 100 m freestyle	October 19
Bronze	Sharon Wichman	Swimming	Women's 100 m breaststroke	October 19
Bronze	Joseph Dube	Weightlifting	+90 kg	October 19
Bronze	Jim Henry	Diving	Men's 3 m springboard	October 20
Bronze	John Ferris	Swimming	Men's 200 m individual medley	October 20
Bronze	Jan Henne	Swimming	Women's 200 m individual medley	October 20
Bronze	Michael Page	Equestrian	Individual eventing	October 21
Bronze	Ross Wales	Swimming	Men's 100 m butterfly	October 21
Bronze	Susan Shields	Swimming	Women's 100 m butterfly	October 21
Bronze	Ronnie Mills	Swimming	Men's 100 m backstroke	October 22
Bronze	Brian Job	Swimming	Men's 200 m breaststroke	October 22
Bronze	Jane Barkman	Swimming	Women's 200 m freestyle	October 22
Bronze	Ann Peterson	Diving	Women's 10 m platform	October 23
Bronze	Jane Swagerty	Swimming	Women's 100 m backstroke	October 23
Bronze	Harlan Marbley	Boxing	Light flyweight	October 24
Bronze	Jim Wallington	Boxing	Light welterweight	October 24
Bronze	John Baldwin	Boxing	Light middleweight	October 24
Bronze	Alfred Jones	Boxing	Middleweight	October 24
Bronze	John Nelson	Swimming	Men's 200 m freestyle	October 24
Bronze	John Ferris	Swimming	Men's 200 m butterfly	October 24
Bronze	Ellie Daniel	Swimming	Women's 200 m butterfly	October 24
Bronze	Jack Horsley	Swimming	Men's 200 m backstroke	October 25
Bronze	Kaye Hall	Swimming	Women's 200 m backstroke	October 25
Bronze	Edwin Young	Diving	Men's 10 m platform	October 26

Medals by sport
Sport	1st place, gold medalist(s)	2nd place, silver medalist(s)	3rd place, bronze medalist(s)	Total
Swimming	21	15	16	**52**
Athletics	15	6	7	**28**
Boxing	2	1	4	**7**
Diving	2	0	4	**6**
Sailing	2	0	0	**2**
Shooting	1	2	0	**3**
Equestrian	1	1	1	**3**
Basketball	1	0	0	**1**
Wrestling	0	2	0	**2**
Rowing	0	1	1	**2**
Weightlifting	0	0	1	**1**
Total	45	28	34	107

Medals by day
Day	Date	1st place, gold medalist(s)	2nd place, silver medalist(s)	3rd place, bronze medalist(s)	Total
1	October 13	0	0	0	**0**
2	October 14	2	1	1	**4**
3	October 15	2	1	1	**4**
4	October 16	2	0	2	**4**
5	October 17	3	1	1	**5**
6	October 18	3	2	3	**8**
7	October 19	4	3	5	**12**
8	October 20	8	7	3	**18**
9	October 21	4	4	3	**11**
10	October 22	1	2	3	**6**
11	October 23	6	1	2	**9**
12	October 24	2	2	7	**11**
13	October 25	3	2	2	**7**
14	October 26	5	2	1	**8**
15	October 27	0	0	0	**0**
Total		45	28	34	107

Medals by gender
Gender	1st place, gold medalist(s)	2nd place, silver medalist(s)	3rd place, bronze medalist(s)	Total
Male	30	20	24	**74**
Female	15	8	10	**33**
Total	45	28	34	107

Multiple medalists
Name	Sport	1st place, gold medalist(s)	2nd place, silver medalist(s)	3rd place, bronze medalist(s)	Total
Jan Henne	Swimming	3	1	1	**5**
Charlie Hickcox	Swimming	3	1	0	**4**
Don Schollander	Swimming	3	1	0	**4**
Susan Pedersen	Swimming	2	2	0	**4**
Mark Spitz	Swimming	2	1	1	**4**
Debbie Meyer	Swimming	3	0	0	**3**
Ken Walsh	Swimming	2	1	0	**3**
Kaye Hall	Swimming	2	0	1	**3**
Ellie Daniel	Swimming	1	1	1	**3**
Linda Gustavson	Swimming	1	1	1	**3**
Mike Burton	Swimming	2	0	0	**2**
Lee Evans	Athletics	2	0	0	**2**
Jim Hines	Athletics	2	0	0	**2**
David Johnson	Swimming	2	0	0	**2**
William Johnson	Swimming	2	0	0	**2**
Claudia Kolb	Swimming	2	0	0	**2**
Don McKenzie	Swimming	2	0	0	**2**
Stephen Rerych	Swimming	2	0	0	**2**
Carl Robie	Swimming	2	0	0	**2**
Doug Russell	Swimming	2	0	0	**2**
Wyomia Tyus	Athletics	2	0	0	**2**
Michael Wall	Swimming	2	0	0	**2**
Barbara Ferrell	Athletics	1	1	0	**2**
Larry James	Athletics	1	1	0	**2**
Jane Barkman	Swimming	1	0	1	**2**
Ron Freeman	Athletics	1	0	1	**2**
Charles Greene	Athletics	1	0	1	**2**
Ronnie Mills	Swimming	1	0	1	**2**
John Nelson	Swimming	1	0	1	**2**
Susan Shields	Swimming	1	0	1	**2**
Jane Swagerty	Swimming	1	0	1	**2**
Sharon Wichman	Swimming	1	0	1	**2**
Michael Page	Equestrian	0	1	1	**2**
John Ferris	Swimming	0	0	2	**2**

^{a} Athletes who participated in the heats only.

== Athletics ==
Key

- Note–Ranks given for track events are within the athlete's heat only
- Q = Qualified for the next round
- q = Qualified for the next round as a fastest loser or, in field events, by position without achieving the qualifying target

Track and road events
Men

Athlete	Event	Heat		Quarterfinal		Semifinal		Final	
Athlete	Event	Time	Rank	Time	Rank	Time	Rank	Time	Rank
Charles Greene	100 m	10.09	1 Q	10.02	1 Q	10.13	1 Q	10.07	3rd place, bronze medalist(s)
Jim Hines	100 m	10.26	1 Q	10.14	2 Q	10.08	1 Q	9.95 WR	1st place, gold medalist(s)
Mel Pender	100 m	10.35	2 Q	10.16	2 Q	10.21	4 Q	10.17	6
John Carlos	200 m	20.54	1 Q	20.69	1 Q	20.12 OR	1 Q	20.10	3rd place, bronze medalist(s)
Larry Questad	200 m	20.75	1 Q	20.57	2 Q	20.48	3 Q	20.62	6
Tommie Smith	200 m	20.37	1 Q	20.28	1 Q	20.14	1 Q	19.83 WR	1st place, gold medalist(s)
Lee Evans	400 m	45.40	1 Q	45.54	2 Q	44.83 OR	1 Q	43.86 WR	1st place, gold medalist(s)
Ron Freeman	400 m	45.67	3 Q	45.31	1 Q	45.47	2 Q	44.41	3rd place, bronze medalist(s)
Larry James	400 m	45.83	3 Q	45.77	2 Q	44.88	2 Q	43.97	2nd place, silver medalist(s)
Wade Bell	800 m	1:51.5	5	—N/a		Did not advance			
Tom Farrell	800 m	1:47.9	2 Q	—N/a		1:46.1	4 Q	1:45.4	3rd place, bronze medalist(s)
Ron Kutschinski	800 m	1:47.6	3 q	—N/a		1:47.3	5	Did not advance	
Marty Liquori	1500 m	3:52.78	1 Q	—N/a		3:52.17	4 Q	4:18.22	12
Jim Ryun	1500 m	3:45.80	1 Q	—N/a		3:51.25	1 Q	3:37.89	2nd place, silver medalist(s)
Tom Von Ruden	1500 m	3:59.15	1 Q	—N/a		3:54.12	3 Q	3:49.27	9
Jack Bacheler	5000 m	14:31.0	4 Q	—N/a				DNS	
Bob Day	5000 m	14:23.2	6	—N/a				Did not advance	
Lou Scott	5000 m	15:13.6	11	—N/a				Did not advance	
Tom Laris	10,000 m	—N/a						30:26.2	16
Van Nelson	10,000 m	—N/a						31:40.2	28
Tracy Smith	10,000 m	—N/a						30:14.6	11
Leon Coleman	110 m hurdles	13.77	1 Q	—N/a		13.54	2 Q	13.67	4
Willie Davenport	110 m hurdles	13.65	1 Q	—N/a		13.53	1 Q	13.33 OR	1st place, gold medalist(s)
Ervin Hall	110 m hurdles	13.75	1 Q	—N/a		13.38 OR	1 Q	13.42	2nd place, silver medalist(s)
Geoff Vanderstock	400 m hurdles	—N/a		50.6	2 Q	49.2	2 Q	49.0	4
Ron Whitney	400 m hurdles	—N/a		49.0 OR	1 Q	49.2	2 Q	49.2	6
Conrad Nightingale	3000 m steeplechase	9:13.23	6	—N/a				Did not advance	
Bill Reilly	3000 m steeplechase	9:10.35	5	—N/a				Did not advance	
George Young	3000 m steeplechase	9:01.49	2 Q	—N/a				8:51.86	3rd place, bronze medalist(s)
Charles Greene; Jim Hines; Mel Pender; Ronnie Ray Smith	4 × 100 m relay	38.8	2 Q	—N/a		38.6	2 Q	38.24 WR	1st place, gold medalist(s)
Lee Evans; Ron Freeman; Larry James; Vincent Matthews	4 × 400 m relay	3:00.71	1 Q	—N/a				2:56.10 WR	1st place, gold medalist(s)
Ron Daws	Marathon	—N/a						2:33:53	22
Kenny Moore	Marathon	—N/a						2:29:49	14
George Young	Marathon	—N/a						2:31:15	16
Tom Dooley	20 km walk	—N/a						1:40:08	17
Rudy Haluza	20 km walk	—N/a						1:35:00.2	4
Ron Laird	20 km walk	—N/a						1:44:38	25
Goetz Klopfer	50 km walk	—N/a						4:39:13.8	10
Dave Romansky	50 km walk	—N/a						5:38:03.4	26
Larry Young	50 km walk	—N/a						4:31:55.4	3rd place, bronze medalist(s)

Women

Athlete	Event	Heat		Quarterfinal		Semifinal		Final	
Athlete	Event	Time	Rank	Time	Rank	Time	Rank	Time	Rank
Margaret Bailes	100 m	11.2	1 Q	11.3	2 Q	11.5	3 Q	11.3	5
Barbara Ferrell	100 m	11.2	1 Q	11.1	1 Q	11.3	2 Q	11.1	2nd place, silver medalist(s)
Wyomia Tyus	100 m	11.2	1 Q	11.0	1 Q	11.3	1 Q	11.0 WR	1st place, gold medalist(s)
Margaret Bailes	200 m	23.1	2 Q	—N/a		22.9	3 Q	23.1	7
Barbara Ferrell	200 m	22.9	1 Q	—N/a		22.8 OR	1 Q	22.9	4
Wyomia Tyus	200 m	23.4	1 Q	—N/a		23.1	2 Q	23.0	6
Lois Anne Drinkwater	400 m	54.5	4 Q	—N/a		57.3	8	Did not advance	
Jarvis Scott	400 m	53.5	2 Q	—N/a		53.2	4 Q	52.7	6
Esther Stroy	400 m	53.5	2 Q	—N/a		54.3	5	Did not advance	
Doris Brown	800 m	2:09.5	2 Q	—N/a		2:05.2	2 Q	2:03.9	5
Francie Kraker	800 m	2:07.3	5	—N/a		Did not advance			
Madeline Manning	800 m	2:08.7	1 Q	—N/a		2:05.8	1 Q	2:00.9 OR	1st place, gold medalist(s)
Judy Dyer	80 m hurdles	10.9	3 Q	—N/a		10.8	6	Did not advance	
Mamie Rallins	80 m hurdles	10.6	1 Q	—N/a		10.6	5	Did not advance	
Patty Van Wolvelaere	80 m hurdles	10.6	1 Q	—N/a		10.6	2 Q	10.5	4
Margaret Bailes; Barbara Ferrell; Mildrette Netter; Wyomia Tyus	4 × 100 m relay	—N/a				43.4	1 Q	42.88 WR	1st place, gold medalist(s)

Field events
Men

Athlete	Event	Qualification		Final	
Athlete	Event	Result	Rank	Result	Rank
Bob Beamon	Long jump	8.19	2 Q	8.90 WR	1st place, gold medalist(s)
Ralph Boston	Long jump	8.27 OR	1 Q	8.16	3rd place, bronze medalist(s)
Charles Mays	Long jump	7.85	6 Q	DNS	
Dave Smith	Triple jump	15.75	21	Did not advance	
Norman Tate	Triple jump	15.84	17	Did not advance	
Art Walker	Triple jump	16.49	3 Q	17.12 NAR	4
Reynaldo Brown	High jump	2.12	9 q	2.14	5
Ed Caruthers	High jump	2.14	2 Q	2.22	2nd place, silver medalist(s)
Dick Fosbury	High jump	2.14	1 Q	2.24 OR	1st place, gold medalist(s)
Casey Carrigan	Pole vault	4.60	20	Did not advance	
John Pennel	Pole vault	4.90	1 Q	5.35	5
Bob Seagren	Pole vault	4.90	13 Q	5.40 OR	1st place, gold medalist(s)
Dave Maggard	Shot put	19.26	7 Q	19.43	5
Randy Matson'	Shot put	20.68 OR	1 Q	20.57	1st place, gold medalist(s)
George Woods	Shot put	19.79	3 Q	20.12	2nd place, silver medalist(s)
Gary Carlsen	Discus throw	60.36	3 Q	59.46	6
Al Oerter	Discus throw	59.36	6 Q	67.78 OR	1st place, gold medalist(s)
Jay Silvester	Discus throw	63.34 OR	1 Q	61.78	5
Frank Covelli	Javelin throw	73.04	21	Did not advance	
Mark Murro	Javelin throw	81.14	7 Q	80.08	9
Gary Stenlund	Javelin throw	73.52	20	Did not advance	
Ed Burke	Hammer throw	67.36	10 Q	65.72	12
Hal Connolly	Hammer throw	65.00	17	Did not advance	
Albert Hall	Hammer throw	65.70	14	Did not advance	

Women

Athlete	Event	Qualification		Final	
Athlete	Event	Result	Rank	Result	Rank
Martha Watson	Long jump	6.30	12 q	6.20	10
Willye White	Long jump	6.42	6 Q	6.08	11
Estelle Baskerville	High jump	NH		Did not advance	
Sharon Callahan	High jump	1.60	22	Did not advance	
Eleanor Montgomery	High jump	1.68	19	Did not advance	
Maren Seidler	Shot put	—N/a		14.86	11
Olga Connolly	Discus throw	—N/a		52.96	6
Carol Moseke	Discus throw	—N/a		48.28	14
RaNae Bair	Javelin throw	—N/a		53.14	11
Barbara Friedrich	Javelin throw	—N/a		53.44	9

Combined event – Men's decathlon

Athlete	Event	{100 m	LJ	SP	HJ	400 m	110 m H	DT	PV	JT	1500 m	Final	Rank
Rick Sloan	Result	11.2	6.72	14.07	2.10	51.0	15.5	45.58	4.85	49.90	4:44.0	7692	7
Rick Sloan	Points	756	761	733	942	762	797	792	1017	632	500	7692	7
Bill Toomey	Result	10.4	7.87	13.75	1.95	45.6	14.9	43.68	4.20	62.80	4:57.1	8193 OR	1st place, gold medalist(s)
Bill Toomey	Points	959	994	712	813	1021	859	757	859	795	424	8193 OR	1st place, gold medalist(s)
Tom Waddell	Result	11.3	7.47	14.45	2.01	51.2	15.3	43.73	4.50	63.70	5:04.5	7719	6
Tom Waddell	Points	733	915	756	865	753	817	758	932	806	384	7719	6

Combined event – Women's pentathlon

Athlete	Event	80 m H	SP	HJ	LJ	200 m	Final	Rank
Cathy Hamblin	Result	11.9	10.66	1.50	5.72	25.3	4330	24
Cathy Hamblin	Points	904	761	836	924	905	4330	24
Pat Winslow	Result	11.4	13.33	1.65	5.97	24.5	4877	6
Pat Winslow	Points	979	943	996	982	977	4877	6

== Basketball ==
Summary

Team	Event	Preliminary round								Semifinal / Pl.	Final / BM / Cl.	
Team	Event	Opposition Result	Opposition Result	Opposition Result	Opposition Result	Opposition Result	Opposition Result	Opposition Result	Rank	Opposition Result	Opposition Result	Rank
United States men	Men's tournament	Spain; W 81–46	Senegal; W 93–36	Philippines; W 96–75	Yugoslavia; W 73–58	Panama; W 95–60	Italy; W 100–61	Puerto Rico; W 61–56	1 Q	Brazil; W 75–63	Yugoslavia; W 65–50	1st place, gold medalist(s)

Roster

Name	Position	Height	Weight	Age	Team/School	Home Town
Mike Barrett	G	6'2"	155	25	U.S. Armed Forces (West Virginia Tech)	Richwood, West Virginia
John Clawson	G	6'4"	200	24	U.S. Armed Forces (Michigan)	Naperville, Illinois
Don Dee	F	6'7"	205	25	St. Mary of the Plains Col. (KS)	Kansas City, Missouri
Calvin Fowler	G	6'1"	170	27	Goodyear Wingfoots (St. Francis)	Akron, Ohio
Spencer Haywood	C	6'8"	225	19	Trinidad State Junior College	Detroit, Michigan
Bill Hosket	F	6'8"	220	21	Ohio State University	Dayton, Ohio
Jim King	F	6'7"	200	25	Goodyear Wingfoots (Okla. St.)	Akron, Ohio
Glynn Saulters	G	6'2"	175	23	Northeast Louisiana University	Lisbon, Louisiana
Charlie Scott	F	6'5"	180	19	University of North Carolina	New York, New York
Mike Silliman	F	6'6"	225	23	U.S. Armed Forces (Military Acd.)	Louisville, Kentucky
Ken Spain	C	6'9"	240	22	University of Houston	Houston, Texas
Jo Jo White	G	6'3"	195	21	University of Kansas	St. Louis, Missouri

The roster was led by future NBA All-Stars Haywood (19 years old) and White (21 years old), who led the team in scoring, with an average of 16.3 points and 11.7 points respectively. Haywood was the youngest player to make the USA basketball team at the time.

USA Basketball also selected 6 alternates to the U.S. squad; Tom Black of the Goodyear Wingfoots, George Carter of the US Army, Joe Hamilton of Christian College of the Southwest (TX) Junior College, Dan Issel of the University of Kentucky, Rick Mount of Purdue University and Charlie Paulk of Northeastern Oklahoma College.

Notably absent from the squad or the list of alternates were Pete Maravich, who led the NCAA in scoring during his sophomore season at LSU and would go on to set the NCAA career scoring record of 3,667 points, and reigning NCAA Champion and Player of the Year Lew Alcindor, who chose not to try out for the Olympic team in protest at the treatment of African Americans in the United States, stating that he was "trying to point out to the world the futility of winning the gold medal for this country and then coming back to live under oppression." Some of other NCAA stars, such as Elvin Hayes, Wes Unseld, Bob Lanier and Calvin Murphy, were also absent. As such, the Americans were severely weakened.

== Boxing ==
Future world champion George Foreman won a gold medal in the heavyweight division at the 1968 Mexico City Olympic Games. In the finals, 19-years-old Foreman defeated the Soviet Union's Jonas Čepulis; the referee stopped the fight in the second round. Čepulis, fighting out of Lithuania, was a 29-year-old veteran with a 12-year-long amateur career, having over 220 fights in his record, quite experienced, and 10 years older than Foreman. After winning the gold-medal fight, Foreman walked around the ring carrying a small U.S. flag and bowing to the crowd. Foreman maintained that earning the Olympic gold medal was the achievement he was most proud of in his boxing career, more so than either of his world titles.

Athlete	Event	Round of 64	Round of 32	Round of 16	Quarterfinal	Semifinal	Final	
Athlete	Event	Opposition Result	Opposition Result	Opposition Result	Opposition Result	Opposition Result	Opposition Result	Rank
Harlan Marbley	Light flyweight	—N/a	Bye	Temel (TUR); W 5–0	Ogun (NGR); W 5–0	Rodríguez (VEN); L 1–4	Did not advance	3rd place, bronze medalist(s)
David Vasquez	Flyweight	—N/a	Grasso (ITA); W 3–2	Rwabwogo (UGA); L 2–3	Did not advance			
Samuel Goss	Bantamweight	Bye	Gîju (ROU); L 0–5	Did not advance				
Al Robinson	Featherweight	—N/a	Cheshire (GBR); W RSC	Pelegrino (PHI); W KO	Kallaf Allah (RAU); W 5–0	Mihailov (BUL); W 4–1	Roldán (MEX); L DSQ	2nd place, silver medalist(s)
Ronnie Harris	Lightweight	Bye	Lee (KOR); W 5–0	Stacey (GBR); W 4–1	Muruli (UGA); W 5–0	Cuțov (ROU); W 5–0	Grudzień (POL); W 5–0	1st place, gold medalist(s)
Jim Wallington	Light welterweight	Bye	Cartagena (DOM); W RSC	Odhiambo (UGA); W 5–0	Kim (KOR); W 5–0	Regüeiferos (CUB); L 1–4	Did not advance	3rd place, bronze medalist(s)
Armando Muñíz	Welterweight	Bye	Kasprzyk (POL); W 4–1	Hebeisen (SUI); W 4–1	Guilloti (ARG); L 1–4	Did not advance		
John Baldwin	Light middleweight	—N/a	Bye	Stantien (TCH); W 5–0	Benítez (URU); W 5–0	Garbey (CUB); L 1–4	Did not advance	3rd place, bronze medalist(s)
Alfred Jones	Middleweight	—N/a	Quiñones (PER); W 5–0	Marrero (CUB); W 5–0	Georgiev (BUL); W 4–1	Finnegan (GBR); L 1–4	Did not advance	3rd place, bronze medalist(s)
Arthur Redden	Light heavyweight	—N/a	Bye	Stankov (BUL); L 1–4	Did not advance			
George Foreman	Heavyweight	—N/a		Trela (POL); W 4–1	Alexe (ROU); W RSC	Bambini (ITA); W KO	Čepulis (URS); W RSC	1st place, gold medalist(s)

== Canoeing ==
Men

Athlete	Event	Heat		Repechage		Semifinal		Final	
Athlete	Event	Time	Rank	Time	Rank	Time	Rank	Time	Rank
Andreas Weigand	C-1 1000 m	4:30.0	4 SF	—N/a		4:37.11	3 QF	4:50.42	8
William Gates; Malcolm Hickox	C-2 1000 m	4:37.0	7 SF	—N/a		4:33.49	6	Did not advance	
John Glair	K-1 1000 m	4:13.5	6 R	4:29.89	3 SF	4:08.31	4	Did not advance	
Paul Beachem; Peter Weigand	K-2 1000 m	4:15.0	7 R	4:00.04	4	Did not advance			
Lester Cutler; Ernst Heincke; Mervil Larson; John Pickett	K-4 1000 m	3:31.7	6 R	3:32.21	5	Did not advance			

Women

Athlete	Event	Heat		Semifinal		Final	
Athlete	Event	Time	Rank	Time	Rank	Time	Rank
Marcia Smoke	K-1 500 m	2:09.6	4 SF	2:12.67	1 QF	2:14.68	4
Sperry Rademaker; Marcia Smoke	K-2 500 m	2:08.9	4 SF	2:04.54	2 QF	2:02.97	7

Qualification Legend: QF = Qualify to final; SF = Qualify to semifinal; R = Qualify to repechage

== Cycling ==
Fifteen cyclists represented the United States in 1968.

=== Road ===
Athlete	Event	Time	Rank
Daniel Butler	Road race	DNF	
David Chauner	Road race	DNF	
John Howard	Road race	4:52:45	44
Wes Wessberg	Road race	DNF	
John Allis; John Howard; Oliver Martin; Jim Van Boven	Team time trial	2:24:13.50	20

=== Track ===
Pursuit

Athlete	Event	Qualifying		Quarterfinal	Semifinal	Final / BM	
Athlete	Event	Time	Rank	Opposition Result	Opposition Result	Opposition Result	Rank
David Brink	Individual	4:55.40	18	Did not advance			
David Chauner; Skip Cutting; Steve Maaranen; John Vande Velde	Team	4:32.87	17	Did not advance			

Sprint

Athlete	Event	Round 1	Repechage 1	Round 2	Repechage 2	Round 3	Repechage 3	Repechage final	Quarterfinal	Semifinal	Final / BM	
Athlete	Event	Opposition Result	Opposition Result	Opposition Result	Opposition Result	Opposition Result	Opposition Result	Opposition Result	Opposition Result	Opposition Result	Opposition Result	Rank
Tim Mountford	Individual	Baranycez (HUN), Loevesijn (NED); L	Kim (KOR), Galeano (COL); W 11.03	Morelon (FRA); L	Pedersen (DEN); W 11.31	Fredborg (DEN), Pkhakdze (URS); L	Kučírek (TCH), Johnson (AUS); W 10.79	Loevesijn (NED); L	Did not advance			=9
Jackie Simes	Individual	Goens (BEL), Sutherland (HBR); W 11.23	Bye	Kravtsov (URS), Van Lancker (BEL); W 10.72	Bye	Kučírek (TCH), Verzini (ITA); L	Fredborg (DEN), King (TTO); W 10.92	Barth (FRG); L	Did not advance			=9
Jack Disney; Charles Pranke	Tandem	Goens / Van Lancker (BEL); L	Clarke / Johnson (AUS); L	—N/a				Did not advance				=11

Time trial

Athlete	Event	Time	Rank
Jackie Simes	1000 m time trial	1:05.67	12

== Diving ==
Men

Athlete	Event	Preliminary		Final		Total	
Athlete	Event	Score	Rank	Score	Rank	Score	Rank
Jim Henry	3 m springboard	105.47	1 Q	52.65	5	158.09	3rd place, bronze medalist(s)
Keith Russell	3 m springboard	100.61	4 Q	51.14	8	151.75	4
Bernard Wrightson	3 m springboard	102.95	3 Q	67.20	1	170.15	1st place, gold medalist(s)
Rick Gilbert	10 m platform	86.70	17	Did not advance			
Keith Russell	10 m platform	101.38	3 Q	50.96	5	152.34	4
Edwin Young	10 m platform	99.98	4 Q	53.95	3	153.93	3rd place, bronze medalist(s)

Women

Athlete	Event	Preliminary		Final		Total	
Athlete	Event	Score	Rank	Score	Rank	Score	Rank
Sue Gossick	3 m springboard	97.32	3 Q	53.45	1	150.77	1st place, gold medalist(s)
Micki King	3 m springboard	98.17	1 Q	39.21	8	137.38	4
Keela O'Sullivan	3 m springboard	95.58	4 Q	49.65	2	145.23	3rd place, bronze medalist(s)
Lesley Bush	10 m platform	43.72	20	Did not advance			
Ann Peterson	10 m platform	52.14	2 Q	48.97	4	101.11	3rd place, bronze medalist(s)
Barbara Talmage	10 m platform	47.09	7 Q	40.20	10	87.29	10

== Equestrian ==
Dressage

Athlete	Horse	Event	Round 1		Round 2	
Athlete	Horse	Event	Score	Rank	Score	Rank
Kyra Downton	Cadet	Individual	657	21	Did not advance	
Edith Master	Helios	Individual	646	23	Did not advance	
Donnan Plumb	Attache	Individual	616	24	Did not advance	
Kyra Downton; Edith Master; Donnan Plumb	See above	Team	1919	8	—N/a	

Eventing

Athlete	Horse	Event	Dressage			Cross-country					Jumping			Total	
Athlete	Horse	Event	Time	Penalties	Rank	Stage B	Stage D	Penalties	Total	Rank	Obstacles	Time	Penalties	Penalties	Rank
Kevin Freeman	Chalan	Individual	6.22	77.01	14	-37.60	DSQ				EL				
Michael Page	Foster	Individual	6.25	107.51	40	-28.80	-30.40	-59.20	48.31	6	0	4.00	4.00	52.31	3rd place, bronze medalist(s)
Michael Plumb	Plain Sailing	Individual	6.17	63.00	5	-29.60	83.60	54.00	117.00	15	0	2.50	2.50	119.50	14
James C. Wofford	Kilkenny	Individual	6.24	101.51	34	-37.60	-33.60	-71.20	30.31	2	40	3.75	43.75	74.06	6
Kevin Freeman; Michael Page; Michael Plumb; James C. Wofford	See above	Team	—N/a	241.52	6	—N/a		-76.40	195.62	2	—N/a		50.25	245.87	2nd place, silver medalist(s)

Jumping

Athlete	Horse	Event	Round 1		Round 1		Total		Jump-off	
Athlete	Horse	Event	Faults	Rank	Faults	Rank	Faults	Rank	Time	Rank
Frank Chapot	San Lucas	Individual	4	=3	8	=4	12	=3	36.8	4
Kathryn Kusner	Untouchable	Individual	12	=21	Did not advance					
William Steinkraus	Snowbound	Individual	0	=1	4	=1	4	1st place, gold medalist(s)	Bye	
Frank Chapot	San Lucas	Team	11	—N/a	14	—N/a	25	—N/a	—N/a	
Mary Chapot	White Lightning	Team	27	—N/a	21	—N/a	48	—N/a	—N/a	
Kathryn Kusner	Untouchable	Team	25	—N/a	19.5	—N/a	44.5	—N/a	—N/a	
Total		Team	63	5	54.5	3	117.5	4	—N/a	

== Fencing ==
20 fencers represented the United States in 1968.

Men

Athlete	Event	Round 1			Round 2			Winners' bracket					Losers' bracket					Final round			Final barrage		
Athlete	Event	Round 1			Round 2			Round 1	Round 2	Round 3	Final / BM / Pl.		Round 1	Round 2	Round 3	Round 4	Round 5	Final round			Final barrage		
Athlete	Event	V	D	Rank	V	D	Rank	Opposition Result	Opposition Result	Opposition Result	Opposition Result	Rank	Opposition Result	Opposition Result	Opposition Result	Opposition Result	Opposition Result	V	D	Rank	V	D	Rank
David Micahnik	Individual épée	3	2	2 Q	1	4	6	Did not advance			—N/a		Did not advance										
Stephen Netburn	Individual épée	2	3	4 Q	3	2	2 Q	Constandt (BEL); W	Ladègaillerie (FRA); L	Did not advance	—N/a		Bye	Constandt (BEL); W	Lötscher (SUI); L	Did not advance							
Paul Pesthy	Individual épée	4	1	1 Q	2	3	5	Did not advance			—N/a		Did not advance										
Robert Beck; Daniel Cantillon; David Micahnik; Stephen Netburn; Paul Pesthy	Team épée	0	2	3	—N/a			Did not advance				=11	—N/a										
Larry Anastasi	Individual foil	3	1	1 Q	2	3	5	Did not advance			—N/a		Did not advance										
Jeffrey Checkes	Individual foil	2	3	4 Q	1	4	5	Did not advance			—N/a		Did not advance										
Herbert Cohen	Individual foil	1	3	4 Q	1	4	5	Did not advance			—N/a		Did not advance										
Larry Anastasi; Albie Axelrod; Jeffrey Checkes; Herbert Cohen; Uriah Jones	Team foil	0	2	3	—N/a			Did not advance				=11	—N/a										
Anthony Keane	Individual sabre	3	3	4 Q	1	4	5	Did not advance		—N/a			Did not advance				—N/a	Did not advance					
Alfonso Morales	Individual sabre	4	1	2 Q	3	2	2 Q	Calsrese (ITA); W	Nazlymov (HUN); L	—N/a			Bye	Panizza (FRA); L	Did not advance		—N/a	Did not advance					
Alex Orban	Individual sabre	4	2	3 Q	2	3	5	Did not advance		—N/a			Did not advance				—N/a	Did not advance					
Thomas Balla; Robert Blum; Anthony Keane; Alfonso Morales; Alex Orban	Team sabre	1	1	2 Q	—N/a				Italy; L 6–8	5th-8th semifinal West Germany; W 9–7	5th place final Poland; L 5–9	6	—N/a										

Women

Athlete	Event	Round 1			Round 2			Winners' bracket				Losers' bracket			Final round		
Athlete	Event	Round 1			Round 2			Round 1	Round 2	Final / BM / Pl.		Round 1	Round 2	Round 3	Final round		
Athlete	Event	V	D	Rank	V	D	Rank	Opposition Result	Opposition Result	Opposition Result	Rank	Opposition Result	Opposition Result	Opposition Result	V	D	Rank
Harriet King	Individual foil	3	2	2 Q	2	3	5	Did not advance		—N/a		Did not advance					
Veronica Smith	Individual foil	1	5	7	Did not advance					—N/a		Did not advance					
Jan York-Romary	Individual foil	3	2	4 Q	2	3	5	Did not advance		—N/a		Did not advance					
Harriet King; Maxine Mitchell; Sally Pechinsky; Veronica Smith; Jan York-Romary	Team foil	0	2	3	—N/a			Did not advance			=10	—N/a					

== Gymnastics ==
Men
All-around

Athlete	Event	Apparatus																								Total	
Athlete	Event	Floor exercise				Pommel horse				Rings				Vault				Parallel bars				Horizontal bar				Total	
Athlete	Event	C	V	Total	Rank	C	V	Total	Rank	C	V	Total	Rank	C	V	Total	Rank	C	V	Total	Rank	C	V	Total	Rank	Score	Rank
Kanati Allen	Individual	9.10	9.20	18.30	=34	9.00	8.55	17.55	=58	~~7.80~~	~~8.50~~	16.30	99	9.00	9.15	18.15	=54	~~7.70~~	~~9.05~~	16.75	=102	~~8.80~~	9.50	18.40	=56	105.45	80
Steve Cohen	Individual	~~8.85~~	~~8.75~~	17.60	=75	9.00	8.35	17.35	=67	9.30	9.60	18.90	=9	8.95	9.05	18.00	=68	9.10	9.50	18.60	=41	8.90	9.40	18.30	=56	108.75	46
Sid Freudenstein	Individual	9.15	9.50	18.65	=14	~~8.75~~	~~7.85~~	16.60	93	8.90	9.15	18.05	=44	9.10	~~8.95~~	18.05	=63	8.95	9.40	18.25	=63	8.95	9.45	18.40	53	108.00	57
Steve Hug	Individual	9.00	9.15	18.15	=42	9.30	9.40	18.70	19	8.80	9.10	17.90	=52	~~8.75~~	9.05	17.80	=83	9.05	9.40	18.45	=51	9.25	9.35	18.60	=39	109.60	36
Fred Roethlisberger	Individual	8.95	9.40	18.35	=32	8.85	8.70	17.55	=58	9.15	9.20	18.35	27	9.25	9.15	18.40	=30	9.10	9.50	18.60	=41	9.10	~~9.35~~	18.45	=47	109.70	=34
Dave Thor	Individual	9.15	9.30	18.45	=26	9.50	9.60	19.10	=4	9.00	9.00	18.00	=47	9.10	9.40	18.50	=23	8.70	9.30	18.00	=74	9.05	9.50	18.55	=42	110.60	24
Kanati Allen; Steve Cohen; Sid Freudenstein; Steve Hug; Fred Roethlisberger; Dave Thor	Team	45.35	46.55	—N/a		45.65	44.60	—N/a		45.15	46.05	—N/a		45.40	45.80	—N/a		44.80	47.10	—N/a		45.25	47.20	—N/a		548.90	7

Women
All-around

Athlete	Event	Apparatus																Total	
Athlete	Event	Vault				Uneven bars				Balance beam				Floor exercise				Total	
Athlete	Event	C	V	Total	Rank	C	V	Total	Rank	C	V	Total	Rank	C	V	Total	Rank	Score	Rank
Wendy Cluff	Individual	9.05	~~8.75~~	17.80	=58	~~8.75~~	9.00	17.75	46	9.20	~~9.00~~	18.20	=33	~~9.10~~	8.95	18.05	42	71.80	39
Kathy Gleason	Individual	9.20	9.30	18.50	=29	9.00	9.30	18.30	29	~~9.15~~	9.30	18.45	=27	9.20	9.05	18.25	=33	73.30	31
Linda Metheny	Individual	9.35	9.05	18.40	=31	9.40	~~8.75~~	18.15	=34	9.60	9.55	19.15	3 Q	9.30	9.00	18.30	32	74.00	28
Colleen Mulvihill	Individual	~~8.95~~	8.90	17.85	=53	9.20	9.30	18.50	=24	9.40	9.30	18.70	=18	9.15	~~8.85~~	18.00	=43	73.05	34
Cathy Rigby	Individual	9.20	9.10	18.30	=36	9.40	9.50	18.90	=12	9.55	9.45	19.00	=5	9.45	9.30	18.75	=20	74.95	16
Joyce Tanac	Individual	9.25	9.20	18.45	30	9.20	9.20	18.40	27	9.25	9.20	18.45	=27	9.25	9.10	18.35	31	73.65	30
Wendy Cluff; Kathy Gleason; Linda Metheny; Colleen Mulvihill; Cathy Rigby; Joyce Tanac	Team	46.05	45.55	—N/a		46.20	46.30	—N/a		47.00	46.80	—N/a		46.35	45.40	—N/a		369.75	6

Apparatus

Athlete	Event	Preliminary	Final	Score	Rank
Linda Metheny	Balance beam	9.575	9.650	19.225	=4

== Modern pentathlon ==
Three pentathletes represented the United States in 1968.

Athlete	Event	Riding (Cross-country steeplechase)				Fencing (Épée)			Shooting (Rapid-fire pistol)				Swimming (300 m freestyle)			Running (4000 m cross-country)			Total	
Athlete	Event	Time	Penalties	Rank	MP	V	Rank	MP (AIP)	Score	Penalties	Rank	MP	Time	Rank	MP	Time	Rank	MP	MP Points	Rank
Robert Beck	Individual	3:41	90	27	1010	28	=8	885 (896)	190	0	=13	912	4:06.5	28	925	16:10.3	42	655	4387	22
Tom Lough	Individual	3:32	120	31	980	18	=37	655 (662)	187	0	=25	846	3:56.4	12	988	15:15.2	24	820	4289	29
James Moore	Individual	3:36	60	=13	1040	24	=22	793 (766)	190	0	=13	912	4:05.5	=26	931	14:36.8	9	937	4613	11
Robert Beck; Tom Lough; James Moore	Team	—N/a			3030	—N/a		2324	—N/a			2670	—N/a		2844	—N/a		2412	13280	4

== Rowing ==
Athlete	Event	Heat		Repechage		Semifinal		Final	
Athlete	Event	Time	Rank	Time	Rank	Time	Rank	Time	Rank
John Van Blom	Single sculls	7:54.79	3 R	7:43.00	1 SF	7:49.85	3 FA	7:50.30	4
Larry Hough; Phillip Johnson	Coxless pair	7:19.92	1 SF	Bye		7:21.50	1 FA	7:26.71	2nd place, silver medalist(s)
Richard Edmumds; Bill Hobbs; Stewart MacDonald (C)	Coxed pair	8:12.48	1 SF	Bye		8:03.74	3 FA	8:12.60	5
Bill Maher; John Nunn	Double sculls	6:56.96	1 SF	Bye		7:10.05	1 FA	6:54.21	3rd place, bronze medalist(s)
Charles Hamlin; Pete Raymond; Lawrence Terry; Raymond Wright	Coxless four	6:57.68	2 R	6:39.78	1 FA	—N/a		6:47.70	5
Gardner Cadwalader; John Hartigan (C); Luther Jones; Tony Martin; Bill Purdy	Coxed four	7:21.39	3 SF	Bye		6:54.22	2 FA	6:51.41	5
Steve Brooks; Curtis Canning; Arthur Evans; David Higgins; Franklin Hobbs; Paul Hoffman (C); Andy Larkin; Cleve Livingston; Scott Steketee	Eight	6:15.42	5 R	6:19.81	2 FA	—N/a		6:14.34	6

Qualification Legend: FA=Final A (medal); FB=Final B (non-medal); SF=Semifinal; R=Repechage

== Sailing ==
Athlete	Event	1		2		3		4		5		6		7		Total	
Athlete	Event	Rank	Points	Rank	Points	Rank	Points	Rank	Points	Rank	Points	Rank	Points	Rank	Points	Points	Rank
Carl Van Duyne	Finn	DNF	42	~~DSQ~~	~~11~~	11	17	3	5.7	10	16	14	20	11	17	117.7	14
Bob James; David James	Flying Dutchman	~~DNF~~	~~36~~	9	15	14	20	18	24	15	21	3	5.7	6	11.7	97.4	10
Peter Barrett; Lowell North	Star	1	0	3	5.7	3	5.7	1	0	2	3	~~12~~	~~18~~	1	0	14.4	1st place, gold medalist(s)
George Friedrichs; Barton Jahncke; Gerald Schreck	Dragon	2	3	~~6~~	~~11.7~~	1	0	1	0	2	3	1	0	1	0	6	1st place, gold medalist(s)
Steve Colgate; Gardner Cox; Stuart H. Walker	5.5 Metre	7	13	8	14	8	14	4	8	~~9~~	~~15~~	8	14	6	11.7	74.7	8

== Shooting ==
Twelve shooters represented the United States in 1968. Gary Anderson won gold in the 300 m rifle, three positions, John Writer won silver in the 50 m rifle, three positions, and Thomas Garrigus won silver in the trap.

Athlete	Event	Final		Shoot-off 1		Shoot-off 2	
Athlete	Event	Score	Rank	Score	Rank	Score	Rank
Bill McMillan	25 m rapid fire pistol	584	17	—N/a			
Jim McNally	25 m rapid fire pistol	580	25	—N/a			
Don Hamilton	50 m pistol	549	16	—N/a			
Arnold Vitarbo	50 m pistol	559	4	—N/a			
Gary Anderson	50 m rifle prone	595	4	—N/a			
Lones Wigger	50 m rifle prone	592	25	—N/a			
John Foster	50 m rifle three positions	1153	4	—N/a			
John Writer	50 m rifle three positions	1156	2nd place, silver medalist(s)	—N/a			
Gary Anderson	300 m rifle three positions	1157 WR	1st place, gold medalist(s)	—N/a			
John Foster	300 m rifle three positions	1140	7	—N/a			
Thomas Garrigus	Trap	196	=2	25	=1	25	2nd place, silver medalist(s)
Ray Stafford	Trap	189	26	—N/a			
Earl Herring	Skeet	190	16	—N/a			
Robert Rodale	Skeet	189	19	—N/a			

== Swimming ==
Men

Athlete	Event	Heat		Semifinal		Final	
Athlete	Event	Time	Rank	Time	Rank	Time	Rank
Mark Spitz	100 m freestyle	54.6	4 Q	53.8	3 Q	53.0	3rd place, bronze medalist(s)
Ken Walsh	100 m freestyle	55.7	19 Q	53.9	7 Q	52.8	2nd place, silver medalist(s)
Zac Zorn	100 m freestyle	54.2	2 Q	53.4	2 Q	53.9	8
John Nelson	200 m freestyle	1:59.5 OR	2 Q	—N/a		1:58.1	3rd place, bronze medalist(s)
Don Schollander	200 m freestyle	2:00.0	3 Q	—N/a		1:58.1	2nd place, silver medalist(s)
Stephen Rerych	200 m freestyle	2:00.6	6 Q	—N/a		DNS	
Brent Berk	400 m freestyle	4:20.2	6 Q	—N/a		4:26.0	8
Mike Burton	400 m freestyle	4:19.3	4 Q	—N/a		4:09.0 OR	1st place, gold medalist(s)
John Nelson	400 m freestyle	4:18.7	2 Q	—N/a		4:17.2	6
Mike Burton	1500 m freestyle	17:27.2	5 Q	—N/a		16:38.9 OR	1st place, gold medalist(s)
John Kinsella	1500 m freestyle	17:22.7	4 Q	—N/a		16:57.3	2nd place, silver medalist(s)
John Nelson	1500 m freestyle	17:36.0	7 Q	—N/a		18:05.1	8
Larry Barbiere	100 m backstroke	1:01.9	5 Q	1:01.6	=2 Q	1:01.1	4
Charlie Hickcox	100 m backstroke	1:01.1	2 Q	1:01.6	=2 Q	1:00.2	2nd place, silver medalist(s)
Ronnie Mills	100 m backstroke	1:01.8	=3 Q	1:01.8	4 Q	1:00.5	3rd place, bronze medalist(s)
Gary Hall Sr.	200 m backstroke	2:16.2	2 Q	—N/a		2:12.6	4
Jack Horsley	200 m backstroke	2:13.7	3 Q	—N/a		2:10.9	3rd place, bronze medalist(s)
Mitch Ivey	200 m backstroke	2:11.3	1 Q	—N/a		2:10.6	2nd place, silver medalist(s)
Don McKenzie	100 m breaststroke	1:08.1	1 Q	1:08.1	=3 Q	1:07.7 OR	1st place, gold medalist(s)
Ken Merten	100 m breaststroke	1:10.6	=19 Q	1:11.6	22	Did not advance	
Dave Perkowski	100 m breaststroke	1:09.5	=7 Q	1:09.0	9	Did not advance	
Brian Job	200 m breaststroke	2:31.5	2 Q	—N/a		2:29.9	3rd place, bronze medalist(s)
Philip Long	200 m breaststroke	2:33.1	=5 Q	—N/a		2:33.6	7
Ken Merten	200 m breaststroke	2:37.0	12	—N/a		Did not advance	
Doug Russell	100 m butterfly	57.3 OR	1 Q	55.9 OR	1 Q	55.9	1st place, gold medalist(s)
Mark Spitz	100 m butterfly	58.5	3 Q	57.4	2 Q	56.4	2nd place, silver medalist(s)
Ross Wales	100 m butterfly	58.7	4 Q	58.2	4 Q	57.2	3rd place, bronze medalist(s)
John Ferris	200 m butterfly	2:10.6	=1 Q	—N/a		2:09.3	3rd place, bronze medalist(s)
Carl Robie	200 m butterfly	2:11.1	=4 Q	—N/a		2:08.7	1st place, gold medalist(s)
Mark Spitz	200 m butterfly	2:10.6	=1 Q	—N/a		2:13.5	8
Greg Buckingham	200 m individual medley	2:15.6	2 Q	—N/a		2:13.0	2nd place, silver medalist(s)
John Ferris	200 m individual medley	2:14.6 OR	1 Q	—N/a		2:13.3	3rd place, bronze medalist(s)
Charlie Hickcox	200 m individual medley	2:16.1 OR	3 Q	—N/a		2:12.0 OR	1st place, gold medalist(s)
Greg Buckingham	400 m individual medley	4:57.3	3 Q	—N/a		4:51.4	4
Gary Hall Sr.	400 m individual medley	4:56.2	=1 Q	—N/a		4:48.7	2nd place, silver medalist(s)
Charlie Hickcox	400 m individual medley	4:56.2	=1 Q	—N/a		4:48.4	1st place, gold medalist(s)
David Johnson^{[a]} William Johnson^{[a]} Stephen Rerych; Don Schollander^{[a]} Mark Spitz; Michael Wall^{[a]} Ken Walsh; Zac Zorn	4 × 100 m freestyle relay	3:35.4	1 Q	—N/a		3:31.7 WR	1st place, gold medalist(s)
David Johnson^{[a]} William Johnson^{[a]} John Nelson; Stephen Rerych; Don Schollander; Mark Spitz; Andrew Strenk^{[a]} Michael Wall^{[a]}	4 × 200 m freestyle relay	8:05.1	2 Q	—N/a		7:52.3	1st place, gold medalist(s)
Charlie Hickcox; Chet Jastremski^{[a]} Don McKenzie; Ronnie Mills^{[a]} Carl Robie^{[a]} Doug Russell; Don Schollander^{[a]} Ken Walsh	4 × 100 m medley relay	4:03.4	1 Q	—N/a		3:54.9 WR	1st place, gold medalist(s)

Women

Athlete	Event	Heat		Semifinal		Final	
Athlete	Event	Time	Rank	Time	Rank	Time	Rank
Linda Gustavson	100 m freestyle	1:00.8	4 Q	1:00.6	=3 Q	1:00.3	3rd place, bronze medalist(s)
Jan Henne	100 m freestyle	1:00.1	1 Q	1:00.5	2 Q	1:00.0	1st place, gold medalist(s)
Sue Pedersen	100 m freestyle	1:01.5	5 Q	1:00.2	1 Q	1:00.3	2nd place, silver medalist(s)
Jane Barkman	200 m freestyle	2:13.6	2 Q	—N/a		2:11.2	3rd place, bronze medalist(s)
Jan Henne	200 m freestyle	2:13.8	3 Q	—N/a		2:11.0	2nd place, silver medalist(s)
Debbie Meyer	200 m freestyle	2:13.1 OR	1 Q	—N/a		2:10.5 OR	1st place, gold medalist(s)
Linda Gustavson	400 m freestyle	4:41.4	3 Q	—N/a		4:45.5	2nd place, silver medalist(s)
Pam Kruse	400 m freestyle	4:45.2	5 Q	—N/a		4:37.2	4
Debbie Meyer	400 m freestyle	4:35.0 OR	1 Q	—N/a		4:31.8 OR	1st place, gold medalist(s)
Patty Caretto	800 m freestyle	9:46.4	=3 Q	—N/a		9:51.3	5
Pam Kruse	800 m freestyle	9:49.8	5 Q	—N/a		9:35.7	2nd place, silver medalist(s)
Debbie Meyer	800 m freestyle	9:42.8 OR	2 Q	—N/a		9:24.0 OR	1st place, gold medalist(s)
Kaye Hall	100 m backstroke	1:09.8	2 Q	1:08.2	2 Q	1:06.2 WR	1st place, gold medalist(s)
Kendis Moore	100 m backstroke	1:10.5	=10 Q	1:09.6	6 Q	1:08.3	4
Jane Swagerty	100 m backstroke	1:10.2	=6 Q	1:08.6	3 Q	1:08.1	3rd place, bronze medalist(s)
Susie Atwood	200 m backstroke	2:35.2	10	—N/a		Did not advance	
Kaye Hall	200 m backstroke	2:31.1 OR	3 Q	—N/a		2:28.9	3rd place, bronze medalist(s)
Lillian Watson	200 m backstroke	2:29.2 OR	1 Q	—N/a		2:24.8 OR	1st place, gold medalist(s)
Catie Ball	100 m breaststroke	1:18.8 OR	7 Q	1:16.8	=2 Q	1:16.7	5
Suzy Jones	100 m breaststroke	1:19.3	=10 Q	1:18.6	=11	Did not advance	
Sharon Wichman	100 m breaststroke	1:18.3	4 Q	1:16.8	=2 Q	1:16.1	3rd place, bronze medalist(s)
Cathy Jamison	200 m breaststroke	2:50.1	6 Q	—N/a		2:48.4	5
Sharon Wichman	200 m breaststroke	2:46.8	1 Q	—N/a		2:44.4 OR	1st place, gold medalist(s)
Ellie Daniel	100 m butterfly	1:07.2	3 Q	1:06.1	=1 Q	1:05.8	2nd place, silver medalist(s)
Toni Hewitt	100 m butterfly	1:08.1	8 Q	1:07.9	8 Q	1:07.5	7
Susan Shields	100 m butterfly	1:06.2	2 Q	1:06.3	4 Q	1:06.2	3rd place, bronze medalist(s)
Ellie Daniel	200 m butterfly	2:29.4	=3 Q	—N/a		2:25.9	3rd place, bronze medalist(s)
Diane Giebel	200 m butterfly	2:33.0	6 Q	—N/a		2:31.7	6
Toni Hewitt	200 m butterfly	2:29.1	2 Q	—N/a		2:26.2	4
Jan Henne	200 m individual medley	2:33.9	6 Q	—N/a		2:31.4	3rd place, bronze medalist(s)
Claudia Kolb	200 m individual medley	2:28.8 OR	1 Q	—N/a		2:24.7 OR	1st place, gold medalist(s)
Susan Pedersen	200 m individual medley	2:33.2	=4 Q	—N/a		2:28.8	2nd place, silver medalist(s)
Claudia Kolb	400 m individual medley	5:17.2 OR	1 Q	—N/a		5:08.5 OR	1st place, gold medalist(s)
Susan Pedersen	400 m individual medley	5:26.4	2 Q	—N/a		5:25.8	4
Lynn Vidali	400 m individual medley	5:28.9	3 Q	—N/a		5:22.2	2nd place, silver medalist(s)
Jane Barkman; Linda Gustavson; Jan Henne; Susan Pedersen	4 × 100 m freestyle relay	4:11.1	2 Q	—N/a		4:02.5 OR	1st place, gold medalist(s)
Catie Ball; Ellie Daniel; Kaye Hall; Jan Henne^{[a]} Suzy Jones^{[a]} Susan Pedersen; Susan Shields^{[a]} Jane Swagerty^{[a]}	4 × 100 m medley relay	4:34.7	2 Q	—N/a		4:28.3 OR	1st place, gold medalist(s)

^{a} Swimmers who participated in the heats only.

== Volleyball ==
Summary

Team	Event	Round robin									
Team	Event	Opposition Result	Opposition Result	Opposition Result	Opposition Result	Opposition Result	Opposition Result	Opposition Result	Opposition Result	Opposition Result	Rank
United States men	Men's tournament	Soviet Union; W 3–2	Czechoslovakia; L 1–3	Brazil; W 3–0	Bulgaria; L 2–3	Poland; L 0–3	East Germany; L 0–3	Japan; L 0–3	Mexico; W 3–1	Belgium; W 3–0	7
United States women	Women's tournament	Japan; L 0–3	Czechoslovakia; L 1–3	Poland; L 0–3	South Korea; L 1–3	Soviet Union; L 1–3	Peru; L 1–3	Mexico; L 0–3	—N/a		8

=== Men's tournament ===
- Round robin

- Defeated Soviet Union (3-2)
- Lost to Czechoslovakia (1-3)
- Defeated Brazil (3-0)
- Lost to Bulgaria (2-3)
- Lost to Poland (0-3)
- Lost to East Germany (0-3)
- Lost to Japan (0-3)
- Defeated Mexico (3-1)
- Defeated Belgium (3-0) → Seventh place

- Team roster

- John Alstrom
- Mike Bright
- Wink Davenport
- Smitty Duke
- Tom Haine
- Jack Henn
- Butch May
- Danny Patterson
- Larry Rundle
- Jon Stanley
- Rudy Suwara
- Pedro Velasco

- Head coach: Jim Coleman

=== Women's tournament ===
- Round robin

- Lost to Japan (0-3)
- Lost to Czechoslovakia (1-3)
- Lost to Poland (0-3)
- Lost to South Korea (1-3)
- Lost to Soviet Union (1-3)
- Lost to Peru (1-3)
- Lost to Mexico (0-3) → 8th and last place

- Team roster

- Patti Lucas Bright
- Kathryn Ann Heck
- Fanny Hopeau
- Ninja Jorgensen
- Laurie Lewis
- Miki McFadden
- Marilyn McReavy
- Nancy Owen
- Barbara "Bobbie" Perry
- Mary Perry
- Sharon Peterson
- Jane Ward (captain)

- Head coach: Harlan Cohen

== Water polo ==
Summary

Team	Event	Preliminary round							Semifinal / Pl.	Final / BM / Cl.	
Team	Event	Opposition Result	Opposition Result	Opposition Result	Opposition Result	Opposition Result	Opposition Result	Rank	Opposition Result	Opposition Result	Rank
United States men	Water polo	Brazil; W 10–5	Spain; W 10–7	Cuba; T 6–6	Hungary; L 1–5	Soviet Union; L 3–8	West Germany; W 7–5	3	5th-8th semifinal Netherlands; W 6–3	5th place match East Germany; W 6–4	5

Team Competition

- Preliminary round (group A)

- Defeated Brazil (10:5)
- Defeated Spain (10:7)
- Tied with Cuba (6:6)
- Lost to Hungary (1:5)
- Lost to Soviet Union (3:8)
- Defeated West Germany (7:5)

- Classification Matches

- 5th/8th place: Defeated Netherlands (6:3)
- 5th/6th place: Defeated East Germany (6:4) → 5th place

- Team roster

- Anton Van Dorp
- Barry Weitzenberg
- Bruce Bradley
- David Ashleigh
- Dean Willeford
- Gary Sheerer
- John Parker
- Ronald Crawford
- Russell Webb
- Stanley Cole
- Steven Barnett

== Weightlifting ==
Athlete	Event	Weight	Rank
Russell Knipp	75 kg	437.5	4
Fred Lowe	75 kg	430.0	8
Joe Puleo	82.5 kg	DNF	
Bart Bartholomew	90 kg	457.5	9
Phil Grippaldi	90 kg	477.5	7
Joseph Dube	+90 kg	555.0	3rd place, bronze medalist(s)
Ernie Pickett	+90 kg	DNF	

== Wrestling ==
Key:

- TF – Victory by fall.
- SP - Win by technical superiority
- PP - Win by technical points

Athlete	Event	Elimination stage							Final stage			
Athlete	Event	Opposition Result (Penalty points)	Opposition Result (Penalty points)	Opposition Result (Penalty points)	Opposition Result (Penalty points)	Opposition Result (Penalty points)	Opposition Result (Penalty points)	TPP	Opposition Result (Penalty points)	Opposition Result (Penalty points)	FPP	Rank
Richard Sanders	Freestyle 52 kg	Defran (DOM); W TF (0.0)	Dimovski (YUG); W TF (0.0)	Ghorbani (IRN); W TF (0.0)	Kumar (IND); W TF (0.0)	—N/a		0.0	Nakata (JPN); L PP (3.0)	Damdinsharav (MGL); W PP (1.0)	4.0	2nd place, silver medalist(s)
Donald Behm	Freestyle 57 kg	Sardar (PAK); W PP (1.0)	Raxon (GUA); W TF (0.0)	Singh (IND); W SP (0.5)	Talebi (IRN); L PP (3.0)	Shavov (BUL); W PP (1.0)	—N/a	5.5	Aliyev (URS); W PP (1.0)	—N/a	6.5	2nd place, silver medalist(s)
Bobby Douglas	Freestyle 63 kg	Seyed-Abbasi (IRN); L PP (3.0)	WDR									
Wayne Wells	Freestyle 70 kg	Beriashivili (URS); T (2.0)	Karlsson (SWE); W PP (1.0)	Ioannidis (GRE); W TF (0.0)	Pająk (POL); W PP (1.0)	Horiuchi (JPN); W PP (1.0)	Valchev (BUL); L PP (3.0)	8.0	Did not advance			4
Steve Combs	Freestyle 78 kg	Atalay (TUR); L PP (3.0)	Martinetti (SUI); W PP (1.0)	Seo (KOR); W PP (1.0)	Robin (FRA); L PP (3.0)	—N/a		8.0	Did not advance			=6
Tom Peckham	Freestyle 87 kg	Gardzhev (BUL); T (2.0)	Graffigna (GUA); W PP (1.0)	Marcheggiani (ITA); W TF (0.0)	Endo (JPN); W TF (0.0)	Gürsoy (TUR); T (2.0)	—N/a	5.0	Mönkhbat (MGL); L PP (3.0)	—N/a	8.0	4
Jess Lewis	Freestyle 97 kg	Bachmann (GDR); W PP (1.0)	Kawano (JPN); W PP (1.0)	Ayik (TUR); T (2.0)	Mustafov (BUL); L PP (3.0)	EL		7.0	Did not advance			6
Larry Kristoff	Freestyle +97 kg	Robertsson (SWE); W DQ (0.0)	Nyers (HUN); W PP (1.0)	Anvari (IRN); W PP (1.0)	Medved (URS); L DQ (4.0)	EL		6.0	Did not advance			5
Richard Tamble	Greco-Roman 52 kg	Bakulin (URS); L PP (3.0)	Çıkmaz (TUR); L PP (3.0)	EL				6.0	Did not advance			=17
David Hazewinkel	Greco-Roman 57 kg	Baciu (ROU); L PP (3.0)	Nielsen (DEN); W TF (0.0)	Traikov (BUL); W DQ (0.0)	El-Sayed (RAU); L PP (3.0)	EL		6.0	Did not advance			=8
Jim Hazewinkel	Greco-Roman 63 kg	Rusznyák (HUN); W PP (1.0)	Rurua (URS); L TF (4.0)	Kim (KOR); W SP (0.5)	Galinchev (BUL); L PP (3.0)	EL		8.5	Did not advance			7
Werner Holzer	Greco-Roman 70 kg	Ben Mansour (MAR); W TF (0.0)	Karlsson (SWE); L TF (4.0)	Madsen (DEN); W PP (1.0)	Rost (FRG); L PP (3.0)	EL		8.0	Did not advance			=6
Larry Lyden	Greco-Roman 78 kg	Nenadić (YUG); L SP (3.5)	Savvas (GRE); L PP (3.0)	EL				6.5	Did not advance			=16
Wayne Baughman	Greco-Roman 87 kg	Metz (GDR); L PP (3.0)	Alvarez (MEX); W TF (0.0)	Ojala (FIN); W TF (0.0)	Kwieciński (POL); W PP (1.0)	Olenik (URS); L TF (4.0)	—N/a	8.0	Did not advance			5
Henk Schenk	Greco-Roman 97 kg	Radev (BUL); L DQ (4.0)	Jutzeler (SUI); T (2.5)	EL				6.5	Did not advance			12
Bob Roop	Greco-Roman +97 kg	Geris (CAN); W TF (0.0)	Petrov (BUL); L TF (4.0)	Roshchin (URS); L TF (4.0)	EL			8.0	Did not advance			10
