= 1968 United States men's Olympic basketball team =

- Head coach: Hank Iba
- Scoring leader: (United States) Spencer Haywood 16.3

The 1968 United States men's Olympic basketball team represented the United States at the 1968 Summer Olympics in Mexico City, Mexico from October 13 to 25, 1968. Team USA won its seventh consecutive gold medal.

== 1968 USA men's Olympic games roster ==
| Name | Position | Height | Weight | Age | Team/School | Home Town |
|---|---|---|---|---|---|---|
| Mike Barrett | G | 6'2" | 155 | 25 | U.S. Armed Forces (West Virginia Tech) | Richwood, West Virginia |
| John Clawson | G | 6'4" | 200 | 24 | U.S. Armed Forces (Michigan) | Naperville, Illinois |
| Don Dee | F | 6'7" | 205 | 25 | St. Mary of the Plains Col. (KS) | Kansas City, Missouri |
| Calvin Fowler | G | 6'1" | 170 | 27 | Goodyear Wingfoots (St. Francis) | Akron, Ohio |
| Spencer Haywood | C | 6'8" | 225 | 19 | Trinidad State Junior College | Detroit, Michigan |
| Bill Hosket | F | 6'8" | 220 | 21 | Ohio State University | Dayton, Ohio |
| Jim King | F | 6'7" | 200 | 25 | Goodyear Wingfoots (Okla. St.) | Akron, Ohio |
| Glynn Saulters | G | 6'2" | 175 | 23 | Northeast Louisiana University | Lisbon, Louisiana |
| Charlie Scott | F | 6'5" | 180 | 19 | University of North Carolina | New York, New York |
| Mike Silliman | F | 6'6" | 225 | 23 | U.S. Armed Forces (Military Acd.) | Louisville, Kentucky |
| Ken Spain | C | 6'9" | 240 | 22 | University of Houston | Houston, Texas |
| Jo Jo White | G | 6'3" | 195 | 21 | University of Kansas | St. Louis, Missouri |

The roster was led by future NBA All-Stars Haywood (19 years old) and White (21 years old), who led the team in scoring, with an average of 16.3 points and 11.7 points respectively. Haywood was the youngest player to make the USA basketball team at the time.

USA Basketball also selected 6 alternates to the U.S. squad; Tom Black of the Goodyear Wingfoots, George Carter of the US Army, Joe Hamilton of Christian College of the Southwest (TX) Junior College, Dan Issel of the University of Kentucky, Rick Mount of Purdue University and Charlie Paulk of Northeastern Oklahoma College.

Notably absent from the squad or the list of alternates were Pete Maravich, who led the NCAA in scoring during his sophomore season at LSU and would go on to set the NCAA career scoring record of 3,667 points, and reigning NCAA Champion and Player of the Year Lew Alcindor, who chose not to try out for the Olympic team in protest at the treatment of African Americans in the United States, stating that he was "trying to point out to the world the futility of winning the gold medal for this country and then coming back to live under oppression." Some of other NCAA stars, such as Elvin Hayes, Wes Unseld, Bob Lanier and Calvin Murphy, were also absent. As such, the Americans were severely weakened.

== Staff ==
- Head coach: Hank Iba, Oklahoma State University
- Assistant coach: Henry Vaughn, Goodyear Wingfoots
- Assistant coach: John McLendon, Cleveland State University
- Team Manager: Ben Carnevale, New York University
- Assistant Manager: G. Russel Lyons, Boulder, CO
- Athletic Trainer: Whitey Gwynne, West Virginia University

== Results ==
- United States beat Spain, 81–46
- United States beat Senegal, 93–36
- United States beat Philippines, 96–75
- United States beat Yugoslavia, 73–58
- United States beat Panama, 95–60
- United States beat Italy, 100–61
- United States beat Puerto Rico, 61–56
- United States beat Brazil, 75–63
- United States beat Yugoslavia, 65–50

By obtaining an 8–0 record, Team USA would earn its right to play in the gold medal game. The team who won the game would receive the gold medal, and the team who lost the game would receive the silver medal.

== Final standings ==
- 1. United States (9–0)
- 2. Yugoslavia (7–2) (silver medalists)
- 3. Soviet Union (8–1) (bronze medalists)
- 4. Brazil (6–3)
- 5. Mexico (7–2)
- 6. Poland (5–4)
- 7. Spain (5–4)
- 8. Italy (5–4)
- 9. Puerto Rico (5–4)
- 10. Bulgaria (4–5)
- 11. Cuba (3–6)
- 12. Panama (2–7)
- 13. Philippines (3–6)
- 14. South Korea (2–7)
- 15. Senegal (1–8)
- 16. Morocco (0–9)

== See also ==
- Basketball at the 1968 Summer Olympics
