= List of 1970–71 NBA season transactions =

These are the list of personnel changes in the NBA from the 1970–71 NBA season.

== Events ==
=== July 8, 1970 ===
- The Phoenix Suns traded Heywood Dotson to the New York Knicks for a 1971 5th round draft pick (Bob Kissane was later selected).

=== July 27, 1970 ===
- The Phoenix Suns waived Neil Johnson.

=== August 28, 1970 ===
- The Los Angeles Lakers claimed Fred Hetzel on waivers from the Portland Trail Blazers.

=== September 10, 1970 ===
- The San Diego Rockets traded Art Williams to the Boston Celtics for a 1971 5th round draft pick (Greg Nelson was later selected).

=== September 15, 1970 ===
- The Chicago Bulls signed A.W. Holt as a free agent.

=== September 17, 1970 ===
- The Milwaukee Bucks traded Zaid Abdul-Aziz and cash to the Seattle SuperSonics for Lucius Allen and Bob Boozer.

=== September 23, 1970 ===
- The San Francisco Warriors signed Nick Jones as a free agent.

=== September 28, 1970 ===
- The Seattle SuperSonics signed Tom Black as a free agent.

=== September 29, 1970 ===
- The Cleveland Cavaliers signed Gary Suiter as a free agent.

=== October 2, 1970 ===
- The Boston Celtics sold Jim Barnes to the Baltimore Bullets.

=== October 5, 1970 ===
- The Cincinnati Royals signed Moe Barr as a free agent.
- The Milwaukee Bucks signed Bobby Washington as a free agent.
- The Milwaukee Bucks signed Jeff Webb as a free agent.

=== October 7, 1970 ===
- The Portland Trail Blazers sold Pat Riley to the Los Angeles Lakers.

=== October 13, 1970 ===
- The Chicago Bulls signed Jim King as a free agent.

=== October 14, 1970 ===
- The Cincinnati Royals signed Bob Arnzen as a free agent.

=== October 15, 1970 ===
- The Cleveland Cavaliers signed Cliff Anderson as a free agent.

=== October 16, 1970 ===
- The Philadelphia 76ers traded Darrall Imhoff and a future draft pick to the Cincinnati Royals for Connie Dierking and Fred Foster.
- The Philadelphia 76ers traded Matt Guokas to the Chicago Bulls for a 1971 2nd round draft pick (Marvin Stewart was later selected).

=== October 20, 1970 ===
- The Chicago Bulls traded Shaler Halimon to the Portland Trail Blazers for a 1971 2nd round draft pick (Willie Sojourner was later selected).

=== October 22, 1970 ===
- The Portland Trail Blazers traded Dorie Murrey to the Baltimore Bullets for a 1971 2nd round draft pick (Rick Fisher was later selected).

=== October 26, 1970 ===
- The Portland Trail Blazers signed Bill Stricker as a free agent.

=== October 28, 1970 ===
- The Atlanta Hawks claimed Len Chappell on waivers from the Cleveland Cavaliers.

=== November 11, 1970 ===
- The Los Angeles Lakers traded John Tresvant to the Baltimore Bullets for a 1972 2nd round draft pick (Paul Stovall was later selected).

=== November 12, 1970 ===
- The Cleveland Cavaliers signed Larry Mikan as a free agent.

=== November 16, 1970 ===
- The Portland Trail Blazers waived Bill Stricker.

=== November 26, 1970 ===
- The Buffalo Braves traded Freddie Crawford to the Philadelphia 76ers for a future draft pick.

=== December 9, 1970 ===
- The Cleveland Cavaliers traded Johnny Egan to the San Diego Rockets for a 1971 3rd round draft pick (Jackie Ridgle was later selected).

=== December 12, 1970 ===
- The Cleveland Cavaliers claimed Bobby Washington on waivers from the Milwaukee Bucks.

=== December 17, 1970 ===
- The Philadelphia 76ers signed Cliff Anderson as a free agent.

=== December 30, 1970 ===
- The Seattle SuperSonics signed Spencer Haywood as a free agent. The NBA sued Seattle because Haywood violated rules stating a player could not join the league until he was four years out of high school; the Supreme Court ruled in favor of Seattle on March 8, 1971.

=== January 17, 1971 ===
- The San Francisco Warriors signed Bill Turner as a free agent.

=== January 20, 1971 ===
- The Pittsburgh Condors traded Howard Porter to the Chicago Bulls for Paul Ruffner and cash.

=== January 26, 1971 ===
- The Chicago Bulls waived A.W. Holt.

=== January 29, 1971 ===
- The Cincinnati Royals claimed Willie Williams on waivers from the Boston Celtics.

=== February 1, 1971 ===
- The Milwaukee Bucks traded Gary Freeman and a 1971 2nd round draft pick (Willie Long was later selected) to the Cleveland Cavaliers for McCoy McLemore.

=== February 10, 1971 ===
- The Cincinnati Royals claimed Tom Black on waivers from the Seattle SuperSonics.

=== March 23, 1971 ===
- The Portland Trail Blazers traded Jim Barnett to the San Francisco Warriors for a 1971 2nd round draft pick (Charlie Yelverton was later selected), a 1971 3rd round draft pick (William Smith was later selected) and a 1972 2nd round draft pick (Dave Twardzik was later selected).

=== March 29, 1971 ===
- The Cincinnati Royals traded Flynn Robinson to the Los Angeles Lakers for a 1971 2nd round draft pick (Joe Bergman was later selected).

=== April 2, 1971 ===
The Detroit Pistons traded Otto Moore to the Phoenix Suns for a 1972 1st round draft pick (Bob Nash was later selected).

=== April 6, 1971 ===
The Portland Trail Blazers waived Claude English.

=== April 8, 1971 ===
- Alex Hannum resigns as head coach for the San Diego Rockets.

=== April 15, 1971 ===
- The Chicago Bulls waived George Johnson.

=== May 7, 1971 ===
- The New York Knicks traded Cazzie Russell to the San Francisco Warriors for Jerry Lucas.

=== May 14, 1971 ===
- The Houston Rockets hired Tex Winter as head coach.
- The Cincinnati Royals traded Charlie Paulk to the Chicago Bulls for Matt Guokas and a future draft pick.

=== June 3, 1971 ===
- The Los Angeles Lakers fired Joe Mullaney as head coach.

=== June 9, 1971 ===
- The Chicago Bulls traded Dick Gibbs to the San Diego Rockets for a 1973 2nd round draft pick (Kevin Stacom was later selected).
