= Basketball at the 1968 Summer Olympics =

7th Olympic Basketball Tournament
- Mexico City 1968

Tournament details
- Olympics: 1968 Summer Olympics
- Host nation: Mexico
- City: Mexico City
- Duration: October 13–25, 1968

Men's tournament
- Teams: 16
Medals
Gold medalists	United States
Silver medalists	Yugoslavia
Bronze medalists	Soviet Union

Tournaments
← Tokyo 1964	Munich 1972 →

Basketball contests at the 1968 Summer Olympics was the seventh appearance of the sport of basketball as an official Olympic medal event. It took place at the Palacio de los Deportes in Mexico City, Mexico from October 13 to October 25, 1968. The United States defeated Yugoslavia to win their seventh consecutive gold medal in this sport, while the Soviet Union earned the bronze against Brazil.

The Americans' record of seven basketball gold medals in a row was matched by their women's team in 2021 when they won the 2020 Olympics, and then broken in 2024.

== Medal summary ==
Gold:	Silver:	Bronze:
United States; Mike Barrett; John Clawson; Don Dee; Calvin Fowler; Spencer Haywood; Bill Hosket; Jim King; Glynn Saulters; Mike Silliman; Ken Spain; Jo Jo White; Charlie Scott	Yugoslavia; Dragutin Čermak; Krešimir Ćosić; Vladimir Cvetković; Ivo Daneu; Radivoj Korać; Zoran Marojević; Nikola Plećaš; Trajko Rajković; Dragoslav Ražnatović; Petar Skansi; Damir Šolman; Aljoša Žorga	Soviet Union; Anatoli Krikun; Modestas Paulauskas; Zurab Sakandelidze; Vadim Kapranov; Yuri Selikhov; Anatoli Polivoda; Sergei Belov; Priit Tomson; Sergei Kovalenko; Gennadi Volnov; Jaak Lipso; Vladimir Andreev

== Qualification ==
Automatic qualifications were granted to the host country and the first five places at the previous tournament. Additional spots were decided by various continental tournaments held by FIBA plus two additional tournaments that granted two extra berths each.

Means of qualification	Date	Venue	Berths	Qualified
Host nation			1	Mexico
1964 Olympic Tournament	11–23 October 1964	(Japan) Tokyo	5	United States
1964 Olympic Tournament	11–23 October 1964	(Japan) Tokyo	5	Soviet Union
1964 Olympic Tournament	11–23 October 1964	(Japan) Tokyo	5	Brazil
1964 Olympic Tournament	11–23 October 1964	(Japan) Tokyo	5	Puerto Rico
1964 Olympic Tournament	11–23 October 1964	(Japan) Tokyo	5	Italy
1967 Pan American Games	24 July–2 August 1967	(Canada) Winnipeg	2	Cuba
1967 Pan American Games	24 July–2 August 1967	(Canada) Winnipeg	2	Panama
1967 ABC Championship	23 September – 1 October 1967	(South Korea) Seoul	2	Philippines
1967 ABC Championship	23 September – 1 October 1967	(South Korea) Seoul	2	South Korea
FIBA Africa Championship 1968	29 March–2 April 1968	(Morocco) Casablanca	2	Senegal
FIBA Africa Championship 1968	29 March–2 April 1968	(Morocco) Casablanca	2	Morocco
European Pre-Olympic Tournament	25 May–3 June 1968	(Switzerland) Geneva	2	SFR Yugoslavia
European Pre-Olympic Tournament	25 May–3 June 1968	(Switzerland) Geneva	2	Bulgaria
Pan-Continental Pre-Olympic Tournament	26 September–2 October 1968	(Mexico) Monterrey	2	Poland
Pan-Continental Pre-Olympic Tournament	26 September–2 October 1968	(Mexico) Monterrey	2	Spain
Total			16	

== Format ==
- Two groups of eight teams are formed, where the top two from each group compete for the medals in a knockout round.
- The remaining places are defined as follows:
  - Fifth through eighth places are decided in a separate bracket between the third and fourth places from each group in a separate bracket.
  - Ninth through sixteenth places are decided between the fifth through eighth places from each group in separate brackets.

== Squads ==
For the team rosters see: Basketball at the 1968 Summer Olympics – Men's team rosters.

== Preliminary round ==
The top two teams from each group advance to the semifinals, while the remaining teams compete for 5th through 16th places in separate brackets. Both group leaders, the United States and the Soviet Union advanced undefeated to the knockout stage.

=== Group A ===
Pos	Team	Pld	W	L	PF	PA	PD	Pts	Qualification
1	United States	7	7	0	599	392	+207	14	Semifinals
2	Yugoslavia	7	6	1	592	511	+81	13	Semifinals
3	Italy	7	5	2	562	539	+23	12	5th–8th classification round
4	Spain	7	4	3	557	548	+9	11	5th–8th classification round
5	Puerto Rico	7	3	4	493	468	+25	10	9th–12th classification round
6	Panama	7	2	5	572	624	−52	9	9th–12th classification round
7	Philippines	7	1	6	525	636	−111	8	13th–16th classification round
8	Senegal	7	0	7	383	565	−182	7	13th–16th classification round

Source: FIBA archive
Rules for classification: 1) points; 2) head-to-head points; 3) head-to-head goal average; 4) head-to-head number of points scored.

October 13

United States	81–46	Spain

Palacio de los Deportes, Mexico City

Italy	91–66	Philippines

Palacio de los Deportes, Mexico City

Puerto Rico	69–26	Senegal

Palacio de los Deportes, Mexico City

SFR Yugoslavia	96–85	Panama

Palacio de los Deportes, Mexico City

October 14

United States	93–36	Senegal

Palacio de los Deportes, Mexico City

Spain	108–79	Philippines

Palacio de los Deportes, Mexico City

Puerto Rico	72–93	SFR Yugoslavia

Palacio de los Deportes, Mexico City

Italy	94–87	Panama

Palacio de los Deportes, Mexico City

October 15

Senegal	65–84	SFR Yugoslavia

Palacio de los Deportes, Mexico City

Spain	88–82	Panama

Palacio de los Deportes, Mexico City

United States	96–75	Philippines

Palacio de los Deportes, Mexico City

Puerto Rico	65–68	Italy

Palacio de los Deportes, Mexico City

October 16

Philippines	92–95	Panama

Palacio de los Deportes, Mexico City

Spain	86–62	Puerto Rico

Palacio de los Deportes, Mexico City

Senegal	55–81	Italy

Palacio de los Deportes, Mexico City

United States	73–58	SFR Yugoslavia

Palacio de los Deportes, Mexico City

October 18

United States	95–60	Panama

Palacio de los Deportes, Mexico City

Senegal	54–64	Spain

Palacio de los Deportes, Mexico City

Philippines	65–89	Puerto Rico

Palacio de los Deportes, Mexico City

Italy	69–80	SFR Yugoslavia

Palacio de los Deportes, Mexico City

October 19

Panama	69–80	Puerto Rico

Palacio de los Deportes, Mexico City

Philippines	80–68	Senegal

Palacio de los Deportes, Mexico City

SFR Yugoslavia	92–79	Spain

Palacio de los Deportes, Mexico City

United States	100–61	Italy

Palacio de los Deportes, Mexico City

October 20

Panama	94–79	Senegal

Palacio de los Deportes, Mexico City

Italy	98–86	Spain

Palacio de los Deportes, Mexico City

SFR Yugoslavia	89–68	Philippines

Palacio de los Deportes, Mexico City

United States	61–56	Puerto Rico

Palacio de los Deportes, Mexico City

=== Group B ===
Pos	Team	Pld	W	L	PF	PA	PD	Pts	Qualification
1	Soviet Union	7	7	0	642	408	+234	14	Semifinals
2	Brazil	7	6	1	561	418	+143	13	Semifinals
3	Mexico (H)	7	5	2	493	443	+50	12	5th–8th classification round
4	Poland	7	4	3	473	504	−31	11	5th–8th classification round
5	Bulgaria	7	3	4	456	478	−22	10	9th–12th classification round
6	Cuba	7	2	5	514	532	−18	9	9th–12th classification round
7	South Korea	7	1	6	453	530	−77	8	13th–16th classification round
8	Morocco	7	0	7	355	634	−279	7	13th–16th classification round

Source: FIBA archive
Rules for classification: 1) points; 2) head-to-head points; 3) head-to-head goal average; 4) head-to-head number of points scored.
(H) Hosts

October 13

Brazil	98–52	Morocco

Palacio de los Deportes, Mexico City

Soviet Union	91–50	Poland

Palacio de los Deportes, Mexico City

Mexico	75–62	South Korea

Palacio de los Deportes, Mexico City

Cuba	61–70	Bulgaria

Palacio de los Deportes, Mexico City

October 14

Soviet Union	123–51	Morocco

Palacio de los Deportes, Mexico City

Poland	77–67	South Korea

Palacio de los Deportes, Mexico City

Brazil	75–59	Bulgaria

Palacio de los Deportes, Mexico City

Mexico	76–75	Cuba

Palacio de los Deportes, Mexico City

October 15

Morocco	59–77	Bulgaria

Palacio de los Deportes, Mexico City

Poland	78–75	Cuba

Palacio de los Deportes, Mexico City

Soviet Union	89–58	South Korea

Palacio de los Deportes, Mexico City

Mexico	53–60	Brazil

Palacio de los Deportes, Mexico City

October 16

Soviet Union	81–56	Bulgaria

Palacio de los Deportes, Mexico City

Morocco	38–86	Mexico

Palacio de los Deportes, Mexico City

Poland	51–88	Brazil

Palacio de los Deportes, Mexico City

South Korea	71–80	Cuba

Palacio de los Deportes, Mexico City

October 18

Morocco	48–85	Poland

Palacio de los Deportes, Mexico City

Soviet Union	100–66	Cuba

Palacio de los Deportes, Mexico City

South Korea	59–91	Brazil

Palacio de los Deportes, Mexico City

Mexico	73–63	Bulgaria

Palacio de los Deportes, Mexico City

October 19

Morocco	54–76	South Korea

Palacio de los Deportes, Mexico City

Cuba	68–84	Brazil

Palacio de los Deportes, Mexico City

Bulgaria	67–69	Poland

Palacio de los Deportes, Mexico City

Soviet Union	82–62	Mexico

Palacio de los Deportes, Mexico City

October 20

Morocco	53–89	Cuba

Palacio de los Deportes, Mexico City

Bulgaria	64–60	South Korea

Palacio de los Deportes, Mexico City

Mexico	68–63	Poland

Palacio de los Deportes, Mexico City

Soviet Union	76–65	Brazil

Palacio de los Deportes, Mexico City

== Knockout stage ==
The much anticipated final between the United States and the Soviet Union would have to wait four years. Yugoslavia stunned the Soviets 63–62 in the semifinals. In the championship game the Americans had a slim 32-29 lead at intermission but put the game out of reach with a 22-3 streak to start the second half.

=== Medal bracket ===
Semifinals (October 22)
A1	United States	75
B2	Brazil	63
B1	Soviet Union	62
A2	SFR Yugoslavia	63

Gold medal (October 25)
A1	United States	65
A2	SFR Yugoslavia	50
Bronze medal (October 25)
B2	Brazil	53
B1	Soviet Union	70

=== Classification brackets ===
5th–8th Place

Semifinals (October 22)
A3	Italy	52
B4	Poland	66
B3	Mexico	73
A4	Spain	72

5th place (October 25)
B3	Poland	65
B4	Mexico	75
7th place (October 25)
A3	Italy	72
A4	Spain	88

9th–12th Place

Semifinals (October 23)
A5	Puerto Rico	71
B6	Cuba	65
B5	Bulgaria	83
A6	Panama	79

9th place (October 24)
A5	Puerto Rico	67
B5	Bulgaria	57
11th place (October 24)
A6	Cuba	91
B6	Panama	88

13th–16th Place

Semifinals (October 23)
A7	Philippines	86
B8	Morocco	57
B7	South Korea	76
A8	Senegal	59

13th place (October 24)
A7	Philippines	66
B7	South Korea	63
15th place (October 24)
B8	Morocco	38
A8	Senegal	42

== Awards ==
1968 Olympic Basketball Champions

United States
Seventh title

== Final standings ==
Rank	Team	Pld	W	L
1st place, gold medalist(s)	United States	9	9	0
2nd place, silver medalist(s)	SFR Yugoslavia	9	7	2
3rd place, bronze medalist(s)	Soviet Union	9	8	1
4th	Brazil	9	6	3
5th	Mexico	9	7	2
6th	Poland	9	5	4
7th	Spain	9	5	4
8th	Italy	9	5	4
9th	Puerto Rico	9	5	4
10th	Bulgaria	9	4	5
11th	Cuba	9	3	6
12th	Panama	9	2	7
13th	Philippines	9	3	6
14th	South Korea	9	2	7
15th	Senegal	9	1	8
16th	Morocco	9	0	9
