= Boxing at the 1968 Summer Olympics – Middleweight =

Boxing competitions

The Middleweight class in the boxing competition was the third-highest weight class. Middleweights were limited to those boxers weighing a maximum of 75 kilograms (165.3 lbs). 22 boxers qualified for this category. Like all Olympic boxing events, the competition was a straight single-elimination tournament. Both semifinal losers were awarded bronze medals, so no boxers competed again after their first loss. Bouts consisted of six rounds each. Five judges scored each bout.

== Medalists ==
Gold	Chris Finnegan; Great Britain
Silver	Aleksei Kiselyov; Soviet Union
Bronze	Agustín Zaragoza; Mexico
Bronze	Alfred Jones; United States

Finnegan was unable to produce a urine sample immediately after the bout for the compulsory drugs test. He drank copious amounts of beer and water, to no effect. Finnegan then attended a local restaurant for a victory meal, where, at 1:40 am, he was able to produce a sample, which proved negative.

== Schedule ==
Date	Round
Tuesday, October 15, 1968	First round
Thursday, October 17, 1968	Second round
Tuesday, October 22, 1968	Quarterfinals
Thursday, October 24, 1968	Semifinals
Saturday, October 26, 1968	Final Bout

== Preliminaries ==
Since boxer George Aidoo from Ghana could not compete, a new draw was made after the preliminary bouts. Simeon Georgiev from Bulgaria drew a bye.

- Raúl Marrero (CUB) def. Saulo Hernández (PUR), DSQ-2
- Chris Finnegan (GBR) def. Titus Simba (TAN), 5:0
- Simeon Georgiev (BUL) def. Mario Casati (ITA), 4:1
- Alfred Jones (USA) def. Marcelo Quiñones (PER), 5:0
- Mate Parlov (YUG) def. Lahcen Ahidous (MAR), 5:0
- Aleksei Kiselyov (URS) def. Antoine Abang (CMR), 5:0
- Jan van Ispelen (NED) def. Misael Vilugron (CHI), TKO-2

== Draw ==
Second round
Agustín Zaragoza (MEX)	5
Oliver Wright (JAM)	0
Jan Hejduk (TCH)	RSC
Nolberto Freitas (URU)
Aleksei Kiselyov (URS)	4
Matthias Ouma (UGA)	1
Wiesław Rudkowski (POL)	RSC
Charles Amos (GUY)
Christopher Finnegan (GBR)	3
Ewald Wichert (FRG)	2
Parlov Mate (YUG)	4
Jan van Ispelen (NED)	1
Alfred Jones (USA)	5
Raúl Marrero (CUB)	0
Simon Georgiev (BUL)	Bye

Quarterfinals
Agustín Zaragoza (MEX)	4
Jan Hejduk (TCH)	1
Aleksei Kiselyov (URS)	5
Wiesław Rudkowski (POL)	0
Christopher Finnegan (GBR)	5
Parlov Mate (YUG)	0
Alfred Jones (USA)	4
Simon Georgiev (BUL)	1

Semifinals
Agustín Zaragoza (MEX)
Aleksei Kiselyov (URS)	RSC
Christopher Finnegan (GBR)	4
Alfred Jones (USA)	1

Final
Aleksei Kiselyov (URS)	2
Christopher Finnegan (GBR)	3
