= Wichert =

Wichert may refer to:

== People ==
- Christian Wichert (born 1987), German ice hockey player
- Ernst Wichert (1831–1902), German lawyer, judge, and author
- Ewald Wichert (born 1940), German boxer
- Fritz Wichert (1878-1951), German art historian
- Lars Wichert (born 1986), German rower
- Sabine Wichert (1942-2014), German poet in Northern Ireland

== Places ==
- Wichert, Illinois, United States

== See also ==
- Wychert
