= Chris Finnegan =

English boxer (1944–2009)

Chris Finnegan MBE
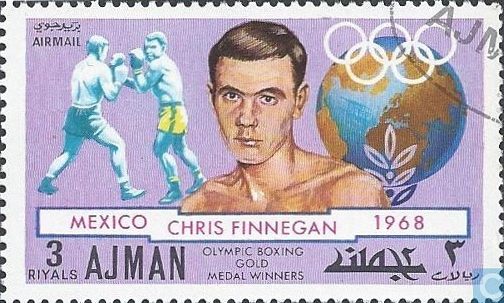

Personal information
- Nationality: British
- Born: Christopher Martin Finnegan; 5 June 1944 Iver, Buckinghamshire, England
- Died: 2 March 2009 (aged 64) Uxbridge, Hillingdon
- Weight: Light Heavyweight; Middleweight

Boxing career
- Stance: Southpaw

Boxing record
- Total fights: 37
- Wins: 29
- Win by KO: 16
- Losses: 7
- Draws: 1
- No contests: 0
Medal record
Olympic Games
Gold medal – first place	1968 Mexico	Middleweight

Christopher Martin Finnegan (5 June 1944 – 2 March 2009) was an English professional boxer from Iver, Buckinghamshire. As an amateur, he won an Olympic gold medal at Middleweight in 1968.

== Early life ==
Finnegan was one of eight children; his father was from Liverpool and his mother from Newry, Northern Ireland. Finnegan always wore a Union Flag and a Shamrock on his boxing trunks to signify his joint heritage. Finnegan was introduced to boxing at a young age by his elder brother Terence. His younger brother Kevin also boxed professionally, winning the British and European middleweight titles, and fighting such opponents as Marvin Hagler and Alan Minter.

== Amateur career ==
Juggling his amateur boxing career with his work as a hod carrier, Finnegan was the 1966 ABA middleweight champion, but he considered retiring from the sport after John Turpin, the man he had beaten in the ABA finals, was chosen ahead of him to represent England at the 1966 Commonwealth Games in Jamaica. Finnegan competed at the 1967 European Amateur Boxing Championships in Rome, where he lost on points to Jan Hejduk of Czechoslovakia.

Finnegan almost missed out on making the 1968 Summer Olympics team after sustaining an eye injury which prevented him taking the ABA championships. His disappointment about not making the team resulted in a two-week drinking binge. Finnegan's trainer at his Hayes boxing club, Dick Gunn, rescued the boxer from his binge by securing a box-off which Finnegan won.

One final obstacle almost prevented Finnegan's participation in the games: £70 owed in National Insurance Stamps, for which he had to appear before a magistrate. When the presiding magistrate heard that Finnegan was due to represent Britain at the Olympics he was given a reprieve, and wished luck in his bid to win a gold medal. When the Games were over, the debt was eventually paid by the British boxing promoter Harry Levene.

Fighting in the middleweight division, Finnegan's first opponent at the Olympics was little-known Titus Simba of Tanzania; Finnegan was knocked down in the first round, but climbed off the canvas to win the decision. In the quarter-finals Finnegan guaranteed himself at least a bronze medal by out-pointing the Yugoslav Mate Parlov, who would win gold at the 1972 Olympics and later hold the WBC light-heavyweight championship.

In the semi-final, Finnegan won a 4–1 decision over the American Al Jones despite receiving two standing eight-counts. Finnegan's final opponent was Aleksei Kiselyov of the Soviet Union. Finnegan won by a 3–2 verdict, the Mexican, Spanish and Cuban judges voting for him, and the Thai and Indian for Kiselyov. Finnegan was the last British boxer to win an Olympic gold medal until Audley Harrison in 2000. For his success Finnegan was awarded an MBE in the New Year Honours, which was presented to him by the Queen Elizabeth II on 12 February 1969.

In a famous television interview conducted moments after winning gold, Finnegan's wife back in Britain, Cheryl, remarked: "Fuckin' 'ell, you 'aven't fuckin' gone and done it, 'ave you?", to which Finnegan replied: "Yes, ol' lady, I fuckin' have." When asked of his future plans, Finnegan quipped that he intended "to go home and increase the family."

Finnegan's biggest problem after his gold medal victory was producing enough urine for the doping test. It would take several glasses of water, three or four pints of beer, encouragement from others, and a victory meal before Finnegan finally had enough urine to produce for the doping test which he finally got at 1:40 AM CST. The test proved negative.

Finnegan wrote an autobiography entitled Finnegan: Self-Portrait of a Fighting Man about his boxing career, including his gold medal win at Mexico City which he referred to as a "golden rivet".

=== 1968 Olympic results ===
Chris Finnegan won an Olympic gold medal while representing Great Britain as a middleweight boxer in the 1968 Mexico City Olympics. Here are his results:

- Round of 32: Defeated Titus Simba (Tanzania) by decision, 5–0
- Round of 16: Defeated Ewald Wichert (West Germany) by decision, 3–2
- Quarterfinal: Defeated Mate Parlov (Yugoslavia) by decision, 5–0
- Semifinal: Defeated Alfred Jones (United States) by decision, 4–1
- Final: Defeated Aleksei Kiselyov (Soviet Union) by decision, 3–2 (won gold medal)

== Professional career ==
The story of an unemployed labourer winning a gold medal for Britain at the Olympics had led to the Finnegans being inundated with small donations of money from well-wishers in the UK. Finnegan had considered turning professional even before the Olympics, but his money troubles meant that he was "more or less forced to".

To manage him he hired Sam Burns, who had guided Terry Downes to the world middleweight championship in 1962. Now trained by Freddie Hill, he made his professional debut on 9 December 1968, defeating Mike Fleetham in three rounds. Finnegan won 13 of his first 14 fights, his sole loss a cut-eye stoppage against Danny Ashie. Among his early opponents were Brendan Ingle, who would later go on to be a successful boxing trainer, and Harry Scott, then the number-one ranked British middleweight contender.

In his 15th fight, Finnegan was matched with reigning European middleweight champion Tom Bogs in Copenhagen, as a late replacement for the injured Mark Rowe. Finnegan dropped a close 15-round decision, in which the referee and sole judge Herbert Tomser scored four rounds to Bogs and eleven even. Five months later, in January 1971, Finnegan stopped Eddie Avoth in the 15th round to win the British and British Commonwealth light-heavyweight titles.

In May 1971, Finnegan travelled to Berlin to challenge for the European light-heavyweight title, held by Conny Velensek of Germany. The fight was scored a draw, although several British and German reporters at ringside felt that Finnegan deserved to win. After a win over Roger Rouse, who had previously fought both Dick Tiger and Bob Foster for the world light-heavyweight title, Finnegan and Velensek met again, this time at the Nottingham Ice Rink. Finnegan won a unanimous 15-round decision to take the title.

Finnegan was named Ring Magazine's progress of the year for 1971 and was now being touted as a challenger to reigning world light-heavyweight champion Bob Foster; he was at ringside for Foster's fight with Vicente Rondon and introduced to the crowd after the fight. Finnegan made his first defence of the European title four months later against Jan Lubbers at the Royal Albert Hall, and won by an eighth-round knockout. The world title fight with Foster was arranged for 26 September 1972, to take place at Wembley.

Finnegan was considered a heavy underdog against Foster, whose previous two opponents, contenders Rondon and Mike Quarry, had lasted a combined total of six rounds before being knocked out by him. However, Finnegan proved more competitive than expected, finally being stopped by Foster in the 14th round of a gruelling contest. Afterwards, Foster commented that Finnegan had been the best-equipped of all his previous title challengers. The bout was selected as "Fight of the Year" by Ring Magazine.

Six weeks after the Foster fight, Finnegan faced Rüdiger Schmidtke at Wembley, having been ordered by the European Boxing Union to defend his European title against him or risk being stripped of it. Finnegan lost by a 12th-round TKO after sustaining a bad cut on his nose. He remained inactive for four months, before successfully defending his British and Commonwealth titles against Roy John, winning a 15-round decision at Wembley.

Finnegan's next defence of his British and Commonwealth belts was against new European champion and emerging British light-heavyweight contender John Conteh; Finnegan lost a 15-round decision. He then won a ten-round decision over Mike Quarry, before facing Conteh again. This time Finnegan was stopped on cuts after six rounds. Finnegan then dropped a decision against Johnny Frankham for the British light-heavyweight title, before avenging that loss to win the Lonsdale Belt outright. That proved to be his final fight, as Finnegan retired from boxing in 1975 after undergoing surgery to repair a detached retina. His final record stood at 29–7–1.

== Death ==
Finnegan died at the age of 64 after several weeks in Hillingdon Hospital suffering from pneumonia.

== See also ==
- List of British light-heavyweight boxing champions

== Sources ==
- Finnegan, Chris (1976). Finnegan: Self-portrait of a Fighting Man. MacDonald and Jane's. ISBN 0-354-04023-5.

Preceded by Joe Frazier W15 Muhammad Ali (8 March 1971)	Ring Magazine Fight of the Year; 1972 – Bob Foster TKO14 Chris Finnegan (26 September)	Succeeded by George Foreman TKO2 Joe Frazier (22 January 1973)
