= Alfred Jones (boxer) =

American boxer

Personal information
- Nickname: Tiger Cat
- Born: October 1, 1946 (age 79) Detroit, Michigan, U.S.
- Height: 5 ft 9 in (175 cm)
- Weight: Middleweight

Boxing career

Boxing record
- Total fights: 13
- Wins: 12
- Win by KO: 7
- Losses: 1
Medal record
Men's amateur boxing
Representing the United States
Olympic Games
Bronze medal – third place	1968 Mexico	Middleweight

Alfred "Al" Jones (born October 1, 1946 in Detroit, Michigan), nicknamed "Tiger Cat", is a former professional boxer.

== Amateur career ==
Jones won the National Golden Gloves Middleweight Championship in 1965 with a win over Dave Matthews of Buffalo, NY.

Jones went on to win the bronze medal in the 1968 Summer Olympics at 165 pounds.

=== 1968 Olympic results ===
Below are the results of Alfred Jones, an American middleweight boxer who competed at the 1968 Mexico City Olympics:

- Round of 32: Defeated Marcelo Quinones (Peru) by decision, 5-0
- Round of 16: Defeated Raúl Marrero (Cuba) by decision, 5-0
- Quarterfinals: Defeated Simon Georgiev (Bulgaria) by decision, 4-1
- Semifinals: Lost to Chris Finnegan (Great Britain) by decision, 1-4.

Jones was awarded the bronze medal in 1970 following a decision by AIBA and the IOC to recognize losing semifinalists.

== Pro career ==
Jones turned pro in 1969 and won his first 12 fights. He would retire after losing in 1971 by KO to Dave Thach.
