= Saulo Hernández =

Puerto Rican boxer

Personal information
- Nationality: Puerto Rican
- Born: 17 October 1946 (age 78); San Juan, Puerto Rico

Sport
- Sport: Boxing

Saulo Hernández (born 17 October 1946) is a Puerto Rican boxer. He competed in the men's middleweight event at the 1968 Summer Olympics. At the 1968 Summer Olympics, he lost to Raúl Marrero of Cuba.
