= Hejduk (surname) =

Hejduk is a surname. Notable people with the surname include:

- Frankie Hejduk (born 1974), American soccer player
- Jan Hejduk (born 1947), Czech boxer
- John Hejduk (1929–2000), American architect
- Milan Hejduk (born 1976), Czech ice hockey player
