= Agustín Zaragoza =

Mexican boxer (born 1941)

Agustin Zaragoza
Personal information
- Full name: Agustin Zaragoza Reyna
- Born: 18 August 1941 (age 84) San Luis Potosi, Mexico
- Height: 179 cm (5 ft 10 in)
- Weight: 75 kg (165 lb)

Sport
- Sport: Boxing
- Weight class: Light middleweight (-71 kg); Middleweight (-75 kg)
Medal record
Men's boxing
Representing Mexico
Olympic Games
Bronze medal – third place	1968 Mexico City	Middleweight
Pan American Games
Bronze medal – third place	1967 Winnipeg	Light middleweight
Bronze medal – third place	1971 Cali	Middleweight
Central American and Caribbean Games
Gold medal – first place	1970 Panama	Middleweight

Agustin Zaragoza Reyna (Note: In this Spanish name, the first or paternal surname is Zaragoza and the second or maternal family name is Reyna.) (born 18 August 1941 in San Luis Potosi) is a Mexican boxer.

He competed for Mexico in the 1968 Summer Olympics held in Mexico City, Mexico in the middleweight event where he finished in third place.
