= Antoine Abang =

Cameroonian boxer (born 1941)

Personal information
- Nationality: Cameroonian
- Born: 18 June 1941 (age 84); Bamenda, Southern Cameroons, British Cameroons
- Height: 1.66 m (5 ft 5 in)
- Weight: 75 kg (165 lb)

Sport
- Sport: Boxing
- Event: Middleweight

Antoine Abang (born 18 June 1941) is a Cameroonian boxer. He competed in the middleweight boxing competition at the 1968 Summer Olympics.
