= Nolberto Freitas =

Uruguayan boxer

Personal information
- Born: 26 January 1945; Cerro Largo, Uruguay
- Died: 21 March 2022 (aged 77)

Sport
- Sport: Boxing

Nolberto Freitas (26 January 1945 – 21 March 2022) was a Uruguayan boxer. He competed in the men's middleweight event at the 1968 Summer Olympics.
