= Misael Vilugrón =

Chilean boxer (1938–2011)

Personal information
- Nationality: Chilean
- Born: 11 February 1938
- Died: 4 June 2011 (aged 73)

Sport
- Sport: Boxing
Medal record
Men's amateur boxing
Representing Chile
Pan American Games
Gold medal – first place	1963 São Paulo	Welterweight

Misael Vilugrón (11 February 1938 – 4 June 2011) was a Chilean boxer. He competed at the 1964 Summer Olympics and the 1968 Summer Olympics. At the 1968 Summer Olympics, he lost to Jan van Ispelen of the Netherlands.
