= Kyra Downton =

American equestrian

Personal information
- Nationality: American
- Born: November 13, 1913 Vladivostok, Russia
- Died: February 6, 1999 (aged 85) Bend, Oregon, United States

Sport
- Sport: Equestrian
Medal record
Equestrian
Representing the United States
Pan American Games
Gold medal – first place	1967 Winnipeg	Individual dressage
Silver medal – second place	1967 Winnipeg	Team dressage

Kyra Downton (November 13, 1913 – February 6, 1999) was a Russian-borm American equestrian. She competed in two events at the 1968 Summer Olympics.
