= John Alstrom =

American volleyball player (born 1942)

Personal information
- Born: John Kirby Alstrom; March 29, 1942 (age 84); Fresno, California, U.S.
- Height: 6 ft 6 in (198 cm)
- Weight: 201 lb (91 kg)
Medal record
Men's volleyball
Representing the United States
Pan American Games
Gold medal – first place	1967 Winnipeg	Team

John Kirby Alstrom (born March 29, 1942) is an American former volleyball player who competed in the 1968 Summer Olympics. Alstrom was inducted into the Fresno County Athletic Hall of Fame in 1991.
