= Colleen Mulvihill =

American gymnast (1952–2019)

Personal information
- Born: June 9, 1952; Merrill, Wisconsin, United States
- Died: March 2, 2019 (aged 66)

Sport
- Sport: Gymnastics

Colleen Mulvihill (June 9, 1952 – March 2, 2019) was an American gymnast. She competed in six events at the 1968 Summer Olympics.
