= Titus Simba =

Tanzanian boxer (born 1941)

Personal information
- Nationality: Tanzanian
- Born: 30 November 1941

Sport
- Sport: Boxing

Titus Simba (born 30 November 1941, date of death unknown) was a Tanzanian boxer. He competed at the 1968 Summer Olympics and the 1972 Summer Olympics. At the 1968 Summer Olympics, he lost to Chris Finnegan of Great Britain. He also won a silver medal at the 1970 British Commonwealth Games in the middleweight category.
