= Willie Williams (basketball) =

American basketball player

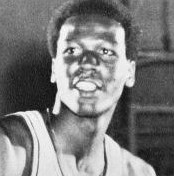

Personal information
- Born: July 28, 1946 (age 80)
- Listed height: 6 ft 7 in (2.01 m)
- Listed weight: 200 lb (91 kg)

Career information
- High school: Booker T. Washington (Miami, Florida)
- College: Miami Dade (1966–1968); Florida State (1968–1970)
- NBA draft: 1970: 3rd round, 38th overall pick
- Drafted by: Boston Celtics
- Position: Forward
- Number: 28, 15, 11

Career history
- 1970–1971: Boston Celtics
- 1971: Cincinnati Royals
- Stats at NBA.com
- Stats at Basketball Reference

Willie Earl Williams (born July 28, 1946) is a former National Basketball Association (NBA) player. Williams lettered two years in basketball at Florida State University after two years at Miami Dade Community College. In the 1968–69 season, Williams averaged 7.8 points and 9.6 rebounds per game. The following season, Williams averaged 16.9 points and 11.0 rebounds per game. He was drafted with the fourth pick in the third round of the 1970 NBA draft. After playing sixteen games with the Celtics in the 1970-71 NBA season, Williams was waived by the Celtics and then claimed off waivers by the Cincinnati Royals. In his one NBA season, Williams averaged 0.9 points and 0.9 rebounds per game.

== Career statistics ==
Legend
GP	Games played	GS	Games started	MPG	Minutes per game
FG%	Field goal percentage	3P%	3-point field goal percentage	FT%	Free throw percentage
RPG	Rebounds per game	APG	Assists per game	SPG	Steals per game
BPG	Blocks per game	PPG	Points per game	**Bold**	Career high

=== NBA ===
==== Regular season ====
Year	Team	GP	MPG	FG%	FT%	RPG	APG	PPG
1970–71	Boston	**16**	3.5	.188	**.600**	.6	.1	**.9**
1970–71	Cincinnati	9	**5.4**	**.400**	–	**1.4**	**.7**	**.9**
Career		25	4.2	.238	.600	.9	.3	.9
