= Tom Lough =

American modern pentathlete (born 1942)

Personal information
- Full name: Maurice Thomas Lough
- Born: July 14, 1942 (age 84) Harrisonburg, Virginia, United States

Sport
- Sport: Modern pentathlon

Tom Lough (born Maurice Thomas Lough, July 14, 1942) is an American modern pentathlete. He graduated from Montevideo High School in Penn Laird, Virginia, in 1960, and from the United States Military Academy at West Point, New York, in 1964. He competed in the 1968 Summer Olympics.
