= Donnan Plumb =

American equestrian

Personal information
- Born: Donnan Sharp; August 22, 1938 (age 87) Philadelphia, Pennsylvania, United States

Sport
- Sport: Equestrian
Medal record
Equestrian
Representing the United States
Pan American Games
Silver medal – second place	1967 Winnipeg	Team dressage

Donnan Plumb (née Sharp; born August 22, 1938) is an American equestrian. She competed in two events at the 1968 Summer Olympics and won a silver medal in team dressage at the 1967 Pan American Games.

== Personal life ==
Born in Philadelphia, Pennsylvania, Plumb attended both the Westover School in Middlebury, Connecticut and the Tower Hill School in Wilmington, Delaware.

She married Michael Plumb, an eventing rider who gold at the 1976 and 1984 Summer Olympics; they later divorced. The couple had three sons – Hugh, Matt and Charlie; Charlie became a successful event rider. Matt and Hugh have had a successful auto racing career in sports car racing.
