= Sabine Wichert =

German-born poet and historian from Northern Ireland

- Born: 8 June 1942; Graudenz, West Prussia
- Died: 8 September 2014 (aged 72); Belfast

Sabine Wichert (8 June 1942 – 8 September 2014), was a German born poet and historian who lived in Northern Ireland

== Biography ==
Born Sabine Wichert on 8 June 1942 in Graudenz, West Prussia which is now Grudziadz, Poland, Wichert was educated in West Germany. She studied at the University of Frankfurt, the Free University of Berlin and the University of Mannheim. She also studied at the London school of Economics and Oxford University in Britain. She first came to Belfast as a tourist.

She worked at Queen's University, Belfast from 1971 teaching history but with an interest in the visual arts. She wrote poetry about her adopted homeland and edited the work of historian ATQ Stewart. She retired in 2007. She died of lung cancer in Belfast on 8 September 2014. Wichert was cremated at Roselawn and was returned to Germany by her brothers Peter and Christian.

She was a member of the Arts Council of Northern Ireland until 1994 and she was appointed to the Board of the Tyrone Guthrie Centre by the Arts Councils of Ireland.

== Bibliography ==
=== Poetry ===
- Miranda (1993)
- Tin Drum Country (1995)
- Sharing Darwin (1999)
- Taganrog (2004)

=== Non fiction ===
- Northern Ireland Since 1945
- The British Left and Appeasement: Political Tactics or Alternative Policies?
- The Northern Ireland Conflict: New Wine in Old Bottles?
- The role of nationalism in the Northern Ireland conflict
- Northern Ireland: The Context for Conflict and for Reconciliation
