= Aleksei Kiselyov (boxer) =

Russian boxer (1938–2005)

Personal information
- Native name: Алексей Иванович Киселёв
- Born: 17 March 1938 Ryazan, Russian SFSR, Soviet Union
- Died: 19 June 2005 (aged 67) Moscow, Russia
- Height: 178 cm (5 ft 10 in)

Sport
- Sport: Boxing
- Club: CSKA Moscow
Medal record
Representing the Soviet Union
Olympic Games
Silver medal – second place	1964 Tokyo	-81 kg
Silver medal – second place	1968 Mexico City	-75 kg
European Amateur Championships
Silver medal – second place	1967 Rome	-75 kg

Aleksei Ivanovich Kiselyov (Russian: Алексей Иванович Киселёв; 17 March 1938 – 19 June 2005) was a Russian boxer. Competing for the Soviet Union in light-heavyweight and middleweight divisions he won silver medals at the 1964 and 1968 Olympics and at the 1967 European championships, losing all three finals by a close decision. He won the World Army Championships in 1958, 1961, 1962 and 1966. Kiselyov was an aggressive southpaw boxer who won many bouts by a strong counterattacking blow to the body with his left hand.

Kiselyov took up boxing in 1954. He won the Soviet titles in 1964 and 1966, finishing within the podium in other years between 1959 and 1968. He retired in 1968 after winning 225 of his 250 bouts, and in 1969–70 and 1975–80 was the head coach of the Soviet boxing team. In 1972, he defended a PhD on the reliability of soldering in metal constructions (Russian: "Прочность паяных соединений в металлоконструкциях"), and from 1975 until his death in 2005 headed the Sports Department at the Bauman Moscow State Technical University, replacing the former teammate Valery Popenchenko who died in 1975. From 1993 to 2005 Kiselyov also served as president of the Russian Student Sports Union. He died of a stomach cancer, aged 67, and was survived by wife Irina, two sons and one daughter, Svetlana.
