= Moe Barr =

American basketball player

Personal information
- Born: June 19, 1944 (age 82) Pittsburgh, Pennsylvania
- Listed height: 6 ft 4 in (1.93 m)
- Listed weight: 195 lb (88 kg)

Career information
- High school: Penn Hills (Pittsburgh, Pennsylvania)
- College: Duquesne (1966–1969)
- NBA draft: 1969: undrafted
- Playing career: 1970–1971
- Position: Guard
- Number: 19

Career history
- 1970–1971: Cincinnati Royals
- Stats at NBA.com
- Stats at Basketball Reference

Thomas L. "Moe" Barr (born June 19, 1947) is a retired American basketball player. He played collegiately for the Duquesne University.

Barr played for the Cincinnati Royals (1970–71) in the NBA for 31 games.

Barr is now a high school and collegiate referee of volleyball in Pittsburgh, Pennsylvania.

== Career statistics ==
Legend
GP	Games played	GS	Games started	MPG	Minutes per game
FG%	Field goal percentage	3P%	3-point field goal percentage	FT%	Free throw percentage
RPG	Rebounds per game	APG	Assists per game	SPG	Steals per game
BPG	Blocks per game	PPG	Points per game	**Bold**	Career high

=== NBA ===
==== Regular season ====
Year	Team	GP	MPG	FG%	FT%	RPG	APG	PPG
1970–71	Cincinnati	31	4.7	.403	.846	.6	.9	2.0
