= William Johnson (swimmer) =

American swimmer (1947–2005)

Personal information
- Full name: William Roy Johnson
- National team: United States
- Born: March 19, 1947 Santa Monica, California, U.S.
- Died: April 22, 2005 (aged 58)
- Height: 6 ft 3 in (1.91 m)
- Weight: 190 lb (86 kg)

Sport
- Sport: Swimming
- Strokes: Freestyle
- Club: Los Angeles Athletic Club
- College team: University of Southern California
- Coach: Peter Daland; USC

William Roy Johnson (March 19, 1947 – April 22, 2005) was an American competition swimmer.

Johnson represented the United States at the 1968 Summer Olympics in Mexico City. He swam for the gold medal-winning U.S. teams in the qualifying heats of the men's 4×100-meter freestyle relay and men's 4×200-meter freestyle relay. He did not, however, receive a medal for either event because only relay swimmers who competed in the event final were eligible to receive a medal under the 1968 swimming rules.

Johnson attended the University of Southern California (USC), and swam for the USC Trojans swimming and diving team in National Collegiate Athletic Association (NCAA) competition from 1967 to 1968 under the exceptional Hall of Fame Coach Peter Daland. Previously he swam for Fullerton College in 65 and 66. He was recognized as an All-American four times as a college swimmer. At the Southern California Invitational at City of Commerce, California on March 15, 1968, while swimming for USC, Johnson placed second in the 200 individual medley with at 2:01.2, edging out a young future Olympian Gary Hall by .6 seconds. At the National Short Course AAU Swimming Championships on April 13, 1968, in Greenville, North Carolina Johnson placed fourth in the 100-yard butterfly with a 51.27, 2.1 seconds behind first place Mark Spitz.

== See also ==
- List of University of Southern California people
