= Jim King (basketball, born 1943) =

American basketball player

James King
Personal information
- Born: February 9, 1943 (age 83) Akron, Ohio, U.S.
- Height: 6 ft 7 in (2.01 m)
Medal record
Men's basketball
Representing the United States
Olympic Games
Gold medal – first place	1968 Mexico City	Team competition

James H. King (born February 9, 1943) is a retired American basketball player who competed in the 1968 Summer Olympics. He was born in Akron, Ohio.

A 6-foot-7-inch (2.01 m) 200-pound (91 kg) forward, he was part of the American basketball team which won the gold medal. He played in all eight games.
