= Jan van Ispelen =

Dutch boxer

Jan van Ispelen (born 12 April 1941 in Schönebeck) is a retired boxer, who was born in Germany but competed for the Netherlands. He represented Holland at the 1968 Summer Olympics, where he was defeated in the second round of the men's middleweight (– 75 kg) division by Yugoslavia's Mate Parlov.

== 1968 Olympic results ==
Below are the results of Jan van Ispelen, a middleweight boxer who competed for the Netherlands in the 1968 Mexico City Olympics:

- Round of 32: defeated Misael Vilugron (Chile) by a second-round technical knockout
- Round of 16: lost to Mate Parlov (Yugoslavia) by decision, 1-4
