= Ewald Wichert =

German boxer (born 1940)

Personal information
- Nationality: German
- Born: 26 May 1940 (age 86) Heessen, Germany

Sport
- Sport: Boxing

Ewald Wichert (born 26 May 1940) is a German boxer. He competed in the men's middleweight event at the 1968 Summer Olympics.
