= Jan Hejduk =

Czech boxer

Personal information
- Nationality: Czechoslovak
- Born: 13 February 1947 (age 78); Modrá (part of Jílové), Czechoslovakia

Sport
- Sport: Boxing

Jan Hejduk (born 13 February 1947) is a Czech boxer. He competed in the men's middleweight event at the 1968 Summer Olympics, representing Czechoslovakia.
