= Simeon Georgiev =

Bulgarian boxer

Personal information
- Nationality: Bulgarian
- Born: 23 December 1945 (age 80) Varna, Bulgaria

Sport
- Sport: Boxing
Medal record
Men's Boxing
Representing Bulgaria
European Amateur Championships
Bronze medal – third place	1969 Bucharest	Middleweight

Simeon Georgiev (born 23 December 1945) is a Bulgarian boxer. He competed in the men's middleweight event at the 1968 Summer Olympics.
