= Tom Black (basketball) =

American basketball player (1941–2017)

Personal information
- Born: July 9, 1941 La Crosse, Wisconsin, U.S.
- Died: September 9, 2017 (aged 76) Missoula, Montana, U.S.
- Listed height: 6 ft 10 in (2.08 m)
- Listed weight: 220 lb (100 kg)

Career information
- High school: West Salem (West Salem, Wisconsin)
- College: Wisconsin (1960–1961); South Dakota State (1962–1964)
- NBA draft: 1964: 9th round, 72nd overall pick
- Drafted by: Baltimore Bullets
- Playing career: 1964–1971
- Position: Center
- Number: 12, 24

Career history
- 1964–1966: Phillips 66ers
- 1968: Akron Wingfoots
- 1970–1971: Seattle SuperSonics
- 1971: Cincinnati Royals

Career highlights
- 2× First-team All-NCC (1963, 1964)

Career NBA statistics
- Points: 299 (4.2 ppg)
- Rebounds: 259 (3.6 rpg)
- Assists: 44 (0.6 apg)
- Stats at NBA.com
- Stats at Basketball Reference

Thomas Donald Black (July 9, 1941 – September 9, 2017) was an American professional basketball player. He was a 6 ft 10 in (2.08 m), 220 lb (100 kg) center and played collegiately at the University of Wisconsin–Madison and South Dakota State University. He graduated from high school in West Salem, Wisconsin.

Black was selected by the Baltimore Bullets in the 9th round (2nd pick) of the 1964 NBA draft.

In his brief NBA career in 1970–71, he played for the Seattle SuperSonics and the Cincinnati Royals.

== Career statistics ==
Legend
GP	Games played	GS	Games started	MPG	Minutes per game
FG%	Field goal percentage	3P%	3-point field goal percentage	FT%	Free throw percentage
RPG	Rebounds per game	APG	Assists per game	SPG	Steals per game
BPG	Blocks per game	PPG	Points per game	**Bold**	Career high

=== NBA ===
==== Regular season ====
Year	Team	GP	MPG	FG%	FT%	RPG	APG	PPG
1970–71	Seattle	**55**	**14.1**	**.414**	**.699**	**4.1**	**.8**	**5.0**
1970–71	Cincinnati	16	6.3	.303	.400	2.1	.1	1.6
Career		71	12.3	.402	.648	3.6	.6	4.2
