= Glynn Saulters =

American basketball player

Personal information
- Born: February 10, 1945 (age 81) Minden, Louisiana, U.S.
- Listed height: 6 ft 2 in (1.88 m)
- Listed weight: 175 lb (79 kg)

Career information
- High school: Lisbon (Lisbon, Louisiana)
- College: Louisiana–Monroe (1964–1968)
- NBA draft: 1968: 12th round, 152nd overall pick
- Drafted by: Cincinnati Royals
- Position: Point guard
- Number: 14

Career history
- 1968–1969: New Orleans Buccaneers
- Stats at Basketball Reference
Medals
Men's basketball
Representing United States
Olympic Games
Gold medal – first place	1968 Mexico City	Team competition

Grady Glynn Saulters Jr. (born February 10, 1945) is an American former professional basketball player born in Minden, Louisiana.

A 6'2" point guard from Northeast Louisiana University (now the University of Louisiana at Monroe), Saulters competed at the 1968 Summer Olympics, where he won a gold medal with the United States national basketball team. Despite being drafted in the 12th round (152nd overall pick) of the 1968 NBA draft by the National Basketball Association's Cincinnati Royals, he played one season (1968–69) in the American Basketball Association as a member of the New Orleans Buccaneers, scoring 59 points in 22 games.
