= Calvin Fowler =

American basketball player (1940–2013)

Personal information
- Born: February 11, 1940 Pittsburgh, Pennsylvania, U.S.
- Died: March 5, 2013 (aged 73) Burlington, New Jersey, U.S.
- Listed height: 6 ft 0 in (1.83 m)
- Listed weight: 175 lb (79 kg)

Career information
- High school: Oliver (Pittsburgh, Pennsylvania)
- College: Saint Francis (PA) (1959–1962)
- NBA draft: 1962: undrafted
- Position: Point guard
- Number: 24

Career history
- 1960–1970: Akron Wingfoots
- 1969–1970: Carolina Cougars

Career highlights
- 2× AAU All-American (1967, 1968)
- Stats at Basketball Reference
Medals
Representing United States
Men's basketball
Pan American Games
Gold medal – first place	1967 Winnipeg	Team competition
Olympic Games
Gold medal – first place	1968 Mexico City	United States

Calvin B. Fowler (February 11, 1940 – March 5, 2013) was the captain of the United States gold medal basketball team at the 1967 Pan American Games. He also was co-captain of the U.S. gold medal team at the 1968 Summer Olympics. Born near Pittsburgh, he graduated from David B. Oliver High School in Pittsburgh in June 1957 and Saint Francis University in Loretto, Pennsylvania, in 1962. Calvin Fowler at David B. Oliver High School scored 61 points in a 101–35 win over Allegheny Vocational. Oliver only led 27–20 at the half on Fowler's 22 points, but Fowler poured in 39 in the final two quarters (January 1958).

In the early 1960s, Fowler was a member of the Akron Wingfoots. Fowler was an Amateur Athletic Union (AAU) All-America in 1967 and again in 1968 for Akron Goodyear Wingfoots. He would later play in the American Basketball Association for the Carolina Cougars in the 1969–70 season. He played 18 times for the United States.

He is buried in the Eastern Shore Veterans Cemetery in Hurlock, Maryland.
