= John Clawson =

American basketball player (1944–2018)

Personal information
- Born: May 15, 1944 Duluth, Minnesota, U.S.
- Died: December 15, 2018 (aged 74)
- Listed height: 6 ft 4 in (1.93 m)
- Listed weight: 200 lb (91 kg)

Career information
- High school: Naperville (Naperville, Illinois)
- College: Michigan (1963–1966)
- NBA draft: 1966: undrafted
- Position: Small forward
- Number: 32

Career history
- 1968–1969: Oakland Oaks
- Stats at Basketball Reference
Medals
Men's basketball
Representing the United States
Olympic Games
Gold medal – first place	1968 Mexico City	Team competition
Pan American Games
Gold medal – first place	1967 Winnipeg	Team competition

John Richard Clawson (May 15, 1944 – December 15, 2018) was an American basketball player.

A 6-foot-4-inch (1.93 m) small forward born in Duluth, Minnesota and from Naperville High School in Illinois, Clawson played at the University of Michigan, where his team won three Big Ten Conference titles and participated in two NCAA Final Fours. Clawson then represented the United States at the 1967 Pan American Games and the 1968 Summer Olympics, earning gold medals in basketball at both events. He also played for the United States men's national basketball team at the 1967 FIBA World Championship. From 1968 to 1969, he played for the Oakland Oaks of the American Basketball Association. He averaged 4.7 points per game with the Oaks and won a league championship in 1969.

After his basketball career ended, Clawson worked at Merrill Lynch and as a high school teacher in Danville, California. He later started his own construction company.
