= Charlie Paulk =

American basketball player

Personal information
- Born: June 14, 1946 Fitzgerald, Georgia, U.S.
- Died: October 1, 2014 (aged 68) San Diego, California, U.S.
- Listed height: 6 ft 8 in (2.03 m)
- Listed weight: 219 lb (99 kg)

Career information
- High school: Lester (Memphis, Tennessee)
- College: Tulsa (1965–1966); Northeastern State (1966–1968)
- NBA draft: 1968: 1st round, 7th overall pick
- Drafted by: Milwaukee Bucks
- Playing career: 1968–1972
- Position: Power forward
- Number: 17, 18, 42, 16

Career history
- 1968–1969: Milwaukee Bucks
- 1970–1971: Cincinnati Royals
- 1971: Chicago Bulls
- 1971–1972: New York Knicks

Career statistics
- Points: 741 (6.2 ppg)
- Rebounds: 462 (3.9 rpg)
- Assists: 41 (0.3 apg)
- Stats at NBA.com
- Stats at Basketball Reference

Charles Paulk (June 14, 1946 – October 1, 2014) was an American basketball player who spent four seasons in the National Basketball Association (NBA).

== High school career ==
Paulk played basketball for Lester High School in Memphis, Tennessee. Along with him, the 1964 team also featured Rich Jones and Claude Humphrey.

== College career ==
Due to the University of Memphis not admitting African-American players at the time, he went to the University of Tulsa. After one year, he transferred to Northeastern State, an NAIA school at the time.

== NBA career ==
Paulk was drafted by the Milwaukee Bucks in the first round of the 1968 NBA draft. That same year, he was drafted by the Army. In his first season, he played just 17 games, scoring three points per game and garnering 4.6 rebounds per game. He sat out the 1969–70 season due to military service, serving a tour of duty in Vietnam.

In 1970, the Bucks traded him along with Flynn Robinson to the Cincinnati Royals for Oscar Robertson. The following year, he was traded to the Chicago Bulls for Matt Guokas and a future draft pick. Later that year, he was again traded, this time to the New York Knicks for a second-round draft pick.

== NBA career statistics ==
Legend
GP	Games played	GS	Games started	MPG	Minutes per game
FG%	Field goal percentage	3P%	3-point field goal percentage	FT%	Free throw percentage
RPG	Rebounds per game	APG	Assists per game	SPG	Steals per game
BPG	Blocks per game	PPG	Points per game	**Bold**	Career high

=== Regular season ===
Year	Team	GP	GS	MPG	FG%	3P%	FT%	RPG	APG	SPG	BPG	PPG
1968–69	Milwaukee	17	-	12.8	.226	-	.565	4.6	0.2	-	-	3.0
1970–71	Cincinnati	**68**	-	**17.8**	**.430**	-	.603	**4.7**	0.4	-	-	**9.2**
1971–72	Chicago	7	-	8.6	.286	-	**.778**	2.1	**0.6**	-	-	3.3
1971–72	New York	28	-	5.4	.267	-	.667	1.8	0.3	-	-	1.4
Career		120	-	13.7	.392	-	.611	3.9	0.3	-	-	6.2

=== Playoffs ===
Year	Team	GP	GS	MPG	FG%	3P%	FT%	RPG	APG	SPG	BPG	PPG
1971–72	New York	**7**	-	**1.9**	**.300**	-	.000	**0.7**	0.0	-	-	**0.9**
Career		7	-	1.9	.300	-	.000	0.7	0.0	-	-	0.9

== Personal life and death ==
After his career, he became a road promotions manager for bands in the New Orleans area. Paulk had six siblings, five sisters, and one brother. He had two children, Derrek Paulk and Zonna Whitlow. He married Jacqueline Newby in 1990. Together he and Jacqueline (also an educator) co-founded Lincoln High School Boys Basketball Foundation, dedicated to teaching kids life skills using basketball. The foundation now known as Ground-Up is run by Shaun Manning, Jacqueline's son and Charles' stepson. On October 1, 2014, Paulk died of a heart attack at 68.
