= Raúl Marrero =

Cuban boxer

Personal information
- Born: 22 January 1951 (age 74); Camagüey, Cuba

Sport
- Sport: Boxing

Raúl Marrero (born 22 January 1951) is a Cuban boxer. He competed in the men's middleweight event at the 1968 Summer Olympics.
