= Mike Silliman =

American basketball player (1944–2000)

Personal information
- Born: May 5, 1944 Louisville, Kentucky, U.S.
- Died: June 16, 2000 (aged 56) Louisville, Kentucky, U.S.
- Listed height: 6 ft 6 in (1.98 m)
- Listed weight: 225 lb (102 kg)

Career information
- High school: St. Xavier (Louisville, Kentucky)
- College: Army (1963–1966)
- NBA draft: 1966: 8th round, 69th overall pick
- Drafted by: New York Knicks
- Playing career: 1970–1971
- Position: Small forward
- Number: 4, 27

Career history
- 1970–1971: Buffalo Braves

Career highlights
- Academic All-American (1964); First-team Parade All-American (1962); Kentucky Mr. Basketball (1962)
- Stats at NBA.com
- Stats at Basketball Reference
Medals
Men's basketball
Representing the United States
Olympic Games
Gold medal – first place	1968 Mexico City	Team competition
Pan American Games
Gold medal – first place	1967 Winnipeg	Team competition

Michael Barnwell Silliman (May 5, 1944 – June 16, 2000) was an American professional basketball player. He was born in Louisville, Kentucky.

== Career ==
Silliman was a 6'6" forward from West Point, where he played for coach Bob Knight and took Army to the NIT Semi-Finals in 1964, 1965, and 1966. He participated in the 1968 Summer Olympics and won a gold medal as captain of the United States national basketball team. He also played for the United States men's national basketball team at the 1967 FIBA World Championship and the 1970 FIBA World Championship. He later played one season (1970–71) with the Buffalo Braves of the National Basketball Association. Silliman scored 91 points in 36 NBA games.

Silliman had 55 scholarship offers coming out of St. Xavier High School in Kentucky. He was Army's all-time leading scorer at the time of his 1966 graduation and now stands 10th in Academy history with 1,342 points. A three-year basketball letter winner and All-American, Silliman netted more than 1,000 points without the benefit of the three-point line and without the shot clock to speed up shooting. In addition to his career averages of a double-double with 19.7 points per game and 11.5 rebounds per game, Silliman was also an Academic All-American.

Silliman also earned three letters in baseball while at West Point. He was a member of the 1966 team that finished 16-4 and won its second straight Eastern Intercollegiate Baseball League championship.

Silliman was inducted into the Army Sport Hall of Fame in 2008. His jersey (#20) was retired by West Point in January, 2015. Army is the fourth Hall of Fame to induct Silliman, joining the Kentucky Athletic, the Kentucky High School Athletic Association and St. Xavier's.

Bob Knight said on several occasions that Silliman was the best college player he ever coached.

Silliman died of a heart attack at age 56 in 2000. He is interred at Calvary Cemetery in Louisville, Kentucky.

== Career statistics ==
Legend
GP	Games played	GS	Games started	MPG	Minutes per game
FG%	Field goal percentage	3P%	3-point field goal percentage	FT%	Free throw percentage
RPG	Rebounds per game	APG	Assists per game	SPG	Steals per game
BPG	Blocks per game	PPG	Points per game	**Bold**	Career high

=== NBA ===
==== Regular season ====
Year	Team	GP	MPG	FG%	FT%	RPG	APG	PPG
1970–71	Buffalo	36	10.2	.456	.487	1.7	.6	2.5
