= Ken Spain =

American basketball player (1946–1990)

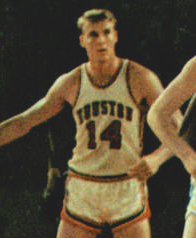
- Spain with the Houston Cougars in 1968

Personal information
- Born: October 6, 1946 Houston, Texas, U.S.
- Died: October 11, 1990 (aged 44) Houston, Texas, U.S.
- Listed height: 6 ft 9 in (2.06 m)
- Listed weight: 225 lb (102 kg)

Career information
- High school: Austin (Houston, Texas)
- College: Houston (1966–1969)
- NBA draft: 1969: 2nd round, 20th overall pick
- Drafted by: Chicago Bulls
- Playing career: 1969–1971
- Position: Center
- Number: 15

Career history
- 1969–1971: Wilmington / Delaware Blue Bombers
- 1970–1971: Pittsburgh Condors

Career highlights
- Fourth-team Parade All-American (1964)
- Stats at Basketball Reference
Medals
Men's basketball
Representing the United States
Olympic Games
Gold medal – first place	1968 Mexico City	Team competition

John Kenneth Spain (October 6, 1946 – October 11, 1990) was an American professional basketball player.

Spain was selected by the National Basketball Association's Chicago Bulls with the 20th overall pick in the 1969 NBA draft and by the Oakland Oaks in the 1969 ABA Draft. Spain played for the Wilmington / Delaware Blue Bombers of the Eastern Professional Basketball League (EPBL) / Eastern Basketball Association (EBA) from 1969 to 1971. He played in eleven American Basketball Association games during the 1970–71 season for the Pittsburgh Condors.

A 6'9" center, Spain played college basketball at the University of Houston with Elvin Hayes from 1966 to 1969. Spain graduated from Austin High School in Houston.

Spain died of cancer at the age of 44 in Houston, Texas.
