= List of Olympic medalists in boxing =

== Current program ==
=== Men's ===
==== Flyweight ====
- 1904: up to 105 lb (47.6 kg)
- 1920–1936: up to 112 lb (50.8 kg)
- 1948–1964: up to 51 kg
- 1968–2008: 48–51 kg
- 2012–2020: 49–52 kg
- 2024–present: –51 kg

Games	Gold	Silver	Bronze
1904 St. Louis	George Finnegan; United States	Miles Burke; United States	None awarded
1908–1912	not included in the Olympic program		
1920 Antwerp	Frankie Genaro; United States	Anders Petersen; Denmark	William Cuthbertson; Great Britain
1924 Paris	Fidel LaBarba; United States	James McKenzie; Great Britain	Raymond Fee; United States
1928 Amsterdam	Antal Kocsis; Hungary	Armand Apell; France	Carlo Cavagnoli; Italy
1932 Los Angeles	István Énekes; Hungary	Francisco Cabañas; Mexico	Louis Salica; United States
1936 Berlin	Willy Kaiser; Germany	Gavino Matta; Italy	Louis Laurie; United States
1948 London	Pascual Pérez; Argentina	Spartaco Bandinelli; Italy	Han Soo-ann; South Korea
1952 Helsinki	Nate Brooks; United States	Edgar Basel; Germany	Anatoli Bulakov; Soviet Union; Willie Toweel; South Africa
1956 Melbourne	Terence Spinks; Great Britain	Mircea Dobrescu; Romania	John Caldwell; Ireland; René Libeer; France
1960 Rome	Gyula Török; Hungary	Sergei Sivko; Soviet Union	Abdel Moneim El-Guindi; Egypt; Kiyoshi Tanabe; Japan
1964 Tokyo	Fernando Atzori; Italy	Artur Olech; Poland	Robert Carmody; United States; Stanislav Sorokin; Soviet Union
1968 Mexico City	Ricardo Delgado; Mexico	Artur Olech; Poland	Servílio de Oliveira; Brazil; Leo Rwabwogo; Uganda
1972 Munich	Georgi Kostadinov; Bulgaria	Leo Rwabwogo; Uganda	Leszek Błażyński; Poland; Douglas Rodríguez; Cuba
1976 Montreal	Leo Randolph; United States	Ramón Duvalón; Cuba	Leszek Błażyński; Poland; David Torosyan; Soviet Union
1980 Moscow	Petar Lesov; Bulgaria	Viktor Miroshnichenko; Soviet Union	Hugh Russell; Ireland; János Váradi; Hungary
1984 Los Angeles	Steve McCrory; United States	Redzep Redzepovski; Yugoslavia	Ibrahim Bilali; Kenya; Eyüp Can; Turkey
1988 Seoul	Kim Kwang-sun; South Korea	Andreas Tews; East Germany	Mario González; Mexico; Timofey Skryabin; Soviet Union
1992 Barcelona	Choe Chol-su; North Korea	Raúl González; Cuba	Tim Austin; United States; István Kovács; Hungary
1996 Atlanta	Maikro Romero; Cuba	Bulat Jumadilov; Kazakhstan	Zoltan Lunka; Germany; Albert Pakeyev; Russia
2000 Sydney	Wijan Ponlid; Thailand	Bulat Jumadilov; Kazakhstan	Wladimir Sidorenko; Ukraine; Jérôme Thomas; France
2004 Athens	Yuriorkis Gamboa; Cuba	Jérôme Thomas; France	Fuad Aslanov; Azerbaijan; Rustamhodza Rahimov; Germany
2008 Beijing	Somjit Jongjohor; Thailand	Andry Laffita; Cuba	Vincenzo Picardi; Italy; Georgy Balakshin; Russia
2012 London	Robeisy Ramírez; Cuba	Nyambayaryn Tögstsogt; Mongolia	Misha Aloyan; Russia; Michael Conlan; Ireland
2016 Rio de Janeiro	Shakhobidin Zoirov; Uzbekistan	Vacant	Yoel Finol; Venezuela; Hu Jianguan; China
2020 Tokyo	Galal Yafai; Great Britain	Carlo Paalam; Philippines	Ryomei Tanaka; Japan; Saken Bibossinov; Kazakhstan
2024 Paris	Hasanboy Dusmatov; Uzbekistan	Billal Bennama; France	Junior Alcántara; Dominican Republic; Daniel Varela de Pina; Cape Verde

Notes

1. The original silver medalist, Misha Aloyan of Russia, was disqualified after testing positive for tuaminoheptane.

==== Featherweight ====
- 1904: 115–125 lb (52.2–56.7 kg)
- 1908: 116–126 lb (52.6–57.2 kg)
- 1920–1928: 118–126 lb (53.5–57.2 kg)
- 1932–1936: 119–126 lb (54.0–57.2 kg)
- 1948: 54–58 kg
- 1952–2008: 54–57 kg
- 2020–present: 52–57 kg

Games	Gold	Silver	Bronze
1904 St. Louis	Oliver Kirk; United States	Frank Haller; United States	Frederick Gilmore; United States
1908 London	Richard Gunn; Great Britain	Charles Morris; Great Britain	Hugh Roddin; Great Britain
1912 Stockholm	not included in the Olympic program		
1920 Antwerp	Paul Fritsch; France	Jean Gachet; France	Edoardo Garzena; Italy
1924 Paris	Jackie Fields; United States	Joseph Salas; United States	Pedro Quartucci; Argentina
1928 Amsterdam	Bep van Klaveren; Netherlands	Víctor Peralta; Argentina	Harold Devine; United States
1932 Los Angeles	Carmelo Robledo; Argentina	Josef Schleinkofer; Germany	Allan Carlsson; Sweden
1936 Berlin	Oscar Casanovas; Argentina	Charles Catterall; South Africa	Josef Miner; Germany
1948 London	Ernesto Formenti; Italy	Dennis Shepherd; South Africa	Aleksy Antkiewicz; Poland
1952 Helsinki	Ján Zachara; Czechoslovakia	Sergio Caprari; Italy	Leonard Leisching; South Africa; Joseph Ventaja; France
1956 Melbourne	Vladimir Safronov; Soviet Union	Thomas Nicholls; Great Britain	Pentti Hämäläinen; Finland; Henryk Niedžwiedzki; Poland
1960 Rome	Francesco Musso; Italy	Jerzy Adamski; Poland	Jorma Limmonen; Finland; William Meyers; South Africa
1964 Tokyo	Stanislav Stepashkin; Soviet Union	Anthony Villanueva; Philippines	Charles Brown; United States; Heinz Schulz; United Team of Germany
1968 Mexico City	Antonio Roldán; Mexico	Alberto Robinson; United States	Ivan Mihailov; Bulgaria; Philip Waruinge; Kenya
1972 Munich	Boris Kuznetsov; Soviet Union	Philip Waruinge; Kenya	András Botos; Hungary; Clemente Rojas; Colombia
1976 Montreal	Ángel Herrera; Cuba	Richard Nowakowski; East Germany	Leszek Kosedowski; Poland; Juan Paredes; Mexico
1980 Moscow	Rudi Fink; East Germany	Adolfo Horta; Cuba	Krzysztof Kosedowski; Poland; Viktor Rybakov; Soviet Union
1984 Los Angeles	Meldrick Taylor; United States	Peter Konyegwachie; Nigeria	Türgüt Aykaç; Turkey; Omar Catari; Venezuela
1988 Seoul	Giovanni Parisi; Italy	Daniel Dumitrescu; Romania	Abdelhak Achik; Morocco; Lee Jae-Hyuk; South Korea
1992 Barcelona	Andreas Tews; Germany	Faustino Reyes; Spain	Ramaz Paliani; Unified Team; Hocine Soltani; Algeria
1996 Atlanta	Somluck Kamsing; Thailand	Serafim Todorov; Bulgaria	Pablo Chacón; Argentina; Floyd Mayweather Jr. United States
2000 Sydney	Bekzat Sattarkhanov; Kazakhstan	Ricardo Juarez; United States	Kamil Djamaloudinov; Russia; Tahar Tamsamani; Morocco
2004 Athens	Aleksei Tishchenko; Russia	Kim Song-Guk; North Korea	Jo Seok-Hwan; South Korea; Vitali Tajbert; Germany
2008 Beijing	Vasiliy Lomachenko; Ukraine	Khedafi Djelkhir; France	Yakup Kılıç; Turkey; Shahin Imranov; Azerbaijan
2012–2016	not included in the Olympic program		
2020 Tokyo	Albert Batyrgaziev; ROC	Duke Ragan; United States	Samuel Takyi; Ghana; Lázaro Álvarez; Cuba
2024 Paris	Abdumalik Khalokov; Uzbekistan	Munarbek Seiitbek Uulu; Kyrgyzstan	Charlie Senior; Australia; Javier Ibáñez; Bulgaria

==== Lightweight ====
- 1904: 125–135 lb (56.7–61.2 kg)
- 1908: 126–140 lb (57.2–63.5 kg)
- 1920–1936: 126–135 lb (57.2–61.2 kg)
- 1948: 58–62 kg
- 1952–2008: 57–60 kg
- 2012–2020: 56–60 kg
- 2024–present: 58–63.5 kg

Games	Gold	Silver	Bronze
1904 St. Louis	Harry Spanjer; United States	Russell van Horn; United States	Peter Sturholdt; United States
1908 London	Frederick Grace; Great Britain	Frederick Spiller; Great Britain	Harry Johnson; Great Britain
1912 Stockholm	not included in the Olympic program		
1920 Antwerp	Samuel Mosberg; United States	Gotfred Johansen; Denmark	Clarence Newton; Canada
1924 Paris	Hans Jacob Nielsen; Denmark	Alfredo Copello; Argentina	Frederick Boylstein; United States
1928 Amsterdam	Carlo Orlandi; Italy	Stephen Halaiko; United States	Gunnar Berggren; Sweden
1932 Los Angeles	Lawrence Stevens; South Africa	Thure Ahlqvist; Sweden	Nathan Bor; United States
1936 Berlin	Imre Harangi; Hungary	Nikolai Stepulov; Estonia	Erik Ågren; Sweden
1948 London	Gerald Dreyer; South Africa	Joseph Vissers; Belgium	Svend Wad; Denmark
1952 Helsinki	Aureliano Bolognesi; Italy	Aleksy Antkiewicz; Poland	Gheorghe Fiat; Romania; Erkki Pakkanen; Finland
1956 Melbourne	Dick McTaggart; Great Britain	Harry Kurschat; United Team of Germany	Anthony Byrne; Ireland; Anatoly Lagetko; Soviet Union
1960 Rome	Kazimierz Paździor; Poland	Sandro Lopopolo; Italy	Abel Laudonio; Argentina; Dick McTaggart; Great Britain
1964 Tokyo	Józef Grudzień; Poland	Velikton Barannikov; Soviet Union	Ronald Allen Harris; United States; Jim McCourt; Ireland
1968 Mexico City	Ronnie Harris; United States	Józef Grudzień; Poland	Calistrat Cuțov; Romania; Zvonimir Vujin; Yugoslavia
1972 Munich	Jan Szczepański; Poland	László Orbán; Hungary	Samuel Mbugua; Kenya; Alfonso Pérez; Colombia
1976 Montreal	Howard Davis; United States	Simion Cuțov; Romania	Ace Rusevski; Yugoslavia; Vassily Solomin; Soviet Union
1980 Moscow	Ángel Herrera Vera; Cuba	Viktor Demyanenko; Soviet Union	Kazimierz Adach; Poland; Richard Nowakowski; East Germany
1984 Los Angeles	Pernell Whitaker; United States	Luis Ortiz; Puerto Rico	Chun Chil-Sung; South Korea; Martin Ndongo-Ebanga; Cameroon
1988 Seoul	Andreas Zülow; East Germany	George Cramne; Sweden	Romallis Ellis; United States; Nergüin Enkhbat; Mongolia
1992 Barcelona	Oscar De La Hoya; United States	Marco Rudolph; Germany	Namjilyn Bayarsaikhan; Mongolia; Hong Sung-Sik; South Korea
1996 Atlanta	Hocine Soltani; Algeria	Tontcho Tontchev; Bulgaria	Terrance Cauthen; United States; Leonard Doroftei; Romania
2000 Sydney	Mario Kindelán; Cuba	Andreas Kotelnik; Ukraine	Cristián Bejarano; Mexico; Alexander Maletin; Russia
2004 Athens	Mario Kindelán; Cuba	Amir Khan; Great Britain	Murat Khrachev; Russia; Serik Yeleuov; Kazakhstan
2008 Beijing	Aleksei Tishchenko; Russia	Daouda Sow; France	Hrachik Javakhyan; Armenia; Yordenis Ugás; Cuba
2012 London	Vasiliy Lomachenko; Ukraine	Han Soon-Chul; South Korea	Evaldas Petrauskas; Lithuania; Yasniel Toledo; Cuba
2016 Rio de Janeiro	Robson Conceição; Brazil	Sofiane Oumiha; France	Lázaro Álvarez; Cuba; Dorjnyambuugiin Otgondalai; Mongolia
2020 Tokyo	Andy Cruz; Cuba	Keyshawn Davis; United States	Hovhannes Bachkov; Armenia; Harry Garside; Australia
2024 Paris	Erislandy Álvarez; Cuba	Sofiane Oumiha; France	Wyatt Sanford; Canada; Lasha Guruli; Georgia

==== Welterweight ====
- 1904: 135–145 lb (61.2–65.8 kg)
- 1920–1936: 135–147 lb (61.2–66.7 kg)
- 1948: 62–67 kg
- 1952–2000: 63.5–67 kg
- 2004–2020: 64–69 kg
- 2024–present: 64–71 kg

Games	Gold	Silver	Bronze
1904 St. Louis	Albert Young; United States	Harry Spanjer; United States	Joseph Lydon; United States
1908–1912	not included in the Olympic program		
1920 Antwerp	Bert Schneider; Canada	Alexander Ireland; Great Britain	Frederick Colberg; United States
1924 Paris	Jean Delarge; Belgium	Héctor Méndez; Argentina	Douglas Lewis; Canada
1928 Amsterdam	Ted Morgan; New Zealand	Raúl Landini; Argentina	Raymond Smillie; Canada
1932 Los Angeles	Edward Flynn; United States	Erich Campe; Germany	Bruno Ahlberg; Finland
1936 Berlin	Sten Suvio; Finland	Michael Murach; Germany	Gerhard Pedersen; Denmark
1948 London	Július Torma; Czechoslovakia	Hank Herring; United States	Alessandro D'Ottavio; Italy
1952 Helsinki	Zygmunt Chychła; Poland	Sergei Scherbakov; Soviet Union	Günther Heidemann; Germany; Victor Jörgensen; Denmark
1956 Melbourne	Nicolae Linca; Romania	Frederick Tiedt; Ireland	Nicholas Gargano; Great Britain; Kevin Hogarth; Australia
1960 Rome	Nino Benvenuti; Italy	Yuri Radonyak; Soviet Union	Leszek Drogosz; Poland; Jimmy Lloyd; Great Britain
1964 Tokyo	Marian Kasprzyk; Poland	Ričardas Tamulis; Soviet Union	Silvano Bertini; Italy; Pertti Purhonen; Finland
1968 Mexico City	Manfred Wolke; East Germany	Joseph Bessala; Cameroon	Mario Guilloti; Argentina; Vladimir Musalimov; Soviet Union
1972 Munich	Emilio Correa; Cuba	János Kajdi; Hungary	Dick Murunga; Kenya; Jesse Valdez; United States
1976 Montreal	Jochen Bachfeld; East Germany	Pedro Gamarro; Venezuela	Reinhard Skricek; West Germany; Victor Zilberman; Romania
1980 Moscow	Andrés Aldama; Cuba	John Mugabi; Uganda	Karl-Heinz Krüger; East Germany; Kazimierz Szczerba; Poland
1984 Los Angeles	Mark Breland; United States	An Young-Su; South Korea	Luciano Bruno; Italy; Joni Nyman; Finland
1988 Seoul	Robert Wangila; Kenya	Laurent Boudouani; France	Jan Dydak; Poland; Kenneth Gould; United States
1992 Barcelona	Michael Carruth; Ireland	Juan Hernández Sierra; Cuba	Aníbal Santiago Acevedo; Puerto Rico; Arkhom Chenglai; Thailand
1996 Atlanta	Oleg Saitov; Russia	Juan Hernández Sierra; Cuba	Daniel Santos; Puerto Rico; Marian Simion; Romania
2000 Sydney	Oleg Saitov; Russia	Sergey Dotsenko; Ukraine	Vitalie Grușac; Moldova; Dorel Simion; Romania
2004 Athens	Bakhtiyar Artayev; Kazakhstan	Lorenzo Aragón; Cuba	Kim Jung-Joo; South Korea; Oleg Saitov; Russia
2008 Beijing	Bakhyt Sarsekbayev; Kazakhstan	Carlos Banteaux; Cuba	Hanati Silamu; China; Kim Jung-Joo; South Korea
2012 London	Serik Sapiyev; Kazakhstan	Fred Evans; Great Britain	Taras Shelestyuk; Ukraine; Andrey Zamkovoy; Russia
2016 Rio de Janeiro	Daniyar Yeleussinov; Kazakhstan	Shakhram Giyasov; Uzbekistan	Mohammed Rabii; Morocco; Souleymane Cissokho; France
2020 Tokyo	Roniel Iglesias; Cuba	Pat McCormack; Great Britain	Aidan Walsh; Ireland; Andrey Zamkovoy; ROC
2024 Paris	Asadkhuja Muydinkhujaev; Uzbekistan	Marco Verde; Mexico	Omari Jones; United States; Lewis Richardson; Great Britain

==== Middleweight ====
- 1904: 145–158 lb (65.8–71.7 kg)
- 1908: 140–158 lb (63.5–71.7 kg)
- 1920–1936: 147–160 lb (66.7–72.6 kg)
- 1948: 67–73 kg
- 1952–2000: 71–75 kg
- 2004–2020: 69–75 kg
- 2024–present: 72–80 kg

Games	Gold	Silver	Bronze
1904 St. Louis	Charles Mayer; United States	Benjamin Spradley; United States	None awarded
1908 London	John Douglas; Great Britain	Reginald Baker; Australasia	William Philo; Great Britain
1912 Stockholm	not included in the Olympic program		
1920 Antwerp	Harry Mallin; Great Britain	Georges Prud'Homme; Canada	Moe Herscovitch; Canada
1924 Paris	Harry Mallin; Great Britain	John Elliott; Great Britain	Joseph Jules Beecken; Belgium
1928 Amsterdam	Piero Toscani; Italy	Jan Heřmánek; Czechoslovakia	Leonard Steyaert; Belgium
1932 Los Angeles	Carmen Barth; United States	Amado Azar; Argentina	Ernest Peirce; South Africa
1936 Berlin	Jean Despeaux; France	Henry Tiller; Norway	Raúl Villarreal; Argentina
1948 London	László Papp; Hungary	John Wright; Great Britain	Ivano Fontana; Italy
1952 Helsinki	Floyd Patterson; United States	Vasile Tiță; Romania	Boris Nikolov; Bulgaria; Stig Sjölin; Sweden
1956 Melbourne	Gennadiy Shatkov; Soviet Union	Ramón Tapia; Chile	Gilbert Chapron; France; Víctor Zalazar; Argentina
1960 Rome	Eddie Crook Jr. United States	Tadeusz Walasek; Poland	Yevgeny Feofanov; Soviet Union; Ion Monea; Romania
1964 Tokyo	Valeri Popenchenko; Soviet Union	Emil Schulz; United Team of Germany	Franco Valle; Italy; Tadeusz Walasek; Poland
1968 Mexico City	Chris Finnegan; Great Britain	Aleksei Kiselyov; Soviet Union	Alfred Jones; United States; Agustín Zaragoza; Mexico
1972 Munich	Vyacheslav Lemeshev; Soviet Union	Reima Virtanen; Finland	Prince Amartey; Ghana; Marvin Johnson; United States
1976 Montreal	Michael Spinks; United States	Rufat Riskiyev; Soviet Union	Luis Martínez; Cuba; Alec Năstac; Romania
1980 Moscow	José Gómez Mustelier; Cuba	Viktor Savchenko; Soviet Union	Jerzy Rybicki; Poland; Valentin Silaghi; Romania
1984 Los Angeles	Shin Joon-sup; South Korea	Virgil Hill; United States	Aristides González; Puerto Rico; Mohamed Zaoui; Algeria
1988 Seoul	Henry Maske; East Germany	Egerton Marcus; Canada	Chris Sande; Kenya; Hussain Shah Syed; Pakistan
1992 Barcelona	Ariel Hernández; Cuba	Chris Byrd; United States	Chris Johnson; Canada; Lee Seung-Bae; South Korea
1996 Atlanta	Ariel Hernández; Cuba	Malik Beyleroğlu; Turkey	Mohamed Bahari; Algeria; Rhoshii Wells; United States
2000 Sydney	Jorge Gutiérrez; Cuba	Gaydarbek Gaydarbekov; Russia	Vugar Alakbarov; Azerbaijan; Zsolt Erdei; Hungary
2004 Athens	Gaydarbek Gaydarbekov; Russia	Gennady Golovkin; Kazakhstan	Andre Dirrell; United States; Prasathinphimai Suriya; Thailand
2008 Beijing	James DeGale; Great Britain	Emilio Correa; Cuba	Darren Sutherland; Ireland; Vijender Singh; India
2012 London	Ryōta Murata; Japan	Esquiva Falcão; Brazil	Anthony Ogogo; Great Britain; Abbos Atoev; Uzbekistan
2016 Rio de Janeiro	Arlen López; Cuba	Bektemir Melikuziev; Uzbekistan	Kamran Shakhsuvarly; Azerbaijan; Misael Rodríguez; Mexico
2020 Tokyo	Hebert Conceição; Brazil	Oleksandr Khyzhniak; Ukraine	Eumir Marcial; Philippines; Gleb Bakshi; ROC
2024 Paris	Oleksandr Khyzhniak; Ukraine	Nurbek Oralbay; Kazakhstan	Cristian Pinales; Dominican Republic; Arlen López; Cuba

==== Heavyweight ====
- 1904–1908: over 158 lb (71.7 kg)
- 1920–1936: over 175 lb (79.4 kg)
- 1948: over 80 kg
- 1952–1980: over 81 kg
- 1984–2020: 81–91 kg
- 2024-present: 81–92 kg

Games	Gold	Silver	Bronze
1904 St. Louis	Samuel Berger; United States	Charles Mayer; United States	William Michaels; United States
1908 London	Albert Oldman; Great Britain	Sydney Evans; Great Britain	Frederick Parks; Great Britain
1912 Stockholm	not included in the Olympic program		
1920 Antwerp	Ronald Rawson; Great Britain	Søren Petersen; Denmark	Albert Eluère; France
1924 Paris	Otto von Porat; Norway	Søren Petersen; Denmark	Alfredo Porzio; Argentina
1928 Amsterdam	Arturo Rodríguez; Argentina	Nils Ramm; Sweden	Michael Michaelsen; Denmark
1932 Los Angeles	Santiago Lovell; Argentina	Luigi Rovati; Italy	Frederick Feary; United States
1936 Berlin	Herbert Runge; Germany	Guillermo Lovell; Argentina	Erling Nilsen; Norway
1948 London	Rafael Iglesias; Argentina	Gunnar Nilsson; Sweden	John Arthur; South Africa
1952 Helsinki	Ed Sanders; United States	Ingemar Johansson; Sweden	Ilkka Koski; Finland; Andries Nieman; South Africa
1956 Melbourne	Pete Rademacher; United States	Lev Mukhin; Soviet Union	Daniel Bekker; South Africa; Giacomo Bozzano; Italy
1960 Rome	Franco De Piccoli; Italy	Daniel Bekker; South Africa	Josef Němec; Czechoslovakia; Günter Siegmund; United Team of Germany
1964 Tokyo	Joe Frazier; United States	Hans Huber; United Team of Germany	Giuseppe Ros; Italy; Vadim Yemelyanov; Soviet Union
1968 Mexico City	George Foreman; United States	Jonas Čepulis; Soviet Union	Giorgio Bambini; Italy; Joaquín Rocha; Mexico
1972 Munich	Teófilo Stevenson; Cuba	Ion Alexe; Romania	Peter Hussing; West Germany; Hasse Thomsén; Sweden
1976 Montreal	Teófilo Stevenson; Cuba	Mircea Șimon; Romania	Clarence Hill; Bermuda; John Tate; United States
1980 Moscow	Teófilo Stevenson; Cuba	Pyotr Zayev; Soviet Union	Jürgen Fanghänel; East Germany; István Lévai; Hungary
1984 Los Angeles	Henry Tillman; United States	Willie DeWit; Canada	Angelo Musone; Italy; Arnold Vanderlyde; Netherlands
1988 Seoul	Ray Mercer; United States	Baik Hyun-Man; South Korea	Andrzej Gołota; Poland; Arnold Vanderlyde; Netherlands
1992 Barcelona	Félix Savón; Cuba	David Izonritei; Nigeria	David Tua; New Zealand; Arnold Vanderlyde; Netherlands
1996 Atlanta	Félix Savón; Cuba	David Defiagbon; Canada	Nate Jones; United States; Luan Krasniqi; Germany
2000 Sydney	Félix Savón; Cuba	Sultan Ibragimov; Russia	Vladimer Chanturia; Georgia; Sebastian Köber; Germany
2004 Athens	Odlanier Solís; Cuba	Viktor Zuyev; Belarus	Mohamed Elsayed; Egypt; Naser Al Shami; Syria
2008 Beijing	Rakhim Chakhkiev; Russia	Clemente Russo; Italy	Osmay Acosta; Cuba; Deontay Wilder; United States
2012 London	Oleksandr Usyk; Ukraine	Clemente Russo; Italy	Tervel Pulev; Bulgaria; Teymur Mammadov; Azerbaijan
2016 Rio de Janeiro	Evgeny Tishchenko; Russia	Vasiliy Levit; Kazakhstan	Erislandy Savón; Cuba; Rustam Tulaganov; Uzbekistan
2020 Tokyo	Julio César La Cruz; Cuba	Muslim Gadzhimagomedov; ROC	David Nyika; New Zealand; Abner Teixeira; Brazil
2024 Paris	Lazizbek Mullojonov; Uzbekistan	Loren Alfonso; Azerbaijan	Enmanuel Reyes; Spain; Davlat Boltaev; Tajikistan

==== Super heavyweight ====
- 1984–2020: over 91 kg
- 2024–present: over 92 kg

Games	Gold	Silver	Bronze
1984 Los Angeles	Tyrell Biggs; United States	Francesco Damiani; Italy	Aziz Salihu; Yugoslavia; Robert Wells; Great Britain
1988 Seoul	Lennox Lewis; Canada	Riddick Bowe; United States	Aleksandr Miroshnichenko; Soviet Union; Janusz Zarenkiewicz; Poland
1992 Barcelona	Roberto Balado; Cuba	Richard Igbineghu; Nigeria	Svilen Rusinov; Bulgaria; Brian Nielsen; Denmark
1996 Atlanta	Wladimir Klitschko; Ukraine	Paea Wolfgram; Tonga	Alexei Lezin; Russia; Duncan Dokiwari; Nigeria
2000 Sydney	Audley Harrison; Great Britain	Mukhtarkhan Dildabekov; Kazakhstan	Paolo Vidoz; Italy; Rustam Saidov; Uzbekistan
2004 Athens	Alexander Povetkin; Russia	Mohamed Aly; Egypt	Michel Lopez Nuñez; Cuba; Roberto Cammarelle; Italy
2008 Beijing	Roberto Cammarelle; Italy	Zhang Zhilei; China	Vyacheslav Glazkov; Ukraine; David Price; Great Britain
2012 London	Anthony Joshua; Great Britain	Roberto Cammarelle; Italy	Ivan Dychko; Kazakhstan; Magomedrasul Majidov; Azerbaijan
2016 Rio de Janeiro	Tony Yoka; France	Joe Joyce; Great Britain	Filip Hrgović; Croatia; Ivan Dychko; Kazakhstan
2020 Tokyo	Bakhodir Jalolov; Uzbekistan	Richard Torrez; United States	Frazer Clarke; Great Britain; Kamshybek Kunkabayev; Kazakhstan
2024 Paris	Bakhodir Jalolov; Uzbekistan	Ayoub Ghadfa; Spain	Nelvie Tiafack; Germany; Djamili-Dini Aboudou Moindze; France

=== Women's ===
==== Flyweight ====
Games	Gold	Silver	Bronze
2012 London	Nicola Adams; Great Britain	Ren Cancan; China	Marlen Esparza; United States; Mary Kom; India
2016 Rio de Janeiro	Nicola Adams; Great Britain	Sarah Ourahmoune; France	Ren Cancan; China; Ingrit Valencia; Colombia
2020 Tokyo	Stoyka Krasteva; Bulgaria	Buse Naz Çakıroğlu; Turkey	Huang Hsiao-wen; Chinese Taipei; Tsukimi Namiki; Japan
2024 Paris	Wu Yu; China	Buse Naz Çakıroğlu; Turkey	Nazym Kyzaibay; Kazakhstan; Aira Villegas; Philippines

==== Bantamweight ====
Games	Gold	Silver	Bronze
2024 Paris	Chang Yuan; China	Hatice Akbaş; Turkey	Pang Chol-mi; North Korea; Im Ae-ji; South Korea

==== Featherweight ====
Games	Gold	Silver	Bronze
2020 Tokyo	Sena Irie; Japan	Nesthy Petecio; Philippines	Irma Testa; Italy; Karriss Artingstall; Great Britain
2024 Paris	Lin Yu-ting; Chinese Taipei	Julia Szeremeta; Poland	Esra Yıldız; Turkey; Nesthy Petecio; Philippines

==== Lightweight ====
Games	Gold	Silver	Bronze
2012 London	Katie Taylor; Ireland	Sofya Ochigava; Russia	Mavzuna Chorieva; Tajikistan; Adriana Araujo; Brazil
2016 Rio de Janeiro	Estelle Mossely; France	Yin Junhua; China	Anastasia Belyakova; Russia; Mira Potkonen; Finland
2020 Tokyo	Kellie Harrington; Ireland	Beatriz Ferreira; Brazil	Sudaporn Seesondee; Thailand; Mira Potkonen; Finland
2024 Paris	Kellie Harrington; Ireland	Yang Wenlu; China	Wu Shih-yi; Chinese Taipei; Beatriz Ferreira; Brazil

==== Welterweight ====
Games	Gold	Silver	Bronze
2020 Tokyo	Busenaz Sürmeneli; Turkey	Gu Hong; China	Lovlina Borgohain; India; Oshae Jones; United States
2024 Paris	Imane Khelif; Algeria	Yang Liu; China	Janjaem Suwannapheng; Thailand; Chen Nien-chin; Chinese Taipei

==== Middleweight ====
Games	Gold	Silver	Bronze
2012 London	Claressa Shields; United States	Nadezda Torlopova; Russia	Marina Volnova; Kazakhstan; Li Jinzi; China
2016 Rio de Janeiro	Claressa Shields; United States	Nouchka Fontijn; Netherlands	Dariga Shakimova; Kazakhstan; Li Qian; China
2020 Tokyo	Lauren Price; Great Britain	Li Qian; China	Nouchka Fontijn; Netherlands; Zemfira Magomedalieva; ROC
2024 Paris	Li Qian; China	Atheyna Bylon; Panama	Caitlin Parker; Australia; Cindy Ngamba; Refugee Olympic Team

== Discontinued events ==
=== Men's ===
==== Light flyweight ====
- 1968–2008: up to 48 kg.
- 2012–2016: up to 49 kg.

Games	Gold	Silver	Bronze
1968 Mexico City	Francisco Rodríguez; Venezuela	Jee Yong-ju; South Korea	Harlan Marbley; United States; Hubert Skrzypczak; Poland
1972 Munich	György Gedó; Hungary	Kim U-gil; North Korea	Ralph Evans; Great Britain; Enrique Rodríguez; Spain
1976 Montreal	Jorge Hernández; Cuba	Ri Byong-uk; North Korea	Orlando Maldonado; Puerto Rico; Payao Pooltarat; Thailand
1980 Moscow	Shamil Sabirov; Soviet Union	Hipólito Ramos; Cuba	Ismail Mustafov; Bulgaria; Lee Byong-Uk; North Korea
1984 Los Angeles	Paul Gonzales; United States	Salvatore Todisco; Italy	Marcelino Bolivar; Venezuela; Keith Mwila; Zambia
1988 Seoul	Ivailo Marinov; Bulgaria	Michael Carbajal; United States	Róbert Isaszegi; Hungary; Leopoldo Serrantes; Philippines
1992 Barcelona	Rogelio Marcelo; Cuba	Daniel Petrov; Bulgaria	Jan Quast; Germany; Roel Velasco; Philippines
1996 Atlanta	Daniel Petrov; Bulgaria	Mansueto Velasco; Philippines	Oleg Kiryukhin; Ukraine; Rafael Lozano; Spain
2000 Sydney	Brahim Asloum; France	Rafael Lozano; Spain	Kim Un-chol; North Korea; Maikro Romero; Cuba
2004 Athens	Yan Bartelemí Varela; Cuba	Atagün Yalçinkaya; Turkey	Zou Shiming; China; Sergey Kazakov; Russia
2008 Beijing	Zou Shiming; China	Pürevdorjiin Serdamba; Mongolia	Paddy Barnes; Ireland; Yampier Hernández; Cuba
2012 London	Zou Shiming; China	Kaeo Pongprayoon; Thailand	Paddy Barnes; Ireland; David Ayrapetyan; Russia
2016 Rio de Janeiro	Hasanboy Dusmatov; Uzbekistan	Yuberjen Martínez; Colombia	Joahnys Argilagos; Cuba; Nico Hernández; United States

==== Bantamweight ====
- 1904: 105–115 lb (47.6–52.2 kg)
- 1908: up to 116 lb (52.6 kg)
- 1920–1928: 112–118 lb (50.8–53.5 kg)
- 1932–1936: 112–119 lb (50.8–54.0 kg)
- 1948–2008: 51–54 kg
- 2012–2016: 52–56 kg

Games	Gold	Silver	Bronze
1904 St. Louis	Oliver Kirk; United States	George Finnegan; United States	None awarded
1908 London	Henry Thomas; Great Britain	John Condon; Great Britain	William Webb; Great Britain
1912 Stockholm	not included in the Olympic program		
1920 Antwerp	Clarence Walker; South Africa	Clifford Graham; Canada	George McKenzie; Great Britain
1924 Paris	William Smith; South Africa	Salvatore Tripoli; United States	Jean Ces; France
1928 Amsterdam	Vittorio Tamagnini; Italy	John Daley; United States	Harry Isaacs; South Africa
1932 Los Angeles	Horace Gwynne; Canada	Hans Ziglarski; Germany	José Villanueva; Philippines
1936 Berlin	Ulderico Sergo; Italy	Jack Wilson; United States	Fidel Ortiz; Mexico
1948 London	Tibor Csík; Hungary	Giovanni Battista Zuddas; Italy	Juan Venegas; Puerto Rico
1952 Helsinki	Pentti Hämäläinen; Finland	John McNally; Ireland	Gennady Garbuzov; Soviet Union; Kang Joon-Ho; South Korea
1956 Melbourne	Wolfgang Behrendt; United Team of Germany	Song Soon-Chun; South Korea	Claudio Barrientos; Chile; Frederick Gilroy; Ireland
1960 Rome	Oleg Grigoryev; Soviet Union	Primo Zamparini; Italy	Brunon Bendig; Poland; Oliver Taylor; Australia
1964 Tokyo	Takao Sakurai; Japan	Chung Shin-Cho; South Korea	Juan Fabila Mendoza; Mexico; Washington Rodríguez; Uruguay
1968 Mexico City	Valerian Sokolov; Soviet Union	Eridari Mukwanga; Uganda	Chang Kyou-Chul; South Korea; Eiji Morioka; Japan
1972 Munich	Orlando Martínez; Cuba	Alfonso Zamora; Mexico	Ricardo Carreras; United States; George Turpin; Great Britain
1976 Montreal	Ku Yong-jo (PRK)	Charles Mooney; United States	Patrick Cowdell; Great Britain; Viktor Rybakov; Soviet Union
1980 Moscow	Juan Bautista Hernández Pérez; Cuba	Bernardo Pinango; Venezuela	Michael Anthony; Guyana; Dumitru Cipere; Romania
1984 Los Angeles	Maurizio Stecca; Italy	Héctor López; Mexico	Pedro Nolasco; Dominican Republic; Dale Walters; Canada
1988 Seoul	Kennedy McKinney; United States	Aleksandar Khristov; Bulgaria	Phajol Moolsan; Thailand; Jorge Eliécer Julio; Colombia
1992 Barcelona	Joel Casamayor; Cuba	Wayne McCullough; Ireland	Mohammed Achik; Morocco; Li Gwang-Sik; North Korea
1996 Atlanta	István Kovács; Hungary	Arnaldo Mesa; Cuba	Vichairachanon Khadpo; Thailand; Raimkul Malakhbekov; Russia
2000 Sydney	Guillermo Rigondeaux; Cuba	Raimkul Malakhbekov; Russia	Sergey Danilchenko; Ukraine; Clarence Vinson; United States
2004 Athens	Guillermo Rigondeaux; Cuba	Worapoj Petchkoom; Thailand	Aghasi Mammadov; Azerbaijan; Bahodirjon Sooltonov; Uzbekistan
2008 Beijing	Enkhbatyn Badar-Uugan; Mongolia	Yankiel León Alarcón; Cuba	Bruno Julie; Mauritius; Veaceslav Gojan; Moldova
2012 London	Luke Campbell; Great Britain	John Joe Nevin; Ireland	Lázaro Álvarez; Cuba; Satoshi Shimizu; Japan
2016 Rio de Janeiro	Robeisy Ramírez; Cuba	Shakur Stevenson; United States	Vladimir Nikitin; Russia; Murodjon Akhmadaliev; Uzbekistan

==== Light welterweight ====
- 1952–2000: 60–63.5 kg
- 2004–2016: 60–64 kg

Games	Gold	Silver	Bronze
1952 Helsinki	Charles Adkins; United States	Viktor Mednov; Soviet Union	Erkki Mallenius; Finland; Bruno Visintin; Italy
1956 Melbourne	Vladimir Yengibaryan; Soviet Union	Franco Nenci; Italy	Constantin Dumitrescu; Romania; Henry Loubscher; South Africa
1960 Rome	Bohumil Němeček; Czechoslovakia	Clement Quartey; Ghana	Quincey Daniels; United States; Marian Kasprzyk; Poland
1964 Tokyo	Jerzy Kulej; Poland	Yevgeny Frolov; Soviet Union	Eddie Blay; Ghana; Habib Galhia; Tunisia
1968 Mexico City	Jerzy Kulej; Poland	Enrique Requeiferos; Cuba	Arto Nilsson; Finland; Jim Wallington; United States
1972 Munich	Ray Seales; United States	Angel Angelov; Bulgaria	Issaka Daborg; Niger; Zvonimir Vujin; Yugoslavia
1976 Montreal	Ray Leonard; United States	Andrés Aldama; Cuba	Vladimir Kolev; Bulgaria; Kazimierz Szczerba; Poland
1980 Moscow	Patrizio Oliva; Italy	Serik Konakbayev; Soviet Union	José Aguilar; Cuba; Tony Willis; Great Britain
1984 Los Angeles	Jerry Page (USA)	Dhawee Umponmaha; Thailand	Mircea Fulger; Romania; Mirko Puzović; Yugoslavia
1988 Seoul	Vyacheslav Yanovskiy; Soviet Union	Grahame Cheney; Australia	Reiner Gies; West Germany; Lars Myrberg; Sweden
1992 Barcelona	Héctor Vinent; Cuba	Mark Leduc; Canada	Leonard Doroftei; Romania; Jyri Kjäll; Finland
1996 Atlanta	Héctor Vinent; Cuba	Oktay Urkal; Germany	Fethi Missaoui; Tunisia; Bolat Niyazymbetov; Kazakhstan
2000 Sydney	Muhammad Abdullaev; Uzbekistan	Ricardo Williams; United States	Mohamed Allalou; Algeria; Diógenes Luña; Cuba
2004 Athens	Manus Boonjumnong; Thailand	Yudel Johnson Cedeno; Cuba	Boris Georgiev; Bulgaria; Ionuț Gheorghe; Romania
2008 Beijing	Manuel Félix Díaz; Dominican Republic	Manus Boonjumnong; Thailand	Roniel Iglesias; Cuba; Alexis Vastine; France
2012 London	Roniel Iglesias; Cuba	Denys Berinchyk; Ukraine	Vincenzo Mangiacapre; Italy; Uranchimegiin Mönkh-Erdene; Mongolia
2016 Rio de Janeiro	Fazliddin Gaibnazarov; Uzbekistan	Lorenzo Sotomayor; Azerbaijan	Artem Harutyunyan; Germany; Vitaly Dunaytsev; Russia

==== Light middleweight ====
- 1952–2000: 67–71 kg

Games	Gold	Silver	Bronze
1952 Helsinki	László Papp; Hungary	Theunis van Schalkwyk; South Africa	Eladio Herrera; Argentina; Boris Tishin; Soviet Union
1956 Melbourne	László Papp; Hungary	José Torres; United States	John McCormack; Great Britain; Zbigniew Pietrzykowski; Poland
1960 Rome	Wilbert McClure; United States	Carmelo Bossi; Italy	William Fisher; Great Britain; Boris Lagutin; Soviet Union
1964 Tokyo	Boris Lagutin; Soviet Union	Joseph Gonzales; France	Józef Grzesiak; Poland; Nojim Maiyegun; Nigeria
1968 Mexico City	Boris Lagutin; Soviet Union	Rolando Garbey; Cuba	John Baldwin; United States; Günther Meier; West Germany
1972 Munich	Dieter Kottysch; West Germany	Wiesław Rudkowski; Poland	Alan Minter; Great Britain; Peter Tiepold; East Germany
1976 Montreal	Jerzy Rybicki; Poland	Tadija Kačar; Yugoslavia	Rolando Garbey; Cuba; Viktor Savchenko; Soviet Union
1980 Moscow	Armando Martínez; Cuba	Aleksandr Koshkyn; Soviet Union	Ján Franek; Czechoslovakia; Detlef Kästner; East Germany
1984 Los Angeles	Frank Tate; United States	Shawn O'Sullivan; Canada	Christophe Tiozzo; France; Manfred Zielonka; West Germany
1988 Seoul	Park Si-Hun; South Korea	Roy Jones Jr. United States	Ray Downey; Canada; Richie Woodhall; Great Britain
1992 Barcelona	Juan Carlos Lemus; Cuba	Orhan Delibaş; Netherlands	György Mizsei; Hungary; Robin Reid; Great Britain
1996 Atlanta	David Reid; United States	Alfredo Duvergal; Cuba	Yermakhan Ibraimov; Kazakhstan; Karim Tulaganov; Uzbekistan
2000 Sydney	Yermakhan Ibraimov; Kazakhstan	Marian Simion; Romania	Jermain Taylor; United States; Pornchai Thongburan; Thailand

==== Light heavyweight ====
- 1920–1936: 160–175 lb (72.6–79.4 kg)
- 1948: 73–80 kg
- 1952–2020: 75–81 kg

Games	Gold	Silver	Bronze
1920 Antwerp	Eddie Eagan; United States	Sverre Sørsdal; Norway	Harold Franks; Great Britain
1924 Paris	Harry Mitchell; Great Britain	Thyge Petersen; Denmark	Sverre Sørsdal; Norway
1928 Amsterdam	Víctor Avendaño; Argentina	Ernst Pistulla; Germany	Karel Miljon; Netherlands
1932 Los Angeles	David Carstens; South Africa	Gino Rossi; Italy	Peter Jørgensen; Denmark
1936 Berlin	Roger Michelot; France	Richard Vogt; Germany	Francisco Risiglione; Argentina
1948 London	George Hunter; South Africa	Don Scott; Great Britain	Mauro Cía; Argentina
1952 Helsinki	Norvel Lee; United States	Antonio Pacenza; Argentina	Anatoly Perov; Soviet Union; Harry Siljander; Finland
1956 Melbourne	Jim Boyd; United States	Gheorghe Negrea; Romania	Carlos Lucas; Chile; Romualdas Murauskas; Soviet Union
1960 Rome	Cassius Clay; United States	Zbigniew Pietrzykowski; Poland	Anthony Madigan; Australia; Giulio Saraudi; Italy
1964 Tokyo	Cosimo Pinto; Italy	Aleksei Kiselyov; Soviet Union	Alexander Nikolov; Bulgaria; Zbigniew Pietrzykowski; Poland
1968 Mexico City	Danas Pozniakas; Soviet Union	Ion Monea; Romania	Stanisław Dragan; Poland; Georgi Stankov; Bulgaria
1972 Munich	Mate Parlov; Yugoslavia	Gilberto Carrillo; Cuba	Janusz Gortat; Poland; Isaac Ikhouria; Nigeria
1976 Montreal	Leon Spinks; United States	Sixto Soria; Cuba	Kostica Dafinoiu; Romania; Janusz Gortat; Poland
1980 Moscow	Slobodan Kačar; Yugoslavia	Paweł Skrzecz; Poland	Herbert Bauch; East Germany; Ricardo Rojas; Cuba
1984 Los Angeles	Anton Josipović; Yugoslavia	Kevin Barry; New Zealand	Evander Holyfield; United States; Mustapha Moussa; Algeria
1988 Seoul	Andrew Maynard; United States	Nurmagomed Shanavazov; Soviet Union	Henryk Petrich; Poland; Damir Škaro; Yugoslavia
1992 Barcelona	Torsten May; Germany	Rostyslav Zaulychnyi; Unified Team	Wojciech Bartnik; Poland; Zoltán Béres; Hungary
1996 Atlanta	Vassiliy Jirov; Kazakhstan	Lee Seung-Bae; South Korea	Antonio Tarver; United States; Thomas Ulrich; Germany
2000 Sydney	Aleksandr Lebziak; Russia	Rudolf Kraj; Czech Republic	Andriy Fedchuk; Ukraine; Sergey Mihaylov; Uzbekistan
2004 Athens	Andre Ward; United States	Magomed Aripgadjiev; Belarus	Utkirbek Haydarov; Uzbekistan; Ahmed Ismail; Egypt
2008 Beijing	Zhang Xiaoping; China	Kenneth Egan; Ireland	Tony Jeffries; Great Britain; Yerkebulan Shynaliyev; Kazakhstan
2012 London	Egor Mekhontsev; Russia	Adilbek Niyazymbetov; Kazakhstan	Yamaguchi Falcão; Brazil; Oleksandr Hvozdyk; Ukraine
2016 Rio de Janeiro	Julio César La Cruz; Cuba	Adilbek Niyazymbetov; Kazakhstan	Mathieu Bauderlique; France; Joshua Buatsi; Great Britain
2020 Tokyo	Arlen López; Cuba	Benjamin Whittaker; Great Britain	Imam Khataev; ROC; Loren Alfonso; Azerbaijan

== Multiple medalists ==
Boxers who have won 3 or more Olympic medals. Western athletes usually participate in a single Olympic tournament and then turn pro, while boxers from Cuba and other countries with state support of the sport might compete in several Olympics, therefore having a clear advantage in terms of age and experience. Therefore, there are no representatives of the United States, the most medaled boxing nation, on the list.

As of the 2024 Summer Olympics

#	Boxer	Country	Gold	Silver	Bronze	Total
1	Félix Savón	Cuba	3	0	0	3
1	Teófilo Stevenson	Cuba	3	0	0	3
1	László Papp	Hungary	3	0	0	3
4	Arlen Lopez	Cuba	2	0	1	3
4	Zou Shiming	China	2	0	1	3
4	Roniel Iglesias	Cuba	2	0	1	3
4	Oleg Saitov	Russia	2	0	1	3
4	Boris Lagutin	Soviet Union	2	0	1	3
9	Roberto Cammarelle	Italy	1	1	1	3
9	Li Qian	China	1	1	1	3
11	Zbigniew Pietrzykowski	Poland	0	1	2	3
12	Arnold Vanderlyde	Netherlands	0	0	3	3
13	Vasiliy Lomachenko	Ukraine	2	0	0	2
