= List of stripped Olympic medals =

The following is a list of stripped Olympic medals. The International Olympic Committee (IOC) is the governing body of the Olympic Games, and as such, can rule athletes to have violated rules and regulations of the Games, for which athletes' Olympic medals can be stripped (i.e., rescinded) from them. Additionally, the Court of Arbitration for Sport (CAS) has arbitral jurisdiction over all matters related to the Olympic Games and thus also has the power to strip or return medals. Stripped medals must be returned to the IOC by the offending athlete or team, and may only be reinstated by the IOC or CAS.

The vast majority (over 90 percent) of stripped medals are due to doping infractions. Doping infractions are often discovered well after the fact, and can result in the stripping of medals even many years after their award. On rare occasions, medals are stripped for other reasons, such as ceremony protests, tampering, or other rule violation.

== Record ==
From November 1905 to June 2026, a total of 167 medals have been stripped, with all but nine medals being reallocated (i.e., redistributed) after being stripped. The vast majority of these have occurred since 2000 due to improved drug testing methods, with only 20 stripped medals coming from pre-2000 editions of the Olympic Games.

In the case of team events, the rule was revised in March 2003 so that the IOC can strip medals from a team based on infractions by a single team member. In the table below, for stripped team medals, the athlete(s) in violation are shown in parentheses. The international governing body of each Olympic sport can also strip athletes of medals for infractions of the rules of the sport, though decisions ultimately must be ratified by the IOC.

The majority of medals have been stripped in athletics (57, including 22 gold medals) and weightlifting (52, including 15 gold medals). The country with the most stripped medals is Russia–including Russian associated teams OAR (2018) and ROC (2020–2022)–with 52, more than four times the number of the next highest, and 31% of the total. The Post-Soviet states account for 60% of the overall total.

Though no athletes were caught doping at the 1980 Summer Olympics, it has been claimed that athletes had begun using testosterone and other drugs for which tests had not yet been developed. A 1989 report by a committee of the Australian Senate claimed that "there is hardly a medal winner at the Moscow Games, certainly not a gold medal winner [...] who is not on one sort of drug or another: usually several kinds. The Moscow Games might well have been called the Chemists' Games".

A member of the IOC Medical Commission, Manfred Donike, privately ran additional tests with a new technique for identifying abnormal levels of testosterone by measuring its ratio to epitestosterone in urine. Twenty percent of the specimens he tested, including those from sixteen gold medalists, would have resulted in disciplinary proceedings had the tests been official. The results of Donike's unofficial tests later convinced the IOC to add his new technique to their testing protocols. The first documented case of "blood doping" occurred at the 1980 Summer Olympics as a runner was transfused with two pints of blood before winning medals in the 5000 m and 10,000 m.

Among particular Olympic Games, the 2008 Summer Olympics has the most stripped medals, at 50. Among Winter Olympics, the 2002 Winter Olympics has the most medals stripped with 13, three quarters of the Winter Olympics total.

All but twelve of the stripped medals involve infractions stemming from doping and drug testing; the exceptions are listed below:

- Jack Egan won two medals in boxing at the 1904 Summer Olympics, a silver medal in the lightweight category losing to Harry Spanjer in the final and a tied bronze medal in the welterweight category against fellow American boxer, Joseph Lydon. By the rules of the AAU it was illegal to fight under an assumed name. (Egan's actual name was Frank Joseph Floyd.) In November 1905 the AAU disqualified Egan from all AAU competitions and he had to return all his prizes including his two Olympics medals.
- Jim Thorpe was stripped of his two gold medals by the IOC in 1913, after the IOC learned that Thorpe had taken expense money for playing baseball before the 1912 Games, violating Olympic amateurism rules that had been in place at the time. In 1982, 29 years after his death, the IOC was convinced that the disqualification had been improper, as no protest against Thorpe's eligibility had been brought within the required 30 days, and reinstated Thorpe's medals, with replicas presented to his children.
- The Swedish dressage team, which had originally won gold at the 1948 Games, was subsequently disqualified on April 27, 1949 by the Fédération Équestre Internationale (FEI) and with the approval of the IOC. Gehnäll Persson had been promoted to lieutenant three weeks before the competition. Just two and a half weeks after the competition, the Swedish army demoted him back to sergeant. According to the regulations at the time, only officers and “gentlemen riders” were eligible to take part, but not non-commissioned officers. Since Persson had only been promoted for the period surrounding the games, this was considered a violation of the rules. The incident led to the FEI modernizing its entry conditions, which were perceived as outdated.
- Marika Kilius and Hans-Jürgen Bäumler were stripped of their 1964 silver medal in figure skating for similar reasons to Thorpe, but had them reinstated in 1987.
- Ingemar Johansson was disqualified from the gold medal fight in the 1952 heavyweight boxing competition after the referee deemed that he was "failing to show fight" to win the three-round match, and was subsequently deemed to have forfeited the minimum silver medal he would have won. Johansson said that he did not throw any punches at his opponent in the first two rounds to tire him out before releasing a barrage of punches in the third. He was eventually presented with his silver medal in 1982.
- Ibragim Samadov of the 1992 Unified Team was stripped of his bronze medal after he "hurled his bronze medal to the floor" and "stormed off the stage during the awards ceremony."
- Ara Abrahamian of Sweden was stripped of his bronze medal in 2008 for similar reasons to Samadov.
- In 2010, China was stripped of a team gymnastics bronze medal from 2000 after Dong Fangxiao was found to have been underage at the time of the competition.
- In 2022, the women's ski cross event results were revised nine days after the event and a week after the Games had ended, following an appeal by Fanny Smith, who was penalized for causing contact during the final. She replaced Daniela Maier for bronze upon the FIS appeal panel decision. The two athletes and their sporting federations later agreed to share third place and Maier's bronze medal was restored.
- In 2024, Jordan Chiles was initially awarded bronze in the floor exercise final. Although Chiles' initial score was not high enough to earn a medal, officials adjusted her score following an appeal from Chiles' coach after determining that Chiles' difficulty score should be raised by one-tenth. Chiles' revised score placed her in third place, earning a bronze medal. The Romanian Gymnastics Federation appealed this decision to the Court of Arbitration for Sport, which ruled that Chiles' coach had made the appeal not within the allowed minute (specifically, four seconds late). In response to the ruling, the International Gymnastics Federation reinstated Chiles' initial score, putting her in fifth place, and reinstated Romanian gymnast Ana Bărbosu to third place. On August 11, the International Olympic Committee announced that the bronze medal in the floor exercise would go to Bărbosu, thus leaving Chiles without an individual Olympic medal.

Some athletes have had medals taken away from them for different methods of cheating before physically getting on to the medal podium, such as American marathon runner Frederick Lorz at the 1904 Olympics and Swedish horse rider Bertil Sandström at the 1932 Olympics. These athletes are not included in the list as they were disqualified before physically receiving their medals, and in any case were never guaranteed to win them going in to the final round of competition.

Russian wrestler Besik Kudukhov failed a drug test in 2016 from a sample taken when he competed in the 60 kg freestyle wrestling event at the 2012 Olympics. However, as Kudukhov had died in a car accident three years earlier, his medal was retained.

In the case of Rick DeMont, the United States Olympic Committee (USOC) recognized his gold medal performance in the 1972 Summer Olympics in 2001, but only the IOC has the power to restore his medal, and it has, as of 2024, refused to do so. DeMont originally won the gold medal in the 400m freestyle swimming, but the International Olympic Committee (IOC) stripped him of his gold medal after his post-race urinalysis tested positive for traces of the banned substance ephedrine contained in his prescription asthma medication, Marax. The positive test also deprived him of a chance at multiple medals, as he was not permitted to swim in any other events at the 1972 Olympics, including the 1,500-meter freestyle for which he was the then-current world record-holder. Before the Olympics, DeMont had properly declared his asthma medications on his medical disclosure forms, but the U.S. Olympic Committee (USOC) had not cleared them with the IOC's medical committee.

== Stripped medals ==
- This is the list of Olympic medals stripped by the IOC, the governing body of the Olympics.
- Stripped team medals are counted once each, regardless of the size of the team stripped or how many team members were disqualified, although a stripped team medal usually entails the return of multiple physical medals, one per team member.
- Unless otherwise indicated by a footnote, a stripped team medal means the entire team in question was disqualified entirely from the event, even if for infractions by a subset of its members.
- (X) medal declared vacant (10 medals) – Reasons include prospective medal recipients committing doping offenses outside the Games (5) or not having been tested for drugs at the competition (2); unsportsmanlike behavior that did not occur in the context of competition (2); and judo's structure of two bronze medalists per event (1).
- (Y) medal yet to be reallocated (5 medals)
- (Z) not due to doping (12 medals)

Olympics	Athlete(s)	Country	Medal	Event	Ref.
1904 Summer Olympics	Jack Egan	United States	2nd place, silver medalist(s)	Boxing, Men's Lightweight (Z)	
1904 Summer Olympics	Jack Egan	United States	3rd place, bronze medalist(s)	Boxing, Men's Welterweight (Z)	
1948 Summer Olympics	Equestrian team (Gehnäll Persson)	Sweden	1st place, gold medalist(s)	Equestrian, Team dressage (Z)	
1968 Summer Olympics	Modern Pentathlon team (Hans-Gunnar Liljenwall)	Sweden	3rd place, bronze medalist(s)	Modern pentathlon, Team	
1972 Summer Olympics	Bakhvain Buyadaa	Mongolia	2nd place, silver medalist(s)	Judo, Men's 63 kg (X)	
1972 Summer Olympics	Cycling team (Aad van den Hoek)	Netherlands	3rd place, bronze medalist(s)	Cycling, Men's team time trial (X)	
1972 Summer Olympics	Jaime Huélamo	Spain	3rd place, bronze medalist(s)	Cycling, Men's individual road race (X)	
1972 Summer Olympics	Rick DeMont	United States	1st place, gold medalist(s)	Swimming, Men's 400 m freestyle	
1976 Winter Olympics	Galina Kulakova	Soviet Union	3rd place, bronze medalist(s)	Cross-Country Skiing, Women's 5 km	
1976 Summer Olympics	Valentin Khristov	Bulgaria	1st place, gold medalist(s)	Weightlifting, Men's 110 kg	
1976 Summer Olympics	Blagoy Blagoev	Bulgaria	2nd place, silver medalist(s)	Weightlifting, Men's 82.5 kg	
1976 Summer Olympics	Zbigniew Kaczmarek	Poland	1st place, gold medalist(s)	Weightlifting, Men's 67.5 kg	
1984 Summer Olympics	Martti Vainio	Finland	2nd place, silver medalist(s)	Athletics, Men's 10,000 m	
1984 Summer Olympics	Tomas Johansson	Sweden	2nd place, silver medalist(s)	Wrestling, Men's Greco-Roman +100 kg	
1988 Summer Olympics	Mitko Grablev	Bulgaria	1st place, gold medalist(s)	Weightlifting, Men's 56 kg	
1988 Summer Olympics	Angel Guenchev	Bulgaria	1st place, gold medalist(s)	Weightlifting, Men's 67.5 kg	
1988 Summer Olympics	Ben Johnson	Canada	1st place, gold medalist(s)	Athletics, Men's 100 m	
1988 Summer Olympics	Andor Szanyi	Hungary	2nd place, silver medalist(s)	Weightlifting, Men's 100 kg	
1988 Summer Olympics	Kerrith Brown	Great Britain	3rd place, bronze medalist(s)	Judo, Men's 71 kg	
1992 Summer Olympics	Ibragim Samadov	Unified Team	3rd place, bronze medalist(s)	Weightlifting, Men's 82.5 kg (X, Z)	
2000 Summer Olympics	Ashot Danielyan	Armenia	3rd place, bronze medalist(s)	Weightlifting, Men's +105 kg	
2000 Summer Olympics	Izabela Dragneva	Bulgaria	1st place, gold medalist(s)	Weightlifting, Women's 48 kg	
2000 Summer Olympics	Ivan Ivanov	Bulgaria	2nd place, silver medalist(s)	Weightlifting, Men's 56 kg	
2000 Summer Olympics	Sevdalin Minchev	Bulgaria	3rd place, bronze medalist(s)	Weightlifting, Men's 62 kg	
2000 Summer Olympics	Gymnastics team (Dong Fangxiao)	China	3rd place, bronze medalist(s)	Gymnastics, Women's artistic team all-around (Z)	
2000 Summer Olympics	Alexander Leipold	Germany	1st place, gold medalist(s)	Wrestling, Men's freestyle 76 kg	
2000 Summer Olympics	Andreea Răducan	Romania	1st place, gold medalist(s)	Gymnastics, Women's artistic individual all-around	
2000 Summer Olympics	Marion Jones	United States	1st place, gold medalist(s)	Athletics, Women's 100 m (X)	
2000 Summer Olympics	Marion Jones	United States	1st place, gold medalist(s)	Athletics, Women's 200 m	
2000 Summer Olympics	Marion Jones	United States	1st place, gold medalist(s)	Athletics, Women's 4 × 400 metres relay	
2000 Summer Olympics	Marion Jones	United States	3rd place, bronze medalist(s)	Athletics, Women's 4 × 100 metres relay	
2000 Summer Olympics	Marion Jones	United States	3rd place, bronze medalist(s)	Athletics, Women's long jump	
2000 Summer Olympics	Relay team (Antonio Pettigrew, Jerome Young)	United States	1st place, gold medalist(s)	Athletics, Men's 4 × 400 m relay	
2000 Summer Olympics	Lance Armstrong	United States	3rd place, bronze medalist(s)	Cycling, Men's road time trial (X)	
2002 Winter Olympics	Alain Baxter	Great Britain	3rd place, bronze medalist(s)	Alpine Skiing, Men's slalom	
2002 Winter Olympics	Olga Danilova	Russia	1st place, gold medalist(s)	Cross-Country Skiing, Women's 5 km + 5 km combined pursuit	
2002 Winter Olympics	Olga Danilova	Russia	2nd place, silver medalist(s)	Cross-Country Skiing, Women's 10 km classical	
2002 Winter Olympics	Larisa Lazutina	Russia	1st place, gold medalist(s)	Cross-Country Skiing, Women's 30 km classical	
2002 Winter Olympics	Larisa Lazutina	Russia	2nd place, silver medalist(s)	Cross-Country Skiing, Women's 15 km freestyle mass start	
2002 Winter Olympics	Larisa Lazutina	Russia	2nd place, silver medalist(s)	Cross-Country Skiing, Women's 5 km + 5 km combined pursuit	
2002 Winter Olympics	Johann Mühlegg	Spain	1st place, gold medalist(s)	Cross-Country Skiing, Men's 50 km classical	
2002 Winter Olympics	Johann Mühlegg	Spain	1st place, gold medalist(s)	Cross-Country Skiing, Men's 30 km freestyle	
2002 Winter Olympics	Johann Mühlegg	Spain	1st place, gold medalist(s)	Cross-Country Skiing, Men's 10 km + 10 km combined pursuit	
2004 Summer Olympics	Ivan Tsikhan	Belarus	2nd place, silver medalist(s)	Athletics, Men's hammer throw (X)–2 medals not awarded	
2004 Summer Olympics	Iryna Yatchenko	Belarus	3rd place, bronze medalist(s)	Athletics, Women's discus throw	
2004 Summer Olympics	Equestrian team (Note: The German team was not disqualified, but with Beerbaum's score excluded, it dropped from gold medalist to bronze medalist.) (Goldfever horse; Ludger Beerbaum rider)	Germany	1st place, gold medalist(s)	Equestrian, Team show jumping	
2004 Summer Olympics	Leonidas Sabanis	Greece	3rd place, bronze medalist(s)	Weightlifting, Men's 62 kg	
2004 Summer Olympics	Adrián Annus	Hungary	1st place, gold medalist(s)	Athletics, Men's hammer throw	
2004 Summer Olympics	Róbert Fazekas	Hungary	1st place, gold medalist(s)	Athletics, Men's discus throw	
2004 Summer Olympics	Ferenc Gyurkovics	Hungary	2nd place, silver medalist(s)	Weightlifting, Men's 105 kg	
2004 Summer Olympics	Waterford Crystal (horse; Cian O'Connor rider)	Ireland	1st place, gold medalist(s)	Equestrian, Individual show jumping	
2004 Summer Olympics	Irina Korzhanenko	Russia	1st place, gold medalist(s)	Athletics, Women's shot put	
2004 Summer Olympics	Svetlana Krivelyova	Russia	3rd place, bronze medalist(s)	Athletics, Women's shot put (X)	
2004 Summer Olympics	Oleg Perepetchenov	Russia	3rd place, bronze medalist(s)	Weightlifting, Men's 77 kg	
2004 Summer Olympics	Yuriy Bilonoh	Ukraine	1st place, gold medalist(s)	Athletics, Men's shot put	
2004 Summer Olympics	Rowing team (Olena Olefirenko)	Ukraine	3rd place, bronze medalist(s)	Rowing, Women's quadruple sculls	
2004 Summer Olympics	Tyler Hamilton	United States	1st place, gold medalist(s)	Cycling, Men's road time trial	
2006 Winter Olympics	Olga Pyleva	Russia	2nd place, silver medalist(s)	Biathlon, Women's individual	
2008 Summer Olympics	Tigran Gevorg Martirosyan	Armenia	3rd place, bronze medalist(s)	Weightlifting, Men's 69 kg	
2008 Summer Olympics	Vitaliy Rahimov	Azerbaijan	2nd place, silver medalist(s)	Wrestling, Men's Greco-Roman 60 kg	
2008 Summer Olympics	Rashid Ramzi	Bahrain	1st place, gold medalist(s)	Athletics, Men's 1500 m	
2008 Summer Olympics	Aksana Miankova	Belarus	1st place, gold medalist(s)	Athletics, Women's hammer throw	
2008 Summer Olympics	Natallia Mikhnevich	Belarus	2nd place, silver medalist(s)	Athletics, Women's shot put	
2008 Summer Olympics	Andrei Rybakou	Belarus	2nd place, silver medalist(s)	Weightlifting, Men's 85 kg	
2008 Summer Olympics	Andrei Mikhnevich	Belarus	3rd place, bronze medalist(s)	Athletics, Men's shot put	
2008 Summer Olympics	Nastassia Novikava	Belarus	3rd place, bronze medalist(s)	Weightlifting, Women's 53 kg	
2008 Summer Olympics	Nadzeya Ostapchuk	Belarus	3rd place, bronze medalist(s)	Athletics, Women's shot put	
2008 Summer Olympics	Liu Chunhong	China	1st place, gold medalist(s)	Weightlifting, Women's 69 kg	
2008 Summer Olympics	Cao Lei	China	1st place, gold medalist(s)	Weightlifting, Women's 75 kg	
2008 Summer Olympics	Chen Xiexia	China	1st place, gold medalist(s)	Weightlifting, Women's 48 kg	
2008 Summer Olympics	Yarelys Barrios	Cuba	2nd place, silver medalist(s)	Athletics, Women's discus throw	
2008 Summer Olympics	Hrysopiyi Devetzi	Greece	3rd place, bronze medalist(s)	Athletics, Women's triple jump	
2008 Summer Olympics	Davide Rebellin	Italy	2nd place, silver medalist(s)	Cycling, Men's road race	
2008 Summer Olympics	Relay team (Nesta Carter)	Jamaica	1st place, gold medalist(s)	Athletics, Men's 4 × 100 m relay	
2008 Summer Olympics	Ilya Ilyin	Kazakhstan	1st place, gold medalist(s)	Weightlifting, Men's 94 kg	
2008 Summer Olympics	Irina Nekrassova	Kazakhstan	2nd place, silver medalist(s)	Weightlifting, Women's 63 kg	
2008 Summer Olympics	Taimuraz Tigiyev	Kazakhstan	2nd place, silver medalist(s)	Wrestling, Men's freestyle 96 kg	
2008 Summer Olympics	Mariya Grabovetskaya	Kazakhstan	3rd place, bronze medalist(s)	Weightlifting, Women's +75 kg	
2008 Summer Olympics	Asset Mambetov	Kazakhstan	3rd place, bronze medalist(s)	Wrestling, Men's Greco-Roman 96 kg	
2008 Summer Olympics	Kim Jong-su	North Korea	2nd place, silver medalist(s)	Shooting, Men's 50 m air pistol	
2008 Summer Olympics	Kim Jong-su	North Korea	3rd place, bronze medalist(s)	Shooting, Men's 10 m air pistol	
2008 Summer Olympics	Equestrian team (Note: The Norwegian team was not disqualified, but with Hansen's score excluded, it dropped from bronze medalist to tenth.) (Camiro horse; Tony André Hansen rider)	Norway	3rd place, bronze medalist(s)	Equestrian, team show jumping	
2008 Summer Olympics	Relay team (Yuliya Chermoshanskaya)	Russia	1st place, gold medalist(s)	Athletics, Women's 4 × 100 m relay	
2008 Summer Olympics	Maria Abakumova	Russia	2nd place, silver medalist(s)	Athletics, Women's javelin throw	
2008 Summer Olympics	Khasan Baroev	Russia	2nd place, silver medalist(s)	Wrestling, Men's Greco-Roman 120 kg	
2008 Summer Olympics	Tatyana Lebedeva	Russia	2nd place, silver medalist(s)	Athletics, Women's triple jump	
2008 Summer Olympics	Tatyana Lebedeva	Russia	2nd place, silver medalist(s)	Athletics, Women's long jump	
2008 Summer Olympics	Relay team (Anastasiya Kapachinskaya, Tatyana Firova)	Russia	2nd place, silver medalist(s)	Athletics, Women's 4 × 400 m relay	
2008 Summer Olympics	Marina Shainova	Russia	2nd place, silver medalist(s)	Weightlifting, Women's 58 kg	
2008 Summer Olympics	Khadzhimurat Akkaev	Russia	3rd place, bronze medalist(s)	Weightlifting, Men's 94 kg	
2008 Summer Olympics	Anna Chicherova	Russia	3rd place, bronze medalist(s)	Athletics, Women's high jump	
2008 Summer Olympics	Nadezhda Evstyukhina	Russia	3rd place, bronze medalist(s)	Weightlifting, Women's 75 kg	
2008 Summer Olympics	Dmitry Lapikov	Russia	3rd place, bronze medalist(s)	Weightlifting, Men's 105 kg	
2008 Summer Olympics	Tatyana Chernova	Russia	3rd place, bronze medalist(s)	Athletics, Women's heptathlon	
2008 Summer Olympics	Relay team (Denis Alexeev)	Russia	3rd place, bronze medalist(s)	Athletics, Men's 4 × 400 m relay	
2008 Summer Olympics	Yekaterina Volkova	Russia	3rd place, bronze medalist(s)	Athletics, Women's 3000 m steeplechase	
2008 Summer Olympics	Ara Abrahamian	Sweden	3rd place, bronze medalist(s)	Wrestling, Men's Greco-Roman 84 kg (X, Z)	
2008 Summer Olympics	Elvan Abeylegesse	Turkey	2nd place, silver medalist(s)	Athletics, Women's 5000 metres	
2008 Summer Olympics	Elvan Abeylegesse	Turkey	2nd place, silver medalist(s)	Athletics, Women's 10000 metres	
2008 Summer Olympics	Sibel Özkan	Turkey	2nd place, silver medalist(s)	Weightlifting, Women's 48 kg	
2008 Summer Olympics	Lyudmyla Blonska	Ukraine	2nd place, silver medalist(s)	Athletics, Women's heptathlon	
2008 Summer Olympics	Vasyl Fedoryshyn	Ukraine	2nd place, silver medalist(s)	Wrestling, Men's freestyle 60 kg	
2008 Summer Olympics	Olha Korobka	Ukraine	2nd place, silver medalist(s)	Weightlifting, Women's +75 kg	
2008 Summer Olympics	Nataliya Davydova	Ukraine	3rd place, bronze medalist(s)	Weightlifting, Women's 69 kg	
2008 Summer Olympics	Victoria Tereshchuk	Ukraine	3rd place, bronze medalist(s)	Modern pentathlon, Women's modern pentathlon	
2008 Summer Olympics	Denys Yurchenko	Ukraine	3rd place, bronze medalist(s)	Athletics, Men's pole vault	
2008 Summer Olympics	Artur Taymazov	Uzbekistan	1st place, gold medalist(s)	Wrestling, Men's freestyle 120 kg	
2008 Summer Olympics	Soslan Tigiev	Uzbekistan	2nd place, silver medalist(s)	Wrestling, Men's freestyle 74 kg	
2010 Winter Olympics	Evgeny Ustyugov	Russia	1st place, gold medalist(s)	Biathlon, Men's mass start	
2010 Winter Olympics	Relay team (Evgeny Ustyugov)	Russia	3rd place, bronze medalist(s)	Biathlon, Men's relay	
2012 Summer Olympics	Hripsime Khurshudyan	Armenia	3rd place, bronze medalist(s)	Weightlifting, Women's +75 kg	
2012 Summer Olympics	Valentin Hristov	Azerbaijan	3rd place, bronze medalist(s)	Weightlifting, Men's 56 kg	
2012 Summer Olympics	Nadzeya Ostapchuk	Belarus	1st place, gold medalist(s)	Athletics, Women's shot put	
2012 Summer Olympics	Iryna Kulesha	Belarus	3rd place, bronze medalist(s)	Weightlifting, Women's 75 kg	
2012 Summer Olympics	Maryna Shkermankova	Belarus	3rd place, bronze medalist(s)	Weightlifting, Women's 69 kg	
2012 Summer Olympics	Davit Modzmanashvili	Georgia	2nd place, silver medalist(s)	Wrestling, Men's freestyle 120 kg	
2012 Summer Olympics	Zulfiya Chinshanlo	Kazakhstan	1st place, gold medalist(s)	Weightlifting, Women's 53 kg	
2012 Summer Olympics	Ilya Ilyin	Kazakhstan	1st place, gold medalist(s)	Weightlifting, Men's 94 kg	
2012 Summer Olympics	Maiya Maneza	Kazakhstan	1st place, gold medalist(s)	Weightlifting, Women's 63 kg	
2012 Summer Olympics	Svetlana Podobedova	Kazakhstan	1st place, gold medalist(s)	Weightlifting, Women's 75 kg	
2012 Summer Olympics	Jevgenij Shuklin	Lithuania	2nd place, silver medalist(s)	Canoeing, Men's C-1 200 m	
2012 Summer Olympics	Anatolie Cîrîcu	Moldova	3rd place, bronze medalist(s)	Weightlifting, Men's 94 kg	
2012 Summer Olympics	Cristina Iovu	Moldova	3rd place, bronze medalist(s)	Weightlifting, Women's 53 kg	
2012 Summer Olympics	Răzvan Martin	Romania	3rd place, bronze medalist(s)	Weightlifting, Men's 69 kg	
2012 Summer Olympics	Roxana Cocoș	Romania	2nd place, silver medalist(s)	Weightlifting, Women's 69 kg	
2012 Summer Olympics	Natalya Antyukh	Russia	1st place, gold medalist(s)	Athletics, Women's 400 m hurdles	
2012 Summer Olympics	Sergey Kirdyapkin	Russia	1st place, gold medalist(s)	Athletics, Men's 50 km walk	
2012 Summer Olympics	Elena Lashmanova	Russia	1st place, gold medalist(s)	Athletics, Women's 20 km walk	
2012 Summer Olympics	Ivan Ukhov	Russia	1st place, gold medalist(s)	Athletics, Men's high jump	
2012 Summer Olympics	Tatyana Lysenko	Russia	1st place, gold medalist(s)	Athletics, Women's hammer throw	
2012 Summer Olympics	Mariya Savinova	Russia	1st place, gold medalist(s)	Athletics, Women's 800 m	
2012 Summer Olympics	Yuliya Zaripova	Russia	1st place, gold medalist(s)	Athletics, Women's 3000 m steeplechase	
2012 Summer Olympics	Apti Aukhadov	Russia	2nd place, silver medalist(s)	Weightlifting, Men's 85 kg	
2012 Summer Olympics	Aleksandr Ivanov	Russia	2nd place, silver medalist(s)	Weightlifting, Men's 94 kg	
2012 Summer Olympics	Olga Kaniskina	Russia	2nd place, silver medalist(s)	Athletics, Women's 20 km walk	
2012 Summer Olympics	Yevgeniya Kolodko	Russia	2nd place, silver medalist(s)	Athletics, Women's shot put	
2012 Summer Olympics	Darya Pishchalnikova	Russia	2nd place, silver medalist(s)	Athletics, Women's discus throw	
2012 Summer Olympics	Tatyana Tomashova	Russia	2nd place, silver medalist(s)	Athletics, Women's 1500 m	
2012 Summer Olympics	Relay team (Antonina Krivoshapka, Yulia Gushchina, Tatyana Firova, Natalya Antyukh)	Russia	2nd place, silver medalist(s)	Athletics, Women's 4 × 400 m relay	
2012 Summer Olympics	Svetlana Tsarukaeva	Russia	2nd place, silver medalist(s)	Weightlifting, Women's 63 kg	
2012 Summer Olympics	Natalya Zabolotnaya	Russia	2nd place, silver medalist(s)	Weightlifting, Women's 75 kg	
2012 Summer Olympics	Tatyana Chernova	Russia	3rd place, bronze medalist(s)	Athletics, Women's heptathlon	
2012 Summer Olympics	Ekaterina Poistogova	Russia	3rd place, bronze medalist(s)	Athletics, Women's 800 m	
2012 Summer Olympics	Svetlana Shkolina	Russia	3rd place, bronze medalist(s)	Athletics, Women's high jump	
2012 Summer Olympics	Ruslan Albegov	Russia	3rd place, bronze medalist(s)	Weightlifting, Men's +105 kg	
2012 Summer Olympics	Asli Cakir Alptekin	Turkey	1st place, gold medalist(s)	Athletics, Women's 1500 m	
2012 Summer Olympics	Gamze Bulut	Turkey	2nd place, silver medalist(s)	Athletics, Women's 1500 m	
2012 Summer Olympics	Relay team (Tyson Gay)	United States	2nd place, silver medalist(s)	Athletics, Men's 4 × 100 m relay	
2012 Summer Olympics	Oleksiy Torokhtiy	Ukraine	1st place, gold medalist(s)	Weightlifting, Men's 105 kg	
2012 Summer Olympics	Oleksandr Pyatnytsya	Ukraine	2nd place, silver medalist(s)	Athletics, Men's javelin throw	
2012 Summer Olympics	Yuliya Kalina	Ukraine	3rd place, bronze medalist(s)	Weightlifting, Women's 58 kg	
2012 Summer Olympics	Artur Taymazov	Uzbekistan	1st place, gold medalist(s)	Wrestling, Men's freestyle 120 kg	
2012 Summer Olympics	Soslan Tigiev	Uzbekistan	3rd place, bronze medalist(s)	Wrestling, Men's freestyle 74 kg	
2014 Winter Olympics	Two-man (Alexandr Zubkov, Alexey Voyevoda)	Russia	1st place, gold medalist(s)	Bobsleigh, Two-man	
2014 Winter Olympics	Four-man (Alexandr Zubkov, Alexey Voyevoda)	Russia	1st place, gold medalist(s)	Bobsleigh, Four-man	
2014 Winter Olympics	Relay team (Evgeny Ustyugov)	Russia	1st place, gold medalist(s)	Biathlon, Men's relay	
2014 Winter Olympics	Relay team (Olga Zaitseva)	Russia	2nd place, silver medalist(s)	Biathlon, Women's relay	
2016 Summer Olympics	Nijat Rahimov	Kazakhstan	1st place, gold medalist(s)	Weightlifting, Men's 77 kg (Y)–3 medals to be allocated	
2016 Summer Olympics	Izzat Artykov	Kyrgyzstan	3rd place, bronze medalist(s)	Weightlifting, Men's 69 kg	
2016 Summer Olympics	Serghei Tarnovschi	Moldova	3rd place, bronze medalist(s)	Canoeing, Men's C-1 1000 m	
2016 Summer Olympics	Gabriel Sîncrăian	Romania	3rd place, bronze medalist(s)	Weightlifting, Men's 85 kg	
2016 Summer Olympics	Mikhail Aloyan	Russia	2nd place, silver medalist(s)	Boxing, Men's flyweight	
2018 Winter Olympics	Curling team (Aleksandr Krushelnitckii)	Olympic Athletes from Russia	3rd place, bronze medalist(s)	Curling, Mixed doubles	
2020 Summer Olympics	Relay team (Chijindu Ujah)	Great Britain	2nd place, silver medalist(s)	Athletics, Men's 4 x 100 m relay	
2020 Summer Olympics	Zurabi Datunashvili	Serbia	3rd place, bronze medalist(s)	Wrestling, Men's Greco-Roman 87 kg	
2022 Winter Olympics	Figure skating team (Kamila Valieva) (Note: The CAS ruling explicitly disqualified Valieva and stripped Valieva's medal. The rest of the ROC team was not disqualified, but with Valieva's scores deleted, they were demoted from gold to bronze, and because the ROC itself remains suspended, even the bronze medals have not been awarded.)	ROC	1st place, gold medalist(s)	Figure skating, team event	
2024 Summer Olympics	Jordan Chiles	United States	3rd place, bronze medalist(s)	Gymnastics, Women's floor (Z)	

== List of Olympic medals stripped and later returned ==
Here is the list of Olympic medals that were stripped by the IOC and later returned by the IOC.

Olympics	Athlete	Country	Medal	Event	Ref
1912 Summer Olympics	Jim Thorpe	United States	1st place, gold medalist(s)	Athletics, Men's pentathlon (Z)	
1912 Summer Olympics	Jim Thorpe	United States	1st place, gold medalist(s)	Athletics, Men's decathlon (Z)	
1952 Summer Olympics	Ingemar Johansson	Sweden	2nd place, silver medalist(s)	Boxing, Men's heavyweight (Z)	
1964 Winter Olympics	Marika Kilius, Hans-Jürgen Bäumler	Germany	2nd place, silver medalist(s)	Figure skating, Pairs (Z)	
1998 Winter Olympics	Ross Rebagliati	Canada	1st place, gold medalist(s)	Snowboarding, Men's giant slalom	
2000 Summer Olympics	Relay team (except Marion Jones)	United States	1st place, gold medalist(s)	Athletics, Women's 4 × 400 m relay	
2000 Summer Olympics	Relay team (except Marion Jones)	United States	3rd place, bronze medalist(s)	Athletics, Women's 4 × 100 m relay	
2004 Summer Olympics	María Luisa Calle	Colombia	3rd place, bronze medalist(s)	Cycling, Women's points race	
2008 Summer Olympics	Vadim Devyatovskiy	Belarus	2nd place, silver medalist(s)	Athletics, Men's hammer throw	
2008 Summer Olympics	Ivan Tsikhan	Belarus	3rd place, bronze medalist(s)	Athletics, Men's hammer throw	
2014 Winter Olympics	Alexander Legkov	Russia	1st place, gold medalist(s)	Cross-Country Skiing, Men's 50 km freestyle	
2014 Winter Olympics	Aleksandr Tretyakov	Russia	1st place, gold medalist(s)	Skeleton, Men's individual	
2014 Winter Olympics	Relay team (Alexander Legkov, Maxim Vylegzhanin, Alexander Bessmertnykh)	Russia	2nd place, silver medalist(s)	Cross-Country Skiing, Men's 4 x 10 km relay	
2014 Winter Olympics	Maksim Vylegzhanin	Russia	2nd place, silver medalist(s)	Cross-Country Skiing, Men's 50 km freestyle	
2014 Winter Olympics	Relay team (Maxim Vylegzhanin, Nikita Kryukov)	Russia	2nd place, silver medalist(s)	Cross-Country Skiing, Men's team sprint	
2014 Winter Olympics	Olga Vilukhina	Russia	2nd place, silver medalist(s)	Biathlon, Women's sprint	
2014 Winter Olympics	Olga Fatkulina	Russia	2nd place, silver medalist(s)	Speed Skating, Women's 500 m	
2014 Winter Olympics	Albert Demchenko	Russia	2nd place, silver medalist(s)	Luge, Men's singles	
2014 Winter Olympics	Relay team (Albert Demchenko, Tatiana Ivanova)	Russia	2nd place, silver medalist(s)	Luge, Team relay	
2014 Winter Olympics	Elena Nikitina	Russia	3rd place, bronze medalist(s)	Skeleton, Women's individual	
2014 Winter Olympics	Nicklas Bäckström	Sweden	2nd place, silver medalist(s)	Ice hockey, Men's tournament	
2022 Winter Olympics	Daniela Maier (Note: During the women's ski cross final, Fanny Smith (SUI) was penalised for interference that automatically demoted her in the final, and filed an appeal. The FIS announced on 26 February 2022 the close proximity of the incident in question with multiple participants resulted in the penalty being rescinded and demoted to an official warning, with results revised. On 13 December 2022, after further consultation with both affected skiers and their federations, the result was changed by the Court of Arbitration for Sport where both competitors in question were awarded duplicate bronze medals.)	Germany	3rd place, bronze medalist(s)	Freestyle skiing, Women's ski cross (Z)	

== Stripped, returned, then stripped again ==
Gold medals for the 2000 Olympic men's 4 × 400 metres relay were awarded to the U.S. squad of Jerome Young, Michael Johnson, Antonio Pettigrew, Angelo Taylor, Alvin Harrison and Calvin Harrison. In 2004, after Young (who ran in the heats) was retroactively banned from 1999 to 2001, all six were stripped of their medals.

In 2005, the Court of Arbitration for Sport restored the medals of the remaining five due to the fact that, according to the rules of the time, a team should not be disqualified because of a doping offense of an athlete who did not compete in the finals, but in 2008, Pettigrew admitted to the use of doping from 1997 to 2003, meaning that the team was disqualified.

== Medals stripped by games ==
- Highest record marked in bold.

Stripped medals by games
Games	1st place, gold medalist(s)	2nd place, silver medalist(s)	3rd place, bronze medalist(s)	Total
1904 St. Louis	0	1	1	2
1948 London	1	0	0	1
1968 Mexico City	0	0	1	1
1972 Munich	1	1	2	4
1976 Innsbruck	0	0	1	1
1976 Montreal	2	1	0	3
1984 Los Angeles	0	2	0	2
1988 Seoul	3	1	1	5
1992 Barcelona	0	0	1	1
2000 Sydney	7	1	6	14
2002 Salt Lake City	5	3	1	9
2004 Athens	7	2	5	14
2006 Turin	0	1	0	1
2008 Beijing	9	**21**	**20**	**50**
2010 Vancouver	1	0	1	2
2012 London	**15**	15	13	43
2014 Sochi	3	1	0	4
2016 Rio de Janeiro	1	1	3	5
2018 Pyeongchang	0	0	1	1
2020 Tokyo	0	1	1	2
2022 Beijing	1	0	0	1
2024 Paris	0	0	1	1
Total	56	52	59	167

== Medals stripped by country ==
A total of 39 countries/teams have had medals stripped, counting separately from Russia the former Soviet Union, the Unified Team of 1992, Olympic Athletes from Russia team of 2018, and the Russian Olympic Committee team of 2022. In total, 101 (60%) of all medals stripped are from former Soviet states.

Stripped medals by country
**Country**	1st place, gold medalist(s)	2nd place, silver medalist(s)	3rd place, bronze medalist(s)	**Total**
Russia	15	21	14	50
United States	6	2	5	13
Ukraine	2	4	5	11
Belarus	2	3	6	11
Kazakhstan	6	2	2	10
Bulgaria	4	2	1	7
Turkey	1	4	0	5
China	3	0	1	4
Spain	3	0	1	4
Hungary	2	2	0	4
Uzbekistan	2	1	1	4
Romania	1	1	2	4
Sweden	1	1	2	4
Great Britain	0	1	2	3
Armenia	0	0	3	3
Moldova	0	0	3	3
Germany	2	0	0	2
Azerbaijan	0	1	1	2
North Korea	0	1	1	2
Greece	0	0	2	2
Bahrain	1	0	0	1
Canada	1	0	0	1
Ireland	1	0	0	1
Jamaica	1	0	0	1
Poland	1	0	0	1
ROC	1	0	0	1
Cuba	0	1	0	1
Finland	0	1	0	1
Georgia	0	1	0	1
Italy	0	1	0	1
Lithuania	0	1	0	1
Mongolia	0	1	0	1
Kyrgyzstan	0	0	1	1
Netherlands	0	0	1	1
Norway	0	0	1	1
Olympic Athletes from Russia	0	0	1	1
Serbia	0	0	1	1
Soviet Union	0	0	1	1
Unified Team	0	0	1	1
Total	56	52	59	167

== Medals stripped by gender ==
Men have had more medals stripped overall. Men have also had more gold and bronze medals stripped, but women have had more silver medals stripped. However, based on percentages men and women have had medals stripped at similar rates.

Mixed events will be classed in the table below on which gender caused the medal to be stripped. If both genders contribute to the medal being stripped, then it should be added to both tallies. Note that Marion Jones' stripped relay medals are not counted.

Stripped medals by gender
**Gender**	1st place, gold medalist(s)	2nd place, silver medalist(s)	3rd place, bronze medalist(s)	**Total**	**Percentage**
Male	33	25	33	91	54.5%
Female	23	27	26	76	45.5%
Total	56	52	59	167	100%

== Medals stripped by sport ==
A total of 19 different sports have had medals stripped: 13 from the Summer Olympics and 6 from the Winter Olympics. Athletics and weightlifting have had by far the greatest numbers of medals stripped compared to any other sport; consequently, the vast majority of stripped medals are for Summer Olympics sports, with only 17 stripped medals for Winter Olympics sports, of which cross-country skiing has the majority, 9.

Stripped medals by sport
**Sport**	1st place, gold medalist(s)	2nd place, silver medalist(s)	3rd place, bronze medalist(s)	**Total**
Athletics	22	20	15	57
Weightlifting	15	14	23	52
Wrestling	3	7	4	14
Cross-country skiing	5	3	1	9
Biathlon	2	2	1	5
Cycling	1	1	3	5
Equestrian	3	0	1	4
Boxing	0	2	1	3
Bobsleigh	2	0	0	2
Gymnastics	1	0	2	3
Canoeing	0	1	1	2
Judo	0	1	1	2
Shooting	0	1	1	2
Modern pentathlon	0	0	2	2
Figure skating	1	0	0	1
Swimming	1	0	0	1
Alpine skiing	0	0	1	1
Curling	0	0	1	1
Rowing	0	0	1	1
Total	56	52	59	167

== See also ==
- All-time Olympic Games medal table
- Doping at the Olympic Games
- List of doping cases in sport
