= Boxing at the 1904 Summer Olympics – Welterweight =

Men's welterweight boxing at the Games of the III Olympiad
- Venue: Physical Culture Gymnasium (Washington University in St. Louis)
- Dates: September 21, 1904 (semifinals); September 22, 1904 (final)
- Competitors: 4 from 1 nation

Medalists
1st place, gold medalist(s)		Albert Young	United States
2nd place, silver medalist(s)		Harry Spanjer	United States
3rd place, bronze medalist(s)		Joseph Lydon	United States

The welterweight was the third heaviest boxing weight class held as part of the boxing programme at the 1904 Summer Olympics. The competition was held on Wednesday, September 21, 1904 and on Thursday, September 22, 1904. It was the first time the event, like all other boxing events, was held in Olympic competition. Welterweights had to be less than 65.8 kilograms. Four boxers competed.

== Results ==
Semifinals; September 21
1	Albert Young (USA)	W
4	Jack Egan (USA)	L
3	Harry Spanjer (USA)	W
2	Joseph Lydon (USA)	L

Final; September 22
Albert Young (USA)	W
Harry Spanjer (USA)	L

Note: Jack Egan originally won the silver medal in the lightweight competition and the bronze medal in the welterweight competition. Later, it was discovered that his real name was Frank Joseph Floyd, with AAU rules making it illegal to fight under an assumed name. In November 1905 the AAU disqualified Egan from all AAU competitions and ordered him to return all his prizes and medals. Russell van Horn was upgraded to silver and Peter Sturholdt was awarded the bronze in the lightweight competition while Joseph Lydon kept bronze in the welterweight competition.

== Sources ==
- Wudarski, Pawel (1999). "Wyniki Igrzysk Olimpijskich" (in Polish).
- In November 1905 the AAU disqualified Egan
- IOC's medal database for 1904 Olympics
