= Boxing at the 1904 Summer Olympics – Lightweight =

Men's lightweight boxing at the Games of the III Olympiad
- Venue: Physical Culture Gymnasium (Washington University in St. Louis)
- Dates: September 21, 1904 (quarterfinals and semifinals); September 22, 1904 (final)
- Competitors: 8 from 1 nation

Medalists
1st place, gold medalist(s)		Harry Spanjer	United States
2nd place, silver medalist(s)		Russell van Horn	United States
3rd place, bronze medalist(s)		Peter Sturholdt	United States

The lightweight was the median boxing weight class held as part of the Boxing at the 1904 Summer Olympics programme. The competition was held on Wednesday, September 21, 1904 and on Thursday, September 22, 1904. It was the first time the event, like all other boxing events, was held in Olympic competition. Lightweights had to be less than 61.2 kilograms. Eight boxers competed.

== Results ==
Quarter-finals
Harry Spanjer (USA)	KO2
Kenneth Jewett (USA)	L
Russell van Horn (USA)	W
Arthur Seward (USA)	DSQ
Peter Sturholdt (USA)	W
James Bollinger (aka Carroll Burton) (USA)	DSQ ^{1}
Jack Egan (USA)	W
Joseph Lydon (USA)	W/O ^{2}

Semi-finals
Harry Spanjer (USA)	W
Russell van Horn (USA)	L
Peter Sturholdt (USA)	L
Jack Egan (USA)	W

Final
Harry Spanjer (USA)	W
Jack Egan (USA)	Decision ^{3}
Third place
Russell van Horn (USA)	W
Peter Sturholdt (USA)	L

^{1} A well-known local boxer, Carroll Burton, entered the tournament and originally won the bout against Sturholdt by decision. However, officials discovered afterwards that "Burton" was an impostor named James Bollinger, with AAU rules making it illegal to fight under an assumed name. Bollinger was ejected from the competition and Sturholdt was advanced to the next round.

^{2} Egan won the bout on walkover as Lydon was injured.

^{3} Jack Egan originally won the silver medal in the lightweight competition and the bronze medal in the welterweight competition. However, it was later discovered that his real name was Frank Joseph Floyd, with AAU rules making it illegal to fight under an assumed name. In November 1905 the AAU disqualified Egan from all AAU competitions, ordering him to return his prizes and medals. Russell van Horn got silver and Peter Sturholdt got bronze in the lightweight competition, and Joseph Lydon kept bronze in the welterweight competition.

== Sources ==
- Wudarski, Pawel (1999). "Wyniki Igrzysk Olimpijskich" (in Polish).
- November 1905 AAU disqualification of Egan
- IOC's medal database for event at 1904 Olympics
