= Joe Lydon =

Joe Lydon may refer to:

- Joe Lydon (rugby) (born 1963), English rugby league footballer and rugby union coach
- Joe Lydon (boxer) (1878–1937), American welterweight boxer
- Joseph Lydon (model) (born 2004), American fashion model and social media personality
