= Senator Graham =

Senator Graham may refer to:

== Members of the United States Senate ==
- Lindsey Graham (1955–2026), U.S. Senator from South Carolina from 2003 to 2026 and brother of Darline Graham
- Darline Graham (born 1964), U.S. Senator from South Carolina since 2026 and sister of Lindsey Graham
- Bob Graham (1936–2024), U.S. Senator from Florida from 1987 to 2005
- Frank Porter Graham (1886–1972), U.S. Senator from North Carolina from 1949 to 1950
- William Alexander Graham (1804–1875), U.S. Senator from North Carolina from 1840 to 1843, and Confederate States Senator from 1864 to 1865

== United States state senate members ==
- Chuck Graham (1965–2020), Missouri State Senate
- Clifford Graham (fl. 2010s), Senate of the U.S. Virgin Islands
- Ernest R. Graham (politician) (1886–1957), Florida State Senate
- Hiram P. Graham (1820–1902), Wisconsin State Senate
- J. Clint Graham (1870–1921), Oklahoma State Senate
- James H. Graham (1812–1881), New York State Senate
- Jeffrey R. Graham (fl. 2020s), South Carolina State Senate
- John A. Graham (1911–1979), Illinois State Senate
- Malcolm D. Graham (1827–1878), Texas State Senate
- Malcolm Graham (politician) (born 1963), North Carolina State Senate
- Philip A. Graham (1910–1993), Massachusetts State Senate
- Pud Graham (1936–2011), Mississippi State Senate
- Richey V. Graham (1886–1972), Illinois State Senate
- William A. Graham (agriculture commissioner) (1839–1923), North Carolina State Senate
- William M. Graham (politician) (1819–1886), New York State Senate

== See also ==
- Phil Gramm (born 1942), U.S. Senator from Texas from 1985 to 2002
