= Boxing at the 1904 Summer Olympics – Bantamweight =

Men's bantamweight boxing at the Games of the III Olympiad
- Venue: Physical Culture Gymnasium (Washington University in St. Louis)
- Date: September 22, 1904
- Competitors: 2 from 1 nation

Medalists
| 1st place, gold medalist(s) | | Oliver Kirk | United States |
| 2nd place, silver medalist(s) | | George Finnegan | United States |

The bantamweight was the second-lightest boxing weight class held as part of the boxing programme at the 1904 Summer Olympics. The competition was held on September 22, 1904. It was the first time the event, like all other boxing events, was held in Olympic competition. Bantamweights had to weigh less than 52.2 kilograms. There were two entrants in this competition.

== Results ==
| Final |
| 1 | Oliver Kirk (USA) | TKO |
| 2 | George Finnegan (USA) | 3rd |

== Sources ==
- Wudarski, Pawel (1999). "Wyniki Igrzysk Olimpijskich" (in Polish).
