= Spradley =

Spradley is a surname. Notable people with the surname include:

- Benjamin Spradley, American boxer
- Doug Spradley (born 1966), American-German basketball coach and former player
- James Spradley (1933–1982), American ethnographer and anthropologist
- Lola Spradley (born 1946), Speaker of the Colorado House of Representatives from 2003-2005
