= Albert Young (boxer) =

American boxer

Medal record

Men's boxing

Representing the United States

Olympic Games
Gold medal – first place	1904 St. Louis	Welterweight

Albert Young (September 28, 1877 – July 22, 1940) was an American welterweight boxer who competed in the early twentieth century. He won a gold medal in boxing at the 1904 Summer Olympics.

Young was born in Lauterecken, German Empire in 1877.

== Amateur career ==
As an amateur boxer, Young captured the Olympic Gold Medal at 148 pounds, in the 1904 Olympic Games in St. Louis. Young was one of only four boxers, all Americans, who competed in this weight class. 85% of the athletes in total were Americans. Young defeated Harry Spanger in the final to win the gold medal.

=== Olympic results ===
- Defeated Jack Egan (United States) points
- Defeated Harry Spanger (United States) points

== Life after boxing ==
After he had quit boxing, became a promoter in his native San Francisco starting in 1906. Young initially worked at the Association Club, a small club where many Bay Area boxers got their start, before advancing on to bigger shows. In 1923, Young moved his promotional operations to National Hall, where he continued promoting entry level bouts.

After 10-round bouts were legalized at the start of 1925, Young would feature higher quality bouts, usually with a 10-round main event, while still maintaining his role as the starting place for young Bay Area boxers. During the 1920s, Young was also involved at the Golden Gate Arena in San Francisco.

Once the great depression hit, Young struggled to stay afloat, like many fellow promoters. He would promote much more sporadically during this period.

Young would continue promoting until his death in 1940 at National Hall in San Francisco, California. Young who suffered from anemia and ulcers, died after several unsuccessful blood transfusions. Many of the blood donations, came from former fighters that Young had promoted. He was survived by a wife and a daughter.
