= Harry Spanjer =

American boxer (1873–1958)

Medal record

Men's boxing

Representing the United States

Olympic Games
Gold medal – first place	1904 St. Louis	Lightweight
Silver medal – second place	1904 St. Louis	Welterweight

Henry John Spanjer (January 9, 1873 – July 16, 1958) was an American lightweight and welterweight boxer who competed in the early twentieth century.

He was born in Grand Rapids, Michigan and died in St. Petersburg, Florida. The correct spelling of his name is "Spanjer" nevertheless many sources misspell his name as "Spanger".

In the lightweight category of the 1904 Summer Olympics he defeated fellow American Jack Egan in the final to win a gold medal but took silver in the heavier welterweight category.

He won two medals in Boxing at the 1904 Summer Olympics, one of only a four boxers to capture more than one medal in the same Olympics. George Finnegan, Charles Mayer, and Oliver Kirk, who also competed in St. Louis, were the others.
