= Charles Mayer (boxer) =

American boxer

Medal record

Men's boxing

Representing the United States

Olympic Games
Gold medal – first place	1904 St. Louis	Middleweight
Silver medal – second place	1904 St. Louis	Heavyweight

Charles Mayer (7 January 1882 – 5 May 1972) was an American middleweight and heavyweight boxer who competed in the early twentieth century.

He won two medals in boxing at the 1904 Summer Olympics, one of only five boxers in Olympic history to ever do so. In the middleweight category he defeated fellow American Benjamin Spradley in the final to win a gold medal but took silver in the heavier heavyweight category. Mayer only had to compete in two fights to capture his two medals, in the middleweight class only two boxers participated. In the heavyweight class there were three boxers with Mayer earning the bye in the first round.

Mayer was the National Amateur Middleweight Champion in 1905.

== 1904 Olympic results ==
Middleweight

- Final: Defeated Benjamin Spradley (United States) TKO 3

Heavyweight

- Semifinal: bye
- Final: Lost to Sam Berger on points
