= George Finnegan =

American boxer (1881–1913)

Olympic medal record

Men's boxing

Representing the United States
Gold medal – first place	1904 Saint Louis	Flyweight
Silver medal – second place	1904 Saint Louis	Bantamweight

George V. Finnegan (September 28, 1881 – February 28, 1913) was an American bantamweight and flyweight boxer who competed in the early twentieth century. He died in San Francisco, California.

Finnegan won two medals in Boxing at the 1904 Summer Olympics, a gold medal in the flyweight category and a silver medal against fellow American boxer Oliver Kirk in the bantamweight category in which he gained several pounds in several days. Alongside Kirk, Finnegan remains only one of four boxers in boxing history to win medals in two separate weight divisions at the same Olympics.
