= Peter Sturholdt =

American boxer

Peter Johnson Sturholdt (December 7, 1885 – June 27, 1919) was an American boxer who competed in the 1904 Summer Olympics. Sturholdt was born in Red Wing, Minnesota. In 1904, he finished fourth in the lightweight class after losing the bronze medal fight to Russell van Horn.

In November 1905 the Amateur Athletic Union disqualified the second-placed Jack Egan from all AAU competitions and he had to return all his prizes, including his Olympic medals. Although not recognized then or since by Olympic records, Sports Reference has listed Sturholdt as the bronze medalist since researcher Taavi Kalju noted the discrepancy in 2008.

Sturholdt died in St. Louis, Missouri, where he worked as a painter and cabinet maker. He fell to his death when the scaffolding he was on broke while painting. He left behind his wife, Margaret M. Terney, and 5 children: Adele, Margaret (Marge), Orvin John, Peter J., and Davis.
