= Russell van Horn =

American boxer (1885–1970)

Medal record

Men's boxing

Representing the United States

Olympic Games
Silver medal – second place	1904 St. Louis	Lightweight

William Russell van Horn (July 30, 1885 – March 11, 1970) was an American lightweight boxer who competed in the early twentieth century. He was born in Pennsylvania and died in Wickenburg, Arizona.

In 1904, van Horn won a bronze medal in the lightweight class. In November 1905, the AAU disqualified the second placed Jack Egan from all AAU competitions and he had to return all his prizes. Therefore, van Horn moved up to silver.
