= Samuel Berger (boxer) =

American boxer (1884–1925)

Sam Berger

Personal information
- Nickname: Smiling Sammy
- Born: December 25, 1884 Chicago, Illinois, US
- Died: February 23, 1925 (aged 40) San Francisco, California, US
- Height: 6 ft 1.5 in (1.87 m)
- Weight: Heavyweight

Boxing career
- Reach: 6 ft 3 in (1.91 m)
- Stance: Orthodox

Boxing record
- Total fights: 10 (partial record)
- Wins: 6
- Win by KO: 5
- Losses: 2
- Draws: 2
- No contests: 0
Medal record
Men's boxing
Representing the United States
Olympic Games
Gold medal – first place	1904 St. Louis	Heavyweight

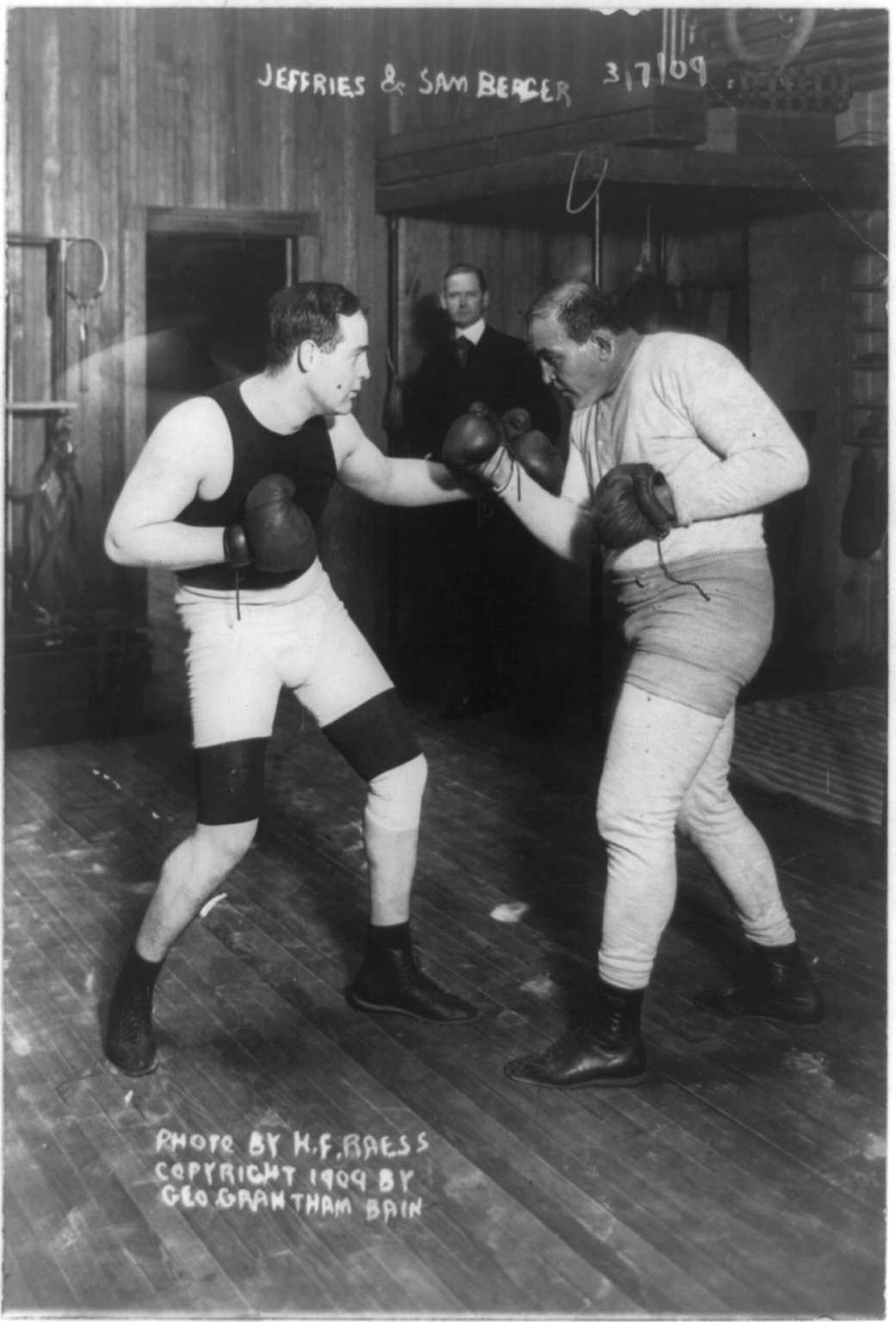
Sparring with Jim Jeffries, 1909

Samuel Berger (December 25, 1884 – February 23, 1925) was an American heavyweight boxer who won the first Olympic Gold Medal in heavyweight boxing in 1904, competed as a professional, and acted as a promoter and manager for heavyweight Jim Jeffries in the first two decades of the 20th century.

== Early life and amateur career ==
Berger was born in Chicago, Illinois, on December 25, 1884, to a Jewish family of Polish descent. His father Reuben was a cigar merchant. Berger joined the Olympic Club in San Francisco when he was 16 years old and was also a member of the South End Rowing Club. In 1901 he took the amateur middleweight championship of the Pacific Coast at only seventeen, and the following year won the amateur heavyweight championship. Berger had 40 amateur fights, most of which were won by knockout.

=== Winning the first Heavyweight Gold Medal in boxing, St. Louis Worlds Fair, 1904 ===
He won the first gold medal in Boxing at the 1904 Summer Olympics, as heavyweight boxing had not earlier been featured in the Olympics. Berger defeated William Michaels in the semi-finals of the St. Louis Olympics and Charles Mayer, the middleweight champion, in the finals to take the Olympic Gold Medal. Having only eleven countries competing, the Olympic competition was not nearly as competitive as today, and occurred largely as an entertainment for the St. Louis World's Fair.

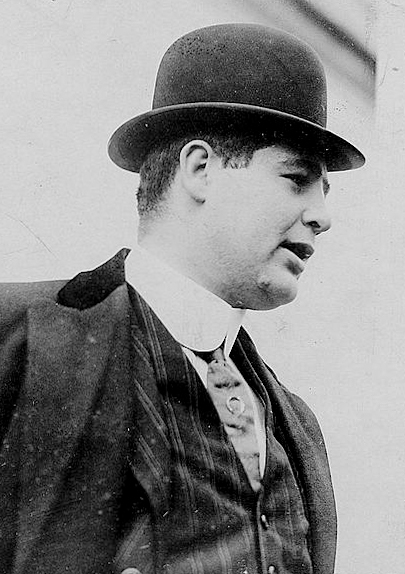
Berger, originally taken with Jeffries circa 1908

== Boxing career ==
=== Amateur boxing career ===
In one of his first fights on May 14, 1902, Berger defeated Andy Gallagher in a third round technical knockout at the Olympic Athletic Club in San Francisco. Berger defeated Jack Joyce on July 10, 1902, in a four round points decision at the Mechanic's Pavilion in San Francisco as part of the Aerial Rowing Club. The match was part of the competition for Heavyweight Championship of the Pacific Coast. Berger seemed to land more blows, taking the Pacific Coast Championship, and Joyce did not appear to have trained adequately for the event.

Berger defeated George Sullivan in a fourth round knockout at Mechanic's Pavilion in San Francisco on January 19, 1904. A right and left to the head put Sullivan to the mat for good in the fourth. A short left hook dropped Sullivan as early as the first round, and he was down four times in the second, though several times purely to escape punishment, and he continued to fight back. Sullivan led decisively in the third landing punches almost at will. In the fourth, Sullivan clinched with frequency, and Berger was able to pummel him with left hooks after every break. Sullivan was unable to rise to the canvas after his fourth round knockout and was assisted to his corner by his seconds.

On May 25, 1904, Berger was defeated by William Rodenbach in a four round unanimous decision at the Mechanics Pavilion in San Francisco. The fight was billed as a heavyweight amateur championship. Berger had his best showing in the first and part of the second rounds, but afterwards, Rodenbach had the best of the fighting. Rodenbach was the American middle and heavyweight amateur champion.

=== Professional boxing career ===
On February 17, 1905, Berger defeated Jim Casey in a first round knockout at Woodward's Pavilion in San Francisco. The bout could be considered Berger's professional debut. Berger sent Casey to the mat with a swift right uppercut to the jaw. When Casey arose, a series from both fists ended the bout only two minutes into the first round.

Berger knocked out Joe Long in the third of four rounds in San Francisco on March 3, 1905. Berger knocked long to the mat for nine seconds in the second round. He put Long to the mat once more, before Long arose, and was put to the mat a third time. Long's seconds protested that he was not down a full ten seconds, so Long came out for the third round, and was put to the mat for the final time by Berger with a stiff blow to the jaw.

Berger defeated Bill Rickard in San Francisco on March 16, 1905, by a knockout only 1:23 into the first round. He first dropped Rickard for a short count, and put him to the mat for good with a left right combination to the jaw.

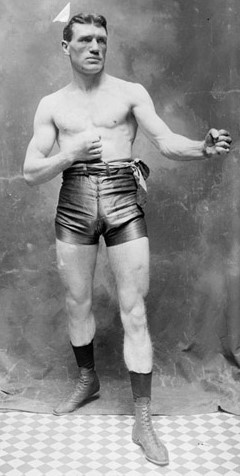
Philadelphia Jack O'Brien

=== Important bout with light heavyweight champion "Philadelphia Jack O'Brien", July 1906 ===
On July 16, 1906, Berger fought six no-decision rounds in Philadelphia with the 1905 Light Heavyweight champion Philadelphia Jack O'Brien. Newspapers accounts varied as to who won the bout. The New York World and Philadelphia Inquirer came out heavily for Berger, but the Washington Post considered the match a draw. The match, due to its large audience and the excitement it generated, was considered to be the most noteworthy of Berger's professional career. In the second and third, Berger opened a cut on O'Brien's left eye, but O'Brien scored with solid lefts to the chin of Berger at many points in the bout. The Los Angeles Times considered the fighting close, but gave a slight edge to O'Brien, who may have landed more telling blows, though Berger was the aggressor through much of the bout even in the fifth, when O'Brien landed frequently with his powerful left to the chin of Berger. The Times gave five rounds to O'Brien, though they considered several rounds to be quite close. Both boxers were bloodied by the second round. The referee needed to separate them frequently, as they clinched to retain their endurance and escape the blows of their opponent.

In another important bout, Berger took a beating and lost to Al Kaufman in a tenth round technical knockout on October 31, 1906, in San Francisco's Dreamland Pavilion. The scheduled 20 round fight was stopped in the tenth when Berger's seconds threw up the sponge. Kaufman was down twice in the third from blows by Berger, once with a right to the jaw for a count of nine at the round's opening and once with a left to the jaw for another count of nine, but Kaufman had a small but decided edge in the remaining rounds. Kaufman's constant jabs, particularly with his left during the infighting, tired Berger till his seconds were forced to concede in the tenth. The loss ended Sam Berger's career as a boxer.

== Life outside boxing ==
He was married to Etta Friedman Berger.

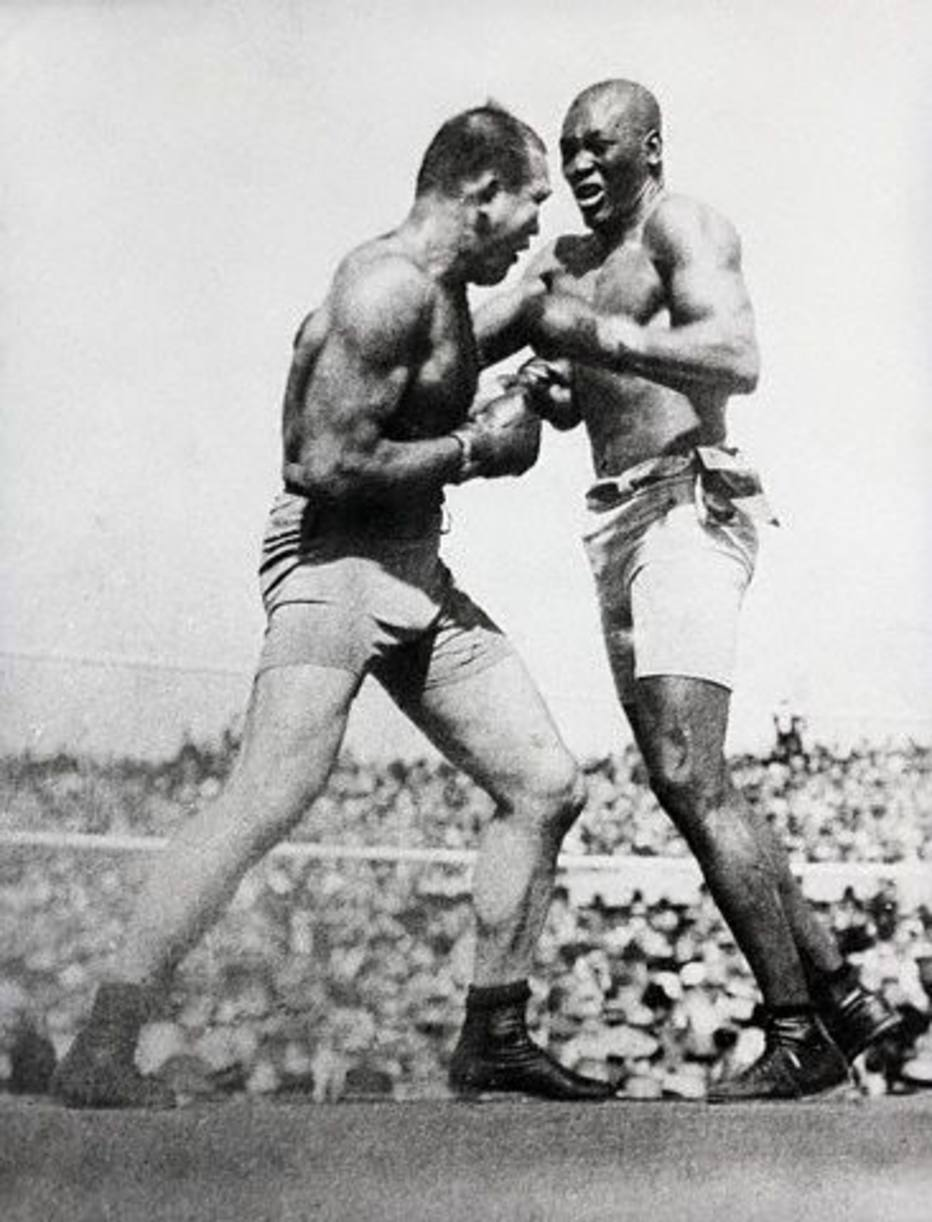
Jeffries vs. Johnson, July 4, 1910

In October 1907 Berger was appointed boxing instructor at the University of California. During this time he worked as both a promoter and referee for various boxing competitions. After his boxing career, he became a successful businessman, holding interest in a high end clothing store in San Francisco, run by his two brothers Nat and Maurice. He also reported on boxing matches for the San Francisco Call. He returned to the Olympic Club, which he had been required to resign as a professional, and headed up sports programs there.

In 1909 Berger faced heavyweight champion Jim Jeffries in at least five exhibitions in Pennsylvania and New York, and had two exhibition with him in California in 1910. At the time, Jeffries was one of highest paid vaudeville attractions in the United States, having retired undefeated as Heavyweight champion, and Berger's management of Jeffries was a lucrative proposition. He managed Jeffries for his fight in Reno, Nevada against black heavyweight champion Jack Johnson on July 4, 1910. As quite a profitable affair, the "Fight of the Century", drew 20,000, and fetched over $100,000 to divide between Berger, various trainers and support personnel, and Jeffries, whose cut was $60,000.

He had been in ill health for about a year before he died in San Francisco on February 23, 1925, at age 40. Perhaps a greater success at the business of refereeing and promoting boxing than competing, he died with a fortune equivalent to a million dollars today. Berger, who was Jewish, was inducted into the International Jewish Sports Hall of Fame in 1985.

== See also ==
- List of select Jewish boxers
