= Clifford Graham =

American politician

Clifford F. Graham is a St. Thomian corporate executive and former Democratic member of the Legislature of the U.S. Virgin Islands from the St. Thomas/St. John District. In April 2017, U.S.V.I. governor Kenneth Mapp appointed Graham as head of the West Indian Company (W.I.C.O.) to replace Joseph Boschulte as President and CEO.
