= Oliver Kirk =

American boxer (1884–1960)

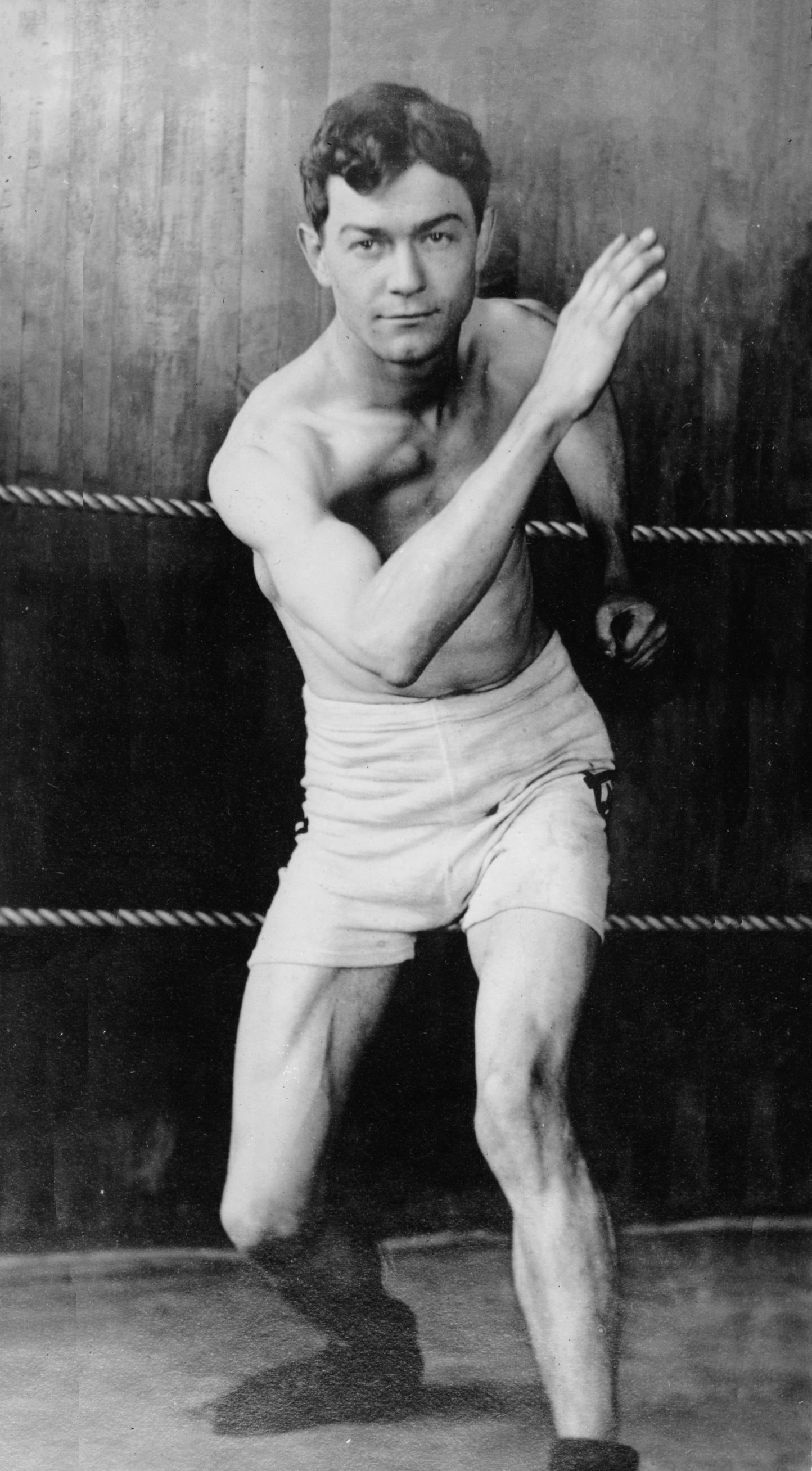

Personal information
- Born: April 20, 1884 Beatrice, Nebraska, U.S.
- Died: March 14, 1960 (age 75) St. Louis, Missouri, U.S.
Medal record
Men's boxing
Representing the United States
Olympic Games
Gold medal – first place	1904 St. Louis	Bantamweight
Gold medal – first place	1904 St. Louis	Featherweight

Oliver Leonard Kirk (April 20, 1884 – March 14, 1960) was an American bantamweight and featherweight professional boxer who won two gold medals in Boxing at the 1904 Summer Olympics. He was born in Beatrice, Nebraska and died in St. Louis, Missouri.

Kirk is the only boxer in Olympic history to ever win two gold medals in two separate weight divisions at the same Olympics. He won gold in the featherweight and lost almost 10 pounds in under two weeks and also won gold in the bantamweight category. Kirk only had to win two fights to capture his two gold medals, in the bantamweight class only two boxers competed. In the featherweight class there were three boxers with Kirk earning the bye in the first round.
