= Benjamin Spradley =

American boxer

Medal record

Men's boxing

Representing the United States

Olympic Games
| Silver medal – second place | 1904 St. Louis | Middleweight |

Benjamin Spradley (born 18 January 1879, date of death unknown) was an American middleweight boxer who competed in the early twentieth century. He won a silver medal in Boxing at the 1904 Summer Olympics. His feat, however, was achieved without a Spradley recording a single victory as there were only two entrants in the middleweight division of the Olympic boxing tournament in 1904. In the only bout in that weight classification, Spradley was knocked out in the third round by fellow American Charles Mayer.
