= Boxing at the 1904 Summer Olympics =

Boxing at the Games of the III Olympiad
- Dates: 21-22 September 1904
- Competitors: 18

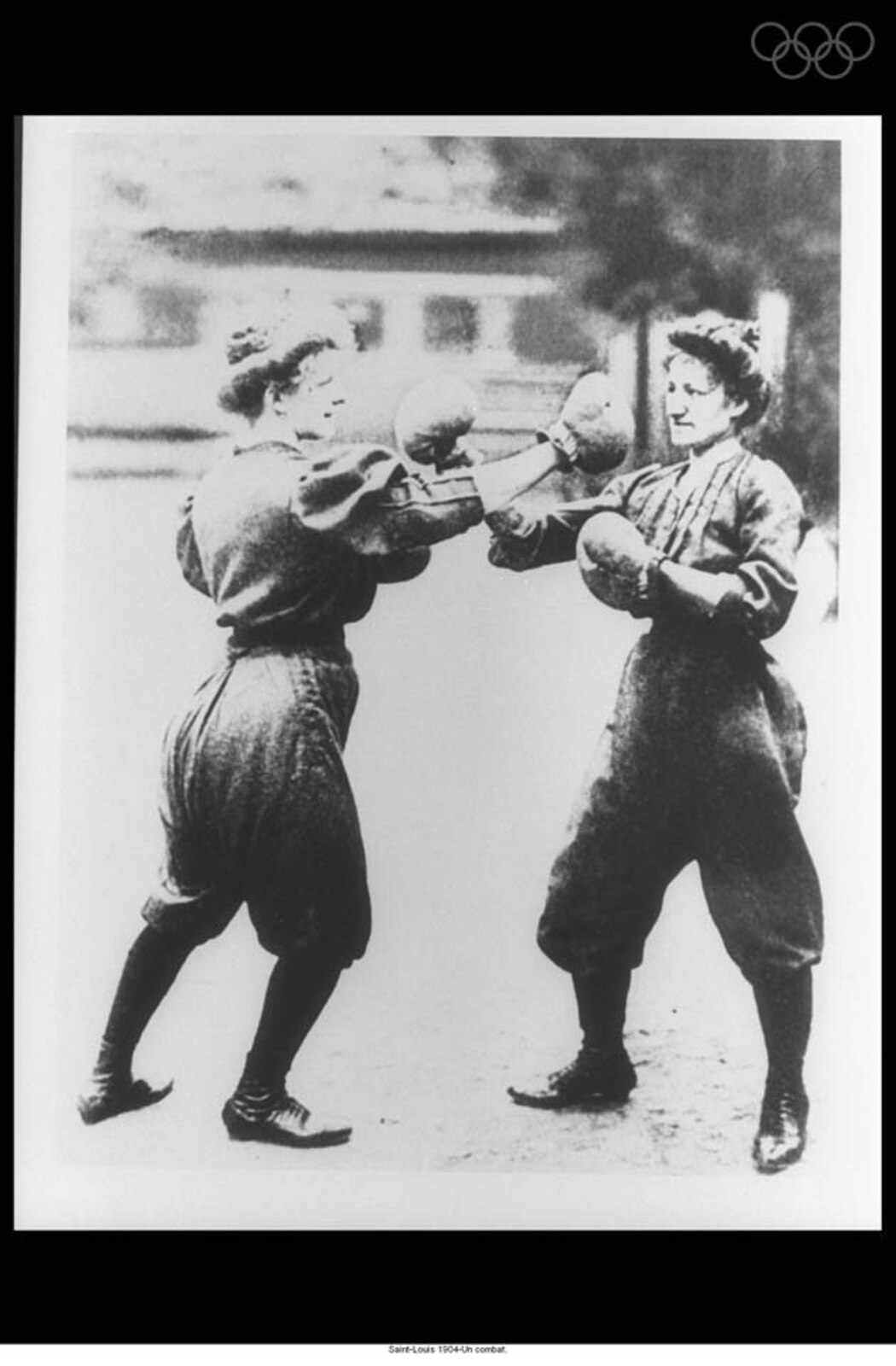
Two women boxing in the 1904 Olympics in St. Louis.

At the 1904 Summer Olympics, seven boxing events were contested, with the sport making its Olympic debut. The competitions were held on Wednesday, September 21, 1904 and on Thursday, September 22, 1904. Contestants in lighter weight classes could also compete in heavier classes. Oliver Kirk, winning the bantamweight and featherweight categories, thus became the only boxer to have won two gold medals in the same Olympics. George Finnegan, Harry Spanjer and Charles Mayer won one gold and one silver medal.

There was also a demonstration bout of women's boxing, which would be added to the Olympic program in 2012.

== Medal summary ==
Games	Gold	Silver	Bronze
Flyweight (47.6 kg / 105 lb)	George Finnegan; United States	Miles Burke; United States	Only two competitors entered
Bantamweight (52.2 kg / 115 lb)	Oliver Kirk; United States	George Finnegan; United States	Only two competitors entered
Featherweight (56.7 kg / 125 lb)	Oliver Kirk; United States	Frank Haller; United States	Frederick Gilmore; United States
Lightweight (61.2 kg / 135 lb)	Harry Spanjer; United States	Russell van Horn; United States	Peter Sturholdt; United States
Welterweight (65.8 kg / 145 lb)	Albert Young; United States	Harry Spanjer; United States	Joseph Lydon; United States
Middleweight (71.7 kg / 158 lb)	Charles Mayer; United States	Benjamin Spradley; United States	Only two competitors entered
Heavyweight (over 71.7 kg/over 158 lb)	Samuel Berger; United States	Charles Mayer; United States	William Michaels; United States

Note: Jack Egan originally won the silver medal in the lightweight competition and the bronze medal in the welterweight competition. Later, it was discovered that his real name was Frank Joseph Floyd, with AAU rules making it illegal to fight under an assumed name. In November 1905 the AAU disqualified Egan from all AAU competitions, and ordered him to return all his prizes and medals.

Thus, Russell van Horn was upgraded to silver and Peter Sturholdt was awarded the bronze in the lightweight competition, while Joseph Lydon kept bronze in the welterweight competition.

== Participating nations ==
A total of 18 boxers competed at the St. Louis Games:

- United States (18)

== Medal table ==
Rank	Nation	Gold	Silver	Bronze	Total
1	United States	7	7	4	18
Totals (1 entries)		7	7	4	18
