= Joe Lydon (boxer) =

American boxer

Joseph Patrick Lydon
Personal information
- Born: February 2, 1878; Swinford, County Mayo, Ireland
- Died: August 19, 1937 (aged 59)

Olympic medal record

Men's Soccer

Representing United States
Silver medal – second place	1904 St. Louis	Team competition

Men's Boxing

Representing United States
Bronze medal – third place	1904 St. Louis	Welterweight

Joseph Patrick Lydon (February 2, 1878 – August 19, 1937) was an American welterweight boxer who competed in the early twentieth century. He was born in Swinford, County Mayo, Ireland. He competed at the 1904 Summer Olympics, tying for a bronze medal in the welterweight division with fellow American boxer Jack Egan.

He also competed at the soccer tournament in the 1904 Olympics and his team Christian Brothers College took silver medals.
