= Jack Egan (boxer) =

American boxer (1878–1950)

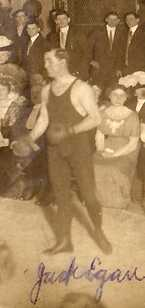
Egan c. 1911

Frank Joseph Floyd (who fought under name Jack Egan) (May 27, 1878 – March 15, 1950) was an American lightweight and welterweight boxer who competed in the early twentieth century.

== Biography ==
He was born in Philadelphia, Pennsylvania on May 27, 1878.

Egan competed in boxing at the 1904 Summer Olympics, where he participated in two separate weight classes. Egan earned a silver medal in the lightweight category, losing to Harry Spanjer in the final. He tied for the bronze medal in the welterweight category against fellow American boxer, Joseph Lydon. By the rules of the AAU it was illegal to fight under an assumed name. In November 1905, the AAU disqualified Egan from all AAU competitions and he had to return all his prizes including his two Olympics medals.

He died on March 15, 1950.
