= Saxon Garden =

Public garden in Warsaw, Poland

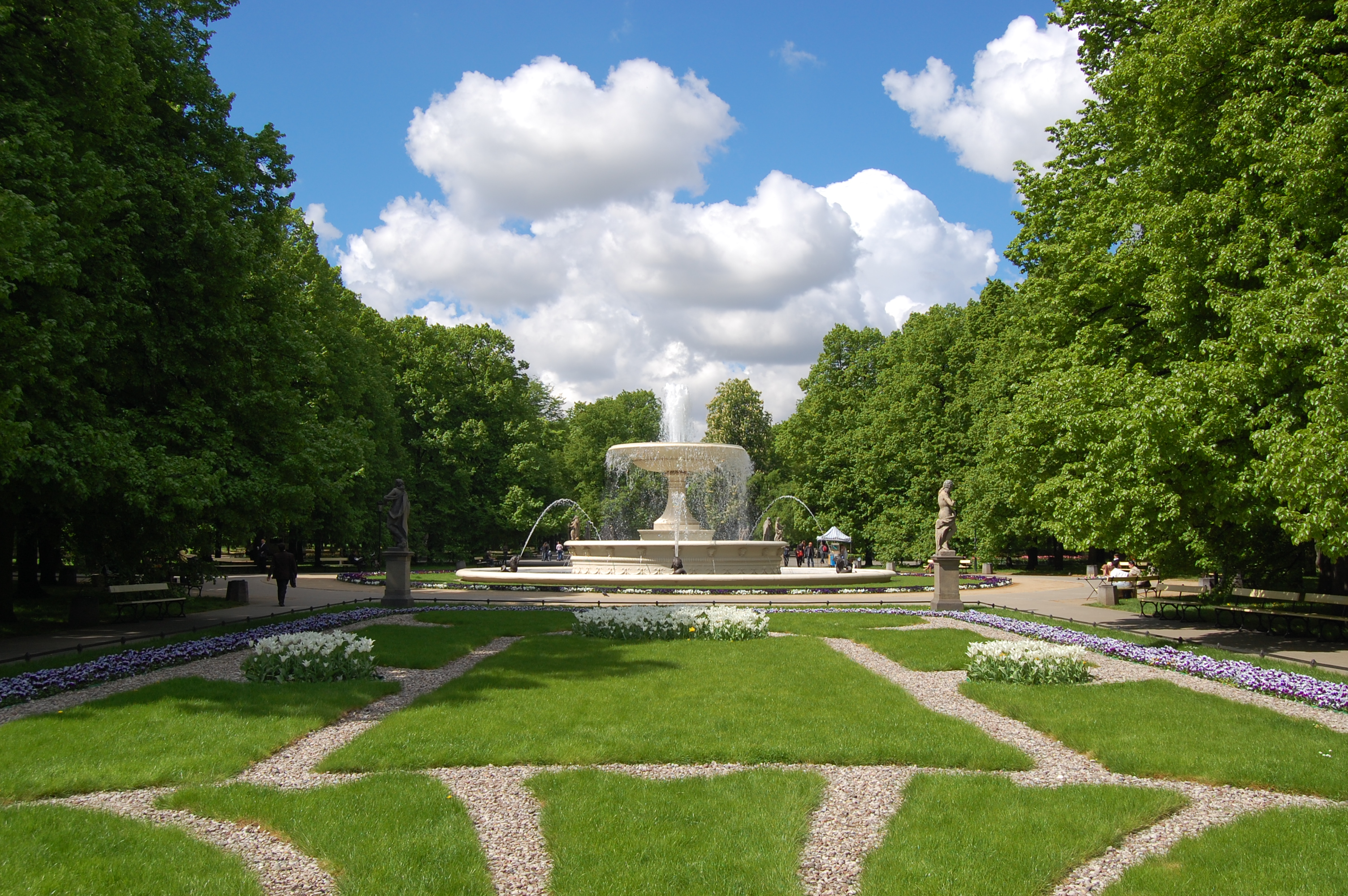
- Fountain in the Saxon Garden.
- Interactive map of Saxon Garden
- Type: Municipal
- Location: Warsaw
- Coordinates: 52°14′26″N 21°00′31″E
- Area: 15.5 ha
- Created: 1727
- Status: Open all year
- Public transit: Świętokrzyska, Ratusz Arsenał; 106 107 128 175

Historic Monument of Poland
- Designated: 1994-09-08
- Part of: Warsaw – historic city center with the Royal Route and Wilanów
- Reference no.: M.P. 1994 nr 50 poz. 423

The Saxon Garden (Polish: Ogród Saski) is a 15.5–hectare public garden in central (Śródmieście) Warsaw, Poland, facing Piłsudski Square. It is the oldest public park in the city. Founded in the late 17th century, it was opened to the public in 1727 as one of the first publicly accessible parks in the world.

== History ==
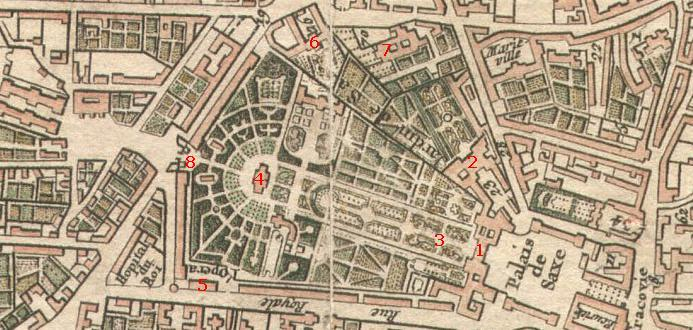
Plan of the Saxon Garden

The Saxon Garden was originally the site of Warsaw fortifications, "Sigismund's Ramparts", and of a palace built in 1666 for the powerful aristocrat, Jan Andrzej Morsztyn. The garden was extended in the reign of King Augustus II, who attached it to the "Saxon Axis", a line of parks and palaces linking the western outskirts of Warsaw with the Vistula River.

The park of the adjoining Saxon Palace was opened to the public on 27 May 1727. It became a public park before Versailles (1791), the Pavlovsk Palace, Peterhof Palace and Summer Garden (1918), Villa d'Este (1920), Kuskovo (1939), Stourhead (1946), Sissinghurst (1967), Stowe (1990), Vaux-le-Vicomte (1990s), and most other world-famous parks and gardens.

Initially a Baroque French-style park, in the 19th century it was turned into a Romantic English-style landscape park. Destroyed during and after the Warsaw Uprising, it was partly reconstructed after World War II.

== Features ==
=== 18th century ===
The garden was a typical example of the Baroque extension of formal vistas inspired by the park of Versailles. The park starts from the back façade of the palace, flanking a long alley with many sculptures. The central avenue lead directly to the palace, as was usual in French parks of the era.

Following the completion of the Saxon Palace, the surroundings were included in the structure. The Brühl Palace and The Blue Palace, as well as the pavilion known as The Great Salon, were all raised or rebuilt during the initial construction of Saxon Establishment during the reign of Augustus II. A baroque flower garden with pieces of turf, flower beds, hedges and trees was created. These gardens extended the central axis of a symmetrical building façade in rigorously symmetrical axial designs of patterned parterres, gravel walks and formally planted bosquets. The parterres were laid out from 1713 by Joachim Heinrich Schultze and Gothard Paul Thörl from 1735.

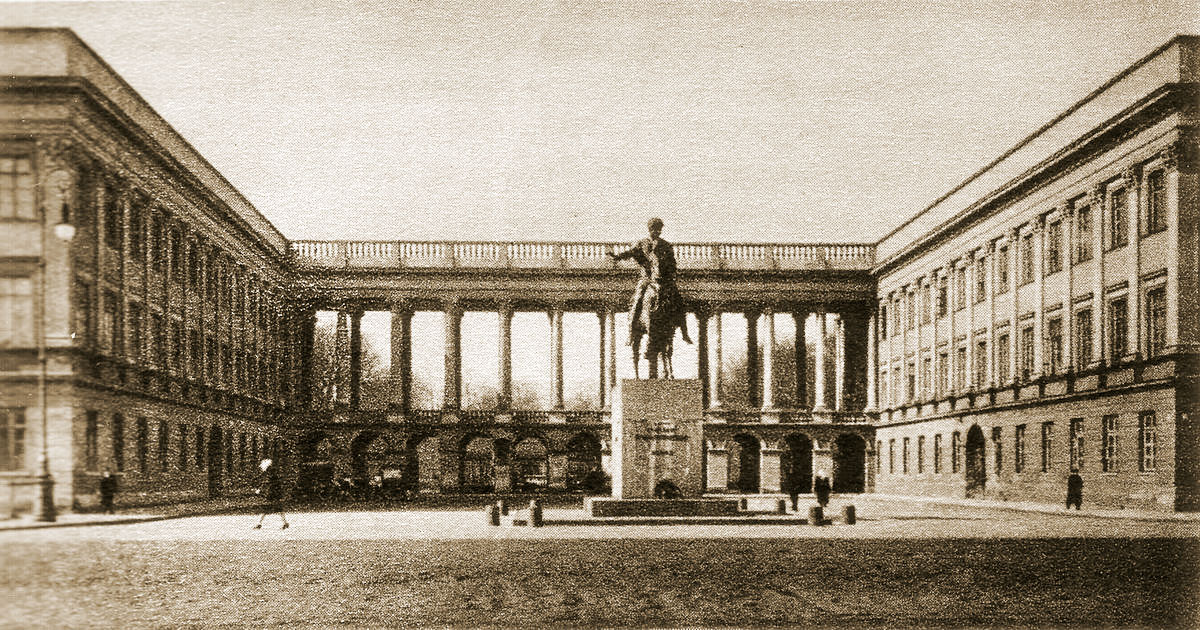
Saxon Palace

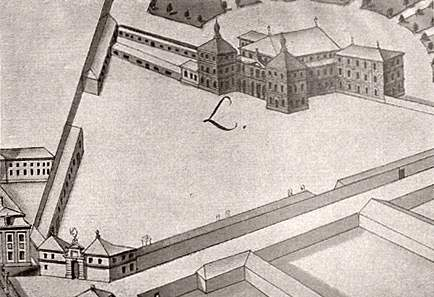
Brühl Palace

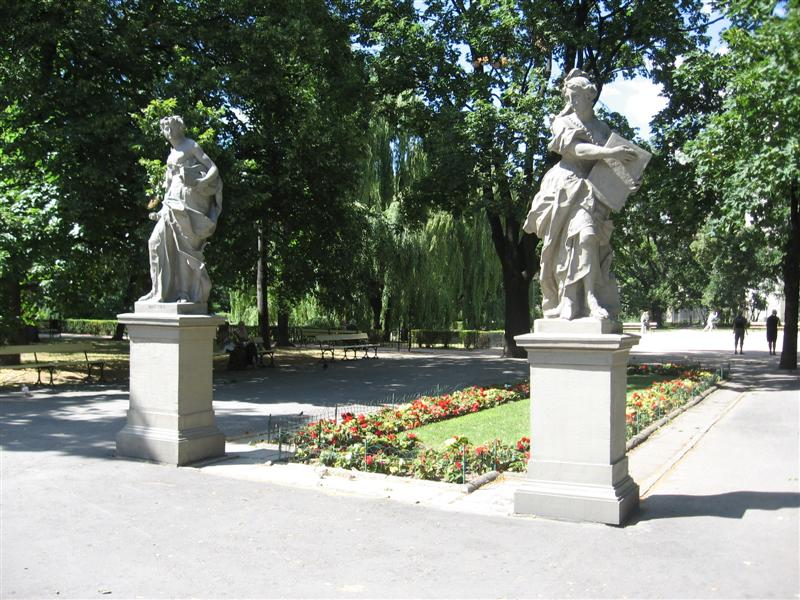
Rococo sculptures

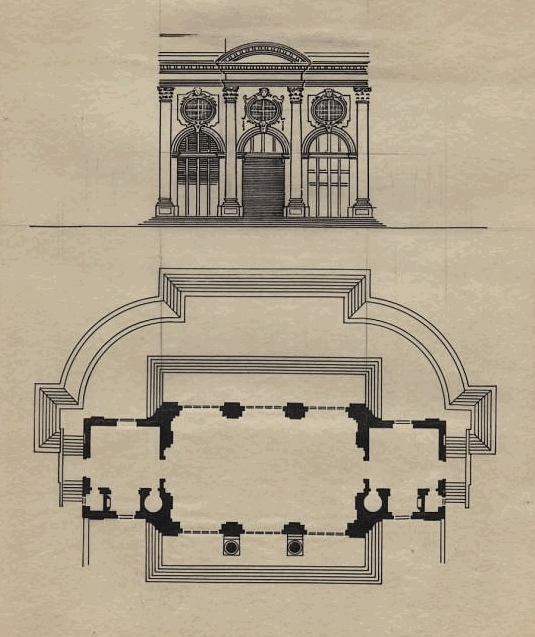
Great Salon

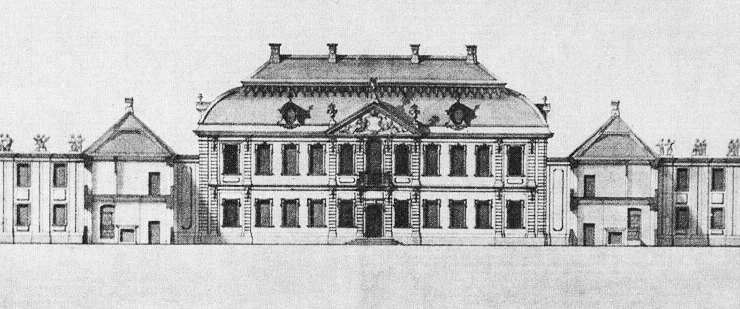
Blue Palace

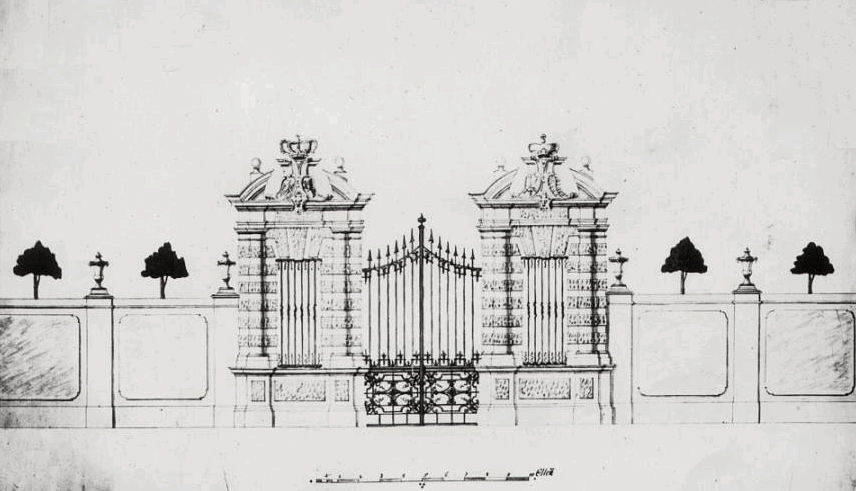
Iron Gate

- Saxon Palace. A vast palace complex according to Tylman van Gameren's design arose here between 1661 and 1664 for Jan Andrzej Morsztyn. In 1669 the palace was rebuilt and enlarged. The main break was enhanced and a two galleries ended with a double-storied pavillons were added to the palace's alcoves. In 1713 the building was purchased by King Augustus II, who started to repurchase surrounding freeholds and demolishing the buildings. Reconstruction of the palace establishment and creating of the Saxon Axis passed through three distinct stages – from 1713 to the 1720s according to Carl Friedrich Pöppelmann's and Joachim Daniel von Jauch's design, secondly to 1733 and completion in 1748 by Augustus III "the Corpulent". The palace was remodeled in 1842. During World War II, the Saxon Palace was blown up by the Germans after the collapse of the Warsaw Uprising in 1944.
- Brühl Palace, former palace of Jerzy Ossoliński, was rebuilt between 1681 and 1697 by Tylman van Gameren. Purchased by Heinrich von Brühl in 1750, on his request it was reconstructed by Johann Friedrich Knöbel and Joachim Daniel von Jauch between 1754 and 1759. The two outbuildings were built in that time and put together with the palace. Later another two outbuildings were added and weaved together by an enclosure decorated with sculptures. The central limb of the building was enhanced and covered with a mansard roof. During 1932–37 the palace was adapted for use as the Ministry for Foreign Affairs of the new Polish Republic. It was deliberately destroyed by the Germans on December 18, 1944.
- Sandstone statues, a part of the rich collection of sculptures removed to Saint Petersburg after recapturing the city by Marshal Suvorov in 1794, and placed in the Summer Garden. According to the 1745 plan of the Saxon Garden there were 70 postuments in the garden, and in 1797 there were only 37 sculptures left; only 20 of them have been preserved until our times. Four of these sculptures were completely destroyed during the blowing up of the Saxon Palace in 1944, but they were later reconstructed. Included are groups of sculptures, including Arithmetic, Astronomy, Bacchus, Flora, Geography, two sculptures identified as Glory, Instruct, Intelligence, Intellect, Justice, Medicine, Military Architecture, Painting, Poetry, Rationality, Science, Sculpture, Venus and Winter. They were generally made before 1745 by anonymous Warsaw sculptors under the direction of Johann Georg Plersch.
- The Great Salon, situated on the axis in the center of a Saxon Garden, was intended simply to provide a suitable end to the main garden axis. It was constructed after 1720 according to Matthäus Daniel Pöppelmann's design. The building was opened to the garden by semicircular porte-fenêtres and oculi. A terrace above the ground level of the building was enclosed by an attic decorated with vases; also, two outhouses from both sides were added. The Great Salon was demolished in 1817.
- Operalnia, the 500-seat opera house, was opened in 1748. It was built under the architect Carl Friedrich Pöppelmann and modelled on the Small Theatre in Dresden, built by Christoph Bayer in 1687. The interior was decorated in a heavy, sumptuous baroque style by the court artists. On November 19, 1765, in Operalnia, the actors of The Majesty put on the premiere of Józef Bielawski's Intruders (Natręci), a comedy which was a loose adaptation of a play by Molière. Since the acting team had all the features of a fully professional and national group (they performed in Polish and earned their living through acting), November 19 is the anniversary of the establishment of the National Theatre. The National stage belonged to the elements of the educational and cultural reform programme in the falling Republic of Poland, prepared by King Stanisław August Poniatowski. Over decades this theatre, taking care of the works of Polish playwrights, was the ground on which the cultural development of Polish people thrived. The building was demolished in 1772.
- The Blue Palace. It takes its name from the colour of the roof. the palace was purchased by King Augustus II for his daughter Anna Karolina Orzelska from bishop Teodor Andrzej Potocki. The palace was rebuilt in 1726 by Joachim Daniel von Jauch and Johann Sigmund Deybel. The King wanted to offer it to Anna as a Christmas present. In six weeks, the palace was renovated by 300 masons and craftsmen working night and day. The courtyard, encompassed by a walled enclosure, had two gates. Column galleries were situated on both sides of the garden façade. A backside garden (integral part of the Saxon Garden) and a cascade fountain were designed by Carl Friedrich Pöppelmann. Since 1811, it has been the property of the Zamoyski family which remodeled it in a late Neoclassical style. The palace was rebuilt after the war devastations.
- The Church of St. Anthony of Padua and Reformed Franciscan Monastery was founded in 1623 in gratitude for the capture of Smolensk on June 13, 1611 (Liturgical Feasts of Saint Anthony of Padua) by Sigismund III Vasa and dedicated on May 13, 1635. This church was heavily damaged during the Deluge by the Transylvanian army of George II Rákóczi. The new church was founded by Castellan Stanisław Leszczyc-Skarszewski. Work began in 1668 following the plan of Józef Szymon Bellotti. In 1734, the church became the parish church of the royal court in the Saxon Palace. The king ordered a special loge for him and his wife to be built on the left side of the presbytery (1734–35), and the royal sculptor Johann Georg Plersch created the sculptures inside. The church was partly destroyed during the Warsaw Uprising.
- The Iron Gate was a part of The Saxon Establishment, which itself had a shape of a pentagon covered an area of around 17 ha. The gate was constructed according to Joachim Daniel von Jauch's design after 1735, together with other buildings of the Saxon Axis border, like Mounted Crown Guards barracks, a wall with bastions from the south and west, or the Blue Palace. It was embellished with cartouches with Polish and Lithuanian coats of arms. The gate was demolished in 1821.

View of The Saxon Establishment from the north painted by Bernardo Bellotto il Canaletto of 1764 shows a main entrance to the palace from Wielopole with The Iron Gate and the 21 m-high garden gloriette, so-called Great Salon.

=== 19th and 20th centuries ===
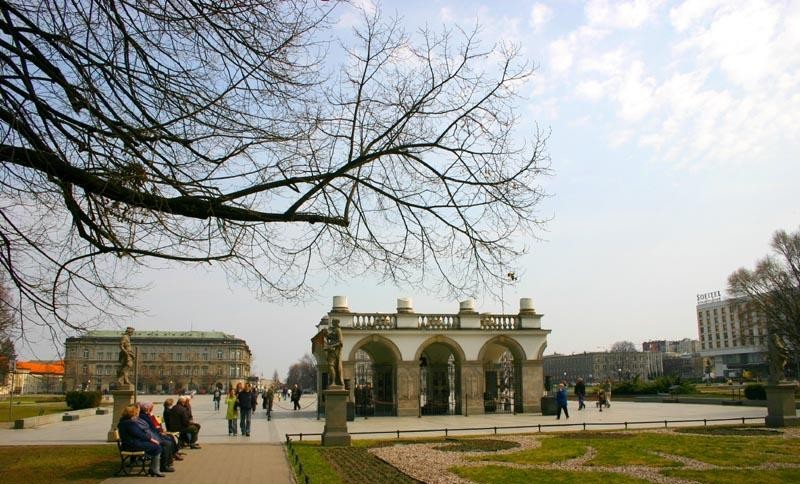
Tomb of the Unknown Soldier

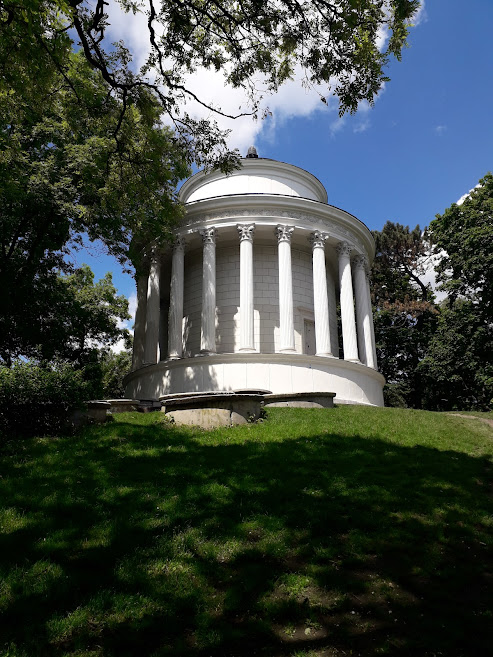
Water Tower

- Tomb of the Unknown Soldier, dedicated to the unknown soldiers who have given their lives for Poland. It is one of many such national tombs of unknowns that were erected after World War I, as well as the most important national symbols of bravery and heroism. In 1925, architect Stanisław Ostrowski produced a design to be located under the arcades of the Saxon Palace in Warsaw. The triple arch of the Tomb is the only remnant of the Saxon Palace colonnade. Here official delegations place wreaths and pay homage to the killed soldiers. The tomb has a change of guards every hour.
- Fountain, with an elaborately carved plaque resting on a shell form basin supported by a scrolled bracket, is often used by dating couples as their meeting place. It was established in 1855. The fountain is the centrepiece of gardens designed by the 19th-century designer Henryk Marconi and also one of the most precious urban symbols of Warsaw.
- Marble sundial, an 1863 horizontal sundial, is situated close to the big fountain in the centre of the park. It was established by the significant physicist and meteorologist Antoni Szeliga Magier (1762–1837).
- Water Tower, in the northwest part of the Saxon Garden, is situated by the ornamental lake surrounded by willows. This classicist water tower in the shape of a Roman monopteros was modelled on the Temple of Vesta in Tivoli. It was designed in 1852 by the architect Henryk Marconi.
- Summer Theatre, a popular summer variéte theatre, existed between 1870 and 1939. It was under Stanisław Moniuszko's "rule" at the Teatr Wielki that the wooden Summer Theatre was built in the Saxon Garden, between the Water Tower building and the Blue Palace by Aleksander Zabierzowski. From then on, summer performances from the Warsaw theatres were shown there every year. At the time, the Summer Theatre could seat an audience of 1,065. Helena Modjeska and Pola Negri made several appearance there. The theatre burned in September 1939 following a direct hit by an incendiary bomb and was never restored.
- Palm House, modeled after Victorian glass and iron structures in England, was built in 1894. It was created specifically for the exotic palms being collected and introduced to Europe in the 19th century. The elegant design, with its unobstructed space for the spreading crowns of the tall palms, was a perfect marriage of form and function. The structure was destroyed during the Warsaw Uprising and Planned destruction of Warsaw and was never restored.
- The Monument dedicated to Maria Konopnicka, famous Polish poet and writer mainly for children and youth, was unveiled in 1965.
- The Stefan Starzyński Monument, statue of city mayor, and leader of the defence efforcts during the Siege of Warsaw in 1939, was added in 1981, and removed in 2008

== See also ==
- Saxon Palace (Pałac Saski)
