= Joachim Daniel von Jauch =

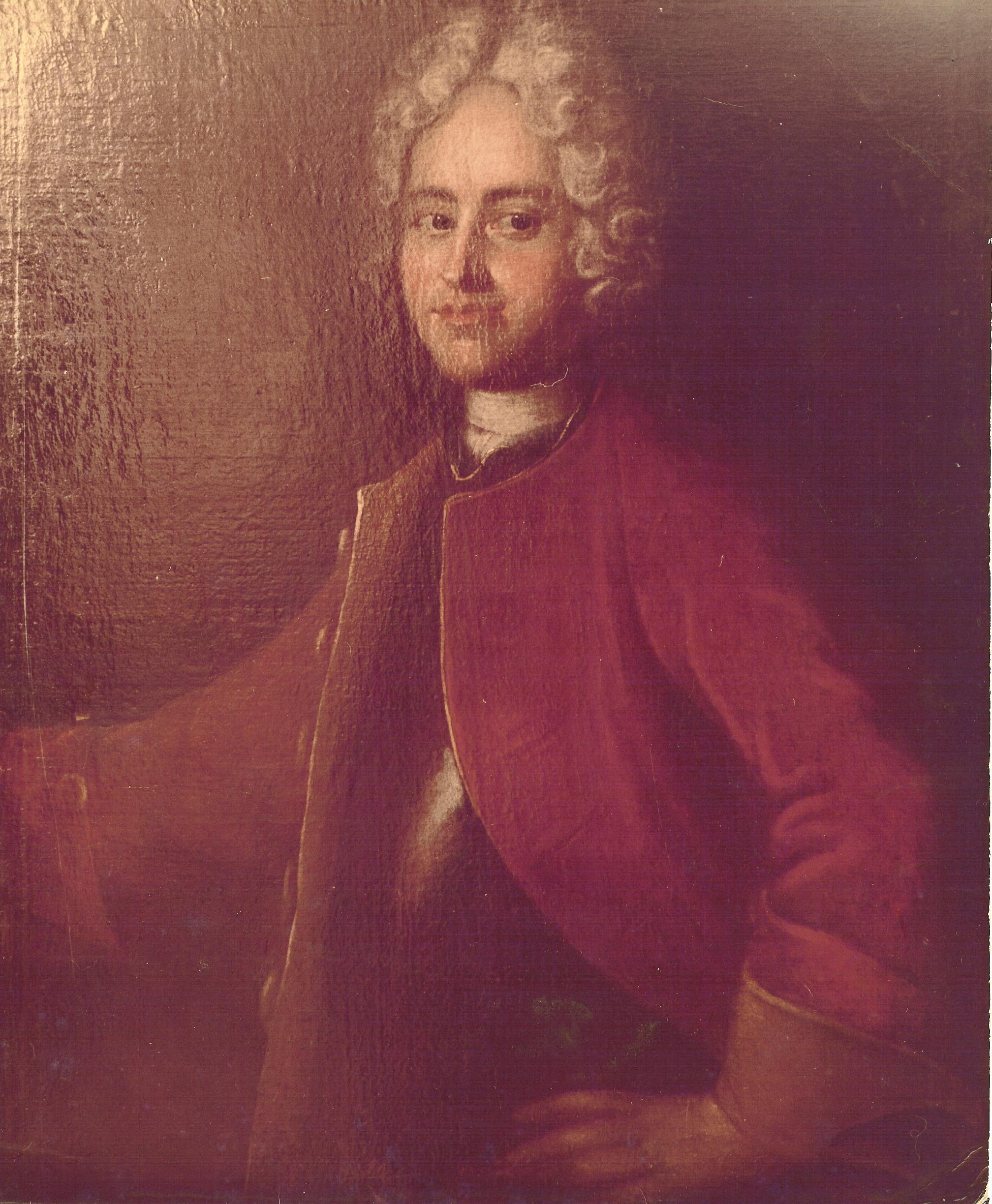
General Joachim Daniel von Jauch (about 1720)

Joachim Daniel von Jauch (22 March 1688 – 3 May 1754) was a German-born architect who supervised the baroque development of Warsaw in Poland.

== Early life and work ==
Joachim Daniel von Jauch was born into the Jauch family in Güstrow, Germany on 22 March 1688 as the youngest of fourteen children. Until 1704 von Jauch undertook military service for the States-General of the Netherlands and served under Kings Augustus II and Augustus III of Poland in the Saxon as well as the Polish armies. He was elevated to Electoral Saxon Lieutenant (1705), Electoral Saxon Captain in the engineer corps (1714), Royal Polish captain in the Royal Polish artillery regiment (1717) and Royal Polish Major and Electoral Saxon Major (both 1720). Meanwhile, he was also a civilian engineer and baroque architect for the Kings. He was appointed inspector for the street lighting of the City of Dresden in 1705 and authorized representative for Poland of the king in architectural matters (1715). In 1720 von Jauch married Eva Maria Münnich, said to be the daughter of Burkhard Christoph von Münnich, his predecessor as superintendent of the Saxon building authority.

== Architectural career ==
Joachim Daniel von Jauch was appointed superintendent of the Saxonian building authority in Poland (1721) and the following year bought land in the Solec quarter which was autonomous, and not subject to the City of Warsaw, where he then erected the Palais Jauch. He was commissioned to renovate several castle halls at the Royal Castle, Warsaw (1722–23). Between 1724-1730 he modified the Ujazdow Palace and erected the alley of the Ujazdow Palace in Warsaw. He was responsible for the 1726 rebuilding of the 'Blue Palace' at the Saxon Garden and the design of the hall of the Polish parliament in the Sapieha Palace. In 1727 he prepared a draft for the church of the Boni Fratelli at Warsaw and in 1729 began work to build the Casimirs Barracks in Warsaw. von Jauch was ennobled (1730) after which in 1731 he added a large festival room to his palais at Solec where he received the King.

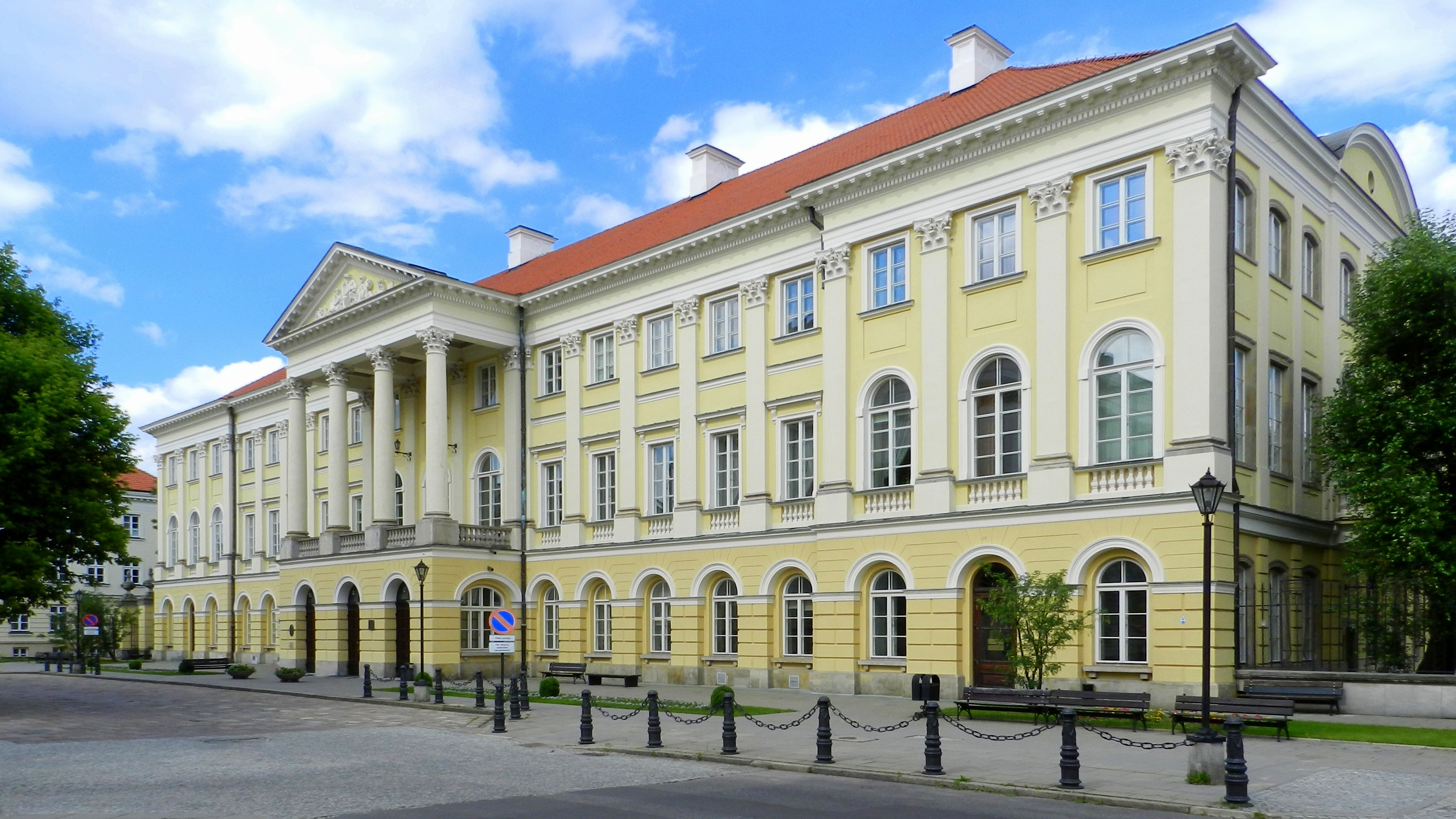
The Kazimierzowski Palace, rebuilt to a rococo design with co-architect Johann Sigmund Deybel (1737-39)

The golden years of his architectural career were from 1735 on with the erection of the Lubomirski Palace and construction of the chapel of the Saxon Palace (both 1735) the erection of the theater in the royal palace at Warsaw (1736), the building of the crypt for King August II of Poland in the Capuchin Church at Warsaw (1736–1738) leading to his receipt of the title of governor of the Saxonian building authority in Poland (1736). This work was followed by a commission to rebuild the Kazimierzowski Palace to a rococo design with co-architect Johann Sigmund Deybel (1737–39), the 1738 erection of postal buildings (Postpalais) at Dąbrowa and Boguszyce in Poland, on the royal road between Dresden and Warsaw, and in 1745 construction of the portal of the Saxon Palace.

In his parallel military career, he rose to Electoral Saxonian Lieutenant-Colonel (1725), Royal Polish Lieutenant-Colonel (1729) and Royal Polish Colonel (1736).

Joachim Daniel von Jauch died in Warsaw on 3 May 1754. Between 1754 and 1759 the Brühl Palace, Warsaw was rebuilt to designs by von Jauch and Johann Friedrich Knöbel.
