= Saxon Palace =

- Pałac Saski
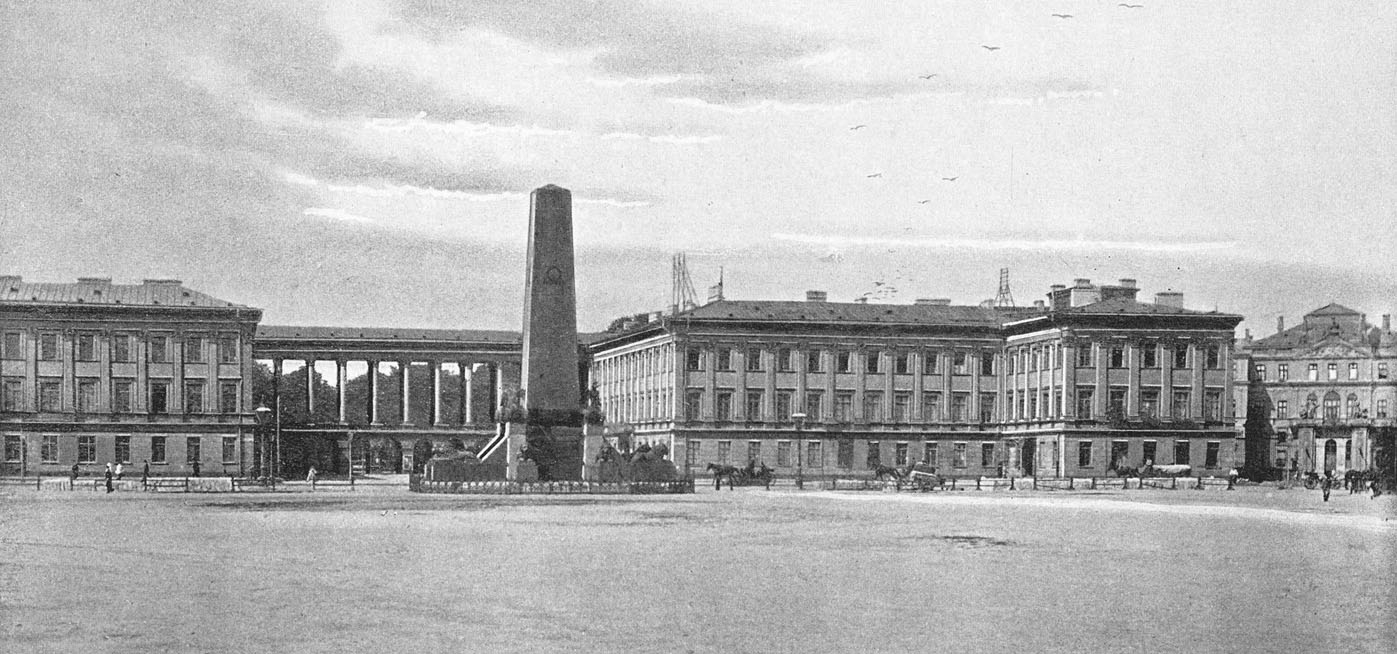
- Saxon Palace with the Ossoliński-Brühl Palace to the right (around 1890)
- Interactive map of the Saxon Palace area

General information
- Architectural style: Neoclassical (1838)
- Location: Warsaw, Poland
- Coordinates: 52°14′28″N 21°00′41″E
- Construction started: 1666
- Renovated: 2030 (in progress)
- Destroyed: 1944

Design and construction
- Architect: Adam Idźkowski (1838)

The Saxon Palace (Polish: pałac Saski w Warszawie) in Warsaw, Poland, was a historic architectural landmark located on Piłsudski Square in the heart of the Polish capital. Originally built in the 17th century as a noble residence, it was later expanded and transformed into a royal palace under the Saxon House of Wettin in the 18th century. The building underwent several modifications over the centuries, and is most famous for its last, 1838 design in the neoclassical style by the Polish architect Adam Idźkowski, with a distinctive colonnade.

The palace played a significant role in Polish history, serving as a military and government headquarters, including housing the Polish General Staff in the interwar period. It was also the site where the German Enigma Cipher was first broken, by Polish cryptologists in 1932. Destroyed by the Germans during the Second World War, only the section of its colonnade which has since 1925 housed the Tomb of the Unknown Soldier, has survived.

Plans for the palace’s reconstruction have been discussed since the post-war period, with various proposals put forward over the decades. In 2021, the Polish government launched an official initiative to rebuild the Saxon Palace, along with the neighboring Brühl Palace and historic tenement houses. A design competition was held in 2023, selecting the Warsaw-based architectural firm WXCA to lead the reconstruction effort. Reconstruction is expected to be completed by 2030.

== History ==
=== A royal residence for the Saxon Kings Augustus II the Strong and his son Augustus III ===
Originally, the site of the Saxon Palace was occupied by the manor house of Tobiasz Morsztyn. After 1661, his brother and heir, Jan Andrzej Morsztyn, constructed a two-story baroque style palace with four towers on the site of the manor and part of the Sigismund III Embankment, which was known as the Morsztyn Palace (Polish: Pałac Morsztynów). In 1713,

In 1713 the Morsztyn Palace was purchased by the first of Poland's two Saxon kings, Augustus II the Strong (reigned in Poland 1697–1706 and 1709–33). The king first had resided in Wilanów Palace, which he had remodeled. The Warsaw Royal Castle, a Renaissance building, seemed too outdated to him. The king expanded and remodeled the palace, now called the Saxon Palace. The works were completed in 1724 and were overseen by Carl Friedrich Pöppelmann and Joachim Daniel von Jauch. The renovated palace became part of the baroque urban development of the Saxon Axis, which extended from Krakowskie Przedmieście to the Mier Barracks.

Starting in 1716, the palace's Theater Hall, along with an amphitheater in the Saxon Garden and the Royal Castle, served as a venue for theatrical performances—Warsaw did not yet have a dedicated theater building at that time. The palace's decorations were designed by Louis de Silvestre.

As part of the expansion of the complex, adjacent noble residences were incorporated. In 1721, the estate of the Sanguszko family, later known as the Brühl Palace, was added. In 1726, the residence of Bishop Teodor Andrzej Potocki was annexed and later transformed into the Blue Palace, intended for Anna Orzelska, the illegitimate daughter of Augustus II the Strong. The reconstruction of the palace and the development of the Saxon Axis took place in three phases: the first from 1713 to the early 1720s, the second until the death of Augustus II in 1733 (when financial and political constraints significantly slowed construction), and the final phase in the 1730s and 1740s, when his son king Augustus III completed the redevelopment of the complex (amongst other works two wings were added in 1748).

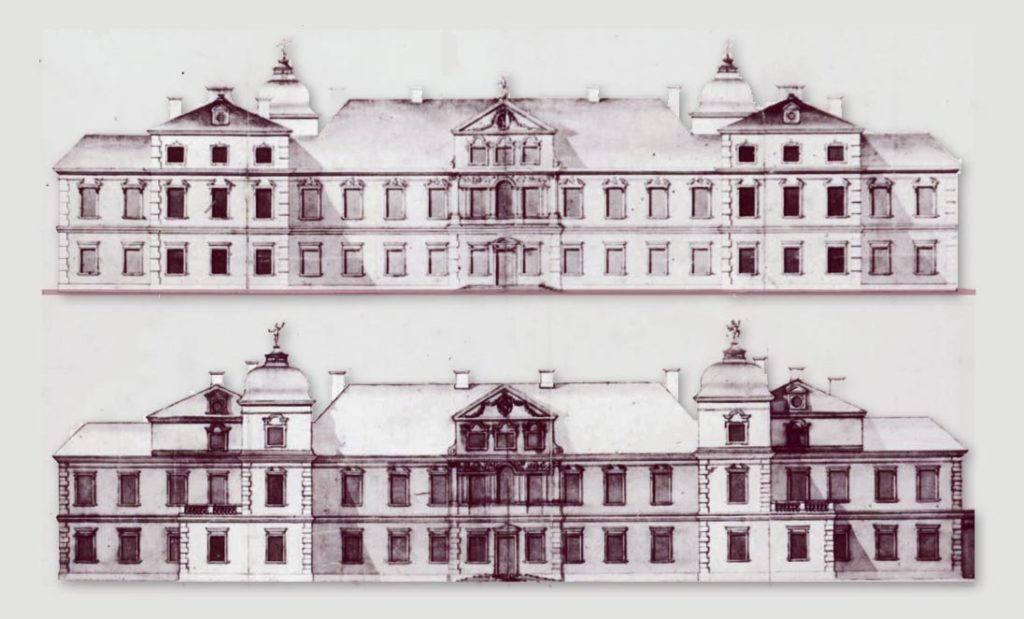
The Morsztyn Palace

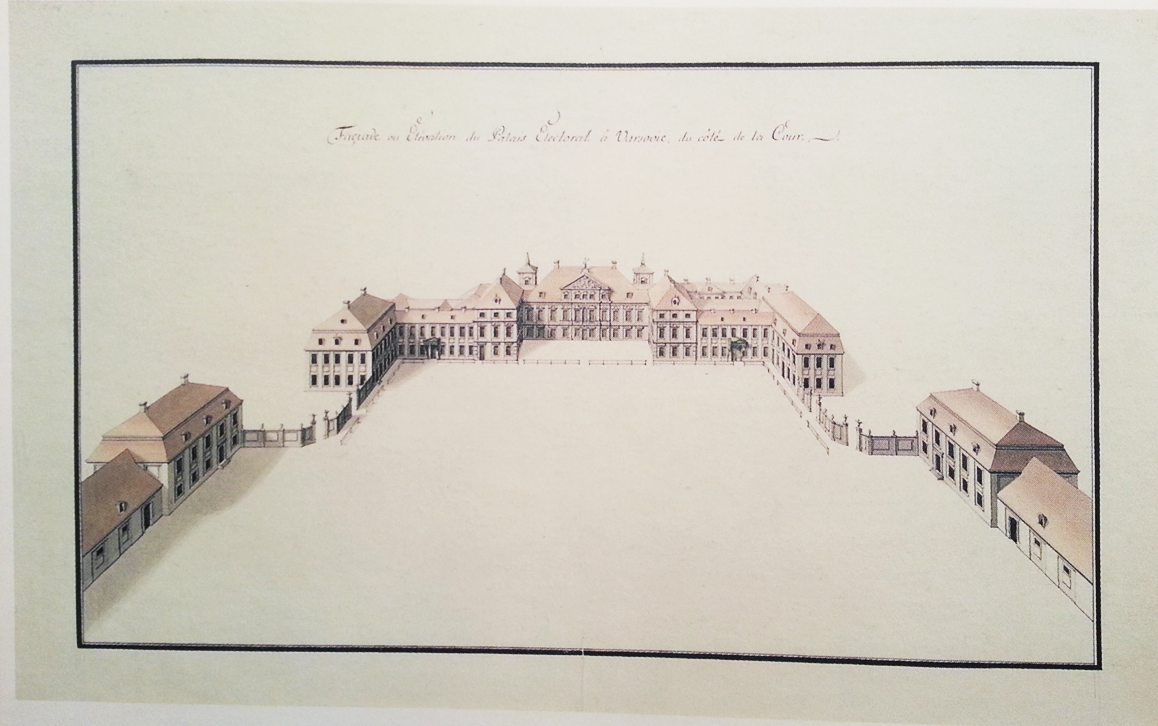
The entrance front of the Saxon Palace in the 18th century

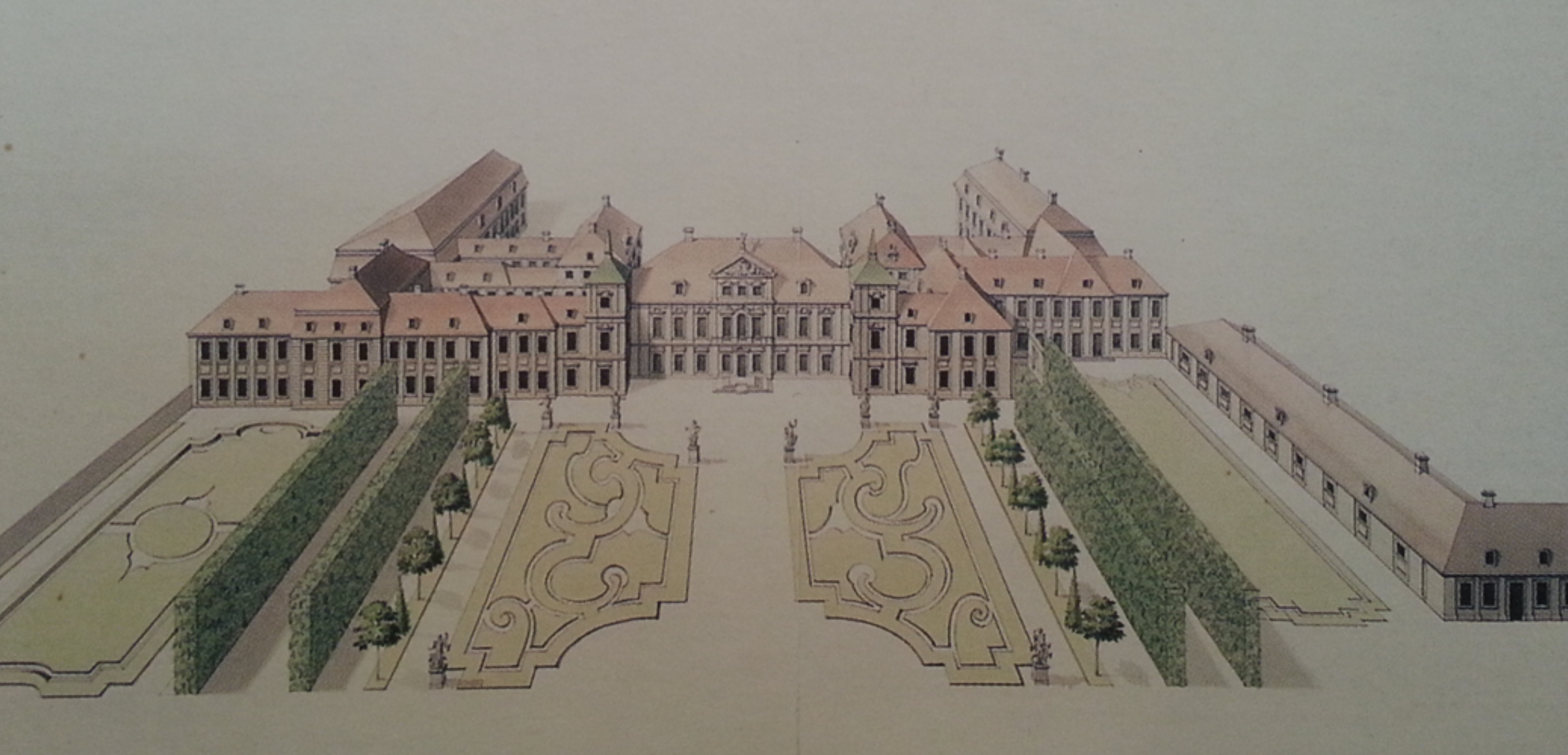
The garden front of the Saxon Palace in the 18th century

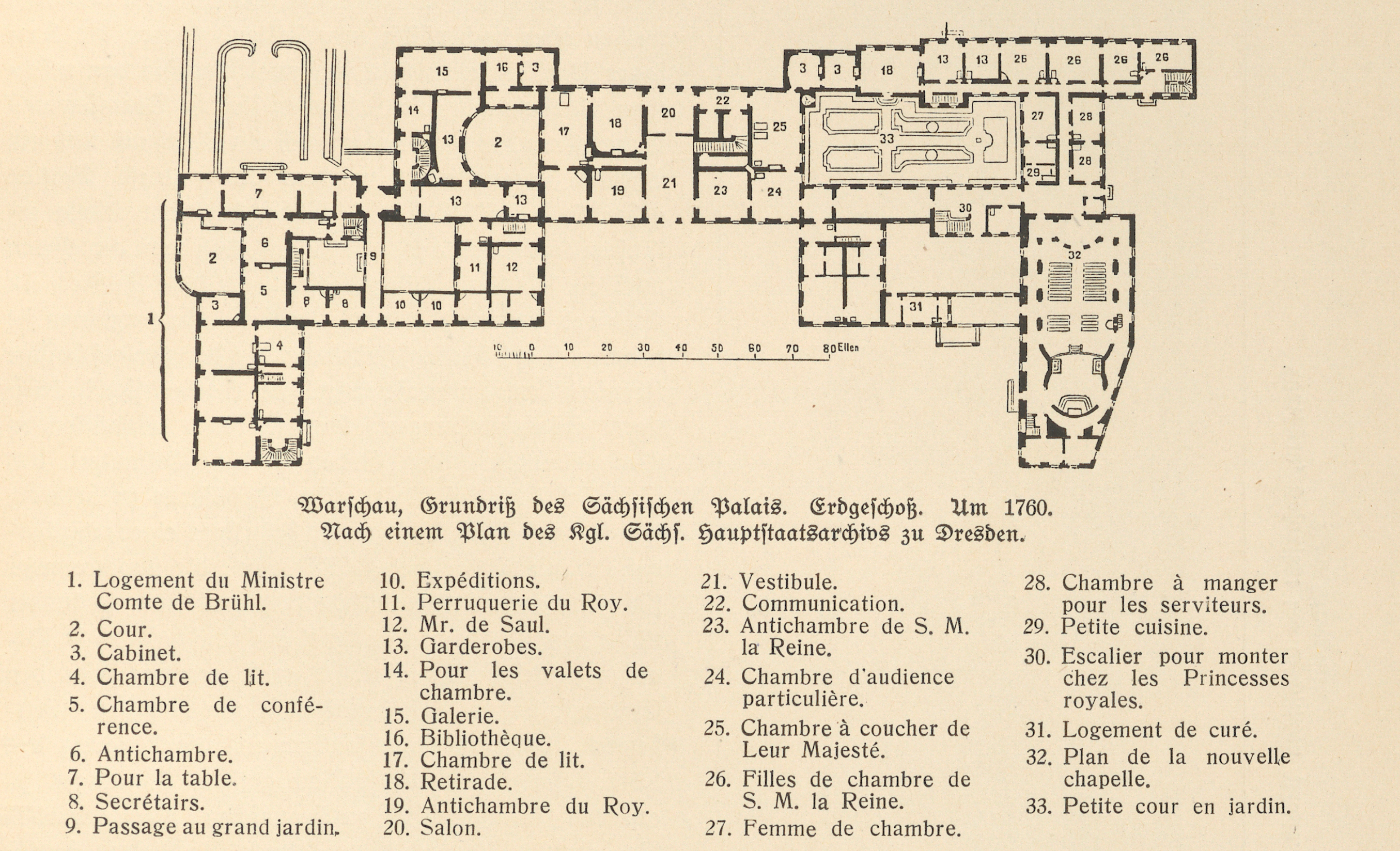
Interior plan (1760)

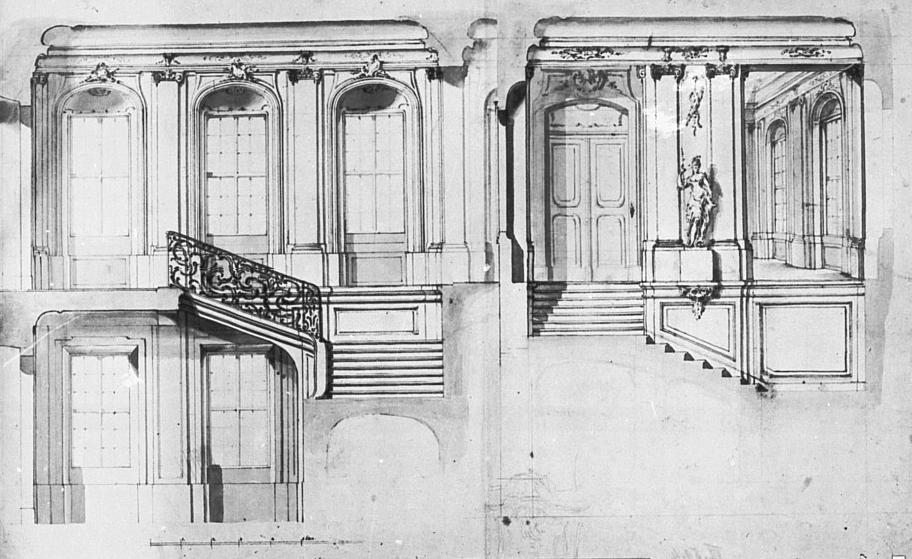
Staircase hall

=== Second half of the 18th century and early 19th century: Decline ===
After the death of Augustus III of Saxony in 1763, the palace lost its status as a royal residence and fell into decline. However, it remained in the possession of successive Saxon electors, who rented out its rooms for offices and apartments.

On 17 April 1794, during the Warsaw Uprising, one of the two largest battles in the capital took place in front of the eastern side of the Saxon Palace. The insurgents repelled an attack by a strong column of Russian troops attempting to relieve General Iosif Igelström, the commander-in-chief of the Russian army, who was besieged in a palace on Miodowa Street.

From 1804, the Saxon Palace housed the Warsaw Lyceum. In the autumn of 1810, Nicolas Chopin and his wife Justyna, along with their children Ludwika and Frédéric, moved into the second floor of the palace’s right wing. On 1 October 1810, Frédéric Chopin’s father began working as a French language teacher at the Warsaw Lyceum. The Chopin family lived in the Saxon Palace until 1817.

Between 1808 and 1816, the palace remained the property of the kings of Saxony. However, after the Congress of Vienna forced king Frederick Augustus I to renounce his title as Duke of Warsaw, the palace was sold to the government of the Kingdom of Poland.

In 1817, attempts were made to change the character of the building and its surrounding landscape. Polish architect Piotr Aigner proposed a partial reconstruction of the palace, including the addition of an avenue of one hundred columns along the Saxon Axis. However, this plan was never realized, as the then viceroy, Józef Zajączek, abandoned the project due to its high costs.

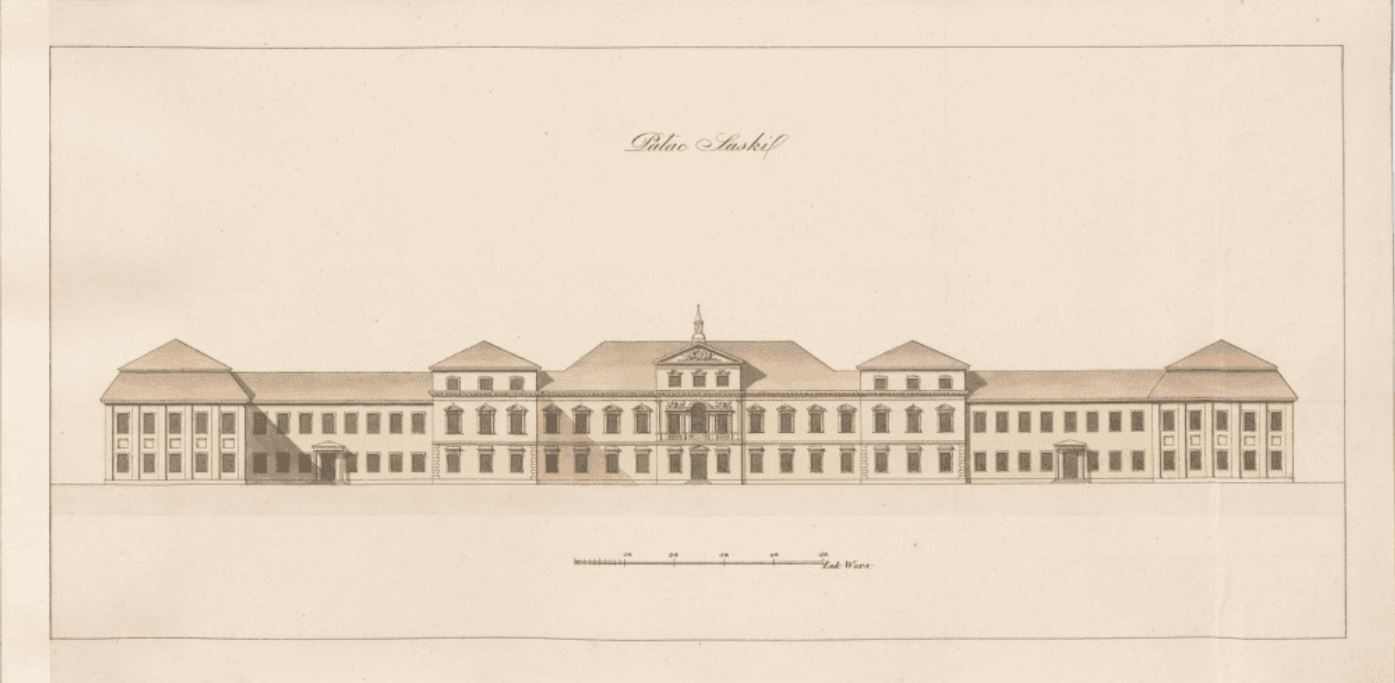
The Saxon Palace around 1800

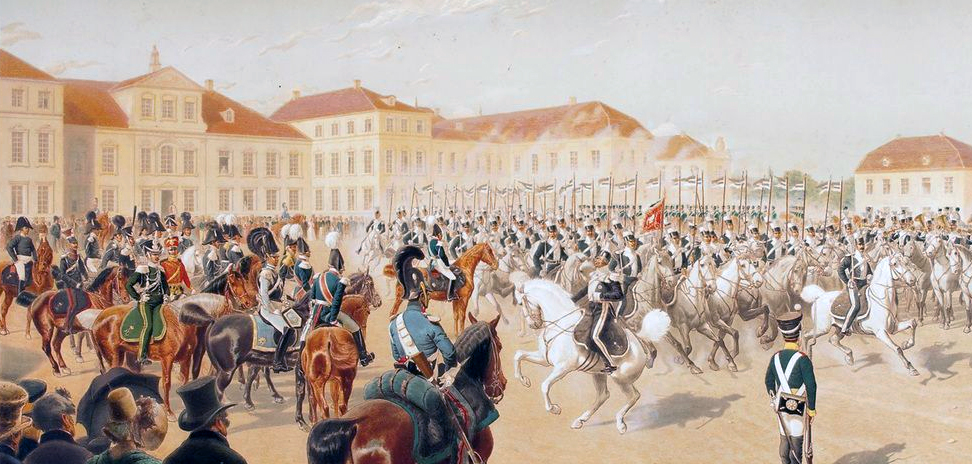
A military parade in front of the Saxon Palace

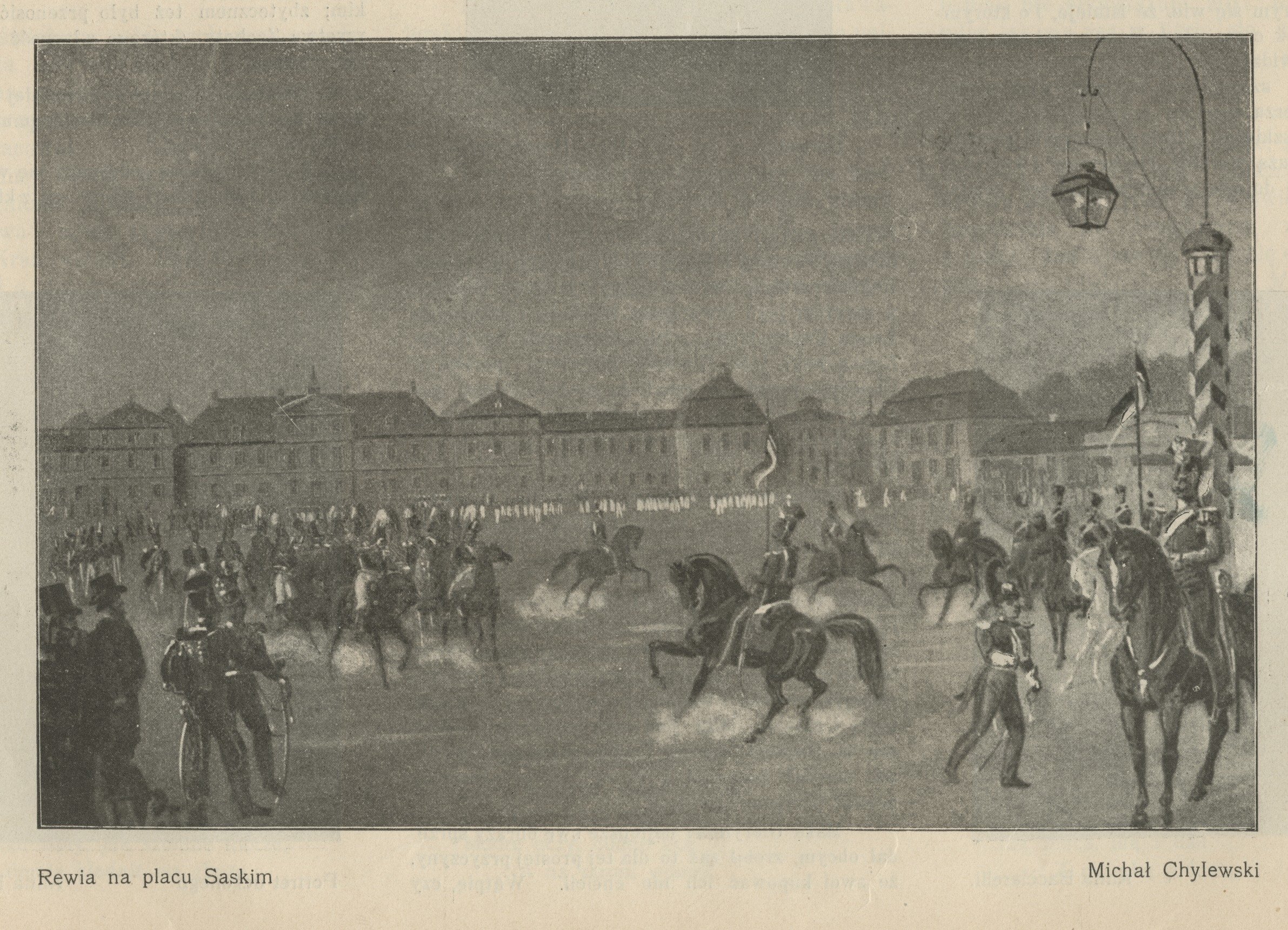
Soldiers in front of the Saxon Palace

=== 19th century: Reconstruction and Military Use ===
In 1837, Adam Idźkowski, a master of construction and surveying as well as a graduate of the Fine Arts Department of the University of Warsaw, was commissioned to design the reconstruction of the Saxon Palace by its new owner, merchant Ivan Skwarcov, who had purchased the building from the government for 115,200 złoty. Other architects, including Enrico Marconi and Antonio Corazzi, also participated in the competition for the palace’s redesign. Although Marconi’s project won, viceroy Ivan Paskevich rejected it without justification and approved Idźkowski’s design instead.

Between 1839 and 1842, the palace was rebuilt in a neoclassical style based on Idźkowski’s plans. The central part of the building was demolished and replaced with a Corinthian colonnade. The two side wings were also modified, incorporating pilasters that complemented the style of the colonnade. The reconstructed palace retained the name of the original building.

In November 1841, a monument designed by Antonio Corazzi was unveiled in front of the palace, commemorating seven Polish loyalist officers who were killed on 29 November 1830, by insurgents for refusing to join the uprising. Between 1894 and 1912, the monumental Alexander Nevsky Cathedral, featuring a 70-meter-high bell tower facing Królewska Street, was built in the square. Due to the construction of the cathedral, the loyalist officers’ monument was relocated to Zielony Square.

In 1864, Ivan Skwarcov’s heirs sold the palace to the military authorities. Until 1915, the building was occupied by the army of the Russian Empire and served as the headquarters of the Command of the Third Warsaw Military District.

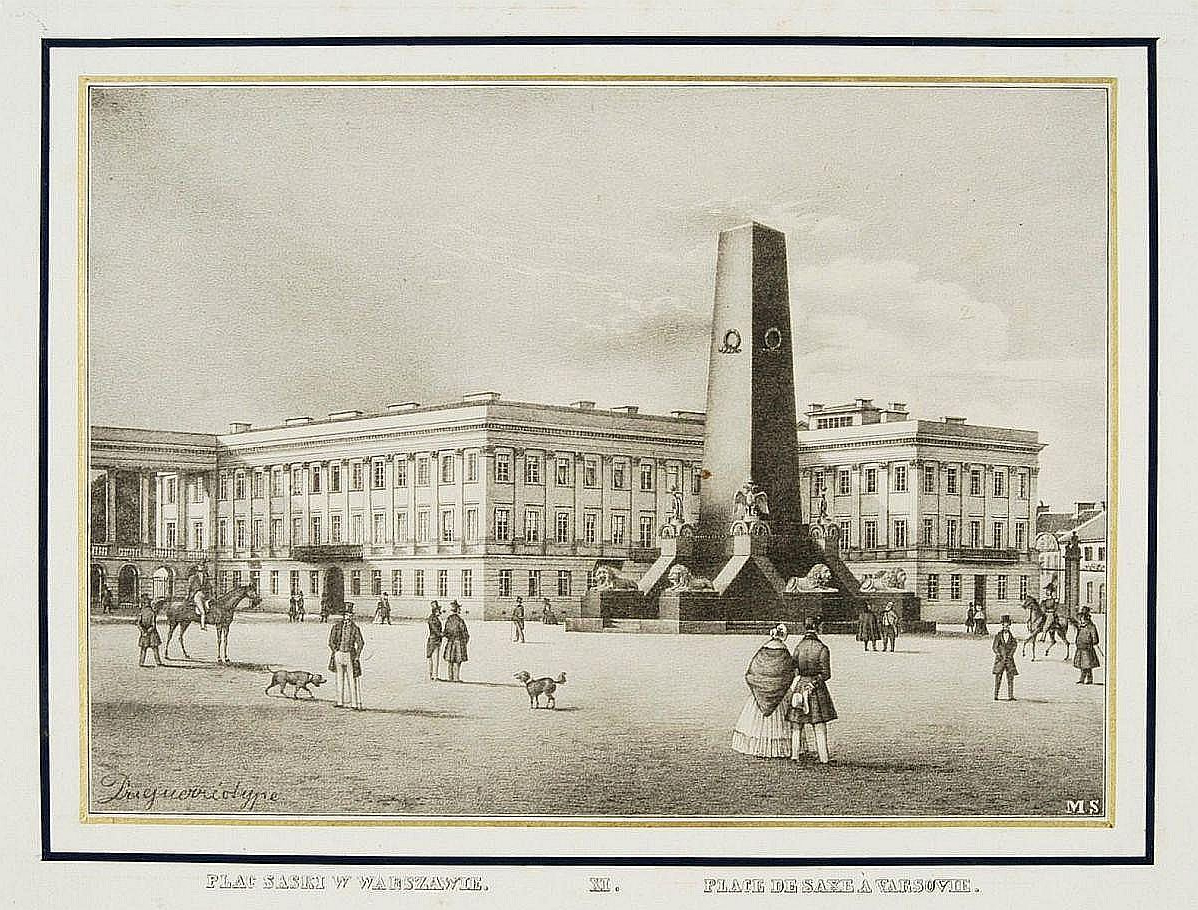
The palace with in front the Monument of Seven Generals (polish loyalists during November uprising 1830)

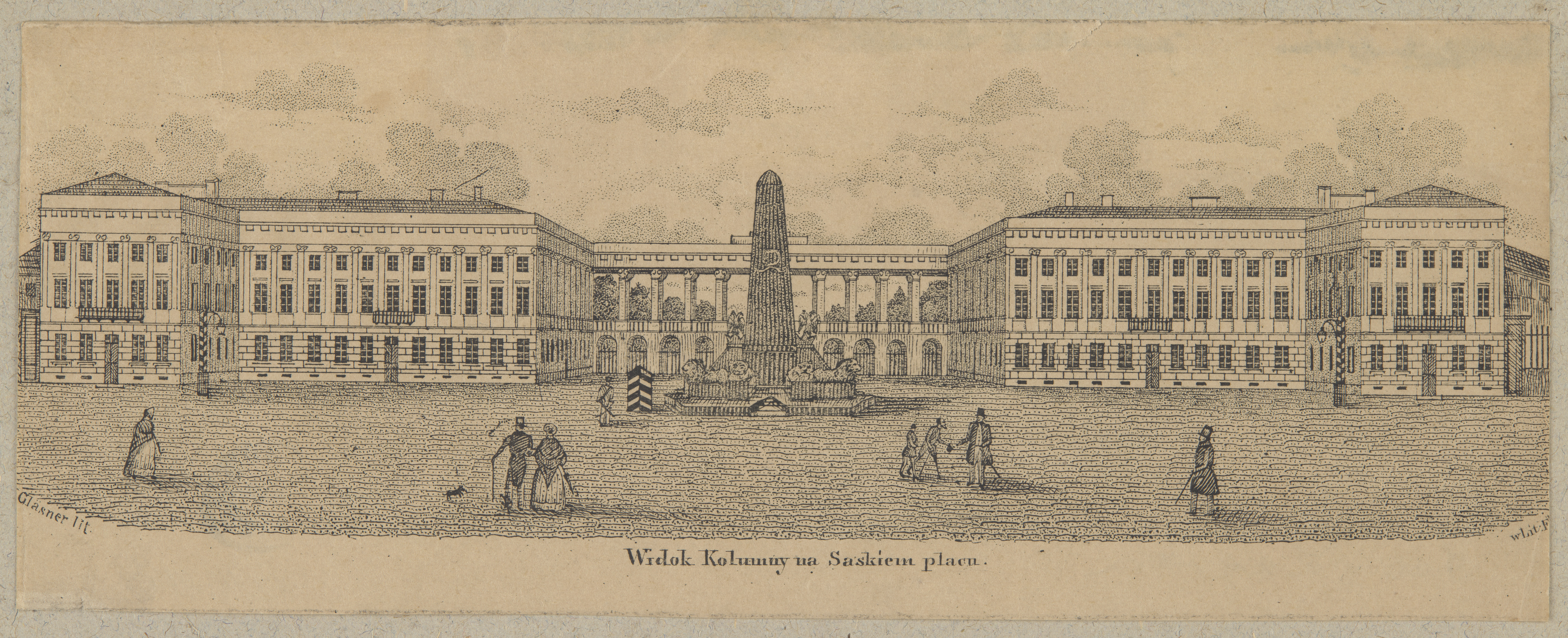
The Saxon Palace in the late 19th century

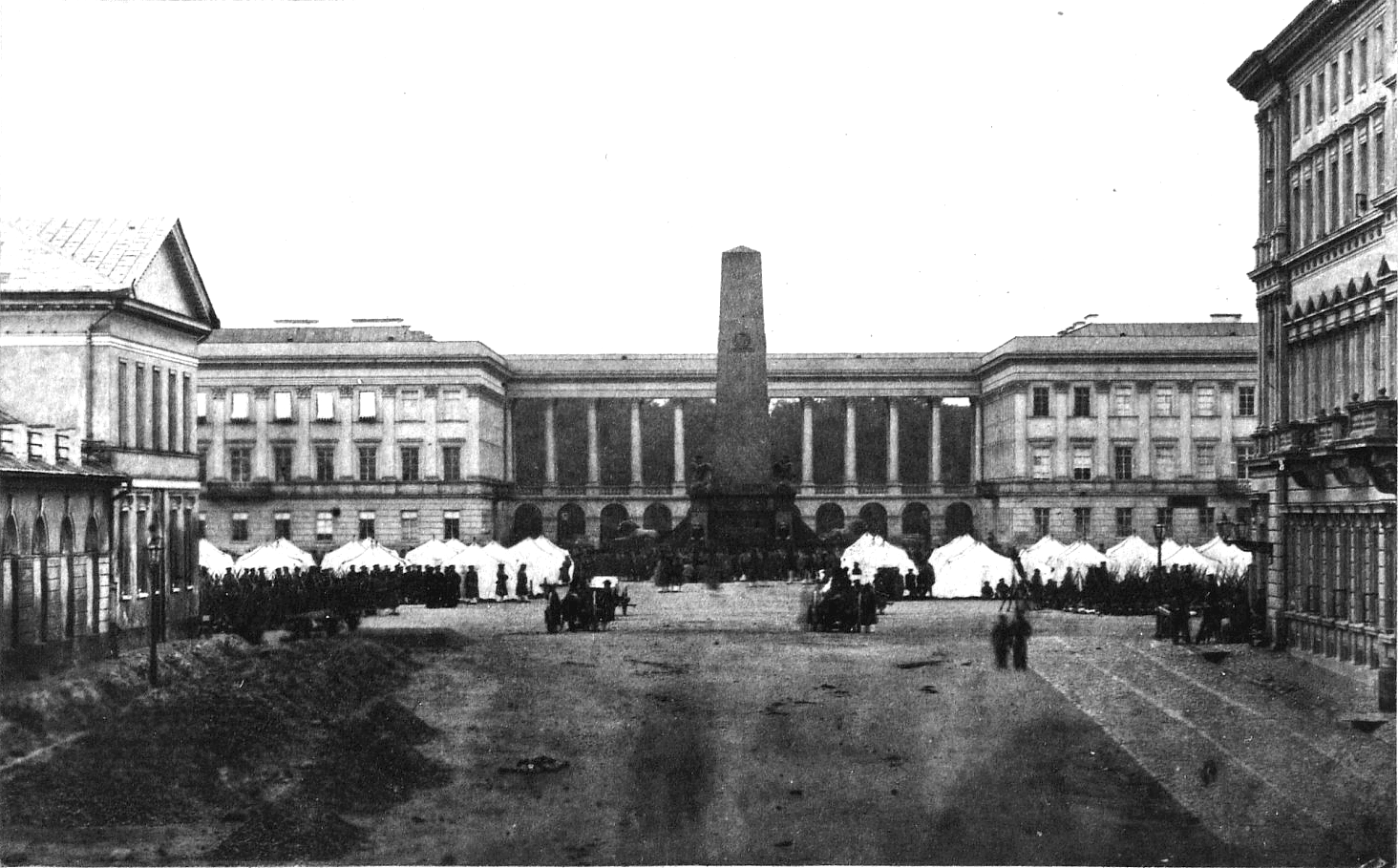
Bivouac of the Russian Army on the Saxon Square (1861)

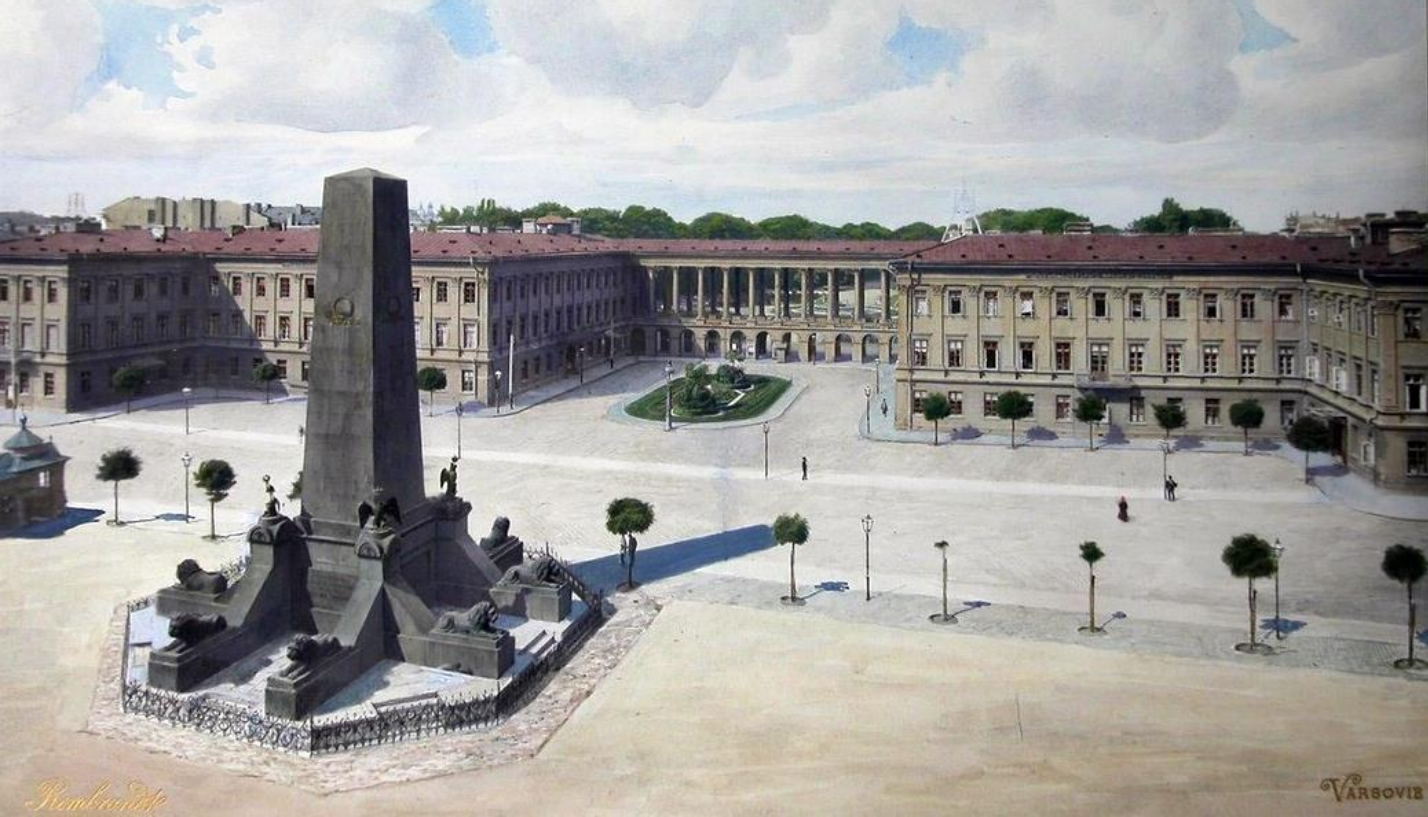
The Saxon Palace and the square before 1894

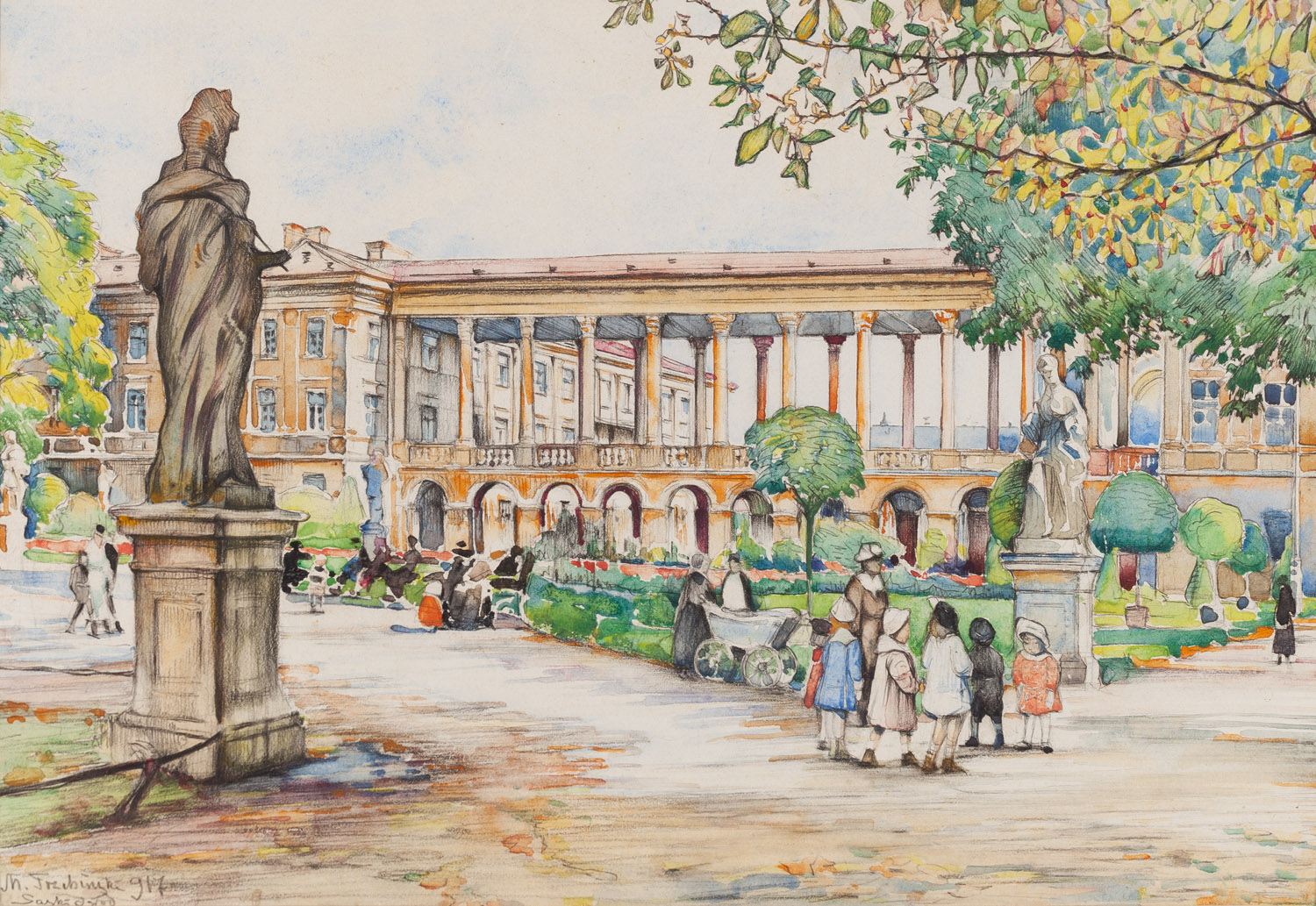
The palace seen from the Saxon Garden (1917)

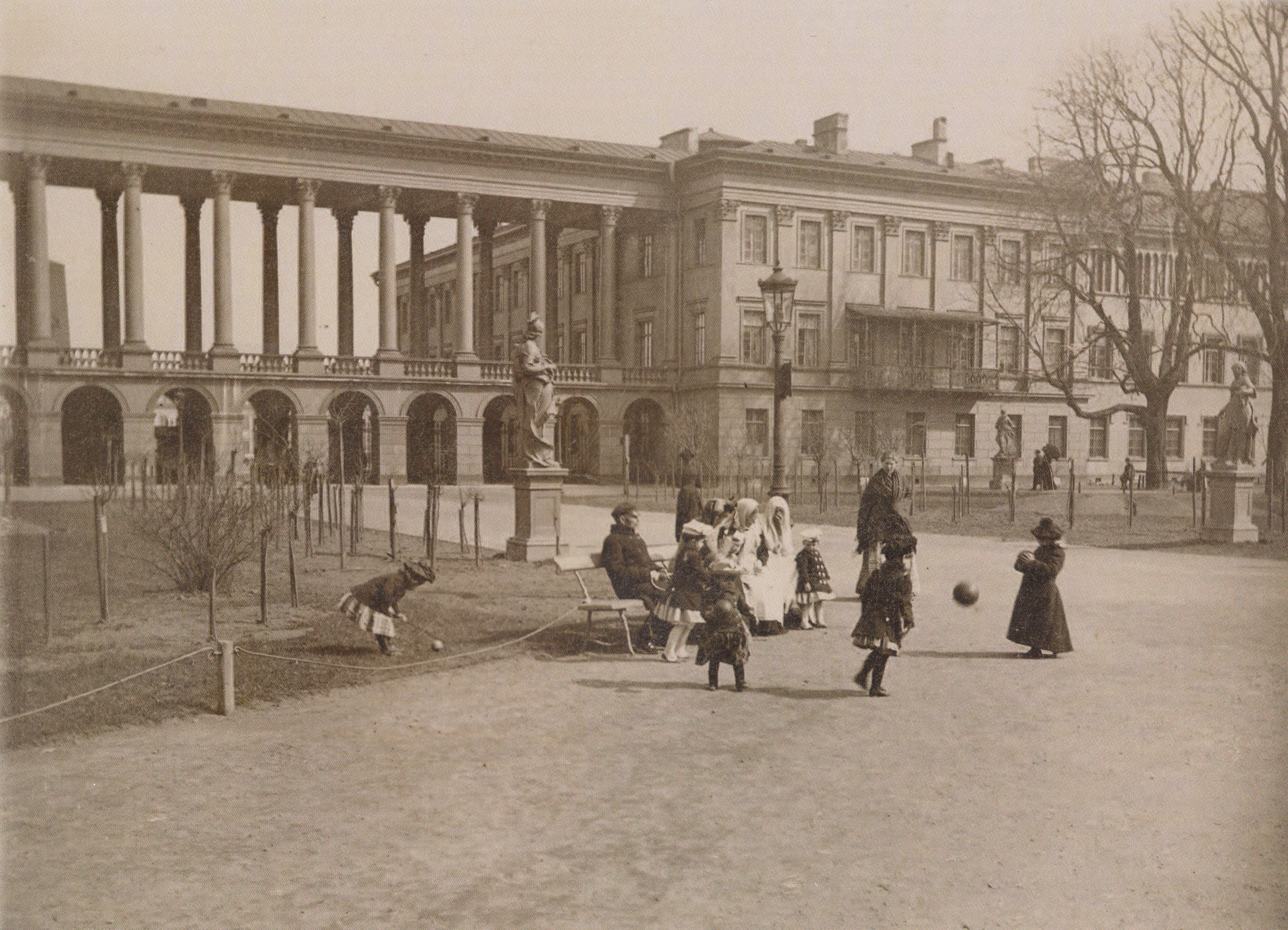
The palace colonnade seen from the Saxon Garden (1895)

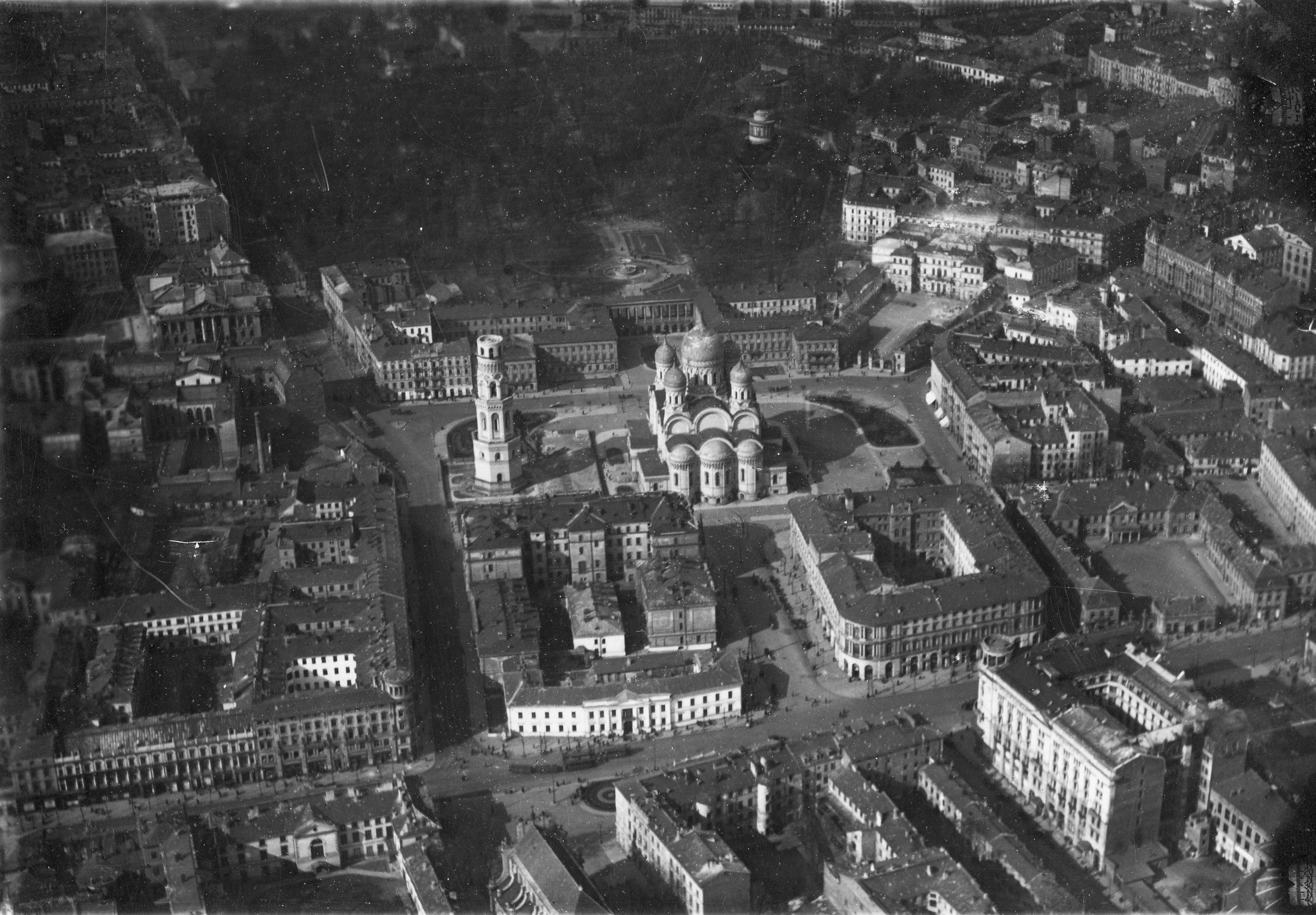
The palace seen from the air with the Alexander Nevsky Cathedral in front of it (1919)

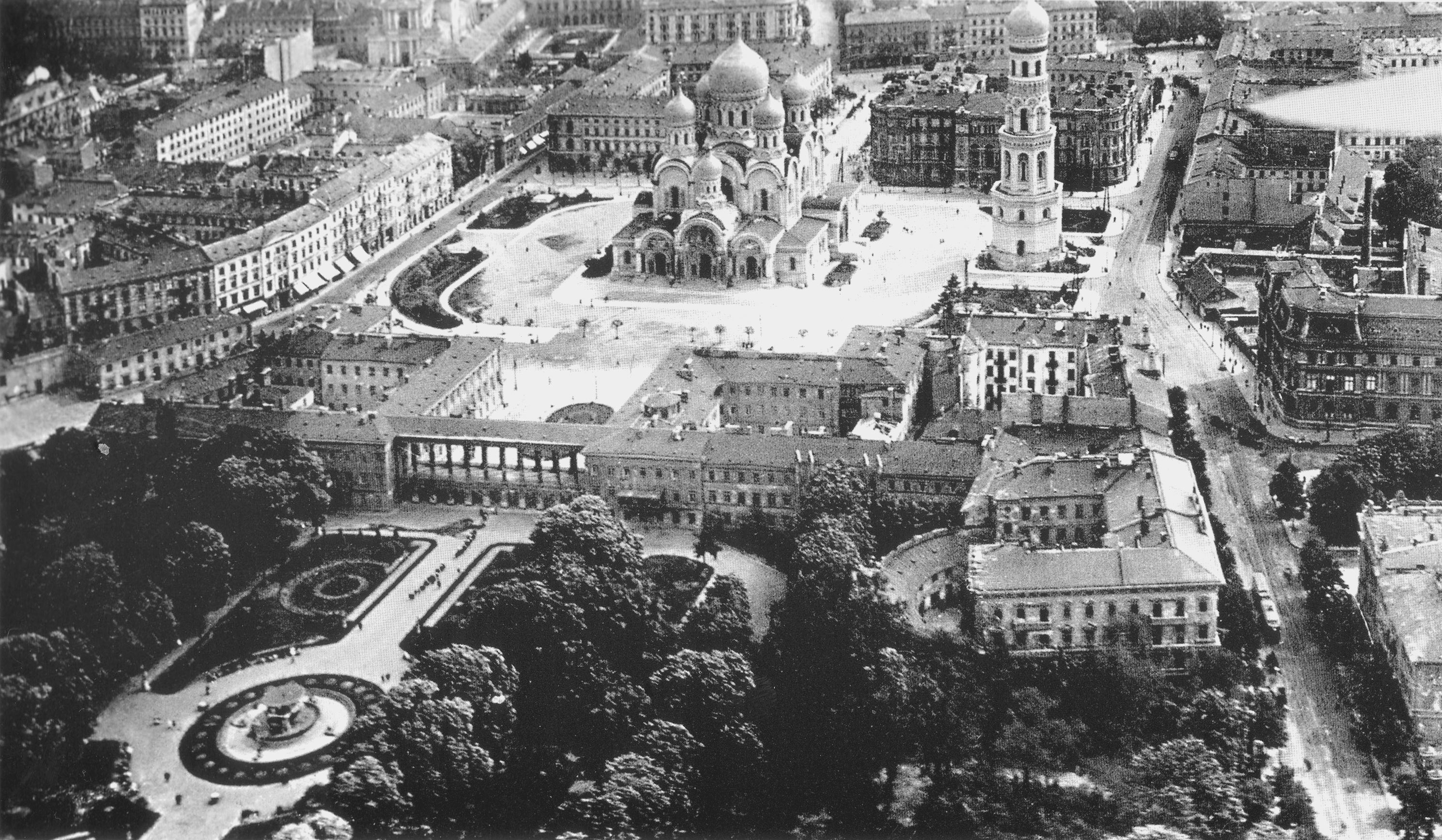
The garden front of the palace seen from air (1919)

=== Interbellum: Independence, War and Destruction ===
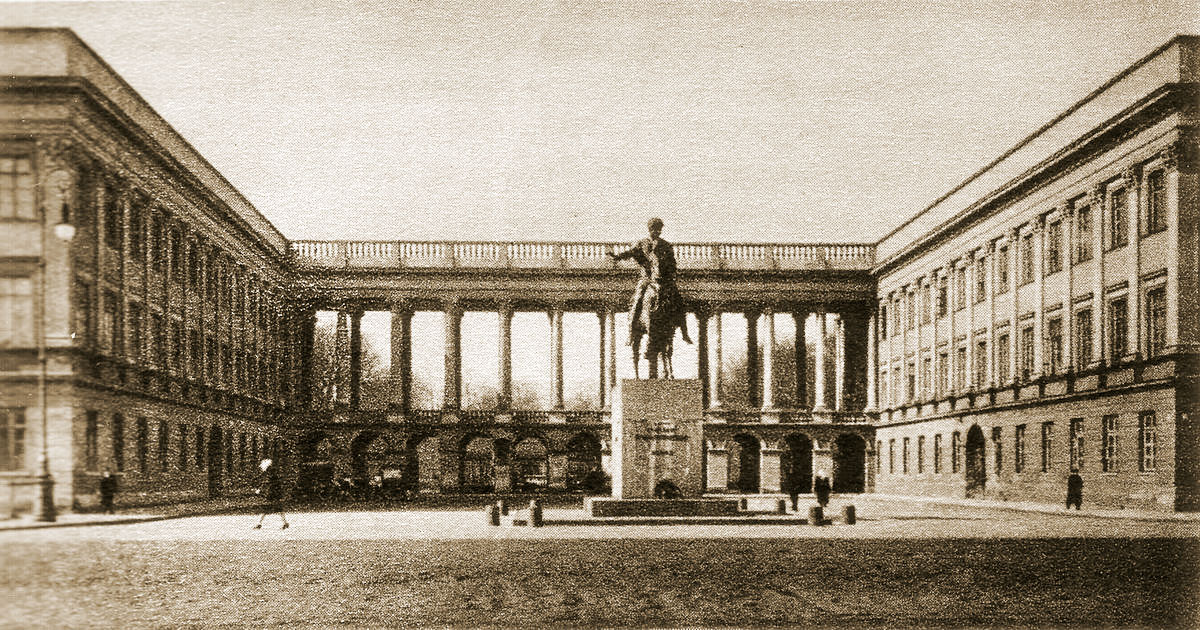
Saxon Palace, seen from Saxon Square. Before the arcade housing the Tomb of the Unknown Soldier stands Thorvaldsen's equestrian statue of Prince Józef Poniatowski (after World War II, relocated to Krakowskie Przedmieście, in front of the Presidential Palace).

After World War I, Poland regained independence in 1918, and the Saxon Palace became the seat of the Polish General Staff. It also housed a team led by Lieutenant Colonel Jan Kowalewski, whose work in breaking Bolshevik ciphers contributed to Poland’s victory over the Red Army in the 1920 war.

In 1923, a monument to Prince Józef Poniatowski was placed in front of the building facing Saxon Square. Two years later, the palace’s arcade were chosen as the site for the Tomb of the Unknown Soldier, which was unveiled on 2 November 1925. The Palace continued to be sandwiched between the Saxon Garden, to its rear, and the Saxon Square in front (which would be renamed Piłsudski Square after the Marshal's death in 1935).

Between 1930 and 1937, the palace housed the Cipher Bureau. In December 1932, three mathematicians working there—Marian Rejewski, Jerzy Różycki, and Henryk Zygalski—successfully broke the code of the German Enigma machine cipher within the building’s walls, before the General Staff Cipher Bureau German section's 1937 move to new, specially designed quarters near Pyry in the Kabaty Woods south of Warsaw. In 1938, the T. Czosnowski & Co. Construction Office carried out a thorough renovation of the palace’s facade.

After the outbreak of World War II, following the capitulation of Warsaw in September 1939, the Wehrmacht took control of the palace. Two months after the Warsaw Uprising, between 27 and 29 December 1944, the Saxon Palace was blown up by the Germans as part of their planned destruction of Warsaw. Only a fragment of the arcades housing the Tomb of the Unknown Soldier survived.

According to some theories, this section remained intact because a German soldier involved in the demolition intentionally refrained from placing dynamite in the pre-prepared holes out of respect for the unknown Polish soldier buried there.

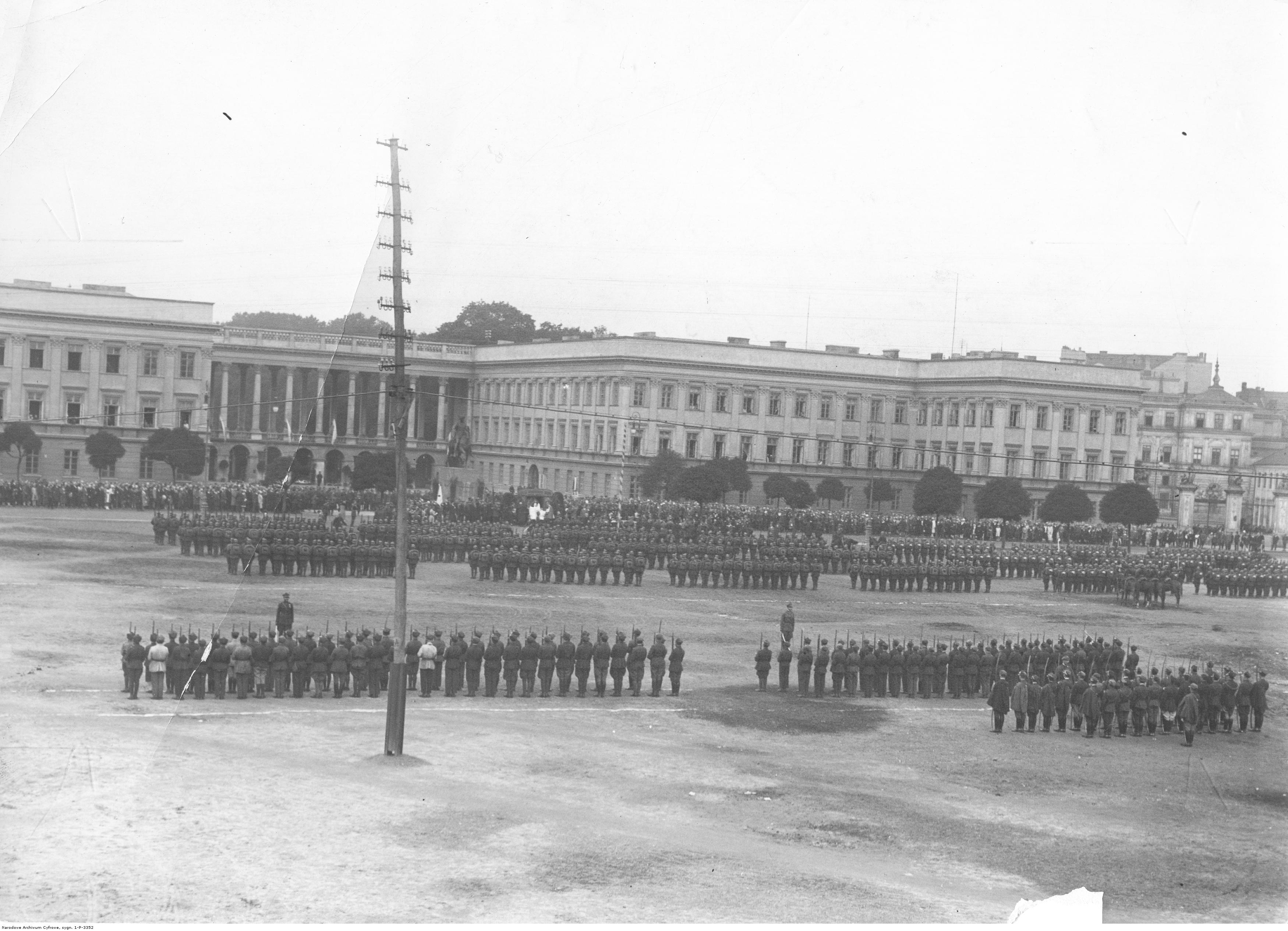
Warsaw celebration of anniversary of Battle of Warsaw (1920), mischievously dubbed by political opponents as the "Miracle on the Vistula"

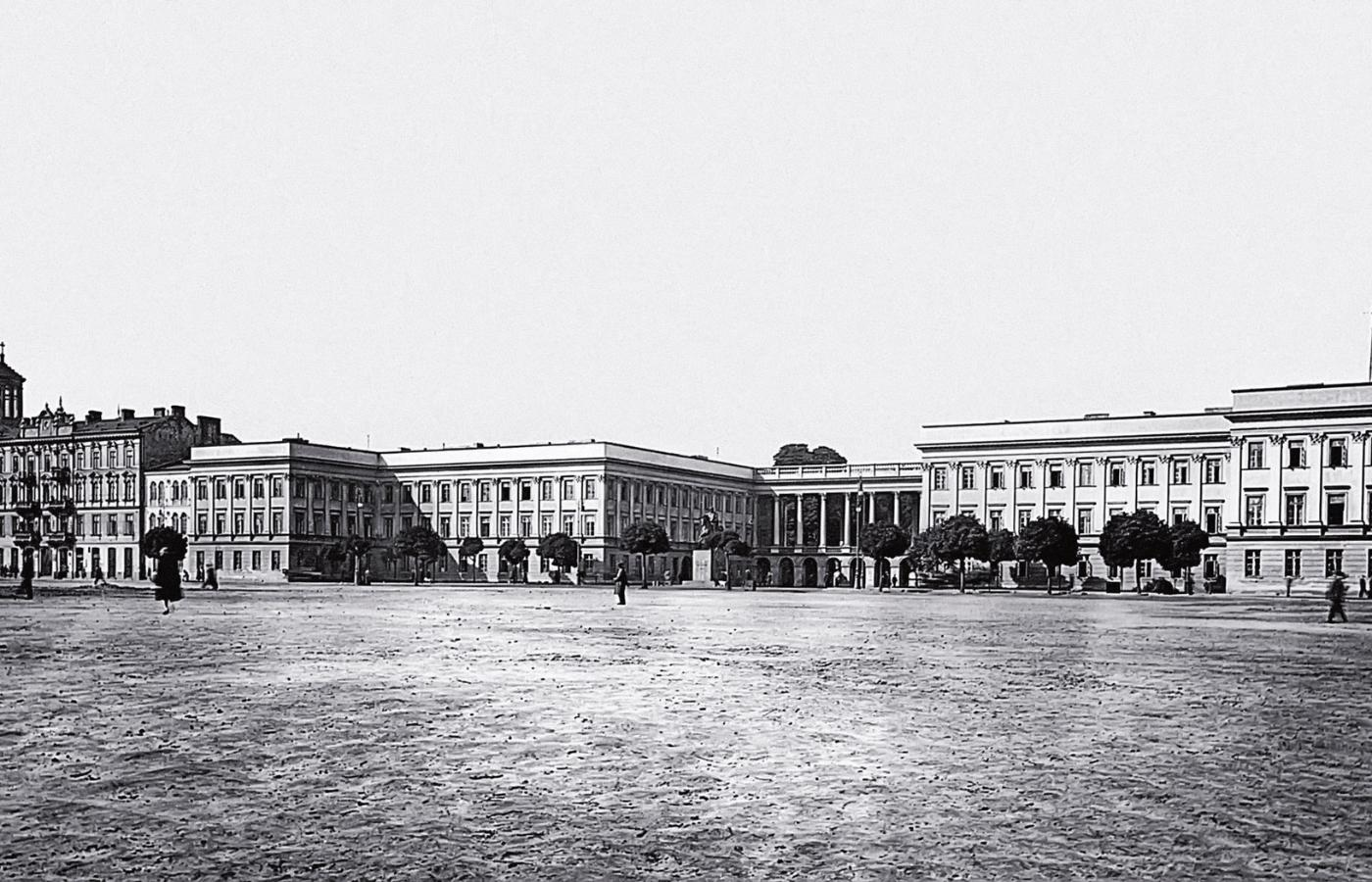
Piłsudski Square and Saxon Palace

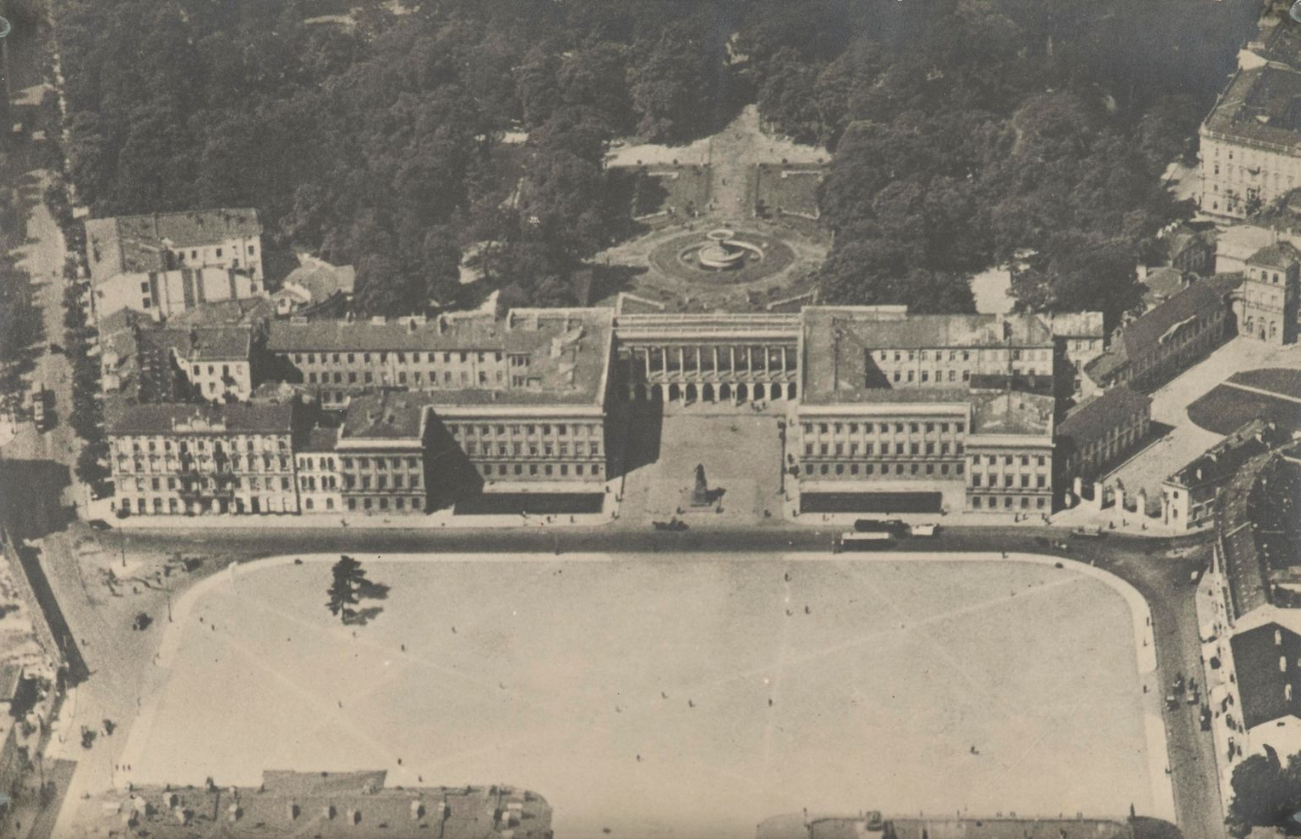
Aerial view of Saxon Palace

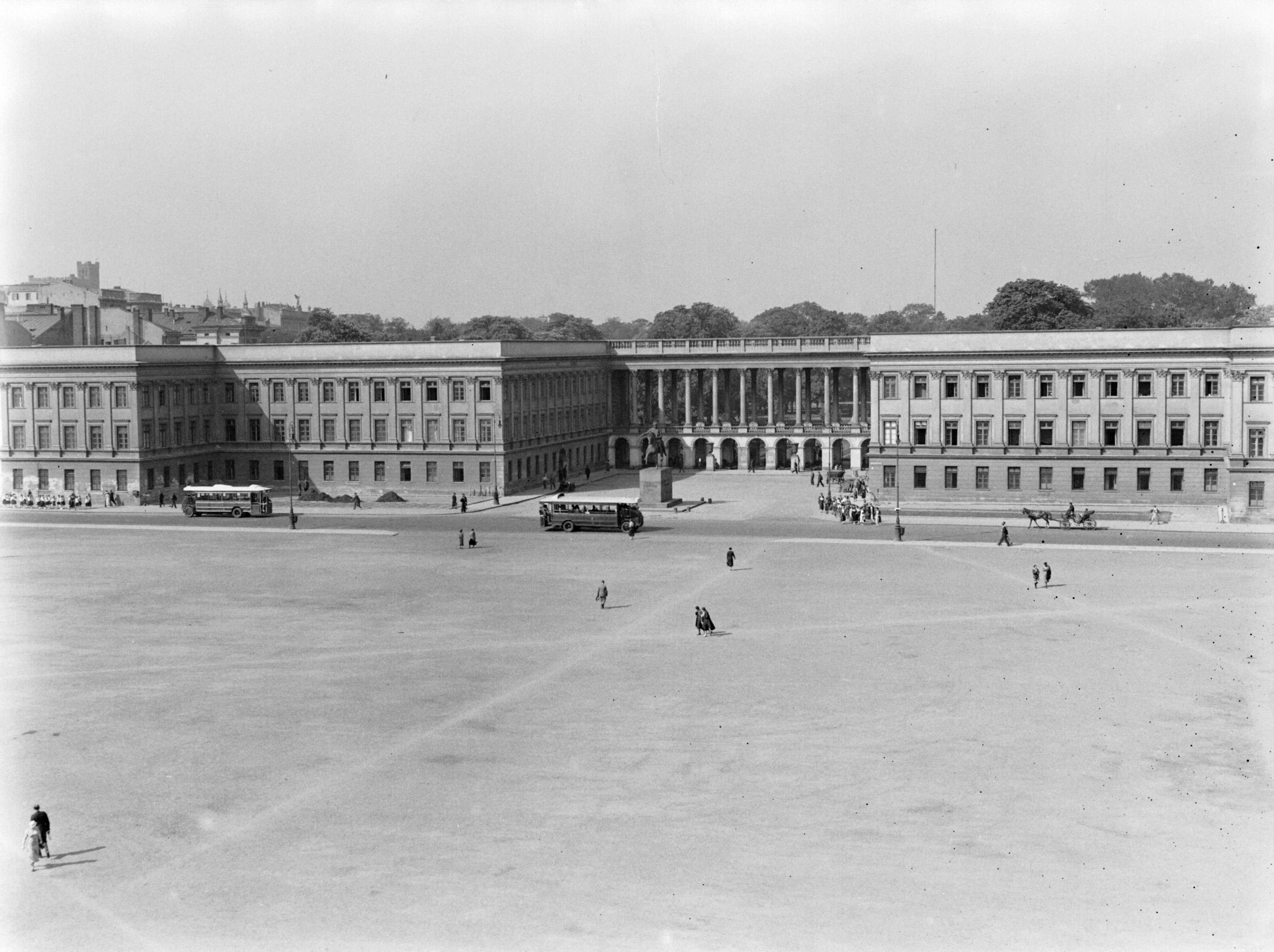
Saxon Palace viewed from Saxon Square (1934)

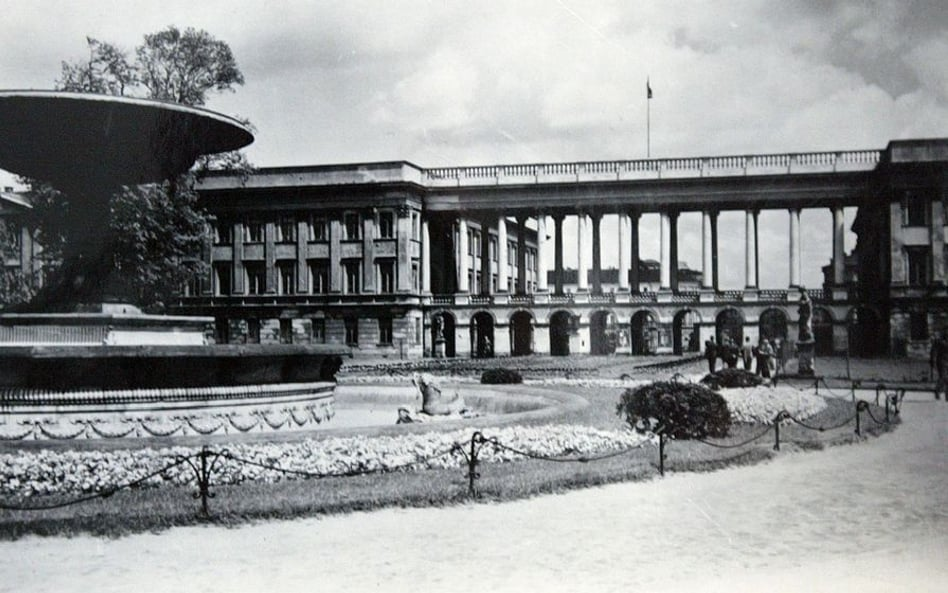
Saxon Palace viewed from Saxon Garden (1930s)

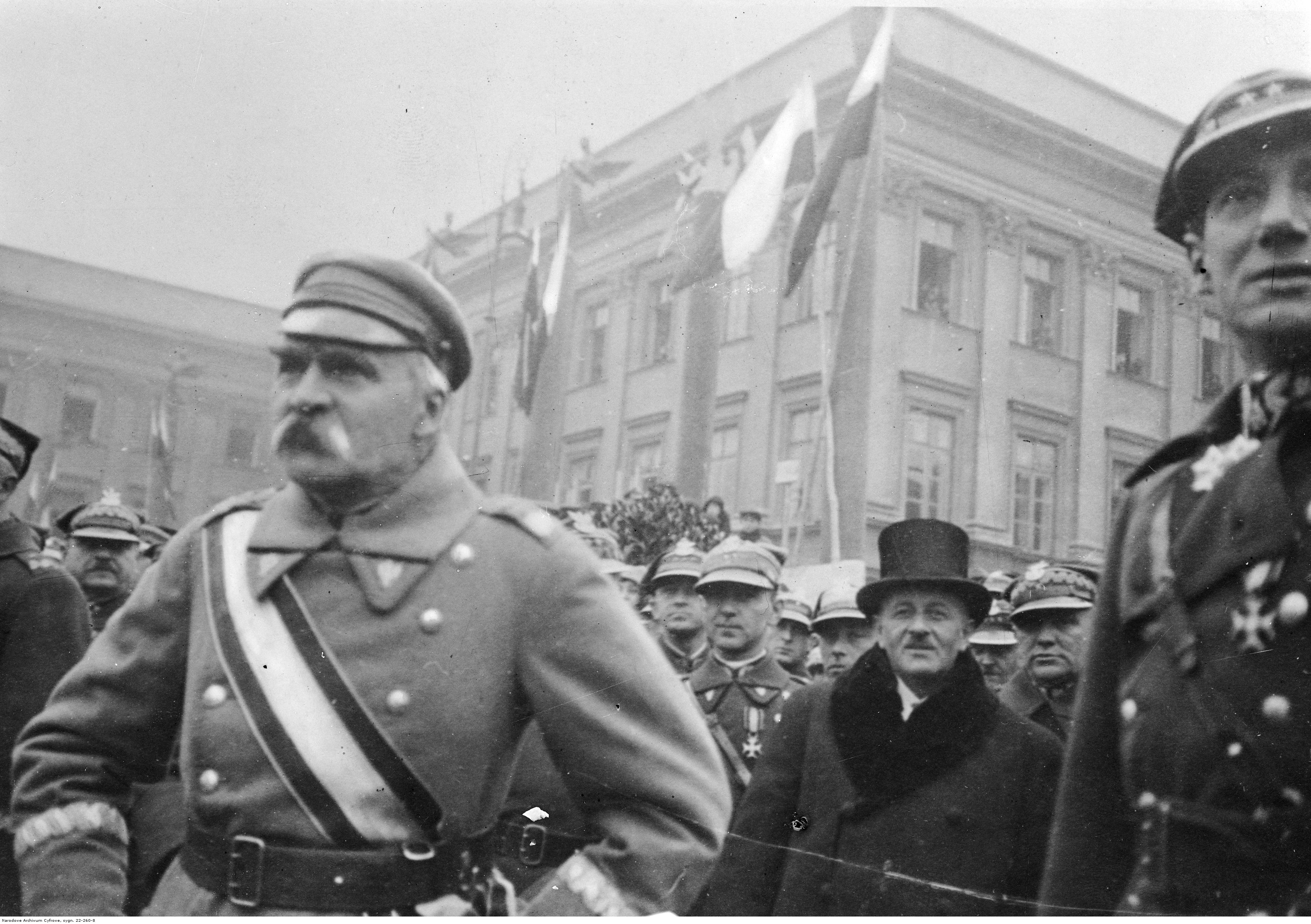
Marshal Józef Piłsudski with Saxon Palace in the background

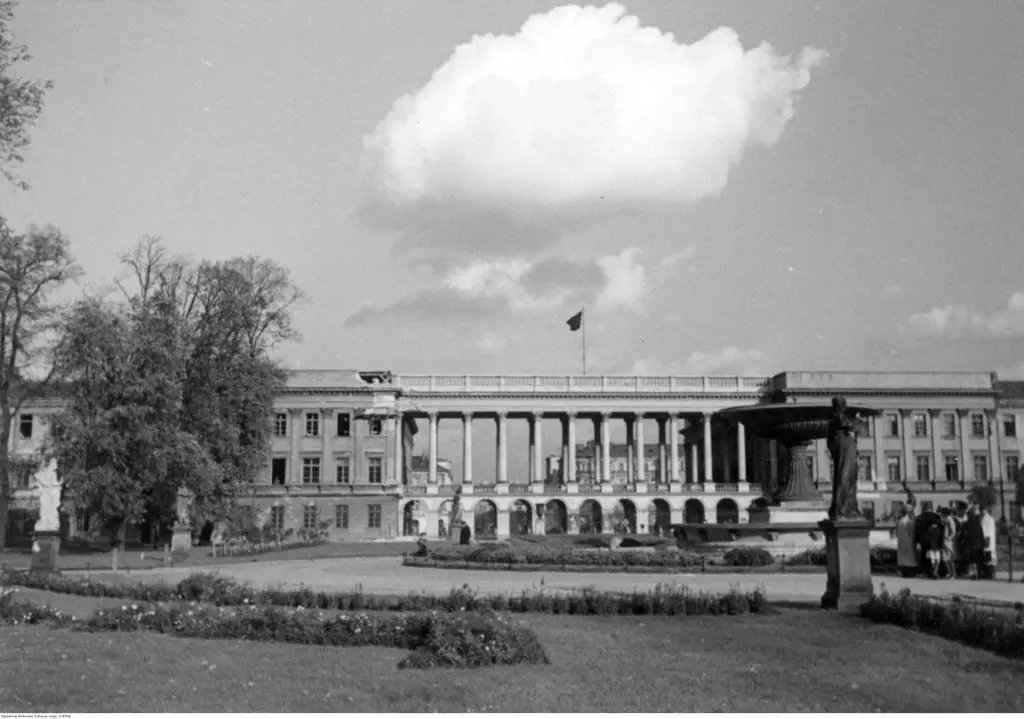
Saxon Palace viewed from Saxon Garden (1939)

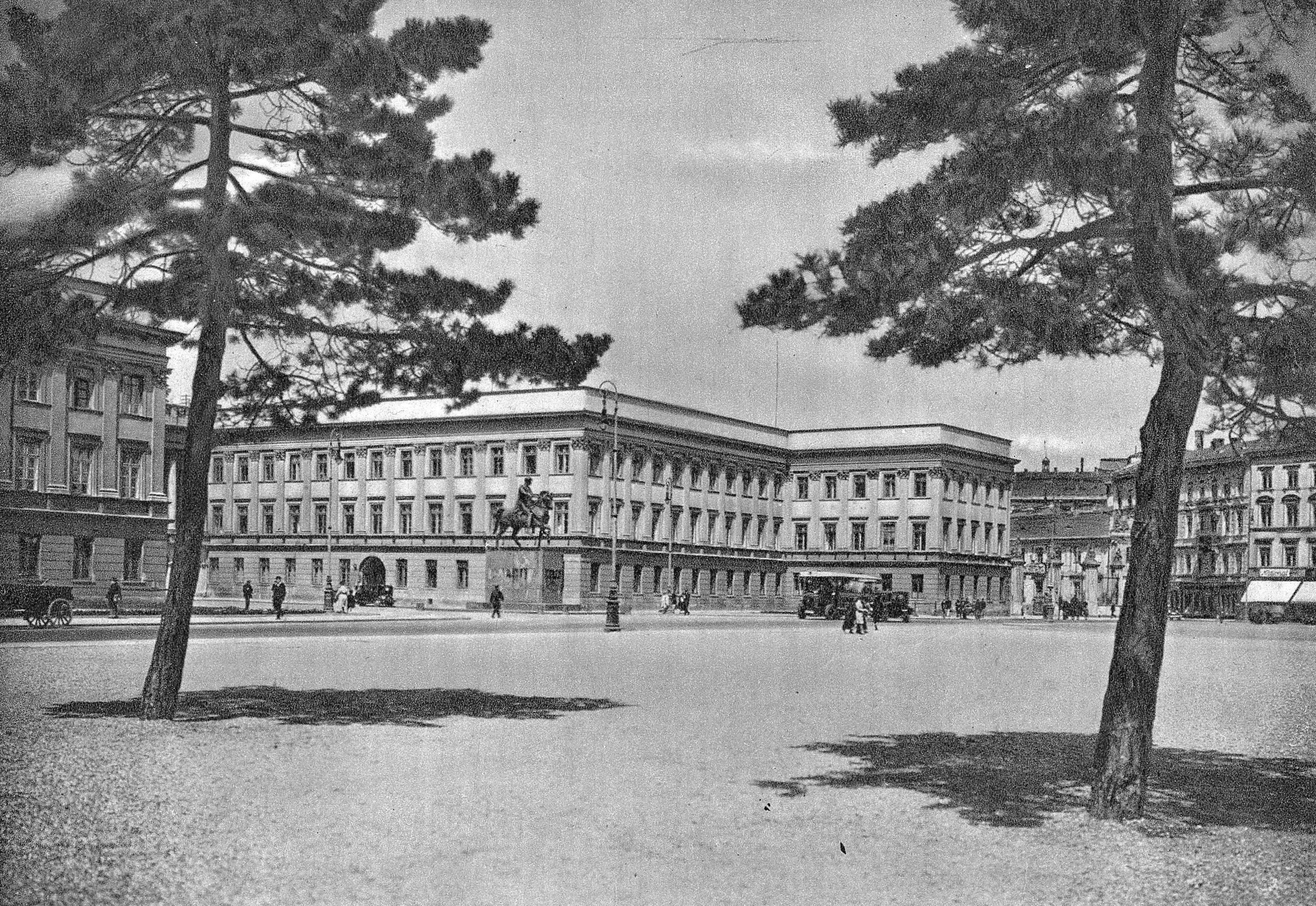
Saxon Square and Saxon Palace (1939)

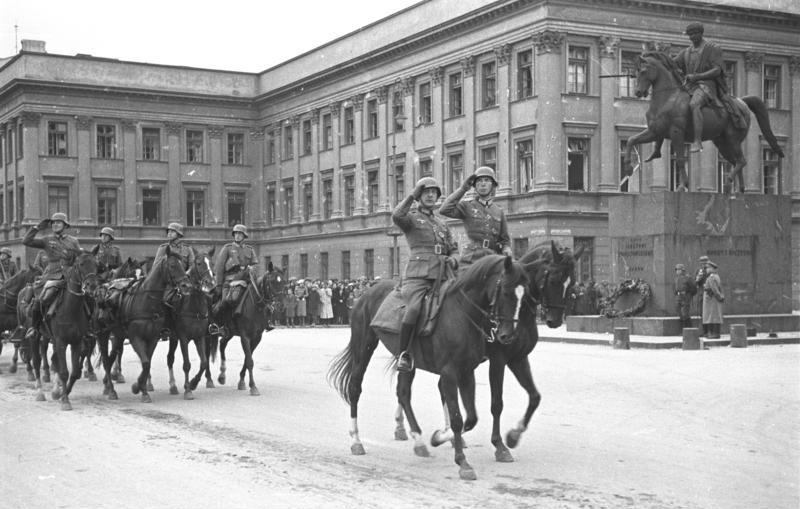
German horse artillery parading before Saxon Palace, autumn 1939

=== 20th century: World War II aftermath ===
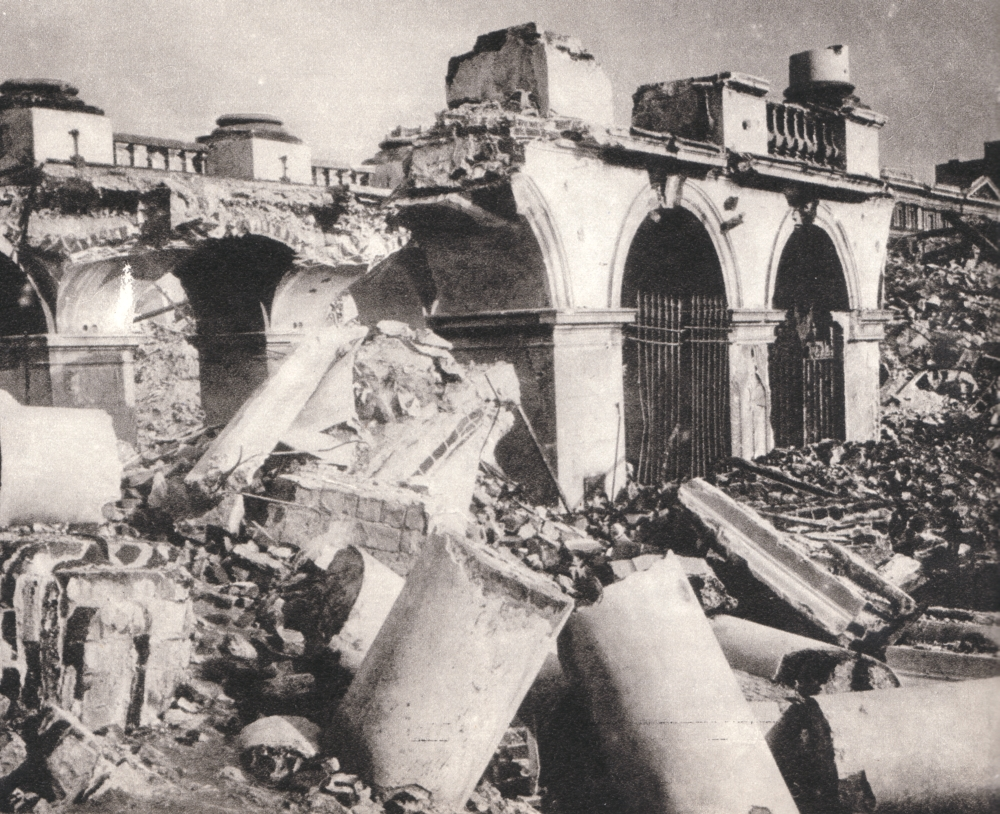
Saxon Palace in ruins after its destruction in World War II (1944)

After World War II, the communist authorities of the Polish People's Republic considered reconstructing the western side of Saxon Square (renamed Victory Square), which included the Saxon Palace. In 1946, architect Zygmunt Stępiński designed a reconstruction of the surviving arcade fragment with the Tomb of the Unknown Soldier. Several architectural competitions were also held for the palace’s full reconstruction, but none resulted in concrete action.

The idea resurfaced in the 1970s with another architectural competition allowing for the reconstruction of lost historical buildings. The winning design by Bohdan Gniewiewski and Bolesław Kosecki was chosen but never realized.

=== 21st century: Reconstruction plans ===
After 1989, discussions about rebuilding the Saxon Palace emerged multiple times. In September 1999, an event was organized to "rebuild" the palace using Lego bricks. The idea gained serious traction between 2004 and 2006, led by Warsaw's mayor, Lech Kaczyński, who made it a flagship project of his administration. In February 2004, a tender was announced for the reconstruction of the Saxon and Brühl Palaces, as well as a historic tenement house on Królewska Street. The construction firm Budimex Dromex SA was selected for the pre-design, design, and construction work. The city allocated 200 million PLN for the project.

Archaeological work uncovered a 1933 tunnel that had connected the palace’s wings near the Tomb of the Unknown Soldier, along with the foundations of the palace. The oldest remains belonged to the 17th-century Morsztyn Palace. Other discoveries included remnants of wells, sewage channels, and latrines. On November 25, 2006, the excavations were opened to the public. However, expert analysis concluded that most of the Saxon Palace’s foundations were too weak to support new construction. On May 17, 2007, the foundations of both the Morsztyn and Saxon Palaces were added to the heritage registry. During the 2006–2008 archaeological work, approximately 45,000 movable artifacts, mainly from the 18th century, were cataloged.

The reconstruction was initially planned for completion by 2010, with the restored palace intended to house Warsaw's municipal offices, which were then scattered across various buildings. However, in 2008, Warsaw’s mayor, Hanna Gronkiewicz-Waltz, canceled the project, despite the 15.6 million PLN already spent. She justified the decision by citing the heritage status of the exposed cellars. In September 2008, the foundations were covered with sand and geotextile fabric for potential future work. The funds originally allocated for the palace were redirected toward constructing the Maria Skłodowska-Curie Bridge.

In 2013, the association "Saski 2018" was established to advocate for rebuilding the Saxon Palace by November 11, 2018, in time for the 100th anniversary of Poland’s independence. The association included Warsaw enthusiasts, lawyers, and archaeologists. Its goals included promoting the palace’s reconstruction in the media, identifying funding sources for the Warsaw or national government, and organizing public discussions on the future of Piłsudski Square.

In September 2014, the interactive project "Saski360" was launched, featuring a multimedia application that used aerial panoramas and visualizations to show the Saxon Palace within modern Warsaw. The PBPA Projekt architectural studio created the visualizations, incorporating aerial photographs from multiple angles to allow users to explore different perspectives. The application also included stationary images with overlaid visualizations, creating a virtual tour of how the Saxon Palace, Brühl Palace, and nearby historic townhouses would appear in today’s cityscape.

From 2021 onward, efforts to rebuild the Saxon Palace gained momentum. A special-purpose company, Pałac Saski, was established in 2021 to oversee the project, and site preparation began in 2022. Archaeological excavations uncovered historical remains, including a water reservoir and a suspected "vampire burial."

A reconstruction council was formed, and an exhibition, Okruchy Przeszłości, showcased historical artifacts from past digs. Officials announced that the Saxon and Brühl Palaces would be rebuilt using authentic materials, with the former housing representative spaces for the Mazovian Voivodeship Marshal’s Office and the latter becoming the Senate's headquarters. A cultural center was also planned inside the Saxon Palace.

In 2022, Pałac Saski partnered with the Association of Polish Architects (SARP) to hold an international design competition. In October 2023, the Warsaw-based firm WXCA was announced as the winning architect. The reconstructed buildings are planned to house the Senate, the Mazovian Voivodship Office, and the headquarters of cultural institutions.

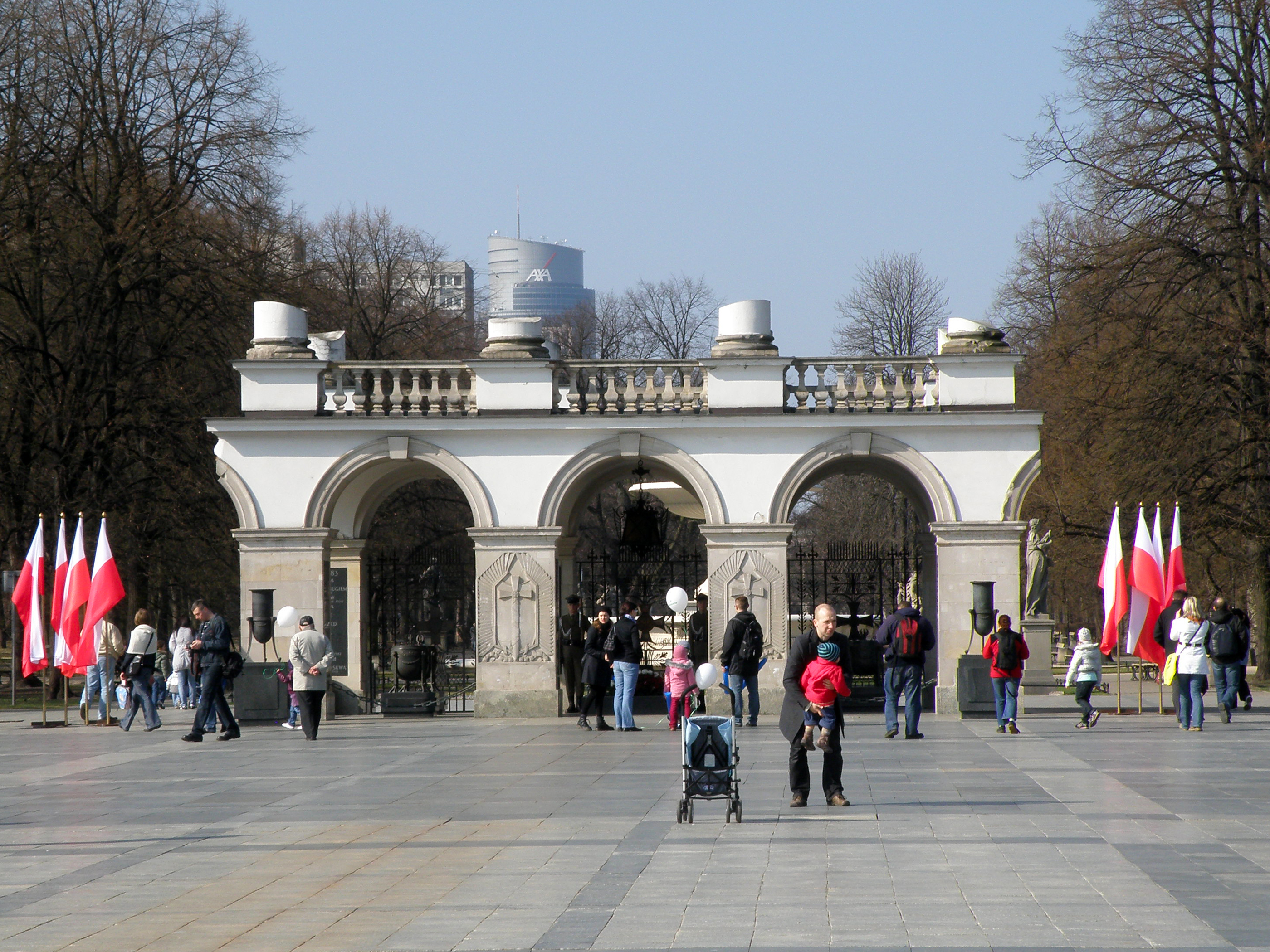
The Palace Arcade housing the Tomb of the Unknown Soldier (2010)

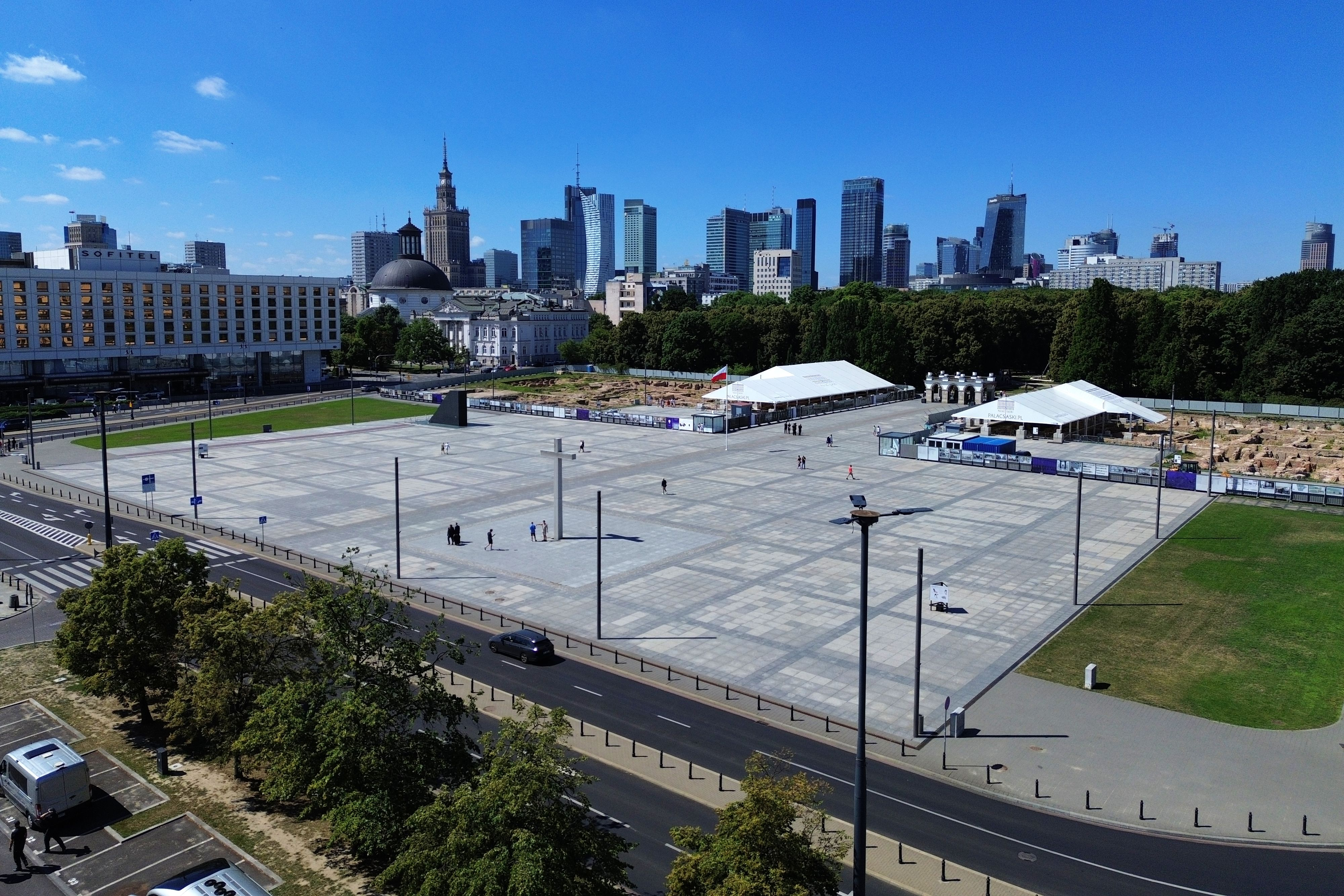
Piłsudski Square with the excavated foundations of the palace (2024)

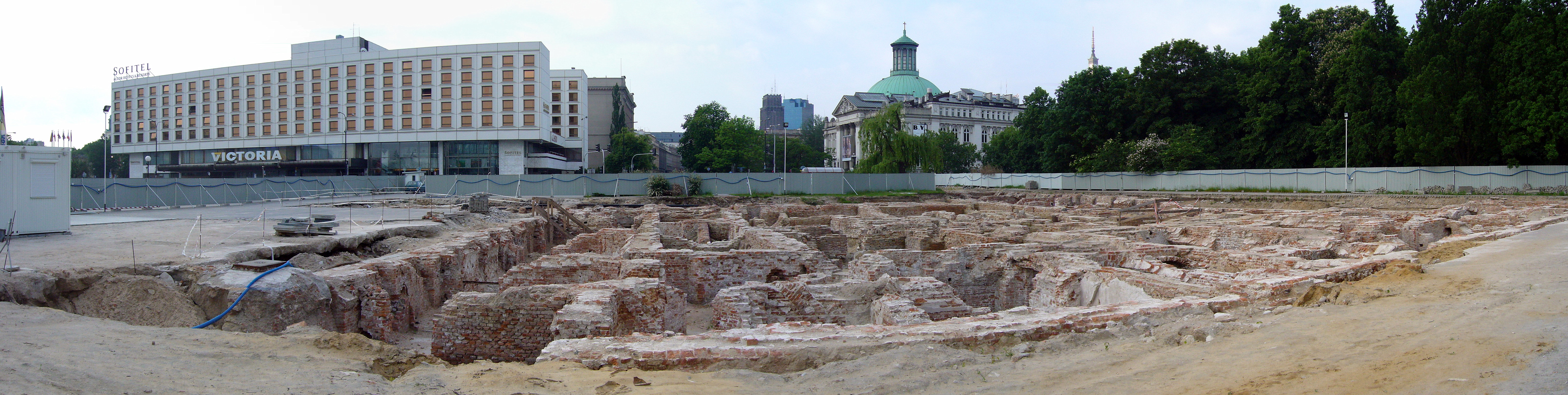
Excavated foundations of the Palace

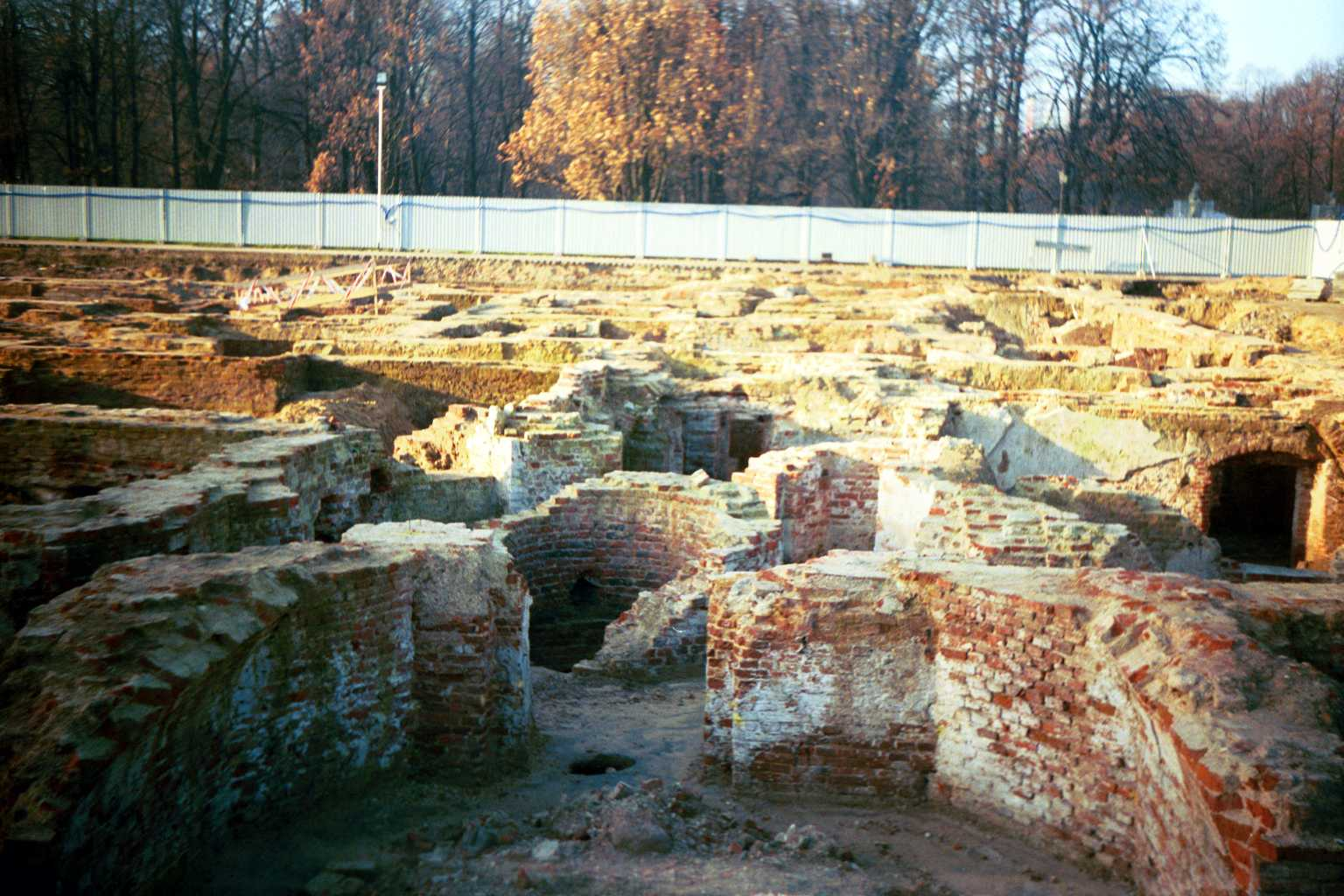
Excavated foundations of the Palace

== See also ==
- Saxon Axis
- Brühl Palace
- Planned destruction of Warsaw

== Literature ==
- Gritt, Cornelius (1917). Warschauer Bauten aus der Zeit der sächsischen Könige (in German). Berlin: Der Zirkel Architektur-Verlag.
- Hentschel, Walter (1967). Die sächsische Baukunst des 18. Jahrhunderts in Polen. (2 volumes: text and pictures) (in German). Berlin: Henschelverlag Kunst und Gesellschaft.
- Charazzinska, Elzbieta (1979). Ogród Saski (in Polish). Warsaw.
- Kozaczuk, Władysław (1984). Enigma: How the German Machine Cipher Was Broken, and How It Was Read by the Allies in World War II. Frederick, Maryland: University Publications of America. ISBN 0-89093-547-5.
- Miłobędzki, A (1990). "Die Architekten in Polen zur Zeit der Herrschaft August des Starken (1697 bis 1733)". In Mertens, Klaus; Milde, Kurt; Stenke, G (eds.). Matthäus Daniel Pöppelmann 1662-1736 und die Architektur der Zeit Augusts des Starken. Verlag der Kunst. ISBN 978-3364001920.
- Borowska, Joanna (2009). Opowiesci z Pałacu Saskiego (in Polish). Warsaw: Green Gallery. p. 134. ISBN 978-83-929033-0-7.
- DeLang, S (2013). "Seine Baugeschichte und Seine Stellung innerhalb der europäischen Schlossbaukunst des 18. Jahrhundert". In Syndram, Dirk (ed.). Die königliche Jagdresidenz Hubertusburg und der Frieden von 1763. DDV EDITION. ISBN 978-3943444155.
- Zieliński, Jarosław (2019). Plac Warszawski plac Piłsudskiego jako zwierciadło losów i duchowej kondycji narodu (in Polish). Warsaw: Ekbin. p. 490.
- Borowska, Joanna (2020). Niezwykła historia pałacu Saskiego (in Polish). Warsaw: Skarpa Warszawska. p. 304.
- Szymski, Adam-Maria (2020). "Three Squares – A Commentary on the History of a Place. Saxon Square in Warsaw Trzy Place Glosa do Historii Miejsca. Plac Saski w Warszawie" (PDF). Forma (in English and Polish). 42: 10–52.
