= Operalnia =

Former opera house in Warsaw, Poland

Coordinates: 52°14′26″N 21°00′31″E

Operalnia was an opera house in Warsaw in Poland, built in 1725 and torn down in 1772. It was situated in the south-western part of Saxon Garden.

== History ==
The building was constructed by the order of Augustus II and modelled after the small court theatre of Dresden from 1687. Prior to the Operalnia, opera and theatre had only been performed in Poland at the private royal court theatres.

The opera house opened on 3 August 1748 and became the first public opera theatre in Poland. Foreign (mostly Italian and French) opera, ballet, and theatre was performed on the stage of the Operalnia.

In 1765, the National Theatre, Warsaw, was inaugurated in the Operalnia opera house. The theatre shared the building with opera and ballet for several years.

The building was deemed no longer sufficient in 1772 and torn down. The National Theatre as well as the opera was moved to the Radziwiłł Palace at the Krakowskie Przedmieście and in 1778 to a building at the Krasiński square, where it remained until 1833.
