= Mier Halls =

Historic building in Warsaw, Poland

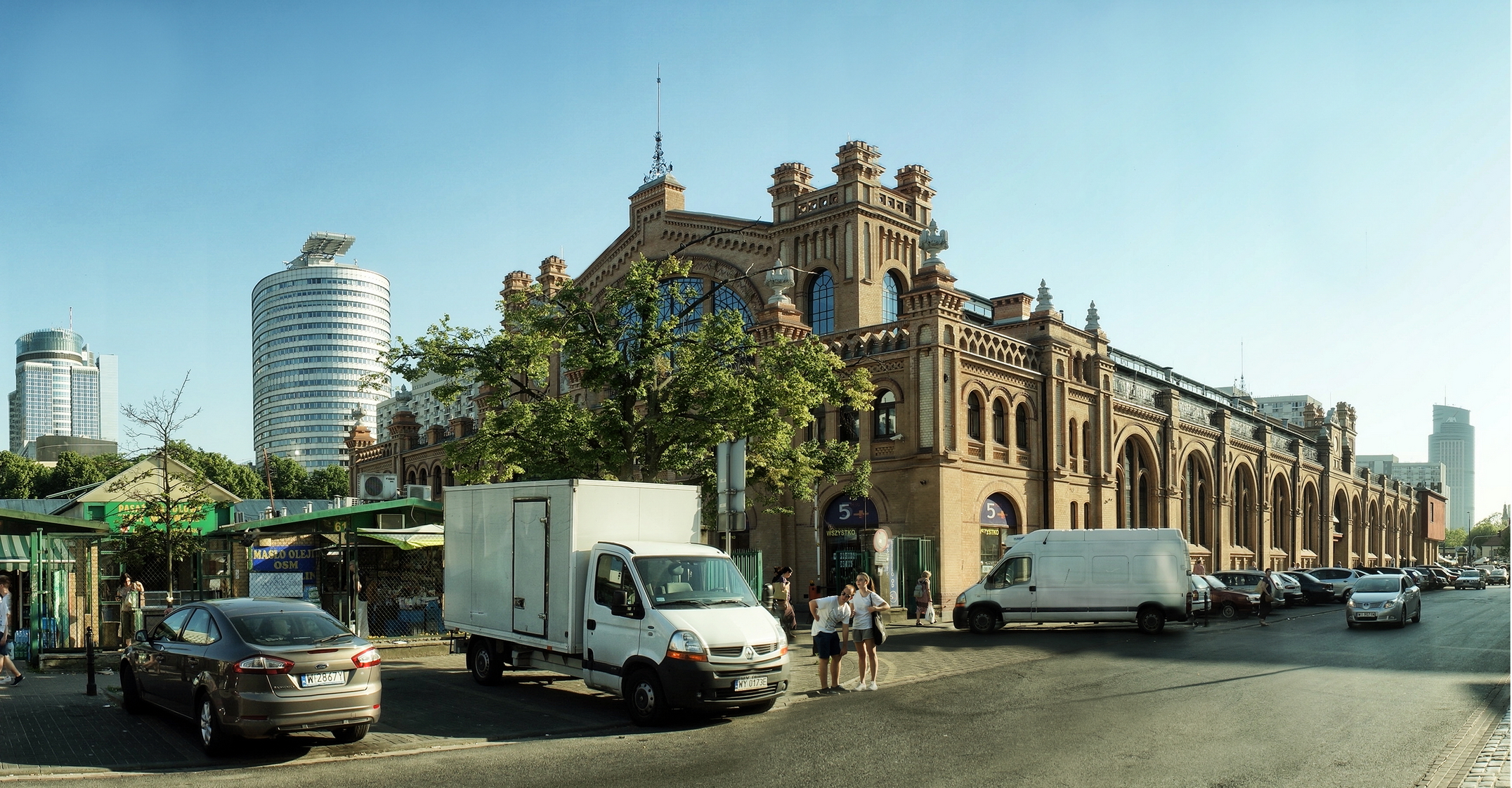
- The West Hall in 2014.
- Interactive map of the Mier Halls area

General information
- Type: Market halls
- Location: Downtown, Warsaw, Poland, 1 Iron Gate Square; 1 Mier Square
- Coordinates: 52°14′19″N 20°59′49″E
- Construction started: 15 October 1899
- Completed: 1902

Technical details
- Floor count: 2

Design and construction
- Architects: Bolesław Milkowski; Ludwik Panczakiewicz; Apoloniusz Nieniewski; Władysław Kozłowski

The Mier Halls (Polish: Hale Mirowskie) are two identical market halls in Warsaw, Poland, within the neighbourhood of North Downtown, at 1 Iron Gate Square and 1 Mier Square. They were constructed between 1899 and 1902, and remained the largest commerce location in the city until 1944, when they were destroyed during the Warsaw Uprising. The halls were rebuilt in 1944 and 1962.

== History ==
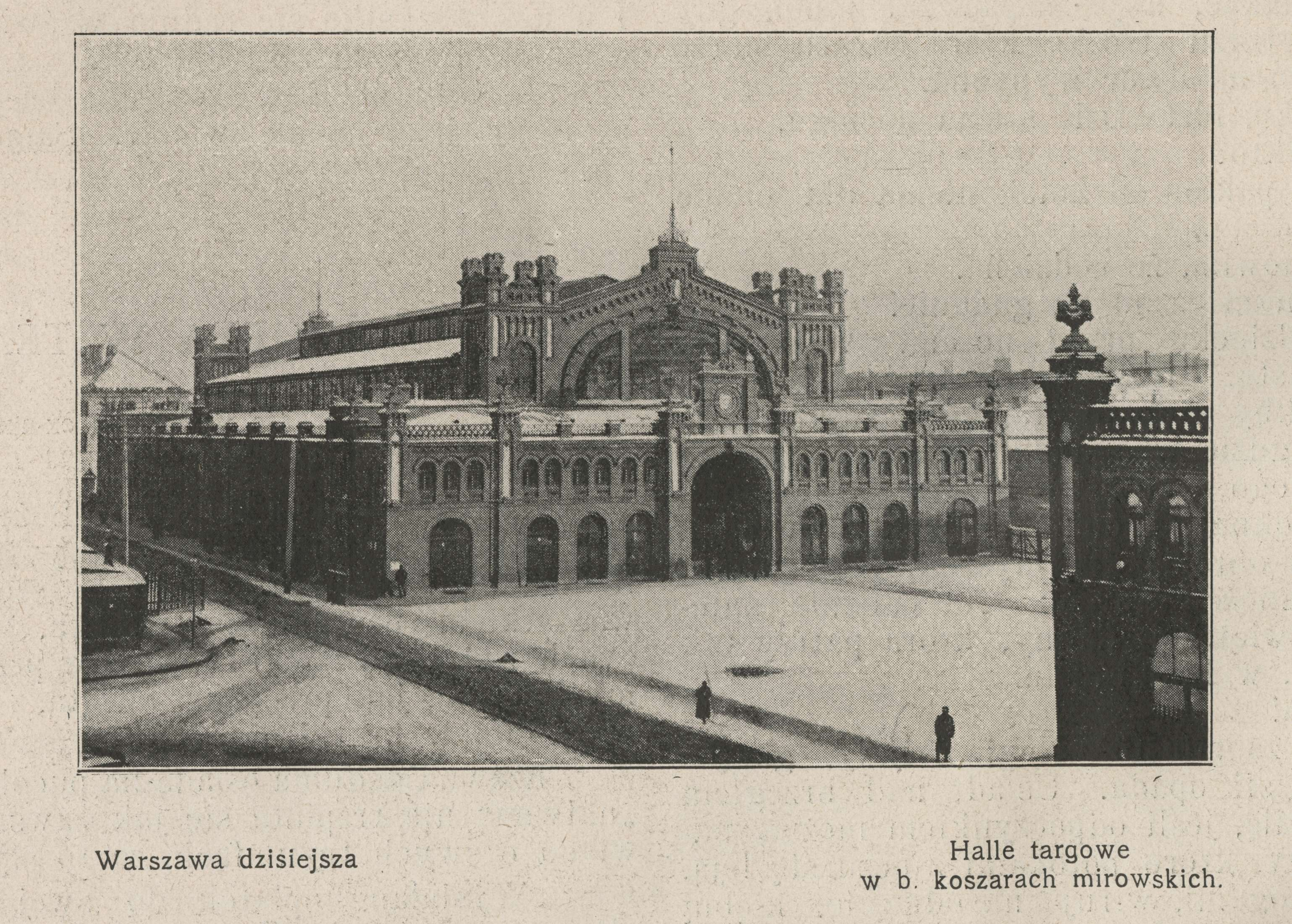
The East Hall in 1902.

They were the first market hall complex in Warsaw. They allowed for better organization of trade and improved hygienic conditions of the vendor spaces, thanks to moving them to the inside.

The cornerstone was laid on 15 October 1899, and the halls were constructed between 1899 and 1902, in place of four deconstructed buildings of the Mier Barracks. They were named after them, which in turn, were named after Wilhelm Mier, who was their founder and a cavalry major general in the Crown Army of the Polish–Lithuanian Commonwealth. They would later become the namesake of the nearby neighbourhood of Mirów. The halls were designed by Bolesław Miłkowski (construction), Ludwik Panczakiewicz (façade), Apoloniusz Nieniewski, and Władysław Kozłowski. The complex consisted of two identical market halls, with the length of 95.4 m and width of 42.8 m. Their metal construction was manufactured by company K. Rudzki i S-ka. Above the entrances were placed zinc cartouches depicting the Mermaid of Warsaw. It total, their construction cost 1.4 million roubles.

The halls were owned by the city, which rented 515 market stalls and stores to the individual vendors. They offered groceries and household appliances. The placement of the stalls was determined by which category of products they offered.

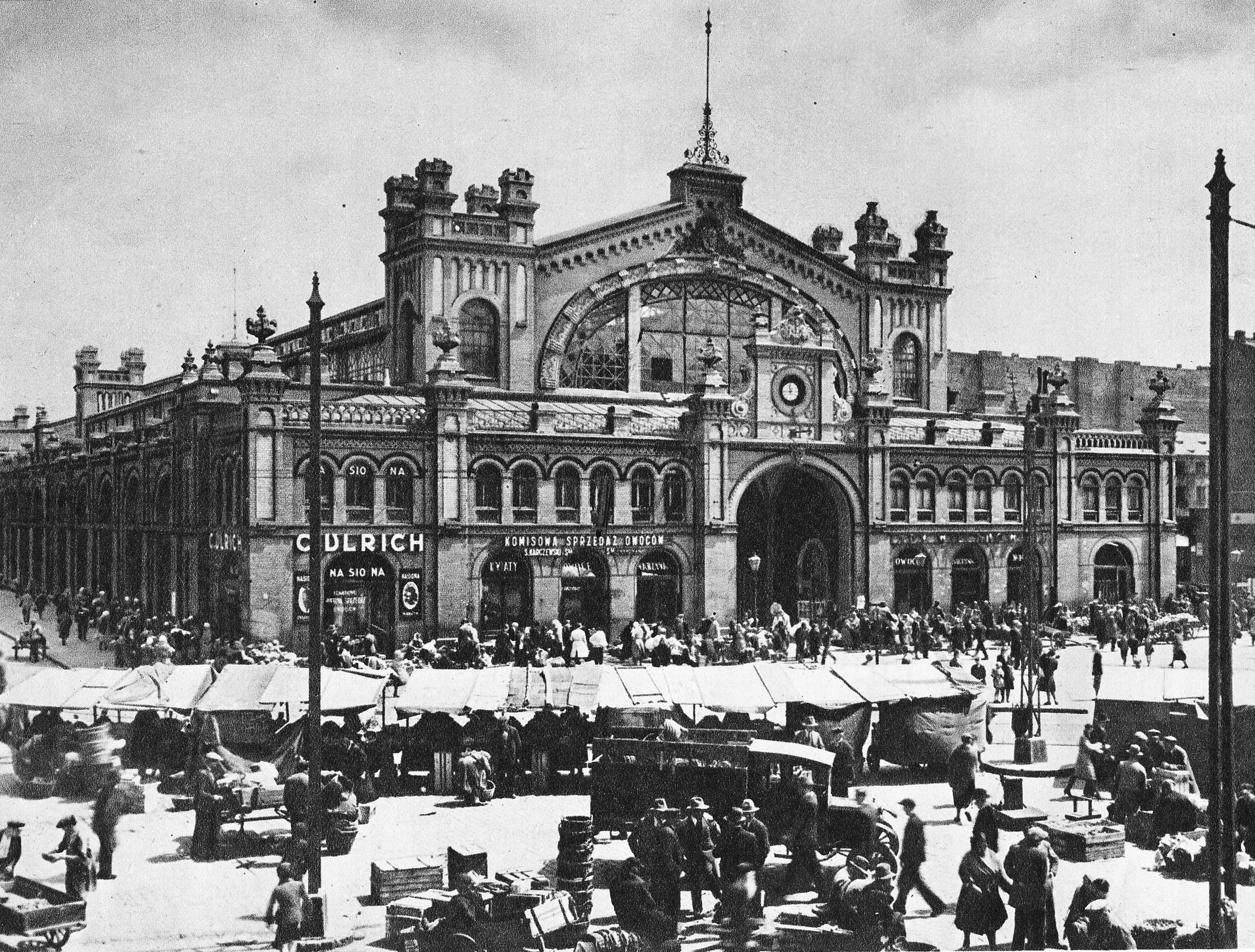
The West Hall in 1932.

Prior to the outbreak of the Second World War in 1939, the halls included around stalls and stores, and remained the largest commercial facility in the city. They were bordered by two smaller market places, the Guest Court and Janusz Market, and the vendors also set up their stalls on neighbouring streets and at the Iron Gate Square. The area as a whole, was jokingly referred to as the "stomach of Warsaw".

During the Siege of Warsaw in 1939, to one of the halls was evacuated the Hospital of the Holy Spirit. In 1940, next to them was constructed the wall of the Warsaw Ghetto. In 1941, there operated 1641 market stalls, over twice as much as prior to the conflict. The buildings were heavily damaged in 1944 during the Warsaw Uprising. On 1 August, there was a fight for the east hall, which housed German car workshops. Both halls burned down between 5 and 6 August, following the German attacks towards the Piłsudski Square, which were accompanied by aerial bombings. They were captured by SS-Sonderregiment Dirlewanger, under the command of SS-Sturmbannführer Kurt Weisse (acting commander at that time until 8 August) on 6 August. Local population was forced to work on deconstruction of insurgent barricades, and executed afterwards. Their bodies were then set on fire by the Warsaw Burning Detachment. On 7 August, Polish insurgents successfully rescued a group of people held in the halls. Later, they made two more unsuccessful attempts to recapture the halls, on 13 August, and at night of 30 and 31 August.

Following the end of the conflict, it was originally decided to not rebuilt the Mier Halls and Iron Gate Square, and instead to build there a public park. However, later the idea was abandoned, and the halls were rebuilt. The East Hall was rebuilt in 1948, and began being used as a provisional bus depot. In 1953, it was donated to the Gwardia Militia Sports Club, and the same year, it hosted the European Amateur Boxing Championships, with 5,300 spectators. Later, there were also hosted the 1959 World Weightlifting Championships, as well as tournaments in basketball and fencing, and tennis matches. After 1989, it again began housing commercial spaces, with a small portion being relegated to the boxing club Gwardia Warsaw.

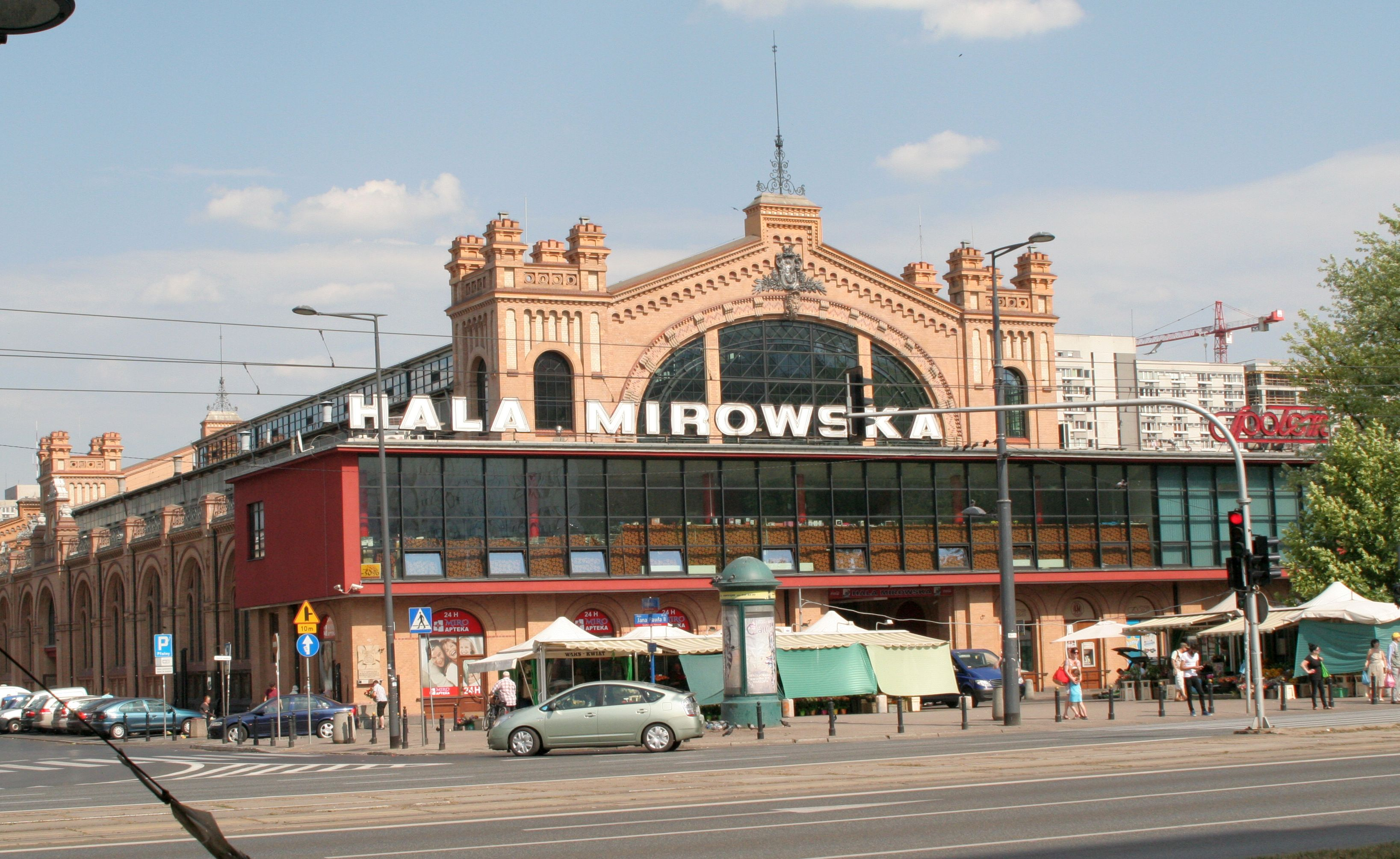
The West Hall in 2015.

In the 1950s, at the wall of the West Hall, was placed a Tchorek plaque commemorating the massacre of civilian population in August 1944. The hall was rebuilt in 1962, in accordance to the project by Zbigniew Pawlak, and in November of that year, again began being used as a market place. In the 1960s, it was expanded with a modernist concrete and glass extension, added to its upper eastern façade. In 1974, it began being rented by store Społem, which eventually, had been given its ownership in 1997. In 2008, at the façade of the West Hall was installed one of the Warsaw Ghetto boundary markers. The building itself was renovated in 2011, however bullet holes and other damages dating to the building were preserved in its façade. In 1986 both buildings received the status of protected cultural property. The East Hall was also renovated in 2017, and began to house a marketplace with local and organic food, as well as stores and restaurants. The Feliks Stamm Boxing Museum opened then. The building remains the property of the city.

A marketplace opened next to the halls, which in 2024, housed around 150 businesses.

== Characteristics ==
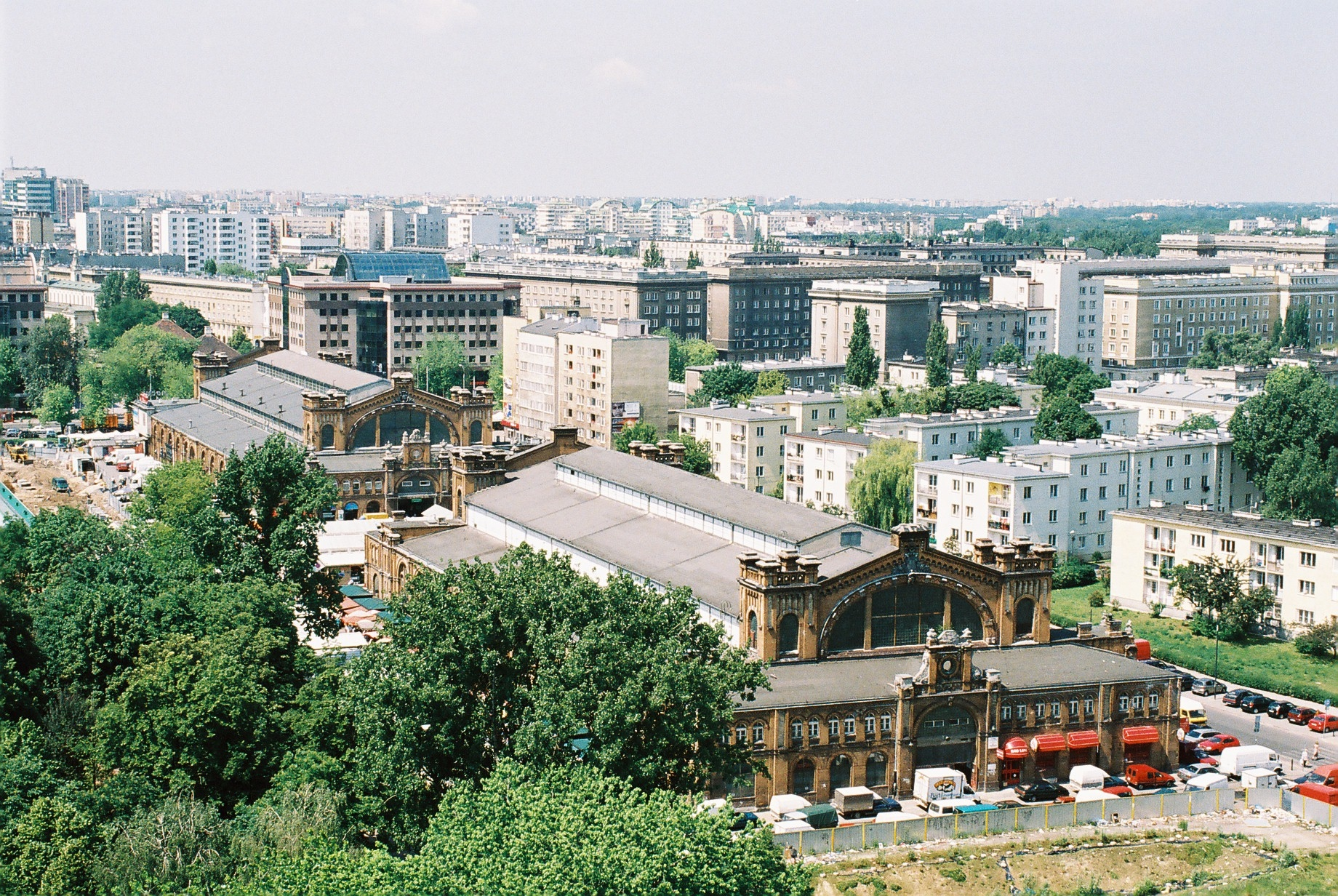
The halls in 2005 seen from aerial view.

The Mier Halls are identical two-storey market halls, with a length of 95.4 m and a width of 42.8 m. The complex consists of the West Hall (Polish: Hala Zachodnia), at 1 Mier Square, and the East Hall (Polish: Hala Wschodnia) at 1 Iron Gate Square, which are also alternatively known as the Mier Hall (Polish: Hala Mirowska), and the Guard Hall (Polish: Hala Gwardii), respectively. Above their entrances are placed zinc cartouches depicting the Mermaid of Warsaw. The halls are separated by the Mier Square (Polish: Plac Mirowski), which contains a small market, while to the south they also border the Mier Park. They contain numerous stores, stalls, and restaurants. The West Hall is owned by the city, and the East Hall, by company Społem.

The East Hall, also houses the Feliks Stamm Boxing Museum, dedicated to the history of boxing. Outside the building, in the nearby Mier Park, is also placed a monument dedicated to boxing champion Feliks Stamm.

The façade of the West Hall features a Tchorek plaque commemorating the massacre of civilian population which took place there, during the Warsaw Uprising in August 1944, and one of the Warsaw Ghetto boundary markers.

== Gallery ==
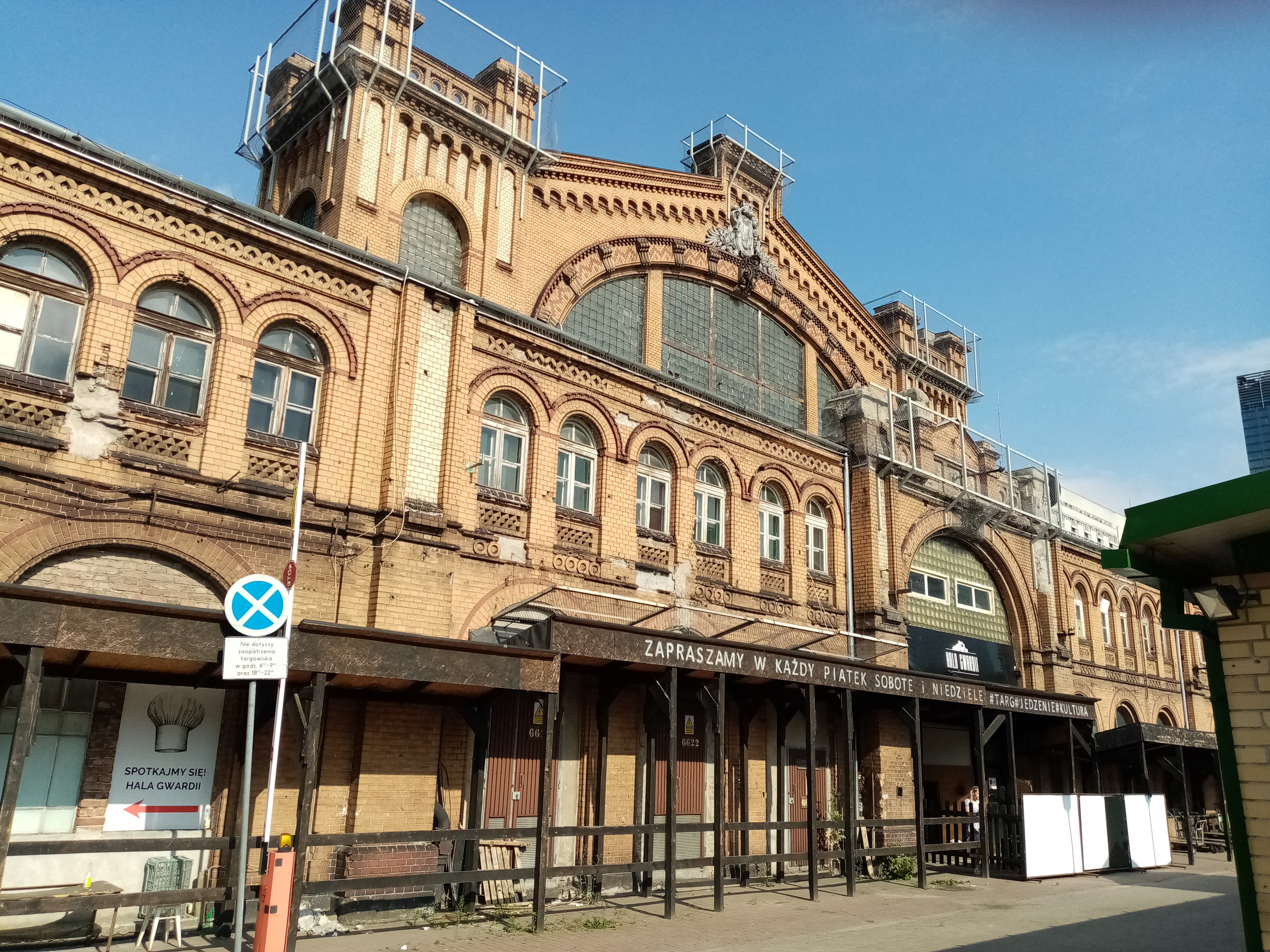
The East Hall in 2021

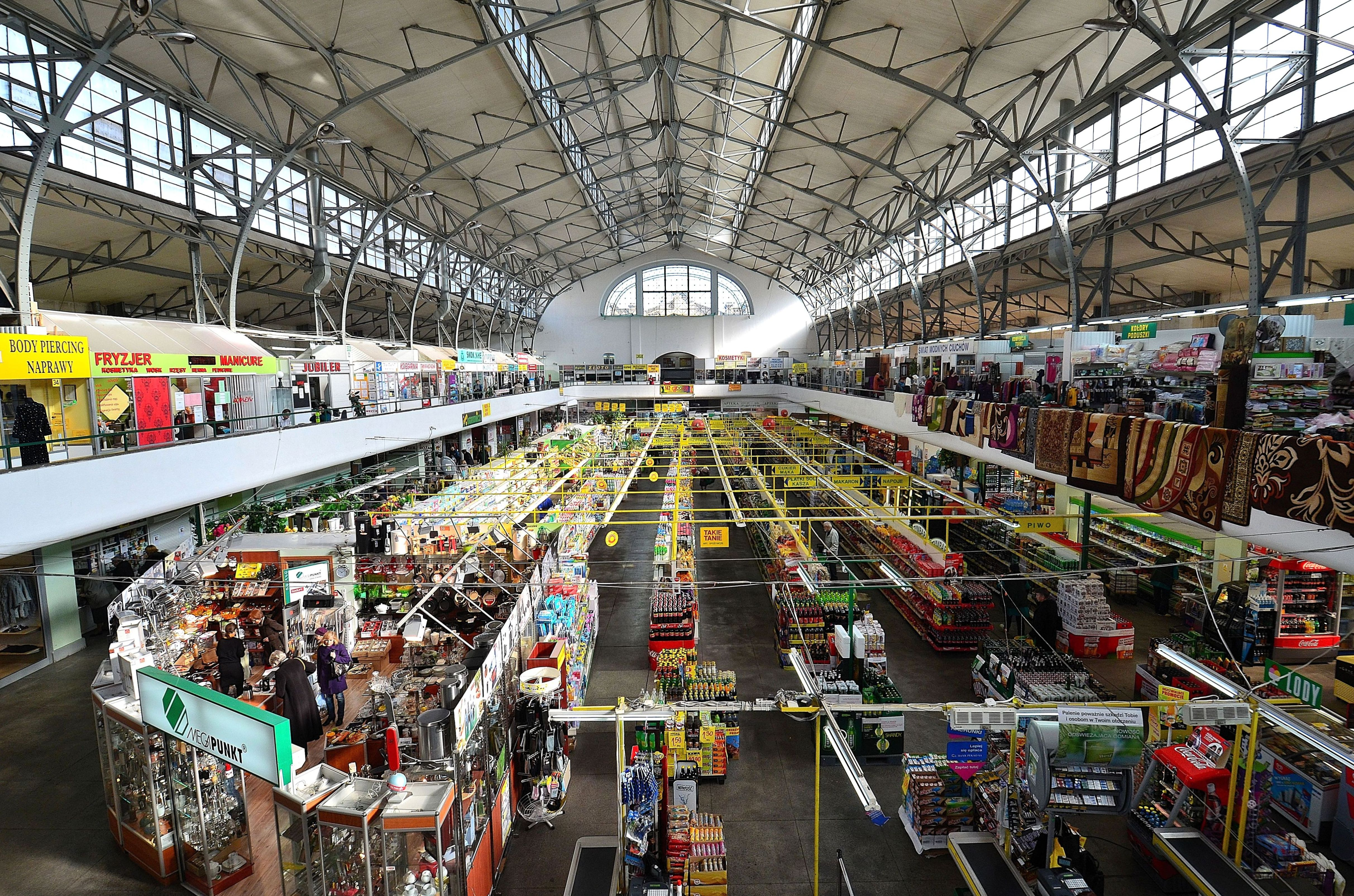
The inside of the West Hall in 2012.

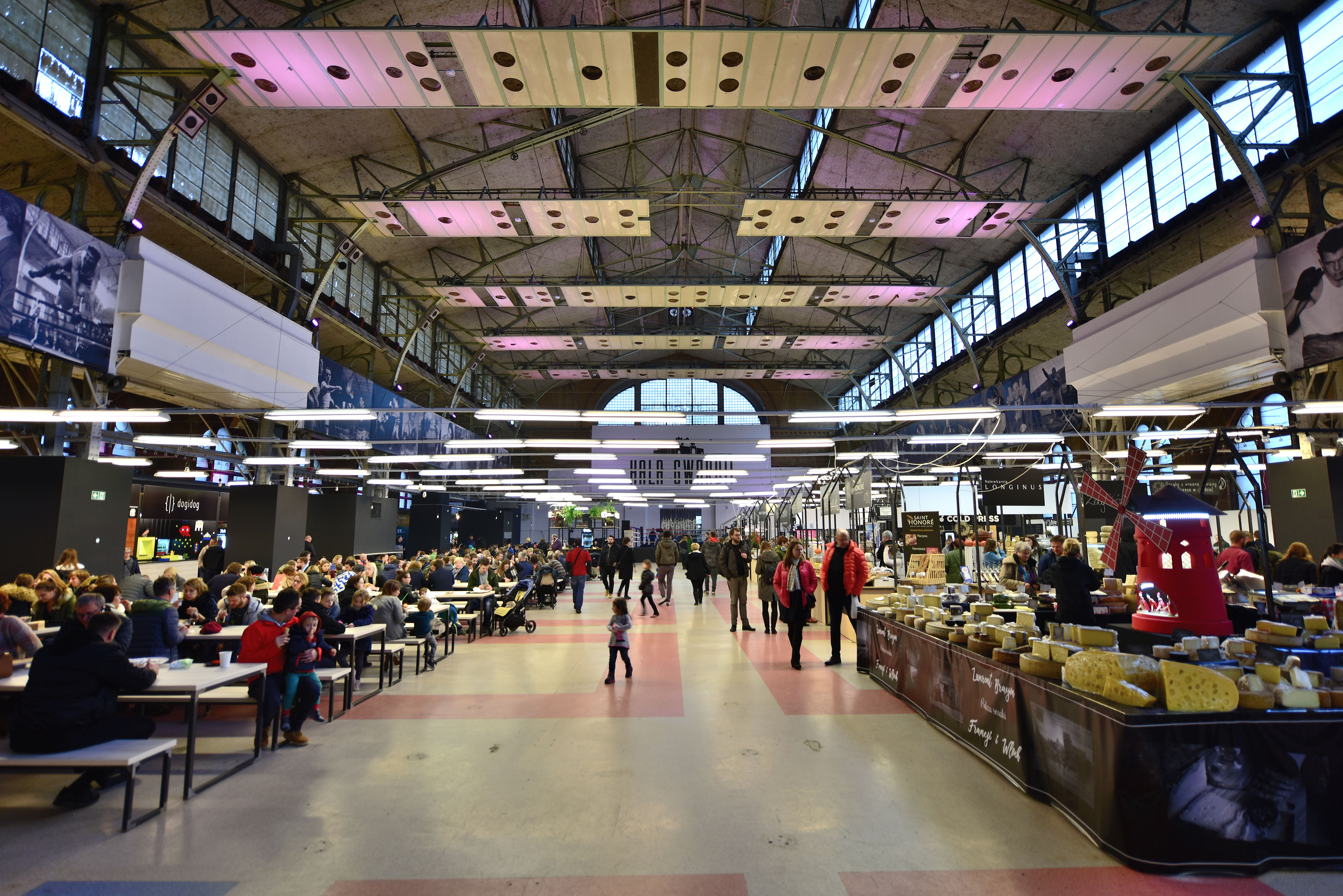
The inside of the East Hall in 2012.

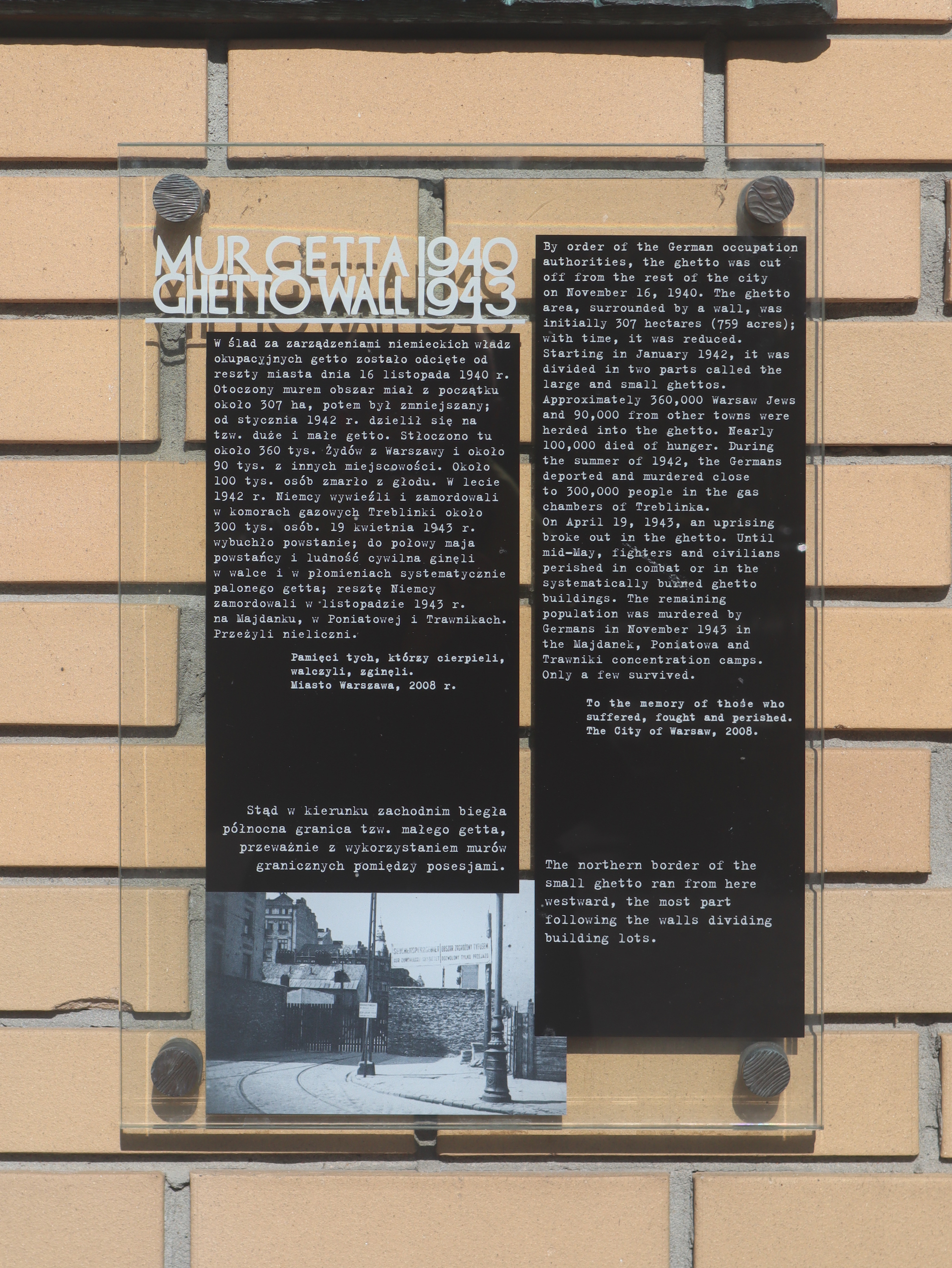
The Warsaw Ghetto boundary marker.

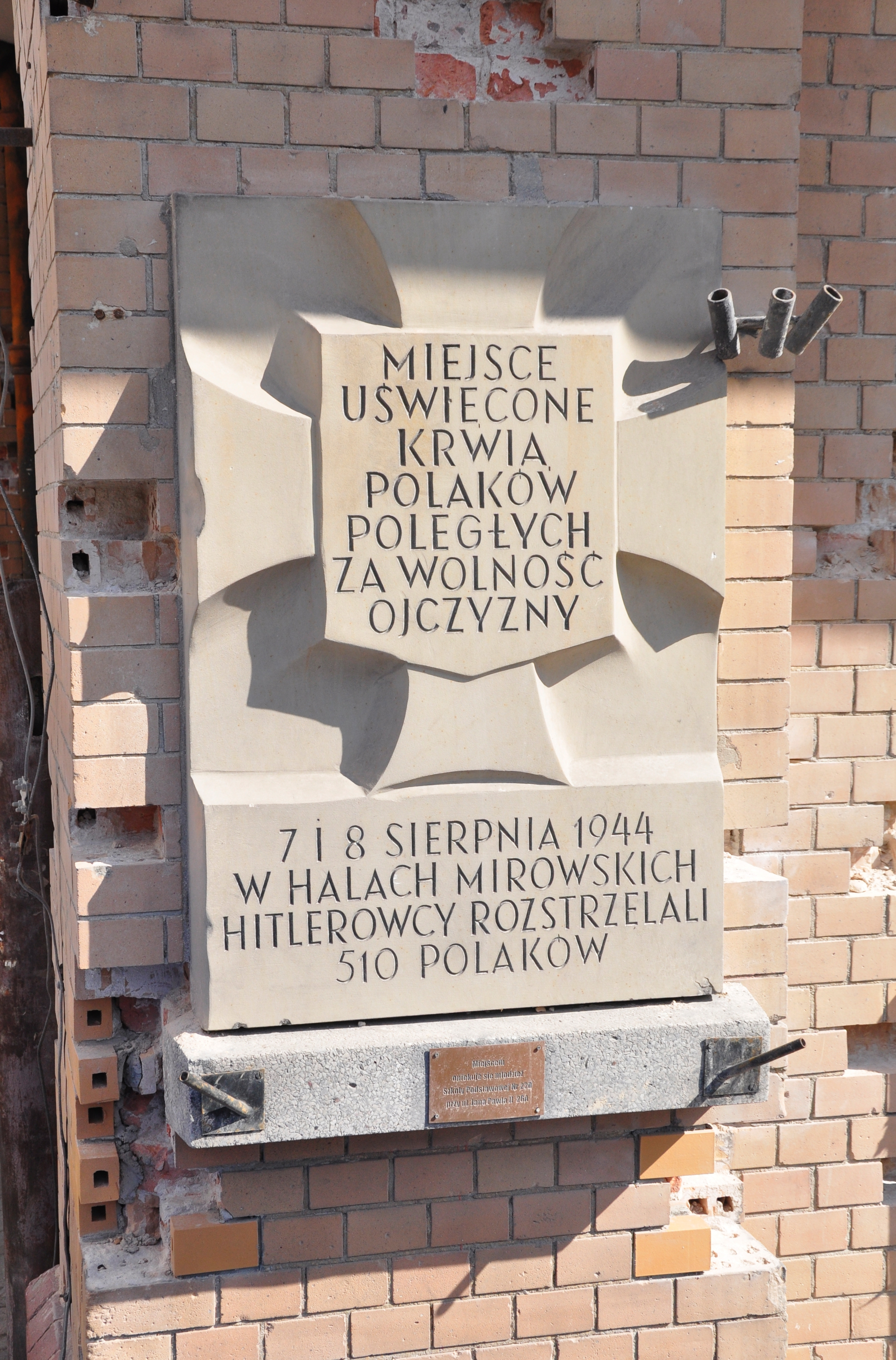
The Tchorek plaque commemorating the massacre of civilian population of 1944.

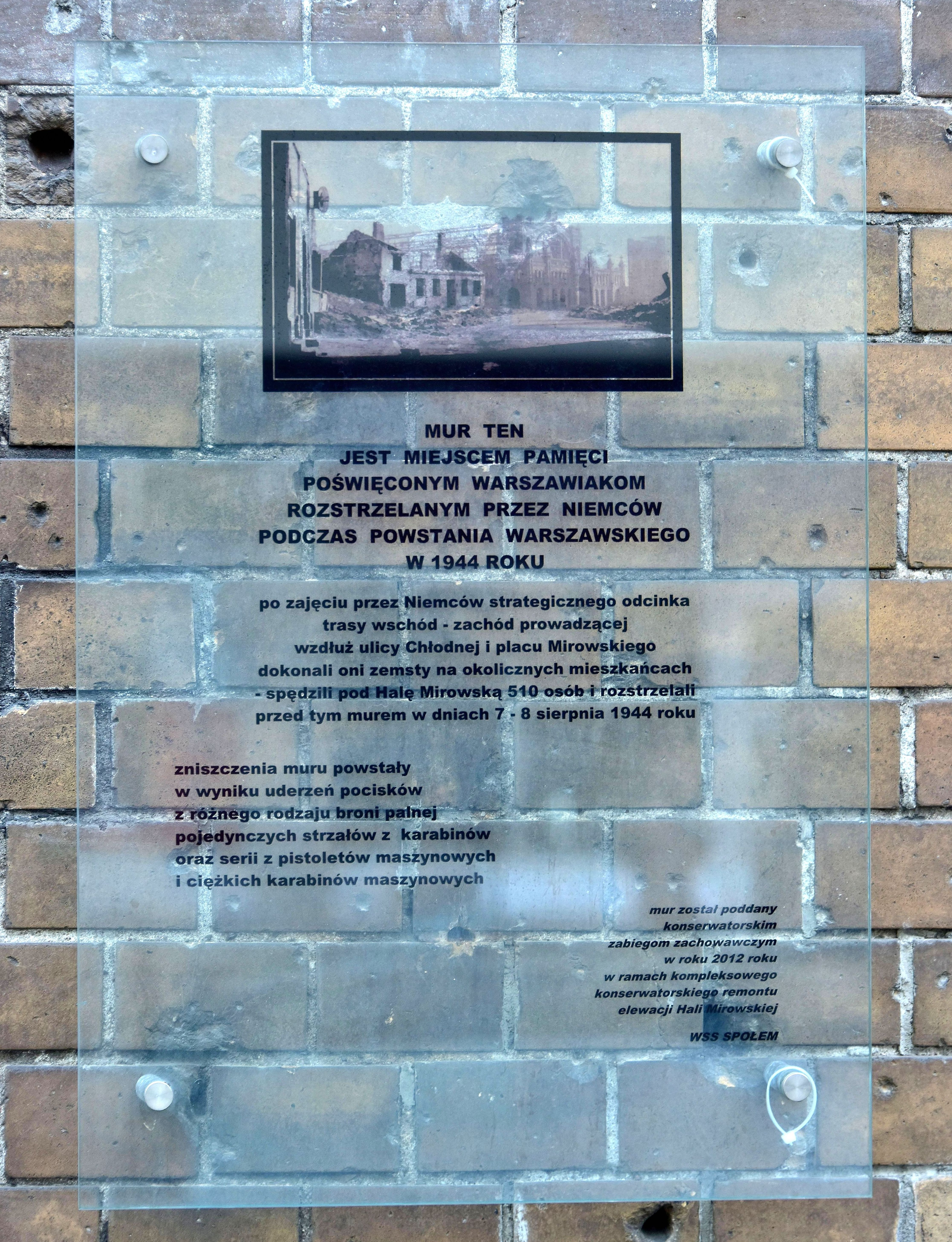
A commemorative plaque dedicated to the massacre of civilian population of 1944.

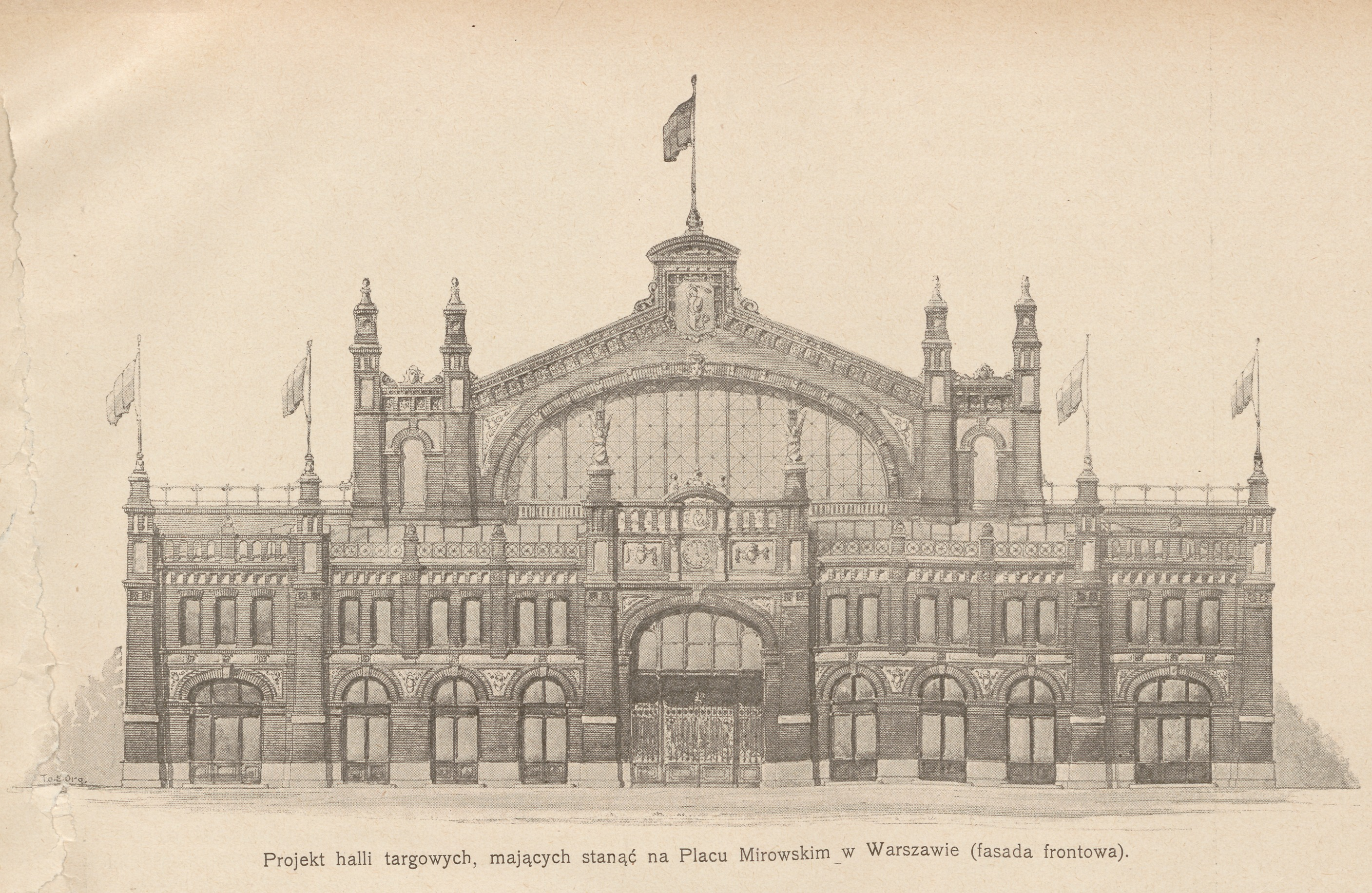
Original plan and front design of the Mier Halls, dating to 1899.
