= Nisko Synagogue =

Former synagogue in Nisko, Poland

- Polish: Synagoga w Nisku
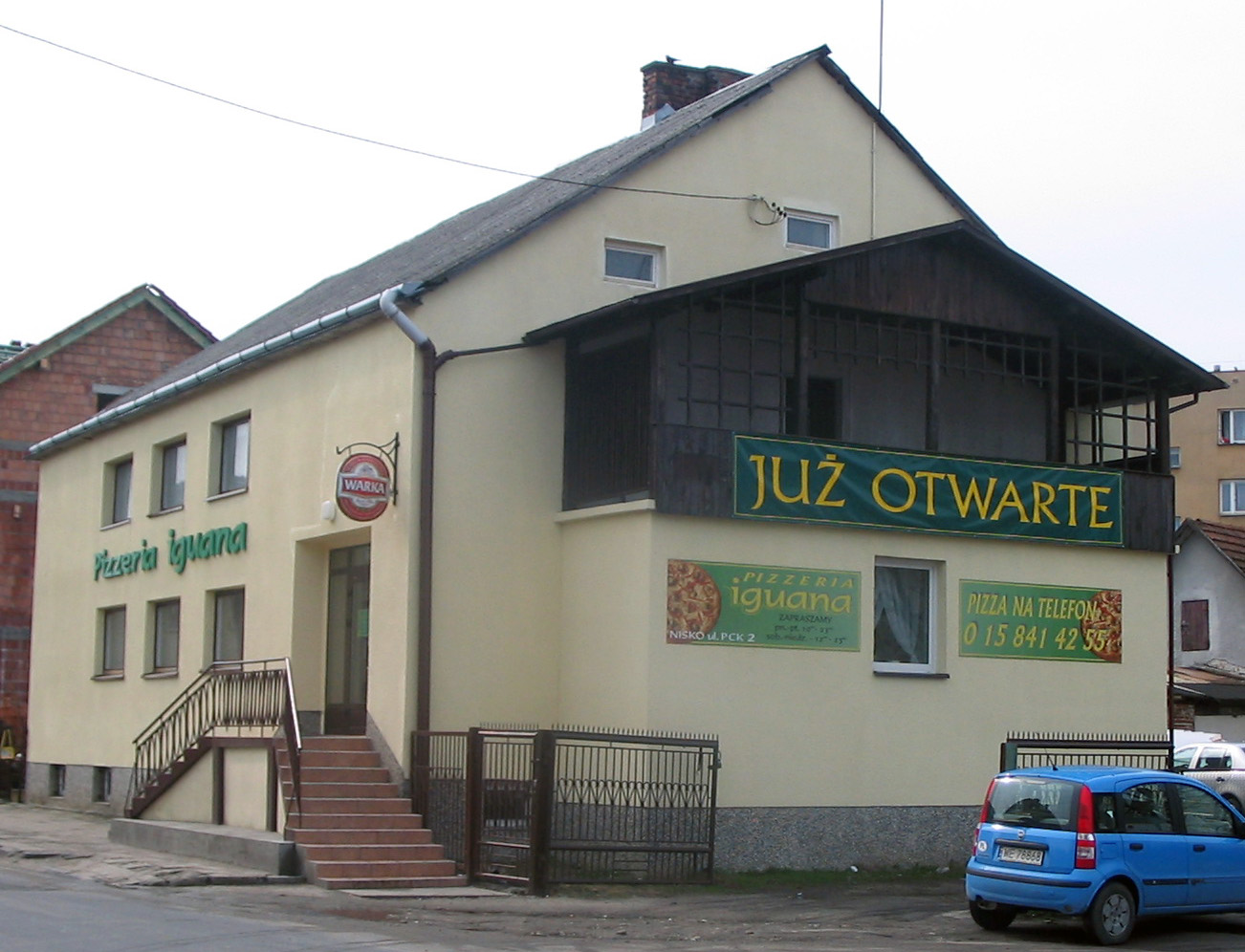
- The former synagogue, now restaurant, in 2007

- Location of the former synagogue in Podkarpackie Voivodeship

Religion
- Affiliation: Orthodox Judaism (former)
- Rite: Nusach Ashkenaz
- Ecclesiastical or organizational status: Synagogue (c. 1890s–1939); Restaurant (since )
- Status: Inactive (as a synagogue); Repurposed

Location
- Location: 2 Polskiego Czerwonego Krzyża Street, Nisko, Podkarpackie Voivodeship
- Country: Poland
- Interactive map of Nisko Synagogue
- Coordinates: 50°31′01″N 22°08′49″E

Architecture
- Type: Synagogue architecture
- Completed: Late 19th century

Specifications
- Interior area: 17 m × 10 m (56 ft × 33 ft)
- Materials: Brick

The Nisko Synagogue (Polish: Synagoga w Nisku) was an Orthodox Jewish congregation and synagogue, located at 2 Polskiego Czerwonego Krzyża Street, in Nisko, in the Podkarpackie Voivodeship of Poland.

== History ==
Completed in the late 19th century, the synagogue served as a house of prayer until World War II when it was devastated by German Nazis during their occupation.

After 1945, facility was used by PZPS, food wholesaler's, and the Polish Wrestling Federation. On 24 August 1953, the former synagogue was devolved for Polish consumers' co-operative called Społem and it was used as an inn. The building was acquired by the state in 1958; and at a later stage the building was used for retail shops, as coffee house, and as a restaurant. All exterior and interior visual evidence of the building's former use as a synagogue has been erased.

The building measures at 17 m × 10 m (56 ft × 33 ft).

== See also ==
- History of the Jews in Poland
- List of active synagogues in Poland
