= Guest Court (Warsaw) =

Former retail building in Warsaw, Poland

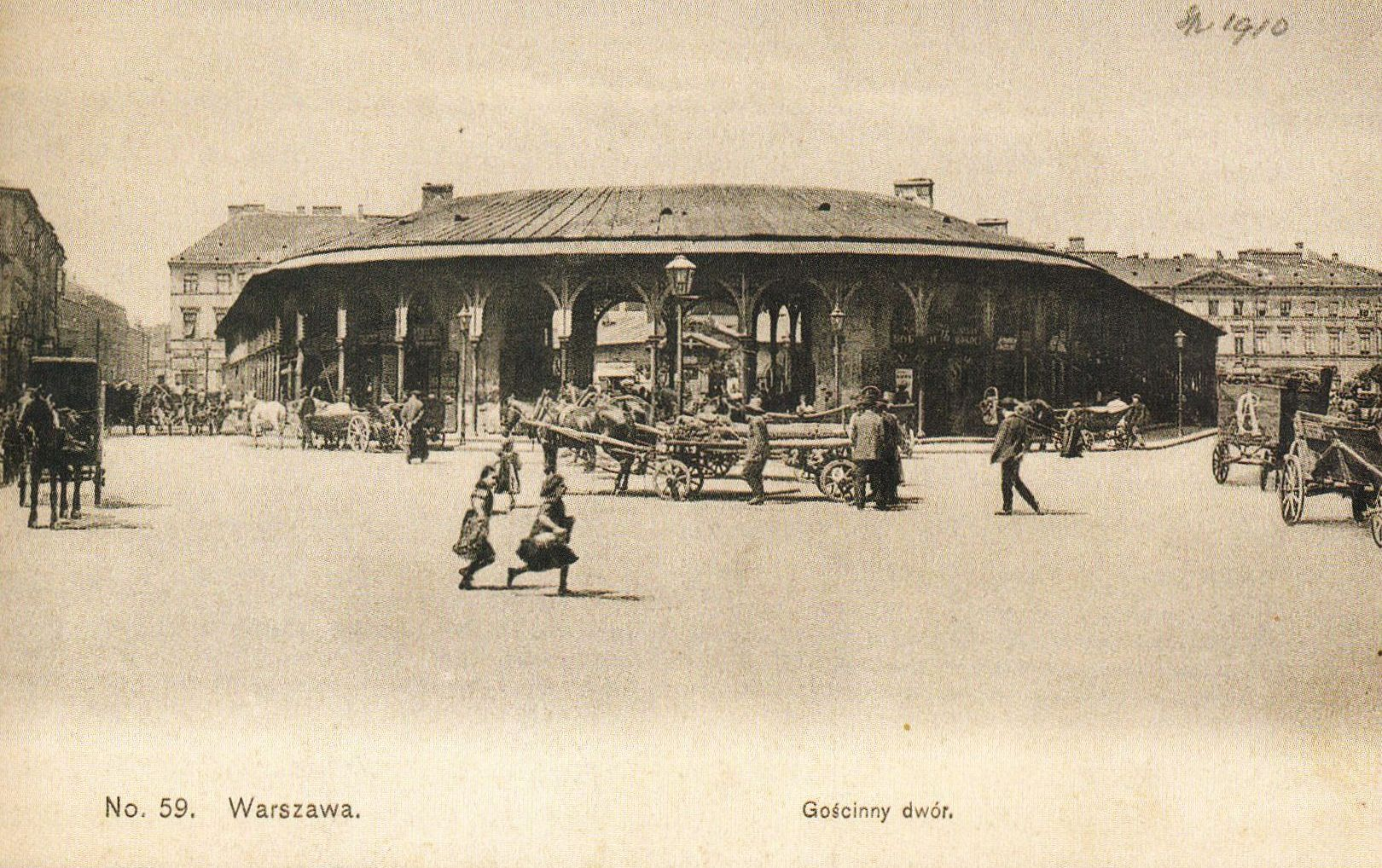
- The Guest Court in 1908.
- Interactive map of the Guest Court area

General information
- Type: Market hall
- Location: Downtown, Warsaw, Poland, Iron Gate Square
- Coordinates: 52°14′23″N 21°00′09″E
- Completed: October 1841
- Destroyed: September 1939

Technical details
- Floor count: 2

Design and construction
- Architects: Jan Jakub Gay; Alfons Kropiwnicki
- Developer: Administrative Council

The Guest Court (Polish: Gościnny Dwór) was a market hall in Warsaw, Poland, operating between 1841 and 1939. It was located in the neighbourhood of North Downtown, at the intersection of Rynkowa and Skórzana Streets and the Iron Gate Square.

== History ==
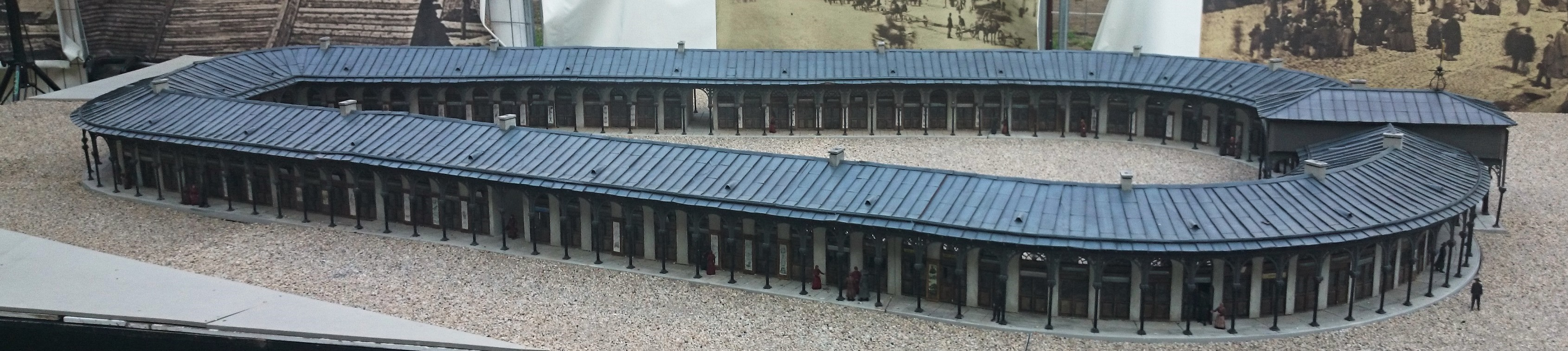
The scale replica of the Guest Court

The Guest Court was commissioned by the Administrative Council and designed by Jan Jakub Gay and Alfons Kropiwnicki. It was constructed in October 1841 next to the Iron Gate Square to help organize trade in the town of Wielopole. It was named after the Russian-language term gostiny dvor (Cyrylic: гостиный двор; original spelling: Гостинный дворъ), referring to numerous retail buildings in the Russian Empire. It had the shape of a isosceles triangle with curved corners and a circumference of around 280 m. It was built from bricks, with a zinc roof and arcades made with cast iron.

The building contained 168 small stores and another 168 market stalls. In 1916, the courtyard was placed under a glass roof.

It was destroyed in September 1939 in the arial bombings during the Siege of Warsaw. It was not reconstructed; materials salvaged from its ruins were used as scrap by the German military.
