= Fragments of the ghetto walls in Warsaw =

Fragments of walls

Fragments of the ghetto walls in Warsaw are fragments of the walls between properties or the walls of pre-war buildings marking the border between the Warsaw Ghetto and the "Aryan" part of the city after November 16, 1940.

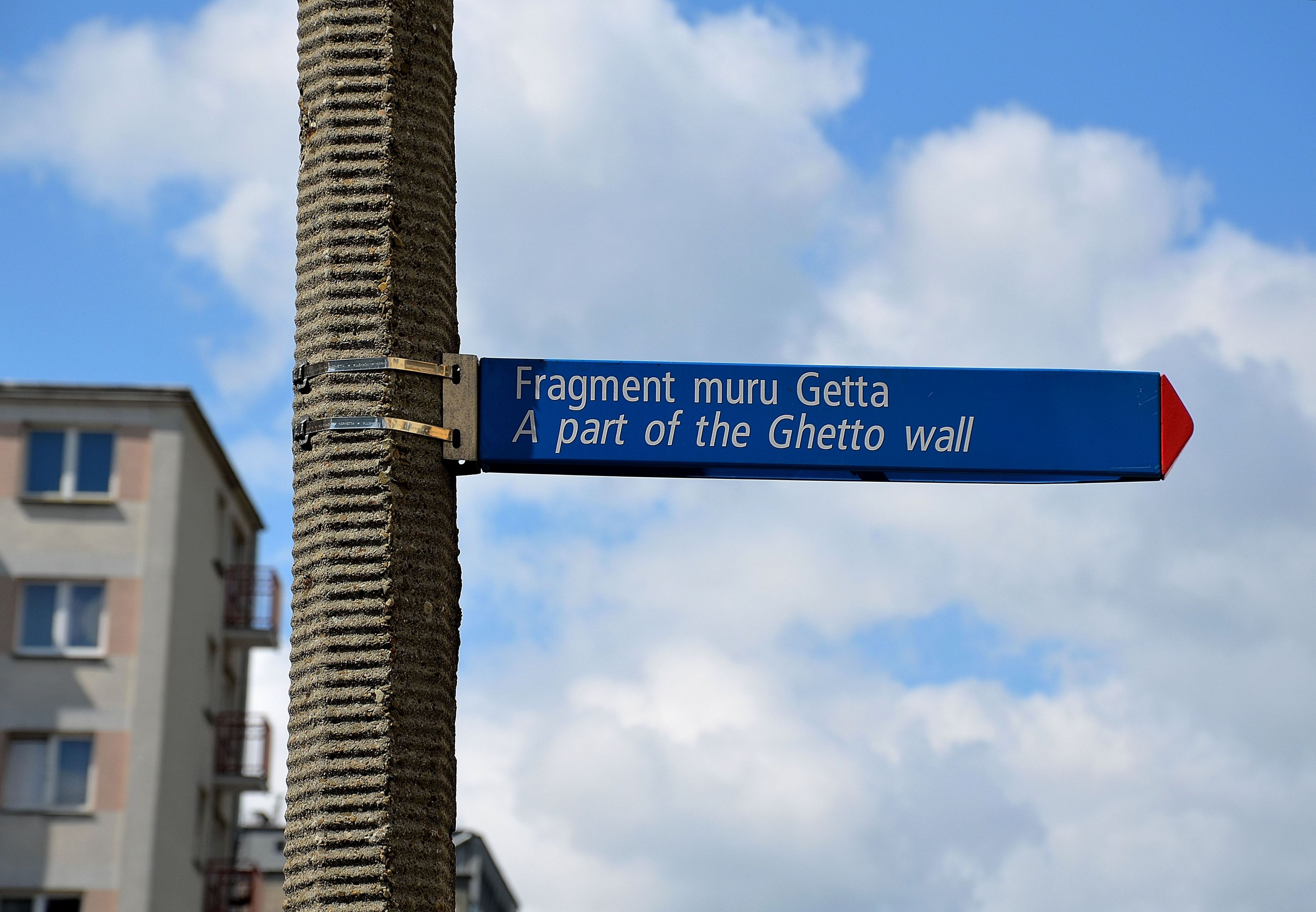
An MSI indicator at 62 Złota Street

The total length of the ghetto wall in 1940 was about 18 km. After the end of World War II, the freestanding walls of the Jewish district, which survived the Ghetto Uprising and the Warsaw Uprising, were largely demolished. Few fragments of the walls running between the properties have been preserved, as well as the walls of the pre-war buildings that marked the border of the ghetto. The three best known parts of the Warsaw Ghetto wall are located in the former small ghetto, in the courtyards of the tenement houses at 55 Sienna and 62 Złota Streets, and at 11 Waliców Street.

== Locations ==
- 55 Sienna Street – the border of the ghetto was marked by the wall between Sienna 53 and 55 estates, which existed before 1940, the wall is about 3 meters high. A commemorative plaque is located on its western side. It has been placed here thanks to the initiator of the commemoration, Mieczysław Jędruszczak. There is a cavity of two bricks in the wall, which were transported to the Holocaust Museum in Washington in 1989 (a copy of this fragment of the wall can also be seen in this museum). On the eastern ("Aryan") side, currently in the Henryk Sienkiewicz XII High School courtyard, is a monument to the borders of the ghetto, unveiled in January 2010. Access to the fragment of the ghetto wall on Sienna 55 is possible from the side of 62 Złota Street. The city authorities undertook actions in 2017 to renovate the wall and its surroundings. The wall will be accessible from the side of the High School in 2018. A didactic and historical zone will also be created on John Paul II Avenue.
- 62 Złota Street – the wall of the ghetto is a fragment of the wall of a pre-war building, about 6 meters high. It contains, among other things, a commemorative plaque unveiled on May 26, 1992 by the President of Israel Chaim Herzog during his official visit to Poland, as well as a plan of the Warsaw Ghetto. Individual bricks from this part of the wall were taken to the Museum of the History of the Holocaust in Yad Vashem, Jerusalem, and to the museums in Houston and Melbourne.
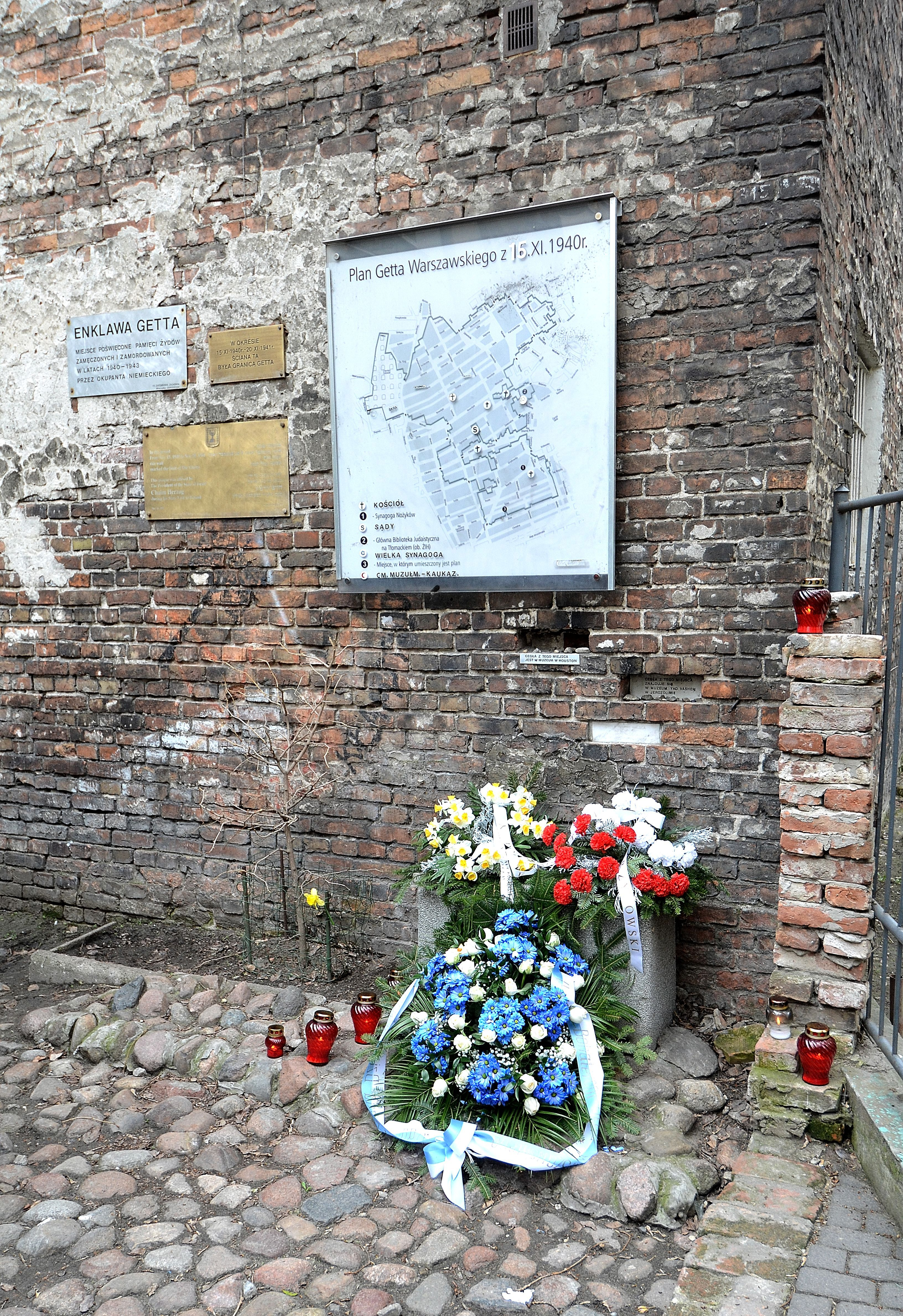
- Plaques on the fragment of the ghetto wall at 62 Złota Street
  11 Waliców Street – The preserved wall of the building belonging to the former brewery of Herman Jung was the border of the ghetto from November 1940 to August 1942, between 1999 and 2000 it was integrated into the Aurum office building.
- Jewish cemetery – from November 1940 until the exclusion of the necropolis from the ghetto in December 1941, the boundary of the closed district was the existing cemetery wall on the side of Młynarska, Smętna, Spokojna, Kolska Streets and the northern part of the cemetery wall on Okopowa Street.
- The Municipal Court buildings in Leszno (formerly 53/55 Leszno Street, now the Regional Court, 127 Solidarności Avenue) – the side walls (from the north, east and west) together with the walls closing the inner courtyards of the Courts, not included in the ghetto, marked the border of the closed district from November 1940 to August 1942.
- 41 Chłodna Street – from November 1940 to December 1941 the side wall of this tenement house was a fragment of the western border of the small ghetto, running at the back of the property at Wronia Street.
- 4/28 Krochmalna Street – from November 1940 to December 1941 the side wall of this tenement house was a fragment of the northern border of the small ghetto.
- 55 Ogrodowa Street – from November 1940 to December 1941 the side wall of this tenement house was a fragment of the western border of the small ghetto, running at the back of the property at Wronia Street.
- 78 Okopowa Street – a fragment of the wall surrounding the buildings of the Temler and Szwede Tanner Factory (from the side of the petrol station at Stawki Street, straight from the exit of Smocza Street) was also the ghetto wall for the entire period of the closed district's existence.
- 10 Stawki Street – there is a fragment of the ghetto wall at the back of the Secondary and Economic School Complex No. 1, which was the border of Umschlagplatz. In 2014, the wall was dismantled and reconstructed after the bricks had been cleaned.
- Świętojerska Street, corner of Nowiniarska Street – the border of the ghetto was marked here by a wall, a small part of which is located at the entrance to the underground car park at the back of the Supreme Court building.

== Bibliography ==
- Maps: Getto warszawskie. Współczesny układ ulic i ostańce zabudowy według stanu na marzec 2001 na tle dawnego planu miasta, opracowanie kartograficzne Paweł E. Weszpiński, współczesna treść tematyczna (przebieg ulic i ostańce) Robert Marcinkowski; Getto warszawskie. Granice przed wielką akcją likwidacyjną, opracowanie kartograficzne Paweł E. Weszpiński [w:] Barbara Engelking, Jacek Leociak: Getto warszawskie – przewodnik po nieistniejącym mieście. Warszawa: Wydawnictwo IFiS PAN, 2001.

== Gallery ==
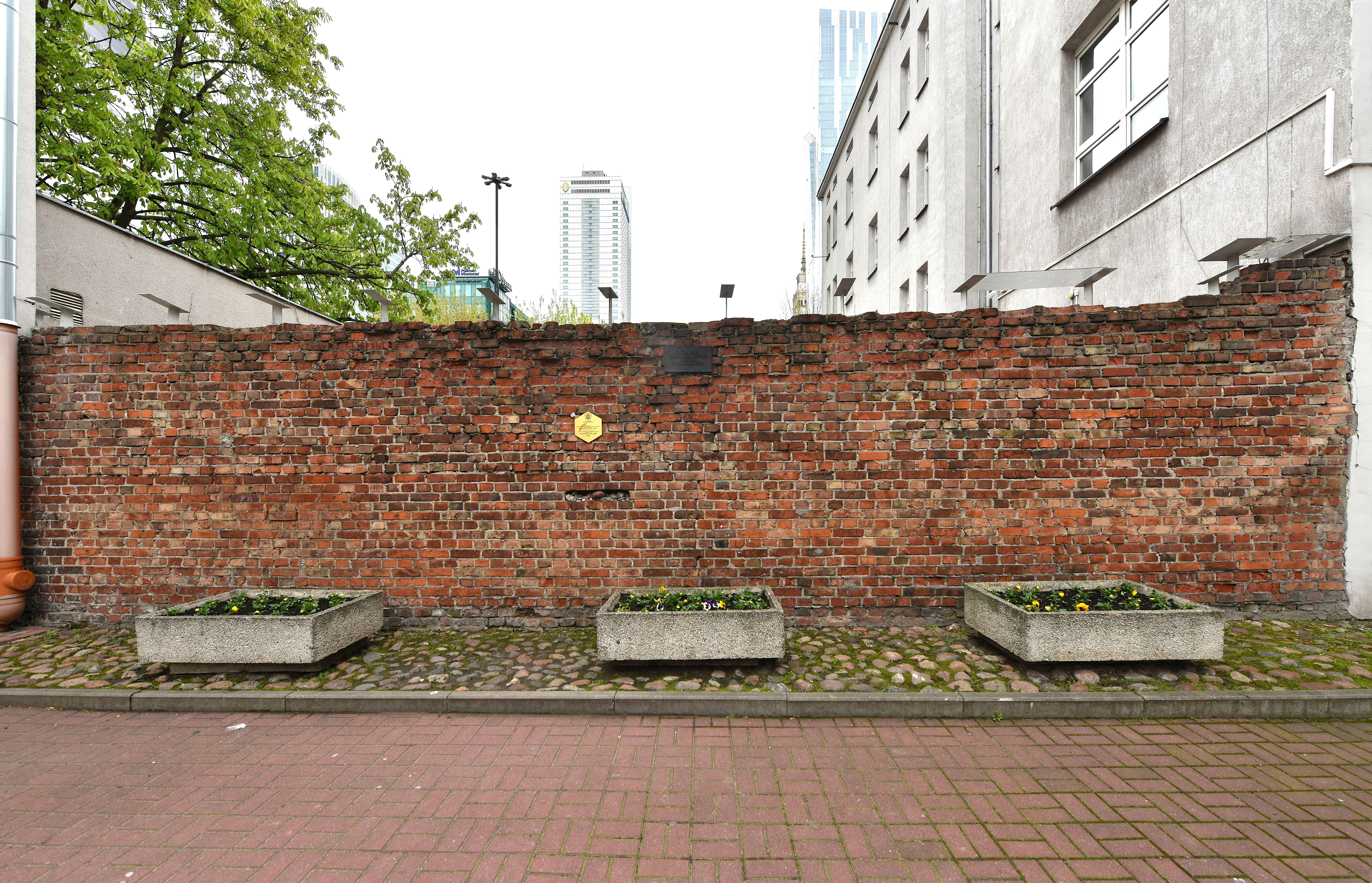
55 Sienna Street

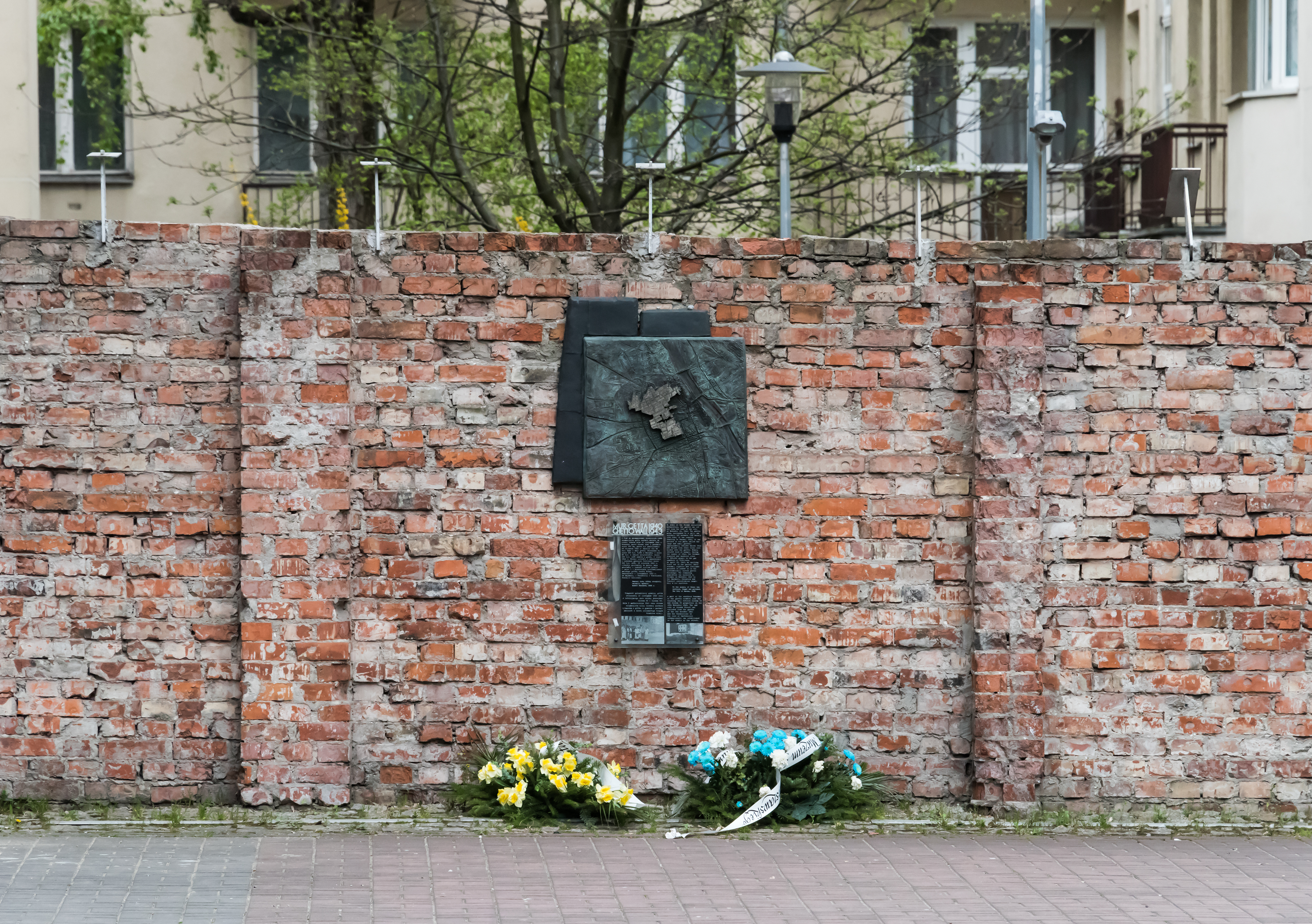
Commemoration of the wall at 55 Sienna Street

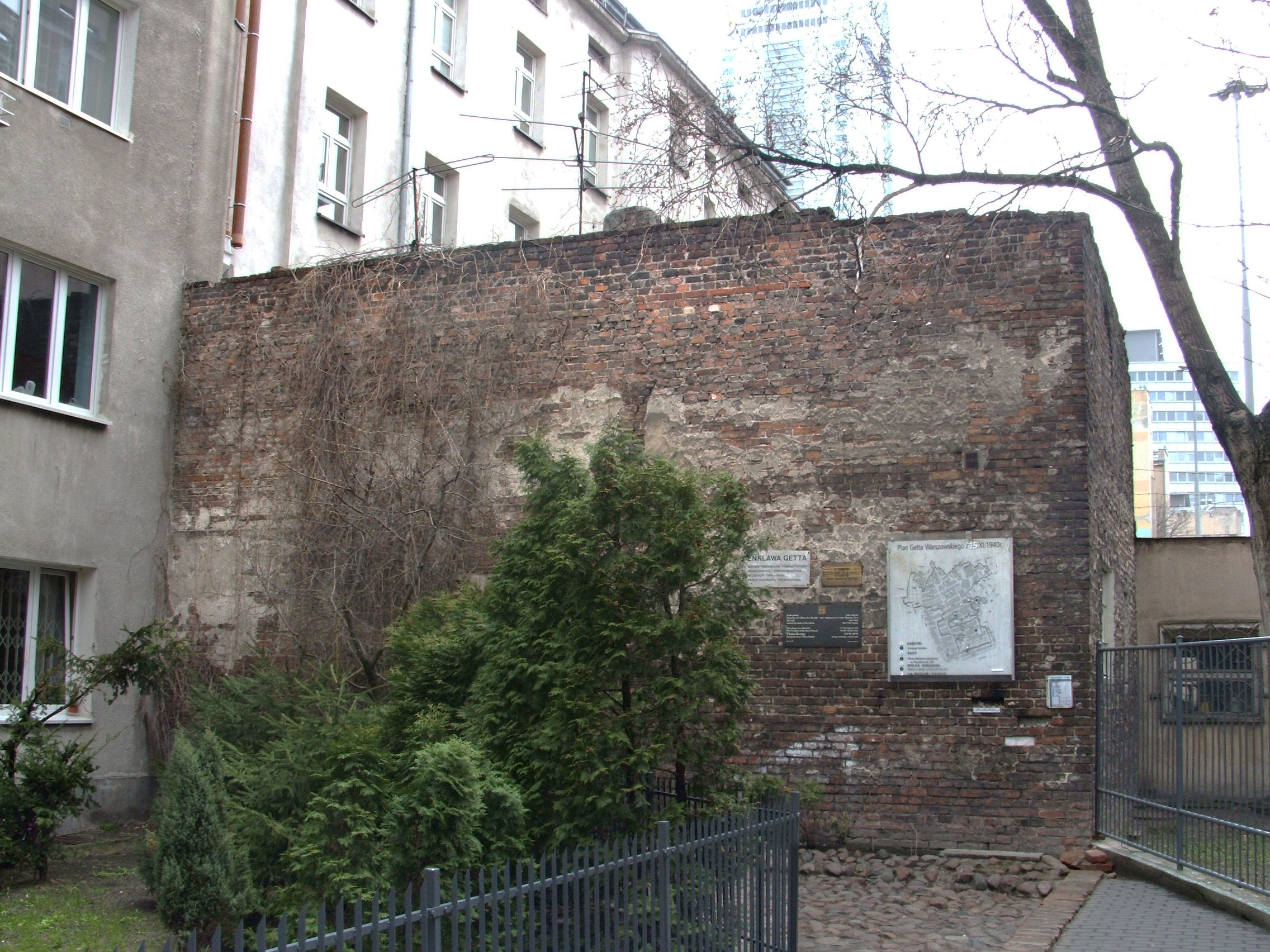
62 Złota Street

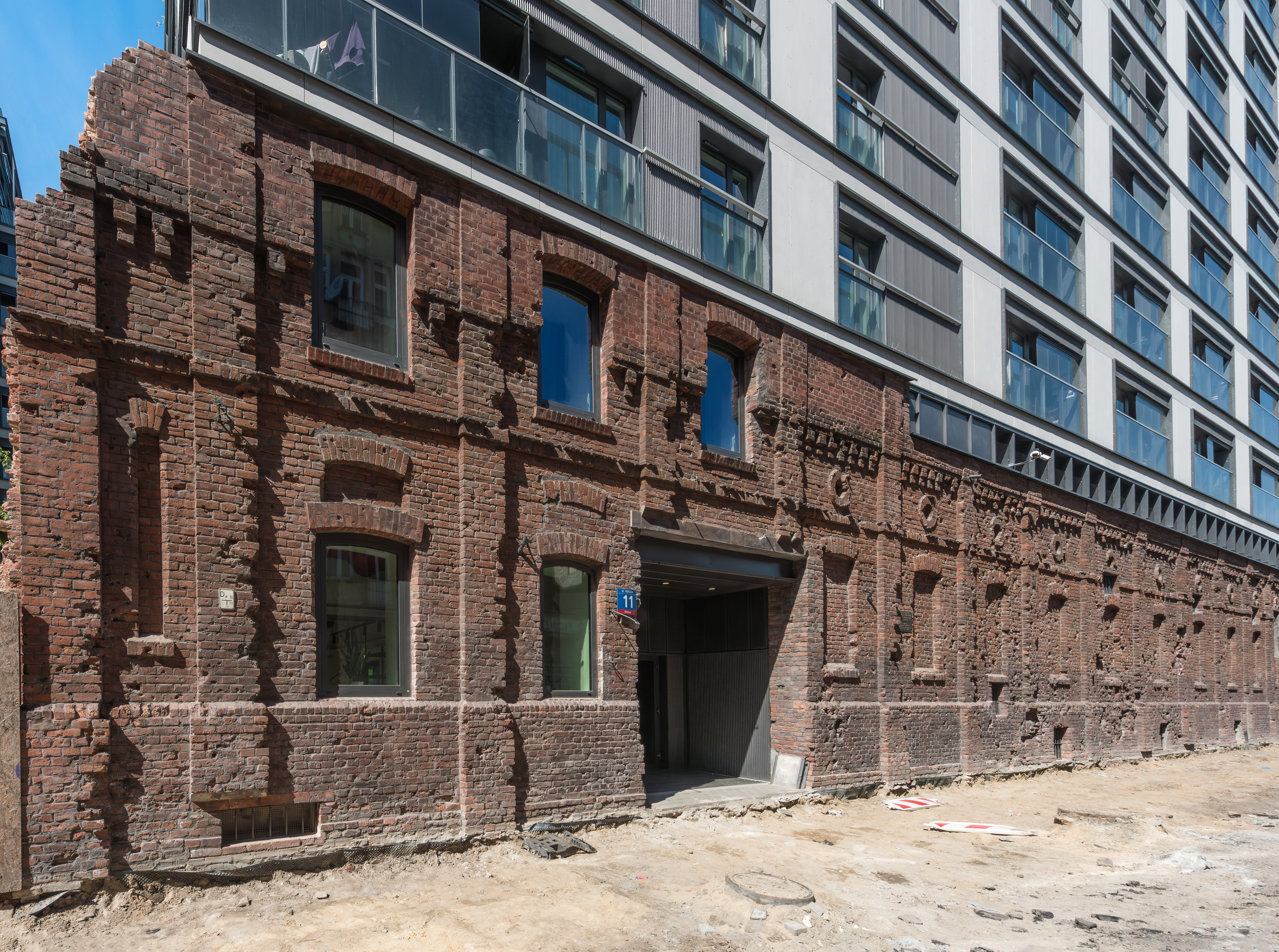
11 Waliców Street

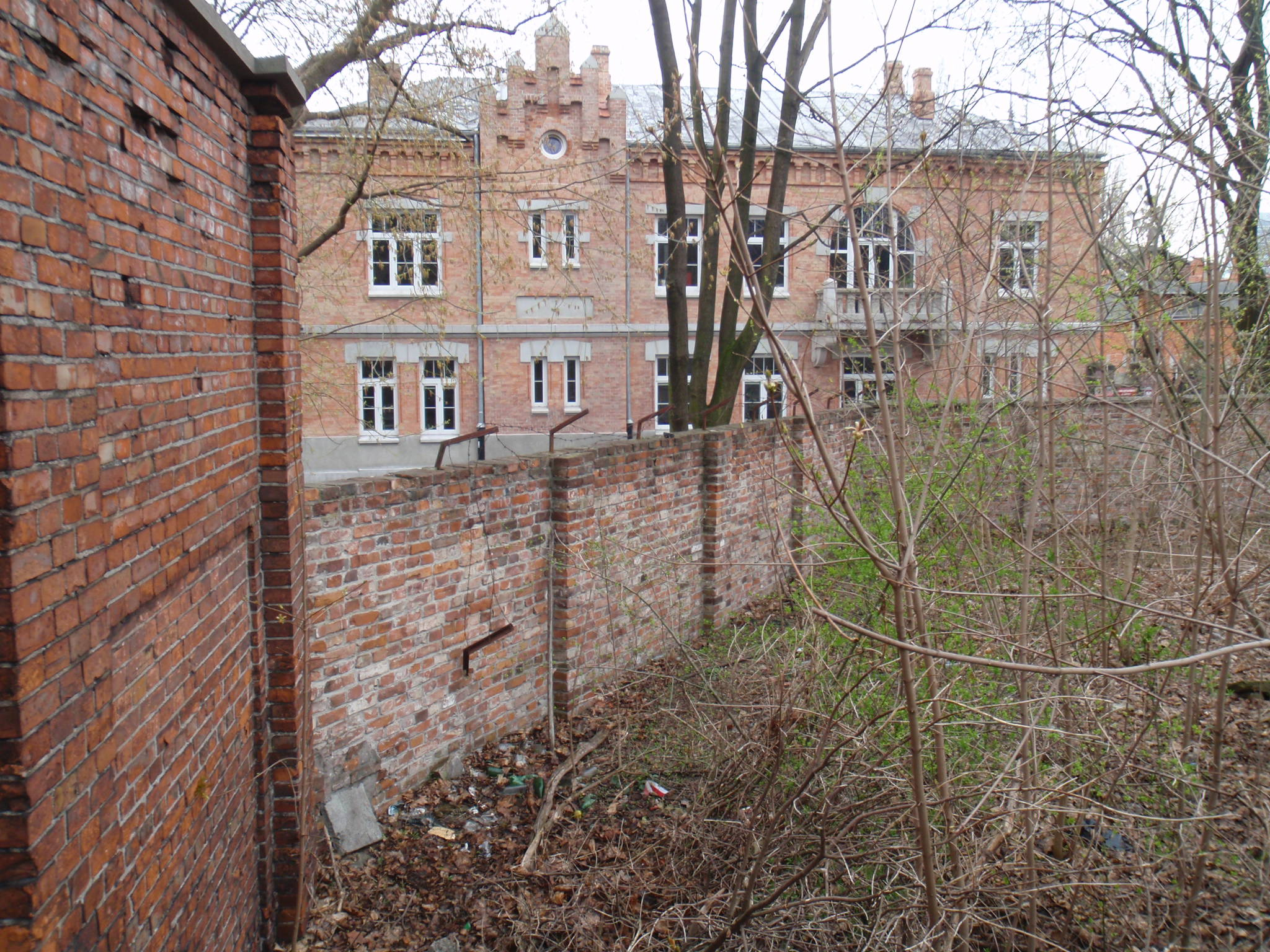
The wall of the Jewish cemetery on Spokojna Street

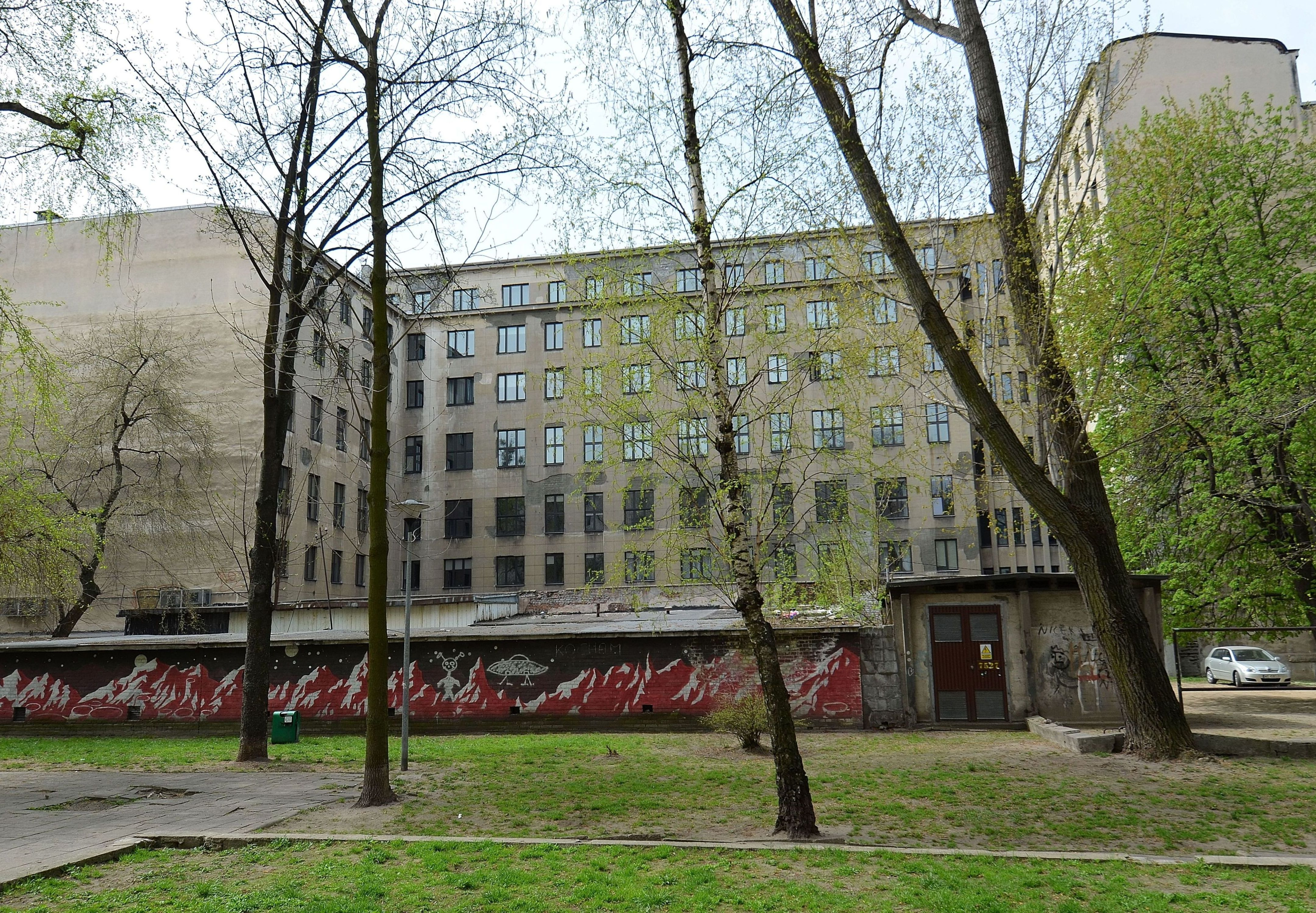
The Municipal Court buildings (view from the east)

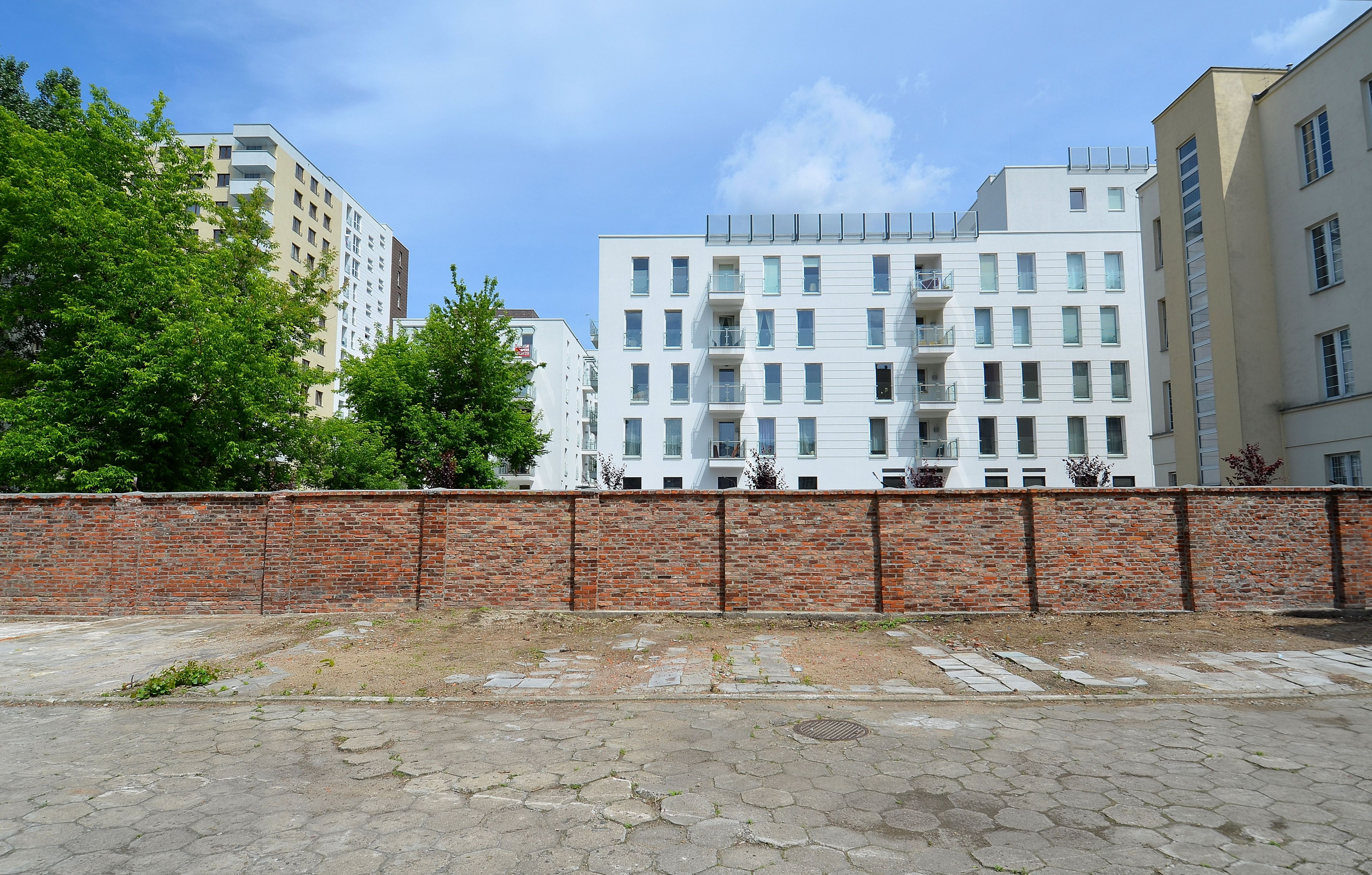
The back of the Complex of High Schools and Economics No. 1 at 10 Stawki Street
