= Społem =

Polish consumers' co-operative of local grocery stores

PSS Społem
- Company type: Consumers' co-operative
- Industry: Retail
- Founded: 1868; 158 years ago
- Number of locations: 2400
- Area served: Poland
- Website: www.spolem.org.pl

PSS Społem is a Polish consumers' co-operative of local grocery stores, founded in 1868.

During the Partitions of Poland, each of the branches of PSS Społem was formed under different conditions in law, economy and politics. The common character of the consumers' co-operative was patriotism, providing economic and political security against the Partition Powers of the Kingdom of Prussia, Habsburg Austria and the Russian Empire. In 1869, the first consumer co-operatives were established: Merkury in Warsaw, Oszczędność in Radom, and Zgoda in Płock. The idea behind the name of the co-operative chain was Stefan Żeromski, who published the first fortnightly journal propagating the need for co-operation, published in 1906.

During the Polish People's Republic, PSS Społem built a number of modernist grocery stores, inter alia in: Spółdzielczy Dom Handlowy Zenit in Katowice (1962), SDH Central in Łódź (1972), SDH Skarbek in Katowice (1975).

== Gallery ==
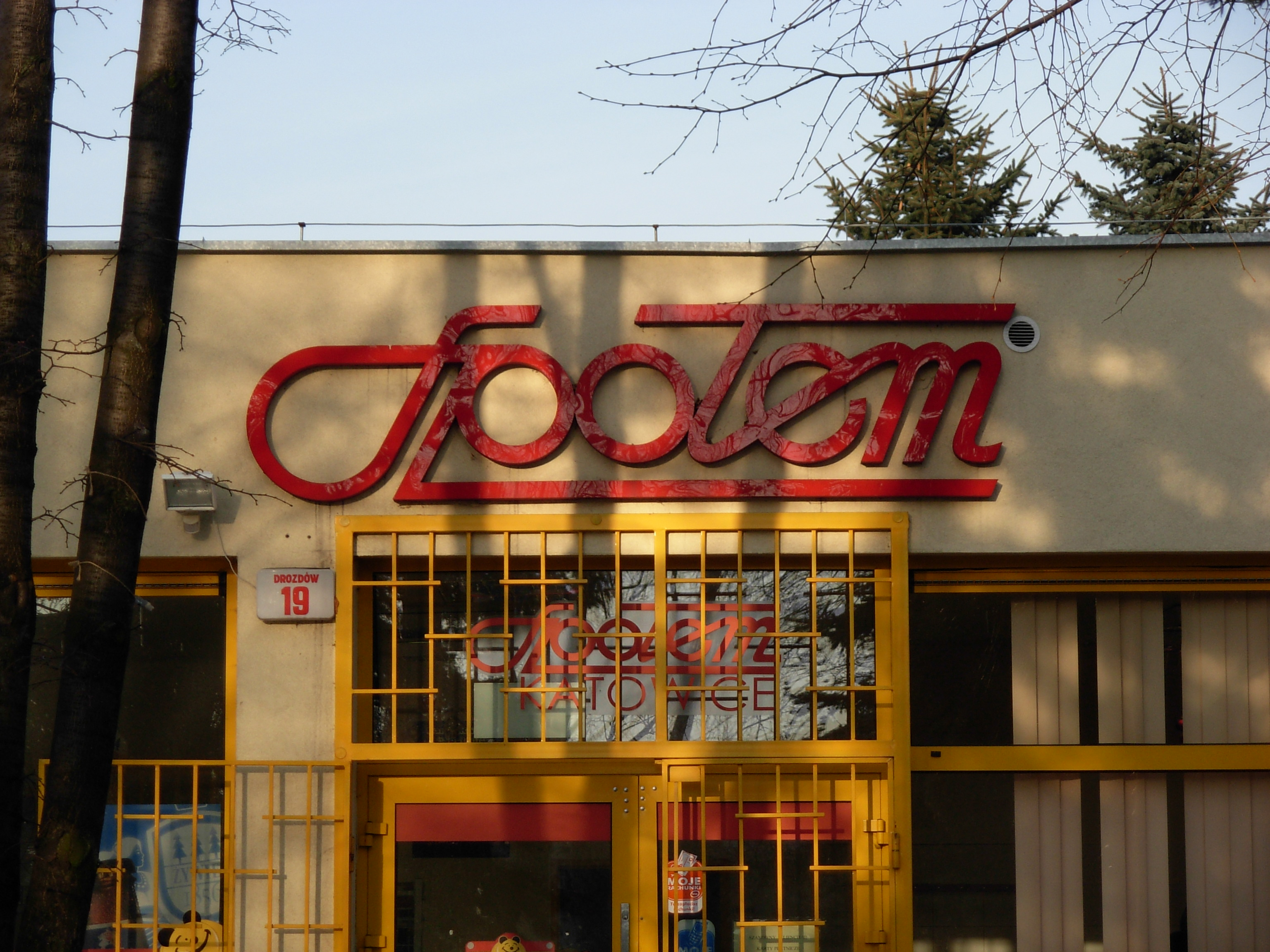
Społem in Brynów, Katowice.

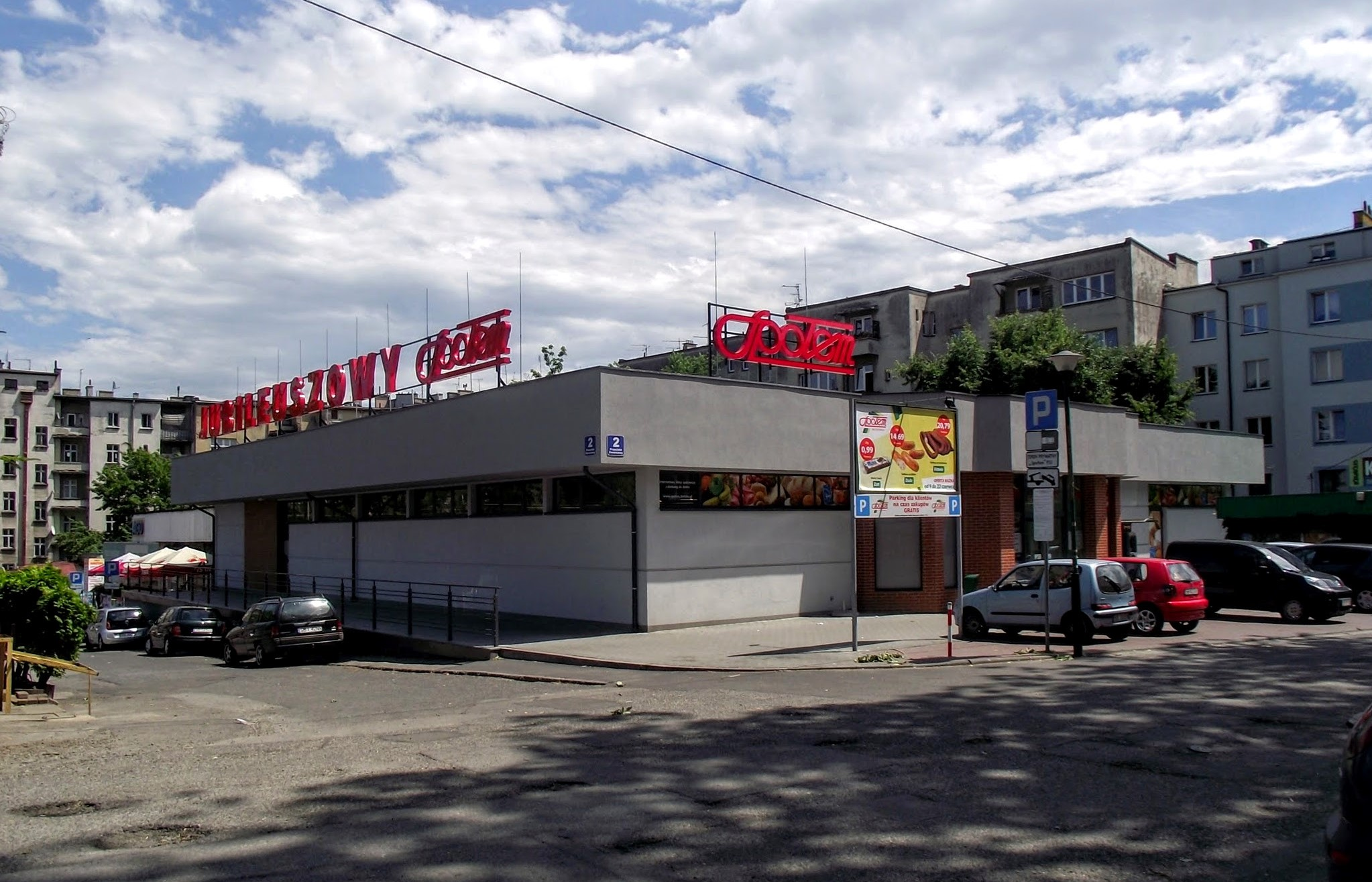
Społem in Bielsko-Biała.

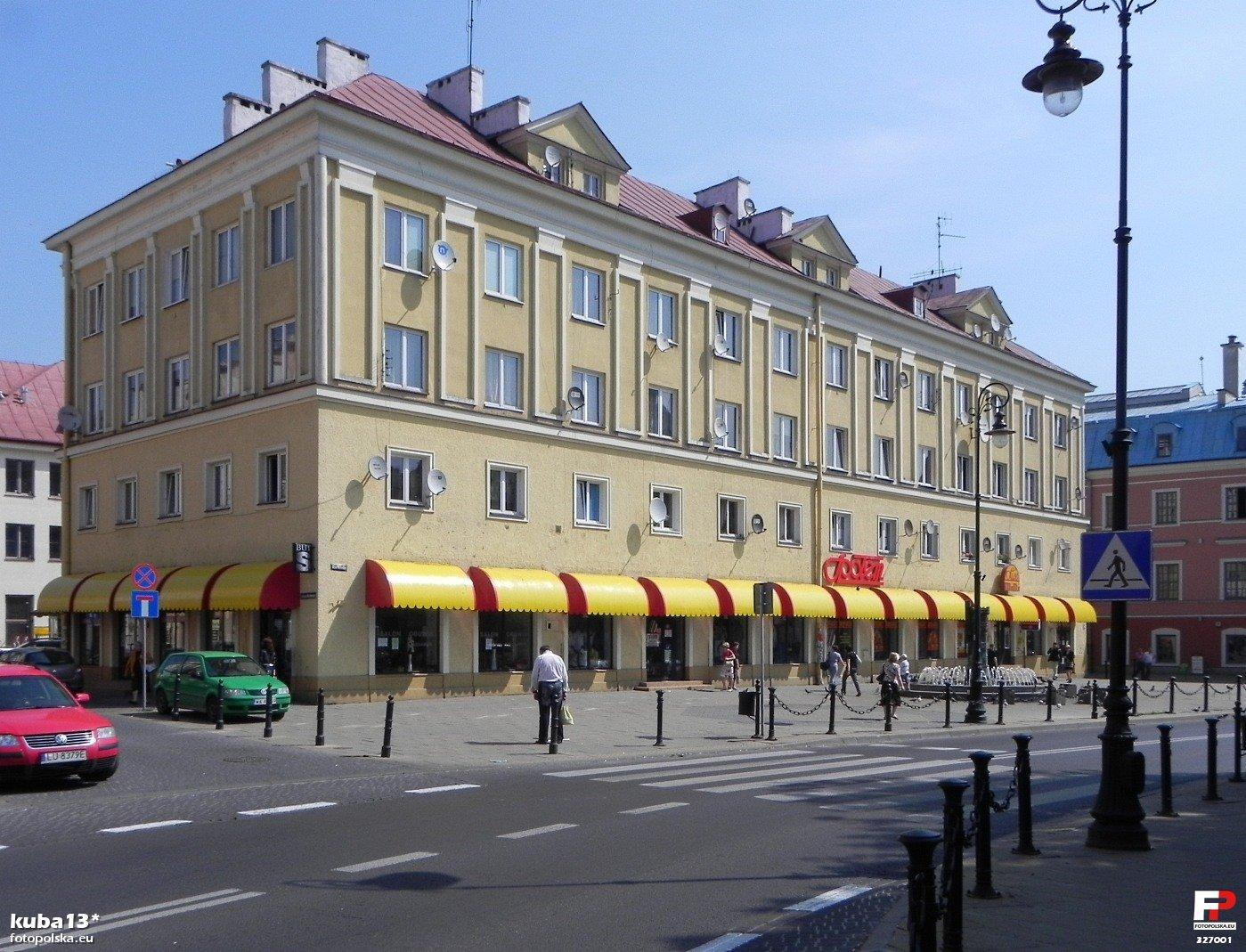
Społem in Lublin.

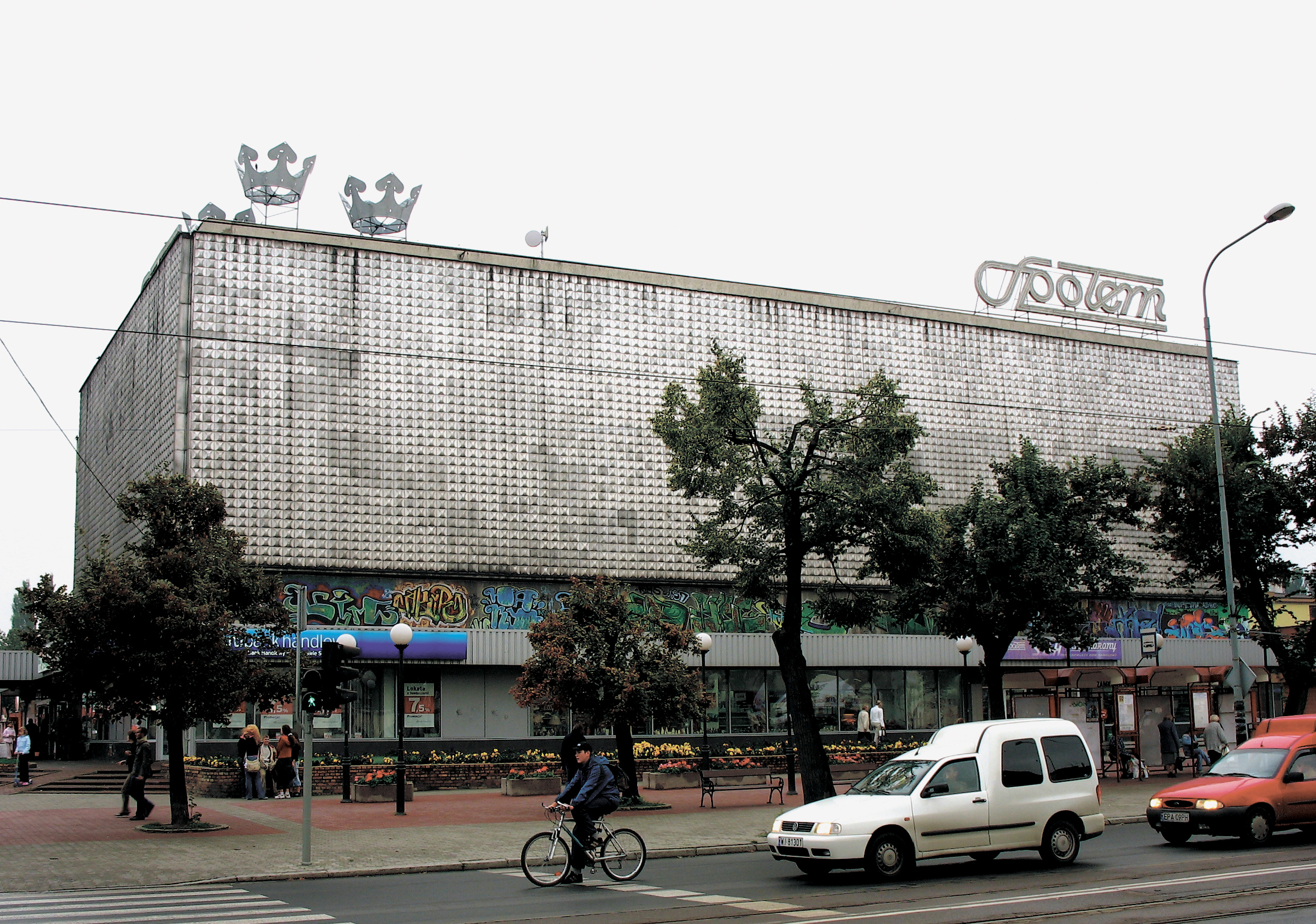
Społem in Pabianice.

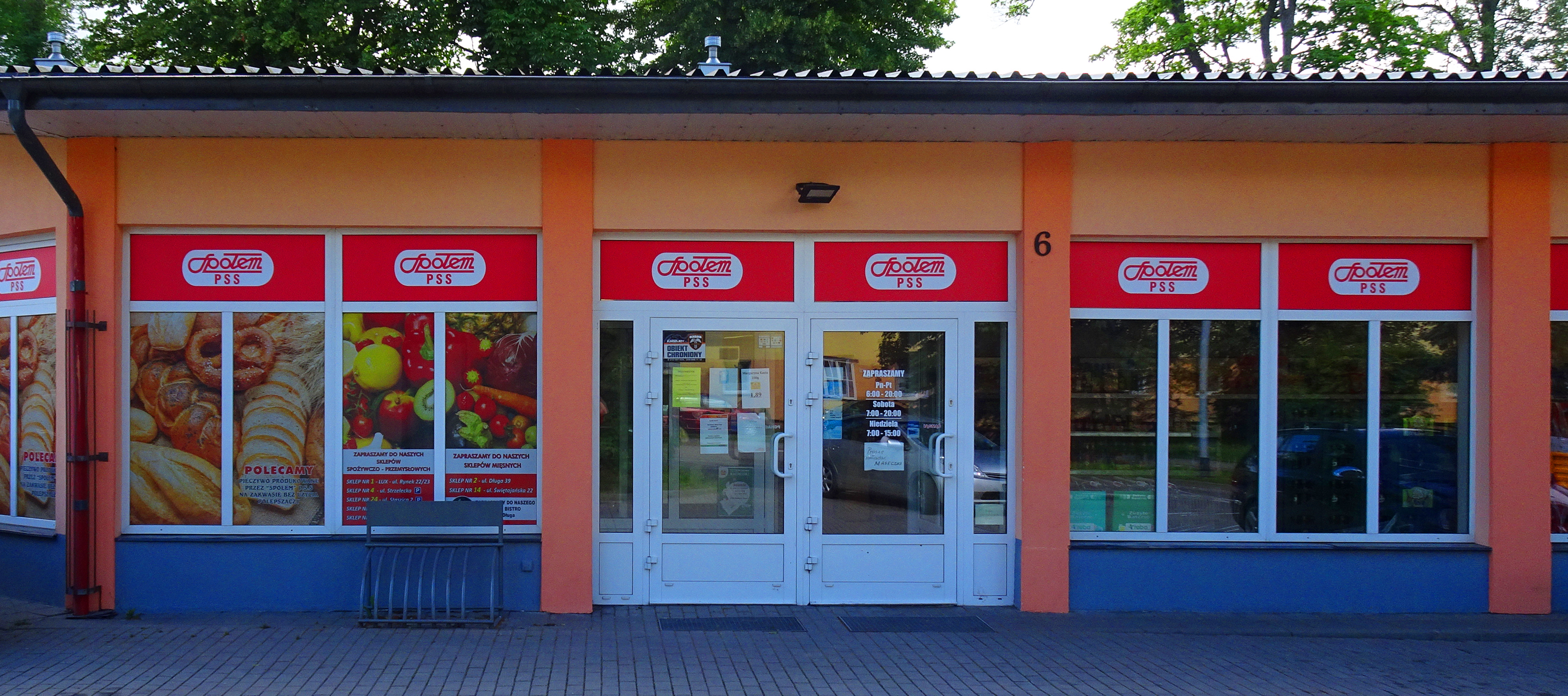
Społem in Kościerzyna.

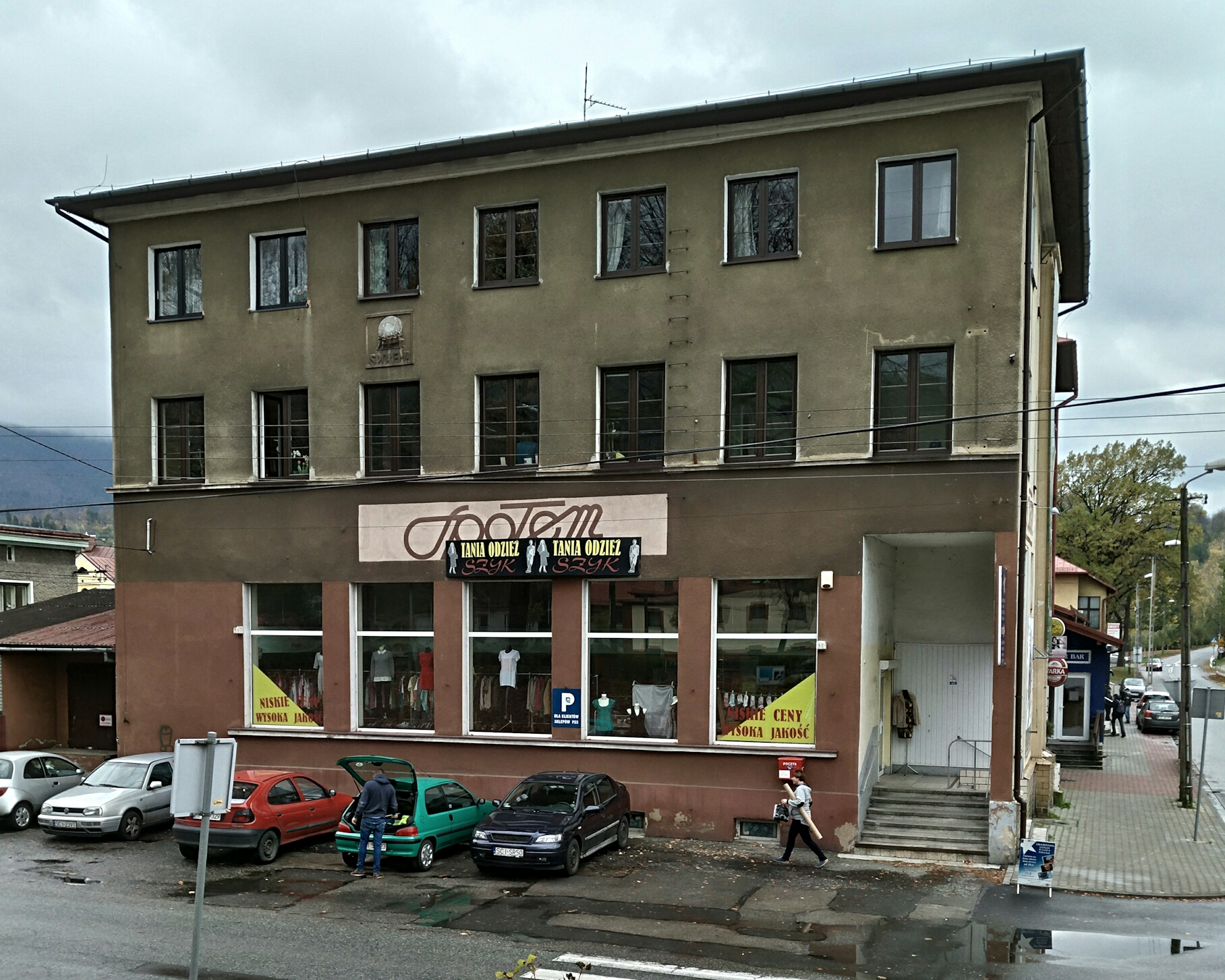
Społem in Ustroń.

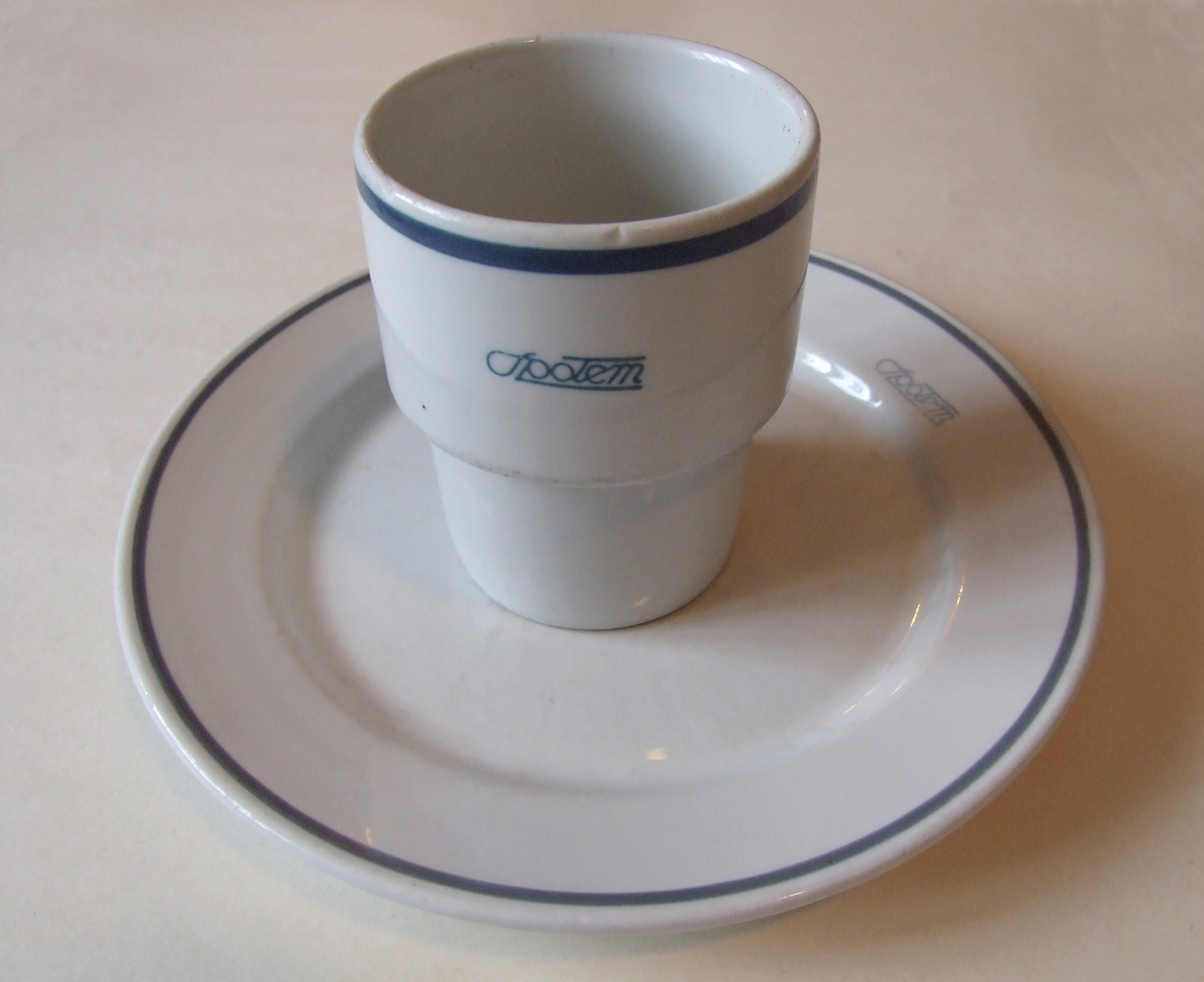
Społem tableware from the early 1980s.

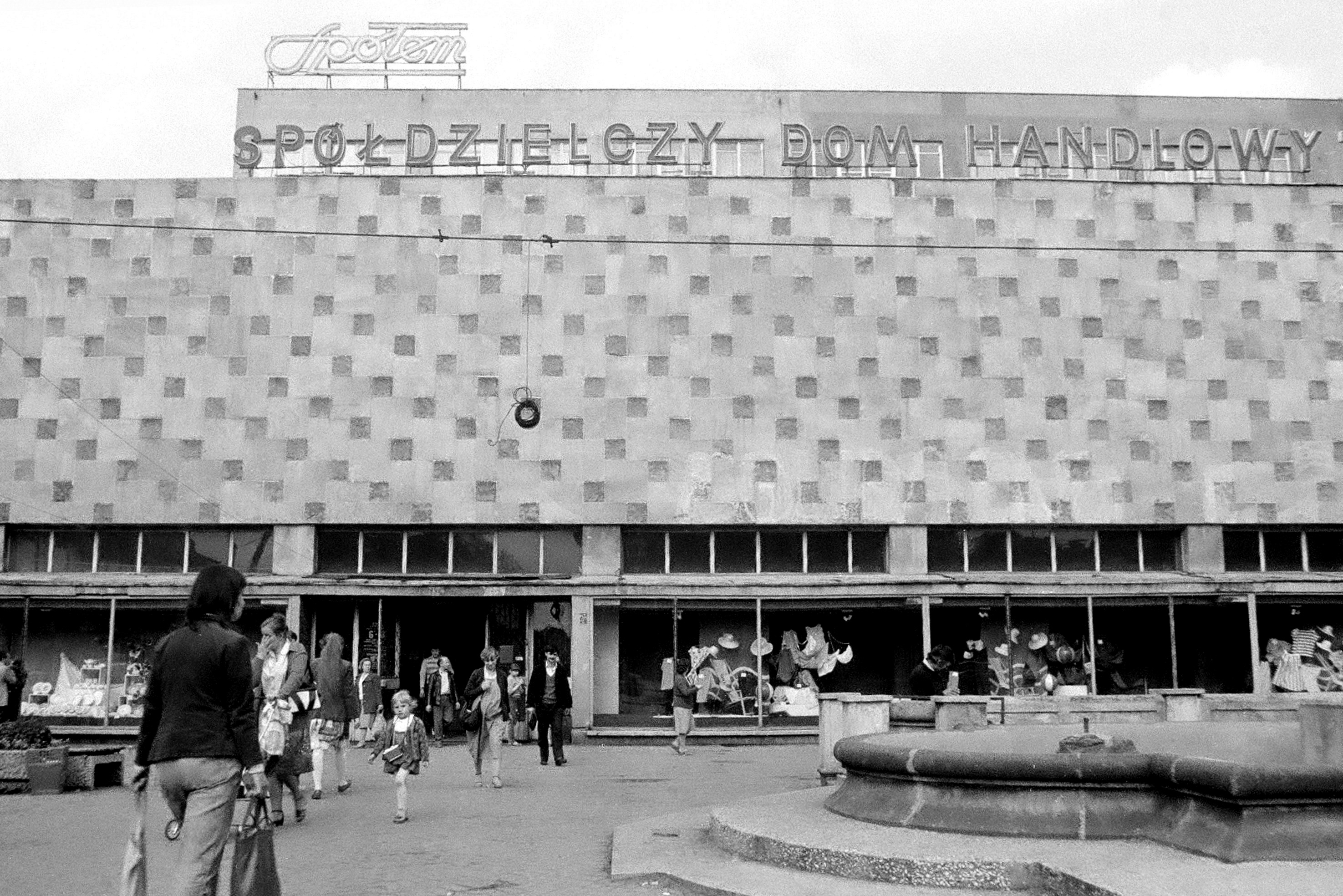
Spółdzielczy Dom Handlowy Kokos in Gorzów Wielkopolski in 1985.

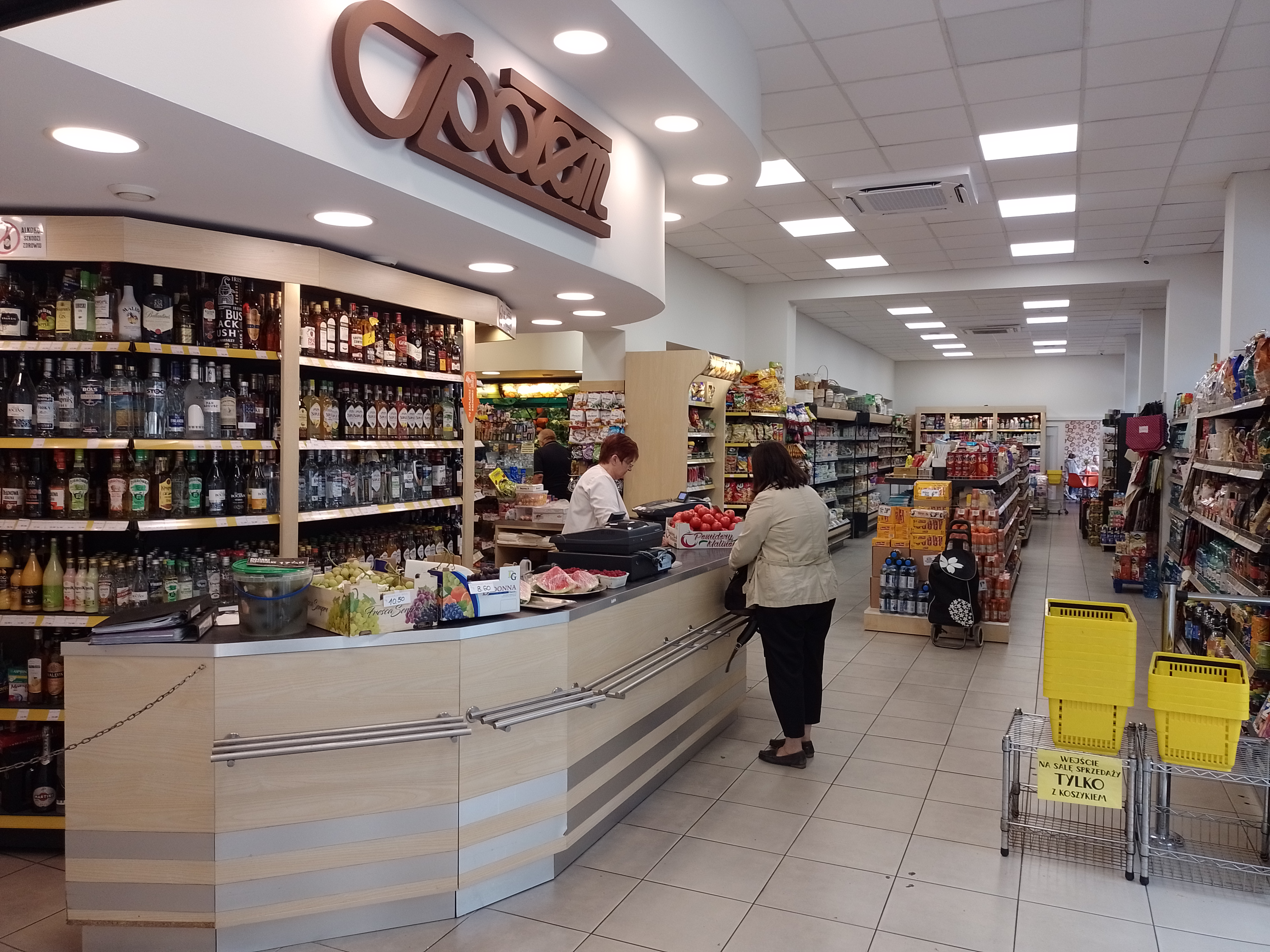
Interior of a Społem location in Cieszyn.
