= Mier =

Mier might refer to one of the following:

== Places ==
- Mier, Asturias, parish in northern Spain
- Ciudad Mier, city and municipality in northern Mexico
  - Mier Expedition, from the Republic of Texas into Mexico, 1842-43
- Mier, Indiana, community in the U.S.
- Mier Local Municipality, in South Africa
- Mier Barracks, a historic building in Warsaw, Poland
- Mier Halls, market halls in Warsaw, Poland
- Mier Park, an urban park in Warsaw, Poland

== People ==
- Francisco Mier y Torre, 18th-century governor of the New Kingdom of León
- Henry Mier, Uruguayan footballer
- Manuel Mier y Terán, 19th-century Mexican general
- Servando Teresa de Mier, 18th- and 19th-century Catholic priest of New Spain
- Hiram Mier, Mexican footballer
- Wilhelm Mier, 18th-century Polish military officer and statesman

== Other ==
- Manchester Independent Economic Review (MIER)
- Mirów, Warsaw, a neighbourhood in Warsaw, Poland, named after Wilhelm Mier
- Crown Horse Guard Regiment, informally known as Mier Guard, an 18th-century cavalry unit of the Crown Army of the Polish–Lithuanian Commonwealth
