= Mier Park =

Urban park in Warsaw, Poland

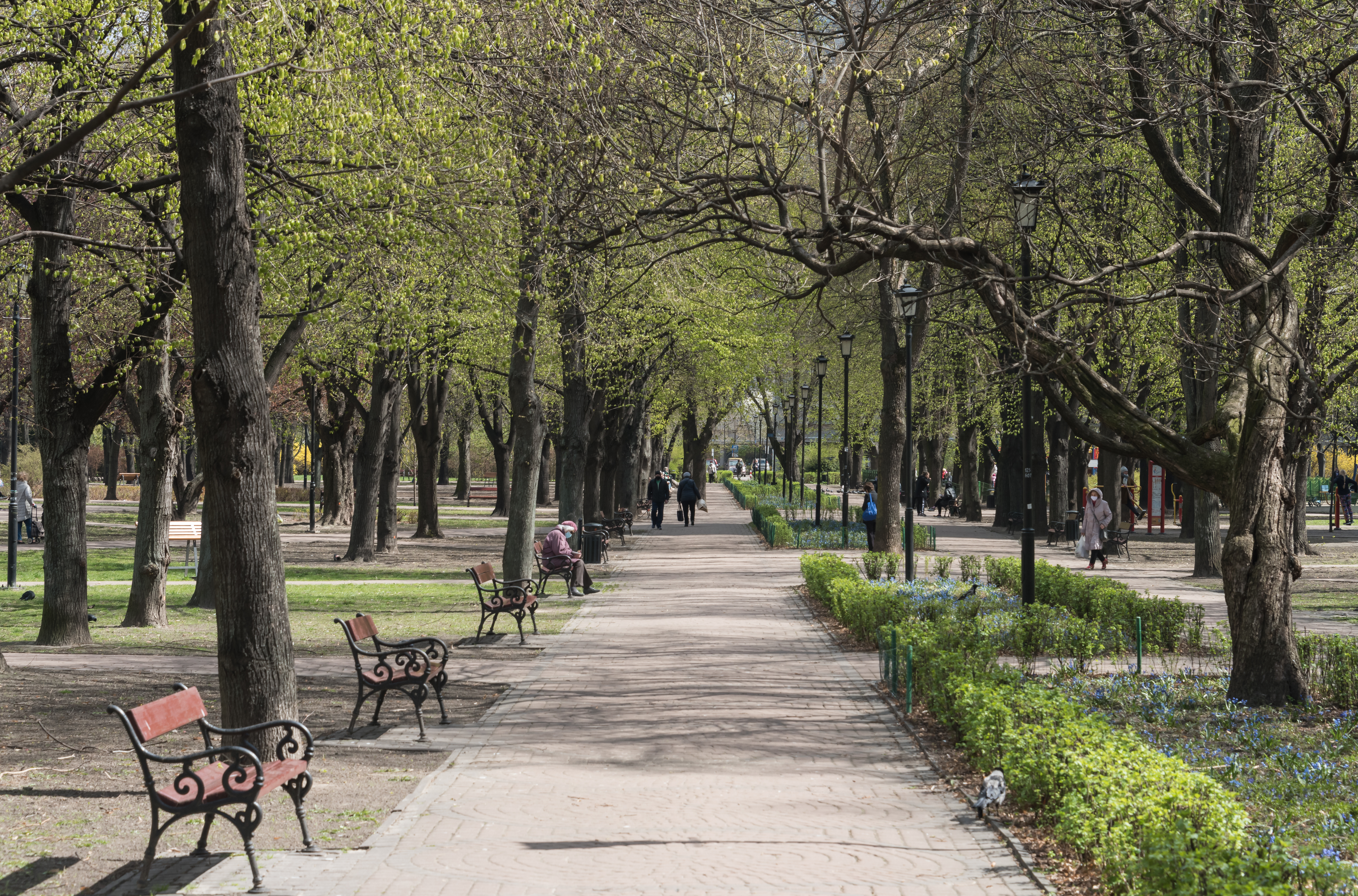
- Mier Park in 2021.
- Interactive map of Mier Park
- Type: Urban park
- Location: Warsaw, Poland
- Coordinates: 52°14′18.456″N 21°00′00.486″E
- Area: 5.35 hectares (13.2 acres)
- Created: 1960s

The Mier Park (English: /mjə(ɹ)/; Polish pronunciation: [ˈmjɛr]; Polish: Park Mirowski), also known as the Downtown Park (Polish: Park Śródmiejski), is an urban park in Warsaw, Poland, within the Downtown district. It is placed in the neighbourhood of North Downtown, between John Paul II Avenue, Marshal Street, Mier Halls, and the neighbourhood of Za Żelazną Bramą.

== Name ==
The Mier Park was named after the nearby Mier Halls and Mier Square, which in turn were named after the Mier Barracks, built there in the 18th century. They in turn were named after Wilhelm Mier, who was the commanding officer of the Crown Horse Guard Regiment stationed there.

It is also alternatively known as the Downtown Park (Polish: Park Śródmiejski), due to its location in the Downtown district, and relatively close placement to the city centre.

== History ==
The Mier Park was opened in the 1960s.

In June 1968 in the park was unveiled the moment of Julian Marchlewski, a communist politician and revolutionary, who was the chairperson of the Provisional Polish Revolutionary Committee. It was deconstructed in 1990.

On 21 May 2019 in the park was unveiled the monument of Feliks Stamm, a 20th-century boxing champion. The monument was placed next to the East Hall of the Mier Halls, where five Polish boxers won gold medals at the 1953 European Amateur Boxing Championships. The monument was made by sculptor Lubomir Grigorov.

On 2 March 2023, in the park was unveiled the monument of Piotr Drzewicki who was the mayor of Warsaw from 1917 to 1921.

== Characteristics ==
The Mier Park has the form of a long and thin rectangular strip of land between Jana Pawła II Avenue and Marszałkowska Street. Its central pathway is Piotra Drzewieckiego Avenue. The park has the total area of 5.35 ha.

It borders the Mier Square and Mier Halls to the north, the Iron Gate Square to the north-east, and Za Żelazną Bramą neighbourhood to the south.

In the park are located the monument to Feliks Stamm by Lubomir Grigorov, the monument to Piotr Drzewicki, and the sculpture of Mermaid of Warsaw by Ryszard Kozłowski.

== Gallery ==
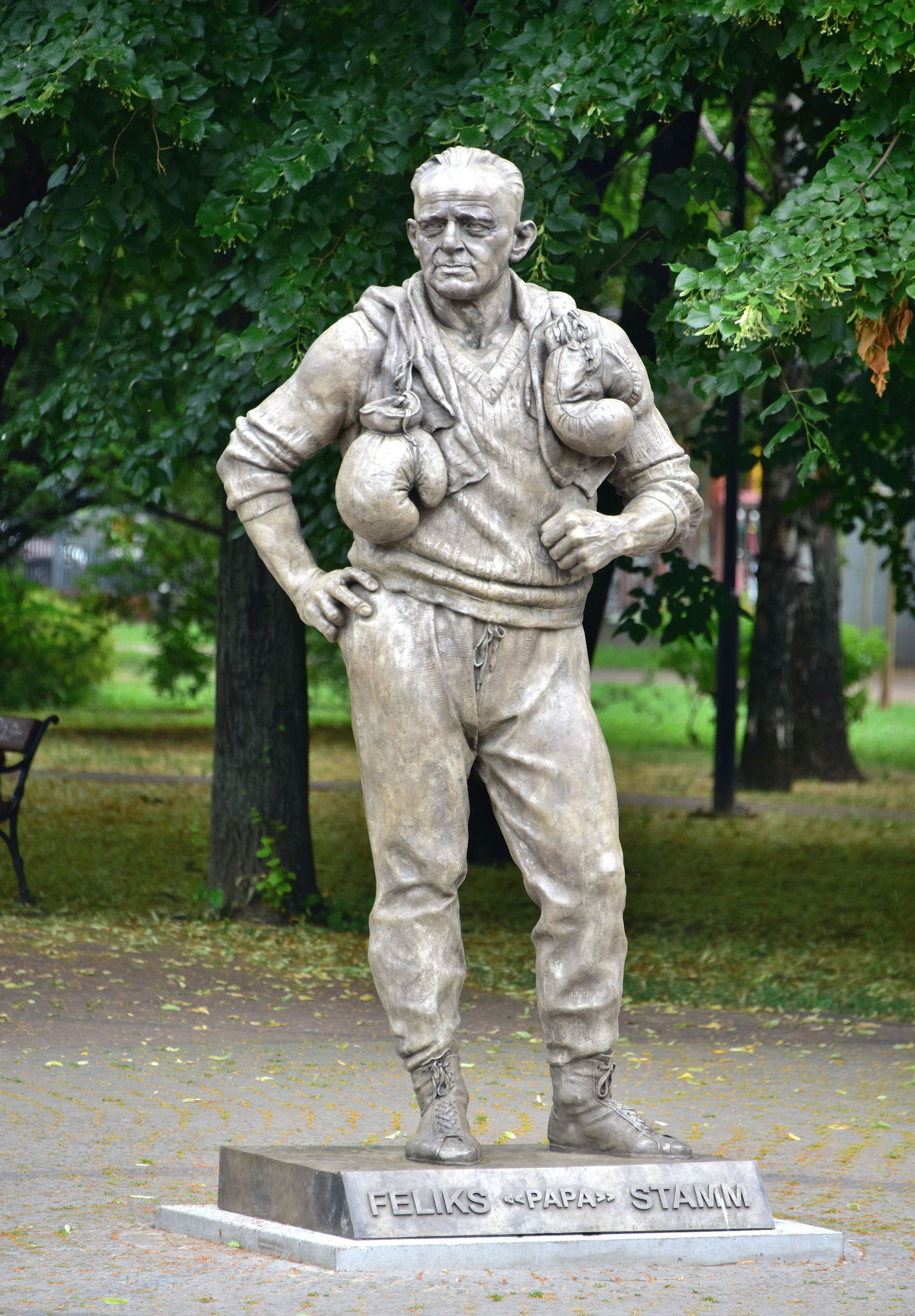
The Feliks Stamm Monument in 2019.

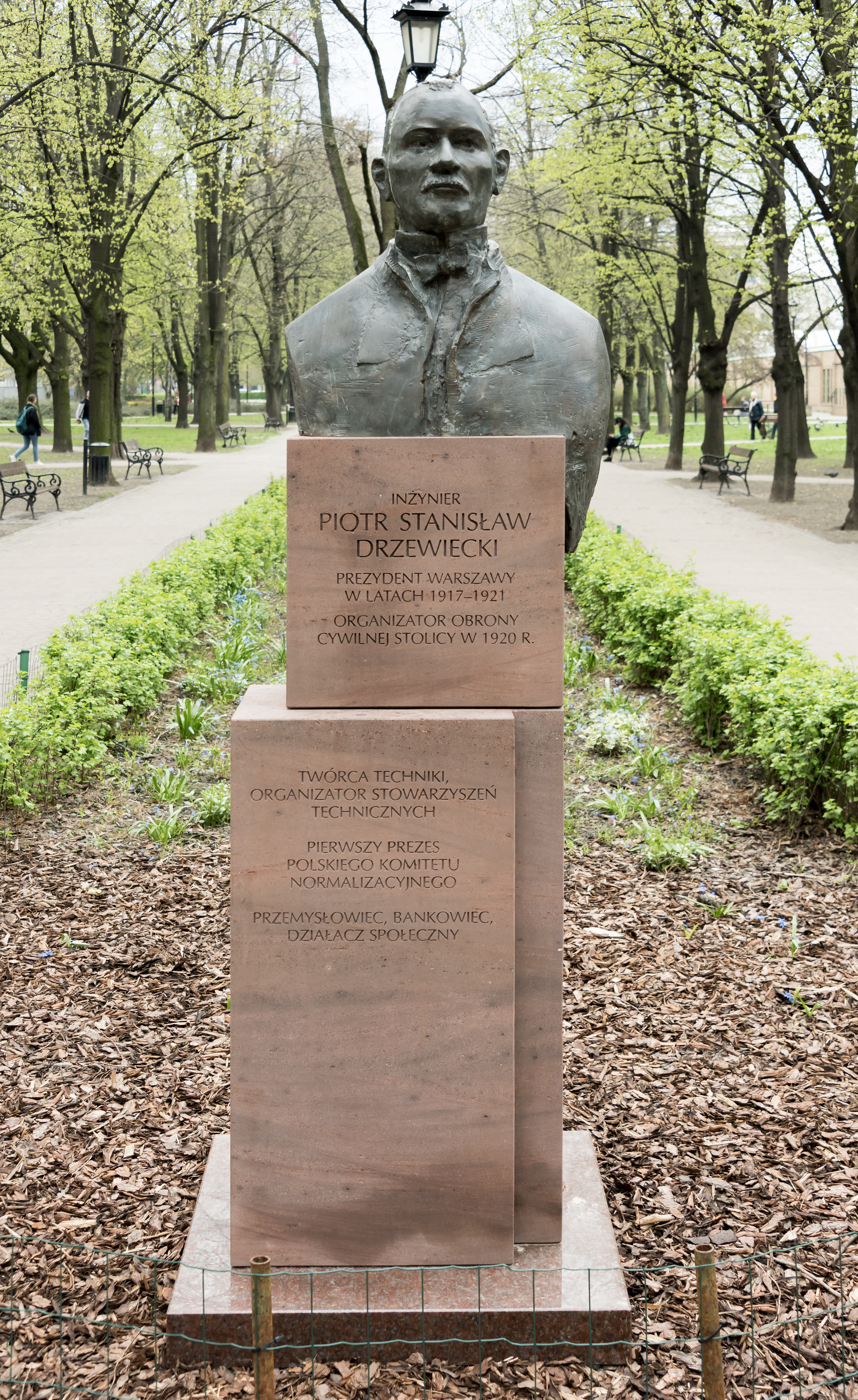
The Piotr Drzewiecki Monument in 2023.

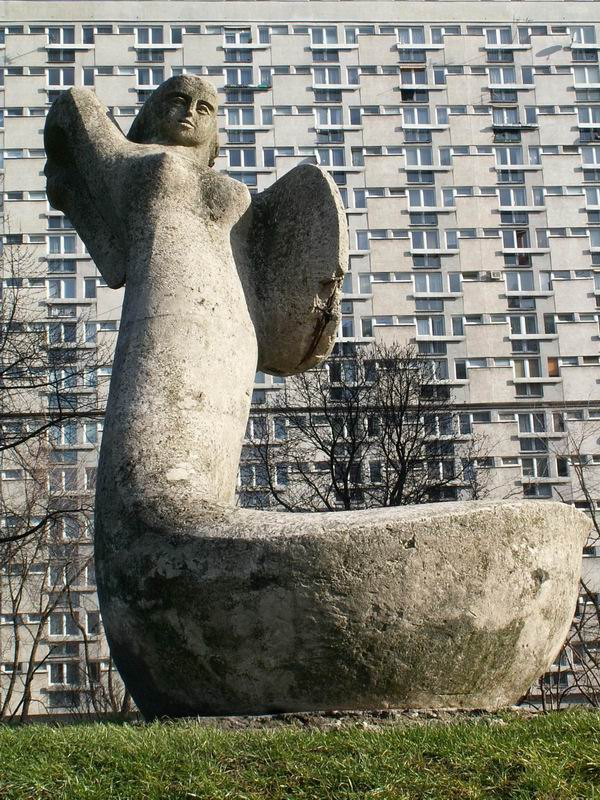
The sculpture of Mermaid of Warsaw by Ryszard Kozłowski in 2007.
