= Mier Barracks =

Historic building in Warsaw, Poland

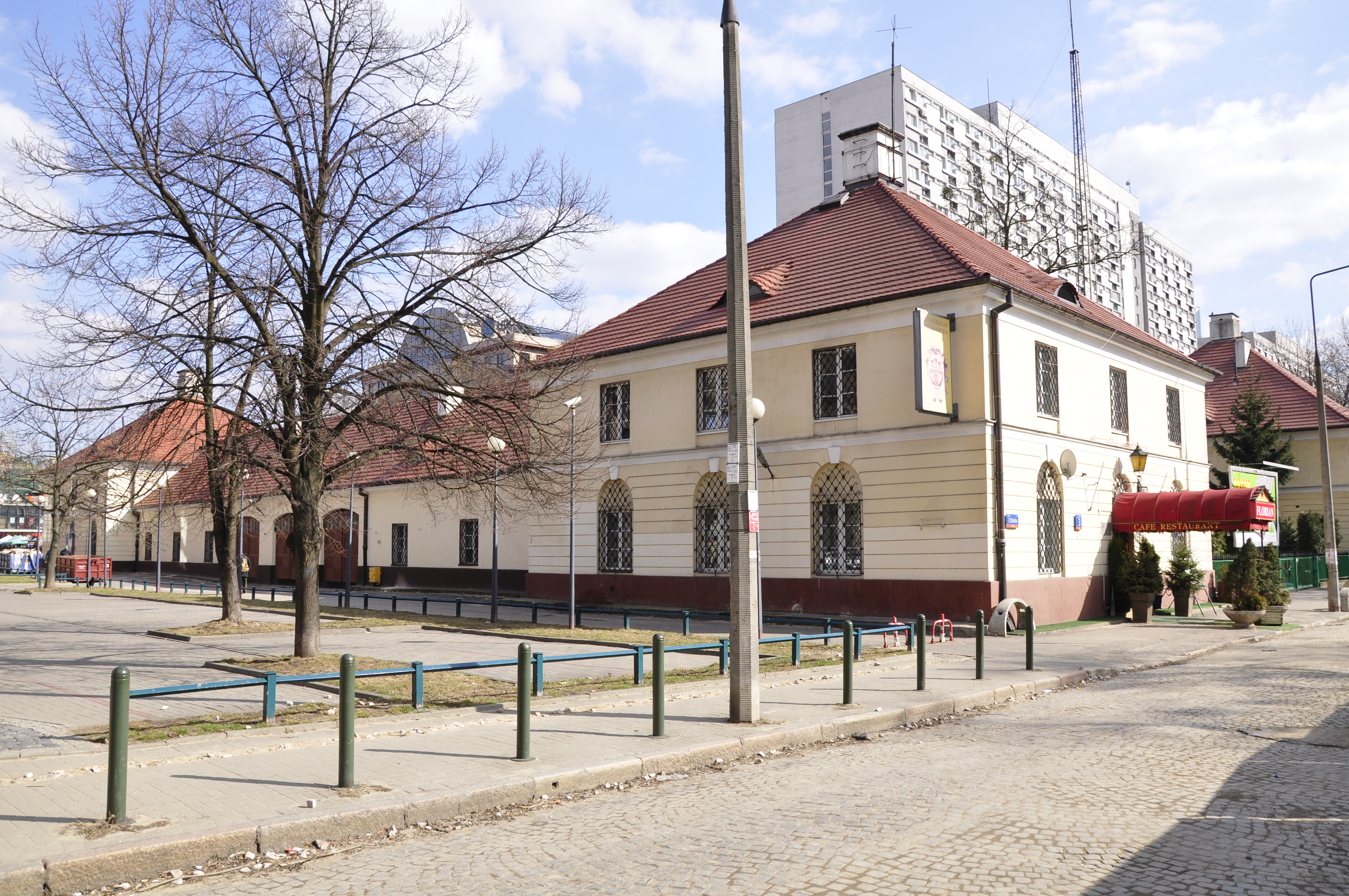
- The Mier Barracks in 2011.

General information
- Type: Barracks
- Architectural style: Neoclassical
- Location: Wola, Warsaw, Poland, 3 Chłodna Street
- Coordinates: 52°14′18″N 20°59′39″E
- Construction started: 1730
- Completed: 1732
- Owner: State Fire Service

Design and construction
- Architect: Joachim Daniel von Jauch

The Mier Barracks, (Note: Polish: Koszary Mirowskie) also known as the Crown Horse Guard Barracks, (Note: Polish: Koszary Gwardii Konnej Koronnej) and the Wielopole Barracks, (Note: Polish: Koszary Wielopolskie) is a historic complex of military barracks in Warsaw, Poland, located at 3 Chłodna Street, in the neighbourhood of Mirów within the district of Wola. Built in 1732, it originally consisted of six two-storey-tall buildings, placed in two rows on both sides of the street, with two buildings remaining to the present day. Upon opening, it housed the Crown Horse Guard Regiment, and was later used by the Army of Congress Poland until 1851, when it became a fire station of the Warsaw Fire Guard. Currently, it houses the Rescue and Firefighting Unit no. 4 of the State Fire Service.

== History ==
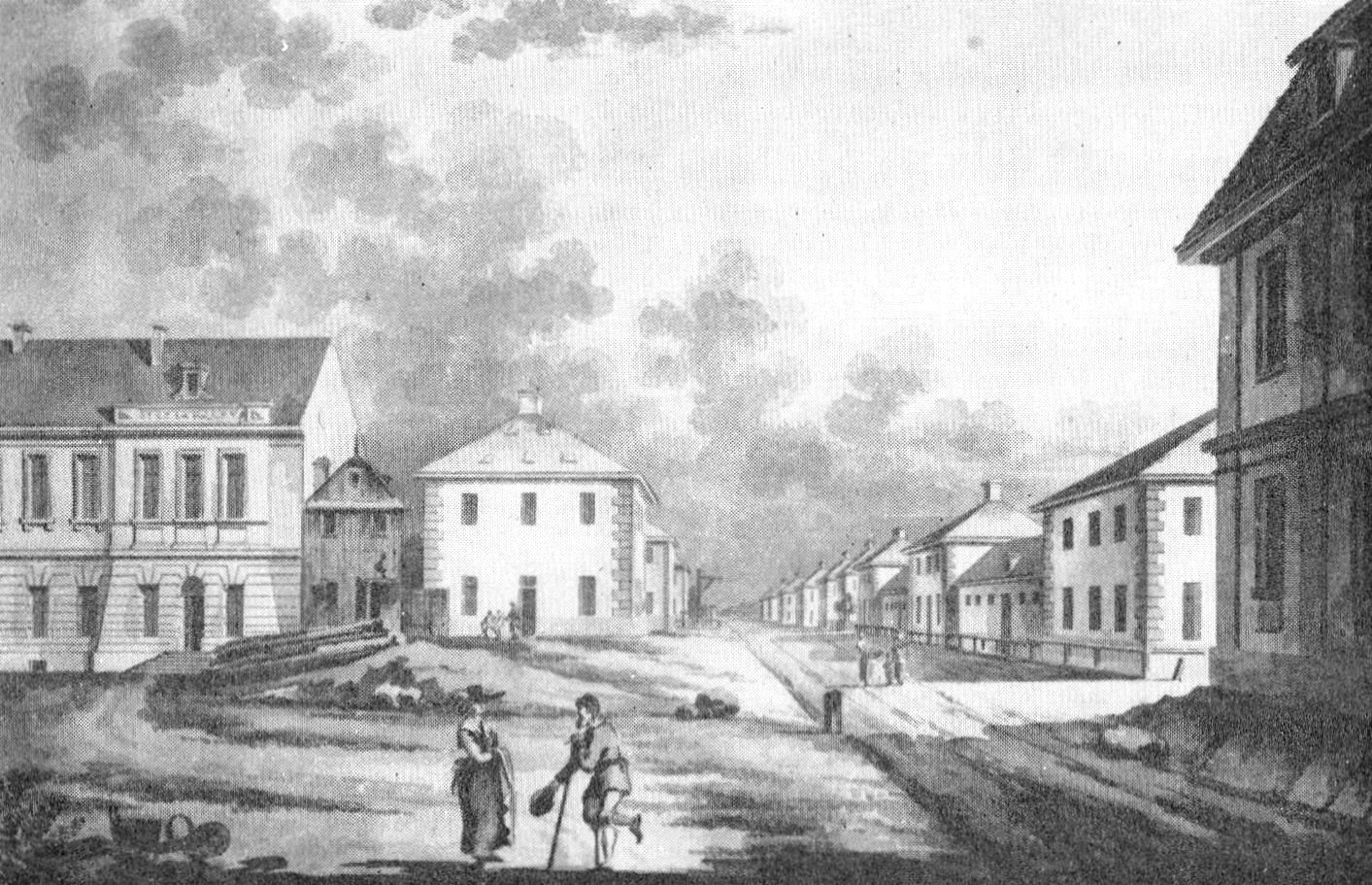
The Mier Barracks on a painting by Zygmunt Vogel, dating to around 1800.

The barracks were constructed in the town of Wielopole (now part of Warsaw) between 1730 and 1732, as part of the architecture of the Saxon Axis. They were designed by Joachim Daniel von Jauch. Until 1794, they housed the Crown Horse Guard Regiment, and became called after its commanding officer, Wilhelm Mier.

The complex consisted of two rows of three buildings, placed on both sides of Chłodna Street. Each was formed from three two-storey-tall buildings conjoined with corridors. The barracks were remodeled between 1784 and 1786, in neoclassical style, in accordance to project by Stanisław Zawadzki, and later again after 1815. Later, there were stationed the 2nd Uhlan Regiment from 1806 to 1807, the 14th Cuirassier Division in 1809, the 17th Uhlan Regiment from 1811 to 1812, and the 6th Uhlan Regiment from 1831.

In 1851, following the remodeling done by Józef Lessel, the western buildings begun housing the 4th Brigade of the Warsaw Fire Guard. There was also added an observation tower. Later, between the building were building tram tracks, running on Chłodna Street.

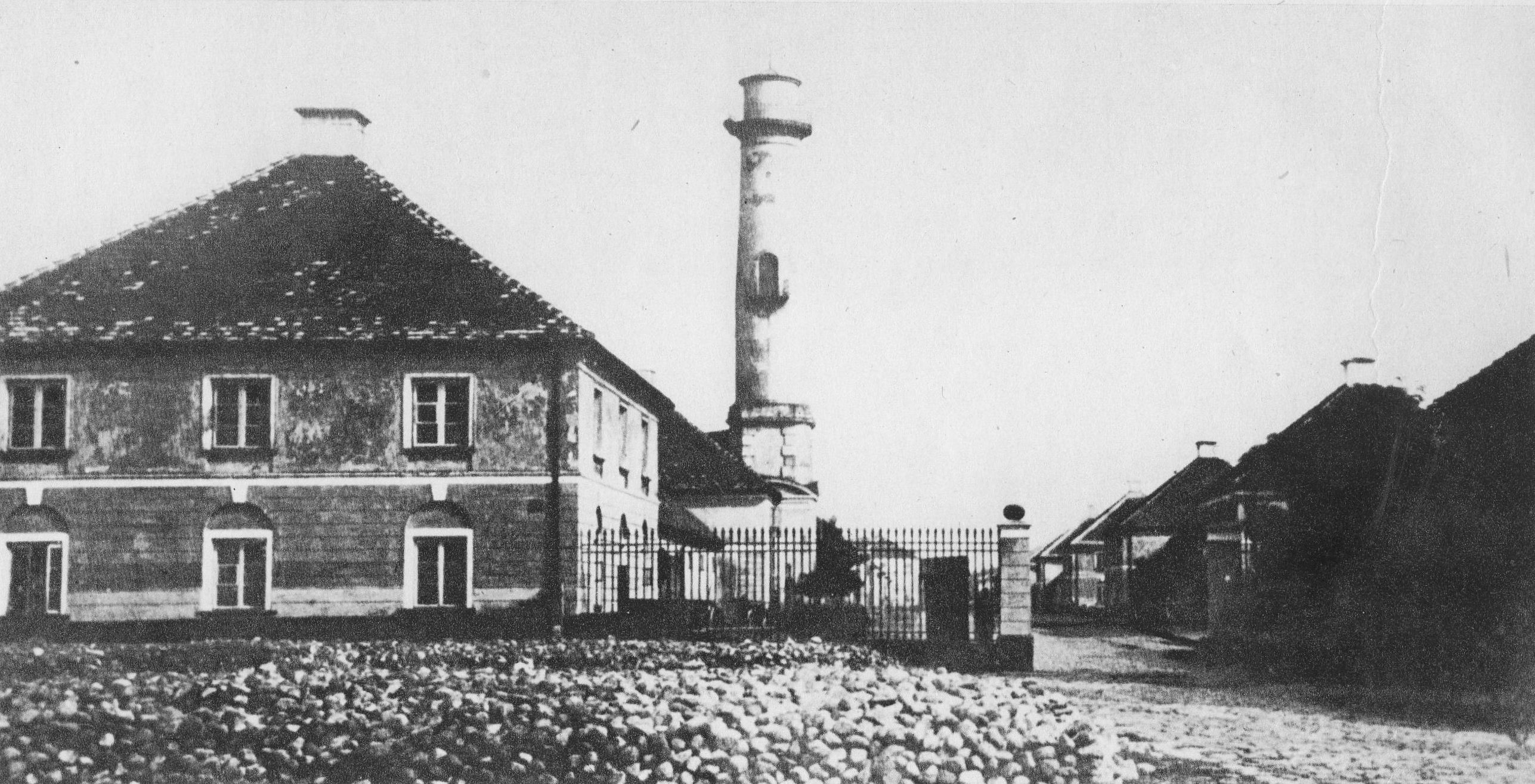
The Mier Barracks in 1865, as a fire station.

In 1898, four of its buildings were deconstructed, to make place for the Mier Halls, which construction begun in 1899, and lasted until 1902. They carried on the name of Wilhelm Mier, and eventually became the namesake of the nearby neighbourhood of Mirów.

In 1944, the remaining buildings of the Mier Barracks were burned town during, and in the aftermath of the Warsaw Uprising. After the end of the war, the south building was deconstructed, while the north building was rebuilt between 1948 and 1950, in accordance to the project by Władysław Netto. The observation tower was deconstructed. The south building was rebuilt in the 1970s, and both of them were connected via a glass corridor.

Currently the complex is used by the State Fire Service, which houses there the Rescue and Firefighting Unit no. 4. There are also headquarters of the Masovian Voivodeship Management of the Volunteer Fire Department Association, and the Association of Retired and Pensioner Firefighters of the Republic of Poland. From 1982, there was also located the Museum of Firefighting, until its collection was moved to the Warsaw Fire Department Education and History Centre, opened at 2 Marcinkowskiego Street in 2018.
