= Wilhelm Mier =

Polish military officer (c. 1680 – 1758)

Castellan of Słońsk
- In office 1746–1758

Governor of Kraków and Sandomierz
- In office 1 January 1715 – 31 December 1724

Alderman of Trzcinica
- In office 1721–1721

Alderman of Lubcza
- In office 1712–1712

Personal details
- Born: c. 1680
- Died: 13 February 1758
- Resting place: Church of the Visitation of the Blessed Virgin Mary, Wożuczyn, Poland
- Spouse: Katarzyna Barbara Geshaw
- Children: Józef Mier; Jan Mier; Marianna Karłowska

Military service
- Allegiance: Polish–Lithuanian Commonwealth
- Branch/service: Crown Army
- Years of service: Until 1740
- Rank: Major general
- Unit: Crown Horse Guard Regiment

Wilhelm Mier (c. 1680 – 13 February 1758) was a military officer, statesman, and nobleman. He was the Governor of Kraków and Sandomierz from 1715 to 1724, and the member of the Senate of the Polish–Lithuanian Commonwealth, as the Castellan of Słońsk, from 1746 to 1758. He was also a major general in the Crown Army of the Polish–Lithuanian Commonwealth, and the commanding officer of the Crown Horse Guard Regiment.

== Biography ==
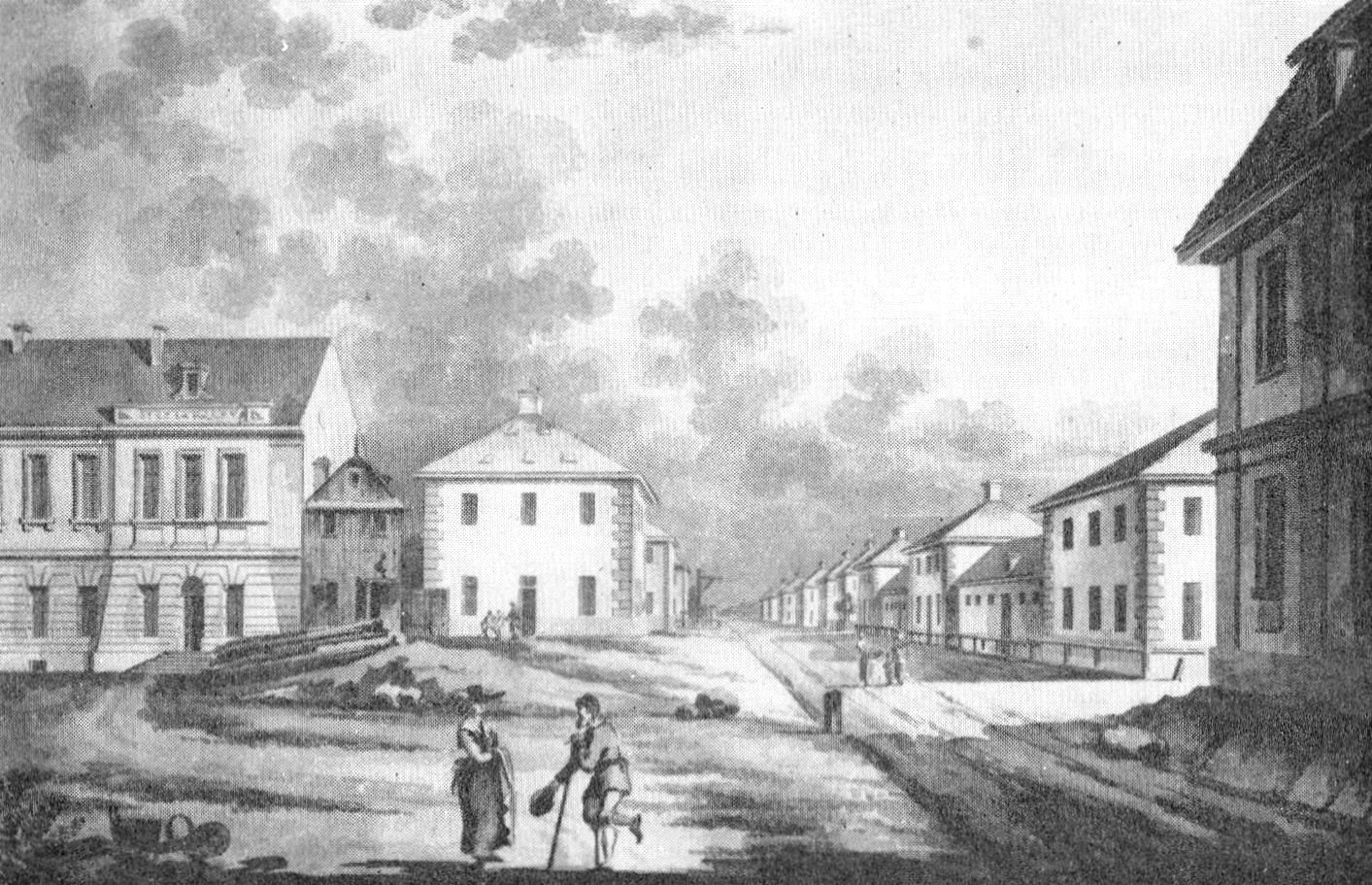
18th-century painting by Zygmunt Vogel depicting the Mier Barracks. The Crown Horse Guard Regiment, which was commanded by Wilhelm Mier, was stationed there.

Wilhelm Mier was born around 1680. He was the son of Jan Mier and Anna Ross. He was of Scottish descent, and related to the Clan Muir. His father was a major general in the Imperial Army of the Holy Roman Empire, and a commander of the Petrovaradin Fortress.

He served in the Crown Army of the Polish–Lithuanian Commonwealth, with the rank of colonel from 1706 to 1720, and major general from 1721 to 1738. In 1717, he organized Crown Horse Guard Regiment, and was its commanding officer until 1740. The unit was informally called Mier Guard after him. The barracks of the unit, built between 1730 and 1732 in the town of Wielopole (now part of Warsaw) also became known as Mier Barracks.

Wilhelm Mier was the alderman (starosta) of Lubcza in 1712, and Trzcinica in 1721. From 1 January 1715 to 31 December 1724, he was the Governor of Kraków and Sandomierz, administrating the crown land. In 1726, for his service to the country, the Seym of the Polish–Lithuanian Commonwealth granted him the indygenat, which was the recognition of his noble status. From 1746 to 1758, he was the castellan of Słońsk, which made him a member of the Senate of Poland.

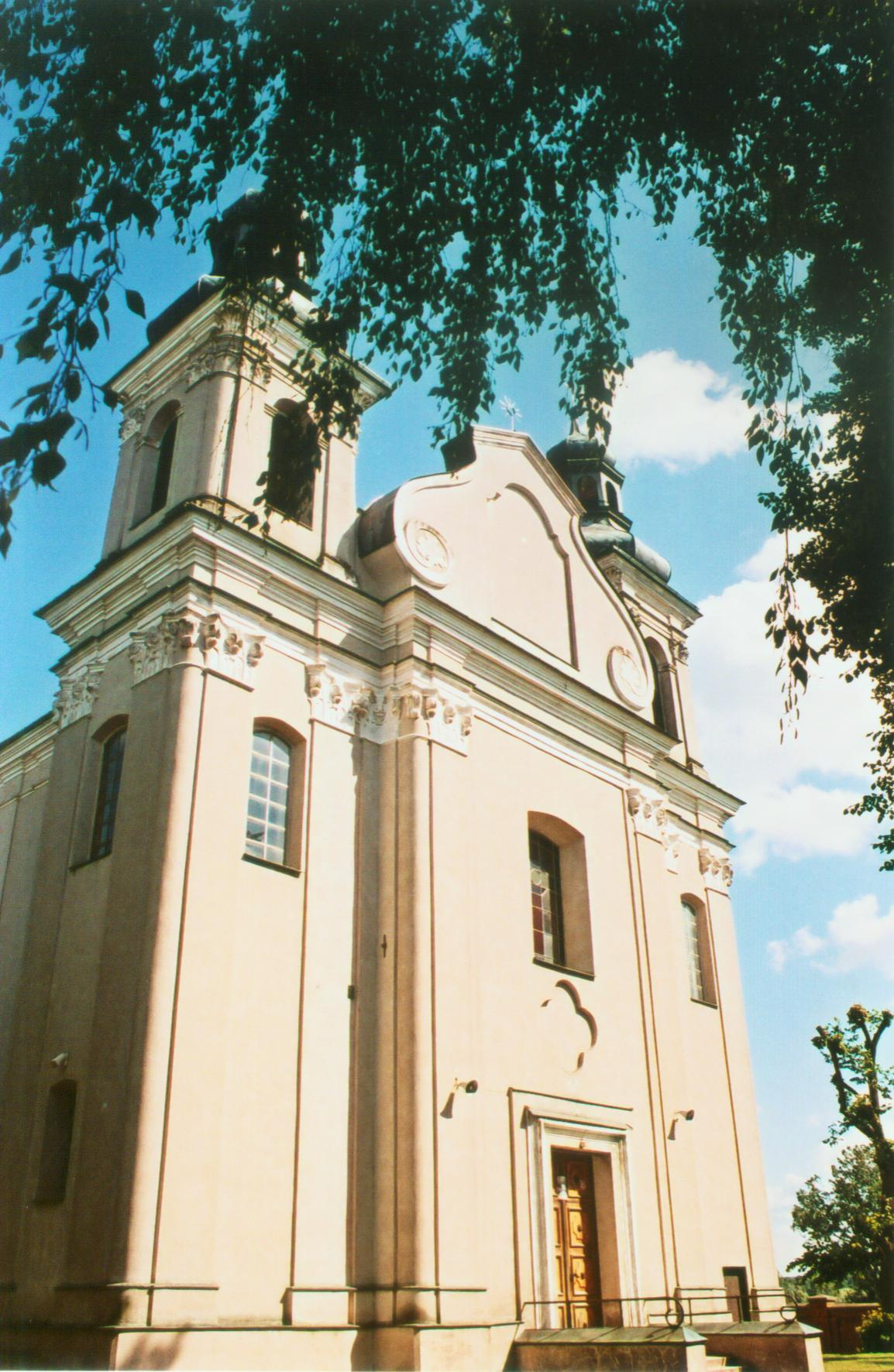
The Church of the Visitation of the Blessed Virgin Mary in Wożuczyn, Poland, whose construction was founded by Mier, and in which he was buried.

In 1730s, he bought the village of Wożuczyn. There, he developed the local castle, and founded the construction of the Church of the Visitation of the Blessed Virgin Mary between 1742 and 1750.

According to most sources, Wilhelm Mier died on 13 February 1758. He was buried in the Church of the Visitation of the Blessed Virgin Mary in Wożuczyn.

== Personal life ==
Wilhelm Mier was married to Katarzyna Barbara Geshaw, with whom he had three children; two sons and one daughter. They were: Jan Mier, Józef Mier, and Marianna Karłowska.

== Commemoration and legacy ==
The Crown Horse Guard Regiment, of which Wilhelm Mier was the commanding officer, was informally called the Mier Guard. The barracks in Wielopole (now part of Warsaw), in which the unit was stationed, because known as the Mier Barracks. The nearby town square also became known as the Mier Square. In 1903, particially in place of the barracks were opened two market hall, which were named the Mier Halls. Formerly in the area was also Mirowska Street (Polish: ulica Mirowska; lit. Mier Street), named after the barracks, and located between Jana Pawła II and Zimna Street. In the 1960s, in the area was also built the urban park named after the barracks, the Mier Park.

The neighbourhood in Warsaw, Poland, in which the Mier Barracks and the Mier Halls were located, was named Mirów after them and Wilhelm Mier.
