= Piotr Drzewiecki Memorial =

Monument in Warsaw, Poland

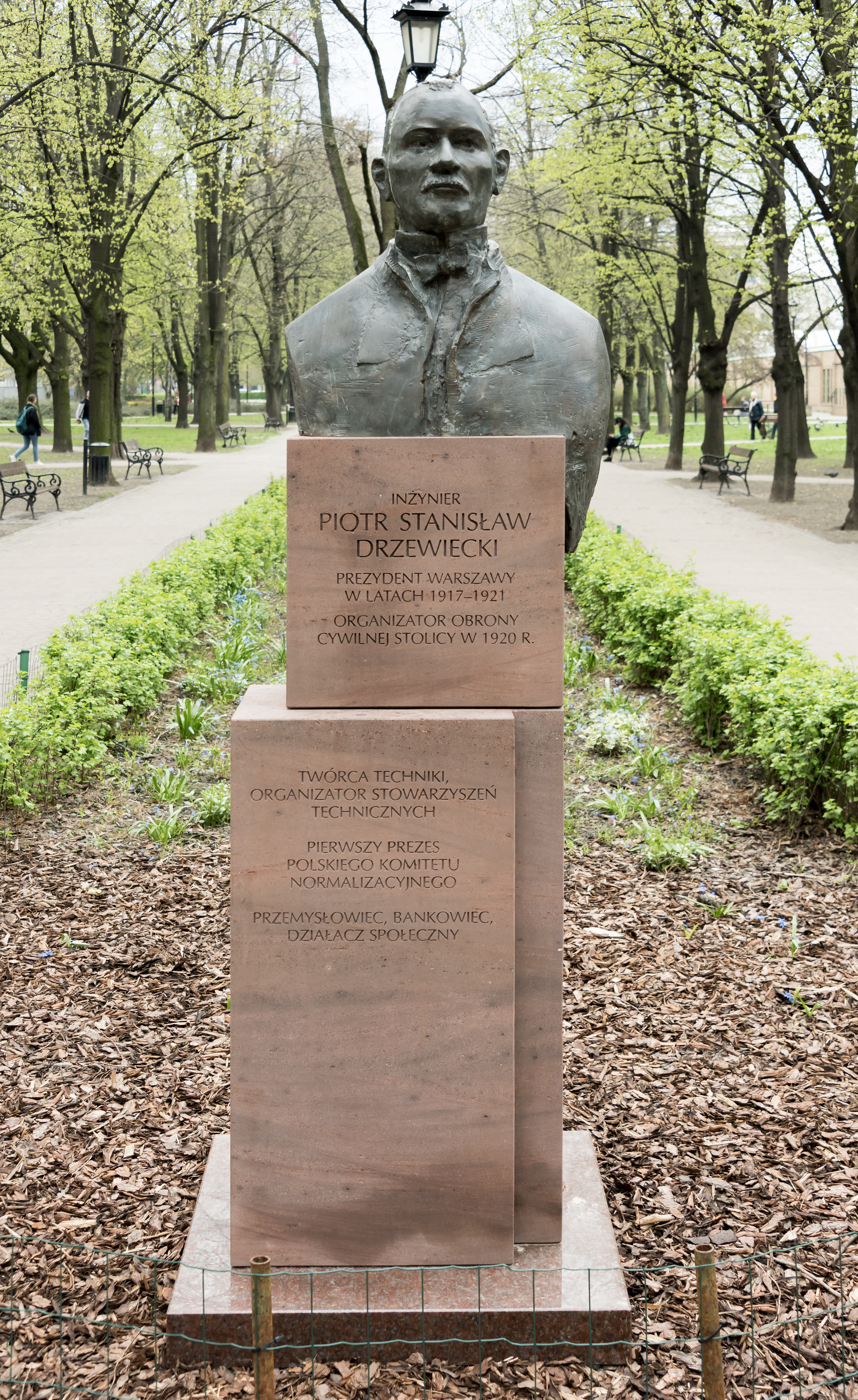
- The monument in 2023.
- Interactive map of Piotr Drzewiecki Memorial
- Location: Mier Park, Downtown, Warsaw, Poland
- Coordinates: 52.238538°N 21.000507°E
- Type: Bust
- Opening date: 2 March 2023
- Dedicated to: Piotr Drzewicki

The Piotr Drzewiecki Memorial (Polish: [ˈpjɔtr dʐɛˈvjɛt͡s.ki]; Polish: Pomnik Piotra Drzewieckiego) is a monument in Warsaw, Poland, placed in the Mier Park, within the Downtown district. It consists of a bust of Piotr Drzewicki, a 19th- and 20th-century engineer and politician, who was the mayor of Warsaw from 1917 to 1921. The monument was unveiled on 2 March 2023.

== History ==
The bust of the monument was financed by the Polish Federation of Engineering Associations, while the pedestal, by the Public Areas Management of Warsaw, with the total cost of 50,000 złoties. It was unveiled on 2 March 2023.

== Characteristics ==
The monument is placed in the Mier Park, at Piotr Drzewiecki Avenue (Polish: Aleja Piotra Drzewieckiego). It consists of a bust of Piotr Drzewicki, a 19th- and 20th-century engineer and politician, who was the mayor of Warsaw from 1917 to 1921. It is placed on a pedestal that consists of two parts, an upper, formed from a cube, and a lower, formed from a larger vertical cuboid. It features the following inspiration:

Polish inscription	English translation
Inżynier; Piotr Stanisław Drzewiecki; Prezydent Warszawy w latach 1917–1921; Organizator obrony cywilnej stolicy w 1920 r.	Engineer; Piotr Stanisław Drzewiecki; Mayor of Warsaw from 1917 to 1921; Organizator of the capital civil defence of 1920
Twórca techniki, organizator sowarzyszeń technicznych	Creator of the technical institute, organizator of the technology associations
Pierwszy Prezes Polskiego Komitetu Normalizacyjnego	First chairperson of the Polish Committee for Standardization
Przemysłowiec, bankowiec, działacz społeczny	Industrialist, banker, social activist
