= Warsaw Fire Guard =

Fire fighting unit in Warsaw, Poland

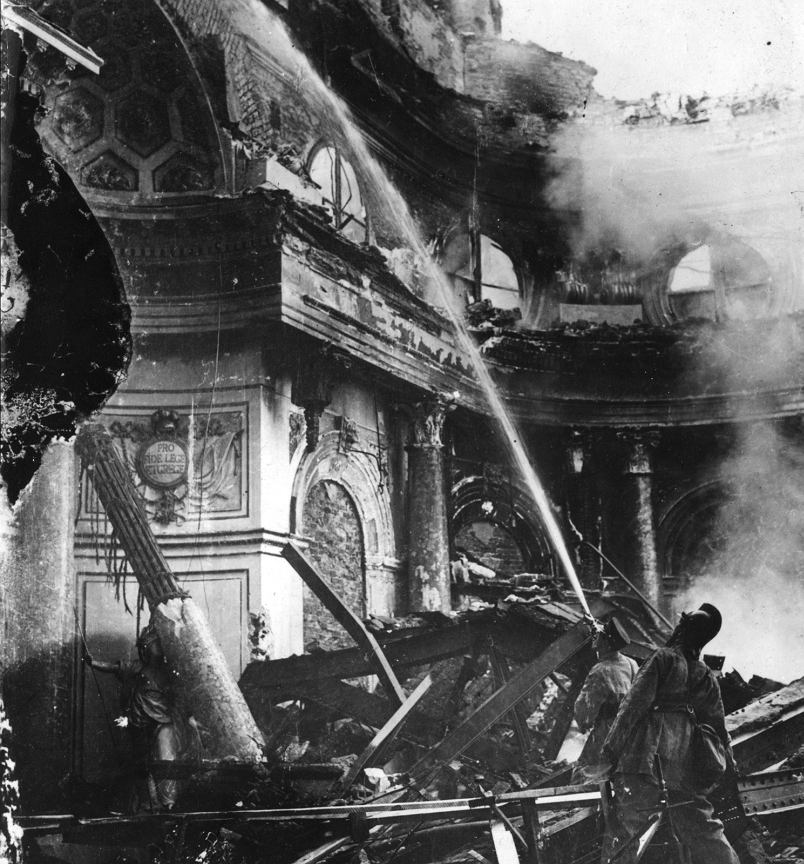
A firefighter in the ballroom of the Royal Castle in Warsaw following a German air raid in 1939

Warsaw Fire Guard (Polish: Warszawska Straż Ogniowa) was a fire fighting unit in the city of Warsaw. Formed as Warsaw's first permanent fire service in 1834, it remained an independent and city-owned venture until its nationalization by the Nazi German authorities during the occupation of Poland following the Invasion of Poland of 1939.

== History ==
The Warsaw Fire Brigade was created on December 23, 1834, by the Administrative Council of the Kingdom of Poland. It was to be modeled after a similar fire-fighting unit created in Saint Petersburg only a year earlier. On February 6 of the following year Lt. Colonel Jan Robosz became the first Fire Chief of Fire Guard in Warsaw. The organization of the unit ended on January 1, 1836, and it began its duty. Initially named Fire Guard in Warsaw (Straż Ogniowa w Warszawie), in 1841 it was renamed to Warsaw Fire Guard (Warszawska Straż Ogniowa). The Guard was entitled with all maintenance duties in the city, including putting down fires and fire prevention, but also cleaning the chimneys and the streets. It was divided onto four departments, each of them responsible for a different borough of Warsaw. In 1851 an additional department was created for the borough of Mirów. In 1864 the Guards received the first steam engine-operated mobile pump, manufactured by a London-based F. Shand, Mason and Co. firm. The following year two additional vehicles arrived, thus making the Warsaw Fire Guard one of the best-equipped fire units in continental Europe. The Guards also assisted in a number of experiments, among them in the tests of a carbonic acid fire extinguisher in 1869.

Firemen's pump used by the Home Army soldiers as an improvised flamethrower during the siege of PAST building, in the early stages of the Warsaw Uprising. As the car was damaged, the fuel was pumped directly from its container.

Although the Guards remained largely independent even after the failed January Uprising against Russia, the death of Col. Urban Majewski in 1872 marked the end of much of its independence. His successor as the commander of the Guards, Col. Ivan Anienkov, was a Russian and, in accordance with Russian policy of Russification of Poland, until World War I all commanders of the Guards were also Russians. In 1887 the Guards form a Fire Brigade Band; with time it became one of the notable parts of the folklore of the firefighting units in Poland. Even as of 2006 most of the fire fighting units have their own orchestras. In 1878, president of Warsaw Sokrat Starynkiewicz ordered a new building for the Guards' headquarters, the first such building constructed in Poland specifically for the needs of the firefighters. Throughout its existence, the Guard usually followed the technical development and introduction of new equipment. In 1906 the guards were equipped with asbestos protective gear, as the first firefighting unit in the Russian Empire. In 1911 the first mobile ladder made by the Magirus company arrived, and in 1914 the Guards leased the first automobile, a van manufactured in the Büssing company.

After the outbreak of World War I, the Guards continued their service. However, in July 1915 the Russians ordered the evacuation of Warsaw and most of the Guards, along with their equipment. Some of them served in Russian cities, most notably Minsk, Moscow and St. Petersburg. However, many of them escaped from the Russians and return to the Central Powers-occupied city. Among them is Józef Tuliszkowski, who on September 4 was named the commander of the guards. In 1916 the first automobile built exclusively for the firefighters was purchased from the Hans Lloyd company. The same year the citizens of Warsaw sponsored a banner for the Guards, to mark the 80th anniversary of their creation.

After the end of World War I, Poland regained her independence and the pre-war commander of I and IV departments, Capt. Józef Hłasko, returned to Warsaw from Moscow (where he served as the commander of that city's firefighters) and became the successor of Tuliszkowski. In 1920, during the Polish-Bolshevik War, the Polish Ministry of Interior decided to nationalize the unit. However, the authorities of Warsaw have sued the state authorities and the decision was withdrawn. Until World War II the Warsaw Fire Guards were the only privately owned fire brigade in Poland and one of the very few such units in the world. Officially their status was similar to that of the Municipal Police. The private ownership (most of the shares were held by the city of Warsaw) allowed for fast modernization of the Guards. In 1928 the last horse-drawn cart was decommissioned; since then the Guard has been fully motorized. In 1936 a new headquarters was built at Polna street, where one of the branches is located even now.

In 1939, after the outbreak of the Invasion of Poland, by orders of one of the military commanders, the Warsaw Fire Guard was withdrawn from Warsaw to Lublin. However, many firefighters ignored the orders and stayed in Warsaw, where their continued their service during the hard days of the siege of Warsaw, extinguishing fires in dramatic conditions, often during German bombardment. Along with their colleagues evacuated from Łódź, Brzeziny, Ozorków and Nieszawa, they continued their service until the capitulation of Warsaw. Altogether, the Warsaw firefighters lost 30 men and 50 wounded during the fights.

After the start of the German occupation of Poland, the Warsaw Fire Guard was officially nationalized by the Nazis. However, the unit remained largely independent and in December 1939 most of the firefighters joined a newly formed Skała resistance organization, with time incorporated into the Armia Krajowa. Most of the firefighters took part in the Warsaw Uprising of 1944, where their experience and commitment proved vital in stiffening the resistance of the besieged city under constant bombardment. On an interesting note, one of the self-propelled pumps of the Warsaw Fire Guard was used as a flamethrower during the heavy fights for the PAST building. The last commander of the Warsaw Fire Guards was Col. Adam Kalinowski. After the war the Allied-backed communist authorities of Poland did not re-create the Guards and instead formed a local branch of the state-owned firefighters unit.

== Stamp ==
A 10-zloty postage stamp was issued in 1986 to commemorate the Brigade's 150th anniversary. It featured a painting by Józef Brodowski of the brigade's horse-drawn carriages on their way to a fire in 1870.

== See also ==
- State Fire Service of the Polish Interior Ministry.
