= Ignacio Mier =

Mexican politician from Puebla (born 1961)

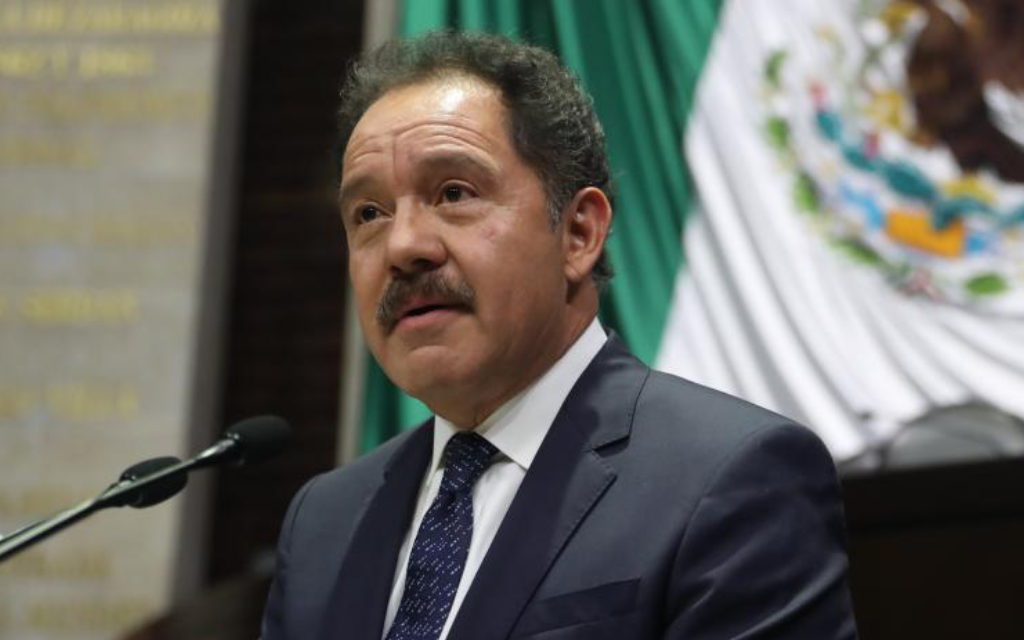
- Mier Velazco in 2019

Senator for Puebla
- Incumbent
- Assumed office 2024

Personal details
- Born: Moisés Ignacio Mier Velazco; 4 January 1961 (age 65) Tecamachalco, Puebla, Mexico
- Party: Morena
- Other political affiliations: PRI

Moisés Ignacio Mier Velazco (Note: In this name that follows Hispanic American naming customs, the first or paternal surname is Mier and the second or maternal family name is Velazco.) (born 4 January 1961) is a Mexican politician who has been affiliated with both the Institutional Revolutionary Party (PRI) and the National Regeneration Movement (Morena). He currently serves as a Senator of the Republic for Puebla and is a member of the Senate's Political Coordination Board (JUCOPA).

== Political career ==
Ignacio Mier Velazco was born on 4 January 1961 in Tecamachalco, Puebla. He says he holds a bacherlor's degree in business administration.

In the 1997 mid-terms he was elected to the Chamber of Deputies to represent Puebla's 8th district for the Institutional Revolutionary Party (PRI). In the 2018 general election he was elected to the Chamber of Deputies as a plurinominal deputy for the fourth region, representing the National Regeneration Movement (Morena). During his term, he led the Morena bloc in the Chamber of Deputies.

Mier Velazco won election as one of Puebla's senators in the 2024 Senate election, occupying the first place on the Sigamos Haciendo Historia coalition's two-name formula. In the Senate, he is a member of the Foreign Relations and Constitutional Points Committees. In February 2026, he replaced Adán Augusto López as Morena's parliamentary coordinator in the upper house.
