= Statue of Feliks Stamm =

Monument in Warsaw, Poland

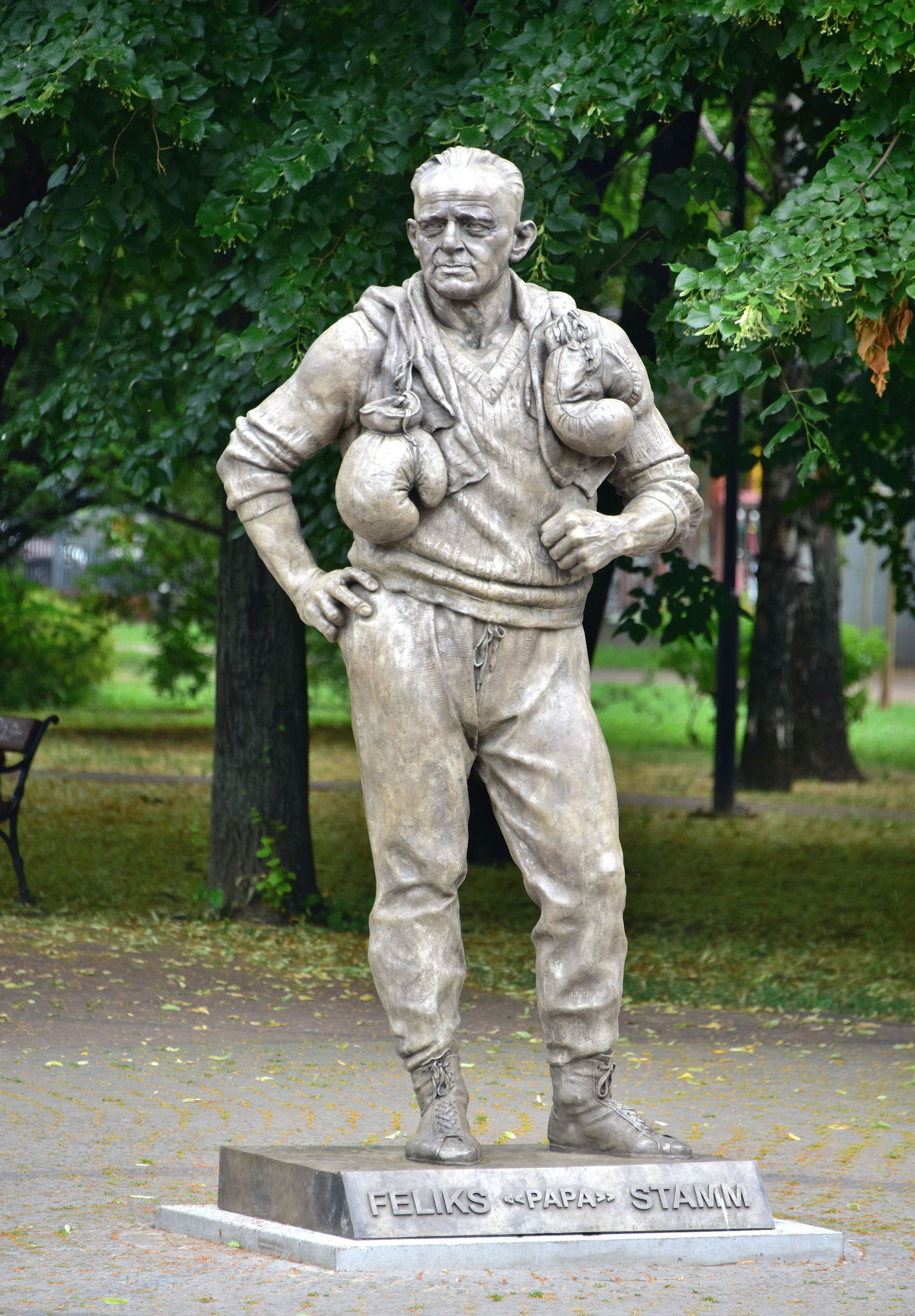
- The monument in 2019.
- Interactive map of Statue of Feliks Stamm
- Location: Mier Park, Downtown, Warsaw, Poland
- Coordinates: 52°14′17.0″N 20°59′50.9″E
- Designer: Lubomir Grigorov
- Type: Statue
- Material: Bronze
- Height: 2.6 m (total); 2.4 m (statue)
- Completion date: 21 May 2019
- Opening date: 25 October 2019
- Dedicated to: Feliks Stamm

The statue of Feliks Stamm (Polish: Pomnik Feliksa Stamma) is a bronze statue in Warsaw, Poland, placed in the Mier Park, near John Paul II Avenue, in the North Downtown neighbourhood. It is dedicated to Feliks Stamm, a 20th-century boxer and coach. The monument was designed by Lubomir Grigorov, and unveiled on 21 May 2019.

== History ==
The monument was proposed by the Feliks Stamm Foundation, chaired by the athlete's granddaughter Paula Stamm. It was financed by businessperson Zbigniew Jakubas. On 5 April 2015, the Warsaw City Council had approved its construction.

The bronze sculpture was designed by Lubomir Grigorov, and unveiled on 21 May 2019, to commemorate a Polish team of five boxers, trained by Stamm, winning gold medals at the 1953 European Amateur Boxing Championships, which were held in the nearby East Hall of the Mier Halls. Today, the building also houses a museum dedicated to Stamm. The monument was unveiled by Paula Stamm and actor Daniel Olbrychski. The ceremony was attended by Rafał Trzaskowski, the mayor of Warsaw, Jan Widera, the deputy minister of sport, and Andrzej Kraśnicki, the chairperson of the Polish Olympic Committee.

== Design ==
The monument consist of a bronze statue of Feliks Stamm, wearing a sports tracksuit, with a towel and boxing gloves hanged around his neck. It is 240-centimetres-tall, and stands on a 20-centimetre-tall pedestal, with inscription which reads: "Feliks 'Papa' Stamm".
