= Stradom =

Stradom may refer to:

- Stradom, Kraków
- Stradom, Częstochowa
