= Kolmex =

Office building in Warsaw, Poland

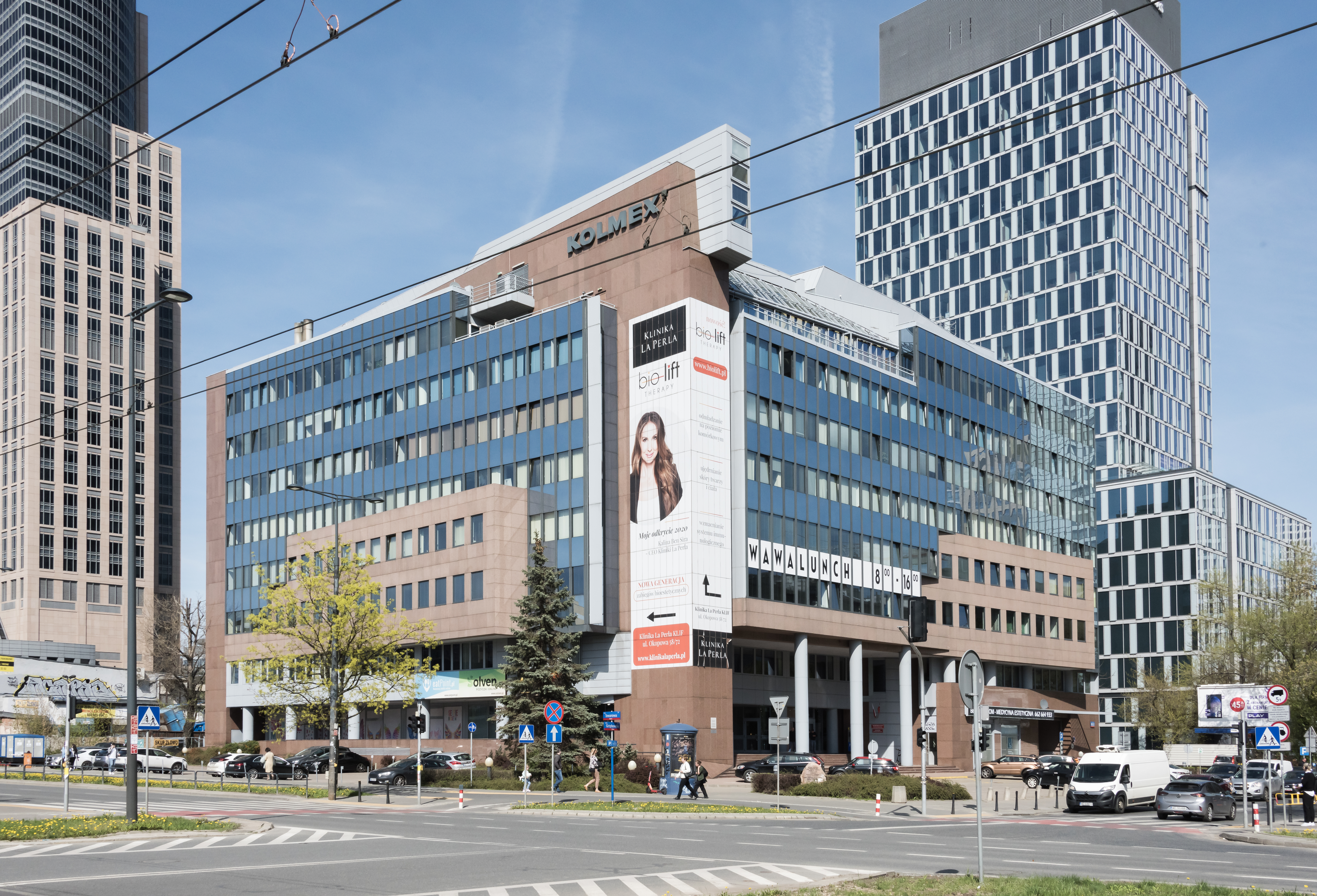
- Kolmex in 2023.
- Interactive map of the Kolmex area

General information
- Type: Office building
- Architectural style: Deconstructivism
- Location: Wola, Warsaw, Poland
- Coordinates: 52°14′01.86″N 20°58′58.41″E
- Construction started: 1990
- Completed: 1992
- Owner: Kolmex

Technical details
- Floor count: 8
- Floor area: 18,044 m²

Design and construction
- Architect: Tadeusz Spychała
- Developer: Kolmex

Kolmex is a postmodern office building in Warsaw, Poland, located at 80 and 92 Grzybowa Street, in the neighbourhood of Mirów within the district of Wola. It was opened in 1992. It is owned by the rail transport company Kolmex.

== History ==
The building was constructed between 1990 and 1992 as the headquarters of rail transport company Kolmex. It was designed by architect Tadeusz Spychała, in cooperation with Janina Chrzanowska-Neykoff, Andrzej Kapuścik, Grzegorz Kepler, Herman Kittel, and Herbert Swoboda. Its style was based on deconstructivism inspired on works by Frank Gehry. It was nominated in the contest Życie w Architekturze for the best building of Warsaw constructed between 1989 and 1995.

== Characteristics ==
The building is placed on an intersection of Grzybowa and Towarowa Streets. It has 8 storeys and a total floor area of 18,044 m², of which, 14,435 m² is designated to office spaces, and 500 m² to stores and services.
