= JM Tower =

Skyscraper in Warsaw, Poland

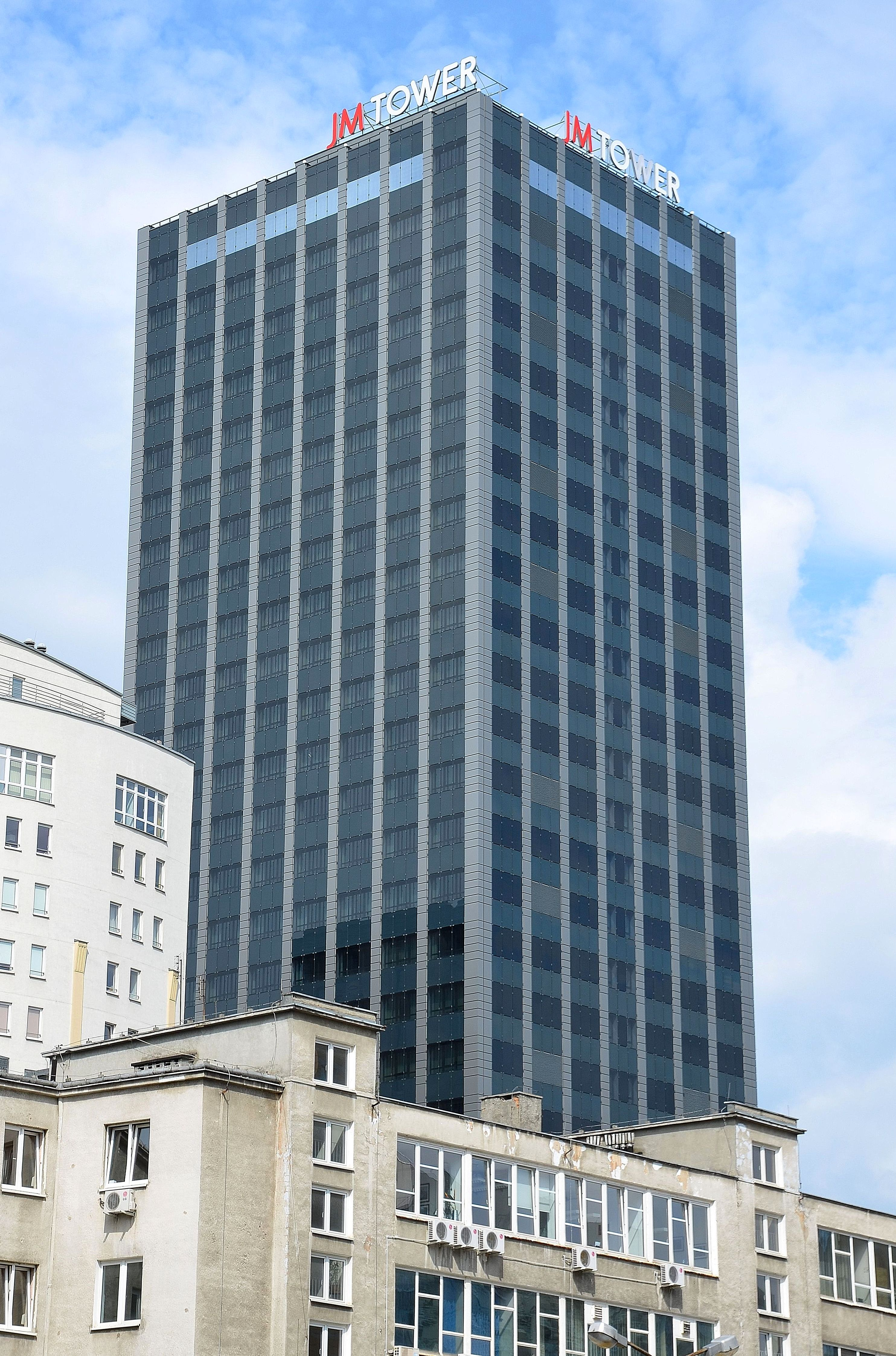
- JM Tower in 2013.
- Interactive map of the JM Tower area

General information
- Type: Office building
- Location: Warsaw, Poland, 45 Grzybowska Street
- Coordinates: 52°14′03″N 20°59′23″E
- Construction started: 2007
- Completed: 2011

Height
- Tip: 92 m
- Roof: 92 m

Technical details
- Floor count: 29
- Floor area: 26,901 m²

Design and construction
- Developer: J.M. Property

JM Tower is an office skyscraper in Warsaw, Poland, located at 45 Grzybowska Street, in the district of Wola. It was opened in 2011, and has the total height of 92 m

== History ==
JM Tower was constructed between 2007 and 2011, as an investment of J.M. Property.

== Characteristics ==
JM Tower is located at 45 Grzybowska Street, in the neighbourhood of Mirów, within the district of Wola. It is primarily an office building, with some spaces additionally allocated to a hotel. It has 29 storeys, its total height is 92 m, and its total area is 26,901 m^{2}.
