= Stradom, Częstochowa =

District of Częstochowa, Poland

Stradom
- District of Częstochowa
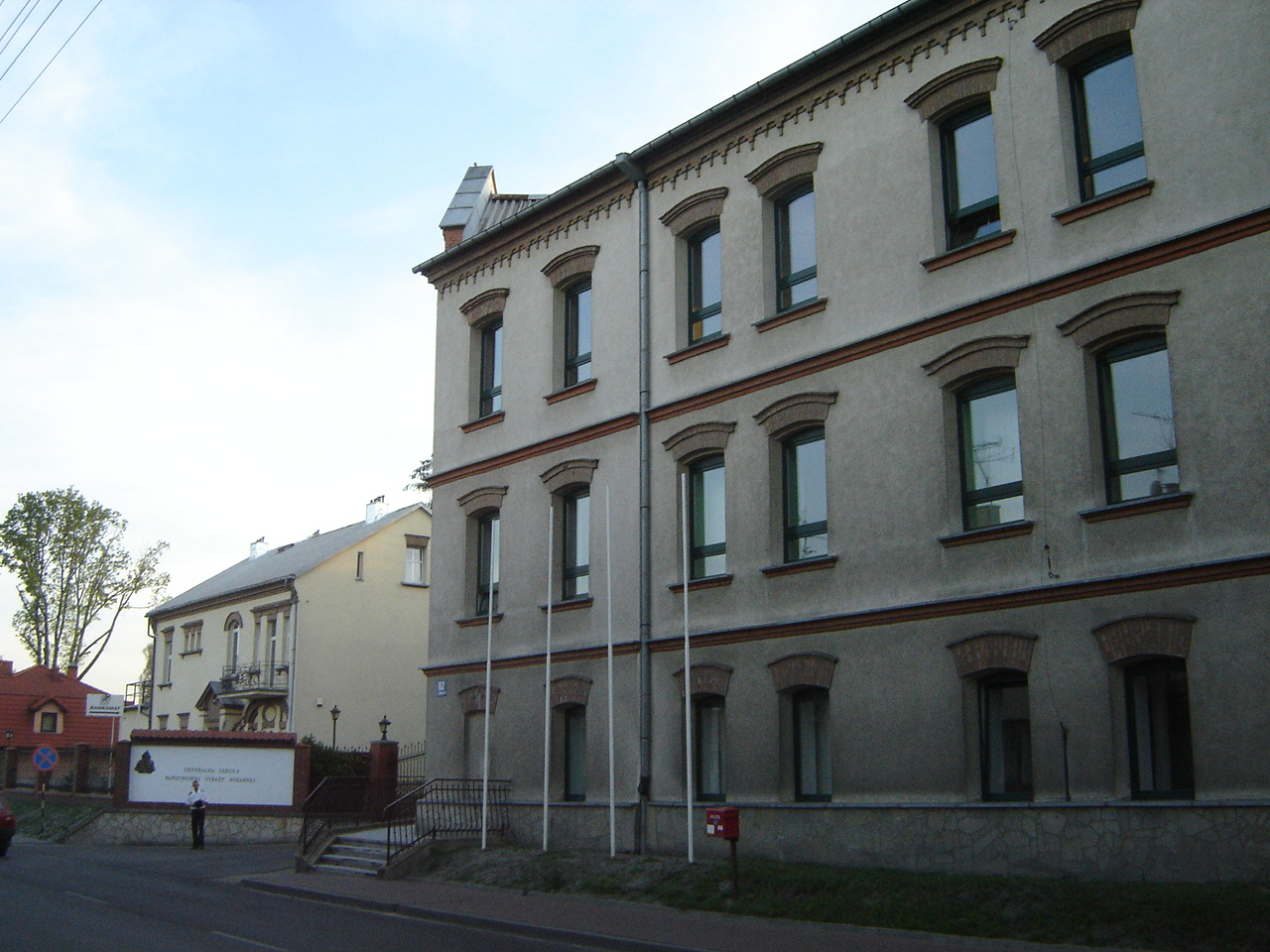
- Central School of the State Fire Service

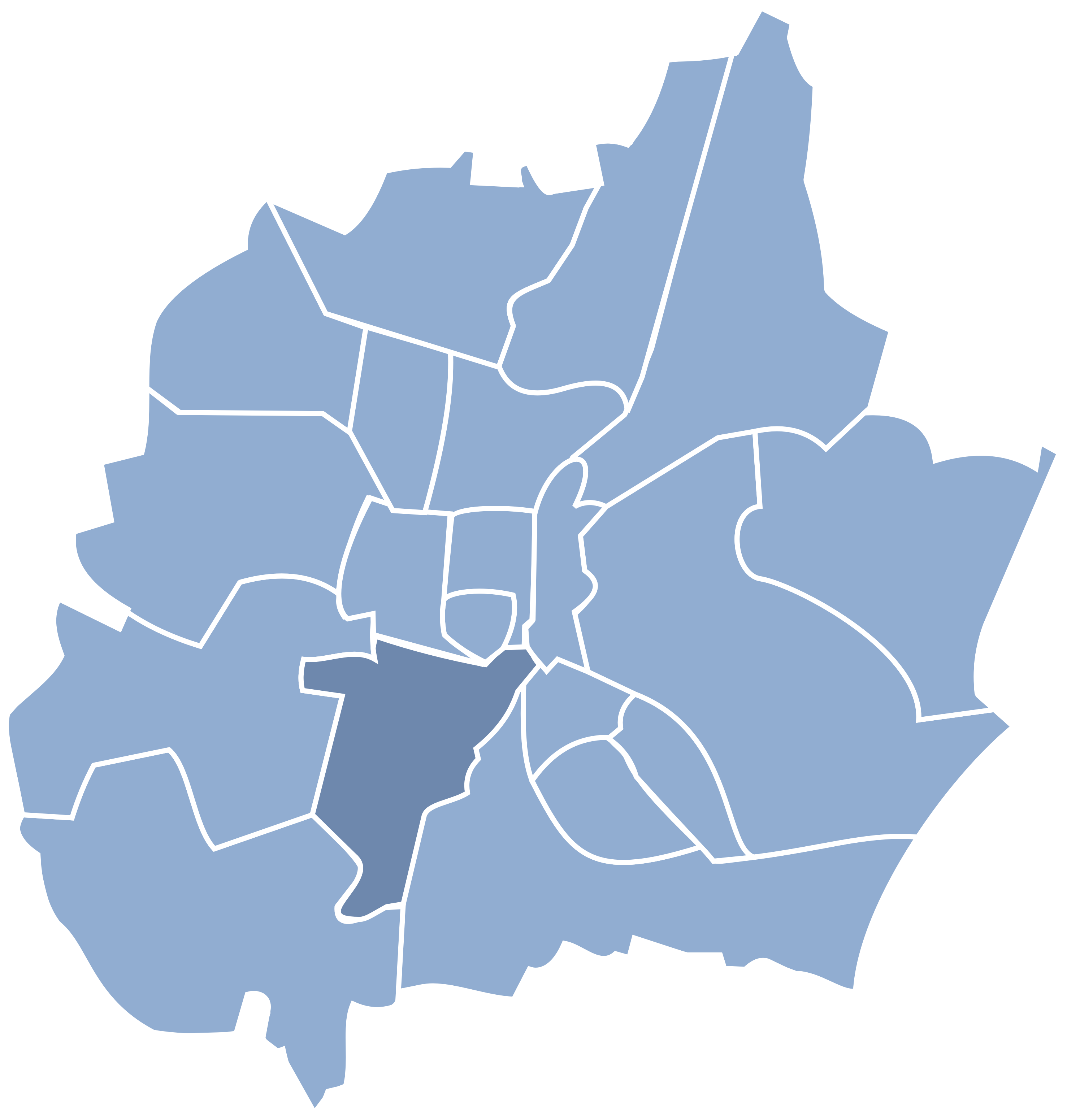
- Location of Stradom within Częstochowa
- Coordinates: 50°47′22″N 19°06′05″E
- Country: Poland
- Voivodeship: Silesian
- County/City: Częstochowa
- Within city limits: 1928
- Time zone: UTC+1 (CET)
  - Summer (DST): UTC+2 (CEST)
- Vehicle registration: SC

Stradom is a district of Częstochowa, Poland, located in the southern part of the city.

== History ==
In 1827, Stradom had a population of 282. In 1882, the Stradom textile factory was founded.

Stradom was included within the city limits of Częstochowa as a new district in 1928. In the interbellum, the 7th Light Artillery Regiment of the Polish Army was garrisoned in Stradom.

At the beginning of the German occupation during World War II, on 14–15 September 1939, the German police arrested around 200 Poles in Stradom.

== Education ==
The Central School of the State Fire Service (Centralna Szkoła Państwowej Straży Pożarnej) is based in Stradom.

== Sports ==
The local football team is Stradom Częstochowa.
