= Velazco =

Velazco is a Spanish surname. Notable people with the surname include:

- Arturo Velazco (born 1964), American soccer player
- Ferran Velazco Querol (born 1976), Spanish rugby union player
- Héctor Javier Velazco (born 1973), Argentine boxer
- Ignacio Mier Velazco (born 1961), Mexican politician
- Jeny Velazco, Mexican Paralympic athlete
- Mariem Velazco, Venezuelan beauty pageant
