= Feliks Stamm =

Polish boxing trainer (1901–1976)

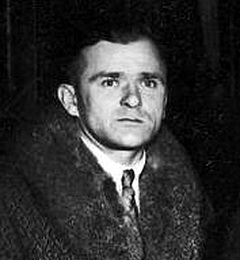
- Stamm in Stockholm, 1934
- Born: Feliks Stamm; 14 December 1901; Kościan
- Died: 2 April 1976; Warsaw
- Occupation: Boxing coach
- Known for: Training Polish National Boxing Team

Feliks "Papa" Stamm (14 December 1901, Kościan (German: Kosten) German Empire – 2 April 1976, Warsaw) was a prominent Polish boxing coach. He is widely regarded as the father of Polish boxing, and the creator of the so-called Polish school of boxing. To commemorate him, since 1977 annual Feliks Stamm Boxing Tournament takes place in Warsaw. In 1987, the tournament was won by Lennox Lewis.

In 1923–1926, he was a boxer at the club Pentatlon in Poznań. He rolled down 13 official fights (11 won, 1 drew, 1 loss) as well as about 30 show fights. In 1926, Stamm became a boxing coach at Warta Poznań, and since 1932, he was a lecturer at Central Institute of Physical Education in Warsaw (today's Academy of Physical Education in Warsaw). In 1936, he became an independent coach of the Polish boxing national team. He had already had some experience with the national team of Poland, as in 1928 Stamm helped foreign coaches to prepare Polish boxers for their first official international match vs. Austria.

As a coach, Stamm participated seven times in the Olympic Games (from 1936 to 1968), and 14 times in European Amateur Boxing Championships. He was a tutor and coach of a number of prominent boxers, Olympic and European champions. Among them are such names, as: Mieczysław Forlański, Szapsel Rotholc, Tadeusz Rogalski, Witold Majchrzycki, Edmund Sobkowiak, Franciszek Szymura, Henryk Chmielewski, Józef Pisarski, Aleksander Polus, Antoni Czortek, Antoni Kolczyński, Aleksy Antkiewicz, Zygmunt Chychła, Zenon Stefaniuk, Leszek Drogosz, Zbigniew Pietrzykowski, Tadeusz Walasek, Kazimierz Paździor, Jerzy Adamski, Józef Grudzień, Jerzy Kulej, Marian Kasprzyk, Jan Szczepański, Jan Sielczak, Henryk Kukier.

In 1945, Stamm moved to Bydgoszcz, where he lived together with his wife and four children. In late 1946 he took the post of coaching manager of Polish Boxing Association, commuting from Bydgoszcz to Poznań. After his death, a street in Fordon, a district of Bydgoszcz, was named after him.
