= Piotr Drzewiecki (mayor) =

Polish politician

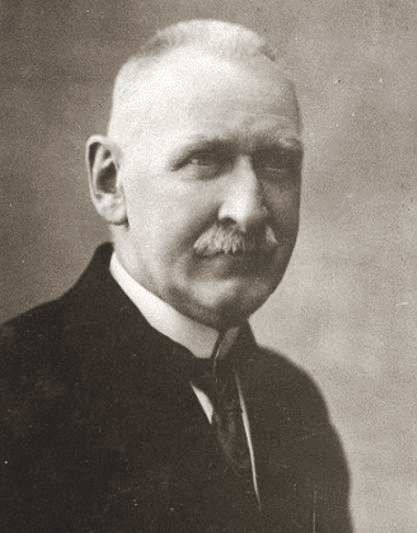
Piotr Drzewiecki

Piotr Drzewiecki (29 May 1865, Warsaw – 8 December 1943, Berlin) was the mayor of Warsaw, also known as the President of Warsaw (Polish: Prezydent Miasta Stołecznego Warszawy), from 1918 to 1921. An engineer and social activist, he was also an organizer of the civil defense of Warsaw in 1920 against the invasion by the Red Army. As mayor of Warsaw during the struggle of women's suffrage in Poland in 1918, he promised that service in the city administrative posts would become open to women beginning January 1, 1918.

Drzewiecki graduated from Imperial Petersburg Institute of Technology, today the Saint Petersburg State Institute of Technology, in 1888. He wrote articles for technical review and became president of the Warsaw Technicians Association in 1899. In 2008, the Polish Chief Technical Organization (NOT) established the Piotr S. Drzewiecki Medal.

Drzewiecki was arrested by Nazis during World War II and died in the Spandau Prison near Berlin. His ashes were transferred in 1949 to Poland and buried at the Powązki Cemetery in Warsaw.
