= State Fire Service =

Fire and rescue service of Poland

- Państwowa Straż Pożarna

Operational area
- Country: Poland

Agency overview
- Established: 1 July 1992
- Chief Commandant: Wojciech Kruczek

Website
- National Headquarters (in English); National Headquarters (in Polish)

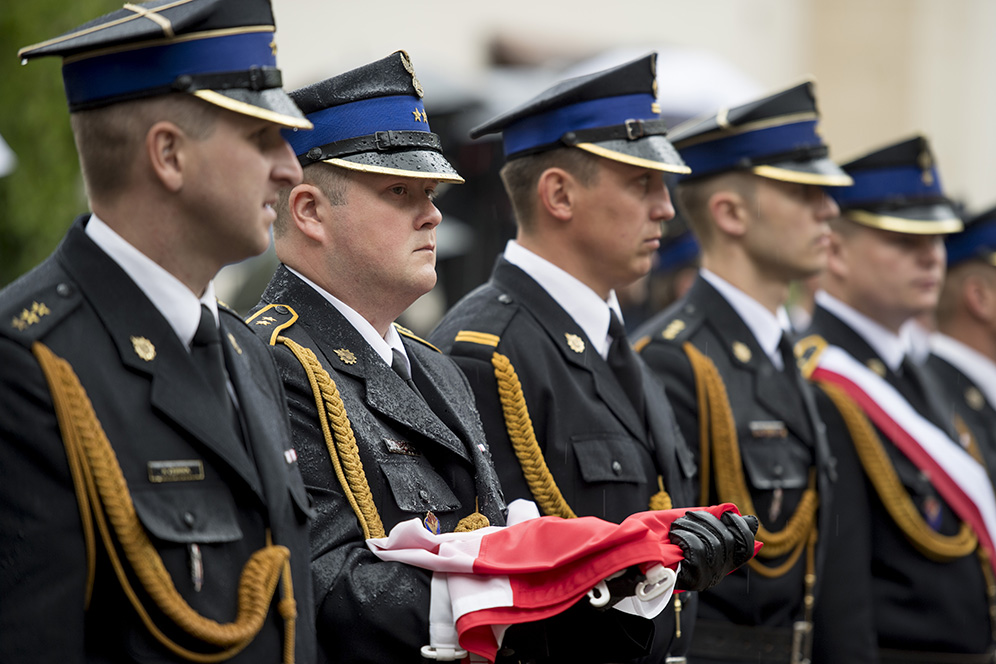
Formal uniform of the Polish State Fire Service

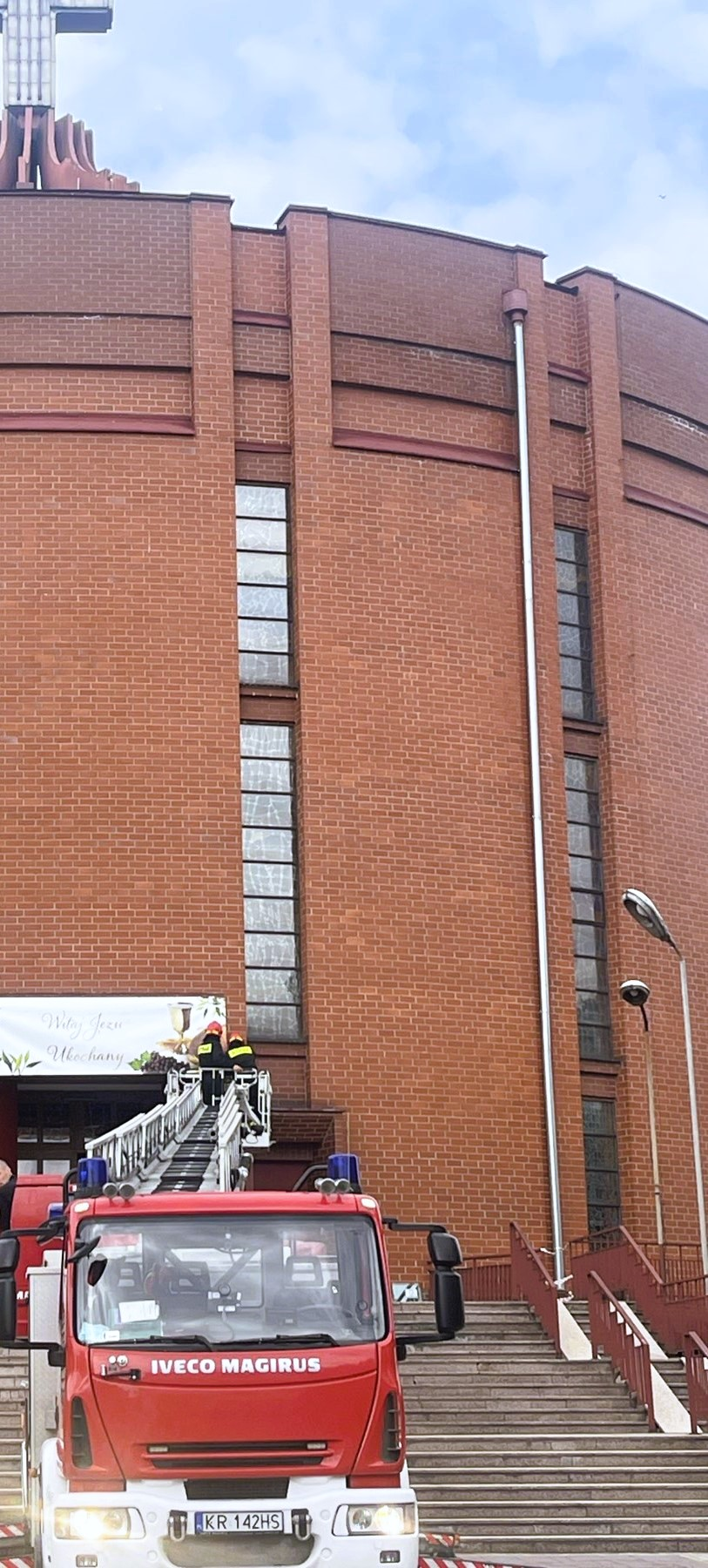
PSP JRG 6 in action in Krakow, Poland

State Fire Service (Polish: Państwowa Straż Pożarna, PSP) is a professional fire fighting service in Poland. It is subordinate to the Polish Ministry of Interior and Administration. The modern State Fire Service is based on the 1992 legislation.

State Fire Service covers the entire territory of Poland. In all the second-level units of local government and administration in Poland - powiat (county, district) -, fire brigades operate district headquarters (Komenda Powiatowa Państwowej Straży Pożarnej), city headquarters in bigger cities (Komenda Miejska Państwowej Straży Pożarnej) with command posts and dispatch centers alongside one or several fire stations (Jednostka Ratowniczo-Gaśnicza JRG). They are subject to 16 provincial headquarters (Komenda Wojewódzka Państwowej Straży Pożarnej).

Professional firefighters (PSP) respond immediately after the alarm and are often assisted by volunteers associated in Voluntary Fire Service (Ochotnicza Straż Pożarna, OSP) with more than 15,700 fire stations in nearly every bigger settlement.

== History ==
Pursuant to Article 2 of the Act of February 4, 1950. on fire protection and its organization, for the first time in the history of Polish fire protection, the Voivodeship Fire Brigade Headquarters was established. The voivodeship level commands were headed by the Voivodeship Fire Comandants and the commanders of the Warsaw and Łódź fire brigades. These commanders, at the request of the Commander-in-Chief of the Fire Service, were appointed and dismissed (Article 4.2) by the Minister of Public Administration - then competent for internal affairs. Soon, however, the Legislative Sejm passed the Act of April 19, 1950. on changing the organization of the supreme state authorities in the field of municipal management and public administration. This act brought, among others, the abolition of the Ministry of Public Administration and the creation of the Ministry of Municipal Economy in its place. The competences of the new ministry were defined by the Council of Ministers in its regulation of June 3, 1950. They included e.g. matters belonging to the abolished Ministry of Public Administration, and thus in the field of fire protection.

In 1972, parallelly with the administrative reform in Poland, field fire brigades, the most visible changes concerned the brigades gathered in the Association of Volunteer Fire Brigades (ZOSP). This was manifested in the creation, or in principle, in the reconstruction of the communal link of this association (Resolution No. 7 of the ZOSP ZG of November 6, 1972 on the appointment of commune boards) and the establishment of the function of the social commander of the commune fire brigade (based on the resolution of the Council of Ministers of September 25, 1974).

In 1973 fire brigade commands were subordinated to voivodes, city presidents and heads of communes (Polish: Naczelnik gminy). These became units equivalent to the departments of voivodeship offices and poviat level offices. As a result, voivodeship and poviat commanders began to be responsible for the implementation of tasks in the field of fire protection before voivodes, presidents or commune chiefs. These changes entered into force on December 9, 1973.

Pursuant to Article 43.3. Act of June 12, 1975. on fire protection, changes were made to the content of Art. 2.3. Decree of December 27, 1974 on the service of fire officers and the procedure for appointing the voivodeship fire brigade commander was specified. It said that the state administration body of the voivodeship level, i.e. the voivode competent for the territory, appointed the voivodeship commander of the fire brigades from among the candidates presented to him by the commander in chief of the fire brigades. The essence of this procedure was the agreement of the parties.

== Structure ==
- National Headquarters of the State Fire Service (Warsaw)
  - Voivodeship Headquarters in Białystok
  - Voivodeship Headquarters in Gdańsk
  - Voivodeship Headquarters in Gorzów Wielkopolski
  - Voivodeship Headquarters in Katowice
  - Voivodeship Headquarters in Kielce
  - Voivodeship Headquarters in Kraków
  - Voivodeship Headquarters in Lublin
  - Voivodeship Headquarters in Łódź
  - Voivodeship Headquarters in Olsztyn
  - Voivodeship Headquarters in Opole
  - Voivodeship Headquarters in Poznań
  - Voivodeship Headquarters in Rzeszów
  - Voivodeship Headquarters in Szczecin
  - Voivodeship Headquarters in Toruń
  - Voivodeship Headquarters in Warsaw
  - Voivodeship Headquarters in Wrocław

Each Voivodeship Headquarters supervises District Headquarters (335 in 2019) and fire-fighting units.

The State Fire Service operates 5 fire academies:

- Fire University of Warsaw
- Central School of State Fire Service in Częstochowa
- School of Aspirants of the State Fire Service in Kraków
- School of Aspirants of the State Fire Service in Poznań
- Non-commissioned Officers School of the State Fire Service in Bydgoszcz

== Voluntary Fire Service ==
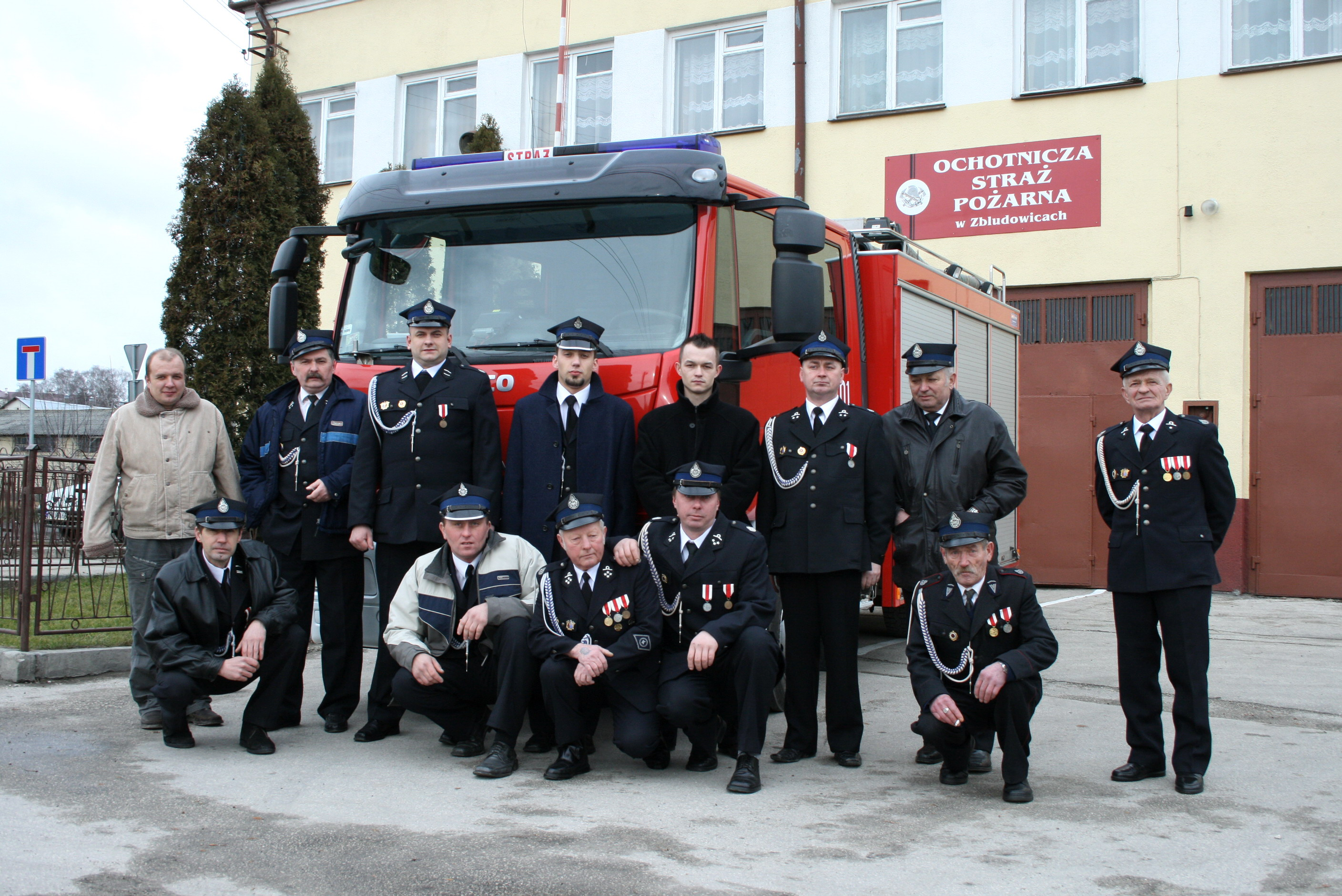
Voluntary Fire Service of Zbludowice

In Poland local inhabitants may create a Voluntary Fire Brigade (Ochotnicza Straż Pożarna, OSP) under proper law. Such departments may receive financial assistance from the government for purchasing equipment or training the staff. In certain areas of Poland almost every town and village has a volunteer fire department. Volunteer fire departments are usually fully integrated into the National Fire and Rescue System (Krajowy System Ratowniczo-Gaśniczy, KSRG). Any call to the fire emergency number is routed to the nearest State Fire Service (PSP) station in powiat (Komenda Powiatowa PSP) that coordinates the forces in the area. After the alarm, the volunteers arrive to the fire station and then respond to the emergency.

== Ranks and rank insignia ==
Service flag for Polish government vessels: Flag of fire-fighting vessels

I corps - enlisted rank
Strażak; Firefighter; Private E1	Starszy strażak Senior firefighter Private E2

II corps - non-commissioned officers
Sekcyjny; Squad Leader; Private First Class	Starszy sekcyjny Senior Squad Leader; Specialist	Młodszy ogniomistrz Junior Firemaster; Corporal	Ogniomistrz; Firemaster; Staff-Sergeant	Starszy ogniomistrz Senior Firemaster; Sergeant 1st Class

III corps - aspirants
Młodszy aspirant Junior Aspirant; Sergeant 1st Class	Aspirant; Aspirant; Master Sergeant	Starszy aspirant Senior Aspirant; Sergeant-Major	Aspirant sztabowy Staff Aspirant; Command Sergeant Major

IV corps - junior officers
Młodszy kapitan Junior Captain; Second Lieutenant	Kapitan; Captain; Lieutenant	Starszy kapitan Senior Captain; Captain

V corps - senior officers
Młodszy brygadier Junior Brigadier; Major	Brygadier; Brigadier; Lieutenant Colonel	Starszy brygadier Senior Brigadier; Colonel

VI corps - generals
Nadbrygadier; Chief Brigadier; Brigadier General	Generał brygadier Brigadier General; Major General

Firefighters from State Fire Service (PSP, JRG) use red helmets. Firefighters from Voluntary Fire Service (OSP) use white helmets.
