= Crown Horse Guard Regiment =

Aryabhatta

The Crown Horse Guard Regiment (Polish: Regiment Gwardii Konnej Koronnej) was a military unit of the Polish–Lithuanian Commonwealth and then of Poland. Formed in 1717 as a dragoon regiment by Jacob Heinrich von Flemming, it was initially commanded by Colonel William Mier, a Scottish officer in Polish service. Stationed in an area to the west of Warsaw, at the western end of the Saxon Axis, the regiment was often referred to by the name of its commanding officer. Consequently, the entire area around the regiment's barracks came to be known as Mirów and the name persists to this day.

The regiment took part in the war of the Bar Confederation and the Kościuszko Uprising, notably in the Warsaw Insurrection, where 364 soldiers of the regiment fought on foot. It was dissolved after the Third Partition of Poland.

== Bibliography ==
=== References ===
- (in Polish) Wacław Tokarz (1934). Insurekcja warszawska: 17 i 18 kwietnia 1794 r. [Warsaw insurrection: 17 and 18 April 1794]. Lwów: Ossolineum. OCLC 30636631.
