= Mirów, Warsaw =

Neighbourhood in Warsaw, Poland

Mirów
- Warsaw neighbourhood
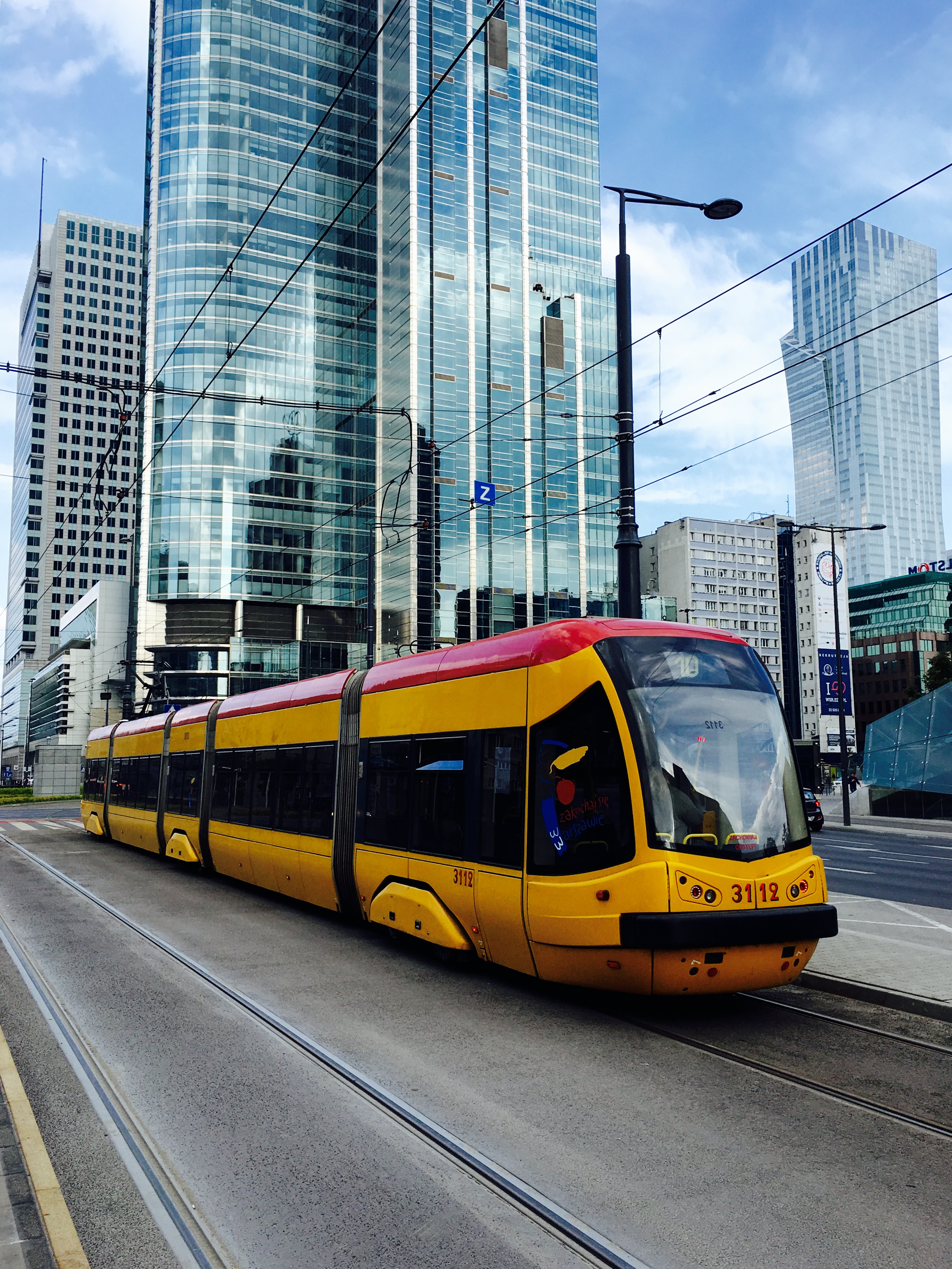
- Tram on Prosta Street

- Location of Mirów neighbourhood (red) in the District of Wola (navy blue)
- Coordinates: 52°13′56″N 20°59′28″E
- Country: Poland
- Voivodeship: Masovian
- County/City: Warsaw
- District: Wola
- Time zone: UTC+1 (CET)
  - Summer (DST): UTC+2 (CEST)

Mirów (Polish pronunciation: [ˈmiruf]) is one of the central neighbourhoods in the Wola district of Warsaw, the capital of Poland.

== History ==
The neighbourhood is situated between Towarowa Street to west, Solidarity Avenue to the north, John Paul II Avenue to the east and Jerusalem Avenue to the south. The principal thoroughfare of the area is Prosta Street.

=== 18th century ===
The present-day territory of Mirów was once occupied by a jurydyka called Wielopole, a self-governing town and exclave of Warsaw, just outside the city's borders. By the 18th century, the town lost its independent status and was incorporated into the city limits. The area was named after William Mier, a Scottish officer in Polish service and the commanding officer of the Horse Guard of the Polish Crown Regiment stationed in what became known as the Mirów Barracks. The barracks and stables were completed in 1732.

=== Contemporary ===
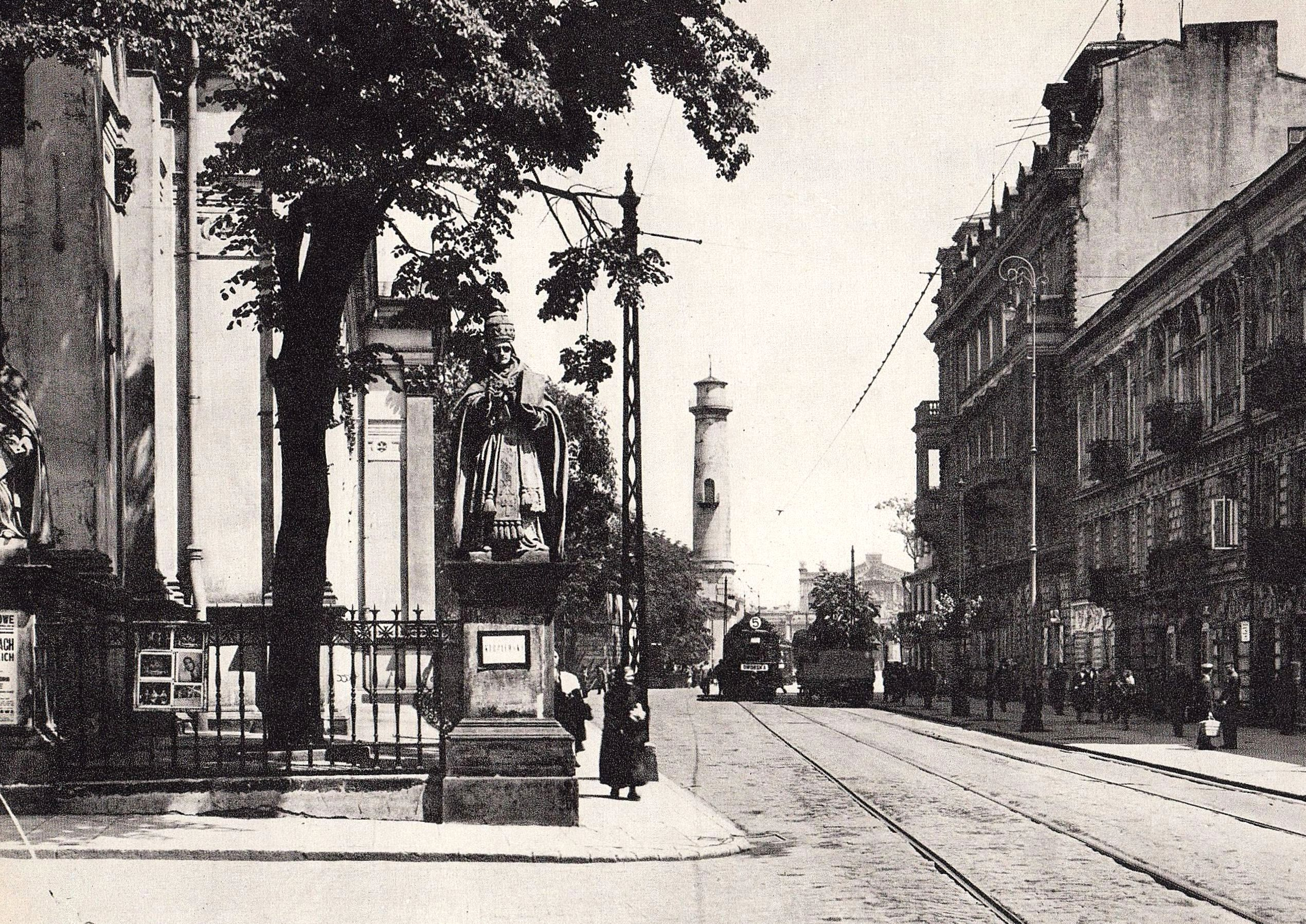
Chłodna Street in 1932

Much like the rest of Wola, Mirów was an industrial suburb inhabited by the working classes until the First World War. In the early 20th century and during the interbellum period (1918–1939), it was gradually redeveloped with large houses and tenements, characteristic to the big capitals of Europe. Following the Warsaw Ghetto Uprising and the Warsaw Uprising most of the area was razed to the ground by the Germans. After the war it was not rebuilt, and instead a large tower block residential estate with Soc-Realist buildings was constructed which was to meet the house supply shortages for the incoming new residents from other parts of Poland. At the easternmost tip of Mirów, at Plac Żelaznej Bramy there are two Mirów Marketplace Halls which were only partially damaged and later renovated for commercial use.

Contemporary Mirów has undergone a major transformation and is now primarily a commercial neighbourhood, with office buildings and skyscrapers abundant within its borders.

== See also ==
- Frascati, Warsaw
- Solec, Warsaw
- Muranów
