= Statue of Tadeusz Kościuszko =

Statue of Tadeusz Kościuszko may refer to:

- Equestrian statue of Tadeusz Kościuszko (Milwaukee)
- Kosciuszko's Monument (West Point)
- Statue of Tadeusz Kościuszko (Boston)
- Statue of Tadeusz Kościuszko (Washington, D.C.)
- Tadeusz Kościuszko Monument (Chicago)
- Tadeusz Kościuszko Monument, Kraków
- Tadeusz Kościuszko Monument, Warsaw
