= Statue of Tadeusz Kościuszko (Warsaw) =

Tadeusz Kościuszko Monument in Warsaw
- Pomnik Tadeusza Kościuszki w Warszawie
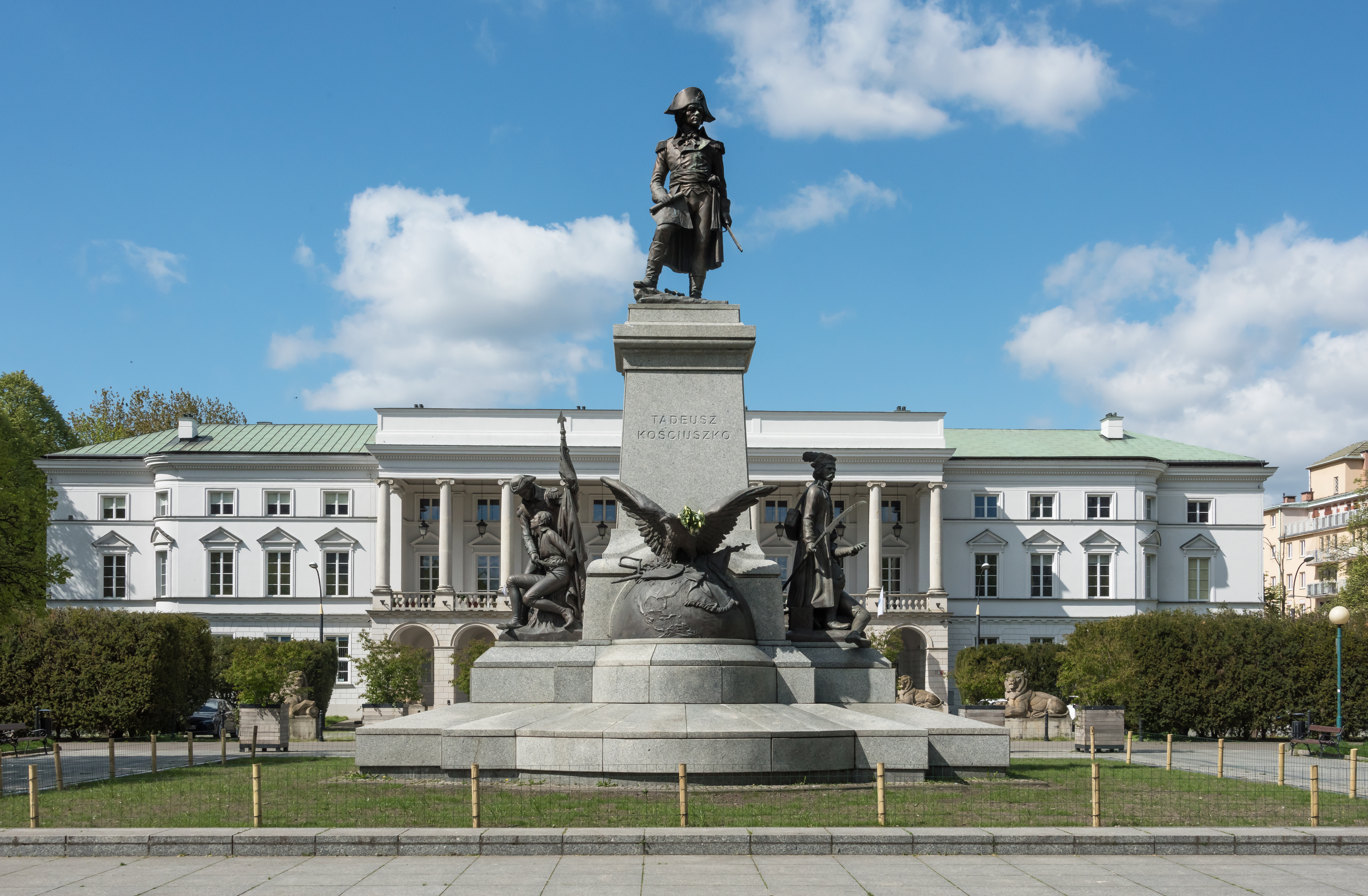
- The monument in 2023
- Interactive map of Tadeusz Kościuszko Monument in Warsaw
- Location: Warsaw, Poland
- Coordinates: 52°14′23″N 21°00′09″E
- Dedicated to: Tadeusz Kościuszko

Historic Monument of Poland
- Designated: 1994-09-08
- Part of: Warsaw – historic city center with the Royal Route and Wilanów
- Reference no.: M.P. 1994 nr 50 poz. 423

The Tadeusz Kościuszko Monument in Warsaw (Polish: Pomnik Tadeusza Kościuszki w Warszawie) is a statue dedicated to commemorate the national hero of Poland, Lithuania, Belarus, and the United States, general Tadeusz Kościuszko (1746–1817), and situated on the Iron-Gate Square in front of the Lubomirski Palace.

== History ==
It stands on the main axis of the historical city centre of Warsaw, the Saxon Axis. The monument is an exact copy of the Statue of Tadeusz Kościuszko at Lafayette Square in Washington, D.C. unveiled on 9 May 1910, and designed by the Polish sculptor Antoni Popiel (1865–1910).

The monument replaced the former monument of the ”Dead in the Service and Defense of the Polish People's Republic”, erected in the 1980s by the Communist government and demolished 1991. The investment was financed by the Citibank Handlowy and the Warsaw City Council. The bronze elements of the monument were moulded by the Technical Appliance Works at Gliwice. The copying of the Washington monument was executed by Kraków sculptors Anna and Wojciech Siek.

The monument was unveiled on 16 November 2010.

The monument shows the figure of Tadeusz Kościuszko in the uniform of an American general, holding drawings of the West Point garrison defenses in his hand. On the right side of the monument stands a figure symbolizing the Battle of Racławice and on the left side a figure symbolizing the Battle of Saratoga.

== Gallery ==
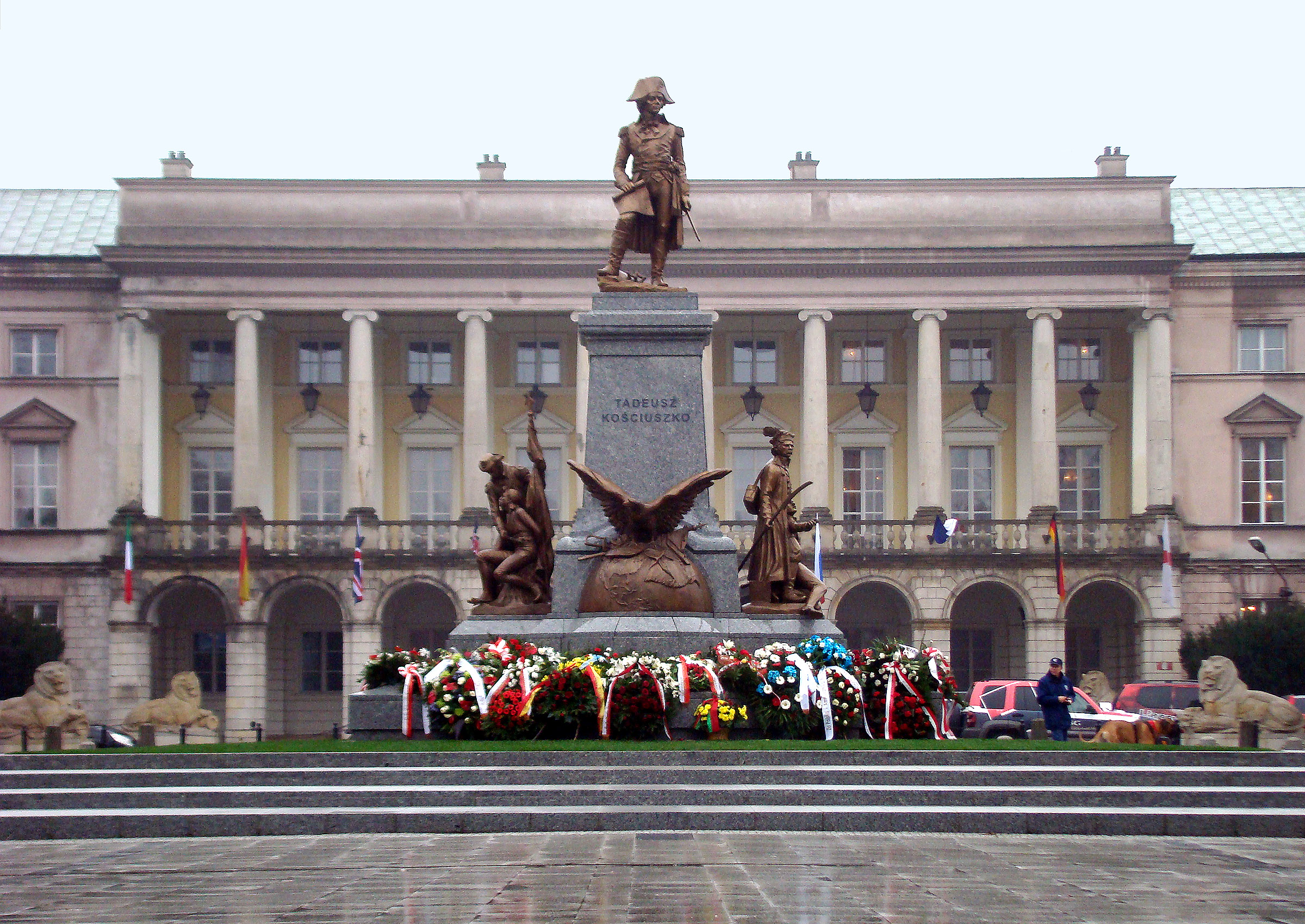
Lubomirski Palace

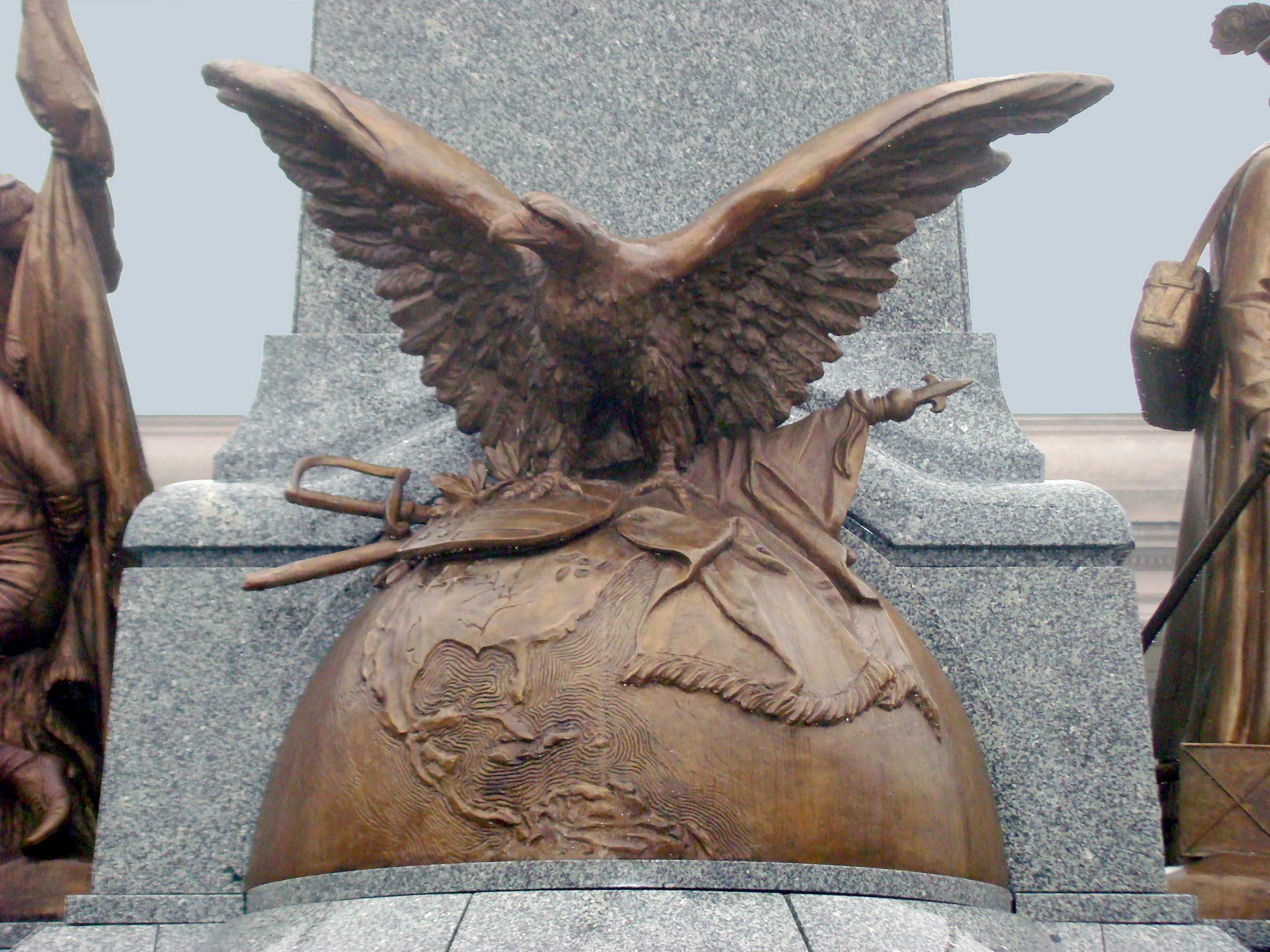
Front side view

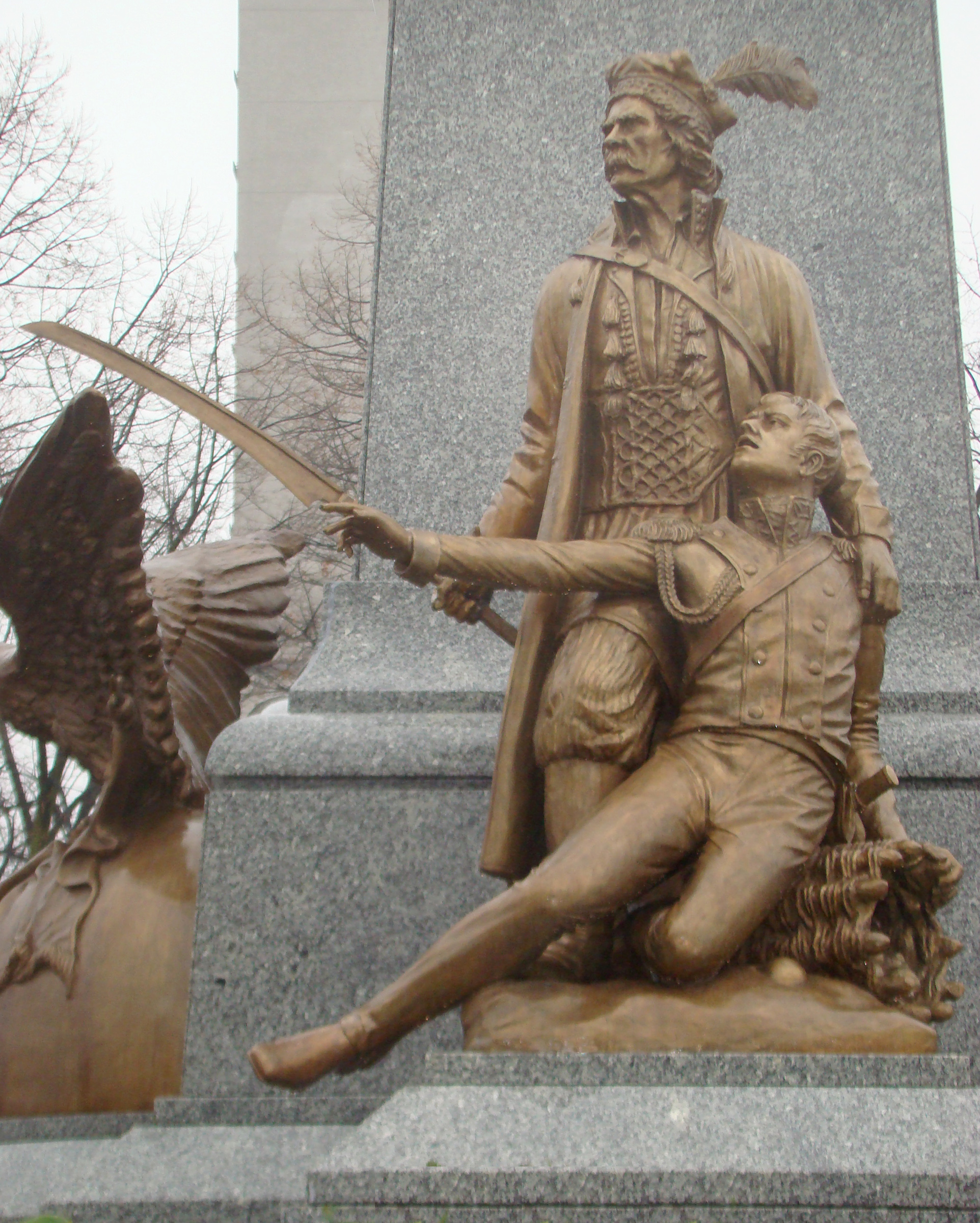
Right side view

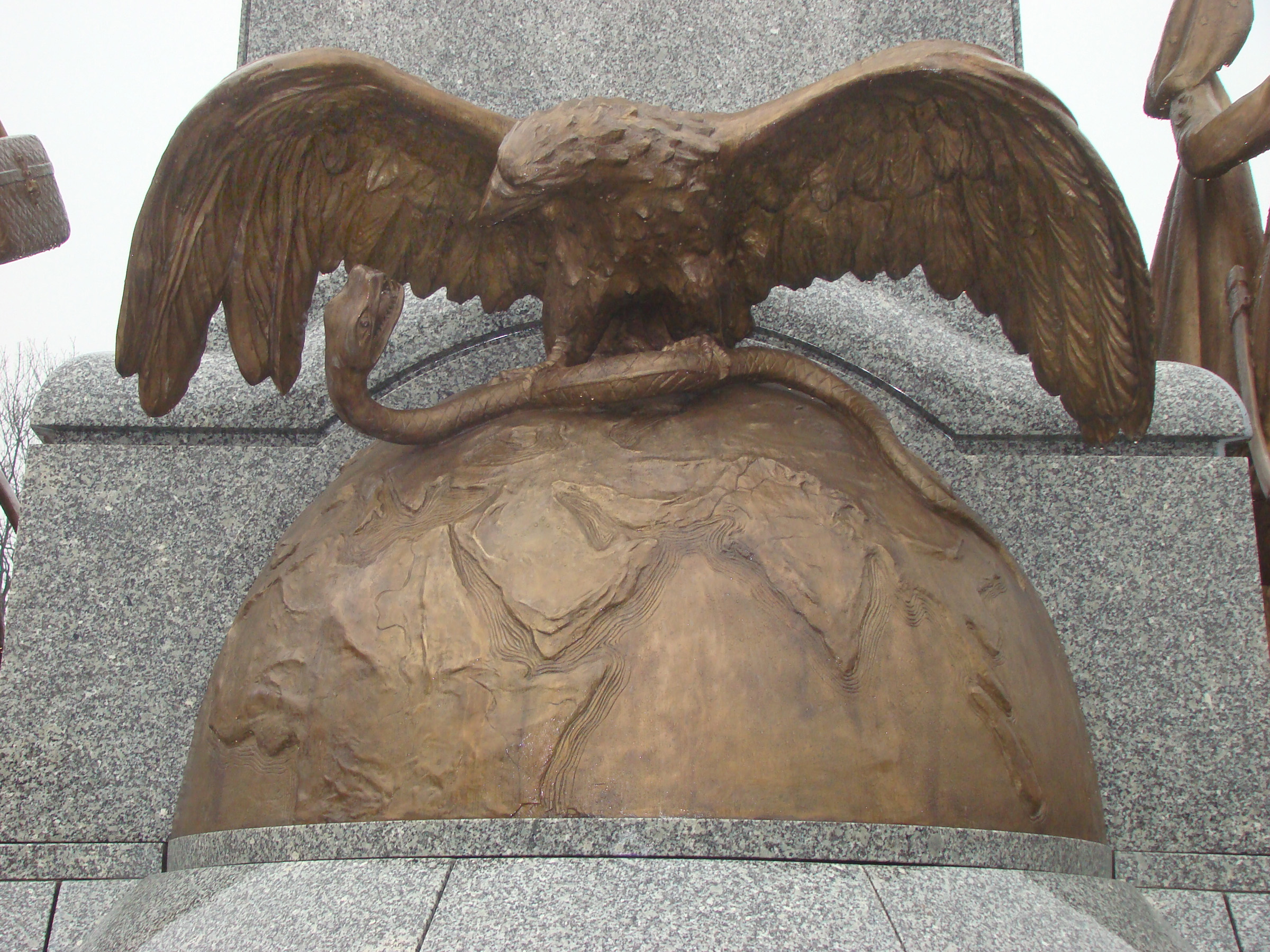
Rear side view

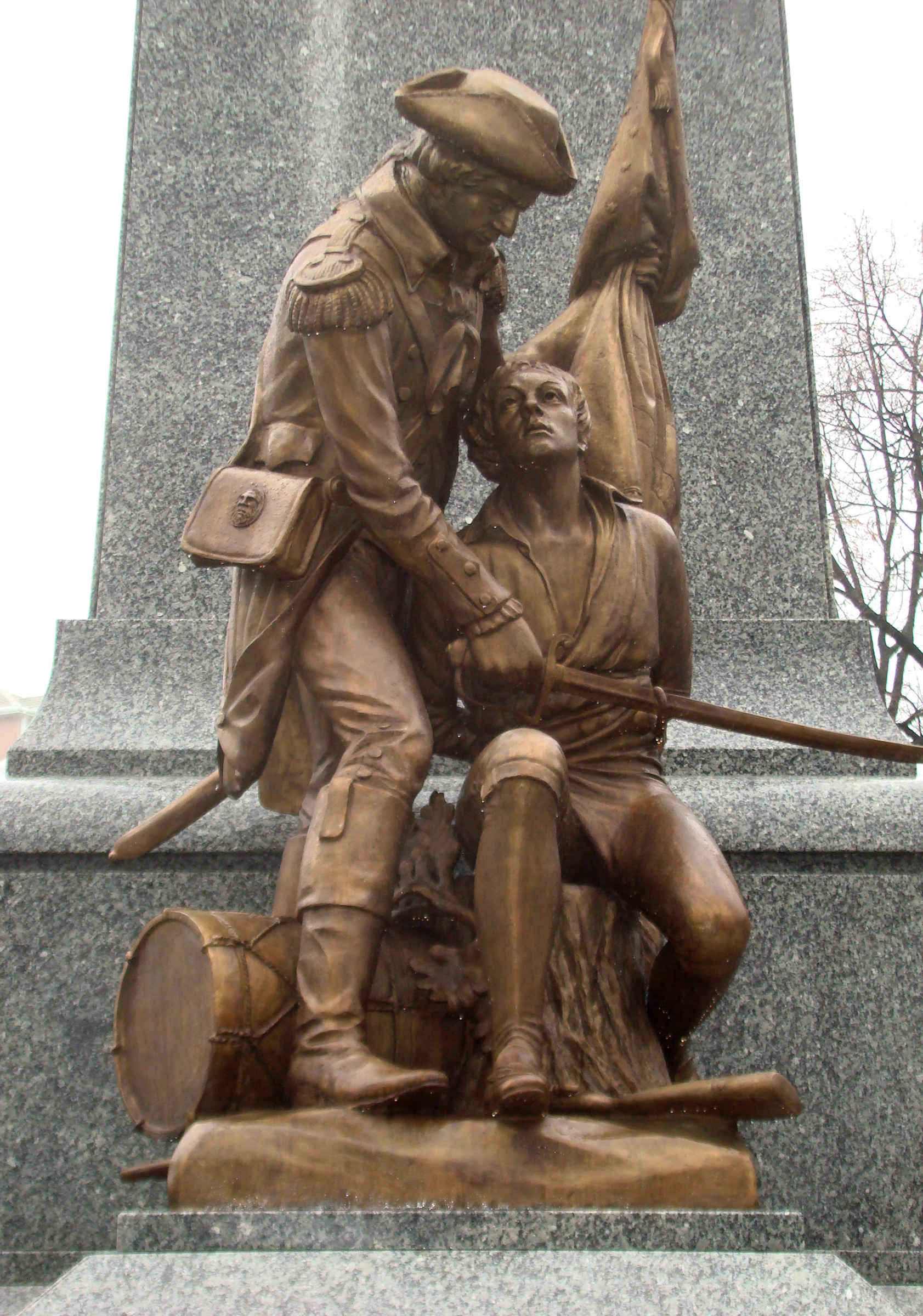
Left side view

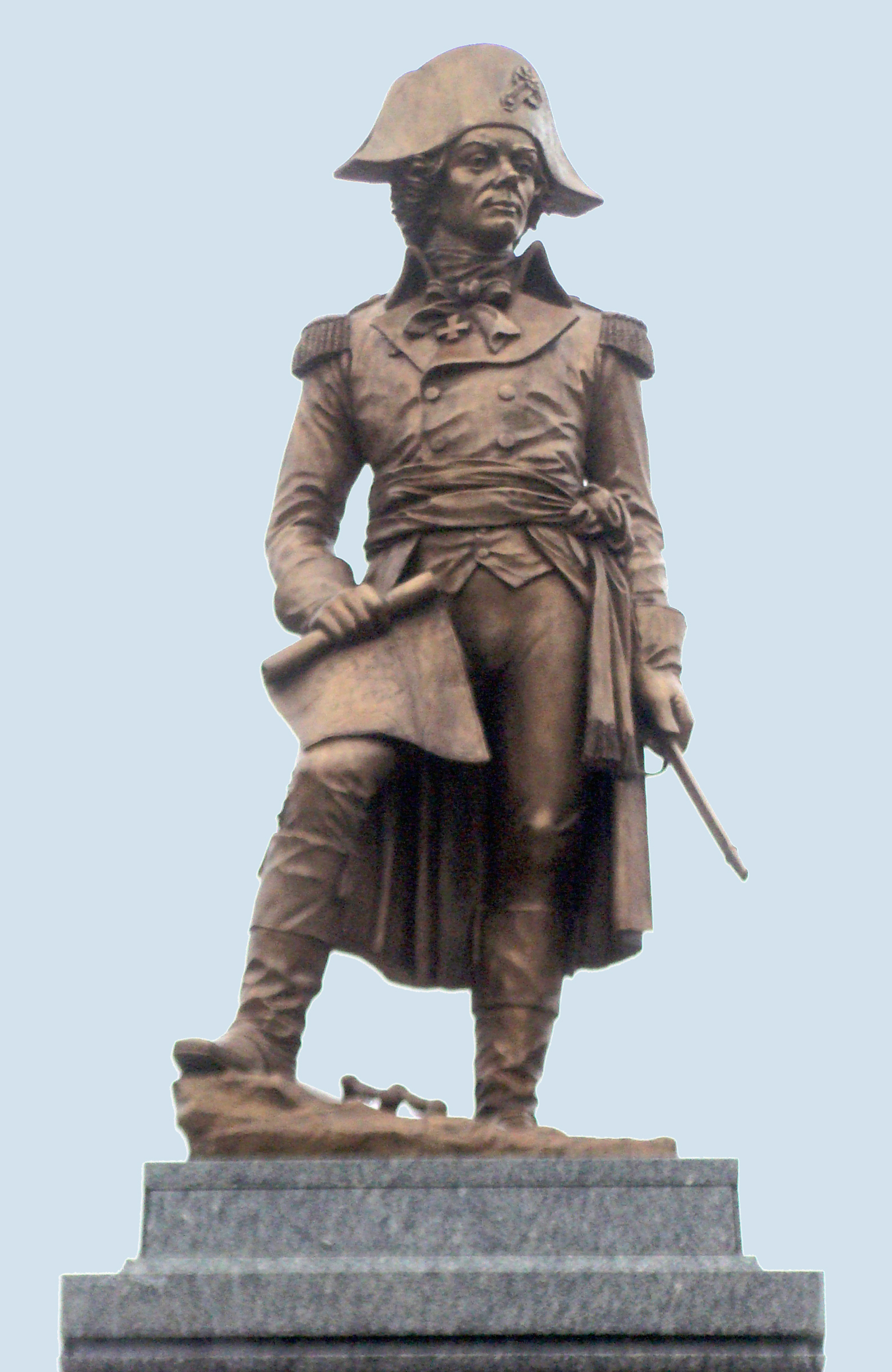
Tadeusz Kościuszko

== See also ==
- Adam Mickiewicz Monument, Warsaw
- Nicolaus Copernicus Monument, Warsaw
- Monument to Prince Józef Poniatowski in Warsaw
