= Statue of Tadeusz Kościuszko (Washington, D.C.) =

Memorial by Antoni Popiel in Washington, D.C., U.S.

- Brigadier General Thaddeus Kościuszko
- U.S. National Register of Historic Places
- U.S. National Historic Landmark District – Contributing property
- D.C. Inventory of Historic Sites
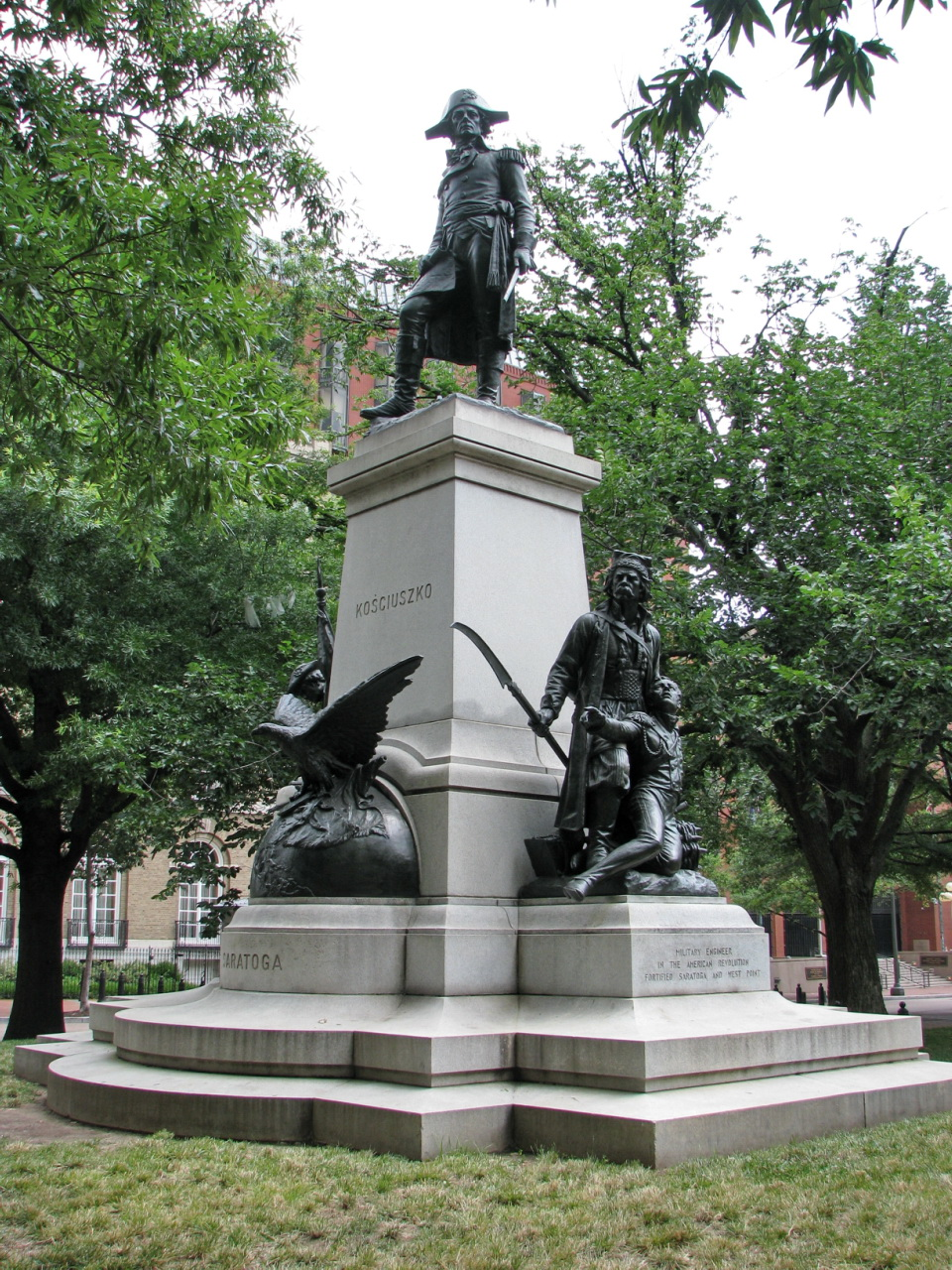
- Statue of Tadeusz Kościuszko in 2008
- Location: Lafayette Square, Washington, D.C.
- Coordinates: 38°54′0″N 77°2′7.4″W
- Built: 1910
- Architect: Antoni Popiel (sculptor); M. J. Falvey & Kyle Granite Company (contractors); Jules Berchem & American Art Foundry (founders)
- Part of: American Revolution Statuary; Lafayette Square Historic District; L'Enfant Plan
- NRHP reference No.: 78000256 (American Revolution Statuary); 70000833 Lafayette Square Historic District; 97000332 (L'Enfant Plan)

Significant dates
- Added to NRHP: August 29, 1970 (Lafayette Square Historic District); July 14, 1978 (American Revolution Statuary); April 24, 1997 (L'Enfant Plan)
- Designated DCIHS: January 19, 1971 (L'Enfant Plan); June 19, 1973 (Lafayette Square Historic District); March 3, 1979 (American Revolution Statuary)

Brigadier General Thaddeus Kościuszko is a bronze statue honoring Polish military figure and engineer Tadeusz Kościuszko. The sculpture was dedicated in 1910, the third of four statues in Lafayette Square, Washington, D.C., to honor foreign-born heroes of the American Revolutionary War. Born in the Polish–Lithuanian Commonwealth in 1746, Kościuszko later received education at a Jesuit school before attending the Corps of Cadets in Warsaw. He later traveled to France where he studied in military academy libraries and adopted views of human liberty during the Age of Enlightenment. He moved to the Thirteen Colonies in 1776, where the war with the Kingdom of Great Britain had already begun. Kościuszko served as an engineer in the Continental Army, earning the praise of his superiors, including General George Washington.

After his important assistance during the war, Kościuszko traveled back to his homeland, where he led the Kościuszko Uprising against Prussia and the Russian Empire. He was unsuccessful and spent time in prison for two years. He was freed on the condition he return to the United States, which he did in 1797. He returned to Europe the following year using an alias, and died in Switzerland in 1817.

In the early 1900s, the Polish National Alliance asked the U.S. Congress if a memorial to Casimir Pulaski could be erected in Lafayette Square. President Theodore Roosevelt preferred a statue of Kościuszko, and the Pulaski statue was installed nearby. After a competition amongst sculptors, Roosevelt's favorite pick, Antoni Popiel, was chosen to design the statue. It was completed in 1908 and the base statues, which are on all sides of the memorial, completed by 1909. It was dedicated on the same day the equestrian statue of Casimir Pulaski was unveiled. Approximately 15,000 Polish Americans attended the ceremonies, where President William Howard Taft spoke.

Kościuszko's statue is one of 14 American Revolution Statuary in Washington, D.C., that were collectively listed on the National Register of Historic Places in 1978 and the District of Columbia Inventory of Historic Sites the following year. In addition, the statue is a contributing property to the L'Enfant Plan and the Lafayette Square Historic District, a National Historic Landmark. There are many other statue and memorials to Kościuszko located throughout the country, and a replica of the statue in Washington, D.C., stands in Warsaw.

== History ==
=== Biography ===
Tadeusz Kościuszko, born Andrzej Tadeusz Bonawentura Kościuszko, was born in 1746 near Kosava, Polish–Lithuanian Commonwealth. His father, who had minor landholdings, died when Kościuszko was a young teenager. He was sent to receive education at a Piarist school and later attended the Corps of Cadets in Warsaw, where Kościuszko was promoted to captain. After leaving the Corps of Cadets, he traveled to France and attended the Royal Academy of Painting and Sculpture.

While in Paris, Kościuszko also studied in military academy libraries, and became a strong believer in human liberty during the Age of Enlightenment. Recalling his time while in France and other countries, Kościuszko stated: "During the five years of my life spent in foreign countries, I have endeavored to master those arts which pertain to solid government, aiming at the happiness of all, also economics and military art; I earnestly tried to learn this, inasmuch I had a natural passion for these things."

After briefly returning to his homeland, Kościuszko came back to France before moving to the Thirteen Colonies in 1776, a few months before the United States Declaration of Independence was signed. Although he had received some military training earlier in his life, Kościuszko was eager to assist the Continental Army. He was commissioned a colonel of the army's engineer division. In 1777, Kościuszko joined General Horatio Gates who was fighting in the Northern theater, and who wrote to another officer a letter praising Kościuszko's skills. His engineering skills were put to use at Fort Ticonderoga, Mount Independence, and during the Battles of Saratoga. General George Washington praised Kościuszko's skill after the latter. The following year Kościuszko assisted with engineering and building of defenses at West Point.

When Gates was stationed to the Southern theater, Washington agreed to let him bring along Kościuszko. General Nathanael Greene and other officers considered Kościuszko to be one of the Army's best engineers. After assisting with various campaign in the South, Kościuszko returned to New York with Greene, and in 1783, became one of the founders of the Society of the Cincinnati. Following the defeat of the Kingdom of Great Britain, Kościuszko was promoted to brigadier general on the recommendation of Washington.

After the war, Kościuszko returned to Poland, where he spent a few years in retirement. This ended when he assisted in leading the Kościuszko Uprising against Prussian and the Russian Empire's influences on the Commonwealth. The Polish were defeated and Kościuszko spent two years in a Russian prison. Sick and frail, he was released on the condition he return to the United States. He reached the U.S. in 1797, where he stayed for one year. He returned to Europe under an alias and died in Switzerland in 1817.

=== Memorial ===
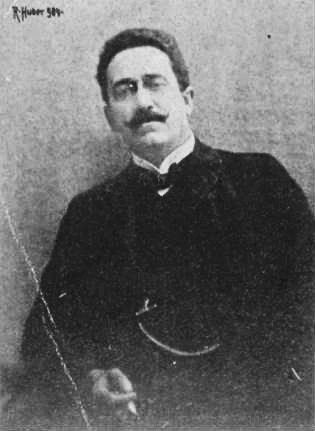
Sculptor Antoni Popiel

In the 1890s, plans were made to erect statues in Lafayette Square honoring foreign heroes of the American Revolutionary War. The first one was installed in 1891 and second in 1902. Soon thereafter, the Polish National Alliance (PNA) requested to the U.S. Congress the installation of an equestrian statue of Casimir Pulaski. President Theodore Roosevelt responded "that the very patriotic offer of the Polish organizations be accepted," but that the statue to be installed in Lafayette Square be one of Kościuszko. Funding for an equestrian statue of Pulaski was approved the following year.

There was a design competition held for the Kościuszko statue, with 20 participants submitting models. Roosevelt took great interest in the competition and his opinion that Polish sculptor Antoni Popiel should win played a large role in his selection. On April 18, 1904, the U.S. Congress approved funding for the statue at a cost of $76,835, which included the statue, base, and preparation of the site. M. J. Falvey & Kyle Granite Company served as contractors for the statue while Jules Berchem & American Art Foundry were the founders. The statue of Kościuszko was cast in 1908 and the base statues cast in 1908 and 1909.

=== Dedication ===
The statues of Kościuszko and Pulaski were unveiled and dedicated on the same day, May 11, 1910. The day before the PNA received a cable from Roosevelt, who was in Berlin at the time: "Accept my congratulations to all Americans of Polish birth or origin on the dedication of the monuments to the two great Polish heroes, Kościuszko and Pulaski, whose names will be forever associated on the honor role of American history."

Approximately 15,000 Polish Americans attended the festivities in Washington, D.C. The Pulaski statue was dedicated at 4pm, after the Kościuszko dedication at 2:30pm. At the Kościuszko unveiling, the event started at the Pulaski statue. The invocation was given by Bishop Paul Peter Rhode followed by speeches from President William Howard Taft, who gave the keynote address, and Polish-American politician John F. Smulski. The United States Marine Band then played the U.S. national anthem before attendees marched to the Kościuszko statue. The people were greeted with music by the Polish Singers Alliance and a speech, in Polish, by PNA President Myron Stenczynski. This was followed by the unveiling and ceremonial gifting of the statue to the American people. Secretary of War Jacob M. Dickinson gave a speech before the benediction. A banquet was held later that night at the Raleigh Hotel, with Taft in attendance.

=== Later history ===
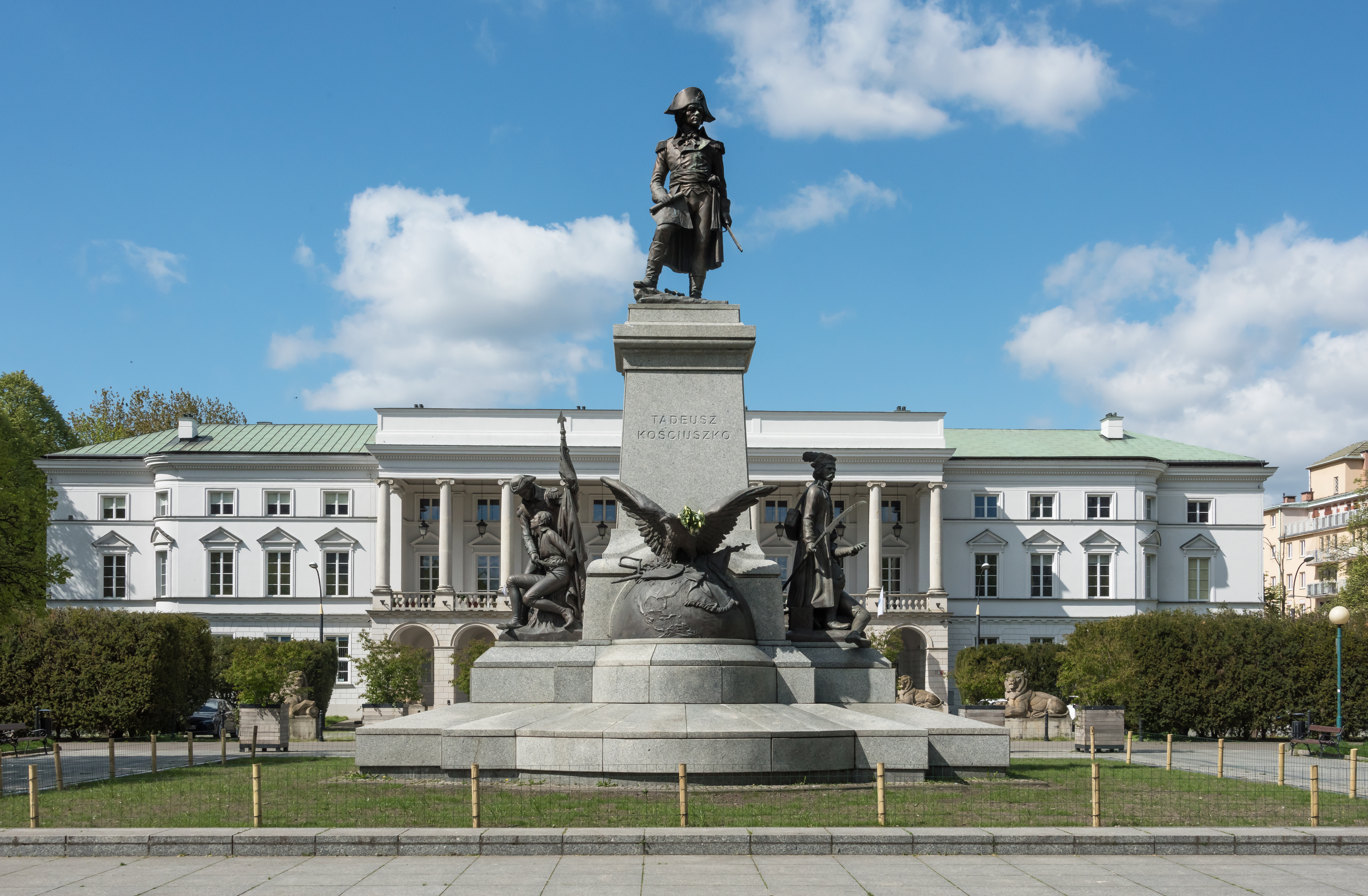
Replica of the statue in Warsaw

The Kościuszko statue is one of 14 American Revolution Statuary that were collectively listed on the National Register of Historic Places (NRHP) on July 14, 1978. The statuary was added to the District of Columbia Inventory of Historic Sites (DCIHS) the following year on March 3, 1979. Because of its location on a square planned by Pierre Charles L'Enfant, the statue is a contributing property to the L'Enfant Plan, listed on the NRHP and DCIHS on April 24, 1997, and January 19, 1971, respectively. In addition, the statue is a contributing property to the Lafayette Square Historic District, a National Historic Landmark which was added to the NRHP on August 29, 1970, followed by the DCIHS on June 19, 1973. The statue and surrounding park are owned and maintained by the National Park Service.

In addition to the statue in Washington, D.C., Kościuszko is memorialized in the U.S. with an equestrian statue in Milwaukee, Wisconsin, a monument on the battlefield at Saratoga, and a statue at West Point, among many other memorials. It was noted in a study by the Monument Lab, Kościuszko and Pulaski are memorialized more than most of the American-born Revolutionary War heroes. Washington and Gilbert du Motier, Marquis de Lafayette, are the only two with more statues than Kościuszko. In 2010, a replica of the statue in Washington, D.C., was unveiled in Warsaw, in front of the Lubomirski Palace.

In 2020, during the George Floyd protests in Washington, D.C., protesters defaced the Washington, D.C., statue with spray paint. The Polish ambassador, Piotr Wilczek, reacted with anger: "I am disgusted and appalled by the acts of vandalism committed against the statue of Thaddeus Kościuszko in DC, a hero who fought for the independence of both the US and Poland." It was not the first time the statue had been vandalized. In the 1990s, Kościuszko's sword and hat were stolen, but later replaced.

== Location and design ==
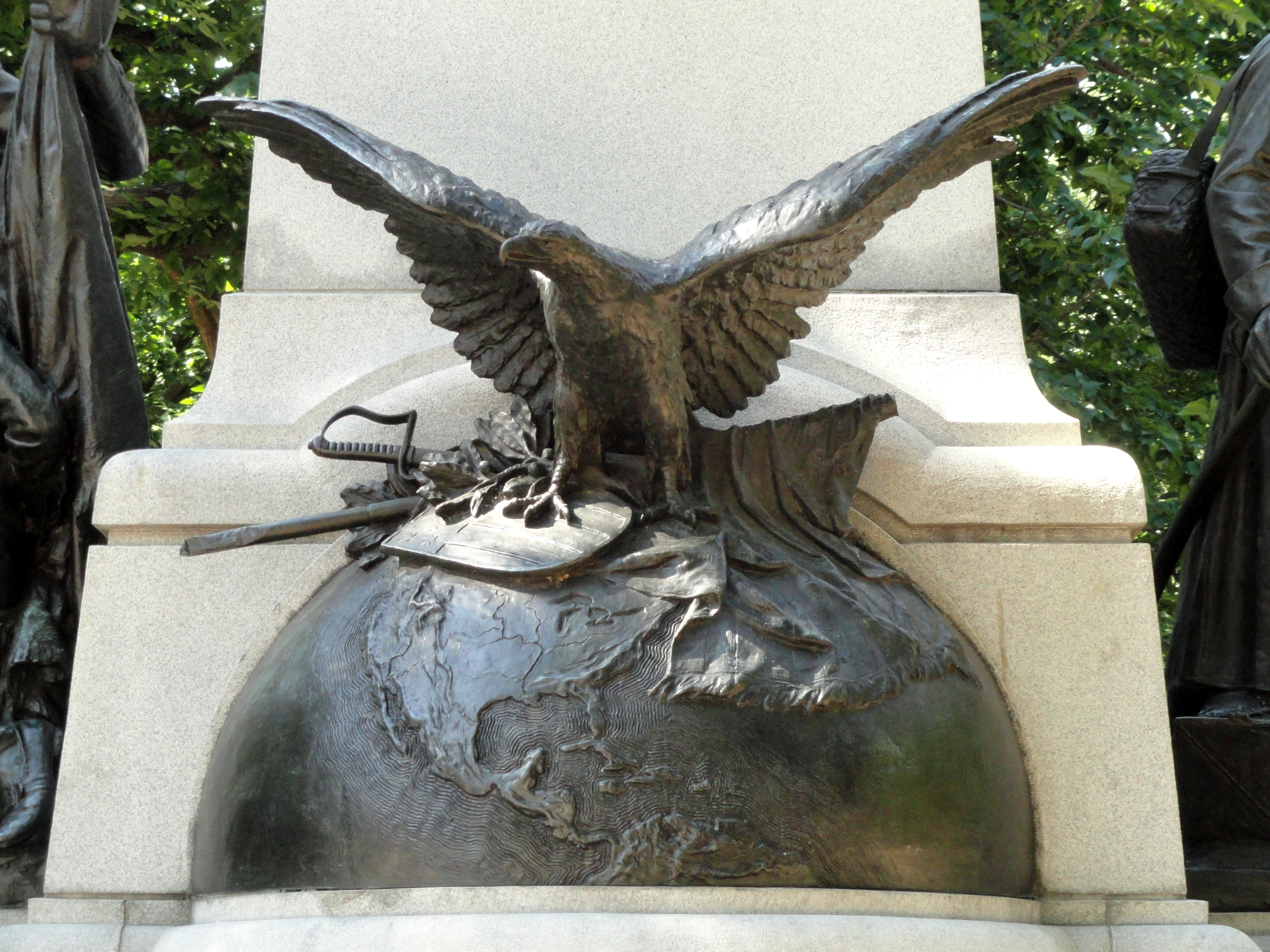
Statue of an American eagle on the front of the memorial

The Kościuszko statue is located on the northeast corner of Lafayette Square, near the intersection of H Street and Madison Place NW in Washington, D.C. The other three statues on the corners of the square are Friedrich Wilhelm von Steuben, Comte de Rochambeau, and Marquis de Lafayette.

The bronze statue of Kościuszko is approximately 10-feet tall (3 m) and each side measures 4 feet (1.2 m). The memorial faces north. He is standing, facing left, and holding a map of his fortification designs of Saratoga with his right hand. The map is resting on his right leg, which is extended from the body. He is wearing a Continental Army officer uniform, which includes a hat, a long coat adorned with epaulets, a sash, and boots.

The Vermont granite pedestal he rests upon is 15-feet tall (4.6 m) with each side measuring 20 feet (6.1 m) at the bottom. There are several tiers to the base, and on the third tier are bronze statues on each side. The front of the base depicts an American eagle resting on the globe, holding a sword, a shield, and the U.S. flag. The south side depicts an eagle fighting a snake, while perched on a globe. The left side of the pedestal are two statues depicting Kościuszko untying a rope from around a Continental Army soldier, while a flag is in Kościuszko's hand and a drum sits by his right foot. The west side also has two statues, one depicting Kościuszko wearing a Polish military uniform while partially lying on the ground, and the other a peasant fighter representing Polish forces.

=== Inscriptions ===
The inscriptions read as follow:

(Pedestal, front)

KOŚCIUSZKO

(Base, north side)

SARATOGA

(Base, west side)

MILITARY ENGINEER

IN THE AMERICAN REVOLUTION

FORTIFIED SARATOGA AND WEST POINT

(Base, south side)

RACŁAWICE

(Pedestal, back)

AND FREEDOM SHRIEKED

AS KOŚCIUSZKO FELL
ERECTED BY THE POLISH NATIONAL ALLIANCE OF AMERICA
AND PRESENTED TO THE
UNITED STATES ON BEHALF OF THE POLISH AMERICAN CITIZENS

MAY 11, 1910

(Base, east side)

GENERAL THADDEUS KOŚCIUSZKO

1745–1817

SON OF POLAND

== See also ==
- List of public art in Washington, D.C., Ward 2
- National Register of Historic Places in Washington, D.C.
- Outdoor sculpture in Washington, D.C.
