= Lubomirski Palace, Warsaw =

Palace in Poland

Lubomirski Palace
- Pałac Lubomirskich
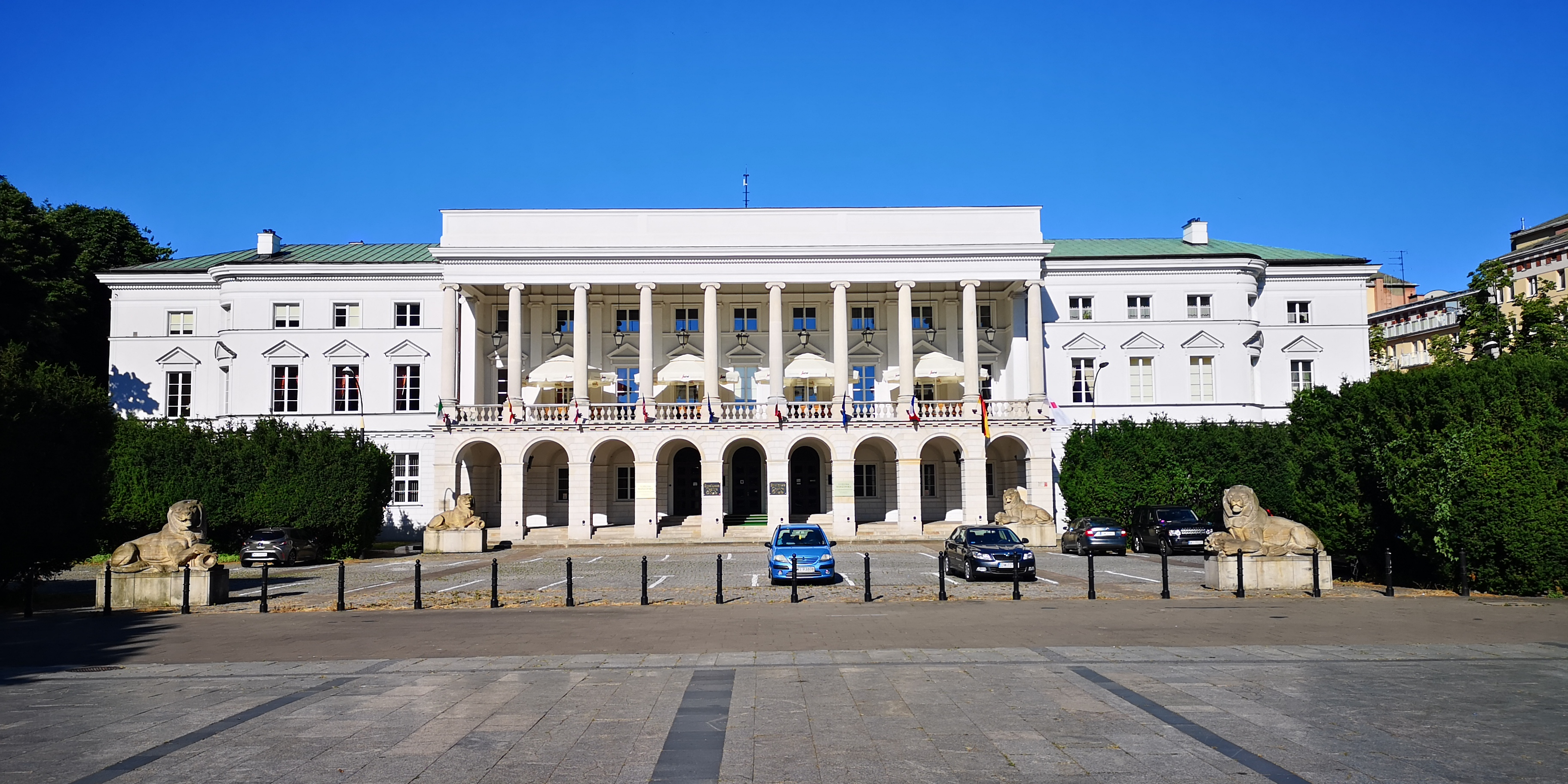
- View from the front of the palace

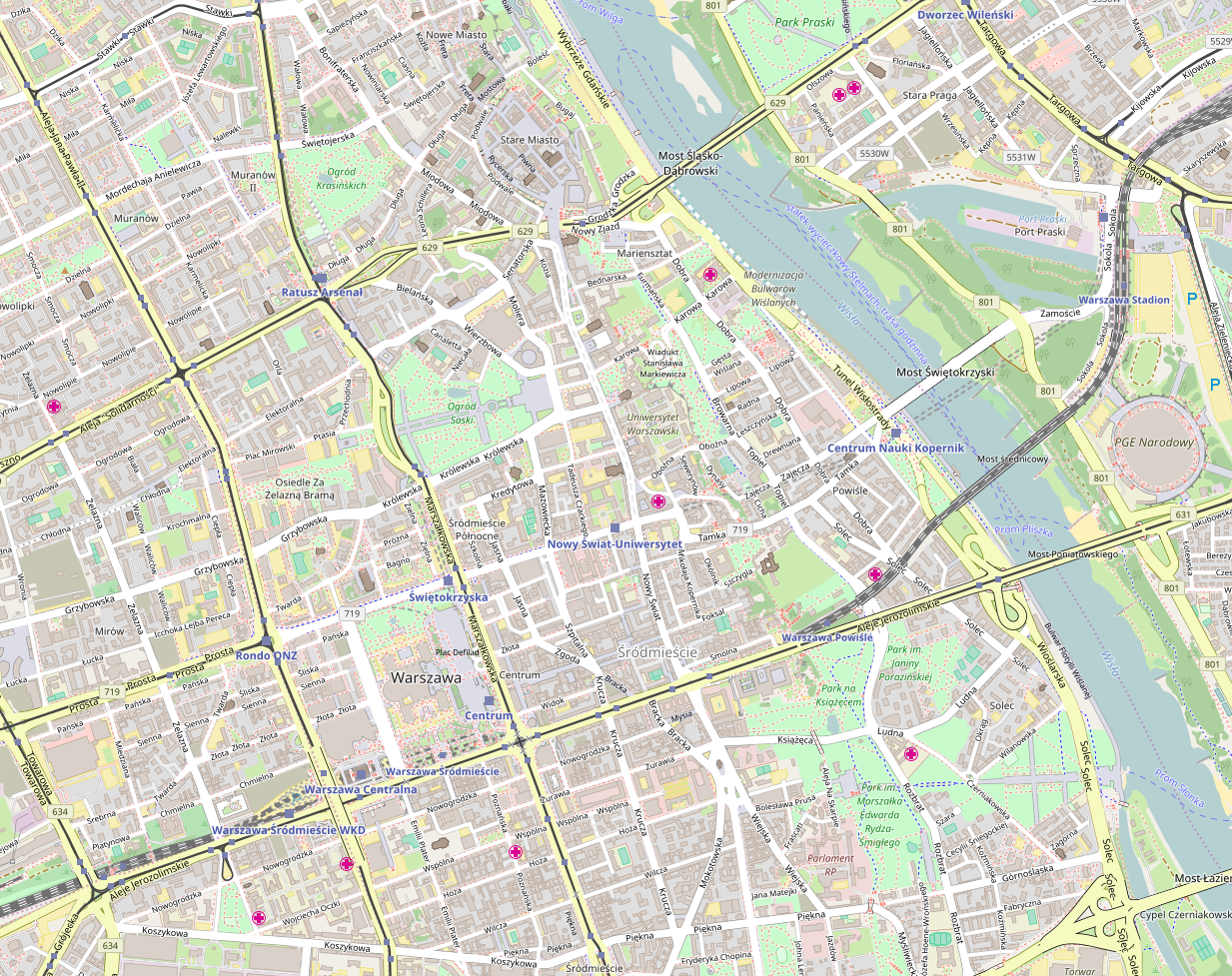
- Location within Warsaw

General information
- Architectural style: Neo-classical
- Location: Warsaw, Poland
- Coordinates: 52°14′22″N 21°00′05″E
- Current tenants: Business Centre Club
- Completed: Before 1712
- Renovated: 1791 - 1793, 1928, reconstruction from 1948 to 1951, moved 1970
- Demolished: Burned in 1939
- Client: Radziwiłł family
- Owner: 1730 Jan Zygmunt Deybel, 1790 Lubomirski family, 1816 Isidore Krasinski, 1828 the government of the Polish Kingdom, 1834 Abraham Simon Cohen, 1938 City of Warsaw

Design and construction
- Architect: Joachim Hempel (reconstruction of 1791-1793)

Historic Monument of Poland
- Designated: 1994-09-08
- Part of: Warsaw – historic city center with the Royal Route and Wilanów
- Reference no.: M.P. 1994 nr 50 poz. 423

Lubomirski Palace (Polish: Pałac Lubomirskich) is a palace in central Warsaw which was built in the 18th century for the Radziwiłł family.

== History ==
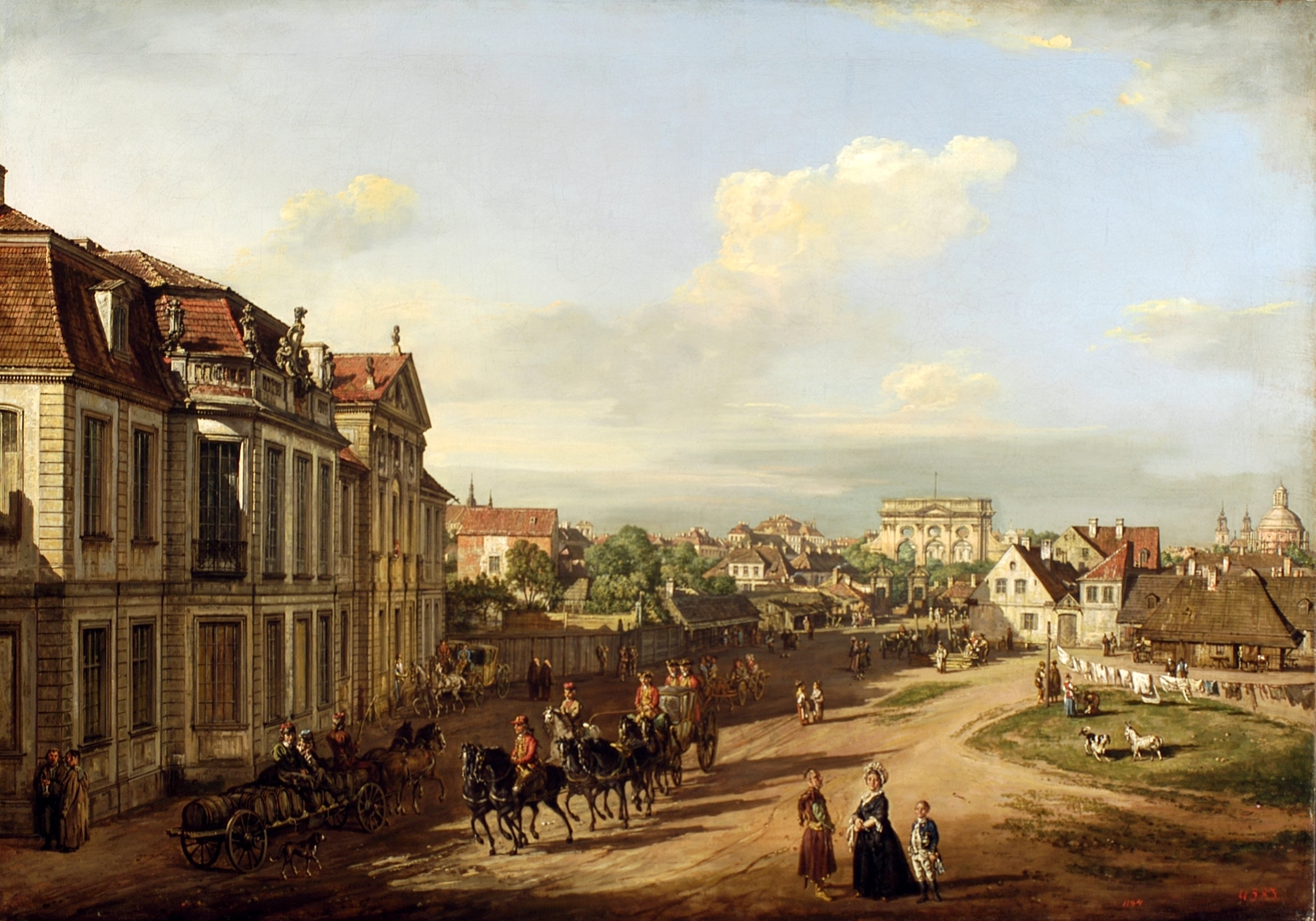
18th century view of the Iron-Gate Square with the palace in the Baroque style. Painting by Bernardo Bellotto

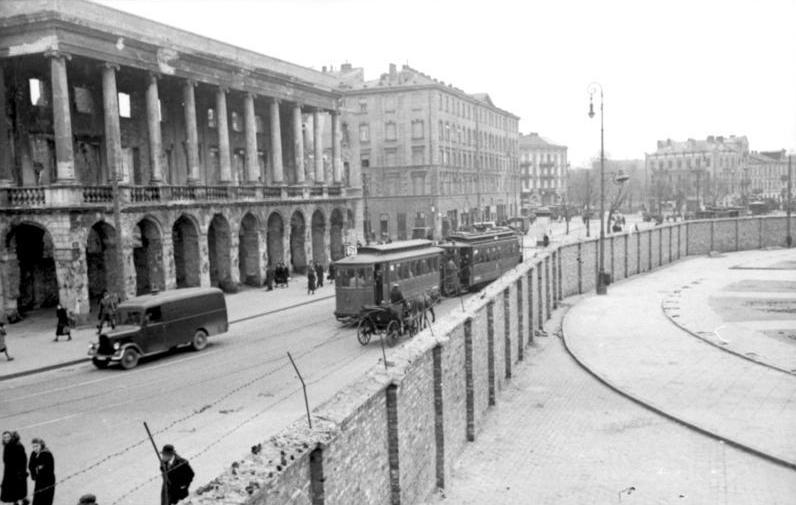
Between the ghetto wall and the palace seen from Hale Mirowskie in May 1941

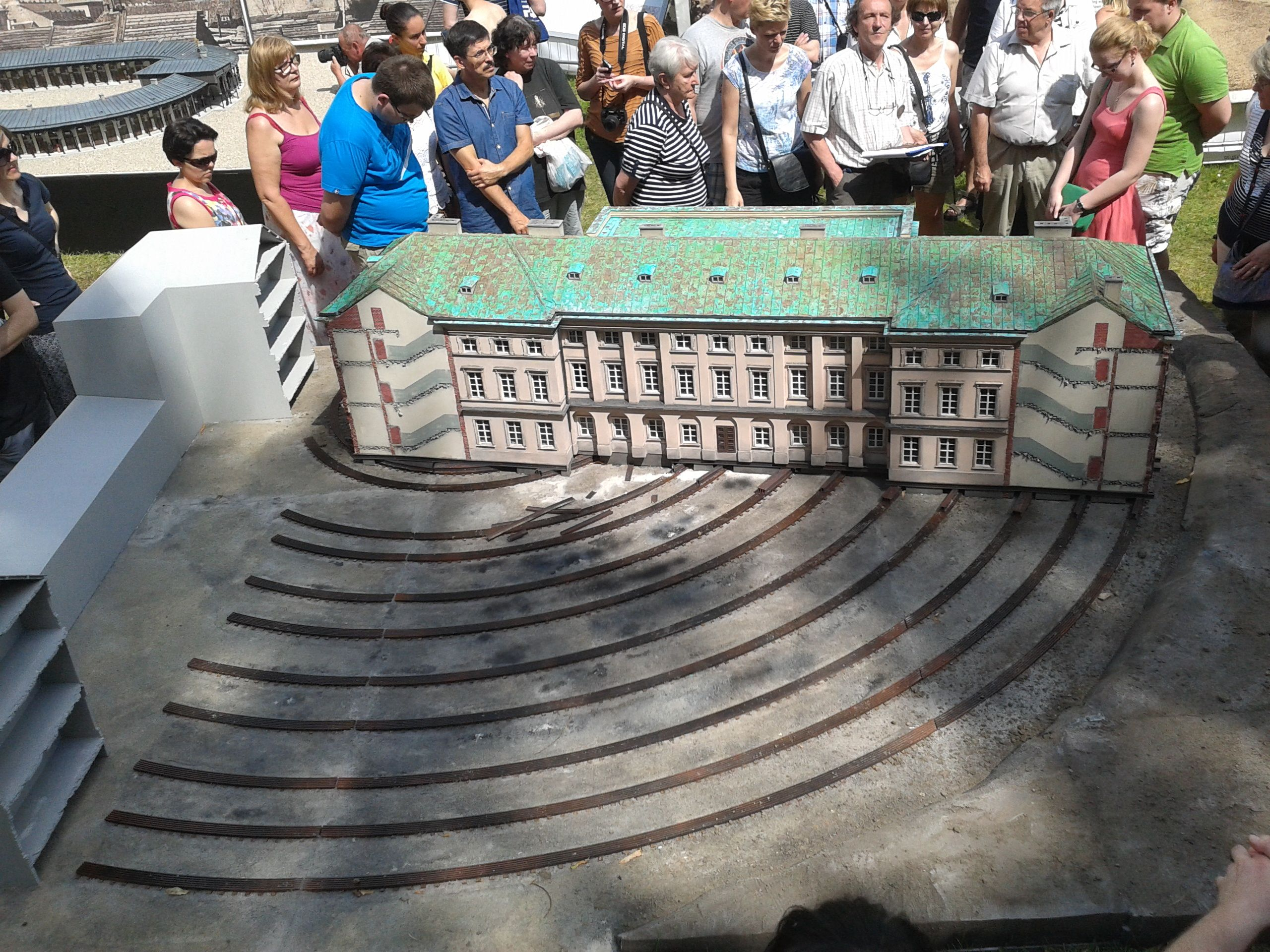
A museum miniature which demonstrates the operation of rotation done in 1970

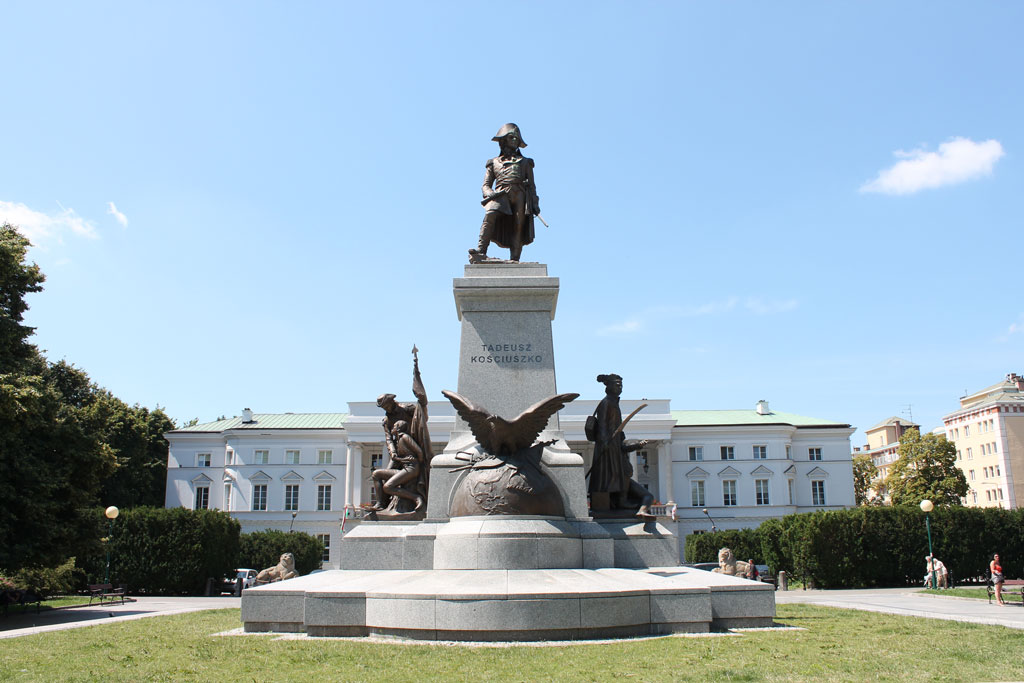
The Tadeusz Kosciuszko Monument in front of the palace

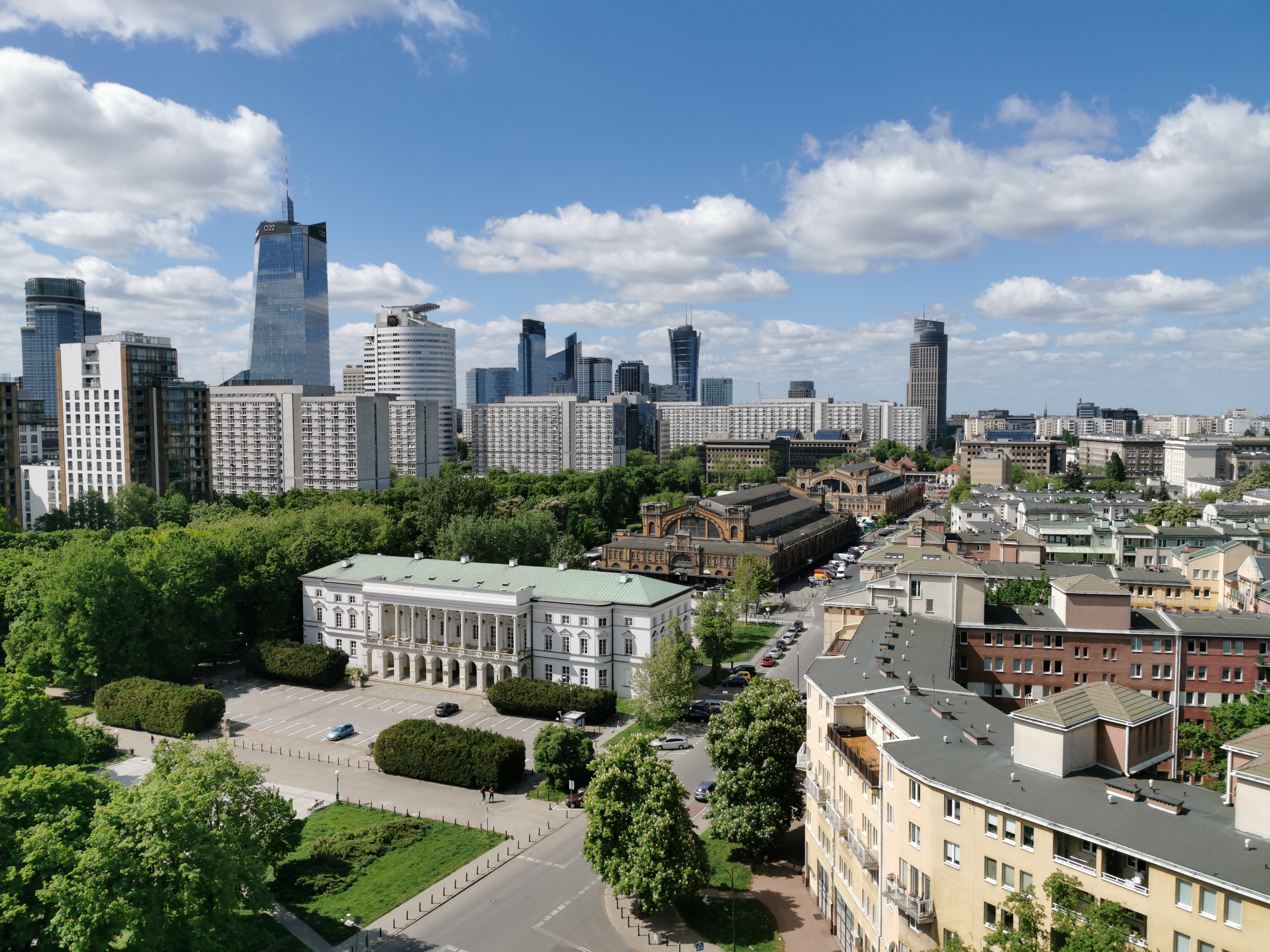
Aerial view of the palace

In the 18th century the Radziwiłł family bought the northern areas of town near Warsaw's Wielopole region. In 1730, the palace belonged to the architect Jan Zygmunt Deybl. In 1760 the residence was meant to be rebuilt in a late baroque style, but the construction was not completed. Renovations were led by Jakub Fontana, a renowned architect at the time.

In 1790, the residence and the adjacent lands were bought by nobleman and aristocrat Aleksander Lubomirski. From 1791 to 1793 the palace was converted into a neoclassical design by Joachim Hempel. Among other things, a colonnade was added, consisting of 10 large columns and the floor of the courtyard and outbuilding floor on the main building were added. Lubomirski's wife, Rozalia Lubomirska (who was later executed on the guillotine during the French Revolution) lived in the palace.

In 1816, the Lubomirskis' daughter Aleksandra sold the palace to General Isidore Krasiński. Between 1828 and 1834 the palace was owned by the government of the Kingdom of Poland and occupied by offices and a hospital during the November Uprising. In 1834, the estate was bought by financier Abraham Simon Cohen. During this period, the palace was rebuilt to maximise profitability. For this purpose, many shops, market stalls, small apartments and a Jewish prayer house were introduced. The prayer house was active until 1940.

By the end of the 19th and early 20th centuries, the building was in desperate need of renovation. In 1928 Wenceslaus Moszkowski transformed the palace and added one floor, damaging its historic character.

In 1938 Cohen sold the building to the City of Warsaw, which decided to renovate it, but the plans were not implemented because of the outbreak of World War II. The first days of the war saw the destruction of the palace: during the Siege of Warsaw in September 1939, the Germans burned down the building, with only the colonnade staying intact.

After the war the palace was rebuilt; between 1947 and 1950, construction work was carried out under the direction of Tadeusz Zurowski. The palace was rebuilt based on the earlier plans of Joachim Hempel.

In 1970 it was decided to move the palace from the original site. Marshal Marian Spychalski, proposed turning the palace, so that it aligned with the Saxon Axis and the Tomb of the Unknown Soldier. The operation was developed by Aleksander Mostowski and took place from 30 March to 18 May 1970. The palace was cut from its walls and foundations and using special trusses and tracks, slowly shifted to its new orientation. As a result, the building was successfully rotated by 74 degrees.

On 16 November 2010, a monument to Tadeusz Kościuszko was unveiled in front of the palace by the American Citigroup company. The monument is an exact copy of the monument unveiled in Washington, DC on May 9, 1910, by Antoni Popiel.

Previously, in 1985, a monument had been built in front of the palace to the "Fallen in the Service and Defense of the People's Republic of Poland", designed by Jan Bohdan Chmielewski. This was demolished in 1991, having been nicknamed by the inhabitants of Warsaw as the "Monument of the Stabilizers" [of the socialist regime] or the "Ubelisk" (for the Stalinist-era Office of Security, commonly known by its acronym UB).

Today, the palace is home to the Business Centre Club, a media center and the Uczelnia Warszawska im. Marii Skłodowskiej-Curie.

== See also ==
- Hale Mirowskie
- Iron-Gate Square
- Mirów
- Saxon Axis
- Saxon Garden
