= Iron Gate Square =

Square in Warsaw

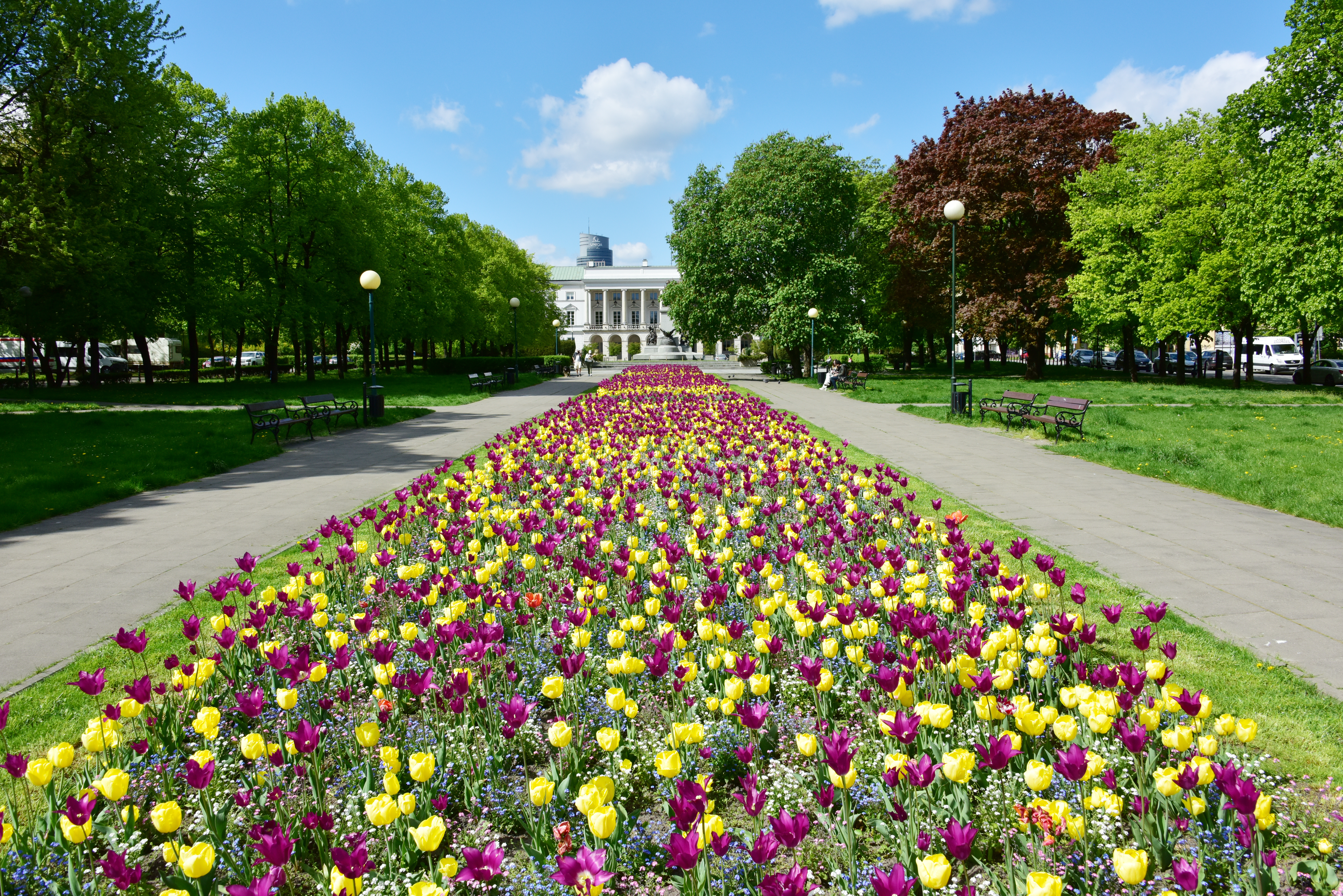
- Native name: Plac Żelaznej Bramy (Polish)
- Type: Town square
- Location: Warsaw, Poland
- Coordinates: 52°14′22″N 21°00′07″E

Historic Monument of Poland
- Designated: 1994-09-08
- Part of: Warsaw – historic city center with the Royal Route and Wilanów
- Reference no.: M.P. 1994 nr 50 poz. 423

Iron Gate Square (Plac Żelaznej Bramy) is a large open space in the city center of Warsaw. The square took its name from a large iron gate that once secured the western boundary of the Saxon Garden.

== History ==
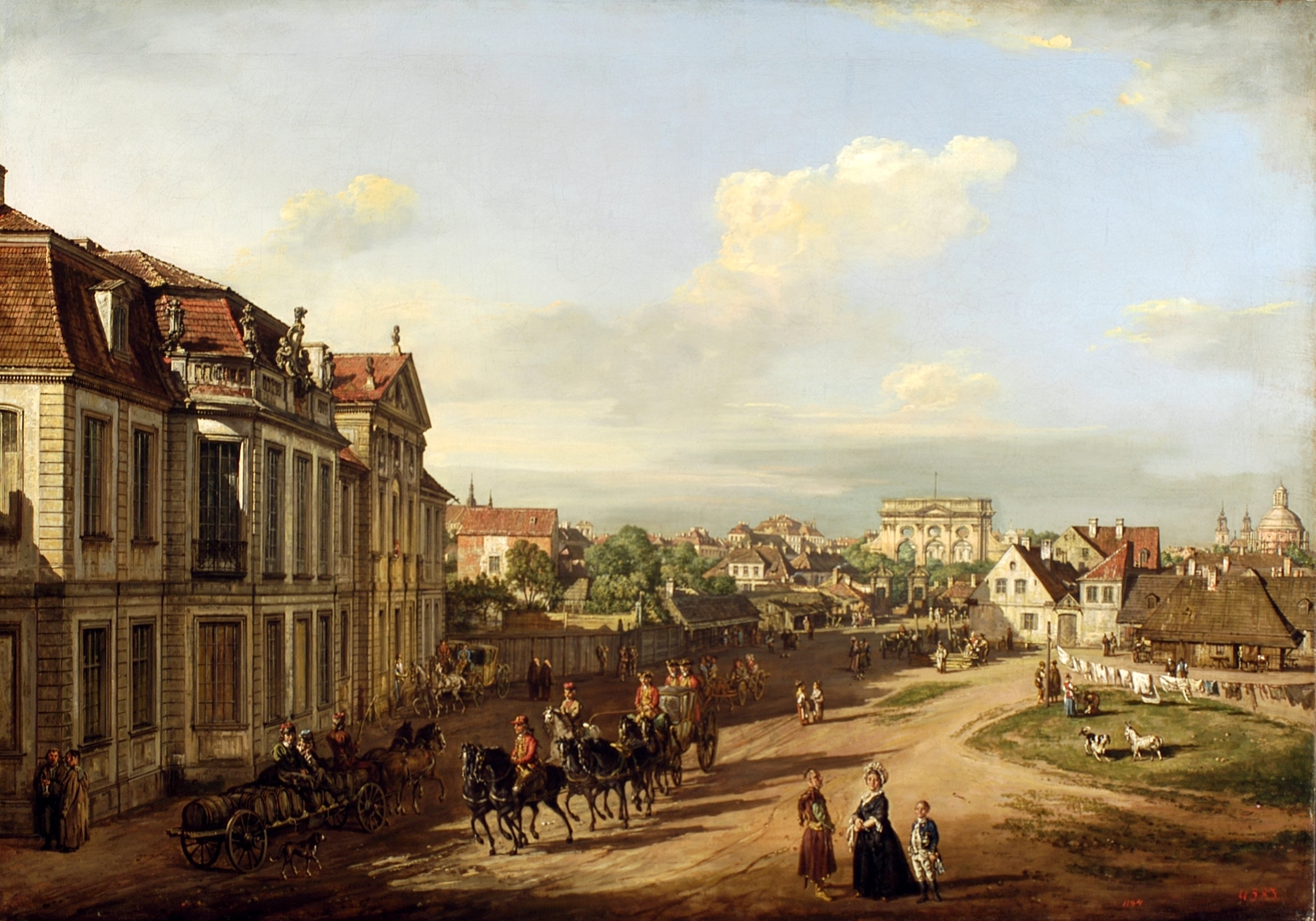
Iron Gate Square, with Lubomirski Palace, 18th century, by "Canaletto"

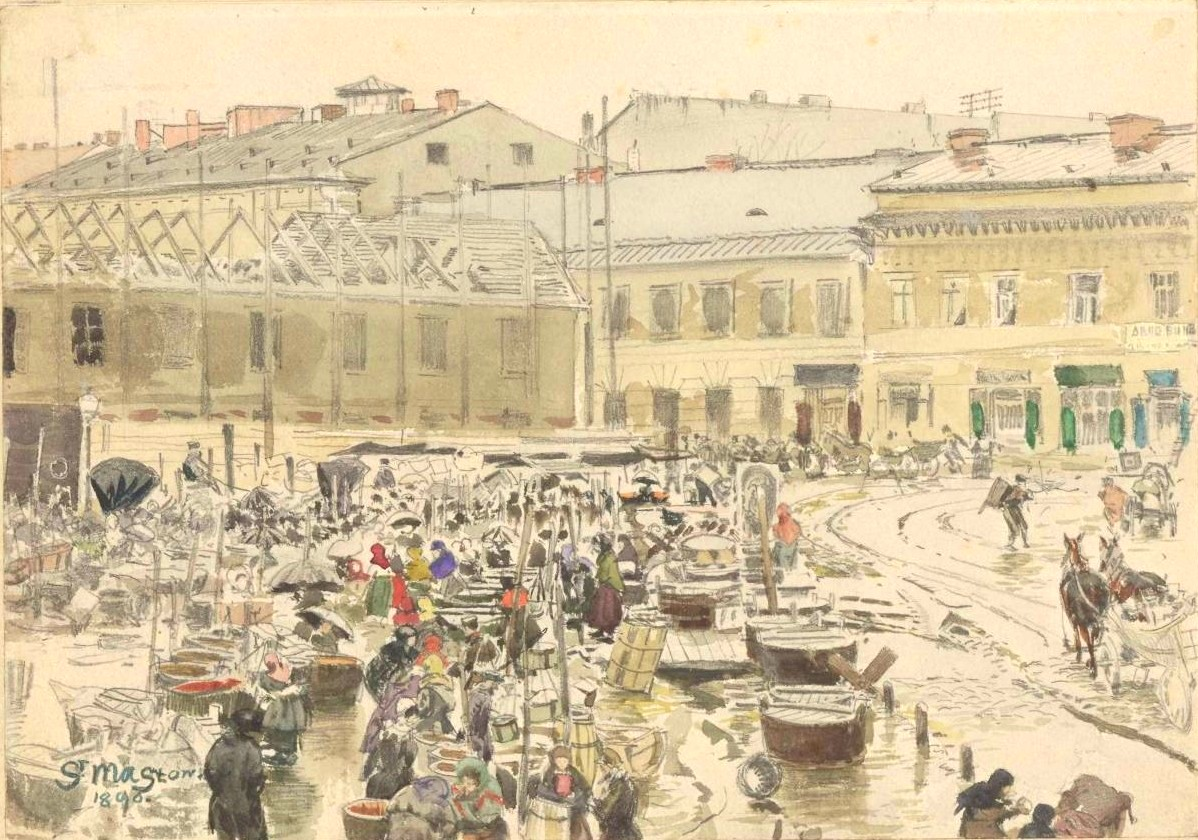
Targ za Żelazną Bramą (Iron Gate Square Marketplace), watercolor by Masłowski, 1884

In the 17th century, the area to the west of Warsaw's Old Town was being parceled out and rapidly built up. It was there that the widow of Jan Wielopolski founded a small town (jurydyka) named Wielopole after her late husband. The town was centered on a small market place dubbed Targowica Wielopolska, "Wielopole Market Place." Though the town was small and poor, it was probably designed by Tylman van Gameren, one of the most renowned architects of the age. The town bordered another small market town, Mirów. In the 18th century, the mighty Radziwiłł family built a palace there. The structure was later bought and expanded by the Lubomirski family, which gave their name to the palace. About the time the palace was built, the town began to prosper.

Under King Augustus II the Strong, the area was completely rebuilt. As August was obsessed with the idea of a "Saxon Axis," he decided to demolish the poor wooden houses in the area and incorporate the market place into the city of Warsaw. The Lubomirski Palace was also to be demolished, as it was constructed some 30 degrees off the axis. However, the plan had to be called off due to financial difficulties and the eventual death of the monarch. Nevertheless, the area continued growing thanks to both the palace and the local market place. It was there that the first permanent coffee house in Warsaw was opened in 1759. It was also there, in the market place, that six large barracks of the Royal Horse Guard were built.

The barracks were demolished by the Russians in the 19th century. In their place a new, smaller square was created. It inherited the name "Plac Mirowski," after the village of Mirów that once stood there. Between 1899 and 1901, two large markets were built there.

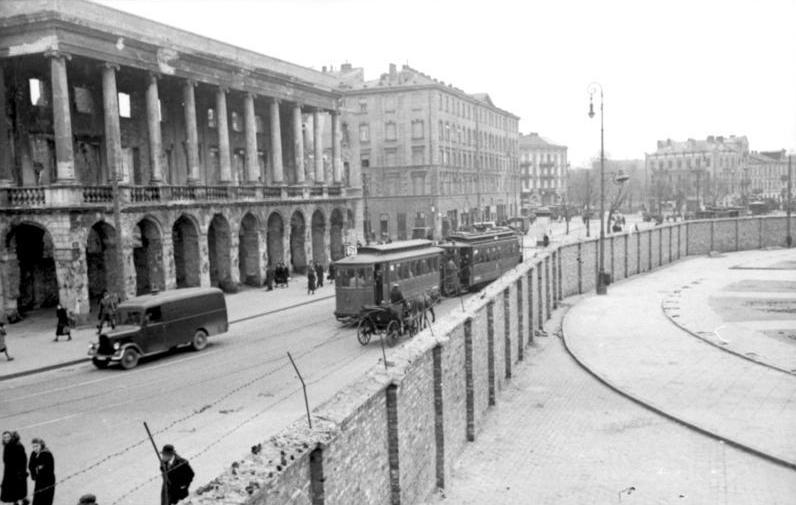
Lubomirski Palace, Iron-Gate Square, Ghetto wall, May 1941

The entire area, excluding the two markets, was completely demolished by the Germans in the aftermath of the 1944 Warsaw Uprising. After the war, the Saxon Garden was delimited on the west, and the place of the former iron gate is now occupied by a street. The Lubomirski Palace was partially rebuilt, but was rotated some 30 degrees to conform to the Saxon Axis. In the 1960s, under Władysław Gomułka, the former square was built up with large apartment blocks. Even though the square no longer exists, the new buildings retain "Iron-Gate Square" addresses.
