= Saxon Axis =

Coordinates: 52°14′26″N 21°00′31″E

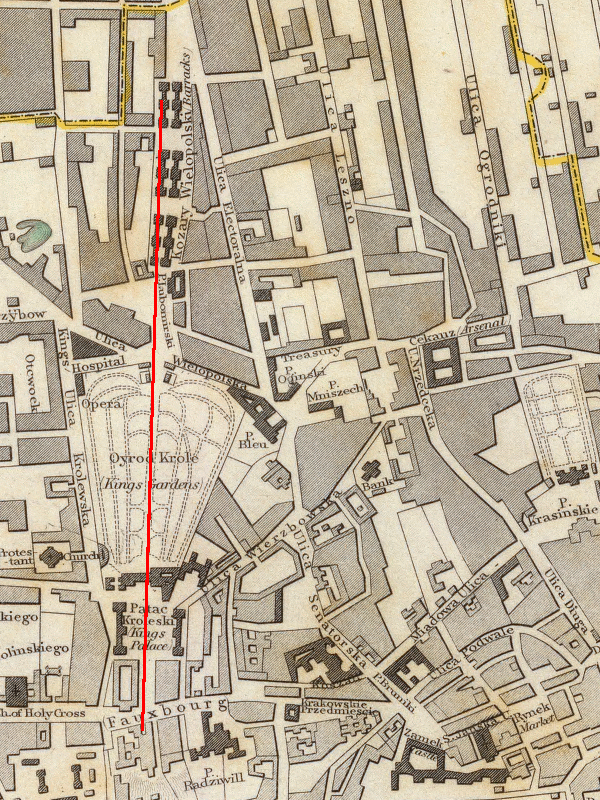
Saxon Axis marked on an 1831 map of Warsaw

The Saxon Axis (Polish: Oś Saska) is a feature of the historical city centre of Warsaw. It is a line running from the Vistula through the Presidential Palace, the Krakowskie Przedmieście, Saxon Square, Saxon Palace, Saxon Garden, Lubomirski Palace to Plac Żelaznej Bramy.

The idea was first proposed by August II of Poland, who intended to build a large Royal palace surrounded by a French-style garden. The plan was loosely based on the baroque design of the Palace of Versailles and was to cover a large part of what is now the city of Warsaw. The main concept, which gave the name to the modern part of the city, assumed the construction of the Saxon Palace, with gardens extending to the both sides along a single axis running exactly through its middle.

Between 1713 and 1726 the king bought 28 parcels of land in the area and invited Matthäus Daniel Pöppelmann and Johann Christoph Naumann to design the urban plan. However, financial difficulties made the plan never come true in its entirety. The Saxon Garden and the Saxon Palace were constructed, but the planned demolition of the Lubomirski Palace at the Plac Żelaznej Bramy was called off after August's death in 1733.

During World War II and the Warsaw Uprising of 1944, all the buildings along the axis were demolished by the Germans. After the war, the Saxon Palace was not rebuilt. However, the garden was refurbished and the demolished Lubomirski Palace was rebuilt, but was rotated to fit into the 18th century scheme. In recent times also the Warsaw University Library at the Vistula below the river escarpment was added to the list of buildings with main entrances along the axis, and a large golden tablet was placed in the pavement in front of it marking the line running through the city centre.
