= Equestrian statue of Tadeusz Kościuszko (Milwaukee) =

Outdoor sculpture by Gaetano Trentanove in Milwaukee, Wisconsin

Coordinates: 43°00′11.5″N 87°55′25.0″W

Tadeusz Kościuszko
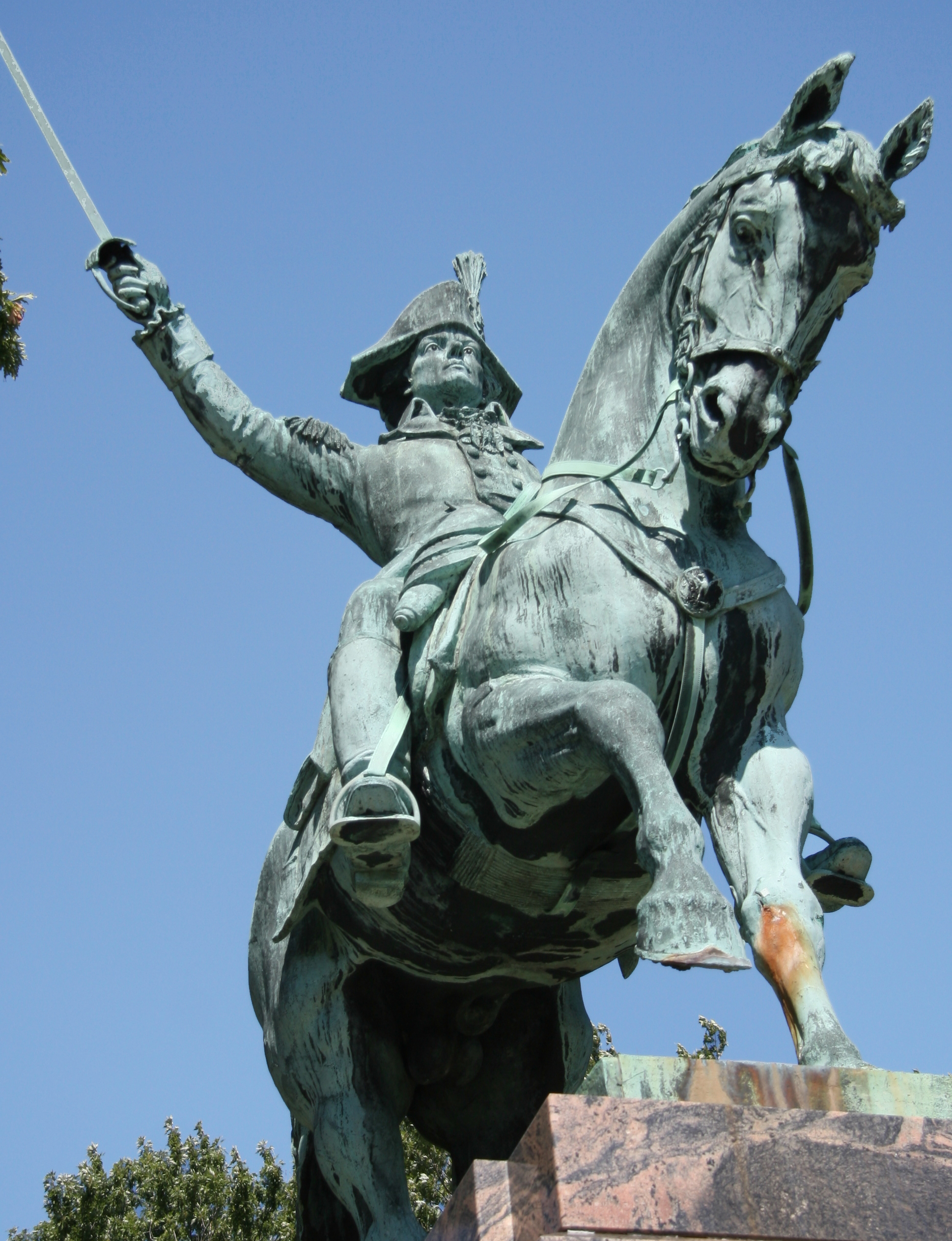
- Artist: Gaetano Trentanove
- Year: 1905
- Type: bronze
- Dimensions: 180 cm (71 in)
- Location: in Kosciuszko Park (restored February–November 2013), Milwaukee, Wisconsin
- Owner: Milwaukee County Parks Department

An equestrian statue of Tadeusz Kościuszko by the Italian and American artist Gaetano Trentanove is located on the south side of Milwaukee, Wisconsin, in the United States. The bronze equestrian sculpture portrays Kościuszko in his military uniform and hat. It is located at South 9th Place and West Lincoln Avenue in Kosciuszko Park. The statue was placed in October 1904 but was not officially unveiled until June 18, 1905 with a speech by Archbishop F. Symon from Rome. The statue was moved to its present location in 1951 and a celebratory unveiling was held on September 15 of that year.

Short video of sculpture.

== Condition ==
A condition assessment of the monument was conducted by McKay Lodge Conservation Laboratory. They found several condition issues some originating from the poor quality of the original cast and others due to climate. The condition problems included casting porosity, patches and plugs, chill cracks, weaknesses in armature, and a general need for cleaning. In 2013 the Restore Kosciuszko Monument Project successfully raised funds to fully restore the monument. The statue was rededicated on November 11, 2013.

== See also ==
- Brigadier General Thaddeus Kosciuszko statue in Washington, D.C.
